= List of state highways in Kentucky (2000–2999) =

The following is a list of state highways in Kentucky with numbers between 2000 and 2999.

== 2000-2099 ==
Number	Southern or western terminus	Northern or eastern terminus	Notes
KY 2000	KY 1524 south of Goose Rock	KY 66 in Creekville	
KY 2001	KY 82 in Estill County	KY 1057 south of Clay City	
KY 2002	KY 3630 in Peoples	KY 89 in Parrot	
KY 2003	KY 2002 in Parrot	KY 290 north of Annville	
KY 2004	US 421 in Sandgap	Alcorn	
KY 2005	KY 987	KY 72 in Pathfork	
KY 2006	Cloverlick Creek	KY 179 in Cumberland	
KY 2007	US 119 in Coldiron	KY 219 in Wallins Creek	
KY 2008	KY 2009 in Chappell	KY 221 in Big Laurel	
KY 2009	KY 221 east of Bledsoe	KY 2008 south of Chappell	
KY 2010	US 119 south of Lejunior	KY 221 southwest of Pine Mountain	
KY 2011	KY 221 in Stoney Fork	KY 66 north of Beverly	
KY 2012	Hen Wilder Branch Road in Tejay	US 119 in Callaway	
KY 2013	KY 221 in Jenson	KY 1630 in Kettle Island	
KY 2014	US 25E in Fourmile	Ivy Grove	
KY 2015	US 25E in Pineville	KY 2014 in Fourmile	
KY 2016	KY 52 in Saint Helens	KY 715 near Torrent	
KY 2017	KY 52 in Monica	KY 708 near Fillmore	
KY 2018	KY 607 in Natlee	KY 1883 near Natlee	
KY 2019	US 460 near Salyersville	KY 1081 near Bloomington	
KY 2020	KY 40 in Salyersville	US 460 in Mashfork	
KY 2021	Yerkes	KY 80 near Typo	
KY 2022	KY 484 near Saul	KY 28 / KY 1387 in Buckhorn	
KY 2023	KY 1274 in Menifee County	Camp Judy in Morgan County	Removed 2018; now Camp Judy Lane
KY 2024	Sebastian	KY 30 in Lerose	
KY 2025	KY 847 in Endee	KY 11 near Southfork	
KY 2026	KY 11 / KY 2481 in Clay City	KY 213 in Stanton	
KY 2027	KY 746 in Valeria	KY 1010 in Maytown	
KY 2028	Mary	KY 15 in Vortex	
KY 2029	KY 80 near Bolyn	KY 7 near Bosco	
KY 2030	KY 122 in Printer	KY 1426 near Amba	
KY 2031	KY 40 in Beauty	KY 292 near Hode	
KY 2032	KY 1714 near Pilgrim	KY 40 near Beauty	
KY 2033	KY 1884 in Milo	KY 1690 near Richardson	
KY 2034	KY 15 Bus. in Whitesburg	Southdown	
KY 2035	KY 931 in Dongola	US 119 near Ermine	
KY 2036	KY 160 in Roxana	KY 7 in Letcher	
KY 2037	Gallup	KY 1690 near Gallup	
KY 2038	US 23 near Chapman	Chapman	
KY 2039	KY 825 near Collista	US 460 near Staffordsville	
KY 2040	KY 40 near Offutt	Offutt	
KY 2041	KY 1956 near Pittsburg	US 25 near Pittsburg	
KY 2042	KY 17 near Atwood	KY 177 in Kenton	
KY 2043	US 25 near Bracht	KY 536 in Ricedale	
KY 2044	KY 16 in Independence	KY 177 in Ryland Heights	
KY 2045	KY 536 in Independence	KY 16 in Independence	
KY 2046	US 25 near Bracht	KY 14 near Morning View	
KY 2047	KY 1486 in Independence	KY 177 in Ryland Heights	
KY 2048	KY 155 in Louisville	US 60 in Louisville	
KY 2049	KY 1934 in Louisville	US 31W / US 60 / US 60 Alt. in Louisville	
KY 2050	KY 146 in Louisville	KY 22 in Louisville	
KY 2051	US 31W / US 60 in Louisville	KY 1934 in Louisville	
KY 2052	KY 1065 in Louisville	US 31E / US 150 in Louisville	
KY 2053	KY 61 in Louisville	US 31E / US 150 in Louisville	
KY 2054	South 40th Street / Algonquin Parkway in Louisville	US 60 Alt. in Louisville	
KY 2055	KY 1020 in Louisville	KY 907 in Louisville	
KY 2056	Ohio River in Louisville	KY 1934 in Louisville	
KY 2057	KY 699 in Smilax	Daley	
KY 2058	KY 1780 in Spruce Pine	US 421 in Helton	
KY 2059	KY 194 near Argo	KY 194 near Majestic	
KY 2060	KY 194	Virginia state line near Paw Paw	Removed 1992; now Rockhouse Fork Road
KY 2061	US 23 in Coal Run Village	KY 194 near Gulnare	
KY 2062	KY 194 near Jamboree	KY 194 in Stopover	
KY 2063	KY 558 near Snow	KY 90 near Upchurch	
KY 2064	Peytonsburg	KY 61 in Peytonsburg	
KY 2065	Finney	KY 252 in Finney	
KY 2066	KY 672 near Lakeshore	Lakeshore	
KY 2067	Boat Ramp Road along Nolin River Lake in Edmonson County	KY 259 at Moutardier	
KY 2068	McGowan	KY 128 near McGowan	
KY 2069	KY 1006 in London	US 25 in London	
KY 2070	KY 784 / KY 1021 near York	KY 7 near Load	
KY 2071	KY 746 near Pomeroyton	KY 946 near Pomeroyton	
KY 2072	Buckhorn Lake State Resort Park	KY 1933	Removed 2012; now Gays Creek
KY 2073	KY 11 in Stanton	KY 2026 in Stanton	
KY 2074	Dead end	US 421 in Chevrolet	Removed 2022; now Chevrolet Hollow
KY 2075	US 641 Bus. / KY 2594 in Murray	US 641 in Murray	
KY 2076	US 421 / KY 80 in Manchester	KY 687 in Manchester	
KY 2077	Timsley	KY 92 in Timsley	
KY 2078	US 60 near Garvin Ridge	US 60 in Olive Hill	
KY 2079	KY 186 in Middlesborough	KY 441 in Middlesborough	
KY 2080	KY 139 in Princeton	KY 91 in Princeton	
KY 2081	KY 1336 in Tilton	KY 11 near Tilton	Formed 2009
KY 2081			Removed 1997
KY 2082	KY 85 near Anton	KY 862 near Anton	
KY 2083	US 41 in Nortonville	US 41 in Little Valley	
KY 2084	US 41 / KY 425 near Rankin	KY 351 in Henderson	
KY 2084	KY 2084 in Henderson	KY 2084 in Henderson	
KY 2085			Removed 2011
KY 2086			Removed 2002
KY 2087	KY 132 in Dixon	US 41 Alt. in Dixon	
KY 2088			Removed 1997
KY 2089	Blackford	KY 143 in Blackford	
KY 2090	KY 141 in Pride	KY 758 in Pride	
KY 2091	KY 56 near Breckinridge Center	US 60 in Morganfield	
KY 2092			Removed 1996
KY 2093			Removed 1987
KY 2094	KY 141 near Waverly	US 60 in Waverly	
KY 2095	Robards	KY 2097 near Robards	Formed 2008
KY 2095			Removed 1992
KY 2096	KY 2097 near Robards	KY 416 near Robards	
KY 2097	US 41 near Robards	Robards	
KY 2098	Henderson	KY 2084 in Henderson	
KY 2099	KY 2084 in Henderson	KY 812 in Henderson	

== 2100-2199 ==
Number	Southern or western terminus	Northern or eastern terminus	Notes
KY 2100			Removed 1990
KY 2101	KY 492 near Grove Center	KY 130 in Grove Center	
KY 2102	KY 550 near Fisty	KY 80 near Fisty	Formed 1991
KY 2102			Removed 1984
KY 2103	US 62 in Central City	KY 304 in Central City	
KY 2104			Removed 2001
KY 2105			Removed 2001
KY 2106	Central City	KY 277 in Central City	
KY 2107	US 431 / KY 70 in Drakesboro	US 431 / KY 70 near Central City	
KY 2108	KY 1250 in Spiro	US 150 in Maretburg	Formed 1991
KY 2108			Removed 1984
KY 2109	KY 85 near Station	KY 81 near Station	
KY 2110	KY 85 in Island	KY 138 near Livermore	
KY 2111			Removed 1991
KY 2112			Removed 2001
KY 2113	KY 33 in Versailles	US 62 in Versailles	Formed 2004
KY 2113			Removed 1990
KY 2114			Removed 2003
KY 2115	US 231 in Pleasant Ridge	KY 764 in Pleasant Ridge	
KY 2116	KY 405 in Yelvington	KY 405 in Yelvington	
KY 2117	US 231 in Owensboro	KY 298 in Owensboro	
KY 2118	Broad Acres	KY 81 near Broad Acres	
KY 2119			Removed 2000
KY 2120	Parish	US 60 near Parish	
KY 2121	KY 2698 in Owensboro	US 431 in Owensboro	Formed 1987
KY 2121			Removed 1982
KY 2122	KY 144 near Ensor	KY 1389 near Woodcrest	
KY 2123	KY 297 near Sheridan	KY 1668 near Sheridan	Formed 1987
KY 2123			Removed 1979
KY 2124	KY 261 near Cabot	KY 1700 in Easton	
KY 2125			Removed 2006
KY 2126			Removed 2004
KY 2127	KY 1207 in Handyville	KY 2121 in Owensboro	Formed 1987
KY 2127			Removed by 1982
KY 2128	TN 238 at the Tennessee state line	US 79 / KY 181 in Guthrie	
KY 2129	KY 74 in Middlesborough	KY 441 in Middlesborough	Formed 2022
KY 2129			Removed by 1982
KY 2130			Removed 1986
KY 2131	KY 740 near Coral Hill	KY 70 near Halfway	Formed 1994
KY 2131			Removed 1986
KY 2132	View	US 60 / KY 297 near Midway	Formed 1987
KY 2132			Removed 1978
KY 2133	Blanche	KY 66 in Arjay	
KY 2134	KY 971 near Tyler	KY 94 in Tyler	Formed 1987
KY 2134			Removed 1978
KY 2135	Adairville	US 431 in Adairville	
KY 2136			Removed 1995
KY 2137			Removed 1992
KY 2138	KY 591 / KY 3053 in Adairville	KY 2135 in Adairville	
KY 2139	Blue Pond	KY 925 in Brownsville	Formed 1987
KY 2139			Removed 1978
KY 2140	KY 125 near Stubbs	KY 94 near Stubbs	Formed 1987
KY 2140			Removed 1978
KY 2141	US 127 near Hustonville	US 127 near Milledgeville	Formed 2001
KY 2141			Removed 1986
KY 2142			Removed 1993
KY 2143	US 31E near Cave City	KY 685 near Cave City	Formed 1994
KY 2143			Removed 1986
KY 2144			Removed 1992
KY 2145	Adairville		
KY 2146	US 79 / US 431 near Russellville	KY 3519 in Russellville	
KY 2147			Removed 1992
KY 2148			Formed 1985; removed 1986
KY 2148			Removed by 1982
KY 2149	KY 1909 near Riceville	US 51 / KY 2567 in Riceville	Formed 1987
KY 2149			Removed by 1982
KY 2150	KY 129 near Fulton	Fulton	Formed 1987
KY 2150			Removed by 1982
KY 2151	KY 339 near Kansas	KY 1820 near Kansas	Formed 1987
KY 2151			Removed by 1982
KY 2152	KY 28 in Cowcreek	Cowcreek	Formed 1987
KY 2152			Removed 1984
KY 2153	Yuba	KY 141 near Boxville	
KY 2154	US 68 in Lebanon	KY 208	Formed 1992
KY 2154			Removed 1984
KY 2155	US 60 / US 231 in Owensboro	KY 2262 in Owensboro	Formed 2002
KY 2155			Removed 1991
KY 2156	KY 140 near Cleopatra	KY 554 near Panther	Formed 1987
KY 2156			Removed 1983
KY 2157	KY 764 near Whitesville	KY 144 near Knottsville	Formed 1987
KY 2157			Removed by 1982
KY 2158	US 231 in Bowling Green	KY 234 near Bowling Green	
KY 2159			Removed 1992
KY 2160	Walnut Grove	KY 100 in Scottsville	Formed 1987
KY 2160			Removed 1983
KY 2161	Main Street / W.G.L. Smith Street in Morgantown	Ward Avenue / Morrison Street in Morgantown	Spur from US 231
KY 2162	KY 70 / KY 403 in Morgantown	KY 2161 in Morgantown	
KY 2163	Clare	KY 100 near Chapel Hill	Formed 1987
KY 2163			Removed 1983
KY 2164	Gamaliel	KY 382 in Gamaliel	
KY 2165	KY 375 / KY 1049 in Tompkinsville	Tompkinsville	
KY 2166	KY 375 in Tompkinsville	KY 375 in Tompkinsville	
KY 2167	KY 122 in Robinson Creek	US 23 in Robinson Creek	Formed 1992
KY 2167			Removed 1984
KY 2168	US 127 near Danville	KY 34 in Danville	Formed 1994
KY 2168			Removed 1984
KY 2169	KY 194 near Meta	KY 1426 in Meta	Formed 1993
KY 2169			Removed 1984
KY 2170	KY 98 near Fountain Run	KY 100 in Fountain Run	
KY 2171	US 41 south of Madisonville	Grapevine	Formed 1995
KY 2171			Removed 1984
KY 2172	KY 63 in Tompkinsville	KY 2166 in Tompkinsville	
KY 2173			Formed 1987; removed 2005
KY 2173			Removed by 1981
KY 2174			Removed 1992
KY 2175	US 60 near Marion	Marion	Formed 2021
KY 2175			Removed 1992
KY 2176			Removed 1992
KY 2177			Removed 1992
KY 2178			Removed 1992
KY 2179	KY 179 in Cumberland	KY 160 in Cumberland	Formed 1997
KY 2179			Removed 1984
KY 2180			Formed 1987; removed 2002
KY 2180			Removed 1982
KY 2181			Formed 1987; removed 2020
KY 2181			Removed by 1982
KY 2182	KY 70 / KY 259 in Brownsville	KY 2184 in Brownsville	
KY 2183	KY 351 in Graham Hill	US 60 near Baskett	Formed 1987
KY 2183			Removed by 1982
KY 2184	Loop from KY 70 / KY 259 in Brownsville		
KY 2185	KY 357 near Perryville	KY 569 near Hinesdale	
KY 2186			Removed 2012
KY 2187	KY 1954 in Farley	KY 284 in Paducah	Formed 1999
KY 2187			Removed 1984
KY 2188			Removed 1984
KY 2189	US 68 / KY 80 near Glasgow	US 31W in Park City	Formed 1987
KY 2189			Removed by 1981
KY 2190			Removed 1984
KY 2191	US 62 in Clarkson	KY 920 near Clarkson	
KY 2192	KY 1241 near Folsomdale	KY 945 near Kansas	Formed 1987
KY 2192			Removed by 1981
KY 2193	US 62 in Millwood	KY 54 near Black Rock	
KY 2194	KY 945 near Pottsville	KY 1241 near West Viola	
KY 2195	KY 70 in Cave City	US 31E at Bear Wallow	Formed 1987
KY 2195			Removed 1983
KY 2196			Removed 1995
KY 2197			Removed 1988
KY 2198	KY 90 near Bristletown	KY 1307 near Slick Rock	Formed 1987
KY 2198			Removed 1983
KY 2199	Four Corners	KY 333 in Big Spring	

== 2200-2299 ==
Number	Southern or western terminus	Northern or eastern terminus	Notes
KY 2200			Removed 1994
KY 2201	KY 105 / KY 79 near Glen Dean	KY 105 near Axtel	
KY 2202	KY 333 near Basin Spring	US 60 / KY 79 in Irvington	
KY 2203			Removed 1988
KY 2204	KY 448 in Brandenburg	Brandenburg	Removed 2025
KY 2205	KY 80 near South Highland	KY 464 near Mayfield	
KY 2206	KY 703 near Clinton	KY 288 in Spring Hill	
KY 2207	KY 252 near Haywood	US 31E in Glasgow	Formed 1987
KY 2207			Removed 1983
KY 2208	KY 58 near Bugg	KY 1708 near Bugg	
KY 2209	US 51 near Clinton	KY 1529 near Beelerton	
KY 2210			Removed 1996
KY 2211			Removed 1999
KY 2212	KY 1375 near Perryville	KY 220 in Rineyville	
KY 2213	KY 86 near Vertrees	KY 2199 near Four Corners	
KY 2214			Removed 1998
KY 2215			Removed by 1977
KY 2216	KY 1517 near Maxine	KY 357 near Maxine	
KY 2217	KY 210 in Hodgenville	KY 1832 near Leafdale	
KY 2218			Removed 1999
KY 2219			Removed 1986
KY 2220	KY 9 west of Foster	KY 8 west of Foster	Formed 2025
KY 2220			Removed 1999
KY 2221			Removed 1986
KY 2222	KY 658 near South Campbellsville	KY 1799 near Arista	
KY 2223			Removed 1986
KY 2224	Burr	US 25 near Mount Vernon	
KY 2225	KY 453 near Lake City	KY 93 in Iuka	Formed 1987
KY 2225			Removed by 1981
KY 2226	KY 81 near Semiway	KY 85 near Buttonsberry	Formed 1984
KY 2226			Removed 1978
KY 2227	US 27 in Somerset	KY 1247 in Somerset	
KY 2228	KY 9 in Foster	KY 8 in Foster	Removed 2025
KY 2229			Removed 1999
KY 2230	Woodlawn	US 62 near Woodlawn	
KY 2231			Removed 1987
KY 2232	KY 866 near Iuka	KY 70 near Mitchell Landing	Formed 1987
KY 2232			Removed by 1983
KY 2233			Removed 1993
KY 2234	Cardwell	KY 1586 in Cardwell	
KY 2235			Removed 2011
KY 2236			Removed 1988
KY 2237	KY 480 in Shepherdsville	KY 480C in Shepherdsville	
KY 2238	US 27 in Highland Heights	KY 2345 in Wilder	Formed 1984
KY 2238			Removed 1978
KY 2239	KY 55 near Wakefield	KY 44 in Taylorsville	
KY 2240	KY 1297 at Railton	US 68 / KY 80 at Merry Oaks	Formed 1987
KY 2240			Removed 1983
KY 2241	KY 1932 in Louisville	US 60 in Louisville	
KY 2242			Removed 1984
KY 2243	US 60 in Spottsville	US 60 / KY 1078 in Spottsville	Formed 1987
KY 2243			Removed 1983
KY 2244			Removed 1997
KY 2245	KY 2262 in Owensboro	KY 2831 in Owensboro	
KY 2246			Removed 1984
KY 2247	KY 812 near Anthoston	KY 1078 near Zion	Formed 1987
KY 2247			Removed 1983
KY 2248	KY 1299 near Anthoston	US 41 in Anthoston	Formed 1987
KY 2248			Removed 1983
KY 2249	KY 1078 near Coraville	KY 351 near Zion	Formed 1987
KY 2249			Removed 1983
KY 2250	US 150 near Brodhead	US 150 / KY 3245 near Brodhead	Formed 2011
KY 2250			Removed 2007
KY 2251	US 31E / US 150 in Louisville	US 31E / US 150 in Louisville	
KY 2252			Removed 1997
KY 2253	KY 145 in Dixie	US 41 Alt. in Cairo	Formed 1987
KY 2253			Removed 1982
KY 2254			Removed 1984
KY 2255			Removed 1984
KY 2256	KY 1472 at Graefenburg	US 60 at Graefenburg	
KY 2257	KY 90 west of Cherokee Trail	KY 90 west of Chenoweth Road	Formed 2023
KY 2257			Removed 1984
KY 2258	KY 53 east of Shelbyville	Shelbyville	
KY 2259	Shelby Street / Tanglewood Drive in Frankfort	US 60 in Frankfort	
KY 2260	KY 136 in Geneva	KY 266	Formed 1987; removed 2018
KY 2260			Removed by 1982
KY 2261	KY 420 in Frankfort	US 127 in Frankfort	
KY 2262	KY 54 in Owensboro	IN 161 at the Owensboro Bridge over the Ohio River	Formed 2011
KY 2262			Removed 1989
KY 2263	KY 70 in Rochester	KY 393 in Rochester	Formed 1987; removed 2018
KY 2263			Removed by 1982
KY 2264			Formed 1982; removed 1992
KY 2264			Removed ca. 1979
KY 2265	Old Taylorsville Road in Louisville	KY 155 in Louisvillle	
KY 2266	Milshed Road north of the Green River	KY 70 at Jetson	Formed 1987
KY 2266			Removed by 1982
KY 2267	KY 1153 at Leetown	KY 70 at Dunbar	Formed 1987
KY 2267			Removed by 1982
KY 2268	Clear Creek near Shelbyville	KY 43 / KY 55 Bus. near Shelbyville	Formed 1992
KY 2268			Removed by 1982
KY 2269	KY 1118 at Gilstrap	KY 2713 at Dexterville	Formed 1987
KY 2269			Removed by 1982
KY 2270	KY 973 near Rosewood	KY 70 at Ennis	Formed 1987
KY 2270			Formed 1982; removed 1984
KY 2270			Removed ca. 1979
KY 2271	US 60 in Frankfort	KY 2259 in Frankfort	
KY 2272	US 62 near Daniel Boone	KY 3059 near Daniel Boone	Formed 1987
KY 2272			Removed by 1982
KY 2273	KY 109 near Charleston	KY 70 near Beulah	Formed 1987
KY 2273			Removed 1982
KY 2274	Pee Vee	KY 70 in Madisonville	Formed 1987
KY 2274			Removed 1982
KY 2275	Barnetts Creek	KY 40 near Staffordsville	Formed 1983
KY 2275			Removed 1978
KY 2276	KY 90 near Burkesville	KY 61 in Burkesville	
KY 2277	KY 829 in Cumberland City	Narvel	
KY 2278	Whitley City	KY 1651 in Whitley City	
KY 2279			Removed 1990
KY 2280	KY 1034 near Coiltown	US 41 Alt. near Nebo	Formed 1987
KY 2280			Removed 1982
KY 2281	KY 281 near Madisonville	KY 254 near Madisonville	Formed 2011
KY 2281			Removed 1990
KY 2282	US 27 in Greenwood	Greenwood	
KY 2283	KY 1729 near Sano	KY 1545 near Royville	
KY 2284	KY 55 near Freedom	US 127 near Sewellton	
KY 2285			Removed 2001
KY 2286			Removed 2001
KY 2287	KY 55 Bus. in Columbia	KY 61 near Columbia	
KY 2288	KY 767 / KY 2972 near Cane Valley	Cane Valley	
KY 2289	KY 76 in Eunice	KY 76, 1 mi from Neatsville	
KY 2290	KY 55 Bus. in Columbia	KY 206 in Columbia	
KY 2291	KY 2292 in Somerset	Somerset	
KY 2292	US 27 in Somerset	KY 1247 in Somerset	
KY 2293	KY 2295 in Burnside	Burnside	
KY 2294	KY 2295 in Burnside	KY 2295 in Burnside	
KY 2295	US 27 in Burnside	US 27 in Burnside	
KY 2296	KY 80 Bus. in Somerset	KY 39 in Somerset	
KY 2297	US 27 in Somerset	KY 2292 in Somerset	
KY 2298	KY 2292 in Somerset	US 27 in Somerset	
KY 2299	KY 2292 in Somerset	US 27 in Somerset	

== 2300-2399 ==
Number	Western or southern terminus	Eastern or northern terminus	Notes
KY 2300	KY 80 Bus. in Somerset	KY 80 in Somerset	
KY 2301	Burnside	US 27 in Burnside	
KY 2302			Removed 2007
KY 2303	KY 1247 in Somerset	KY 80 in Somerset	
KY 2304	KY 790 in Bronston	Burnside	
KY 2305			Removed 1984
KY 2306			Removed 1984
KY 2307			Removed 1984
KY 2308	KY 1247 at Science Hill	KY 635 at Science Hill	
KY 2309	KY 1247 at Science Hill	KY 635 at Science Hill	
KY 2310	Dunnville	US 127 in Dunnville	
KY 2311	Liberty		
KY 2312	Loop from KY 70 Bus. in Liberty		
KY 2313	US 127 in Liberty	KY 70 Bus. in Liberty	
KY 2314	KY 49 in Liberty	US 127 in Liberty	
KY 2315			Removed 1994
KY 2316			Removed 1994
KY 2317	Hollyvilla	KY 1851 near South Park View	
KY 2318	KY 580 near Manila	Manila	Formed 1983
KY 2318			Removed by 1977
KY 2319	Stanford	KY 78 in Stanford	Removed 2024
KY 2320	KY 1034 near Coiltown	US 41 Alt. near Nebo	Formed 1987
KY 2320			Removed by 1977
KY 2321			Removed 2010
KY 2322			Removed 2011
KY 2323	US 25 in Mount Vernon	KY 1326 in Mount Vernon	
KY 2324	KY 33 in Danville	KY 34 in Danville	
KY 2325	KY 259 near Pig	KY 70 near Arthur	Formed 1987
KY 2325			Removed by 1977
KY 2326	US 31W near Tuckertown	KY 743 near Chalybeate	Formed 1987
KY 2326			Removed 1978
KY 2327	KY 876 in Richmond	Richmond	
KY 2328	US 25 / US 421 near Lexington	I-75 / US 25 / US 421 in Lexington	
KY 2329	Harrodsburg	US 127 in Harrodsburg	
KY 2330	KY 187 near Sunfish	KY 1075 near Sunfish	Formed 1987
KY 2330			Removed by 1977
KY 2331	KY 1659 near McKees Crossroads	KY 1685 near McKees Crossroads	
KY 2332	KY 29 in Nicholasville	KY 169 in Nicholasville	
KY 2333	KY 321 Bus. in Paintsville	KY 1428 in Paintsville	Formed 1996
KY 2333			Removed 1989
KY 2334			Removed 1989
KY 2335	KY 57 near Avon	KY 1939 near Sidville	
KY 2336	KY 728 near Oak Ridge	KY 259 in Broadway	Formed 1987
KY 2336			Removed 1978
KY 2337	US 41 Alt. in Madisonville	KY 1069 near West Hanson	Formed 1987
KY 2337			Removed 1983
KY 2338	KY 281 near Hanson	KY 254 near Hanson	Formed 1987
KY 2338			Removed 1981
KY 2339	KY 892 near Anton	KY 85 near Anton	Formed 1987
KY 2339			Removed by 1977
KY 2340			Formed 1987; removed 2011
KY 2340			Removed 1981
KY 2341	I-69/US 41	Indiana	Planned designation for US 41 in Henderson
KY 2341			Removed 1995
KY 2342	US 60 near Brady	KY 519 in Clearfield	Formed 1985
KY 2342			Removed 1981
KY 2343			Removed 1994
KY 2344	KY 1923 in Winchester	US 60 in Winchester	
KY 2345	US 27 in Highland Heights	KY 9 in Wilder	Formed 1999
KY 2345			Removed 1994
KY 2346	US 60 in Reid Village	Reid Village	
KY 2347	KY 138 near Ashbyburg	KY 370 near Ashbyburg	Formed 1987
KY 2347			Removed by 1980
KY 2348	Mount Sterling	KY 11 in Mount Sterling	
KY 2349	South Union	US 68 near South Union	Formed 1987
KY 2349			Removed by 1977
KY 2350	KY 36 near Indian Hills	US 42 in Carrollton	
KY 2351			Removed 2005
KY 2352	KY 1316 near Poplar Grove	Poplar Grove	
KY 2353			Removed 2010
KY 2354	KY 22 in Owenton	US 127 / KY 227 in Owenton	
KY 2355			Removed 2014
KY 2356			Removed 1999
KY 2357			Removed 2014
KY 2358			Removed 2014
KY 2359			Removed 1998
KY 2360			Removed 1994
KY 2361			Removed 1998
KY 2362	KY 489 in Williamstown	Knoxville	
KY 2363	KY 491 in Crittenden	Bracht	
KY 2364			Removed 1993
KY 2365			Removed 1986
KY 2366			Removed 2011
KY 2367			Removed 1993
KY 2368			Removed 2010
KY 2369	KY 100 in Corinth	US 68 in Dennis	Formed 1987
KY 2369			Removed by 1980
KY 2370	KY 875 near Chatham	KY 435 in Augusta	
KY 2371	KY 96 near Oakville	US 431 near Oakville	
KY 2372	Fort Wright	KY 1072 in Park Hills	
KY 2373	US 25 in Erlanger	KY 8 in Bromley	
KY 2374	KY 8 in Covington	KY 8 in Covington	Removed 2018
KY 2375	KY 102 near Mosley Pond	KY 1041 near Dot	Formed 1987
KY 2375			Removed by 1977
KY 2376	KY 178 near Justice	KY 106 in Spa	Formed 1987
KY 2376			Removed by 1981
KY 2377	KY 106 near Sand Spring	KY 79 near Pauline	Formed 1987
KY 2377			Removed by 1981
KY 2378	KY 321 in Paintsville	2nd Street in Paintsville	Formed by 1982
KY 2378			Removed 1978
KY 2379	Goldbug	US 25W in Goldbug	
KY 2380	KY 85	McLean/Muhlenberg County Line	Formed 1987; removed 2017
KY 2380			Removed 1981
KY 2381	KY 321 near East Point	KY 302 near Van Lear	Formed 1984
KY 2381			Removed 1978
KY 2382	US 25W near Goldbug	Wofford	
KY 2383	KY 85 near Sacramento	KY 81 near Sacramento	Formed 1987
KY 2383			Removed 1981
KY 2384	KY 1259 in Corbin	KY 312 in Corbin	
KY 2385	KY 1155 near Poplar Grove	KY 81 in Semiway	Formed 1987
KY 2385			Removed 1981
KY 2386	KY 92 in Williamsburg	KY 296 in Williamsburg	
KY 2387	KY 90 near Beaumont	KY 640 in Randolph	Formed 1987
KY 2387			Removed 1978
KY 2388	KY 1189 near Fariston	Fariston	
KY 2389	London	KY 2069 in London	
KY 2390	KY 496 near Curtis	London	
KY 2391	US 25 in London	KY 363 in London	
KY 2392	US 25 in Camp Grounds	US 25 near Hopewell	
KY 2393	KY 1275 near Rankin	Rankin	Formed 1983
KY 2393			Removed by 1977
KY 2394	KY 66 in Pineville	Dorton Branch	
KY 2395			Removed 2022
KY 2396	KY 74 in Middlesborough	KY 441 in Middlesborough	
KY 2397			Removed 1990
KY 2398	KY 92 near Ingram	Ingram	
KY 2399	US 68 near Gascon	KY 80 in Gascon	Formed 1987
KY 2399			Removed 1978

== 2400-2499 ==
Number	Southern or western terminus	Northern or eastern terminus	Notes
KY 2400			Removed 1989
KY 2401	KY 2079 in Middlesborough	KY 1599 in Middlesborough	
KY 2402	KY 74 in Middlesborough	KY 441 in Middlesborough	
KY 2403			Removed 1989
KY 2404			Removed 1995
KY 2405			Formed 2018
KY 2405			Removed 1990
KY 2406	KY 223 in Hammond	Hammond	
KY 2407			Removed 1989
KY 2408	KY 1232 in Gray	KY 233 in Gray	
KY 2409	Dewitt	KY 223 near Dewitt	
KY 2410			Removed by 1981
KY 2411	KY 358 in Maxon	KY 1420 in High Point	Formed 1982
KY 2411			Removed 1978
KY 2412			Removed 1985
KY 2413	KY 2419 in Barbourville	KY 2420 in Barbourville	
KY 2414	KY 1304 near Crane Nest	Crane Nest	
KY 2415	US 25E near Boone Heights	KY 3439 near Boone Heights	
KY 2416			Removed by 1981
KY 2417	US 25E in Corbin	KY 3041 in Corbin	
KY 2418	KY 11 in Heidrick	US 25E near Heidrick	
KY 2419	KY 2420 / KY 2421 in Barbourville	KY 1487 in Barbourville	
KY 2420	KY 2419 / KY 2421 in Barbourville	US 25E in Barbourville	
KY 2421	KY 225 in Boone Heights	KY 6 in Barbourville	
KY 2422	Water Valley	KY 83 / KY 303 in Cuba	
KY 2423	KY 459 in Providence	Barbourville	
KY 2424	KY 413 in Loyall	Loyall	Removed 2022
KY 2425	Teetersville	KY 72 near Teetersville	
KY 2426	KY 61 near Hodgenville	Hodgenville	Formed 1985
KY 2426			Removed by 1981
KY 2427	Teetersville	KY 72 near Teetersville	
KY 2428	Farmers Mill	US 421 near Farmers Mill	
KY 2429	Kenvir	KY 215 in Kenvir	
KY 2430	KY 38 in Evarts	Bailey Creek	
KY 2431	US 421 near Hyden	Hyden	
KY 2432	Manchester	KY 3472 in Manchester	
KY 2433	KY 2 near Greenup	KY 1 near Wurtland	Formed 1987
KY 2433			Removed by 1977
KY 2434			Formed 1987; removed 1991
KY 2434			Removed by 1977
KY 2435	KY 314 near Savoyard	KY 70 / KY 640 near Knob Lick	Formed 1987
KY 2435			Removed by 1977
KY 2436	KY 30 near Noctor	Noctor	Formed 1987
KY 2436			Removed by 1977
KY 2437	KY 798	KY 250 near Tichenor	Formed 1987; removed 2017
KY 2437			Removed by 1977
KY 2438	US 421 in Manchester	Manchester	
KY 2439	Coe	KY 100 in Meshack	Formed 1987
KY 2439			Removed by 1977
KY 2440	US 421 in Manchester	US 421 in Manchester	
KY 2441	KY 100 near Grandview	KY 1049 near Grandview	Formed 1987
KY 2441			Removed by 1977
KY 2442	Manchester	US 421 in Manchester	Removed 2026
KY 2443	KY 1524 near Goose Rock	US 421 in Goose Rock	
KY 2444	KY 2292 in Somerset	Somerset	
KY 2445			Removed 2012
KY 2446	KY 267 in Dice	KY 15 in Ned	
KY 2447	KY 7 in Fusonia	Fusonia	
KY 2448	KY 451 in Hazard	Hazard	
KY 2449			Removed 2012
KY 2450	KY 1066 near Wakefield	Wakefield	
KY 2451			Removed 2012
KY 2452	KY 63 near Forkton	KY 678 near Sulphur Lick	Formed 1987
KY 2452			Removed by 1982
KY 2453	Old Landing	KY 52 near Old Landing	
KY 2454	KY 89 in Irvine	KY 2459 in Irvine	
KY 2455	KY 89 in Irvine	Irvine	
KY 2456			Removed 2001
KY 2457			Removed 2001
KY 2458			Removed 2001
KY 2459	Irvine	KY 89 in Irvine	
KY 2460	KY 52 in Irvine	Irvine	
KY 2461	KY 89 in Irvine	KY 52 in Ravenna	
KY 2462			Removed 2022
KY 2463			Removed 1996
KY 2464			Removed 1996
KY 2465			Removed 1987
KY 2466	Stevenson	KY 30 in Stevenson	
KY 2467	Ashers Fork	KY 1524 near Brightshade	Formed by 1982
KY 2467			Removed by 1982
KY 2468	KY 678 near Flippin	KY 870 in Gum Tree	Formed 1987
KY 2468			Removed by 1982
KY 2469	KY 52 near Oakdale	KY 30 in Shoulderblade	
KY 2470			Removed 1987
KY 2471			Removed 2022
KY 2472	KY 1812 in Jackson	Jackson	
KY 2473			Removed 2001
KY 2474			Removed 1996
KY 2475			Removed 1996
KY 2476	KY 2487 in Stanton	KY 213 in Stanton	
KY 2477	KY 305	KY 358	Formed 2026
KY 2477			Removed 1996
KY 2478			Removed 1996
KY 2479	KY 11 in Clay City	Clay City	
KY 2480	KY 11 near Clay City	KY 1057 in Clay City	
KY 2481	Clay City	KY 11 / KY 2026 in Clay City	
KY 2482			Removed 1996
KY 2483	KY 213 in Stanton	KY 11 in Stanton	
KY 2484			Removed 1996
KY 2485			Removed 1984
KY 2486	KY 11 in Stanton	KY 2476 in Stanton	
KY 2487	KY 213 in Stanton	KY 2026 in Stanton	
KY 2488			Removed 2020
KY 2489	KY 1010 near Toliver	Toliver	
KY 2490			Removed 2020
KY 2491	KY 191 in Campton	KY 1812 near Baptist	
KY 2492			Removed 2020
KY 2493			Removed 2016
KY 2494	KY 2495 in West Liberty	US 460 in West Liberty	
KY 2495	US 460 in West Liberty	US 460 in West Liberty	
KY 2496	US 460 in Ezel	Ezel	
KY 2497	US 460 in Ezel	US 460 in Ezel	
KY 2498	US 460 / KY 191 in West Liberty	US 460 in West Liberty	
KY 2499	West Liberty	US 460 in West Liberty	

== 2500-2599 ==
Number	Southern or western terminus	Northern or eastern terminus	Notes
KY 2500			Removed 2012
KY 2501	US 25 Bus. in Dry Ridge	US 25 in Dry Ridge	Formed 2006
KY 2501			Removed 1995
KY 2502	KY 32 / KY 36 in Carlisle	North Street / State Garage Lane in Carlisle	
KY 2503	KY 11 Bus. in Flemingsburg	KY 32 Bus. in Flemingsburg	
KY 2504	KY 11 Bus. in Flemingsburg	Flemingsburg	
KY 2505	US 68 near Fairview	KY 616 / KY 1029 near Alhambra	
KY 2506	KY 32 Bus. in Flemingsburg	Flemingsburg	
KY 2507	KY 32 Bus. in Flemingsburg	Flemingsburg	
KY 2508	KY 559 in Flemingsburg	KY 11 Bus. in Flemingsburg	
KY 2509	Bugtussle	KY 678 near Flippin	Formed 1987
KY 2509			Removed 1982
KY 2510	KY 697 near Bald Hill	KY 1515 near Bald Hill	
KY 2511			Removed 2005
KY 2512			Removed 1987
KY 2513	US 62 in Maysville	KY 10 in Maysville	
KY 2514	US 68 near Mays Lick	US 68 near Murphysville	
KY 2515	US 68 Bus. in Maysville	Maysville	
KY 2516	US 62 in Maysville	Maysville	
KY 2517	US 68 near Mays Lick	US 68 near Mays Lick	
KY 2518			Removed 2014
KY 2519	KY 11 in Maysville	KY 10 in Maysville	
KY 2520	Farmers	KY 2522 in Farmers	
KY 2521			Removed 2010
KY 2522	US 60 near Farmers	US 60 in Farmers	
KY 2523	KY 9 in Vanceburg	KY 3037 in Vanceburg	
KY 2524			Removed 1995
KY 2525			Removed 2013
KY 2526	Loop from KY 7 / KY 32 in Sandy Hook		
KY 2527	KY 1555 in Gimlet	KY 986 near Access	
KY 2528			Removed 2018
KY 2529	US 60 in Olive Hill	Olive Hill	Removed 2026
KY 2530			Removed 1995
KY 2531	US 60 in Clark Hill	KY 2078 in Olive Hill	
KY 2532	US 60 in Kevil	US 60 in Kevil	Formed 1987
KY 2532			Removed 1982
KY 2533	KY 189 in Greenville	KY 181 in Nebo	Formed 1987
KY 2533			Removed 1982
KY 2534	US 60 in Ashland	Ashland	
KY 2535	US 23 in Catlettsburg	KY 2537 in Catlettsburg	
KY 2536	KY 2537 in Catlettsburg	KY 3294 in Catlettsburg	
KY 2537	Catlettsburg		
KY 2538	US 23 / KY 1043 in Frost	Frost	
KY 2539			Removed 2001
KY 2540	South Shore	KY 7 in South Shore	Old US 23
KY 2541	US 23 / KY 1 in Greenup	US 23 near Greenup	
KY 2542	US 23 near Frost	Frost	
KY 2543	US 23 in Russell	KY 244 in Russell	
KY 2544	US 41 in Hopkinsville	KY 2544 in Hopkinsville	
KY 2545	Sergent	KY 113 in Millstone	
KY 2546	KY 90 in Nora	KY 1009, Narvel	
KY 2547	US 641	US 641	Established 2024 on old US 641
KY 2547			Removed 1989
KY 2548			Removed 1998
KY 2549	KY 461 near Wabd	US 150 near Mount Vernon	
KY 2550	KY 3086 in Jenkins	KY 805 in Jenkins	
KY 2551	KY 175 at Briar Creek	KY 181 near Bremen	Formed 1987
KY 2551			Removed 1983
KY 2552	KY 122 in Shelbiana	Shelbiana	
KY 2553	KY 61 in Pioneer Village	KY 1116 in Zoneton	
KY 2554	KY 80 in Eastern	Langley	
KY 2555	KY 114 near West Prestonsburg	KY 114 in Prestonsburg	
KY 2556			Removed 2002
KY 2557	Betsy Layne	US 23 at Betsy Layne	
KY 2558	KY 3127 in West Van Lear	West Van Lear	
KY 2559	East Point	KY 321 near East Point	
KY 2560	KY 40 in Paintsville	KY 40 in Paintsville	
KY 2561	KY 321 Bus. in Paintsville	KY 40 in Paintsville	
KY 2562	KY 32 near Blaine	Blaine	
KY 2563	KY 2565 near Holt	Louisa	
KY 2564			Removed 1990
KY 2565	US 23 near Walbridge	KY 3 in Louisa	
KY 2566	KY 3 in Louisa	KY 3 in Louisa	
KY 2567	Fulton	Riceville	
KY 2568	KY 116 near Riceville	KY 1648 in Fulton	
KY 2569	Enon	US 45 near Enon	
KY 2570	Enon	KY 2569 near Enon	
KY 2571	East Beelerton	KY 1283 near East Beelerton	
KY 2572			Removed 2002
KY 2573			Removed 2002
KY 2574			Removed 2002
KY 2575			Removed 2002
KY 2576			Removed 1980
KY 2577			Removed 2002
KY 2578			Removed 2002
KY 2579			Removed 2002
KY 2580			Removed 2002
KY 2581			Removed 2002
KY 2582			Removed 2002
KY 2583			Removed 2002
KY 2584	KY 181 near Midland	KY 81 near South Carrollton	Formed 1987
KY 2584			Removed by 1977
KY 2585			Removed 2002
KY 2586			Removed 2002
KY 2587			Removed 2002
KY 2588	KY 339 in Lowes	KY 440 in Lowes	
KY 2589			Removed 2002
KY 2590	KY 1379 in Nelson	KY 1379 near Nelson	Formed 1987
KY 2590			Removed by 1981
KY 2591	Flat Rock Road	KY 73 in Simpson County	Formed 1987; removed 2016
KY 2591			Removed 1982
KY 2592	KY 73 near Franklin	US 31W in Franklin	Formed 1987
KY 2592			Removed by 1981
KY 2593	Lake Springs Rd in Portland, TN	KY 1008 in Franklin	Formed 1987
KY 2593			Removed by 1981
KY 2594	KY 94 in Murray	US 641 Bus. / KY 2075 in Murray	
KY 2595	KY 95 near Palma	US 641 in Calvert City	
KY 2596	Oak Level	Harvey	
KY 2597	Oak Level		
KY 2598	Harvey	KY 2606 near Benton	
KY 2599	KY 2606 near Benton	Benton	

== 2600-2699 ==
Number	Southern or western terminus	Northern or eastern terminus	Notes
KY 2600			Removed 2002
KY 2601	KY 100 near Highland	KY 622 near Gold City	Formed 1987
KY 2601			Removed 1983
KY 2602	I-69 near Calvert City	US 62 in Calvert City	
KY 2603	KY 58 near Brewers	KY 408 near Oak Level	
KY 2604	Harvey		
KY 2605	Scale		
KY 2606	KY 402 near Brewers	KY 348 near Iola	
KY 2607	KY 1422 near Palma	Palma	
KY 2608	Palma	KY 2595 near Palma	
KY 2609	US 641 in Benton	Benton	
KY 2610	US 60 near Smithland	Smithland	
KY 2611	Saratoga	Dulaney	
KY 2612	Midway	KY 2619 near Midway	
KY 2613	Midway		
KY 2614	KY 1955 near Johnetta	KY 1912 near Climax	
KY 2615			Removed 1991
KY 2616			Removed 1991
KY 2617	US 62 in Princeton	Crowtown	
KY 2618	Dulaney		
KY 2619	Midway		
KY 2620	KY 2613 near Midway	Midway	
KY 2621	KY 2611 near Dulaney	Dulaney	
KY 2622			Removed 1991
KY 2623			Removed 1989
KY 2624			Removed 1989
KY 2625			Removed 1989
KY 2626			Removed 1989
KY 2627	Zion	US 41 in Trenton	Formed 1987
KY 2627			Removed 1978
KY 2628	US 41 in Guthrie	Darnell	Formed 1987
KY 2628			Removed 1978
KY 2629	KY 961 at Alvaton	KY 2158 in Bowling Green	Formed 1987
KY 2629			Removed 1978
KY 2630	KY 526 near Bristow	KY 743 near Girkin	Formed 1987
KY 2630			Removed 1978
KY 2631	KY 263 near Benleo	KY 263 near Richardsville	Formed 1987
KY 2631			Removed 1978
KY 2632	KY 626 near Hadley	US 231 near Blue Level	Formed 1987
KY 2632			Removed 1978
KY 2633			Removed 1989
KY 2634			Removed 1986
KY 2635			Removed 1987
KY 2636			Removed 2006
KY 2637			Removed 2006
KY 2638			Removed 2006
KY 2639			Removed 2006
KY 2640			Removed 2006
KY 2641			Removed 2006
KY 2642			Removed 2006
KY 2643			Removed 1990
KY 2644			Removed 2011
KY 2645			Removed 2011
KY 2646			Removed 2011
KY 2647	US 41 near Daniel Boone	Nortonville	
KY 2648	Nortonville	KY 2647 near Nortonville	
KY 2649			Removed 2011
KY 2650	US 41 near Oak Hill	Oak Hill	
KY 2651	Charleston	KY 1220 near Charleston	
KY 2652	Dawson Springs	KY 1220 near Dawson Springs	
KY 2653			Removed 2011
KY 2654			Removed 1997
KY 2655	Hanson	Vandetta	
KY 2656			Removed 2011
KY 2657	US 41 in Madisonville	Hanson	
KY 2658			Removed 2004
KY 2659			Removed 1989
KY 2660	Madisonville	KY 862 near Hanson	
KY 2661			Removed 2000
KY 2662	Vandetta	KY 1033 near Vandetta	
KY 2663	Hanson	KY 2655 near Hanson	
KY 2664	KY 260 near Hanson	Hanson	
KY 2665	KY 1435 at Barren River	Main Avenue in Bowling Green	Formed 1987
KY 2665			Removed 1978
KY 2666	Elmwood		
KY 2667	Elmwood		
KY 2668	Buford	US 231 near Buford	Formed 1987
KY 2668	Robards	KY 2097 near Robards	Renumbered KY 2095 in 2008
KY 2669			Removed 1991
KY 2670	US 62 near Beaver Dam	KY 1245 in McHenry	Formed 1987
KY 2670			Removed 1982
KY 2671	Magan	KY 54 near Deanefield	Formed 1987
KY 2671			Removed 1982
KY 2672	KY 1526 in Louisville	Bullitt–Jefferson county line	Formed 1987
KY 2672			Removed 1982
KY 2673	KY 61 in Shepherdsville	KY 1020 in Hillview	Formed 1987
KY 2673			Removed 1982
KY 2674	US 31E / US 150 in Mount Washington	KY 44 in Mount Washington	Formed 1987
KY 2674			Removed 1982
KY 2675	Niagra		
KY 2676			Removed 2011
KY 2677	Anthoston		
KY 2678	US 41 in Robards	KY 2096 near Robards	
KY 2679			Removed 2002
KY 2680			Removed 2011
KY 2681	KY 2677 near Anthoston	Anthoston	
KY 2682	Anthoston	KY 136 in Anthoston	
KY 2683			Removed 1991
KY 2684			Removed 1991
KY 2685	KY 2686 near Anthoston	KY 2677 near Anthoston	
KY 2686	KY 2685 near Anthoston	Anthoston	
KY 2687	P&L Railway / Western Kentucky Parkway in Central City	KY 2697 in Central City	
KY 2688			Removed 1990
KY 2689			Removed 2011
KY 2690	Graham	KY 601 in New Cypress	
KY 2691	US 62 in Central City	Mercer	
KY 2692	McNary		
KY 2693	KY 175 near Graham	Graham	
KY 2694	Martwick		
KY 2695	Howerton Road in Muhlenburg County	US 62	
KY 2696	US 62 in Martwick	Martwick	
KY 2697	Stringtown Road in Muhlenburg County	Rural Muhlenburg County	
KY 2698	US 60	KY 81 at Owensboro	
KY 2699	KY 2121 in Owensboro	US 431 in Owensboro	

== 2700-2799 ==
Number	Southern or western terminus	Northern or eastern terminus	Notes
KY 2700			Removed 2005
KY 2701			Removed 2005
KY 2702			Removed 2004
KY 2703			Removed 2004
KY 2704			Removed 1988
KY 2705			Removed 1994
KY 2706	KY 44 west of Mount Washington	US 31EX in Mount Washington	Formed 1987
KY 2706			Removed 1983
KY 2707			
KY 2708	KY 81	Wendell H. Ford Expressway (US 60)	
KY 2709			Removed 2005
KY 2710			Removed 1985
KY 2711	near Beaver Dam	near Beaver Dam	Removed 2020
KY 2712	Beaver Dam	KY 6116 in Cromwell	
KY 2713	KY 79 near Welcome	KY 505 at Windy Hill	
KY 2714	KY 369	Beaver Dam	
KY 2715			Removed 2002
KY 2716			Removed 2014
KY 2717			Removed 2014
KY 2718	US 231	Bruce School Road in Beaver Dam	
KY 2719	Spur from KY 1245 at Echols		Removed 2020
KY 2720	Simmons	KY 1245 near Simmons	
KY 2721			Removed 1984
KY 2722			
KY 2723	KY 44 west of Shepherdsville	KY 44 west of Shepherdsville	Formed 1987
KY 2723			Removed 1983
KY 2724	KY 251 near Belmont	KY 1494 near Bardstown Junction	Formed 1987
KY 2724			Removed by 1982
KY 2725			Removed 1995
KY 2726	KY 1816 near Flaherty	US 60 near Hog Wallow	Formed 1987
KY 2726			Removed 1983
KY 2727	KY 428 in Haysville	KY 144 near Ekron	Formed 1987
KY 2727			Removed 1983
KY 2728			Removed 1983
KY 2729			Removed 1995
KY 2730			Removed 1995
KY 2731	KY 144 near Sirocco	KY 228 near Sirocco	Formed 1987
KY 2731			Removed 1983
KY 2732			Removed 1995
KY 2733			Removed 1995
KY 2734	KY 823 near Payneville	KY 376 near Payneville	Formed 1987
KY 2734			Removed 1983
KY 2735	KY 46 near Balltown	KY 49 in Greenbrier	Formed 1987
KY 2735			Removed 1983
KY 2736	US 62/US 150 in Bardstown	US 62 in Bardstown	Formed 1987; removed 2001
KY 2736			Removed 1983
KY 2737	US 62 in Cravens	KY 1430 in Bardstown	Formed 1987
KY 2737			Removed 1983
KY 2738	KY 55 near Bloomfield	US 62 near Chaplin	Formed 1987
KY 2738			Removed 1983
KY 2739	KY 509 in Coxs Creek	KY 523 in Lenore	Formed 1987
KY 2739			Removed 1983
KY 2740	KY 327 in St. Mary	KY 49 in Loretto	Formed 1987
KY 2740			Removed 1983
KY 2741	KY 412 near Saint Joseph	US 68 in Belltown	Formed 1987
KY 2741			Removed 1983
KY 2742			Removed 1995
KY 2743			Formed 1983; removed 1985
KY 2743			Removed by 1981
KY 2744	KY 208 in Calvary	KY 3221 in Lebanon	Formed 1987
KY 2744			Removed 1983
KY 2745			Removed 1985
KY 2746	Cave City	Horse Case	
KY 2747			Formed 2010; removed 2012
KY 2747			Removed 1999
KY 2748			Removed 1985
KY 2749			Removed 1988
KY 2750	US 150 near Crab Orchard	Turkeytown	Formed 2011
KY 2750			Removed 1985
KY 2751			Removed 1985
KY 2752			Removed 1985
KY 2753			Removed 1985
KY 2754	Bonnieville	KY 728 near Bonnieville	
KY 2755			Removed 1985
KY 2756	Leitchfield Crossing	US 31W near Leitchfield Crossing	
KY 2757			Removed 1993
KY 2758	KY 1404 near Poplar Corner	US 150 in Rineltown	Formed 1987
KY 2758			Removed by 1981
KY 2759	KY 550 near Hindman	KY 160 near Odgen Gap	Formed 1983
KY 2759			Removed by 1981
KY 2760	KY 61 in Tonieville	KY 210 near Tonieville	Formed 1987
KY 2760			Removed by 1981
KY 2761	KY 210 near Tonieville	KY 1607 near Roanoke	Formed 1987
KY 2761			Removed by 1981
KY 2762	KY 61 near Bloyd	KY 210 near Jericho	Formed 1987
KY 2762			Removed by 1981
KY 2763	KY 323 near Summersville	KY 569 in Coakley	Formed 1987
KY 2763			Removed 1978
KY 2764	KY 793 near Black Gnat	US 68 near Wrights	Formed 1987
KY 2764			Removed by 1981
KY 2765	Eve	KY 88 in Webbs	Formed 1987
KY 2765			Removed by 1981
KY 2766	KY 185 near Caneyville	KY 187 near Shrewsbury	Formed 1987
KY 2766			Removed by 1981
KY 2767	Talley	US 31W near Talley	
KY 2768	KY 839 in Forkton	KY 163 near Grandview	Formed 1985
KY 2768			Removed 1978
KY 2769			Removed 2000
KY 2770			Removed 2000
KY 2771			Removed 1993
KY 2772			Removed 1993
KY 2773			Removed 2012
KY 2774			Formed 1987; removed 1993
KY 2774			Removed 1983
KY 2775	Chaplin		
KY 2776			Removed 1993
KY 2777	US 62 near Black Rock	KY 54 near Black Rock	Formed 1987
KY 2777			Removed 1983
KY 2778	KY 1214 near Higdon	KY 224 near Royal	Formed 1987
KY 2778			Removed 1983
KY 2779	KY 259 near Hardinsburg	KY 144 near Stephensport	Formed 1987
KY 2779			Removed 1983
KY 2780	KY 86 near Clifton Mills	KY 261 in Webster	Formed 1987
KY 2780			Removed 1983
KY 2781	KY 333 near Bewleyville	KY 2202 near Basin Spring	Formed 1987
KY 2781			Removed by 1981
KY 2782			Formed 1987; removed 1990
KY 2782			Removed 1983
KY 2783			Removed 2000
KY 2784	KY 70 / KY 1798 in Acton	KY 744 near Spurlington	Formed 1987
KY 2784			Removed by 1980
KY 2785	KY 936 in Jonesville	KY 357 in Hammonville	Formed 1987
KY 2785			Removed by 1980
KY 2786	KY 88 in Kessinger	KY 728 in Lines Mill	Formed 1987
KY 2786			Removed 1980
KY 2787			Removed 1991
KY 2788			Removed 1991
KY 2789			Removed 1991
KY 2790			Removed 1991
KY 2791			Removed 1991
KY 2792	US 27 / KY 1651 in Pine Knot	KY 92 in Bon	Formed 2012
KY 2792			Removed 1991
KY 2793	Renfro Valley		
KY 2794			Removed 1991
KY 2795			Removed 1991
KY 2796			Removed 1991
KY 2797			Removed 1991
KY 2798			Removed 1987
KY 2799			Formed 1987; removed 1991
KY 2799			Removed 1983

== 2800-2899 ==
Number	Southern or western terminus	Northern or eastern terminus	Notes
KY 2800	KY 224 near Riders Mill	KY 720 in Flint Hill	Formed 1987
KY 2800			Removed 1983
KY 2801	I-264 in Louisville	KY 1020 interchange in Louisville	
KY 2802	KY 361 in Elizabethtown	US 31W in Elizabethtown	Formed 1987
KY 2802			Removed 1983
KY 2803	KY 61 in Louisville	I-65–Warnock Street interchange in Louisville	
KY 2804	KY 79 in Post	KY 54 near Black Rock	Formed 1987 as a renumbering of duplicate KY 2770
KY 2804			Removed 1984
KY 2805			Removed 1984
KY 2806			Removed 1984
KY 2807			Removed 1984
KY 2808			Removed 1984
KY 2809	KY 22 in Louisville	KY 22 / I-265 in Louisville	
KY 2810			Removed 2006
KY 2811			Removed 2006
KY 2812			Removed 1993
KY 2813			Removed 1984
KY 2814	Crenshaw	KY 1319 in Whitfield	Formed 1987
KY 2814			Removed 1983
KY 2815	KY 1005 near Benson	KY 12 near Bryant	Formed 1987
KY 2815			Removed 1983
KY 2816			Removed 1984
KY 2817	KY 1665 in Evergreen	US 60 near Broadville Manor	Formed 1987
KY 2817			Removed by 1983
KY 2818			Removed 1984
KY 2819			Removed 1984
KY 2820	KY 151 near Alton	US 127 in Farmdale	Formed 1987
KY 2820			Removed 1983
KY 2821	Big Eddy	US 60 in Frankfort	Formed 1987
KY 2821			Removed 1983
KY 2822	US 460 in Frankfort	KY 1900 near Indian Hills	Formed 1987
KY 2822			Removed 1983
KY 2823			Removed 1984
KY 2824			Removed 1984
KY 2825			Removed 1984
KY 2826			Removed 1984
KY 2827	US 27 in Nicholasville	KY 39 near Nicholasville	Formed 2020
KY 2827			Removed 1984
KY 2828	KY 9 near Flagg Spring	KY 8 in Ivor	Formed 1990
KY 2828			Removed 1984
KY 2829			Removed 1984
KY 2830	KY 144 in Owensboro	KY 304 in Maceo	Formed 1998
KY 2830			Removed 1984
KY 2831	US 60 / US 431 in Owensboro	KY 2245 in Owensboro	Formed 2011
KY 2831			Removed 1984
KY 2832			Removed 1984
KY 2833			Removed 1984
KY 2834	KY 130 in Henshaw	KY 56 near Spring Grove	Formed 1987
KY 2834			Removed 1982
KY 2835	KY 2091 in Breckinridge Center	US 60 in Saint Vincent	Formed 1987
KY 2835			Removed 1982
KY 2836	US 41 Alt. in Jolly	KY 120 in Stanhope	Formed 1987
KY 2836			Removed 1982
KY 2837	KY 109 in Wheatcroft	KY 270 in Hearin	Formed 1987
KY 2837			Removed 1982
KY 2838	KY 270 near Hearin	KY 857 near Shelton	Formed 1987
KY 2838			Removed 1982
KY 2839	KY 132 near Ortiz	US 41 Alt. in Wanamaker	Formed 1987
KY 2839			Removed 1982
KY 2840	KY 913 in Douglass Hills	Main Street in Middletown	Formed 1987
KY 2840			Removed 1982
KY 2841	Loop from US 60 in Louisville		Formed 1987
KY 2841			Removed 1982
KY 2842	US 23 near Savage Branch	KY 757 near Savage Branch	Formed 1986
KY 2842			Removed by 1981
KY 2843			Formed 1998; removed 1999
KY 2843			Formed 1987; removed 1988
KY 2843			Removed by 1981
KY 2844			Formed 1987; removed 1998
KY 2844			Removed 1982
KY 2845	KY 61 in Louisville	KY 864 in Louisville	Formed 1987
KY 2845			Removed 1982
KY 2846	KY 237 in Francisville	KY 8 in Francisville	Formed 1987
KY 2846			Removed 1982
KY 2847	KY 3503 near Devon	US 25 near Devon	Formed 1987
KY 2847			Removed 1982
KY 2848			Formed 1987; removed 2005
KY 2848			Removed 1982
KY 2849			Formed 1987; removed 2005
KY 2849			Removed by 1982
KY 2850	KY 16 near Ryle	US 42 near Hume	Formed 1987
KY 2850			Removed by 1982
KY 2851			Removed 1991
KY 2852			Removed by 1982
KY 2852	KY 338 near Hamilton	KY 536 near Waterloo	Formed 1987
KY 2853	La Grange	KY 712 in La Grange	Formed 1987
KY 2853			Removed by 1977
KY 2854	Greenhaven	KY 146 in La Grange	Formed 1987
KY 2854			Removed by 1977
KY 2855	KY 146 in La Grange	KY 3223 near Russell Corner	Formed 1987
KY 2855			Removed 1982
KY 2856	KY 393 near Buckner	KY 53 near Ballardsville	Formed 1987
KY 2856			Removed 1982
KY 2857	KY 2856 near La Grange	Commerce Parkway in La Grange	Formed 1987
KY 2857			Removed 1982
KY 2858	KY 1818 near Floydsburg	KY 22 near Glenarm	Formed 1987
KY 2858			Removed by 1977
KY 2859	KY 1818 near Ballardsville	KY 22 near Ballardsville	Formed 1987
KY 2859			Removed 1982
KY 2860	US 31E / US 150 in Louisville	US 60 Alt. in Louisville	Formed 1987
KY 2860			Removed by 1977
KY 2861	KY 148 at Olive Branch	US 60 in Shelbyville	Formed 1987
KY 2861			Removed 1978
KY 2862	KY 55 near Shelbyville	US 60 in Shelbyville	Formed 1987
KY 2862			Removed 1978
KY 2863			Removed 2004
KY 2864			Removed 1990
KY 2865			Removed 2016
KY 2866	KY 1790 near Hooper	KY 714 near Hemp Ridge	Formed 1987
KY 2866			Removed 1978
KY 2867	KY 395 in Waddy	KY 1472 near Harrisonville	Formed 1987
KY 2867			Removed 1978
KY 2868	Wises Landing	US 42 near Upper Middle Creek	Formed 1987
KY 2868			Removed 1978
KY 2869	Mount Pleasant	KY 625 in Mount Pleasant	Formed 1987
KY 2869			Removed 1978
KY 2870	Mount Pleasant	US 421 in Callis Grove	Formed 1987
KY 2870			Removed 1978
KY 2871	US 42 near Carmon	KY 1335 near Carmon	Formed 1987
KY 2871			Removed 1978
KY 2872	KY 2881 near Richmond	US 25 / US 421 near Richmond	
KY 2873	KY 2874 in Berea	Farristown	
KY 2874	KY 595 in Berea	Farristown	
KY 2875	US 25 / US 25 Bus. near Arlington	Richmond	
KY 2876	KY 2884 near Blue Grass	Blue Grass	
KY 2877	Whites	KY 2881 near Whites	
KY 2878	US 25 near Hillcrest	KY 627 near Blue Grass	
KY 2879	Hillcrest	KY 2878 near Hillcrest	
KY 2880	Whites		
KY 2881	KY 1983 in Whites	KY 52 in Caleast	
KY 2882			Removed 2011
KY 2883			Removed 2015
KY 2884	I-75 / US 25 near Blue Grass	Blue Grass	
KY 2885	KY 652 near Wakefield	KY 55 in Taylorsville	Formed 1987
KY 2885			Removed 1978
KY 2886	Greendale	US 25 near Greendale	
KY 2887			Removed 1989
KY 2888	KY 1678 near Old Pine Grove	KY 1958 near Bel Air	
KY 2889			Removed 1989
KY 2890	Milton	KY 1256 near Milton	Formed 1987
KY 2890			Removed 1980
KY 2891			Removed 1989
KY 2892			Removed 1989
KY 2893			Removed 1989
KY 2894			Removed 1989
KY 2895			Removed 1990
KY 2896			Removed 1989
KY 2897	KY 19 near Milford	KY 539 near Bratton	Formed 1987
KY 2897			Removed by 1980
KY 2898			Removed 1989
KY 2899			Removed 1993

== 2900-2999 ==
Number	Southern or western terminus	Northern or eastern terminus	Notes
KY 2900			Removed 1989
KY 2901			Removed 1990
KY 2902	Berlin	KY 10 in Berlin	Formed 1987
KY 2902			Removed by 1980
KY 2903	KY 418 in Lexington	US 60 in Lexington	Removed 1989
KY 2904			Removed 1989
KY 2905			Removed 1993
KY 2906	I-75 / US 460 in Georgetown	US 62 in Georgetown	
KY 2907	Porter	US 25 near Sadieville	
KY 2908	Stonewall		Removed 2023
KY 2909	KY 1963 near Clabber Bottom	Clabber Bottom	
KY 2910	Double Culvert	US 25 near Double Culvert	
KY 2911			Removed 2009
KY 2912	Stonewall		Removed 2023
KY 2913	KY 2912 near Stonewall	Stonewall	Removed 2023
KY 2914	Georgetown	Clabber Bottom	
KY 2915	Stonewall		Removed 2023
KY 2916			Removed 1980
KY 2917	KY 923 in Grangertown	KY 109 in Grangertown	
KY 2918	KY 923 in Grangertown	KY 109 in Grangertown	
KY 2919	KY 1707 near Peaks Mill	US 127 near Swallowfield	
KY 2920	Lawrenceburg	US 62 in Lawrenceburg	One of the shortest state highways in the US at 0.013 mi (0.02 km)
KY 2921	KY 1566 near Oneonta	KY 8 near Carthage	Formed 1987
KY 2921			Removed by 1977
KY 2922			Removed 1984
KY 2923			Removed 1984
KY 2924	US 27 in Alexandria	KY 915 in Hawthorne	Formed 1987
KY 2924			Removed by 1977
KY 2925	Hawthorne	Crestview	Formed 1987
KY 2925			Removed by 1980
KY 2926	Cold Spring	KY 445 in Cold Spring	Formed 1987
KY 2926			Removed 1978
KY 2927			Removed 1997
KY 2928			Removed 1997
KY 2929	Mount Sterling		
KY 2930			Removed 2000
KY 2931			Removed 2000
KY 2932			Removed 1997
KY 2933	US 60 / KY 2934 near Counts Crossroads	Counts Crossroads	
KY 2934	Counts Crossroads	US 60 / KY 2933 near Counts Crossroads	
KY 2935	Coalton		
KY 2936	Keefer	US 25 near Blanchet	
KY 2937	KY 22 near Downingsville	US 25 in Williamstown	
KY 2938			Formed 1987; removed 1999
KY 2938			Removed 1983
KY 2939			Removed 1992
KY 2940	Williamstown		
KY 2941			Removed 1995
KY 2942	KY 1942 in Mount Zion	US 25 in Crittenden	
KY 2943	Williamstown	KY 36 in Williamstown	Removed 2021
KY 2944	Curry Lane in Dry Ridge	KY 22 in Dry Ridge	
KY 2945	Carson Lane near Sherman	KY 1994 near Sherman	
KY 2946	Peoples Road near Sherman	KY 2945 near Sherman	
KY 2947			Removed 1991
KY 2948	Sherman	Crittenden	
KY 2949	KY 1112 near Easterday	US 42 near Ghent	Formed 1987
KY 2949			Removed 1983
KY 2950			Removed 1991
KY 2951	KY 338 near Kensington	US 25 near Walton	
KY 2952			Removed 2005
KY 2953			Removed 1991
KY 2954			Removed 2005
KY 2955			Removed 1991
KY 2956			Removed 1989
KY 2957			Removed 1993
KY 2958			Removed 1993
KY 2959			Removed 1993
KY 2960			Removed 1995
KY 2961			Removed 2001
KY 2962			Removed 2005
KY 2963			Removed 2005
KY 2964			Removed 2005
KY 2965			Removed 1997
KY 2966			Removed 1997
KY 2967	Fort Mitchell		
KY 2968	Joppa	KY 80 near Ozark	
KY 2969	KY 206 in Christine	Absher	
KY 2970	KY 206 in Pellyton	KY 70 in Creston	
KY 2971	KY 551 near Absher	Holmes	
KY 2972	KY 767 / KY 2288 near Cane Valley	KY 55 in Cane Valley	
KY 2973	KY 80 in Bliss	KY 61 near Bliss	
KY 2974			Removed by 1981
KY 2975			Removed 2017
KY 2976			Removed by 1981
KY 2977			Removed 1985
KY 2978			Removed 2017
KY 2979			Removed 1997
KY 2980			Removed 1994
KY 2981			Removed 1989
KY 2982	KY 80 near Gradyville	KY 61 in Flatwood	
KY 2983			Removed 1988
KY 2984	KY 36 near Easterday	KY 47 near Carson	Formed 1987
KY 2984			Removed 1979
KY 2985	KY 26 near Wofford	KY 836 near Walden	
KY 2986	Emlyn	US 25W in Emlyn	
KY 2987	US 25W in Goldbug	Goldbug	
KY 2988			Removed by 1981
KY 2989	KY 1259 near Scuffletown	KY 312 in Corbin	
KY 2990			Removed 1988
KY 2991			Removed 1988
KY 2992			Removed 1988
KY 2993	KY 80 near Burnetta	Pointer	Formed 1993
KY 2993			Removed 1988
KY 2994	Pleasant View	KY 2986 near Emlyn	
KY 2995	KY 2996 near Saxton	Mountain Ash	
KY 2996	US 25W in Saxton	KY 628 near Pleasant View	
KY 2997	Providence	KY 389 near English	Formed 1987
KY 2997			Removed 1979
KY 2998	Fairview	KY 1804 in Fairview	
KY 2999			Removed 1988

== See also ==
- List of primary state highways in Kentucky
