= List of Kentucky supplemental roads and rural secondary highways (2000–2499) =

Kentucky supplemental roads and rural secondary highways (2000–2499)
- Highway markers for KY 2000 and KY 2499

Highway names
- Interstates: Interstate nn (I-nn)
- US Highways: U.S. Highway nn (US nn)
- State: KY nn

System links
- Kentucky State Highway System; Interstate; US; State; Parkways
- Supplemental/Rural Secondary; 1–199; 200–299; 300–399; 400–499; 500–599; 600–699; 700–799; 800–899; 900–999; 1000–1499; 1500–1999; 2000–2499; 2500–2999; 3000–3499; 3500–6999

Kentucky supplemental roads and rural secondary highways are the lesser two of the four functional classes of highways constructed and maintained by the Kentucky Transportation Cabinet, the state-level agency that constructs and maintains highways in Kentucky. The agency splits its inventory of state highway mileage into four categories:

- The State Primary System includes Interstate Highways, Parkways, and other long-distance highways of statewide importance that connect the state's major cities, including much of the courses of Kentucky's U.S. Highways.
- The State Secondary System includes highways of regional importance that connect the state's smaller urban centers, including those county seats not served by the state primary system.
- The Rural Secondary System includes highways of local importance, such as farm-to-market roads and urban collectors.
- Supplemental Roads are the set of highways not in the first three systems, including frontage roads, bypassed portions of other state highways, and rural roads that only serve their immediate area.

The same-numbered highway can comprise sections of road under different categories. This list contains descriptions of Supplemental Roads and highways in the Rural Secondary System numbered 2000 to 2499 that do not have portions within the State Primary and State Secondary systems.

== KY 2000 ==
Kentucky Route 2000
- Location: Goose Rock - Creekville
- Length: 9.092 mi (14.632 km)

Kentucky Route 2000 is a 9.092-mile long (14.632 km) rural secondary highway in Clay County. It begins at an intersection with KY 1524 south of Goose Rock, then travels eastward paralleling Martins and Flat Creeks through Plank to its terminus at KY 66 in Creekville.

== KY 2001 ==
Kentucky Route 2001
- Location: Estill and Powell County, Kentucky
- Length: 3.816 mi (6.141 km)

Kentucky Route 2001, also known as Spout Springs Road, is a 3.816-mile long (6.141 km) rural secondary highway in Estill and Powell Counties. It begins at an intersection with KY 82 in eastern Estill County, in which it travels for 0.693 miles, then crosses into Powell County and ends at an intersection with KY 1057 approximately 2.5 miles south of Clay City.

== KY 2002 ==
Kentucky Route 2002
- Location: Peoples, Parrot
- Length: 5.300 mi (8.530 km)

Kentucky Route 2002 is a 5.300-mile long (8.530 km) rural secondary highway in Jackson County. It begins in Peoples at an intersection with KY 3630, then goes north through the village of Parrot, where it intersects with KY 2003, and ends at an intersection with KY 89 after crossing the Middle Fork Rockcastle River.

== KY 2003 ==
Kentucky Route 2003
- Location: Parrot-Annville through Dabolt
- Length: 6.578 mi (10.586 km)

Kentucky Route 2003 is a 6.578-mile long (10.586 km) rural secondary highway in Jackson County. It begins in Parrot at an intersection with KY 2002, then travels eastward through the community of Dabolt to its terminus at an intersection with KY 290 north of Annville.

== KY 2004 ==
Kentucky Route 2004
- Location: Sandgap-Alcorn
- Length: 14.230 mi (22.901 km)

Kentucky Route 2004 is a 14.230-mile long (22.901 km) rural secondary highway in Jackson County. It begins in Sandgap at an intersection with U. S. 421, then travels in a northwesterly direction through Kerby Knob, where it intersects KY 3447, then it continues northwest to an intersection with Crowley Mountain Road where the road turns to the east, continuing for 7 miles before heading into the community of Alcorn where the road ends state maintenance.

== KY 2005 ==
Kentucky Route 2005
- Location: Pathfork
- Length: 5.100 mi (8.208 km)

Kentucky Route 2005 is a 5.100-mile long (8.208 km) rural secondary highway in Harlan County. It begins near the Bell County line at an intersection with KY 987, then travels north across Puckett Creek to its terminus at an intersection with KY 72 in Pathfork.

== KY 2006 ==
Kentucky Route 2006
- Location: Cumberland
- Length: 5.083 mi (8.180 km)

Kentucky Route 2006 is a 5.083-mile long (8.180 km) rural secondary highway in Harlan County. It begins at a dead end at the end of Cloverlick Creek, then parallels the creek until reaching its terminus at KY 179 in Cumberland. KY 2006 and KY 179 intersect on the campus of the Southeast Kentucky Community and Technical College.

== KY 2007 ==
Kentucky Route 2007
- Location: Coldiron-Wallins Creek
- Length: 3.319 mi (5.341 km)

Kentucky Route 2007 is a 3.319-mile long (5.341 km) rural secondary highway in Harlan County. It begins in the town of Coldiron at an intersection with U.S. 119, crosses over the Cumberland River and travels east before ending in Wallins Creek at an intersection with KY 219. Along the way it has intersections with Kentucky Routes 3449 and 3467.

== KY 2008 ==
Kentucky Route 2008
- Location: Chappell-Big Laurel
- Length: 10.034 mi (16.148 km)

Kentucky Route 2008 is a 10.034-mile long (16.148 km) rural secondary highway in Leslie and Harlan Counties. It begins in Leslie County south of Chappell at an intersection with KY 2009, then travels eastbound 8.638 miles in Leslie County and 1.396 miles in Harlan County before ending in Big Laurel at KY 221.

== KY 2009 ==
Kentucky Route 2009
- Location: Hoskinston-Bledsoe
- Length: 18.028 mi (29.013 km)

Kentucky Route 2009 is an 18.028-mile long (29.013 km) rural secondary highway in Leslie and Harlan Counties. It begins at an intersection with KY 221 east of Bledsoe and continues northward paralleling Greasy Creek to an intersection with U.S. 421 in Hoskinston, meeting KY 2008 just south of Chappell.

== KY 2010 ==
Kentucky Route 2010
- Location: Lejunior-Pine Mountain
- Length: 5.418 mi (8.719 km)

Kentucky Route 2010 is a 5.418-mile long (8.719 km) rural secondary highway in Harlan County. It begins just south of Lejunior at an intersection with U.S. 119, then travels north 0.157 miles to KY 522, which it has a short concurrency with. The route then continues to the north for another 3 miles before sharing another short concurrency with KY 1679, then travels another 2 miles north and west to its terminus at KY 221 southwest of Pine Mountain.

== KY 2011 ==
Kentucky Route 2011
- Location: Stoney Fork-Beverly
- Length: 9.006 mi (14.494 km)

Kentucky Route 2011 is a 9.006-mile long (14.494 km) rural secondary highway in Bell County. It starts in the town of Stoney Fork at an intersection with KY 221, then parallels Stoney Fork and Red Bird Creek northbound to its terminus just north of Beverly at an intersection with KY 66.

== KY 2012 ==
Kentucky Route 2012
- Location: Tejay-Callaway
- Length: 1.950 mi (3.138 km)

Kentucky Route 2012 is a 1.950-mile long (3.138 km) supplemental road in Bell County. It begins in the town of Tejay at an intersection with Hen Wilder Branch Road, and continues northwest to an intersection with U.S. 119 in Callaway.

== KY 2013 ==
Kentucky Route 2013
- Location: Jenson-Kettle Island
- Length: 1.996 mi (3.212 km)

Kentucky Route 2013 is a 1.996-mile long (3.212 km) rural secondary highway in Bell County. It begins in Jenson at an intersection with KY 221, then parallels KY 221 and Straight Creek until its terminus in Kettle Island at an intersection with KY 1630.

== KY 2050 ==
Kentucky Route 2050
- Location: Louisville
- Length: 2.182 mi (3.512 km)

Kentucky Route 2050, also known as Herr Lane, is a 2.182-mile-long (3.512 km) state highway in Louisville in Jefferson County. The highway begins at KY 146 and heads northward and ends at KY 22.

Major intersections

The entire route is in Louisville, Jefferson County.

mi	km	Destinations	Notes
0.000	0.000	KY 146	Southern terminus
1.031	1.659	KY 1447 (Westport Road)	
2.182	3.512	KY 22	Northern terminus
1.000 mi = 1.609 km; 1.000 km = 0.621 mi

== KY 2053 ==
Kentucky Route 2053
- Location: Louisville
- Length: 7.184 mi (11.562 km)

Kentucky Route 2053 is a 7.184-mile-long (11.562 km) rural secondary highway in far southern part of the city of Louisville in Jefferson County. The highway begins at KY 61 (Preston Highway); immediately east of KY 61, the route meets the south end of KY 6305 (Faithful Way), a piece of old alignment of KY 61. KY 2053 heads east along Mount Washington Road. At the southern terminus of KY 864 (Cedar Creek Road), KY 2053 turns south and back east again and parallels the Jefferson–Bullitt county line. Along the part close to the county line, the route meets the north end of KY 1116 (Thixton Lane) and continues east along Thixton Lane. KY 2053 continues northeast and passes through several right-angle turns on its way to its eastern terminus at US 31E and US 150 (Bardstown Road) in the Thixton neighborhood of Louisville. The Kentucky Transportation Cabinet extended the KY 2053 designation slightly west through a March 24, 1988, official order when KY 61 was relocated at their intersection.

== KY 2055 ==
Kentucky Route 2055
- Location: Louisville
- Length: 4.206 mi (6.769 km)

Kentucky Route 2055 is a 4.206-mile-long (6.769 km) rural secondary highway in the southwestern part of the city of Louisville in Jefferson County. The highway begins at KY 1020 (National Turnpike) and follows Mount Holly Road northwest to a roundabout at Fairdale Road in the Fairdale neighborhood of Louisville. KY 2055 continues north on West Manslick Road, which meets the south end of KY 1865 (New Cut Road). The highway continues northwest and crosses over KY 841 (Gene Snyder Expressway) before reaching its northern terminus at KY 907 (Third Street Road).

== KY 2056 ==
Kentucky Route 2056
- Location: Louisville
- Length: 1.589 mi (2.557 km)

Kentucky Route 2056 is a 1.589-mile-long (2.557 km) rural secondary highway in the northwestern part of the city of Louisville in Jefferson County. The highway begins at a dead end near the flood wall along the Ohio River. KY 2056 heads east along Bells Lane, which briefly expands to four lanes at its diamond interchange with I-264 (Shawnee Expressway); the northern half of the interchange also connects Bells Lane to and from the one-way pair of 39th Street northbound and 40th Street southbound on either side of the freeway. KY 2056 continues east to its terminus at KY 1934 (Cane Run Road).

== KY 2067 ==
Kentucky Route 2067
- Location: Moutardier
- Length: 1.108 mi (1.783 km)

Kentucky Route 2067 is a 1.108-mile-long (1.783 km) rural secondary highway on both sides of the border between Edmonson County and Grayson County. The highway begins at Boat Ramp Road on a peninsula along Nolin River Lake in Edmonson County. KY 2067 heads north across the county line to its terminus at KY 259 at Moutardier.

== KY 2107 ==
Kentucky Route 2107
- Location: Drakesboro–Central City
- Length: 4.742 mi (7.632 km)

Kentucky Route 2107 is a 4.742-mile-long (7.632 km) supplemental road in eastern Muhlenberg County. The highway begins at US 431 and KY 70 at the north city limit of Drakesboro. KY 2107 splits northeast from the U.S. Highway and crosses over a CSX rail line and Pond Creek. The highway passes by the hamlets of Nonnell, Bevier, and Holt and passes through Cleaton. KY 2107 reaches its northern terminus at US 431 and KY 70 south of Central City.

== KY 2128 ==
Kentucky Route 2128
- Location: Guthrie
- Length: 0.201 mi (323 m)

Kentucky Route 2128 is a 0.201-mile-long (0.323 km) supplemental road in the city of Guthrie in southern Todd County. The highway follows Port Royal Road from the Tennessee state line, from which the road continues as Tennessee State Route 238 south to Port Royal, north along the west city limit of Guthrie to a four-legged intersection with US 79 and KY 181 (Greenville Road).

== KY 2131 ==
Kentucky Route 2131
- Location: Coral Hill–Halfway
- Length: 4.000 mi (6.437 km)
- Existed: 1994–present

Kentucky Route 2131 is a 4.000-mile-long (6.437 km) rural secondary highway in northeastern Barren County. The highway begins at KY 740 (Coral Hill Road) near Coral Hill. KY 2131 heads northeast along Coral Hill–Halfway Road to KY 70 (Hiseville Road) near Halfway. The Kentucky Transportation Cabinet established KY 2131 through a February 1, 1994, official order.

== KY 2140 ==
Kentucky Route 2140
- Location: State Line-Hickman
- Length: 4.271 mi (6.874 km)
- Existed: 1987–present

Kentucky Route 2140 is a 4.271-mile-long (6.874 km) rural secondary highway in central Hickman County. The highway begins at KY 125 in State Line and heads northward, crossing KY 166, KY 1128, and KY 1129 before reaching its terminus at KY 94 near Hickman. The Kentucky Transportation Cabinet established KY 2140 through an April 2, 1987, official order.

== KY 2143 ==
Kentucky Route 2143
- Location: Cave City
- Length: 1.238 mi (1.992 km)
- Existed: 1994–present

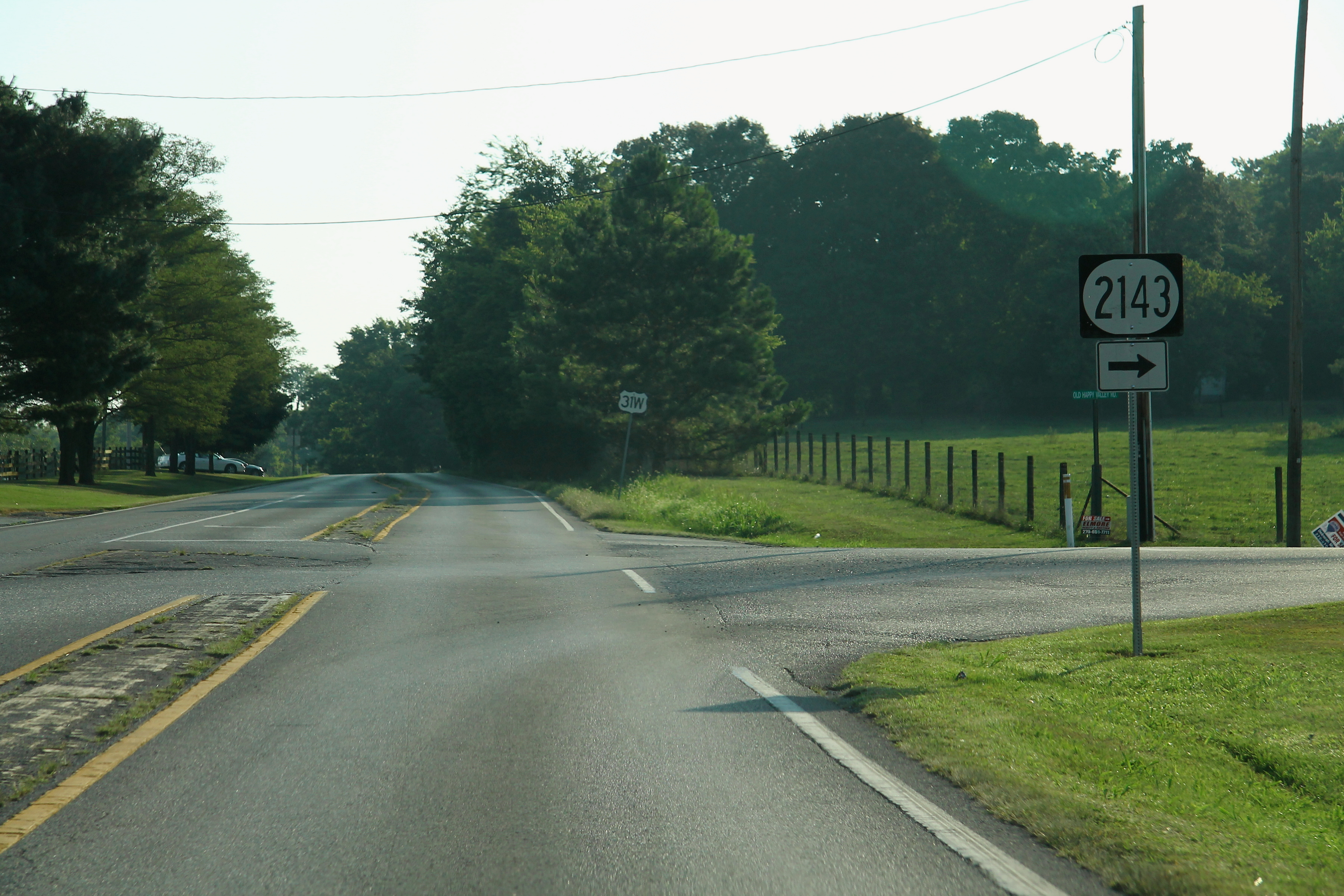
US 31W at KY 2143

Kentucky Route 2143 is a 1.238-mile-long (1.992 km) rural secondary highway near Cave City in northwestern Barren County. The highway begins at US 31E (Louisville Road) southwest of Cave City. KY 2131 follows Old Happy Valley Road southeast to KY 685 (Stovall Road) near that highway's junction with KY 90 (Happy Valley Road) south of Cave City. The Kentucky Transportation Cabinet established KY 2143 through a February 1, 1994, official order. KY 2143 was originally Happy Valley Road, then designated as KY 351, which had gone from the US 31W/US 68 intersection to downtown Glasgow since the 1930s. In the 1950s, KY 90 was extended to include this particular road until it was rerouted to head into Cave City directly in the late 1960s or early 1970s. This change gave the now KY 2143 the local road name Old Happy Valley Road.

== KY 2149 ==
Kentucky Route 2149
- Location: Fulton
- Length: 2.236 mi (3.598 km)
- Existed: 1987–present

Kentucky Route 2149 is a 2.236-mile-long (3.598 km) rural secondary highway in southeastern Fulton County. The highway begins at KY 1909 northwest of Fulton and follows Airport Road eastward, passing the Fulton Airport, to its terminus at US 51. The Kentucky Transportation Cabinet established KY 2149 through an April 2, 1987, official order.

== KY 2150 ==
Kentucky Route 2150
- Location: Fulton
- Length: 0.677 mi (1,090 m)
- Existed: 1987–present

Kentucky Route 2150 is a 0.677-mile long (1.090 km) rural secondary highway in the city of Fulton in southeastern Fulton County. The highway begins at KY 129 just east of Fulton and heads northward to its terminus at the Hickman County line. The Kentucky Transportation Cabinet established KY 2150 through an April 2, 1987, official order.

== KY 2161 ==
Kentucky Route 2161
- Location: Morgantown
- Length: 0.750 mi (1,207 m)

Kentucky Route 2161 is a 0.750-mile-long (1.207 km) supplemental road in the city of Morgantown in central Butler County. The J-shaped route begins at the intersection of Main Street and W.G.L. Smith Street in downtown Morgantown next to the Butler County Courthouse and the join Confederate-Union veterans monument on the courthouse grounds. US 231 heads south along Main Street and west along W.G.L. Smith Street, and KY 2161 heads north along Main Street. One block north of its terminus, the highway meets the eastern end of KY 2162 (Ohio Street). Four blocks north, KY 2161 turns west onto Cemetery Street, which runs one way toward the west; two blocks later, the route turns south onto Ward Avenue; and two blocks further the highway reaches its terminus at the intersection of Ward Avenue and Morrison Street.

== KY 2162 ==
Kentucky Route 2162
- Location: Morgantown
- Length: 0.547 mi (880 m)

Kentucky Route 2162 is a 0.547-mile-long (0.880 km) supplemental road in the city of Morgantown in central Butler County. The highway begins at a four-legged intersection between Logansport Road, which carries KY 403 west, and Veterans Way, which carries KY 70 to the south and both highways for one block north to W.G.L. Smith Street. KY 2162 heads east along Logansport Road and crosses Big Branch of the Green River before its oblique intersection with W.G.L. Smith Street, which carries US 231, KY 79, and KY 403. At the west edge of downtown Morgantown, the highway veers onto Ohio Street and reaches its eastern terminus at KY 2161 (Main Street).

== KY 2171 ==
Kentucky Route 2171
- Location: Hopkins County
- Length: 3.474 mi (5.591 km)

Kentucky Route 2171 is a state secondary road in southeast Hopkins County, Kentucky. The highway begins at United States Route 41 south of Madisonville, Kentucky. KY 2171 heads east, goes under Interstate 69, and comes to a dead end a bit further east of Interstate 69. Drivers may take a jog and continue east on McLeod Rd.

== KY 2182 ==
Kentucky Route 2182
- Location: Brownsville
- Length: 0.696 mi (1,120 m)

Kentucky Route 2182 is a 0.058-mile-long (0.093 km) supplemental road in the city of Brownsville in central Edmonson County. The highway follows Cross Street for one block between Main Street, on which KY 70 and KY 259 run concurrently, and Washington Street, which carries KY 2184.

== KY 2184 ==
Kentucky Route 2184
- Location: Brownsville
- Length: 0.696 mi (1,120 m)

Kentucky Route 2184 is a 0.696-mile-long (1.120 km) supplemental road in the city of Brownsville in central Edmonson County. The highway follows Washington Street, which parallels Main Street, on which KY 70 and KY 259 run concurrently, between a pair of intersections with those routes at the south end of downtown and the south end of Main Street's bridge across the Green River. In the center of town, KY 2184 intersects KY 2182, which follows Cross Street between the parallel routes.

== KY 2189 ==
Kentucky Route 2189
- Location: Glasgow–Park City
- Length: 6.010 mi (9.672 km)
- Existed: 1987–present

Kentucky Route 2189 is a 6.010-mile-long (9.672 km) rural secondary highway in western Barren County. The highway begins at US 68 and KY 80, which run concurrently along New Bowling Green Road west of Glasgow. KY 2189 heads north along Park City–Glasgow Road, which crosses Little Beaver Creek and intersects KY 685 (Stovall Road) near Stovall. The highway has a grade crossing of the CSX-operated Glasgow Railway before reaching its northern terminus at US 31W (Louisville Road) on the east side of Park City. The Kentucky Transportation Cabinet established KY 2189 through an April 8, 1987, official order.

== KY 2195 ==
Kentucky Route 2195
- Location: Cave City–Bear Wallow
- Length: 5.460 mi (8.787 km)
- Existed: 1987–present

Kentucky Route 2195 is a 5.460-mile-long (8.787 km) rural secondary highway that straddles the Barren–Hart county line. The highway begins at KY 70 (Griderville Road) at the east city limit of Cave City in northwestern Barren County. KY 2195 heads east along Old Lexington Road. The highway enters Hart County, in which it is named Cave City–Bear Wallow Road, and passes just north of the county line through a junction with the southern end of KY 1141 (Bear Wallow Road) to its eastern terminus with US 31E (Jackson Highway) at Bear Wallow. The Kentucky Transportation Cabinet established KY 2195 in Barren County through an April 8, 1987, official order. The agency added the Hart County portion of the highway via an October 15, 2003, official order.

== KY 2201 ==
Kentucky Route 2201
- Location: Axtel
- Length: 1.893 mi (3.046 km)

Kentucky Route 2201 is a 1.893-mile-long (3.046 km) supplemental road in Breckinridge County that begins at a junction with KY 105 and KY 79 heading west along M-Houk Lane to the junction again with KY 105

== KY 2227 ==
Kentucky Route 2227
- Location: Somerset
- Length: 3.278 mi (5.275 km)

Kentucky Route 2227 is a 3.278-mile-long (5.275 km) urban secondary highway in the city of Somerset in Pulaski. The north–south highway begins at US 27 and travels north intersecting KY 1575 before terminating at KY 1247. From 1958 to 2007 this route was US 27, but was moved for widening and the Cumberland Parkway interchange.

== KY 2230 ==
Kentucky Route 2230
- Location: Nelson County
- Length: 0.436 mi (702 m)

Kentucky Route 2230 is a 0.436 miles (0.702 km) supplemental road in eastern Nelson County. The road begins just south of the Bluegrass Parkway at Old Brown's Lane and travels northwest to US 62.

== KY 2240 ==
Kentucky Route 2240
- Location: Railton–Merry Oaks
- Length: 3.137 mi (5.049 km)
- Existed: 1987–present

Kentucky Route 2240 is a 3.137-mile-long (5.049 km) rural secondary highway in western Barren County. The highway begins at KY 1297 (Old Bowling Green Road) at Railton. KY 2240 heads north along Merry Oaks–Railton Road, which crosses Sinking Creek. The highway reaches its northern end at US 68 and KY 80, which run concurrently along New Bowling Green Road, at Merry Oaks. The Kentucky Transportation Cabinet established KY 2240 through an April 8, 1987, official order.

== KY 2241 ==
Kentucky Route 2241
- Location: Louisville
- Length: 0.111 mi (179 m)

Kentucky Route 2241, also known as Willis Avenue, is a 0.111-mile-long (0.179 km) state highway in Louisville in Jefferson County. The highway begins at KY 1932 and heads east and ends at US 60.

== KY 2243 ==
Kentucky Route 2243
- Location: Spottsville
- Length: 3.019 mi (4.859 km)

Kentucky Route 2243 is a 3.019-mile long (4.859 km) rural secondary highway in Spottsville in Henderson County. The highway begins at US 60 and follows an old route of US 60 into Spottsville, where it turns north onto Spring Street until the route's terminus at a four-way intersection with US 60 and KY 1078, at the west end of U. S. 60's bridge across the Green River. The Kentucky Transportation Cabinet established KY 2243 through a March 30, 1987 official order.

== KY 2245 ==
Kentucky Route 2245
- Location: Owensboro
- Length: 0.246 mi (396 m)

Kentucky Route 2245 is a 0.246-mile-long (396 m) one-way supplemental road. It runs along 5th Street. Which is part of the road from KY 2262 to KY 2831.

== KY 2251 ==
Kentucky Route 2251
- Location: Louisville
- Length: 1.192 mi (1.918 km)

Kentucky Route 2251, also known as Bardstown Road, is a 1.192-mile-long (1.918 km) state highway in Louisville in Jefferson County. The highway begins at US 31E and US 150 and heads northeast and ends at US 31E and US 150. KY 2251 is a former routing of US 31E and US 150 before the Buechel Bypass was built.

== KY 2256 ==
Kentucky Route 2256
- Location: Graefenburg
- Length: 0.436 mi (702 m)

Kentucky Route 2256 is a 0.436-mile-long (0.702 km) rural secondary highway at Graefenburg in eastern Shelby County. The highway follows Graefenburg Road from KY 1472, which heads northwest along Graefenburg Road and south along Hickory Road Road, northeast along Goose Creek to US 60 (Frankfort Road) just west of Benson Creek, a tributary of the Kentucky River that forms the Shelby–Franklin county line.

== KY 2258 ==
Kentucky Route 2258
- Location: Shelbyville
- Length: 0.361 mi (581 m)
- Existed: 2007–present

Kentucky Route 2258 is a 0.361-mile-long (0.581 km) supplemental road near Shelbyville in central Shelby County. The highway begins at KY 53 (Mount Eden Road) east of Shelbyville. KY 2258 heads east on Old Seven Mile Pike then turns north on an unnamed road to its end at a Kentucky Transportation Cabinet maintenance facility. The highway also provides access to the historic Brackett Owen House. The Kentucky Transportation Cabinet established KY 2258 through an October 11, 2007, official order.

== KY 2259 ==
Kentucky Route 2259
- Location: Frankfort
- Length: 0.785 mi (1,263 m)

Kentucky Route 2259 is a 0.785-mile-long (1.263 km) supplemental road in the city of Frankfort in central Franklin County. The highway, which follows Shelby Street, begins where Shelby Street curves onto Tanglewood Drive, which leads to the historic home Point Breeze. KY 2259 heads north and intersects KY 2271 (Lafayette Drive) west of the Kentucky State Capitol and the Kentucky Governor's Mansion. The highway continues through the Frankfort Barracks District, by the Rev. Jesse R. Zeigler House, and through the South Frankfort Neighborhood Historic District. KY 2259 passes the Gov. Charles S. Morehead House immediately before reaching its northern terminus at US 60 (Second Street) in the Central Frankfort Historic District.

== KY 2263 ==
Kentucky Route 2263
- Location: Rochester
- Length: 0.434 mi (698 m)
- Existed: 1987–2018

Kentucky Route 2263 was a 0.434-mile-long (0.698 km) supplemental road in the city of Rochester in northwestern Butler County. The highway began at KY 70 (Rochester Road) next to the confluence of the Mud River and the Green River. KY 2263 headed east along Russellville Street and curved south to its terminus at KY 369, which heads north along Creamery Street and south along Russellville Street through downtown Rochester. The Kentucky Transportation Cabinet established KY 2263 through an April 8, 1987, official order. KY 2263 was decommissioned on June 1, 2018.

== KY 2265 ==
Kentucky Route 2265
- Location: Louisville
- Length: 0.145 mi (233 m)

Kentucky Route 2265 is a 0.145-mile-long (0.233 km) supplemental road in the city of Louisville in eastern Jefferson County. The highway connects Old Taylorsville Road with KY 155 (Taylorsville Road) north of Floyds Fork of the Salt River and west of the Fisherville neighborhood of Louisville.

== KY 2266 ==
Kentucky Route 2266
- Location: Jetson
- Length: 4.134 mi (6.653 km)
- Existed: 1987–present

Kentucky Route 2266 is a 4.134-mile-long (6.653 km) rural secondary highway in eastern Butler County. The highway begins at the maintenance boundary along Milshed Road north of the Green River between Big Bull Creek and Little Reedy Creek. KY 2266 heads north to its terminus at KY 1328, which heads west along Leonard Oak Road and north along Milshed Road to its terminus at KY 70 (Brownsville Road) at Jetson. The Kentucky Transportation Cabinet established KY 2266 through an April 8, 1987, official order.

== KY 2267 ==
Kentucky Route 2267
- Location: Leetown–Dunbar
- Length: 4.426 mi (7.123 km)
- Existed: 1987–present

Kentucky Route 2267 is a 4.426-mile-long (7.123 km) rural secondary highway in central Butler County. The highway begins at KY 1153 (Sandy Creek Road) at Leetown. KY 2267 heads north along Dunbar Leetown Road, which crosses Sandy Creek, part of the Green River watershed, before reaching its northern terminus at KY 70 (Rochester Road) at Dunbar. The Kentucky Transportation Cabinet established KY 2267 through an April 8, 1987, official order.

== KY 2268 ==
Kentucky Route 2268
- Location: Shelbyville
- Length: 1.388 mi (2.234 km)
- Existed: 1992–present

Kentucky Route 2268 is a 1.388-mile-long (2.234 km) supplemental road near Shelbyville in central Shelby County. The highway begins at the south end of the highway's bridge across Clear Creek, part of the Salt River watershed, at the north city limit of Shelbyville. KY 2268 follows 7th Street north to Eminence Pike, onto which the highway heads northeast. The highway parallels an R.J. Corman Railroad Group rail line and Mulberry Creek northeast to its terminus at a four-legged intersection with KY 43 (Cropper Road) and KY 55 Business, which heads south along Boone Station Road and north along Eminence Pike. The Kentucky Transportation Cabinet moved KY 55 to Boone Station Road, established KY 2268 along the old course of KY 55 outside of Shelbyville, and transferred 7th Street from Clear Creek south to US 60 in the city of Shelbyville to municipal maintenance through a June 29, 1992, official order.

== KY 2269 ==
Kentucky Route 2269
- Location: Gilstrap–Dexterville
- Length: 3.365 mi (5.415 km)
- Existed: 1987–present

Kentucky Route 2269 is a 3.365-mile-long (5.415 km) rural secondary highway in northern Butler County. The highway begins at KY 1118 (Gilstrap Road) at Gilstrap. KY 2269 heads east along Dexterville–Gilstrap Road, which crosses Indian Camp Creek, a tributary of the Green River, before reaching its eastern terminus at KY 2713 (Dexterville Banock Road) at Dexterville. The Kentucky Transportation Cabinet established KY 2269 through an April 8, 1987, official order.

== KY 2270 ==
Kentucky Route 2270
- Location: Rosewood–Ennis
- Length: 10.831 mi (17.431 km)

Kentucky Route 2270 is a 10.831-mile-long (17.431 km) rural secondary highway in southeastern Muhlenberg County. The highway begins at KY 973 east of Rosewood. KY 2270 heads northeast to Belton, where the highway has a closely staggered pair of intersections with US 431 and crosses Hazel Creek, a tributary of the Mud River. The highway crosses two more tributaries of the Mud River on its way to its northeast end at KY 70 (Rochester Road) at Ennis.

== KY 2297 ==
Kentucky Route 2297
- Location: Somerset
- Length: 0.222 mi (357 m)

Kentucky Route 2297 is a 0.222-mile-long (0.357 km) rural secondary highway in the city of Somerset in central Pulaski County. The east–west highway connects US 27 (Burnside Road) and KY 2292 (Monticello Street) in the south end of the city.

== KY 2303 ==
Kentucky Route 2303
- Location: Somerset
- Length: 0.362 mi (583 m)

Kentucky Route 2303 is a 0.362-mile-long (0.583 km) urban secondary highway in the city of Somerset in central Pulaski County. The east–west highway connects KY 1247 and KY 80.

== KY 2308 ==
Kentucky Route 2308
- Location: Science Hill
- Length: 0.311 mi (501 m)

Kentucky Route 2308 is a 0.311-mile-long (0.501 km) urban secondary highway in Science Hill in Pulaski County. The north–south highway connects KY 1247 and KY 635.

== KY 2309 ==
Kentucky Route 2309
- Location: Science Hill
- Length: 0.765 mi (1,231 m)

Kentucky Route 2309 is a 0.765-mile-long (1.231 km) urban secondary highway in Science Hill in Pulaski County. The north–south highway connects KY 1247 and KY 635.

== KY 2312 ==
Kentucky Route 2312
- Location: Liberty
- Length: 0.102 mi (164 m)

Kentucky Route 2312 is a 0.102-mile-long (0.164 km) supplemental road in the city of Liberty in central Casey County. The U-shaped highway partially circumscribes the Casey County Courthouse between a pair of intersections with KY 70 Business (Campbellsville Street) in the Liberty Downtown Historic District. KY 2312's eastern intersection is also the southern terminus of KY 49 (Hustonville Street).

== KY 2313 ==
Kentucky Route 2313
- Location: Liberty
- Length: 0.398 mi (641 m)

Kentucky Route 2313 is a 0.398-mile-long (0.641 km) rural secondary highway in the city of Liberty in central Casey County. The highway follows Randolph Street from US 127 (Wallace Wilkinson Boulevard) north to KY 70 Business (Middleburg Road) in downtown Liberty.

== KY 2325 ==
Kentucky Route 2325
- Location: Pig–Arthur
- Length: 2.023 mi (3.256 km)
- Existed: 1987–present

Kentucky Route 2325 is a 2.023-mile-long (3.256 km) rural secondary highway in eastern Edmonson County. The highway begins at KY 259 (Brownsville Road) near Pig. KY 2325 follows Silent Grove Church Road north to its terminus at a three-legged intersection with KY 70 (Mammoth Cave Road) and Brownsville Parkway near Arthur. Brownsville Park heads east through Mammoth Cave National Park and connects with another segment of KY 70 on the east side of the national park. The Kentucky Transportation Cabinet established KY 2325 through an April 8, 1987, official order.

== KY 2326 ==
Kentucky Route 2326
- Location: Tuckertown–Chalybeate
- Length: 3.510 mi (5.649 km)
- Existed: 1987–present

Kentucky Route 2326 is a 3.510-mile-long (5.649 km) rural secondary highway in eastern Warren County and southwestern Edmonson County. The highway begins at US 31W (Louisville Road) near Tuckertown in Warren County. KY 2326 heads north, crosses the county line, and continues on Otter Gap Road to its north end at KY 743 west of Chalybeate. The Kentucky Transportation Cabinet established KY 2326 through a pair of April 8, 1987, official orders.

== KY 2328 ==
Kentucky Route 2328
- Location: Kentucky River
- Length: 2.695 mi (4.337 km)

Kentucky Route 2328 is a 2.695-mile-long (4.337 km) supplemental road in northern Madison County and southeastern Fayette County. The highway runs between a pair of intersections with US 25 and US 421 on either side of the Madison–Fayette county line at the Kentucky River; US 25 and US 421 run concurrently with I-75 across the river. KY 2328 begins at US 25 and US 421 west of the U.S. Highways' diamond interchange with the Interstate south of the Kentucky River in Madison County. The highway follows Lexington Road as it descends to the river with a pair of hairpin turns. KY 2328 passes under I-75, crosses the river on the Clays Ferry Bridge into Fayette County and the city of Lexington, and passes under the Interstate again. The highway ascends out of the river gorge along Old Richmond Road and reaches its northern terminus at a partial cloverleaf interchange with I-75; US 25 and US 421 leave the Interstate and head north along Old Richmond Road.

== KY 2330 ==
Kentucky Route 2330
- Location: Sunfish
- Length: 2.408 mi (3.875 km)
- Existed: 1987–present

Kentucky Route 2330 is a 2.408-mile-long (3.875 km) rural secondary highway in northwestern Edmonson County. The highway begins at KY 187 (Sunfish Road) just south of that highway's crossing of Sunfish Creek, part of the Green River watershed, south of Sunfish. KY 2330 heads north along Sunfish Sunny Point Road and crosses Salt Well Branch before reaching its northern terminus at KY 1075 (Sunny Point Road) northwest of Sunfish. The Kentucky Transportation Cabinet established KY 2330 through an April 8, 1987, official order.

== KY 2333 ==
Kentucky Route 2333
- Location: Paintsville
- Length: 0.647 mi (1,041 m)
- Existed: 1996–present

Kentucky Route 2333 is a 0.647-mile-long (1.041 km) supplemental road in Paintsville in central Johnson County. The highway begins at KY 321 Business (Broadway Street) just north of the business route's southern terminus at KY 321. KY 2333 heads east along Broadway Street to its eastern terminus at KY 1428 (Depot Road). The Kentucky Transportation Cabinet assigned KY 2333 to part of the old routing of KY 40 when that highway was relocated through Paintsville via a December 2, 1996, official order.

== KY 2336 ==
Kentucky Route 2336
- Location: Oak Ridge–Broadway
- Length: 3.522 mi (5.668 km)
- Existed: 1987–present

Kentucky Route 2336 is a 3.522-mile-long (5.668 km) rural secondary highway in northern Edmonson County. The highway begins at KY 728 (Nolin Dam Road) west of the namesake dam that impounds the Nolin River to form Nolin River Lake. KY 2336 passes to the west of the lake and the communities of Oak Ridge and Hillview. The highway continues northwest to its terminus at KY 259 in the village of Broadway. The Kentucky Transportation Cabinet established KY 2336 through an April 8, 1987, official order.

== KY 2377 ==
Kentucky Route 2377
- Location: Sand Spring–Pauline
- Length: 6.459 mi (10.395 km)
- Existed: 1987–present

Kentucky Route 2377 is a 6.459-mile-long (10.395 km) rural secondary highway in northern Logan County. The highway, which is named Anderson Store Road, begins at KY 106 (Quality Road) near Sand Spring. KY 2377 heads east across Dallam Creek, curves south, and curves east again at Old Quality Road. The highway crosses Duncan Creek and passes through the village of Anderson. KY 2377 crosses Muddy Creek, a tributary of the Green River to the north, before reaching its eastern terminus at KY 79 (Morgantown Road) near Pauline. The Kentucky Transportation Cabinet established KY 2377 through an April 8, 1987, official order.

== KY 2378 ==
Kentucky Route 2378
- Location: Paintsville
- Length: 0.125 mi (201 m)

Kentucky Route 2378 is a 0.125-mile-long (0.201 km) supplemental road in Paintsville in central Johnson County. The highway follows James S. Trimble Boulevard from KY 321 (Old Paintsville Bypass) across Paint Creek to the end of state maintenance west of West Street, where the road continues east as 2nd Street.
