= List of special routes in Kentucky =

A special Kentucky Route (neologistically a bannered Kentucky Route) is a special route of the system of the system of state highways in the Commonwealth of Kentucky.

Like the special U.S. routes, special state routes, as the name suggests, are typically marked with an auxiliary sign (or "banner") above (or occasionally below) the route shield, or a suffix letter after the number in the shield. In some cases, the name of the special route type was to be placed on the shield itself, most notably in the case of Kentucky Route 11 Business (KY 11 Bus.) and KY 32 Bus. in Flemingsburg, in Fleming County.

The list below includes the route numbers and locations which the special routes are located.

== KY 1–KY 100 ==
=== KY 3 ===
- KY 3 Spur: Louisa, Lawrence County

=== KY 8 ===
- KY 8 Conn.: Lewis County
- KY 8 Spur: South Portsmouth, Greenup County
- KY 8 Bus. Dayton-Bellevue-Newport, Campbell County

=== KY 11 ===
- KY 11 Bus.: Flemingsburg, Fleming County

=== KY 15 ===
- KY 15 Spur -- Campton, Wolfe County
- KY 15 Bus.: Hazard, Perry County
- KY 15 Conn.: Whitesburg, Letcher County
- KY 15 Bus.: Whitesburg, Letcher County

=== KY 17 ===
- KY 17 Bus.: Independence, Kenton County

=== KY 22 ===
- KY 22 Conn.: Metro Louisville/Jefferson County
- KY 22 Bus.: Williamstown, Grant County

=== KY 32 ===
- KY 32 Bus.: Flemingsburg, Fleming County
- KY 32 Conn.: Louisa, Lawrence County

=== KY 55 ===
- KY 55 Bus.: Columbia, Adair County
- KY 55 Spur: Lebanon, Marion County
- KY 55 Bus.: Shelbyville, Shelby County

=== KY 57 ===
- KY 57 Bus.: Flemingsburg, Fleming County

=== KY 61 ===
- KY 61 Conn.: Metro Louisville, Jefferson County
  - Also known as Harrison Street, connects KY 61 north with KY 61 south as KY 61 is split in this area.

=== KY 70 ===
- KY 70 Byp.: Cave City, Barren County
- KY 70 Bus.: Liberty, Casey County

=== KY 74 ===
- KY 74 Truck: Middlesboro, Bell County

=== KY 79 ===
- KY 79 Truck: Morgantown, Butler County

=== KY 80 ===
- KY 80 Bus.: Mayfield, Graves County
- KY 80 CONN: Somerset, Pulaski County
- KY 80 Bus.: Somerset, Pulaski County
- KY 80 Spur: Martin, Floyd County

=== KY 90 ===
- KY 90 Alt.: Glasgow, Barren County
- KY 90 Truck: Glasgow, Barren County
- KY 90 Bus.: Monticello, Wayne County
- KY 90 Spur: Cumberland Falls, Whitley County

=== KY 94 ===
- KY 94 Conn.: Fulton County (connects KY 94 with US 51)
- KY 94 Conn.: Calloway County (connects KY 94 with KY 80)
- KY 94 Spur: Calloway County

=== KY 100 ===
- KY 100 Truck: Franklin, Simpson County

== KY 101–KY 200 ==
=== KY 121 ===
- KY 121 Bus.: Mayfield, Graves County

=== KY 189 ===
- KY 189 Conn.: Powderly, Muhlenberg County

=== KY 194 ===
- KY 194 Conn.: Freeburn, Pike County
- KY 194 Spur: Freeburn, Pike County

== KY 201–KY 1000 ==
=== KY 329 ===
- KY 329 BYP: Crestwood, Oldham County

=== KY 439 ===
- KY 439 Conn.: Columbia, Adair County

=== KY 451 ===
- KY 451 Conn.: Hazard, Perry County

=== KY 480 ===
- KY 480 CONN: Shepherdsville, Bullitt County

=== KY 627 ===
- KY 627 Truck: Winchester, Clark County

=== KY 913 ===
- KY 913 Conn.: Metro Louisville/Jefferson County

== KY 1001–KY 6999 ==
=== KY 2034 ===
- KY 2034 Conn.: Ermine, Letcher County

=== KY 2107 ===
- KY 2107 Conn.: Cleaton, Muhlenberg County

=== KY 2295 ===
- KY 2295 Conn.: Somerset, Pulaski County

=== KY 2491 ===
- KY 2491 Conn.: Wolfe County

== See also ==
- List of state highways in Kentucky (1-999)
- List of state highways in Kentucky (1000-1999)
- List of state highways in Kentucky (2000-2999)
