= Kentucky Route 221 =

State highway in Kentucky, United States

Kentucky Route 221
- KY 221 highlighted in red

Route information
- Maintained by KYTC
- Length: 42.5 mi (68.4 km)

Major junctions
- West end: KY 66 east of Dorton Branch
- US 421 near Bledsoe; KY 510 in Pine Mountain
- East end: KY 699 southwest of Leatherwood

Location
- Country: United States
- State: Kentucky
- Counties: Bell, Harlan, Perry, Leslie

Highway system
- Kentucky State Highway System; Interstate; US; State; Parkways
← KY 220	→ KY 222

Kentucky Route 221 (KY 221) is a 42.5-mile-long (68.4 km) state highway in the U.S. state of Kentucky. The highway connects mostly rural areas of Bell, Harlan, Perry, and Leslie counties with the Daniel Boone National Forest.

== Route description ==
=== Bell County ===
KY 221 begins at an intersection with KY 66 east of Dorton Branch, within Bell. It travels in an easterly direction, paralleling the ironically named Straight Creek. In Jenson, it intersects the southern terminus of KY 2013. It curves to the northeast and crosses over Straight Creek. The highway immediately intersects the southern terminus of KY 1630 just outside of Kettle Island. It also crosses over some CSX railroad tracks and continues to the northeast. After crossing Mill Creek, it crosses over the CSX tracks again and enters Laurel Ford. There, it briefly heads to the north-northwest before resuming its northeast direction. In Stoney Fork, it crosses over Stoney Fork and intersects the southern terminus of KY 2011 (Stoney Fork Road).

=== Harlan County ===
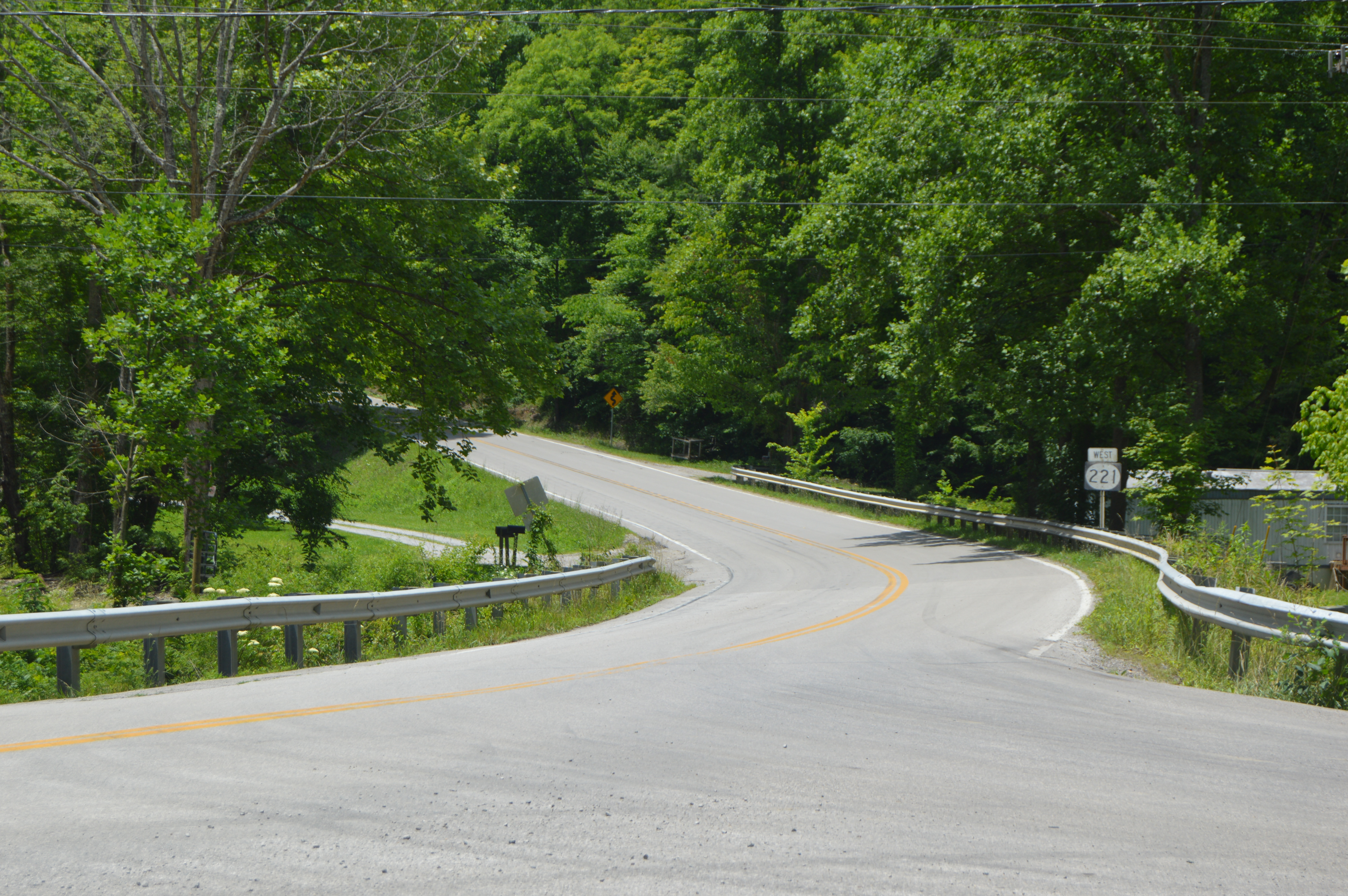
Typical scenery, at the KY 2009 intersection north of Harlan

After entering Harlan County, KY 221 enters Tacky Town. It crosses over Big Run and Laurel Branch and intersects the northern terminus of KY 3448. It begins to travel along the southern edge of the Boone Forestlands Wildlife Management Area. It has a crossing of Salt Trace Branch and an intersection with the southern terminus of KY 1780. The highway then curves to the east and crosses Straight Creek one final time before curving to the southeast and leaving the creek. It intersects the southern terminus of KY 3466 (Bigelow Road) and then passes Green Hills Elementary School. Right after that, it intersects U.S. Route 421 (US 421). The two highways travel concurrently in a northeasterly direction, along the southern edge of Daniel Boone National Forest. When they split, KY 221 enters the forest proper. It heads to the east, passing Green and Middleton Cemeteries. It resumes its northeastern direction, then crosses over Laurel Fork and intersects the southern terminus of KY 2009. It then intersects the southern terminus of KY 3465 (Abner Branch Road). In Divide, it intersects the northern terminus of KY 2010. In Pine Mountain, it curves to the north and intersects the western terminus of KY 510. KY 221 then heads to the north-northwest and parallels Greasy Creek, with one crossing of the creek. In Big Laurel, the highway crosses over Big Laurel Creek and intersects the eastern terminus of KY 2008. KY 221 then heads to the northeast, paralleling Big Laurel Creek. It then curves to the north and north-northwest and enters Perry County.

=== Perry and Leslie counties ===
KY 221 doesn't have any major intersections in Perry County. It curves to the southwest and enters Leslie County. It curves to the north and northeast and meets its eastern terminus, an intersection with KY 699 (Cutshin Road).

== Major intersections ==
County	Location	mi	km	Destinations	Notes
Bell		0.0	0.0	KY 66 – Pineville	Western terminus
Bell	Jenson	2.2	3.5	KY 2013 north	Southern terminus of KY 2013
Bell		4.2	6.8	KY 1630 north	Southern terminus of KY 1630
Bell	Stoney Fork	9.3	15.0	KY 2011 north (Stoney Fork Road)	Southern terminus of KY 2011
Harlan	Tacky Town	13.1	21.1	KY 3448 south	Northern terminus of KY 3448
Harlan	Boone Forestlands Wildlife Management Area	14.4	23.2	KY 1780 north	Southern terminus of KY 1780
Harlan		21.2	34.1	KY 3466 north (Bigelow Road)	Southern terminus of KY 3466
Harlan		21.5	34.6	US 421 south – Harlan	Western end of US 421 concurrency
Harlan	Daniel Boone National Forest	22.5	36.2	US 421 north – Hyden	Eastern end of US 421 concurrency
Harlan	Daniel Boone National Forest	25.0	40.2	KY 2009 north	Southern terminus of KY 2009
Harlan	Daniel Boone National Forest	28.6	46.0	KY 3465 north (Abner Branch Road)	Southern terminus of KY 3465
Harlan	Divide	30.1	48.4	KY 2010 south	Northern terminus of KY 2010
Harlan	Pine Mountain	32.0	51.5	KY 510 east	Western terminus of KY 510
Harlan	Big Laurel	35.1	56.5	KY 2008 west	Eastern terminus of KY 2008
Perry	No major junctions				
Leslie		42.5	68.4	KY 699 (Cutshin Road)	Eastern terminus
1.000 mi = 1.609 km; 1.000 km = 0.621 mi: Concurrency terminus
