= Tuckertown =

Tuckertown may refer to:

- Tuckertown, California, former name of Lakeport, California
- Tuckertown, Kentucky
- Tuckertown Reservoir

== See also ==
- Tuckerton, New Jersey
- Tucker's Town, Bermuda
