= John Shell Cabin =

- Shell, John, Cabin
- U.S. National Register of Historic Places
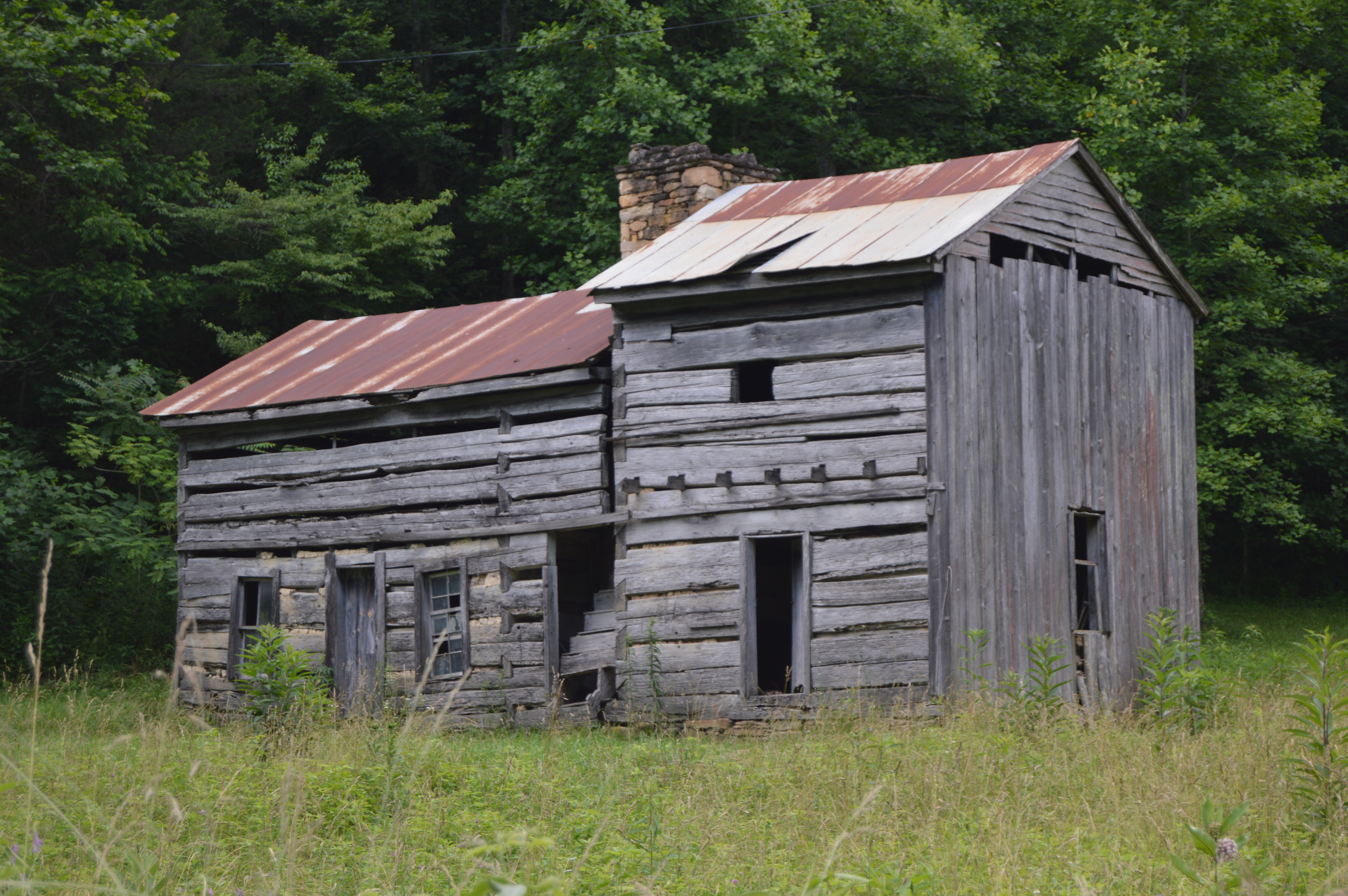

- Location within Kentucky Location within the United States
- Nearest city: Chappell, Kentucky
- Coordinates: 36°58′42″N 83°19′36″W
- Area: 1 acre (0.40 ha)
- Built: c.1850
- NRHP reference No.: 75000791
- Added to NRHP: November 12, 1975

The John Shell Cabin, in Leslie County, Kentucky, located south of Chappell, Kentucky on Greasy Creek Road (Kentucky Route 2009), was listed on the National Register of Historic Places in 1975.

It dates from c.1850. The listing included four contributing buildings.

It is on the side of Gray Mountain, just north of the Leslie-Harlan county line. It is located on the Shell Branch of the Laurel Fork of Greasy Creek. It is located about 15 miles approximately southeast of U.S. Highway 421.

It was home of rifle-maker John Shell.
