= Belton, Kentucky =

Unincorporated community in Kentucky, United States

- Unincorporated community
- Location within Kentucky Location within the United States
- Coordinates: 37°9′36″N 87°1′42″W
- Country: United States
- State: Kentucky
- County: Muhlenberg
- Elevation: 453 ft (138 m)
- Time zone: UTC-6 (Central (CST))
  - Summer (DST): UTC-5 (CST)
- ZIP codes: 42324
- Area code: 270
- GNIS feature ID: 507312

Belton is an unincorporated community located in Muhlenberg County, Kentucky, United States.

== History ==
Belton was formerly called Yost; the original name was in honor of a local family, and the present name is also local in origin, for the Bell family. A post office called Yost was established in 1883, and the name was changed to Belton in 1926.

== Geography ==
The community is located in the southeastern portion of Muhlenberg County at the junction of U.S. Route 431 and Kentucky Route 2270.
