= Hoskinston, Kentucky =

Unincorporated community in Kentucky, United States

- Unincorporated community
- Location in Kentucky Location in the United States
- Coordinates: 37°4′38″N 83°23′30″W
- Country: United States
- State: Kentucky
- County: Leslie
- Elevation: 935 ft (285 m)
- Time zone: UTC-5 (Eastern (EST))
  - Summer (DST): UTC-4 (EST)
- ZIP codes: 40844
- GNIS feature ID: 512809

Hoskinston is an unincorporated community in Leslie County, Kentucky, United States.

A post office was established in 1887 and named for is first postmaster, Carlo Hoskins.
