= Pathfork, Kentucky =

Unincorporated community in Kentucky, United States

- Census-designated place
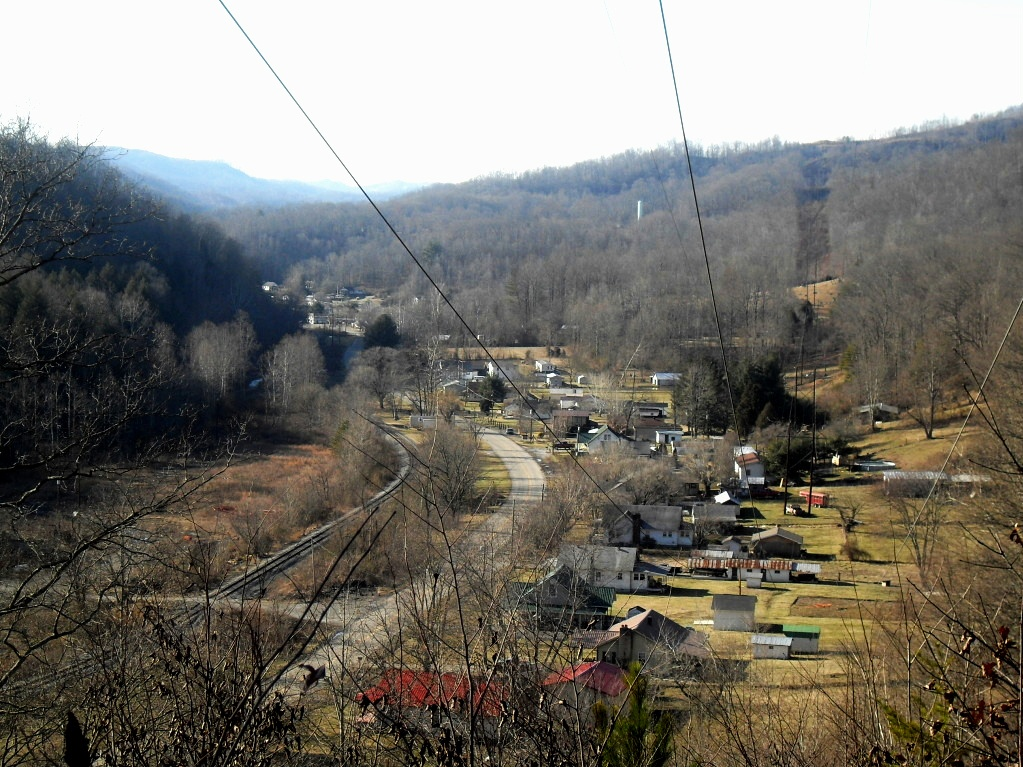
- View of eastern Pathfork above one of the mountains

- Location within Kentucky Location within the United States
- Coordinates: 36°45′21″N 83°27′53″W
- Country: United States
- State: Kentucky
- County: Harlan

Area
  - Total: 1.25 sq mi (3.24 km^{2})
  - Land: 1.24 sq mi (3.22 km^{2})
  - Water: 0.012 sq mi (0.03 km^{2})
- Elevation: 1,240 ft (380 m)

Population (2020)
  - Total: 326
  - Density: 262.3/sq mi (101.26/km^{2})
- Time zone: UTC-5 (Eastern (EST))
  - Summer (DST): UTC-4 (EDT)
- ZIP code: 40863
- Area code: 606
- GNIS feature ID: 489796

Pathfork is an unincorporated community and census-designated place (CDP) in Harlan County, Kentucky, United States, located to the south bank of Wallins Creek. As of the 2020 census, Pathfork had a population of 326. The community's main roads are East Hwy 72, which connects from US 119, and travels to an end at Old RB Mines, however, 72 runs to Harlan via gravel road, and Ky 2005 an old gravel road that leads to Smith/Brownies Creek, south of Harlan, Kentucky.

== Demographics ==
Historical population
| Census | Pop. | Note | %± |
|---|---|---|---|
| 2020 | 326 | | — |
U.S. Decennial Census

== Overview ==
The community used to rely heavily on coal mining, but the coal industry in Pathfork has faced significant challenges in recent years due to the increasing use of natural gas and renewable energy sources. A small community park, known as Coal Miner's Memorial Park, was created to honor the community's ties to coal mining.

There are four churches in the community: Insull Holiness, Pathfork Holiness Church, Pathfork Baptist, and Blackstar Pentecostal Church.
