= Kentucky Route 2860 =

State highway in Kentucky, United States

Kentucky Route 2860
- Grinstead Drive
- KY 2860 highlighted in red

Route information
- Maintained by KYTC
- Length: 0.981 mi (1,579 m)
- Existed: 1984–present

Major junctions
- West end: US 31E / US 150 in Louisville
- East end: US 60 Alt. in Louisville

Location
- Country: United States
- State: Kentucky
- Counties: Jefferson

Highway system
- Kentucky State Highway System; Interstate; US; State; Parkways
← KY 2859	→ KY 2861

Kentucky Route 2860 (KY 2860) is a state highway in the city of Louisville in Kentucky. The highway runs 0.981 miles (1.579 km) along Grinstead Drive from U.S. Route 31E and US 150 east to US 60 Alt. KY 2860 was established in 1984.

== Route description ==
KY 2860 begins at US 31E and US 150, which concurrently follow Bardstown Road, in The Highlands area of the city of Louisville. Grinstead Drive continues west as a municipally maintained street one block to KY 1703 (Baxter Avenue). KY 2860 follows Grinstead Drive east between the Cherokee Triangle neighborhood to the south and Cave Hill Cemetery to the north. The highway passes Louisville Collegiate School before reaching its eastern terminus at US 60 Alt. on the western edge of Cherokee Park. The alternate route follows Cherokee Parkway west of the intersection and Grinstead Drive to the east. The Kentucky Transportation Cabinet classifies KY 2860 as a state secondary highway.

== History ==
The Kentucky Transportation Cabinet established KY 2860 through a September 10, 1984, official order that also changed the routings of US 60 and US 60 Alt. and eliminated US 60 Bus., and US 60 Truck. KY 2860 replaced the part of US 60 Bus. along the state route's current course. The transportation agency upgraded KY 2860 from a supplemental road to a state secondary highway via a November 18, 2004, official order.

== Major intersections ==
The entire route is in Louisville, Jefferson County.

mi	km	Destinations	Notes
0.000	0.000	US 31E / US 150 (Bardstown Road) / Grinstead Drive west	Western terminus
0.981	1.579	US 60 Alt. (Cherokee Parkway/Grinstead Drive)	Eastern terminus
1.000 mi = 1.609 km; 1.000 km = 0.621 mi
