= Peoples, Kentucky =

Unincorporated community in Kentucky, United States

- Unincorporated community
- Location within Kentucky Location within the United States
- Coordinates: 37°17′22″N 84°03′12″W
- Country: United States
- State: Kentucky
- County: Jackson
- Elevation: 971 ft (296 m)
- Time zone: UTC-5 (Eastern (EST))
  - Summer (DST): UTC-4 (EDT)
- Area code: 606
- GNIS feature ID: 514489

Peoples is an unincorporated community in Jackson County, Kentucky, United States. Peoples is located at the junction of Kentucky Route 2002 and Kentucky Route 3630 5 miles (8.0 km) west-southwest of Annville. Peoples had a post office until it closed on January 3, 2004. The community has the name of the local Peoples family.
