= Parrot, Kentucky =

Unincorporated community in Kentucky, United States

- Unincorporated community
- Location within Kentucky Location within the United States
- Coordinates: 37°19′09″N 84°03′31″W
- Country: United States
- State: Kentucky
- County: Jackson
- Elevation: 1,286 ft (392 m)
- Time zone: UTC-5 (Eastern (EST))
  - Summer (DST): UTC-4 (EDT)
- Area code: 606
- GNIS feature ID: 514445

Parrot is an unincorporated community in Jackson County, Kentucky, United States. Parrot is located at the junction of Kentucky Route 2002 and Kentucky Route 2003 4.85 miles (7.81 km) west of Annville. Parrot had a post office which opened on September 7, 1898, and closed on July 23, 1994. The community was named for a local family; it has also been called Letter Box, as before the post office opened residents used a letter box attached to a tree for mail service.
