= Dabolt, Kentucky =

Unincorporated community in Kentucky, United States

- Unincorporated community
- Location within Kentucky Location within the United States
- Coordinates: 37°20′17″N 84°1′36″W
- Country: United States
- State: Kentucky
- County: Jackson
- Elevation: 1,286 ft (392 m)
- Time zone: UTC-5 (Central (EST))
  - Summer (DST): UTC-4 (EDT)
- ZIP code: 40402
- Area code: 606
- GNIS feature ID

Dabolt is an unincorporated community in Jackson County, Kentucky, United States.

A post office was established in the community in 1928. This post office was closed on January 3, 2004. Dabolt was named for Frederick P. Dabolt, a head of Foley Lumber Co.
