= Thixton, Louisville =

Neighborhood in Louisville, Kentucky

Coordinates: 38°06′01″N 85°33′59″W

Thixton is a neighborhood of Louisville, Kentucky centered along Bardstown Road and Thixton Lane.
