= Dunbar, Kentucky =

Unincorporated community in Kentucky, United States

- Unincorporated community
- Location within Kentucky Location within the United States
- Coordinates: 37°11′17″N 86°45′25″W
- Country: United States
- State: Kentucky
- County: Butler
- Elevation: 463 ft (141 m)
- Time zone: UTC-6 (Central (CST))
  - Summer (DST): UTC-5 (CDT)
- ZIP code: 42219
- Area codes: 270 & 364
- GNIS feature ID: 507887

Dunbar is an unincorporated community in Butler County, Kentucky, United States.

== History ==
The name of the community is a blend of those of two local families: the Dunns and the Barrows.

== Geography ==
The community is located in west-central Butler County along Kentucky Route 70 (KY 70) near its junction with KY 1117 about 4.8 miles (7.7 km) west-southwest of Morgantown. It is also directly served by the Exit 27 interchange of Interstate 165 on the west side of Morgantown.

== Post office ==
Dunbar had a post office with ZIP code 42219. The post office operated from its establishment on April 19, 1898, until its closing on May 13, 2022.

== Points of interest ==
Dunbar is home to the Cedar Ridge Speedway.
