= Tejay, Kentucky =

Unincorporated community in Kentucky, United States

Tejay
- Unincorporated community
- Location within the state of Kentucky Tejay (the United States)
- Coordinates: 36°45′49″N 83°33′44″W
- Country: United States
- State: Kentucky
- County: Bell
- Elevation: 1,063 ft (324 m)
- Time zone: UTC-5 (Eastern (EST))
  - Summer (DST): UTC-4 (EDT)
- GNIS feature ID: 509194

Tejay is an unincorporated community located in Bell County, Kentucky, United States. It was named for Thomas Jefferson Asher (1848–1935), landowner and founder.
