= Sandgap, Kentucky =

Unincorporated community in Kentucky, United States

Sand Gap, Kentucky
- Unincorporated community
- The community's post office

- Location within Kentucky Location within the United States
- Coordinates: 37°29′10″N 84°05′26″W
- Country: United States
- State: Kentucky
- County: Jackson
- Elevation: 1,453 ft (443 m)
- Time zone: UTC-5 (Eastern (EST))
  - Summer (DST): UTC-4 (EDT)
- ZIP codes: 40481
- Area code: 606
- GNIS feature ID: 515235

Sand Gap is a small, unincorporated community in northwestern Jackson County, KY. It is located along U.S. Route 421, at its junction with KY Route 2004. Sand Gap Elementary School (K-5) is located in the community and is operated by the Jackson County Public School system. The community offers a few services such as a post office, grocery store, bank, public park, restaurant, gas station, and multiple churches
