= Ennis, Kentucky =

Unincorporated community in Kentucky, United States

- Unincorporated community
- Location within Kentucky Location within the United States
- Coordinates: 37°11′54″N 86°58′27″W
- Country: United States
- State: Kentucky
- County: Muhlenberg
- Elevation: 456 ft (139 m)
- Time zone: UTC-6 (Central (CST))
  - Summer (DST): UTC-5 (CST)
- GNIS feature ID: 507942

Ennis is an unincorporated community located in Muhlenberg County, Kentucky, United States.
