= Stoney Fork, Kentucky =

Unincorporated community in Kentucky, United States

- Unincorporated community
- Location within Kentucky
- Coordinates: 36°49′56″N 83°32′05″W
- Country: United States
- State: Kentucky
- County: Bell
- Elevation: 1,112 ft (339 m)
- Time zone: UTC-5 (Eastern (EST))
  - Summer (DST): UTC-4 (EDT)
- ZIP code: 40988
- Area code: 606
- GNIS feature ID: 504491

Stoney Fork is an unincorporated community in Bell County, Kentucky, United States. Stoney Fork is located on Kentucky Route 221 10.1 miles (16.3 km) east-northeast of Pineville. Stoney Fork has a post office with ZIP code 40988, which opened on November 20, 1946.
