= Coldiron, Kentucky =

Unincorporated community in Kentucky, United States

- Census-designated place
- Location within Kentucky Location within the United States
- Coordinates: 36°49′36″N 83°27′13″W
- Country: United States
- State: Kentucky
- County: Harlan

Area
  - Total: 0.24 sq mi (0.63 km^{2})
  - Land: 0.22 sq mi (0.57 km^{2})
  - Water: 0.027 sq mi (0.07 km^{2})
- Elevation: 1,132 ft (345 m)

Population (2020)
  - Total: 222
  - Density: 1,017.3/sq mi (392.78/km^{2})
- Time zone: UTC-5 (Eastern (EST))
  - Summer (DST): UTC-4 (EDT)
- ZIP code: 40819
- Area code: 606
- GNIS feature ID: 489796

Coldiron is a census-designated place and unincorporated community in Harlan County, Kentucky, United States. Its population was 222 as of the 2020 census.

== Demographics ==
Historical population
Census	Pop.	Note	%±
2010	223		—
2020	222		−0.4%
U.S. Decennial Census
