= Leetown, Kentucky =

Unincorporated community in Kentucky, United States

- Unincorporated community
- Location within Kentucky
- Coordinates: 37°08′22″N 86°44′34″W
- Country: United States
- State: Kentucky
- County: Butler
- Elevation: 600 ft (180 m)
- Time zone: UTC-6 (Central (CST))
  - Summer (DST): UTC-5 (CDT)
- Area code: 270
- GNIS feature ID: 508440

Leetown is an unincorporated community in Butler County, Kentucky, United States.
