= Lejunior, Kentucky =

Unincorporated community in Kentucky

- Unincorporated community
- Location within Kentucky Location within the United States
- Coordinates: 36°54′04″N 83°08′03″W
- Country: United States
- State: Kentucky
- County: Harlan
- Elevation: 1,394 ft (425 m)
- Time zone: UTC-5 (Eastern (EST))
  - Summer (DST): UTC-4 (EDT)
- ZIP code: 40849
- Area code: 606
- GNIS feature ID: 512274

Lejunior (also known as Gano) is an unincorporated community in Harlan County, Kentucky, United States. The community is located along Kentucky Route 38 and the Cumberland River 4.3 miles (6.9 km) northeast of Evarts. Lejunior has a post office with ZIP code 40849.
