= Coral Hill, Kentucky =

Unincorporated community in Kentucky, United States

Coral Hill
- Unincorporated community
- Location within the state of Kentucky Coral Hill (the United States)
- Coordinates: 37°03′05″N 85°51′23″W
- Country: United States
- State: Kentucky
- County: Barren
- Elevation: 846 ft (258 m)
- Time zone: UTC−6 (CST)
  - Summer (DST): UTC−5 (CDT)
- ZIP codes: 42141
- GNIS feature ID: 507756

Coral Hill is a rural unincorporated community in northeast Barren County, Kentucky, United States. It is named for a "great outcrop of coralline formation". Coral Hill had a post office from 1858 to 1907.
