= Kettle Island, Kentucky =

Unincorporated community in Kentucky, United States

- Unincorporated community
- Location within Kentucky
- Coordinates: 36°47′26″N 83°36′19″W
- Country: United States
- State: Kentucky
- County: Bell
- Elevation: 1,122 ft (342 m)
- Time zone: UTC-5 (Eastern (EST))
  - Summer (DST): UTC-4 (EDT)
- ZIP code: 40958
- Area code: 606
- GNIS feature ID: 495702

Kettle Island is an unincorporated community and coal town in Bell County, Kentucky, United States. Kettle Island is located on Kentucky Route 1630 near Kentucky Route 221, 5.35 miles (8.61 km) east-northeast of Pineville. Kettle Island has a post office with ZIP code 40958, which opened on March 15, 1912. The community also had a station on the Louisville and Nashville Railroad.

There are two possible explanations for the community's name. The first is that early settlers did laundry in a common kettle on an island in Straight Creek. The second is that hunters used an iron kettle on the same island as a landmark.

In 1930, an explosion at the Pioneer Mine in Kettle Island killed 16 miners.
