= Railton, Kentucky =

Unincorporated community in Kentucky, United States

Railton
- Unincorporated community
- Location within the state of Kentucky Railton (the United States)
- Coordinates: 36°58′54″N 86°07′14″W
- Country: United States
- State: Kentucky
- County: Barren
- Elevation: 758 ft (231 m)
- Time zone: UTC−6 (CST)
  - Summer (DST): UTC−5 (CDT)
- ZIP codes: 42171
- GNIS feature ID: 501530

Railton is a rural unincorporated community in western Barren County, Kentucky, United States. Railton had a post office from 1901 to 1908.
