= Dexterville, Kentucky =

Unincorporated community in Kentucky, United States

- Unincorporated community
- Location within Kentucky
- Coordinates: 37°19′03″N 86°39′22″W
- Country: United States
- State: Kentucky
- County: Butler
- Elevation: 427 ft (130 m)
- Time zone: UTC-6 (Central (CST))
  - Summer (DST): UTC-5 (CDT)
- Area codes: 270 and 364
- GNIS feature ID: 507852

Dexterville is an unincorporated community in Butler County, Kentucky, United States.
