= Merry Oaks, Kentucky =

Unincorporated community in Kentucky, United States

Merry Oaks
- Unincorporated community
- Location within the state of Kentucky Merry Oaks (the United States)
- Coordinates: 37°01′20″N 86°06′22″W
- Country: United States
- State: Kentucky
- County: Barren
- Elevation: 682 ft (208 m)
- Time zone: UTC−6 (CST)
  - Summer (DST): UTC−5 (CDT)
- ZIP codes: 42171
- GNIS feature ID: 508594

Merry Oaks is a rural unincorporated community in northwest Barren County, Kentucky, United States. Named for local oak trees, horse races were once held there. Merry Oaks had a post office from 1836 until 1904.
