= Wallins Creek, Kentucky =

Census-designated place in Kentucky, United States

- Census-designated place
- Location of Wallins Creek in Harlan County, Kentucky.
- Coordinates: 36°49′41″N 83°24′52″W
- Country: United States
- State: Kentucky
- County: Harlan

Area
  - Total: 0.56 sq mi (1.44 km^{2})
  - Land: 0.53 sq mi (1.37 km^{2})
  - Water: 0.027 sq mi (0.07 km^{2})
- Elevation: 1,135 ft (346 m)

Population (2020)
  - Total: 212
  - Density: 400/sq mi (154.3/km^{2})
- Time zone: UTC-5 (Eastern (EST))
  - Summer (DST): UTC-4 (EDT)
- ZIP code: 40873
- Area code: 606
- FIPS code: 21-80310
- GNIS feature ID: 0506153

Wallins Creek is an unincorporated community and census-designated place (CDP) in Harlan County, Kentucky, United States. As of the 2020 census, Wallins Creek had a population of 212.

== History ==
Wallins Creek began life as a coal mining town in 1925; the mine was owned by the Wallins Creek Coal Corporation. The Wallins Creek Baptist Church was established in 1855 with 30 members.

Wallins Creek is home to the Wallins Elementary School, which has been in use since the 1940s and has won several awards in sports and academics.

== Geography ==
Wallins Creek is in western Harlan County, in the valley of the Cumberland River. U.S. Route 119 runs through the northern part of the community, leading northwest (upriver) 8 miles (13 km) to Harlan, the county seat, and southwest 23 miles (37 km) to Pineville.

According to the United States Census Bureau, in 2010 the city had a total area of 0.33 square miles (0.86 km^{2}), of which 0.02 square miles (0.05 km^{2}), or 5.31%, were water.

== Demographics ==
Historical population
Census	Pop.	Note	%±
1930	900		—
1940	903		0.3%
1950	525		−41.9%
1960	468		−10.9%
1970	369		−21.2%
1980	459		24.4%
1990	261		−43.1%
2000	257		−1.5%
2010	156		−39.3%
2020	212		35.9%
U.S. Decennial Census

As of the census of 2000, there were 257 people, 112 households, and 73 families residing in the city. The population density was 657.8 inhabitants per square mile (254.0/km^{2}). There were 126 housing units at an average density of 322.5 units per square mile (124.5 units/km^{2}). The racial makeup of the city was 97.28% White, 0.39% Native American, and 2.33% from two or more races.

There were 112 households, out of which 25.0% had children under the age of 18 living with them, 47.3% were married couples living together, 16.1% had a female householder with no husband present, and 34.8% were non-families. 29.5% of all households were made up of individuals, and 14.3% had someone living alone who was 65 years of age or older. The average household size was 2.29 and the average family size was 2.86.

In the city, the population was spread out, with 23.7% under the age of 18, 3.5% from 18 to 24, 26.8% from 25 to 44, 28.8% from 45 to 64, and 17.1% who were 65 years of age or older. The median age was 42 years. For every 100 females, there were 94.7 males. For every 100 females age 18 and over, there were 90.3 males.

The median income for a household in the city was $11,083, and the median income for a family was $16,563. Males had a median income of $17,500 versus $20,625 for females. The per capita income for the city was $8,151. About 47.6% of families and 44.2% of the population were below the poverty line, including 46.9% of those under the age of eighteen and 14.6% of those 65 or over.
