= Big Laurel, Kentucky =

Unincorporated community in Kentucky, United States

- Unincorporated community
- Location within Kentucky Location within the United States
- Coordinates: 36°58′47″N 83°13′2″W
- Country: United States
- State: Kentucky
- County: Harlan
- Elevation: 1,335 ft (407 m)
- Time zone: UTC-5 (Eastern (EST))
  - Summer (DST): UTC-4 (EST)
- ZIP codes: 40808
- GNIS feature ID: 510669

Big Laurel is an unincorporated community in Harlan County, Kentucky, United States.
