= Tuckertown, Kentucky =

Unincorporated community in Kentucky, United States

Tuckertown
- Unincorporated community
- Location within the state of Kentucky Tuckertown (the United States)
- Coordinates: 37°4′35″N 86°15′41″W
- Country: United States
- State: Kentucky
- County: Warren
- Elevation: 564 ft (172 m)
- Time zone: UTC-6 (Central (CST))
  - Summer (DST): UTC-5 (CST)
- GNIS feature ID: 509241

Tuckertown is an unincorporated community in Warren County, Kentucky, United States.
