= Chappell, Kentucky =

Unincorporated community in Kentucky, United States

- Unincorporated community
- Location in Kentucky Location in the United States
- Coordinates: 37°00′39″N 83°21′00″W
- Country: United States
- State: Kentucky
- County: Leslie
- Elevation: 1,033 ft (315 m)
- Time zone: UTC-5 (Eastern (EST))
  - Summer (DST): UTC-4 (EST)
- ZIP codes: 40816
- GNIS feature ID: 511316

Chappell is an unincorporated community in Leslie County, Kentucky, United States.
