= Bledsoe, Kentucky =

Unincorporated community in Kentucky, United States

- Unincorporated community
- Location within Kentucky Location within the United States
- Coordinates: 36°55′25″N 83°22′1″W
- Country: United States
- State: Kentucky
- County: Harlan
- Elevation: 1,417 ft (432 m)
- Time zone: UTC-6 (Eastern)
  - Summer (DST): UTC-5 (Est)
- ZIP codes: 40810
- GNIS feature ID: 510783

Bledsoe is an unincorporated community in Harlan County, Kentucky, United States. The Bledsoe post office was in service from 1900 to 1918.
