= Pine Mountain, Kentucky =

Unincorporated community in Kentucky, United States

- Unincorporated community
- Location within Kentucky Location within the United States
- Coordinates: 36°56′55″N 83°10′56″W
- Country: United States
- State: Kentucky
- County: Harlan
- Elevation: 1,745 ft (532 m)
- Time zone: UTC-5 (Eastern (EST))
  - Summer (DST): UTC-4 (EDT)
- GNIS feature ID: 514594

Pine Mountain is an unincorporated community in Harlan County, Kentucky, United States. It is known as the home of the Pine Mountain Settlement School. A century ago, Pine Mountain was the home of skilled and fluent folk singers, who remembered and sang the songs of their ancestors, handed down through generations. Many of their songs were preserved for posterity by visiting fieldworkers, including Lorraine Wyman and Cecil Sharp, who used the Settlement School as a base.

Pine Mountain once had a post office but it is now closed.
