= William Creech Sr. =

American philanthropist (d.1845–1918)

- Born: c. 1845; Harlan County, Kentucky
- Died: 1918
- Occupation: philanthropist

William Creech Sr. (c. 1845–1918) was an American philanthropist. "Uncle" William Creech is remembered for his contributions to improve Harlan County, Kentucky.

== Philanthropic efforts ==
=== Pine Mountain Settlement School ===
Uncle William Creech donated 700 acres (2.8 km^{2}) of land to establish Pine Mountain Settlement School, the first educational institution in the area. The school was co-founded in 1913 by Katherine Pettit and Ethel de Long Zande and was designed by architect Mary Rockwell Hook. Ethel's husband Luigi Zande, who was an Italian stonemason and educator, helped to design and build many buildings on the schools campus, including the stone reservoir and chapel. Pine Mountain Settlement School has served many purposes, though its current foci are Appalachian cultural education and environmental education.

As Creech said in a letter from 1915,

I have heart and cravin' that our people may grow better. I have deeded my land to the Pine Mountain Settlement School to be used for school purposes as long as the Constitution of the United States stands. Hoping it may make bright and intelligent people after I'm dead and gone.

=== Gaining a post office ===
According to Ben Lucien Burman in Children of Noah: Glimpses of Unknown America,

In any rural community the mail is always a matter of importance, particularly in a region so isolated as the Cumberlands. Uncle William had decided that Pine Mountain's crying need was a post office."

Creech's efforts to gain a local post office were a struggle because his rural area would not be allowed to have its own post office until it was deemed able to support enough postal business. To stimulate mail delivery, Creech worked with often illiterate residents to request mail-order catalogs. Following his initial efforts with a more personal campaign, Creech helped residents write letters to their sons, husbands, and boyfriends who were fighting in World War I. Although often requiring the help of literate friends, many soldiers responded with letters home.

Creech's labor was successful. The United States Postal Service was impressed by the quantity of mail, and a post office was established in the area.
