= Zande (surname) =

Zande is a surname, and may refer to:

- Ethel de Long Zande (1879–1928), American educator
- Jeff Vande Zande, American writer and poet
- Luigi Zande (1887–1957), Italian-American stonemason and educator

== See also ==
- Van der Zande
- Zander (surname)
- Sande (surname)
