= Zander (surname) =

Zander is a surname, and may refer to:

- Adolf Zander (1843–1914), German musician and choir director
- Albert Zander (1864–1897), German photographer
- Arnold Zander (1901–1975), American labor union leader
- Benjamin Zander (born 1939), English conductor
- Carl Zander (born 1963), American football player
- Christian Zander (born 1978), German politician
- Christine Zander, American television writer and producer
- Clarice Zander (1893–1958), Australian art curator
- Dane Zander (born 1999), Australian rugby union footballer
- Dietrich Zander (born 1951), German rower
- Dirk Zander (born 1965), German footballer and coach
- Edward Zander (born 1947), American business executive
- Enoch Zander (1873–1957), German entomologist
- Erich Zander (1905–1991), German field hockey player
- Erich Zander (art director) (1889–1965), German art director
- Frank Zander (born 1942), German singer and actor
- Friedrich Zander (1887–1933), Russian engineer
- Gustav Zander (1835–1920), Swedish physician and orthopedist
- Heinz Zander (1939–2024), German author and illustrator
- Heinz Zander (water polo) (born 1923), German water polo player
- Hermann Zander (1912–1973), German rower
- Holger Zander (born 1943), German canoeist
- Jack Zander (1908–2007), American animator
- Jack Zander (footballer) (1910–2002), Australian rules footballer
- Joakim Zander (born 1975), Swedish author and lawyer
- John Zander (1890–1967), Swedish middle-distance runner
- Jörg Zander (born 1964), German Formula One car designer
- Judith Zander (born 1980), German poet and translator
- Klaus Zander (born 1956), German basketball player
- Luca Zander (born 1995), German footballer
- Martin Zander (1882–1925), German World War I flying ace
- Michael Zander (born 1932), English legal scholar
- Nina Zander (born 1990), German tennis player
- Peter Zander (actor) (1922–2019), German-born British actor
- Peter Zander (politician) (1832–1884), American politician from Wisconsin
- Richard Zander (born 1964), German former competitive figure skater
- Richard Zander (anatomist) (1855–1918), German anatomist
- Robert Zander (1895–1966), Swedish footballer
- Robin Zander (born 1953), American singer and guitarist
- Rudolph Zander (1915–1996), Canadian politician from Alberta
- Solveig Zander (born 1955), Swedish politician
- Thomas Zander (footballer) (born 1951), German footballer
- Thomas Zander (wrestler) (born 1967), German amateur wrestler
- Thorsten O. Zander (born 1975), German cognitive scientist
- Udo Zander (born 1959), Swedish business theorist
- Walter Zander (1898–1993), German lawyer, scholar and writer
- Wilhelm Zander (1911–1974), German SS officer
- William Zander (1844–1919), American politician from Wisconsin

== See also ==
- Zande (surname)
- Sander (surname)
