= Kingdom Come Settlement School =

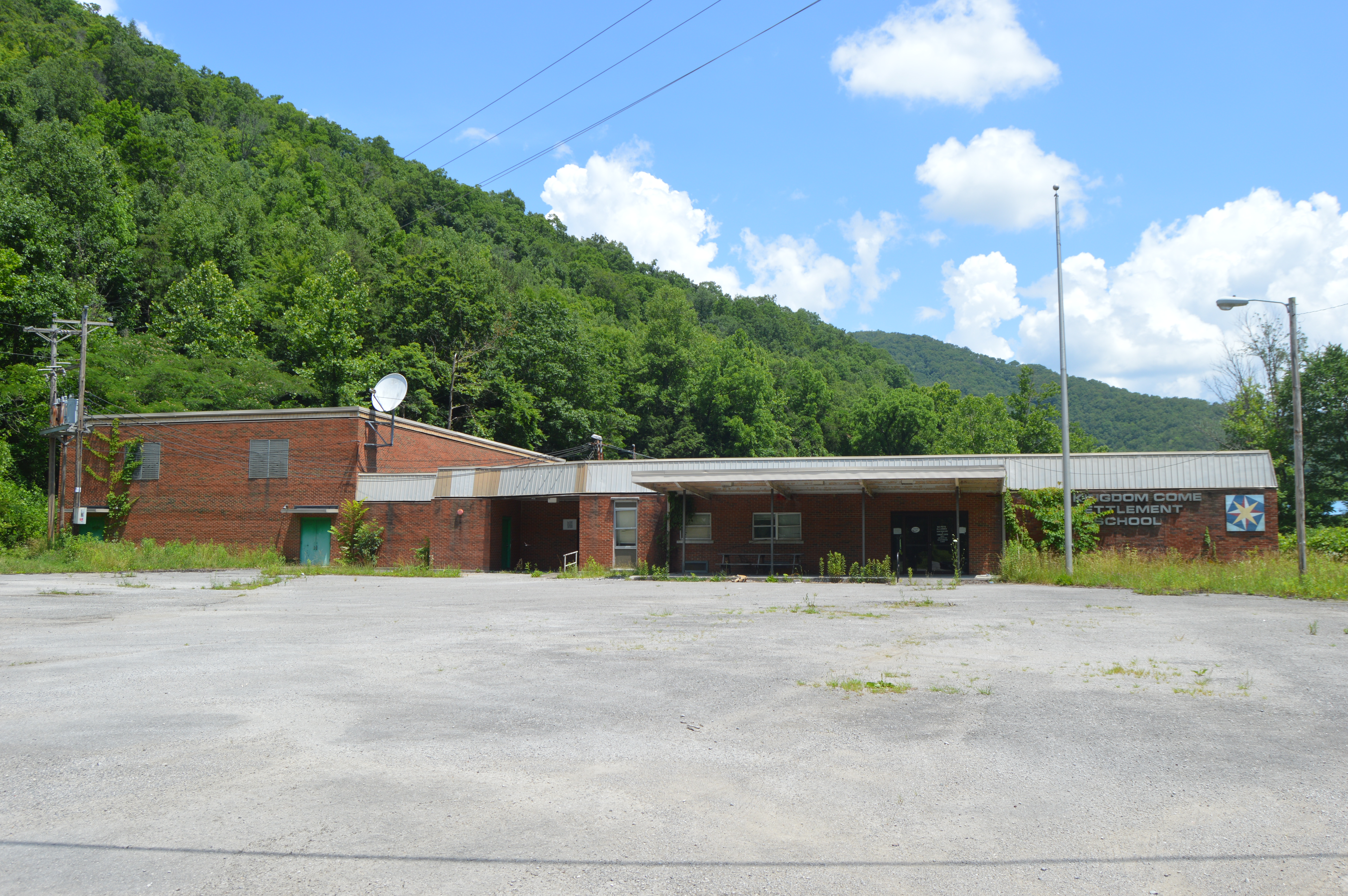
- The school's final building, located on Kentucky Route 160 in Linefork
- 16040 Kentucky Route 160; Linefork, Kentucky 41833; United States

Information
- Type: Settlement school
- Religious affiliation: Methodist
- Closed: 1968
- Colors: Green and white
- Teams: Wildcats

Kingdom Come Settlement School in Linefork, Letcher County, Kentucky, was a settlement school founded as a Methodist mission in 1924.

As of fall 1942, the school enrolled 76 high school students and 65 grade-school students. Samuel Quigley was the principal.

Kingdom Come School had an associated settlement house. As of 1942, two of the school's women teachers, C. Lois Rea, and Ruth Lamdin, lived in the settlement house to conduct community programs and religious activities. Rea had earlier been a missionary in Malaya and was evacuated from Singapore shortly before it fell to the Japanese during World War II, and Lambdin had previously been at Henderson Settlement School, another Methodist project,
