= May Stone =

May Stone may refer to:

- May Stone (Home and Away), soap opera character
- May Stone (educator) (1867–1946), American educator and administrator
