= Settlement school =

Social reform institutions in the United States

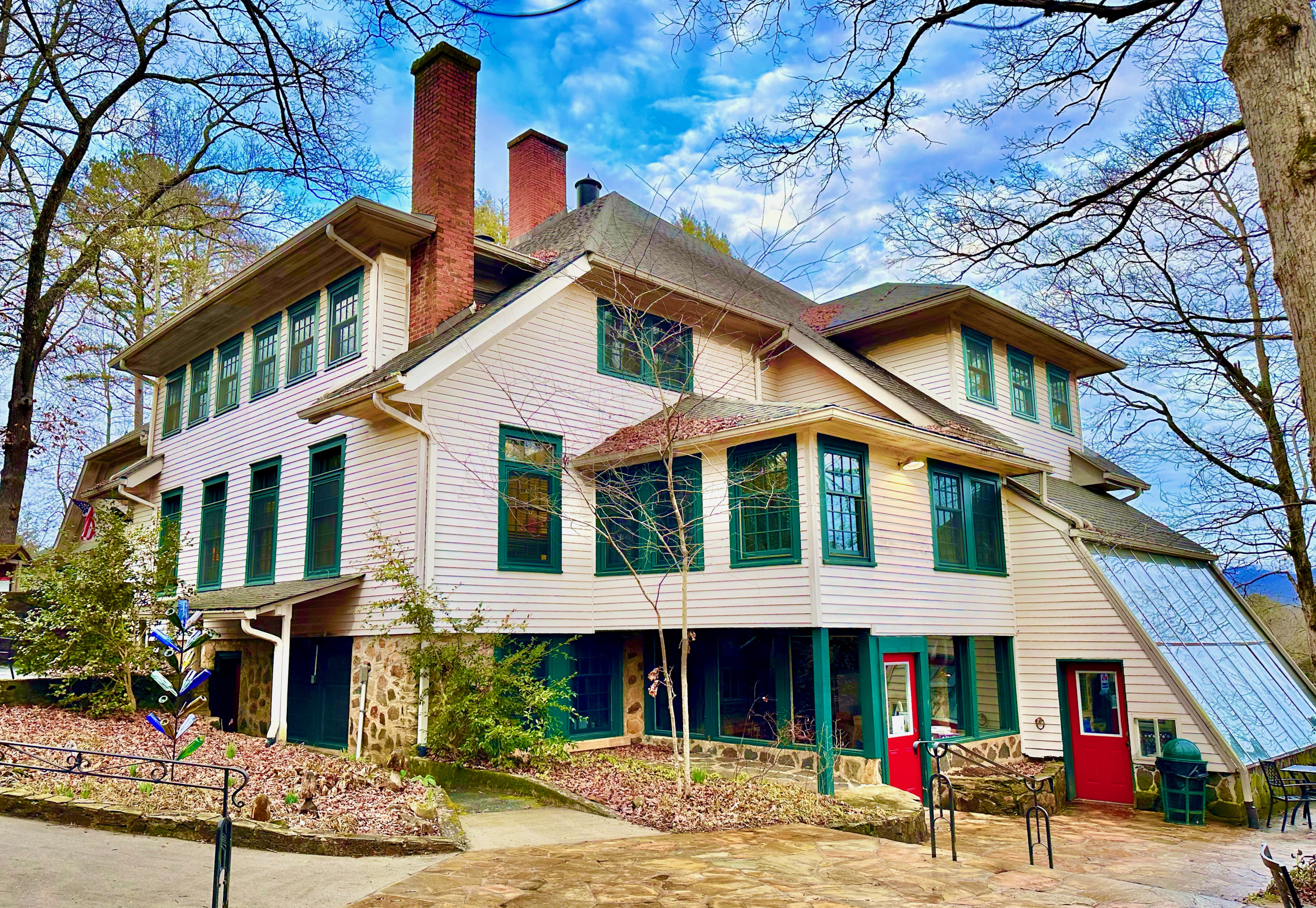
The John C. Campbell Folk School is in Brasstown, North Carolina

Settlement schools are social reform institutions established in rural Appalachia in the early 20th century with the purpose of educating mountain children and improving their isolated rural communities.

Settlement schools have played an important role in preserving and promoting the cultural heritage of southern and central Appalachia. Scholar David Whisnant has argued that settlement schools created a version of "traditional" Appalachian culture that appealed to outsiders but had little basis in the values of Appalachian people themselves.

== History ==
The Appalachian settlement schools were inspired by the settlement movement that started in London in the late 19th century and was represented in the United States by urban settlement houses, including Hull House in Chicago and the Henry Street Settlement in New York City. A large fraction of settlement schools were founded as Christian missions and had a religious purpose in addition to a social welfare purpose.

Possibly the earliest manifestation of the settlement movement in southern Appalachia was the Log Cabin Settlement near Asheville, North Carolina, started in September 1894 by Susan Chester. Chester, a graduate of Vassar College, had experience with urban settlements in the northeastern United States. She considered the people of rural Appalachia to be "the purest Americans to be found" and envisioned her Log Cabin Settlement as an opportunity to "revive the weaving industry... and provide a good library for the community" in cooperation with a mission chapel and district school.

Hindman Settlement School, in Hindman, Kentucky, is considered the first rural social settlement school in the United States, established in 1902 by May Stone and Katherine Pettit at the forks of Troublesome Creek in Knott County, Kentucky.

The women's fraternity Pi Beta Phi opened the Pi Beta Phi Settlement School in Gatlinburg, Tennessee, in 1912 to provide education, economic opportunity, and health care to the rural area at the edge of the Great Smoky Mountains. The school also conducted arts and crafts classes in an effort to preserve and promote the region's crafts tradition.

Pine Mountain Settlement School, in Harlan County, Kentucky, was founded by William Creech, Sr., in 1913. Creech, a local resident, donated land for the school and recruited Katherine Pettit and Ethel DeLong to establish and run the institution.

Settlement schools typically had large campuses, including dormitories for boarding students. They functioned not only as schools, but also as community centers.

With the establishment of public schools in the region in the 1920s and 1930s, settlement schools relinquished their role in the general education of children. Pine Mountain was a boarding school for elementary and middle school-age children until about 1930, when it became a residential high school after public elementary schools were established in the region. Some settlement schools closed, but others assumed new functions over time. Hindman Settlement School offers adult education, including GED test preparation, and operates a tutorial program for people with dyslexia. Since the early 1970s Pine Mountain Settlement School has specialized in environmental education; it also has operated an elderhostel program. The Pi Beta Phi Settlement School began an extension called the Craft Work Shop in 1945 in cooperation with the University of Tennessee; it is now an independent nonprofit organization known as the Arrowmont School of Arts and Crafts that provides college and graduate-level courses in arts and crafts.

== List of Appalachian settlement schools ==
The following are examples of settlement schools and other institutions (most no longer in operation) that were first founded as settlement schools:(Note: this material was removed from this collection c. 2012)Alice Lloyd College, Pippa Passes, Kentucky

- Annville Institute, Annville, Kentucky
- Bethel Mennonite Center, Rowdy, Kentucky
- Buckhorn Children's Center, Buckhorn, Kentucky
- John C. Campbell Folk School, Brasstown, North Carolina
- Hazel Green Academy, Hazel Green, Kentucky
- Henderson Settlement School, Frakes, Bell County, Kentucky. Founded in 1921.
- Hindman Settlement School, Hindman, Kentucky
- Hinton Rural Life Center, Hayesville, North Carolina
- Jackson Area Ministries Resource and Training Center, Jackson, Ohio
- Kingdom Come Settlement School, Linefork, Letcher County, Kentucky. Founded in 1924 by Methodists.
- Lotts Creek Community School, Cordia, Knott County, Kentucky. Founded in 1933.
- Oneida Baptist Institute, Oneida, Kentucky
- Pi Beta Phi Settlement School (now Arrowmont School of Arts and Crafts), Gatlinburg, Tennessee
- Pine Mountain Settlement School, Harlan County, Kentucky
- Pittman Community Center, Pittman Center, Tennessee
- Red Bird Mission, Beverly, Bell County, Kentucky. Founded in 1925.
- Riverside Christian Training School, Lost Creek, Breathitt County, Kentucky. Founded in 1905 by the Church of the Brethren.
- Stuart Robinson School, Blackey, Kentucky. Founded in 1913 as a Presbyterian mission.
- Sunset Gap Community Center, Cosby, Tennessee. Started in 1920 by Presbyterians.
- Vardy Community School, Vardy, Hancock County, Tennessee
