= Loraine Wyman =

American singer (1885–1937)

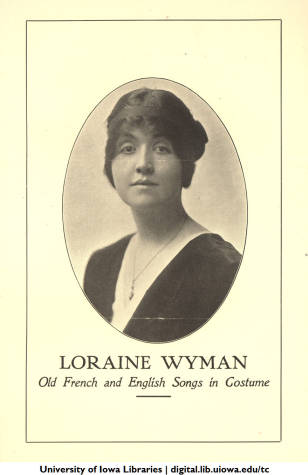
Loraine Wyman portrayed in 1914, in a pamphlet directed to concert promoters

(Julie) Loraine Wyman (October 23, 1885 – September 11, 1937) was an American soprano, noted for her concert performances of folk songs, some of which she collected from traditional singers in field work. Paul J. Stamler has called Wyman "the first real practitioner of the urban folk revival."

== Life ==
=== Early family life ===
Her mother, Julie Moran Wyman (1860–1907) was from Joliet, Illinois, near Chicago. She possessed a mezzo-soprano voice described as a "marvel" and had a successful career as an opera singer.

On 2 April 1880 Julie Moran married Walter C. Wyman (1850–1927), a "coal merchant", "society man", and collector and dealer in Native American anthropological artifacts. He lived in Evanston, Illinois, a suburb of Chicago. Wyman was quite wealthy; the Chicago Tribune remarks that the couple "made their home in the Edwin E. Brown mansion, and maintained there a lavish establishment of servants, horses, and carriages." They were prominent in Evanston social circles. The Wymans had three children, all daughters: Florence (born 25 January 1881), Caroline (born 28 August 1882), and the youngest Loraine (born 23 October 1885 in Evanston).

Wyman's childhood was not always serene. After 1891, her parents lived separately, with Julie taking Loraine and Florence to Paris to live, leaving Caroline with the father. In 1896 Walter Wyman obtained a divorce from his wife on grounds of adultery (he also charged her with addiction to alcohol). As part of the divorce proceedings Wyman successfully obtained custody of all three of his daughters, who joined him in Evanston. Following this there were two occasions in which the daughters fled from their father, attempting to join their mother. Julie Wyman's brother was arrested for helping them in the first of their escape attempts, and for a time after this they were placed under police watch. The Chicago Tribune later described how the mother and daughters made their final escape via New York (March 1897): they were "taken aboard of an outgoing French steamer by a launch which was in waiting in the North [i.e. Hudson] river. Thus she eluded detectives employed by her husband."

Having relocated her children to Paris, Julie Wyman fairly soon returned to North America, where she settled in Toronto and resumed her singing career; between 1898 and 1904 performances by her are recorded in Toronto, New York, Buffalo, Boston, and Cleveland. She eventually moved to Philadelphia. Julie Wyman died a suicide in 1907 in the apartment of her daughter Caroline in New York; Loraine and her older sister Florence were still living in Paris at the time.

=== Musical training ===
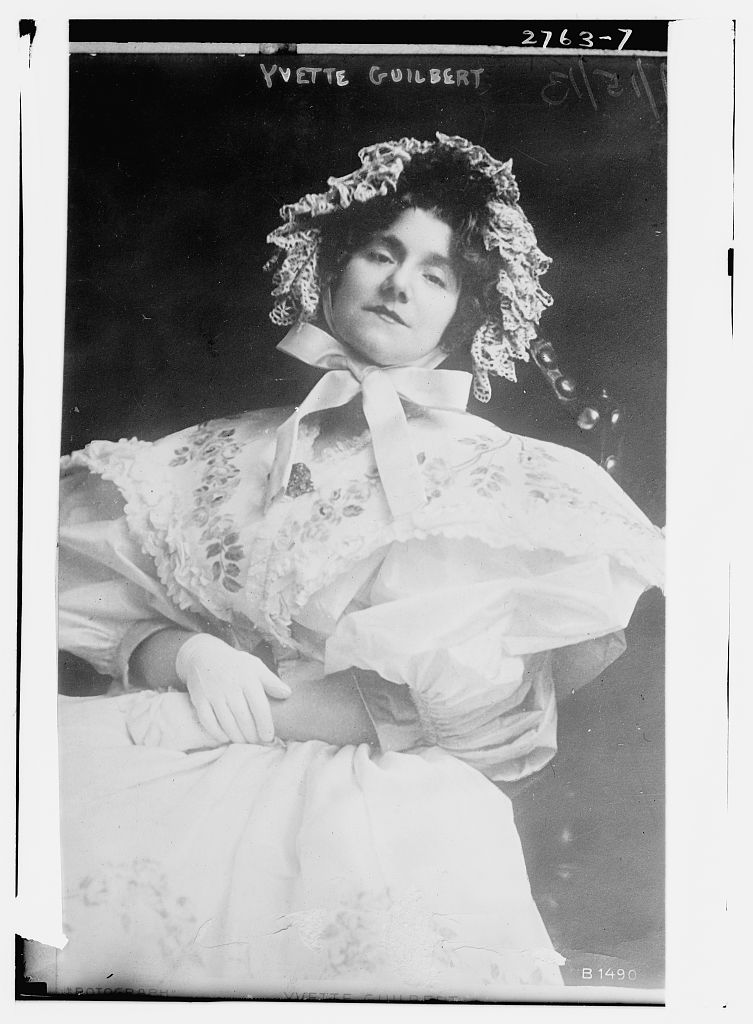
Yvette Guilbert

Amid all this disruption, Loraine Wyman grew to adulthood, mostly in Paris. She learned the French language and developed a sense of connection to France and its people—manifested in her later fundraising efforts during the First World War (see below). She also took up singing, and is reported by one source to have studied with Blanche Marchesi, who had earlier taught her mother. More important were her studies with the celebrated cabaret singer Yvette Guilbert, from whom (Stamler) "she acquired a taste for French and British folksongs."

The French-Canadian folklore specialist Marius Barbeau later asserted that her French training was fundamental to Wyman's artistic approach.

Miss Loraine Wyman makes us realize to what extent a rustic melody can be transformed by art while still preserving its original contour. Although American by birth, Miss Wyman is a representative of French style and taste. The discrimination, finesse, and sincerity of her interpretations relies especially on the tradition founded by Gaston Paris and Julien Tiersot and broadened by Yvette Guilbert, of whom she was a pupil.

=== Launching her career ===
In about 1909 she returned to America, settling in New York. Probably around this time she studied with a leading New York voice teacher, Frida Ashforth. By the following year, she had embarked on a concert career, in which she sang a mixture of folksongs of various origin to urban audiences. Stamler writes,

She became a popular touring concert artist, performing French and British songs in peasant costume and charming audiences and critics across the country. In 1914, the New York Times reported that she had achieved critical success as a performer in London, and in January 1916, she stood in for an ailing Guilbert at the Metropolitan Opera, to rave notices.

A reviewer for the Boston Transcript wrote:

Her voice, a light one, but of fine, agreeable quality and carrying power, has been carefully trained and is expressive. — Her diction is excellent. She has the great gift of humor. In her interpretation naive, pathetic or malicious songs, facial expression and significant gestures add to the effect of her well modulated voice. — There is no extravagance in her performance; she does not go too far; she knows when she has made her points and is willing to give her hearers credit for a certain amount of intelligence.

Smith (2003), reviewing the press accounts, concludes that Wyman consistently delighted her audiences and critics. For example, one review (Rochester Post Express, 13 November 1912) said:

Miss Loraine Wyman gave a costume ballade recital last night before the members of the Alliance Francaise and their friends ... It is doubtful if the audience, no matter what the musical experience of its individuals may have been, has received more enjoyment than was given with a liberal hand by this young songster last night.

=== Performances before 1916 ===
The Théâtre du Gymnase in 1910

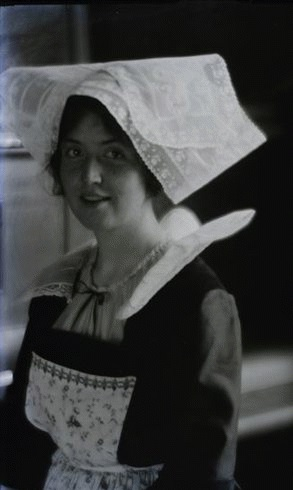
Loraine Wyman in performance costume (here: Breton peasant attire), as portrayed some time in the mid-1910s by her friend the photographer Paul Burty-Haviland

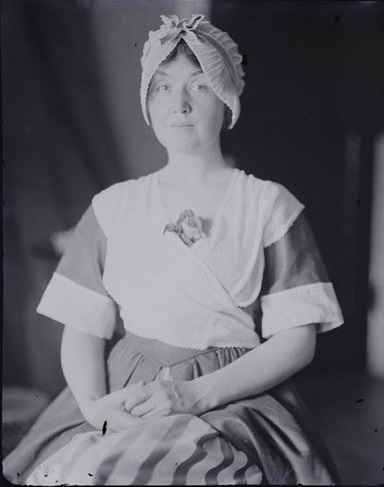
A similar portrait; see caption above.

Wyman's New York debut was in January 1910. Later that year, she left for Europe, performing with her mentor Yvette Guilbert at the Théâtre du Gymnase in Paris in November, 1910, and again at Bechstein Hall (now Wigmore Hall) in London in June 1911. In 1912, Wyman performed at the Women's Musical Club in Toronto, where her mother had appeared twelve years earlier. By 1913 she was well enough known to be invited to perform at the White House before President Taft and the assembled members of the Supreme Court. In 1914, she performed in London and Paris, taking the opportunity to research more folk song material in "old monasteries and libraries" there. Later that year, she went to perform in Chicago and Evanston, where she had not been since her childhood; a number of performances were in homes of old family friends. In 1915 Wyman crossed the continent for performances in the Los Angeles area.

=== Appalachian fieldwork ===
The early stages of Wyman's performing career coincided with a widespread awakening of interest in the folk songs of the southern Appalachian mountains, where the local population—at the time quite geographically isolated—had conserved and evolved a centuries-long heritage of melody and lyrics by oral transmission across generations. Already, several state folklore societies had formed to collect and record these songs, and Olive Dame Campbell had gathered (though not published) a fairly extensive body of material. Previously, Wyman had sung on stage only folksongs gathered by others, mostly French and British, and it is only natural that she would develop an interest in field work in such a fertile territory, fieldwork whose results would permit her to expand her performing repertoire with American material.

Thus in 1916 Wyman undertook, with her accompanist the composer Howard Brockway, a six-week journey through the Cumberland Mountains to collect Appalachian folk songs. A contemporary reviewer described the work as follows:

Attracted to the songs by a study of their purely literary aspects as published some time ago by Professor Bradley, these two musical patriots tramped some 300 miles through the Kentucky wilds, "climbing mountains, fording streams, enduring superlative discomforts and ... rebuffs from the suspicious inhabitants, but emerging in the end with something like eighty entrancing melodic specimens in their note-books, representing both the 'lonesome tunes' and 'fast music', as they are called."

Wyman and Brockway began their efforts at the Pine Mountain Settlement School, where they had been invited by co-director Ethel DeLong Zande. They also worked at the Hindman Settlement School, and ultimately journeyed through seven counties of eastern Kentucky: Knott, Harlan, Letcher, Estill, Pulaski, Magoffin, and Jackson.

Concerning the delicate task of persuading the inhabitants to share their songs, Wyman wrote:

The [inhabitants] seldom responded readily to our requests...If they did not refuse pointblank, they would plead a cold or hoarseness as an excuse for not singing at once. The ruse actually worked with me for a while, but I presently came to see through it and continued to ply my arguments and pleadings. Often it was necessary to sing for them first. Then, forgetting their reserve, they would seek to correct me in some detail and present we had what we had sought, tho[ugh] it sometimes required much persuasion to make them repeat a melody or even a phrase. Our first song we obtained from a little girl of fourteen, who, however, was so shy about singing that she consented to do it only on condition that we let her withdraw to the end of a dark hall, where she could not be seen.

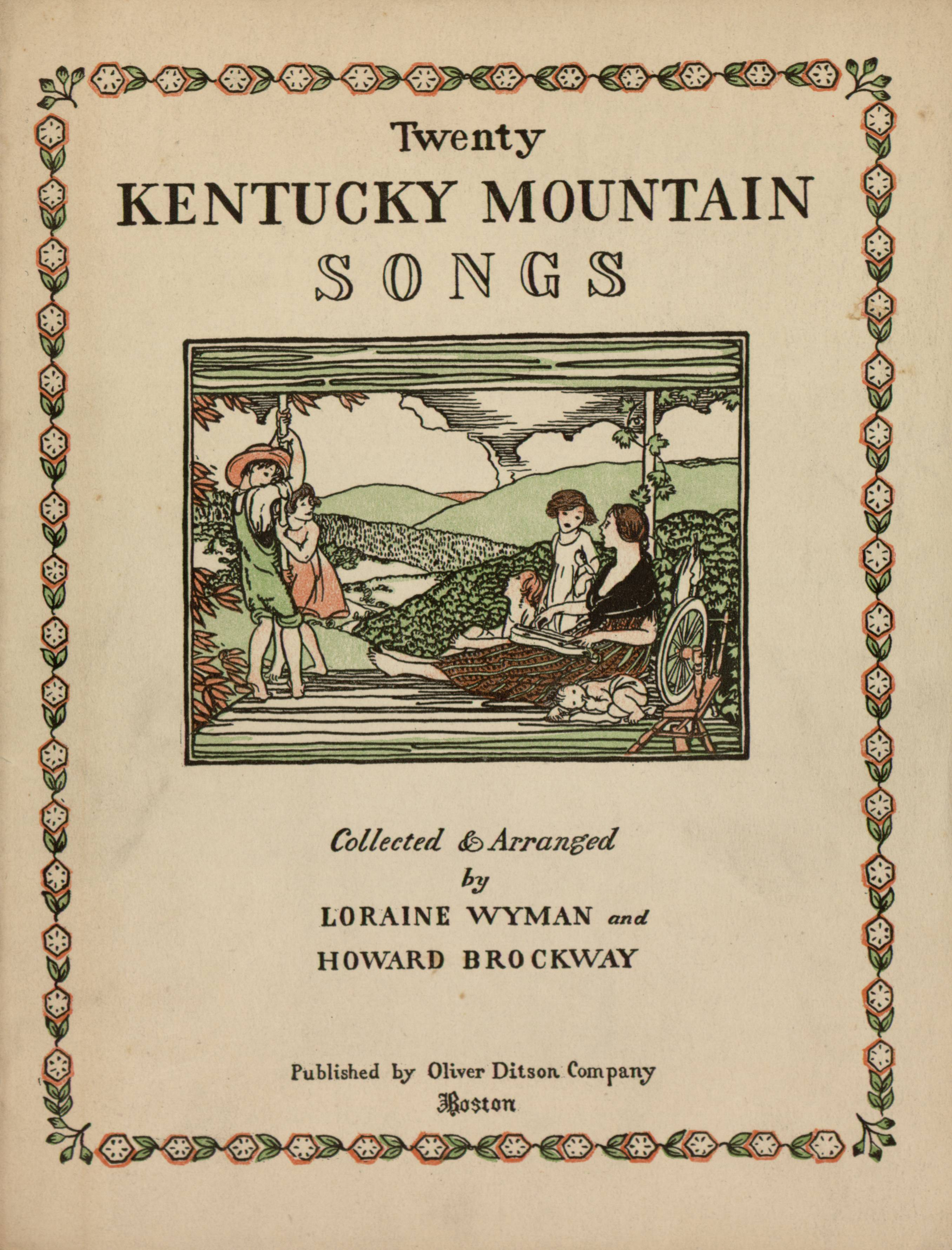
Cover of Twenty Kentucky Mountain Songs. Click to enlarge. The creator of the cover artwork is unidentified but the style suggests Wyman's sister Florence Wyman Ivins; see

On returning to their base in New York, Wyman and Brockway began to perform on stage the songs they had gathered, using piano accompaniments composed by Brockway. They premiered their renditions of Appalachian song at the Cort Theater in New York in October 1916, and per Stamler, "continu[ed] for the next decade to uniformly enthusiastic reviews." They also published selected songs from their fieldwork, along with Brockway's piano accompaniments, in two collections:

- Lonesome Tunes: Folk Songs from the Kentucky Mountains (1916) New York: H. W. Gray.
- Twenty Kentucky Mountain Songs (1920) Boston: Oliver Ditson & Co.

Sales figures of these volumes are apparently not available, but Stamler, noting their widespread appearance in library catalogs, infers that they sold well. Lonesome Tunes was reissued by its publisher in 1944, 28 years after initial publication.

The two volumes just mentioned were intended for domestic use and enjoyment, rather than specifically being contributions to the scholarly literature on folk song. Wyman later shared a large amount of her Appalachian material with the doyen of American folk song scholars, George Lyman Kittredge, who published some of it (properly acknowledging Wyman) in a 1917 scholarly article.

As her career continued to flourish Wyman made efforts to "give back" (as we would say today) to the Appalachian community. In 1917 she returned to Chicago to sing Appalachian folk songs in a benefit concert for the Hindman Settlement School, and served on the Advisory Board of the Pine Mountain Settlement School.

=== The Appalachian dulcimer ===
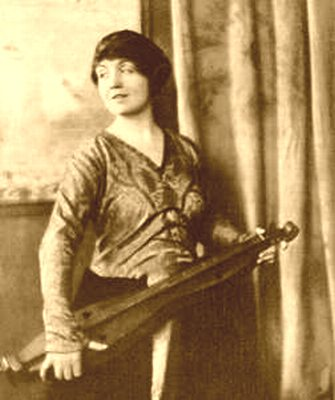
Wyman in Vogue 1917, holding an Appalachian dulcimer. The Vogue article covered several artists, with the theme "the past musical season has been one to encourage the artist who desires to develop his individuality rather than to emulate genius."

At some point, probably on her fieldwork visit to Kentucky, Wyman bought an Appalachian dulcimer, which she demonstrated at the 1916 concert premiering the songs from the Kentucky fieldwork. This may have been the instrument that was depicted in the photograph of Wyman seen at right, which appeared in Vogue on 1 May 1917. Wyman's dulcimer was the work of J. Edward Thomas (1850–1933), the leading builder of the time.

According to Maud Karpeles, who did fieldwork in the Appalachians around the same time as Wyman, the Appalachian dulcimer was confined to Kentucky at the time and not widely distributed even there. It likewise seems not to have been an essential aspect of Wyman's own performances. Seeger notes that it is a low-volume instrument, more suited to home than public use. Wyman donated her dulcimer to the Bucks County Historical Society at some point before 1926.

=== Fieldwork in Canada ===
In July 1918 she collected French-language folk songs in Percé, Quebec, making use of an Edison phonograph to make recordings of her speakers. She was assisted in the fieldwork by "Mr. Adolfo Betti of the Flonzaley Quartet", who put the music into written notation. The research was published as Wyman (1920). Wyman commented in her article on the nature of folk song fieldwork:

Folk-song gathering, to be well and thoroughly accomplished, must be done slowly and deliberately, regardless of the passing of time. The singer should not be hurried, but should be allowed to give each song as memory brings it back, with reminiscences and casual conversation. Not the least fascinating of the many phases of collecting is the sudden blooming of a seemingly barren field. On making my preliminary inquiries at Percé I should have feared to return empty-handed from my eager quest, had I not known the elusiveness of the folk-song singer. Some of the best songs were obtained from people who, at first, professed utter ignorance of the subject.

Her performances around the same time before members of the Montreal branch of the American Folklore Society stimulated Canadian scholars to undertake fieldwork on French Canadian folk song.

Wyman later collaborated in further French Canadian fieldwork with Marius Barbeau; Barbeau (1920) mentions an unpublished set of folksongs, "Collection Barbeau-Wyman", consisting of "60 songs with text and phonograph recording, collected at Notre-Dame-du-Portage (Témiscouata) and Saint-André (Kamouraska). The same archive held Wyman's Percé songs.

=== Later life ===
Wyman's concertizing continued throughout the second half of the 1910s and first half of the 1920s, often in performances for charitable causes put on by the upper stratum of New York City society. During the First World War, these included benefits for the soldiers of the French Army, as well as concerts in aid of French musicians impoverished by the war.

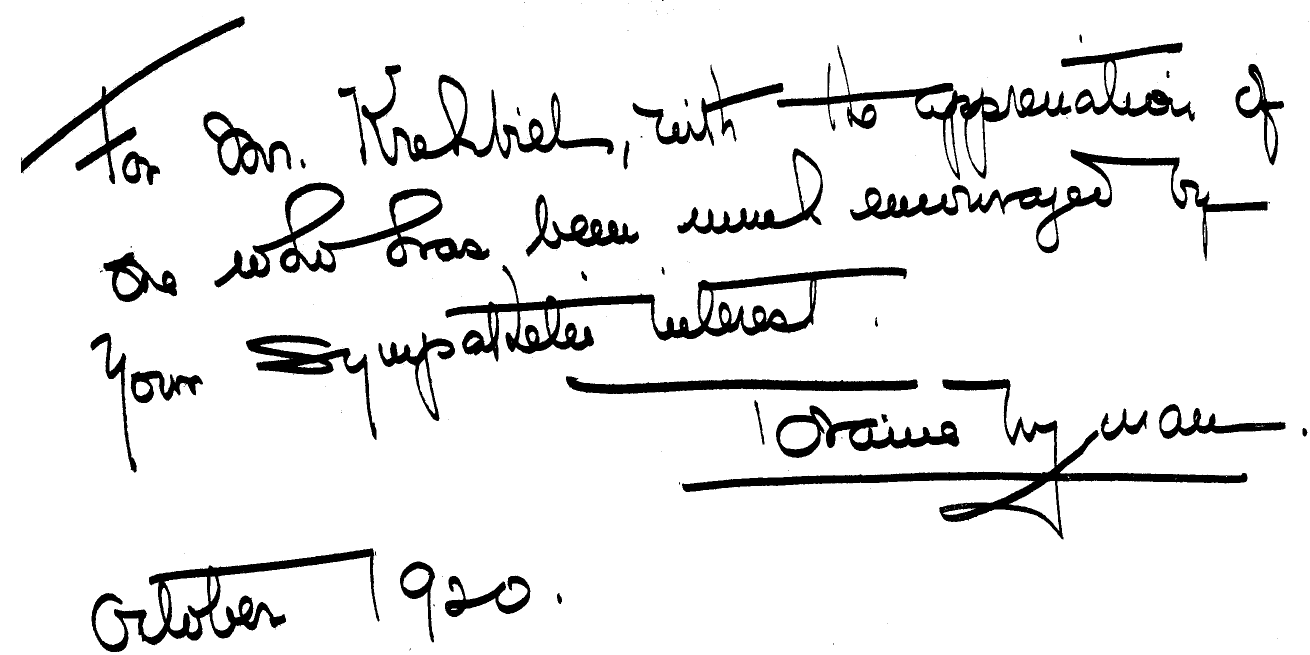
Inscription made by Loraine Wyman in a copy of Twenty Kentucky Mountain Songs, presented by her in 1920 as a courtesy to Henry Krehbiel, "dean of New York music critics" and an enthusiast for Wyman's performances. The signature closely matches another, printed in Lonesome Tunes. Click to enlarge.

In the first half of the 1920s Wyman frequently appeared on concert programs with the early music specialist, harpsichordist, and pedagogue Arthur Whiting, usually in college and university settings. Wyman herself owned a harpsichord, a 1921 model built by the Gaveau firm in France.

She served for a time (ca. 1922–1923) on the faculty of the Mannes School of Music as a teacher of English and French diction; Howard Brockway was also teaching there in the piano department.

A review of one of her performances in 1924 by Olin Downes in the New York Times praised her as "an excellent musician" but also reported her as being "not in good vocal condition". No further New York performances, it appears, were subsequently reported in the Times. Her last public performances for which documentation survives took place in 1925.

On 14 July 1926, Wyman married a wealthy obstetrician and medical school professor named Henry McMahon Painter (12 July 1863 – 11 March 1934), whose patients include members of prominent New York families. According to Minton, Wyman and Painter had been lovers for many years; earlier in 1926 Painter had obtained a divorce from his wife. Painter retired from medicine in 1928; Wyman moved with him to France, where they lived in Grez-sur-Loing, an artist-colony village not far from Paris. They later returned to New York, where Painter died in 1934.

With her marriage Wyman disappeared entirely from public life. She died in New York 11 September 1937, aged 51.

== Scholarly legacy ==
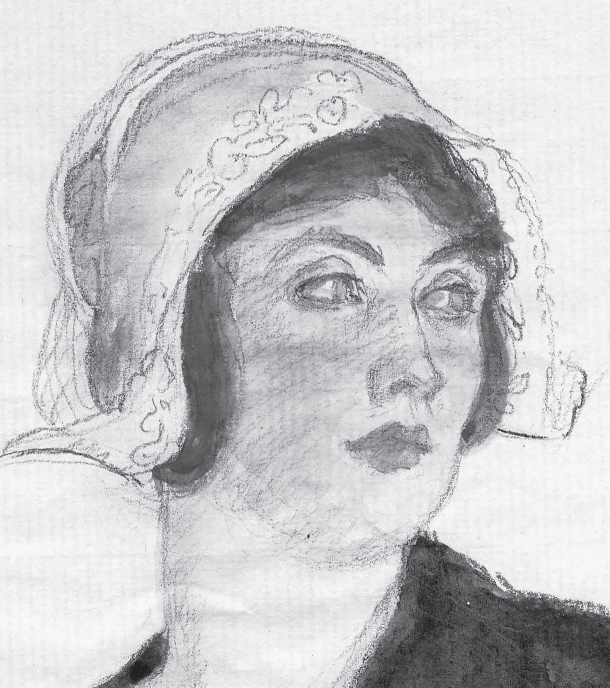
Portrait of Loraine Wyman in French costume by her sister Florence Wyman Ivins

Loraine Wyman left a substantial scholarly library, "an extensive collection of books about folk music and folklore mostly of the British Isles, the United States and France." On her death the collection, along with other materials, passed to her older sister Florence Wyman Ivins, who in the meantime had become a well-known artist. The elder sister donated these materials to Connecticut College in 1948. The scholarly books remain in the Special Collections of the Connecticut College Library. Loraine Wyman's field notes and other papers were transferred in 2004 to an archive at Brown University, where they reside today. Her Gaveau harpsichord was transferred to the Yale University Collection of Musical Instruments. The field notes she shared with George Lyman Kittredge are preserved in Houghton Library at Harvard University.

== Influence and assessment ==
Loraine Wyman is an almost totally forgotten figure today. The two published accounts of her life (Lee and McNeil 2001 and Stamler 2012) are both brief and incomplete, and the flurry of interest in the 1910s in Appalachian folk music which she helped create is little remembered; nowadays when one speaks of a "folk revival" in America, this is taken to mean the later period of interest in the 1940s through 1960s, going from Pete Seeger to Bob Dylan (for details see roots revival). Wyman's Appalachian field work with Brockway was outshone by the far more comprehensive study of Cecil Sharp and Maud Karpeles, begun almost exactly at the moment Wyman and Brockway left Kentucky. Wyman and Brockway's Appalachian volumes were later denigrated by the folk song scholar D. K. Wilgus, who complained that the texts had been altered and the singers of individual songs not identified.

Nevertheless, Wyman's work was and is appreciated by various individuals. The Australian composer-pianist Percy Grainger, who had a strong interest in folk music and did field work on folk songs himself, performed the Wyman-Brockway settings in public, and noted a kind of emotional connection to the published volumes: he performed the songs in Lonesome Tunes at home with his mother (taking the vocal part on a saxophone or sarrusophone), and said of the book after her death "in other ways, also, a most sacred relic to me".

Stamler writes:

Loraine Wyman's work demands respect. She shone a popular light on Appalachian culture, and she presented the material in concert and in books in a way that, according to all available accounts, was designed to both inform and delight her readers and listeners while treating her sources with dignity and respect. For the first practitioner of the urban folk revival, that is no small accomplishment.

== List of publications by Loraine Wyman ==
- Brockway, Howard, and Loraine Wyman (1917) Le jardinier indifferent (Basse-Normandie). For vocal solo with piano accompaniment composed by Brockway. New York : H.W. Gray.
- Brockway, Howard, and Loraine Wyman (1918) The nightingale : Harlan Co., Kentucky. Set for four-part women's chorus (SSAA). Publisher: New York : H.W. Gray.
- Brockway, Howard, and Loraine Wyman (1918) Brother Green or The dying soldier. (Harlan County, Kentucky). Set for a capella mixed chorus with rehearsal accompaniment for piano. New York, H.W. Gray.
- Prunières, Henry (1920) G. Francesco Malipiero. Translated from the French by Loraine Wyman. The Musical Quarterly 6: 326–341.
- Wyman, Loraine, and Howard Brockway (1916) Lonesome Tunes: Folk Songs from the Kentucky Mountains. New York: H. W. Gray.
- Wyman, Loraine, and Howard Brockway (1920) Twenty Kentucky Mountain Songs Boston: Oliver Ditson & Co.
- Wyman, Loraine (1920) Songs from Percé. Journal of American Folklore, Vol. 33, No. 130 (Oct. – Dec., 1920), pp. 321–335. Available on JSTOR.
