= Ethel de Long Zande =

American educator (1879–1928)

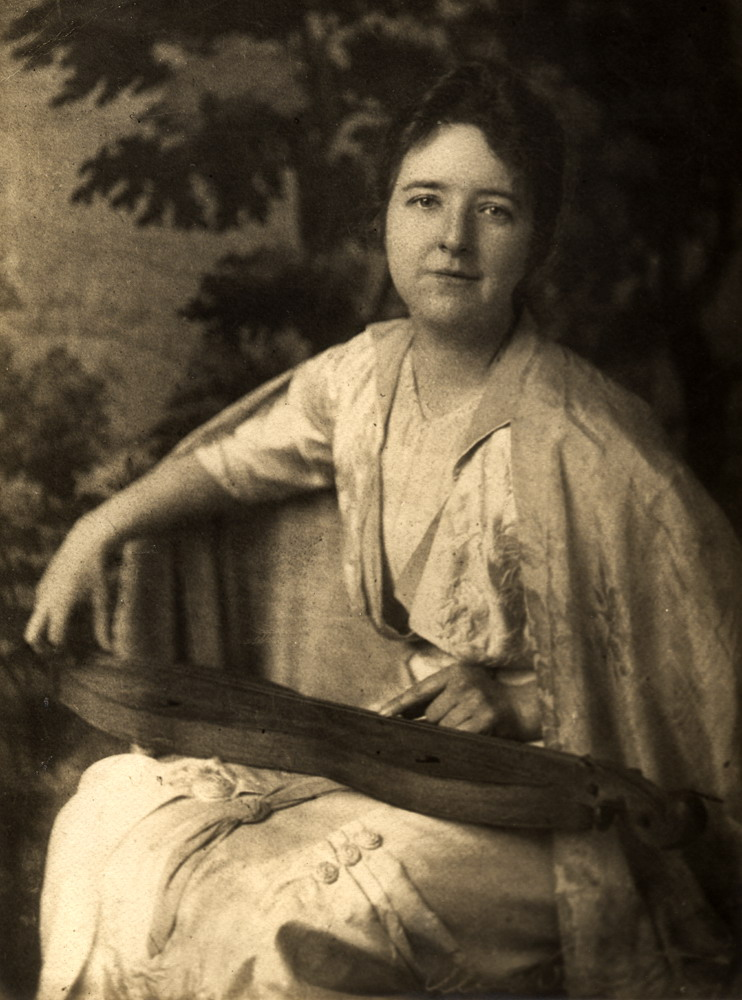
- Ethel de Long Zande with a mountain dulcimer, c. 1915
- Born: 1879; Montclair, New Jersey
- Died: March 18, 1928 (aged 48–49)
- Education: Smith College
- Occupation: Educator
- Spouse: Luigi Zande
- Children: Alberto, Elena

Ethel Marguerite de Long Zande (1879–1928) was an American educator from New Jersey who contributed to the settlement school movement of the early 20th century.

== Background ==
De Long was born in 1879 to George and Arabella M. de Long in Montclair, New Jersey. De Long's father and younger sister were semi-invalids, so de Long became a caregiver for her family at an early age. Her family moved with her to Northampton, Massachusetts, when de Long started attending Smith College in 1897, so that she would still be able to care for them. While a student, de Long had to take out loans, work as a tutor, and teach at the Easthampton High School. After she graduated from Smith in 1901, she worked as a teacher at Central High in Springfield, Massachusetts. In 1905, she moved to Indianapolis, Indiana, where she taught English at the Manual Training High School for five years.

== Settlement schools ==
De Long was invited by May Stone and Katherine Pettit to become the principal of the Women's Christian Temperance Union Settlement School in Hindman, Kentucky, later to become the Hindman Settlement School. In 1912, de Long joined Pettit in leaving Hindman to establish the Pine Mountain Settlement School.

In the division of labor determined by Pettit and de Long, de Long was responsible for the academic and industrial departments and supervised the fiscal and administrative work of the school.

Among her many contributions to the school, de Long assisted with the physical design of the school and was a skilled fundraiser. In 1913, de Long enlisted the help of the architect Mary Rockwell Hook to create a master plan for the new school. De Long's network of women she had met while at Smith College also proved a useful base for fundraising and for hiring workers for the school. She traveled all over the country, giving talks at schools and organizations to raise money for the school.

== Personal life ==
In April 1918, de Long married Luigi Zande, an Italian stonemason who had been working at Pine Mountain. Zande built a cottage at the school for them to live in, which came to be known as the Zande House and is still in use at Pine Mountain.

The Zandes had two children: Alberto, born in Louisville, Kentucky on March 19, 1919; and Elena, born on December 28, 1922, who was adopted.

== Later life ==
De Long died on March 18, 1928, of breast cancer. In her honor, the Montclair Pine Mountain Association placed a brass memorial plate in the transept of the Pine Mountain Chapel.
