= Theodor Ziehen =

German neurologist and psychiatrist

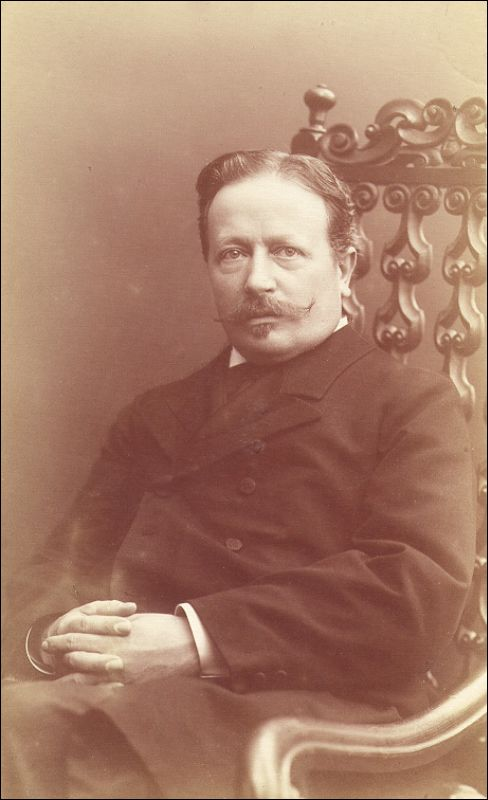
Theodor Ziehen (1862-1950)

Georg Theodor Ziehen (12 November 1862 – 29 December 1950) was a German neurologist and psychiatrist born in Frankfurt am Main. He was the son of noted author, Eduard Ziehen (1819–1884).

== Education and career ==
As a gymnasium student, Ziehen studied the works of Immanuel Kant and Arthur Schopenhauer at Lessing-Gymnasium in Frankfurt. Later he studied medicine in Würzburg and Berlin, where he received his doctorate in 1885. While a medical student he studied the writings of David Hume, Spinoza, Plato and George Berkeley. Following graduation he worked as an assistant to Karl Ludwig Kahlbaum at the mental hospital in Görlitz, and in 1887 became an assistant to Otto Binswanger at the psychiatric clinic in Jena. At Jena one of his patients was philosopher Friedrich Nietzsche.

Subsequently, Ziehen became a professor of psychiatry in Utrecht (from 1900), Halle (from 1903) and Berlin (1904–1912). In 1912 he moved with his family to a small villa in Wiesbaden, where he spent the next few years as a private scholar. From 1917 he worked as a professor of philosophy at the University of Halle, and in 1930 he retired to Wiesbaden, where he died on 29 December 1950.

== Research ==
Ziehen published nearly 450 works on psychology, neurology, anatomy, et al. He was author of a textbook titled Die Geisteskrankheiten des Kindesalters (Mental Diseases of Childhood), a book that reportedly was the first systematic work on child psychiatry in Germany. He also penned Psychiatrie für Ärzte und Studirende, a textbook that was published in four editions between 1894 and 1911. In his writings, Ziehen is credited with introducing the terms "affective psychosis" and "psychopathic constitution".

Along with neurologist Hermann Oppenheim, the "Ziehen-Oppenheim syndrome" is named, a condition defined as genetic torsion dystonia (spasms) due to a lesion of the basal ganglia.

As an anatomist, Ziehen published a series of extensive descriptions of the human spinal cord, medulla oblongata, pons and cerebellum in Karl von Bardeleben's handbook of human anatomy (Handbuch der Anatomie des Menschen). These contributions, which, to set the level of detail within them into perspective, amounted to approximately 700 pages on the cerebellum alone, appeared between 1899 and 1934 and were collected in two tomes published in 1903 and 1934, respectively, by the Gustav Fischer Verlag in Jena. Among his other anatomical contributions was the coining of the term nucleus accumbens, which he described in the brain of the common ringtail possum as part of his survey of the neuroanatomy of the marsupials and monotremes.

In 1898 he published Psychophysiologische Erkenntnistheorie (Psychophysiological Theory of Knowledge), with psychology being the basis of his philosophic belief system. He was a practitioner of associative psychology, and from a philosophic standpoint advocated monistic positivism, or what he called the "principle of immanence".

== Selected works ==
- Sphygmographische Untersuchungen an Geisteskranken (Sphygmographic studies on the mentally ill), Jena, 1887.
- Leitfaden der physiologischen Psychologie (Guide to physiological psychology), Jena, 1891
- Das Centralnervensystem der Cetaceen (The central nervous system of cetaceans), 1892.
- Psychiatrie für Ärzte und Studirende (Psychiatry for doctors and students), 1894
- Das Centralnervensystem der Monotremen und Marsupialier (The central nervous system of monotremes and marsupials), 1897.
- Psychophysiologische Erkenntnistheorie (Psychophysiological Epistemology), Jena, 1898.
- Anatomie des Centralnervensystems (Anatomy of the central nervous system), In: Handbuch der Anatomie des Menschen, Jena, 1899. Zweite Abteilung 1934.
- Über die allgemeinen Beziehungen zwischen Gehirn und Seelenleben (Concerning the overall relations between the brain and soul), Leipzig, 1902.
- Anatomie des Nervensystems (edited with Richard Zander) in: Handbuch der Anatomie des Menschen – (Anatomy of the nervous system), 1903.
- Die Prinzipien und Methoden der Begabungs-, insbesondere der Intelligenzprüfung (Principles and methods of high-ability, in particular the assessment of intelligence), 1908; 5. Aufl., 1923.
- Die Erkennung der psychopathischen Konstitutionen und die öffentliche Fürsorge für psychopatisch veranlagte Kinder (Detection of psychopathic constitutions and public concern for psychopathic-assessed children), Jena, 1912; 3. Aufl., 1916.
- Ärztliche Wünsche zur Fürsorgeerziehung (Requests for medical care education), Langensalza, 1913.
- Erkenntnistheorie auf psychophysiologischer und physikalisher Grundlage, Jena, 1913.
- Zum gegenwärtigen Stand der Erkenntnistheorie : zugleich Versuch einer Einteilung der Erkenntnistheorien (The present state of epistemology: with an attempt to schedule realization theories) Wiesbaden: J. F. Bergmann, 1914.
- Die Grundlagen der Psychologie, (Foundations of psychology), Leipzig and Berlin, 1915.
- Die Geisteskrankheiten des Kindesalters einschließlich des Schwachsinns und der psychopathischen Konstitutionen (Mental illnesses of childhood, including psychopathic constitutions) 2 parts, Berlin, 1915-1917; second edition, 1926.
- Das Verhältnis der Logik zur Mengenlehre, Berlin, 1917.
- Über das Wesen der Beanlagung und ihre methodische Erforschung (Regarding the nature of "Beanlagung" and their methodical exploration); Langensalza, 1918; fourth edition, 1929.
- Lehrbuch der Logik auf positivistischer Grundlage mit Berücksichtigung der Geschichte der Logic, Bonn, 1920.
- Die Beziehungen der Lebenserscheinungen zum Bewußtsein (The relationship of life to awareness-appearances) 1921.
- Grundlage der Naturphilosophie (Basis of nature philosophy), 1922.
- Vorlesungen über Ästhetik (Lectures on aesthetics); (2 volumes), 1923 und 1925).
- Das Seelenleben der Jugendlichen (The "soul lives" of young people); Langensalza, 1923; fourth edition, 1931.
- Die Grundlagen der Charakterologie (The foundations of character studies); Langensalza, 1930.
