= Evelyn K. Wells =

American folklorist

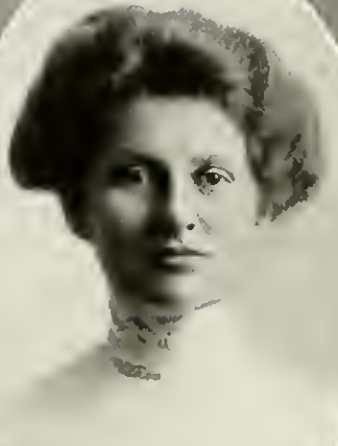
- Evelyn K. Wells, from the 1913 yearbook of Wellesley College
- Born: Evelyn Kendrick Wells; February 20, 1891; Newton, Massachusetts, U.S.
- Died: August 1979 (aged 88); Summit, New Jersey, U.S.
- Occupation(s): Folklorist, college professor, educator
- Relatives: Eliza Hall Kendrick (cousin)

Evelyn Kendrick Wells (February 20, 1891 – August 1979) was an American folklorist and educator, on the faculty of Wellesley College from 1936 to 1956.

== Early life and education ==
Wells was born in Newton, Massachusetts, the daughter of Henry Bartlett Wells and Emma Claflin Wells. Her father was a businessman. She graduated from Wellesley College in 1913. She completed a master's degree at Wellesley in 1934. She was a member of Phi Beta Kappa.

== Career ==
Wells worked at the Hartridge School in New Jersey after college. She was secretary of Pine Mountain Settlement School in Kentucky for fifteen years, beginning in 1916, and was interim director of the school in 1931. She was an English professor at Wellesley College from 1936 to 1956. She taught a course on the ballad that gained some press attention in 1937. She was a contributing editor of The Country Dancer, the journal of the Country Dance Society of America. She served on the board of directors of the Northeast Folklore Society.

== Publications ==
- "A Little True Blue American" (1920)
- "Playford Tunes and Broadside Ballads" (1937)
- The Ballad Tree: A Study of British and American Ballads, Their Folklore, Verse and Music, Together with Sixty Traditional Ballads and Their Tunes (1950)
- "Some Impressions of the Conference" (1951)
- "Some Currents of British Folk Song in America 1916-1958" (1958)
- "Cecil Sharp in America" (1959)

== Personal life ==
Before 1940, Wells lived with her older cousin, Eliza Hall Kendrick, who taught Biblical history at Wellesley. Wells died in 1979, at the age of 88, in Summit, New Jersey.
