= Floyd Jacobs House =

Historic house in Missouri, United States

- U.S. National Register of Historic Places
- Location within Missouri Location within the United States
- Location: 5050 Sunset Dr., Kansas City, Missouri
- Coordinates: 39°2′10″N 94°35′53″W
- Area: less than one acre
- Built: 1925
- Architect: Mary Rockwell Hook
- Architectural style: Late 19th and 20th Century Revivals
- MPS: Residential Structures by Mary Rockwell Hook TR
- NRHP reference No.: 83001003
- Added to NRHP: September 8, 1983

The Floyd Jacobs House is a historic home located in Kansas City, Missouri. It was designed by architect Mary Rockwell Hook and built in 1925 in Late 19th and 20th Century Revivals, and other architectural styles. The house was designed to demonstrate the value of hillside lots in its development. It is a three-story, hip roofed dwelling faced in rubble stone and stucco. The design had to accommodate slope and frontage on two streets at different levels. It became home to Floyd Jacobs, a lawyer.

It was listed on the National Register of Historic Places in 1983.
