= Pink House (Kansas City, Missouri) =

Historic house in Missouri, United States

- U.S. National Register of Historic Places
- Location within Missouri Location within the United States
- Location: 5012 Summit St., Kansas City, Missouri
- Coordinates: 39°2′12″N 94°35′47″W
- Area: less than one acre
- Built: 1922
- Architect: Mary Rockwell Hook
- MPS: Residential Structures by Mary Rockwell Hook TR
- NRHP reference No.: 83001015
- Added to NRHP: September 8, 1983

The Pink House is a historic home located at Kansas City, Missouri. It was designed by architect Mary Rockwell Hook and built in 1922. It became known as the "Pink House" for its pink plaster exterior, which was a reference to San Francisco, whose 1915 world fair Hook had visited. It is a two-story dwelling with stucco walls, red clay roofing tile, three balconies, and brick chimney with an arcaded, roofed opening atop its stack.

It was listed on the National Register of Historic Places in 1983.
