= Mary Rockwell Hook House =

Historic house in Missouri, United States

- U.S. National Register of Historic Places
- Location within Missouri Location within the United States
- Location: 4940 Summit St., Kansas City, Missouri
- Coordinates: 39°2′14″N 94°35′47″W
- Area: less than one acre
- Built: 1925-27
- Architect: Mary Rockwell Hook
- MPS: Residential Structures by Mary Rockwell Hook TR
- NRHP reference No.: 83001005
- Added to NRHP: September 8, 1983

The Mary Rockwell Hook House is a historic home located at 4940 Summit St. in Kansas City, Missouri. It was designed by and was home of architect Mary Rockwell Hook.

== History ==
It was built between 1925 and 1927, and consists of a rambling aggregation of intersecting wings and extruding gables, dormers, decks and porches. It included a pool that Hook believed to be one of the first private swimming pools in the Kansas City area. The house is significant both as a work of Mary Rockwell Hook and for its long association with her and her family (husband and two children). The home was in the family until 1972.

It was listed on the National Register of Historic Places in 1983.
