= List of Alpha Sigma Tau chapters =

Alpha Sigma Tau is an American collegiate sorority. It was established at Michigan State Normal College (now Eastern Michigan University) on November 4, 1899. In the following chapter list, active chapters are indicated in bold and inactive chapters and institutions are in italics.

Chapter	Charter date and range	Institution	Location	Status	Ref.
**Alpha**	November 4, 1899 – 1977; 1987–2020; September 1, 2022	Eastern Michigan University	Ypsilanti, Michigan	Active	(Note: Chapter was reformed in 1987 by absorbing Alpha Pi Beta (local).)
**Beta**	April 28, 1905 – 1917; June 8, 1940	Central Michigan University	Mount Pleasant, Michigan	Active	(Note: Chapter was reformed in 1940 from Lambda Alpha Sigma (local), a group that was established in 1912.)
Gamma	January 1, 1909 – 1913	University of Wisconsin–Milwaukee	Milwaukee, Wisconsin	Inactive	
**Delta**	May 25, 1916 – 1919; March 17, 1928	Indiana University of Pennsylvania	Indiana, Pennsylvania	Active	(Note: Chapter was reestablished in 1928 from Delta Tau (local), established in 1923.)
Epsilon (see Lambda)	1919 – 1923	Temple University	Philadelphia, Pennsylvania	Reestablished	(Note: The chapter went inactive and its members withdrew and joined a national sorority on campus. It was reestablished as Lambda in 1926.)
**Zeta**	April 7, 1921	Commonwealth University-Lock Haven	Lock Haven, Pennsylvania	Active	
Iota	April 4, 1923 – 1989; December 4, 2010 – 2015	Emporia State University	Emporia, Kansas	Inactive	(Note: Chapter formed from Delta Gamma Rho (local), established in 1920. It was reformed in 2010 from Beta Lambda Theta (local), established in 2003.)
Theta	May 5, 1923 – 19xx ?; February 25, 1968 – 1985	Wayne State University	Detroit, Michigan	Inactive	
Kappa	January 1, 1924 – 1929	Miami University	Oxford, Ohio	Inactive	(Note: Chapter formed from Alpha Kappa Gamma (local), established in 1922.)
Lambda (see Epsilon)	June 19, 1926 – 1956	Temple University	Philadelphia, Pennsylvania	Inactive	(Note: After going inactive in 1923, the Temple chapter was reestablished with a new name in 1926 from Phi Lambda Sigma (local), established in 1925.)
Sigma	June 6, 1925 – 1954; April 7, 1979 – 2020	State University College at Buffalo	Buffalo, New York	Inactive	(Note: Chapter formed from Tau Phi (local), established in 1921.)
Eta	April 10, 1927 – 1939	Kent State University	Kent, Ohio	Inactive	(Note: Chapter formed from Gamma Sigma Phi (local), established in 1926.)
Mu				Unassigned	
Nu	March 2, 1928 – 1946; May 15, 1948 – 1969	University of Northern Colorado	Greeley, Colorado	Inactive	(Note: Chapter formed from Sigma Tau (local), established before 1928.)
Xi	March 31, 1929 – 1933	Western Colorado University	Gunnison, Colorado	Inactive	(Note: Chapter formed from Omega Omega Omega (local), established in 1927.)
Omicron	May 31, 1930 – 1975; 19xx ?– February 21, 2023	Concord University	Athens, West Virginia	Inactive	(Note: Chapter formed from Beta Theta (local), established in 1923.)
Pi	September 14, 1930 – 1976	Harris–Stowe State University	St. Louis, Missouri	Inactive	(Note: Chapter formed from Rho Phi Gamma (local), established in 1928.)
**Rho**	May 1, 1932	Southeastern Oklahoma State University	Durant, Oklahoma	Active	(Note: Chapter formed from Nu Nu Nu (local), established in 1928.)
Tau				Unassigned	
**Upsilon**	April 13, 1935	University of Central Arkansas	Conway, Arkansas	Active	(Note: Chapter formed from Beta Phi Gamma (local), established in 1933.)
**Zeta Tau**	May 18, 1935	Longwood University	Farmville, Virginia	Active	(Note: Chapter formed from Zeta Tau (local), established in 1926.)
**Phi**	February 17, 1940	Southeastern Louisiana University	Hammond, Louisiana	Active	(Note: Chapter formed from Zeta Gamma Alpha (local), established in 1931.)
**Chi**	May 25, 1940 – c. 1973; September 12, 1992	Shepherd University	Shepherdstown, West Virginia	Active	(Note: Chapter formed from the Teltrahs (local), established in 1938.)
**Psi**	May 19, 1944	James Madison University	Harrisonburg, Virginia	Active	
Omega	May 4, 1945 – 1954	Minot State University	Minot, North Dakota	Inactive	(Note: Chapter formed from Delta Epsilon Phi (local), established in 1926.)
Alpha Alpha	May 26, 1945 – 1972	Ball State University	Muncie, Indiana	Inactive	(Note: Chapter formed from Delta Sigma Alpha (local), established in 1926.)
**Alpha Gamma**	May 4, 1946	Henderson State University	Arkadelphia, Arkansas	Active	(Note: Chapter formed from Tau Alpha (local), established in 1946.)
Alpha Beta	May 11, 1946 – 1959	Marshall University	Huntington, West Virginia	Inactive	(Note: Chapter formed from Kappa Tau Phi (local), established in 1927.)
Alpha Delta	April 24, 1948 – 1970	Missouri State University	Springfield, Missouri	Inactive	(Note: Chapter formed from the Penola Club (local), established in 1930.)
Alpha Epsilon	May 1, 1948 – 2021	Western Illinois University	Macomb, Illinois	Inactive	(Note: Chapter formed from Theta Xi Theta (local), established in 1949.)
**Alpha Lambda**	January 17, 1953	Radford University	Radford, Virginia	Active	(Note: Chapter formed from Lambda Sigma Pi (local), established in 1939.)
Alpha Zeta	June 21, 1958 – 1971	Queens College, City University of New York	New York City, New York	Inactive	(Note: Chapter formed from Epsilon Phi Sigma (local), established in 1937.)
Alpha Eta	May 13, 1959 – 1971	Alma College	Alma, Michigan	Inactive	(Note: Chapter formed from Alpha Philo Society (local), established in 1902.)
Alpha Theta	May 17, 1959 – 1974	University of Detroit Mercy	Detroit, Michigan	Inactive	(Note: Chapter formed from Phi Gamma Nu (local), established in 1931.)
Alpha Omega	January 31, 1960 – 1972	Brooklyn College	Brooklyn, New York City, New York	Inactive	(Note: The Alpha Omega chapter had originally formed as the Lambda chapter of Pi Alpha Tau in 1930. By 1950, that Jewish national sorority had ceased to exist, sparking the CUNY, Brooklyn College group to choose a new name and operate as Sigma Tau Delta (local). The date of the name change is unknown. It then absorbed a sister chapter at Syracuse, the former Mu chapter of Pi Alpha Tau, which had survived under a different local name. The two operated as a regional sorority that merged into Alpha Sigma Tau by 1960.)
Alpha Iota	April 23, 1960 – 1972	Syracuse University	Syracuse, New York	Inactive	(Note: Chapter formed from Pi Alpha Mu (local), established in 1949. The naming convention suggests it was in the process of becoming the Mu chapter of Pi Alpha Tau, a small national fraternity that would soon disband. After stabilizing as a local, it became part of a two-chapter group called Sigma Tau Delta ΣΤΔ, , banding with a CUNY Brooklyn chapter that had also been jettisoned from Pi Alpha Tau, and which had adopted the Sigma Tau Delta name. The two chapters joined as ΣΤΔ between 1950 and 1960, maybe officially in 1957. They both merged into Alpha Sigma Tau in 1960. Note that another sorority, Sigma Delta Tau evolved a few years before this time on the Syracuse campus, but the dates don't exactly match up, and the predecessor at Syracuse for ΣΔΤ was a known local called Beta Chi Alpha - no connection.)
Alpha Kappa	January 28, 1961 – 1983	Marietta College	Marietta, Ohio	Inactive	(Note: Chapter formed from Pi Theta Gamma (local), established in 1959.)
Alpha Mu	May 5, 1962 – 2014	University of Arkansas at Monticello	Monticello, Arkansas	Inactive	
Alpha Nu	May 12, 1962 – 1973; March 10, 1979 – 1983	University of Central Missouri	Warrensburg, Missouri	Inactive	
**Alpha Xi**	May 2, 1965	Commonwealth University-Mansfield	Mansfield, Pennsylvania	Active	(Note: Chapter formed from The Collegians (local), established in 1961 at Mansfield University of Pennsylvania, now called Commonwealth University-Mansfield.)
Alpha Omicron	January 29, 1966 – December 18, 2015	Clarion University of Pennsylvania	Clarion, Pennsylvania	Inactive	(Note: Chapter formed from Sigma Delta Phi (local), established in 1930.) (Note: California, Edinboro, and Clarion Universities of Pennsylvania merged to become Pennsylvania Western University, "PennWest", with three campuses, in 2022.)
**Alpha Pi**	April 24, 1966	Slippery Rock University	Slippery Rock, Pennsylvania	Active	
Alpha Rho	April 20, 1968 – 1975; April 28, 1990 – 199x ?	Youngstown State University	Youngstown, Ohio	Inactive	
Alpha Sigma	April 28, 1968 – 1977	Truman State University	Kirksville, Missouri	Inactive	
Alpha Chi	March 16, 1969 – 1978	Northeastern University	Boston, Massachusetts	Inactive	(Note: Chapter formed from Delta Pi Alpha (local), established in 1961.)
Alpha Tau	March 2, 1969 – February 21, 2023	PennWest Edinboro	Edinboro, Pennsylvania	Inactive	(Note: The sorority's national council suspended the chapter in 2023.)
Alpha Upsilon	March 23, 1969 – 1971	Bryant University	Smithfield, Rhode Island	Inactive	(Note: Chapter formed from Phi Upsilon (local), established in 1951.)
**Alpha Phi**	March 29, 1969	West Chester University	West Chester, Pennsylvania	Active	(Note: Chapter formed from Sigma Kappa Rho (local), established in 1968.)
**Alpha Psi**	April 27, 1969 – 1971; November 12, 2016	University of Northern Iowa	Cedar Falls, Iowa	Active	(Note: Chapter formed from Kappa Theta Psi (local), established in 1906.)
Beta Alpha		Salem College	Salem, West Virginia	Never chartered	(Note: This colony operated from 1969 to 1970, but went inactive before being chartered.)
Beta Beta	April 18, 1970 – 1980	Widener University	Chester, Pennsylvania	Inactive	(Note: Chapter formed from Eta Iota (local), established in 1968.)
Beta Gamma		University of New Haven	West Haven, Connecticut	Never chartered	(Note: This colony was never chartered.)
Beta Zeta	November 14, 1970 – 1994	University of Alabama at Birmingham	Birmingham, Alabama	Inactive	(Note: Chapter formed from Alpha Sigma (local), established in 1970 to join ΑΣΤ.)
Beta Epsilon	March 13, 1971 – 2023	Shippensburg University of Pennsylvania	Shippensburg, Pennsylvania	Inactive	
**Beta Delta**	April 24, 1971	Duquesne University	Pittsburgh, Pennsylvania	Active	
**Beta Eta**	May 28, 1972	Southern Illinois University Edwardsville	Edwardsville, Illinois	Active	(Note: Chapter formed from Kappa Alpha Mu (local), established in 1960.)
**Beta Tau**	April 12, 1975	University of Massachusetts Lowell	Lowell, Massachusetts	Active	(Note: Chapter formed from Beta Tau (local), established in 1969.)
**Beta Theta**	April 24, 1976	St. Mary's University, Texas	San Antonio, Texas	Active	(Note: Chapter formed from Sigma Tau (local), established in 1966.)
**Beta Iota**	May 1, 1976	Millersville University of Pennsylvania	Millersville, Pennsylvania	Active	(Note: Chapter formed from Kappa Alpha Tau (local), established in 1968.)
Beta Kappa		American International College	Springfield, Massachusetts	Never chartered	(Note: This colony was formed from Phi Gamma Nu (local), established in 1975. Although the colony was active from 1977 to 1978, it went inactive before being chartered.)
**Beta Mu**	November 18, 1978	Salisbury University	Salisbury, Maryland	Active	
Beta Lambda	January 20, 1979 – 1982	University of Texas at San Antonio	San Antonio, Texas	Inactive	
Beta Nu	December 8, 1979 – 2020	Bloomsburg University of Pennsylvania	Bloomsburg, Pennsylvania	Inactive	(Note: Chapter formed from Tau Sigma Tau (local), established in 1967.)
**Beta Xi**	December 6, 1980	Michigan Technological University	Houghton, Michigan	Active	
Beta Omicron	December 8, 1980 – 1981	University of Wisconsin–Green Bay	Green Bay, Wisconsin	Inactive	
**Beta Pi**	January 30, 1982	Eastern Illinois University	Charleston, Illinois	Active	
**Beta Rho**	April 23, 1983 – 1986; November 23, 2013	Arkansas Tech University	Russellville, Arkansas	Active	(Note: Chapter formed from Sigma Xi Omega (local), established in 1981.)
Beta Sigma		Northeastern State University	Tahlequah, Oklahoma	Never chartered	(Note: Colony operated from 1982 to 1983, but went inactive before being chartered.)
**Beta Upsilon**	April 30, 1983	New Jersey Institute of Technology	Newark, New Jersey	Active	
**Beta Phi**	May 7, 1983	Pennsylvania Western University, California	California, Pennsylvania	Active	(Note: Chapter formed from Beta Pi Gamma, established in 1979.)
Beta Psi	May 5, 1984 – 1997	Saint Louis University	St. Louis, Missouri	Inactive	(Note: Chapter formed from Theta Phi Theta (local), established in 1972.)
**Beta Chi**	March 16, 1985	Ferris State University	Big Rapids, Michigan	Active	
Gamma Alpha	May 18, 1985 – 1994	University of Rio Grande	Rio Grande, Ohio	Inactive	(Note: Chapter formed from Zeta Theta Chi (local), established in 1959.)
**Beta Omega**	April 19, 1986	Monmouth University	West Long Branch, New Jersey	Active	
**Gamma Delta**	April 24, 1987 – 199x ?; April 14, 1999	University of Massachusetts Dartmouth	Dartmouth, Massachusetts	Active	
Gamma Beta	May 2, 1987 – 1992	Lake Superior State University	Sault Ste. Marie, Michigan	Inactive	
**Gamma Gamma**	May 17, 1987	University of West Alabama	Livingston, Alabama	Active	
Gamma Epsilon	January 23, 1988 – 2024	State University of New York at Potsdam	Potsdam, New York	Inactive	
**Gamma Zeta**	April 30, 1988	Frostburg State University	Frostburg, Maryland	Active	(Note: Chapter formed from Lambda Phi Delta (local), established in 1969.)
**Gamma Theta**	November 18, 1989	Penn State Erie, The Behrend College	Erie, Pennsylvania	Active	
Gamma Eta	January 20, 1990 – 1995	Northwood University, Texas Campus	Fort Worth, Texas	Inactive	(Note: Chapter formed from Sigma Tau (local), established in 1981.)
**Gamma Iota**	March 10, 1990 – September 29, 2017; 2023	York College of Pennsylvania	Spring Garden Township, Pennsylvania	Active	(Note: Chapter formed from Sigma Delta Rho (local), established in 1981. It was closed by the national sorority in 2017 for hazing violations.)
Gamma Kappa		Averett University	Danville, Virginia	Never chartered	(Note: This colony operated from 1990 to 1991, but went inactive before being chartered.)
**Gamma Lambda**	April 7, 1990	Kutztown University of Pennsylvania	Kutztown, Pennsylvania	Active	(Note: Chapter formed from Sigma Tau Omega (local), established in 1984.)
Gamma Mu	November 10, 1990 – 2019	West Virginia University Institute of Technology	Beckley, West Virginia	Inactive	
Gamma Chi	December 8, 1990 – October 16, 2015	William Paterson University	Wayne, New Jersey	Inactive	(Note: Chapter formed from Gamma Chi (local), established in 1965. The sorority's national council closed the chapter for hazing violations.)
Gamma Nu	March 23, 1991 – 1999	Waynesburg University	Waynesburg, Pennsylvania	Inactive	
**Gamma Xi**	April 13, 1991	Grand Valley State University	Allendale, Michigan	Active	(Note: Chapter formed from Zeta Delta Chi (local), established in 1985.)
Gamma Omicron		Cameron University	Lawton, Oklahoma	Never chartered	(Note: This colony operated between 1991 and 1992, but went inactive before being chartered.)
**Gamma Pi**	December 14, 1991	Lycoming College	Williamsport, Pennsylvania	Active	
Gamma Rho	February 8, 1992 – 2024	Seton Hall University	South Orange, New Jersey	Inactive	(Note: Chapter formed from the Little Sisters of Sigma Tau Gamma, established in the 1970s.)
**Gamma Psi**	August 25, 1992 – xxxx ?; September 10, 2025	Fitchburg State University	Fitchburg, Massachusetts	Active	
Gamma Sigma	November 7, 1992 – 1999	Belmont Abbey College	Belmont, North Carolina	Inactive	
**Gamma Tau**	November 14, 1992	Lebanon Valley College	Annville, Pennsylvania	Active	
**Delta Alpha**	April 17, 1993	Gannon University	Erie, Pennsylvania	Active	(Note: Chapter formed from Lambda Delta Pi (local), established in 1986.)
**Gamma Omega**	April 24, 1993	La Salle University	Philadelphia, Pennsylvania	Active	
**Gamma Upsilon**	September 25, 1993	California State University, Los Angeles	Los Angeles, California	Active	
Delta Beta	December 4, 1993 – February 21, 2023	Fairmont State University	Fairmont, West Virginia	Inactive	(Note: Chapter formed from Chi Sigma Nu (local), established before 1993.)
Delta Gamma	February 6, 1994 – 1995	University of North Carolina at Pembroke	Pembroke, North Carolina	Inactive	(Note: Chapter formed from Theta Kappa (local), established in 1969.)
**Delta Epsilon**	November 12, 1994	Marist University	Poughkeepsie, New York	Active	
**Delta Delta**	February 11, 1995	University of Illinois Chicago	Chicago, Illinois	Active	(Note: Chapter formed from Gamma Gamma Gamma (local), established in the 1970s.)
**Delta Zeta**	December 2, 1995	East Stroudsburg University of Pennsylvania	East Stroudsburg, Pennsylvania	Active	(Note: Chapter formed from Phi Kappa Tau (local), established before 1995.)
**Delta Theta**	April 19, 1997	Moravian University	Bethlehem, Pennsylvania	Active	(Note: Chapter formed from Phi Mu Epsilon (local), established in 1912.)
**Delta Eta**	May 3, 1997	Belmont University	Nashville, Tennessee	Active	(Note: Chapter formed from Delta Phi Omega (local), established in 1987.)
Delta Iota	May 17, 1997 – 2024	Johnson & Wales University	Providence, Rhode Island	Inactive	(Note: Chapter formed from Kappa Phi (local), established before 1997.)
Delta Kappa		Nicholls State University	Thibodaux, Louisiana	Never chartered	(Note: This colony operated from 1997 to 2002, but went inactive before being chartered.)
Delta Lambda	September 19, 1998 – 2013	Siena Heights University	Adrian, Michigan	Inactive	(Note: Chapter formed from The Alpha Club (local), established in 1996.)
**Delta Mu**	November 21, 1998 – 2011; November 15, 2015	Cumberland University	Lebanon, Tennessee	Active	
Delta Nu	April 10, 1999 – 2022	Beloit College	Beloit, Wisconsin	Inactive	
Delta Xi		Valparaiso University	Valparaiso, Indiana	Never chartered	(Note: Colony formed from Delta Phi Kappa (local), established in 1986. It operated from 1998 to 2000, but went inactive before being chartered.)
Delta Omicron	May 1, 1999 – 2010	North Carolina Wesleyan College	Rocky Mount, North Carolina	Inactive	(Note: Chapter formed from Sigma Phi Delta (local), established in 1971.)
Delta Rho	April 8, 2000 – 2022	Chowan University	Murfreesboro, North Carolina	Inactive	(Note: Chapter formed from The F.S.C. Club (local), established in 1998.)
**Delta Sigma**	April 15, 2000	Saint Joseph's University	Philadelphia, Pennsylvania	Active	(Note: University of the Sciences merged into Saint Joseph's University in 2022.) (Note: Chapter formed from The U.P.S. Club (local), established in 1998.)
**Delta Pi**	December 2, 2000	Oglethorpe University	Brookhaven, Georgia	Active	
Gamma Phi	January 27, 2001 – 2016	Merrimack College	North Andover, Massachusetts	Inactive	(Note: Chapter formed from Xi Lambda Phi (local), established in 1990.)
**Delta Tau**	August 18, 2001	Oakland University	Oxford, Michigan	Active	(Note: Chapter formed from Alpha Kappa Sigma (local), established in 1991.)
**Delta Upsilon**	November 2, 2002	Saint Leo University	St. Leo, Florida	Active	(Note: Chapter formed from Alpha Sigma (local), established in 1997 to join ΑΣΤ.)
**Delta Phi**	March 27, 2004	New York University	New York City, New York	Active	(Note: Chapter formed from Gamma Delta (local), established in 1979.)
Delta Psi	February 19, 2005 – 2021	Johnson & Wales University, Denver Campus	Denver, Colorado	Inactive	(Note: The Denver and North Miami campuses of Johnson & Wales University closed in 2021.)
Delta Chi	April 30, 2005 – 2012	Christian Brothers University	Memphis, Tennessee	Inactive	(Note: Chapter formed from Gamma Phi (local), established in 1998.)
**Epsilon Alpha**	November 20, 2004	Embry–Riddle Aeronautical University, Prescott	Prescott, Arizona	Active	
**Epsilon Gamma**	May 14, 2005	Georgia Southern University–Armstrong Campus	Savannah, Georgia	Active	
**Epsilon Delta**	November 5, 2005	Rogers State University	Claremore, Oklahoma	Active	
**Epsilon Beta**	November 16, 2005	University of Texas Rio Grande Valley	Edinburg, Texas	Active	
Delta Omega	March 25, 2006 – 2021	Penn State Altoona	Logan Township, Pennsylvania	Inactive	(Note: Chapter formed from Omega Delta (local), established in 1989.)
Epsilon Zeta	April 14, 2007 – 2019	University of Virginia's College at Wise	Wise County, Virginia	Inactive	
Epsilon Epsilon	April 28, 2007 – 2020	Johnson & Wales University, North Miami Campus	North Miami, Florida	Inactive	
**Epsilon Theta**	December 13, 2008	Fairleigh Dickinson University	Teaneck, New Jersey	Active	
**Epsilon Eta**	April 25, 2009	University of the Incarnate Word	San Antonio, Texas	Active	
Epsilon Iota	May 9, 2009 – 2024	New York Institute of Technology	New York City, New York	Inactive	
**Epsilon Kappa**	September 26, 2009	Trine University	Angola, Indiana	Active	(Note: Chapter originated from Alpha Omega Epsilon (local), established in 1999. Not to be confused with Alpha Omega Epsilon, an unrelated engineering and STEM-themed women's sorority.)
**Epsilon Lambda**	January 22, 2011	Indiana University South Bend	South Bend, Indiana	Active	
**Epsilon Mu**	December 3, 2011	University at Buffalo	Buffalo, New York	Active	(Note: Chapter formed as Kappa Phi Epsilon (local), established in 1999.)
**Epsilon Nu**	February 11, 2012	McDaniel College	Westminster, Maryland	Active	(Note: Chapter formed from Alpha Nu Omega (local), established in 1979.)
**Epsilon Xi**	November 11, 2012	Gustavus Adolphus College	St. Peter, Minnesota	Active	
**Epsilon Omicron**	January 13, 2013	University of Southern Indiana	Evansville, Indiana	Active	
**Epsilon Pi**	April 20, 2013	Rhode Island College	Providence, Rhode Island	Active	(Note: Chapter formed from Lambda Chi (local), established before 2013.)
**Epsilon Rho**	April 27, 2013	State University of New York at Geneseo	Geneseo, New York	Active	(Note: Chapter formed from Phi Eta Psi (local), established in 1994.)
**Epsilon Sigma**	May 3, 2014	Bridgewater State University	Bridgewater, Massachusetts	Active	
Epsilon Tau	April 19, 2015 - 2026	Kenyon College	Gambier, Ohio	Inactive	(Note: Chapter formed from Kappa Sigma Alpha (local), established in 2012.)
**Epsilon Upsilon**	April 2, 2016	Dalton State College	Dalton, Georgia	Active	
**Epsilon Phi**	November 13, 2016	Winona State University	Winona, Minnesota	Active	
**Epsilon Chi**	March 25, 2017	University of Minnesota Duluth	Duluth, Minnesota	Active	
**Epsilon Psi**	April 29, 2017	Rowan University	Glassboro, New Jersey	Active	
**Epsilon Omega**	March 8, 2026	Iona University	New Rochelle, New York	Active	
