= Bertrand Rockwell House =

Historic house in Missouri, United States

- U.S. National Register of Historic Places
- Location within Missouri Location within the United States
- Location: 1004 W. 52nd St., Kansas City, Missouri
- Coordinates: 39°2′1″N 94°35′58″W
- Area: less than one acre
- Built: 1908-1909
- Architect: Mary Rockwell Hook
- Architectural style: Late 19th and 20th Century Revivals
- MPS: Residential Structures by Mary Rockwell Hook TR
- NRHP reference No.: 83001018
- Added to NRHP: September 8, 1983

The Bertrand Rockwell House is a historic home located in the Country Club District, Kansas City, Missouri. It was designed by architect Mary Rockwell Hook and built in 1908–1909. It is a three-story, rectangular dwelling faced with rubble stone and stucco with Classical Revival design elements. It features a recessed entry and end porches with Doric order columns. It was built as a residence for her parents, Mr. and Mrs. Bertrand Rockwell.

It was listed on the National Register of Historic Places in 1983.
