= Katherine Pettit =

American educator and suffragist (1868–1936)

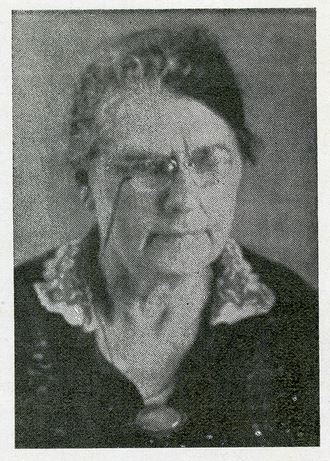
- Born: February 23, 1868; Fayette County, Kentucky, US
- Died: September 3, 1936 (aged 68); Lexington, Kentucky, US
- Occupations: Educator, Writer, Collector of Appalachian customs, plants and artifacts
- Known for: Founder of the nation's first rural settlement school

Katherine Rebecca Pettit (February 23, 1868 – September 3, 1936) was an American educator and suffragist from Kentucky who contributed to the settlement school movement of the early 20th century.

== Background ==
Born to Clara Barbee and Benjamin F. Pettit on a prosperous farm in Fayette County, Kentucky, Pettit attended two years at Sayre School in Lexington. A member of the Woman's Christian Temperance Union, Kentucky Federation of Women's Clubs, and the Daughters of the American Revolution, she became a progressive educator.

== Settlement schools ==
Under the auspices of by the Kentucky Federation of Women's Clubs beginning in 1899, Katherine Pettit and May Stone spent three summers in social settlement work in Kentucky at Camp Cedar Grove, Camp Industrial (which later became the Hindman Settlement School), and Sassafras Social Settlement. Their journals, filled with words to local ballads and idiomatic expressions of their students and families from homes nearby, describe in detail their classes in health and homemaking, as well as teacher training. A local elder Solomon Everage watched the two women—"quare fotched-on women from the level land,"—for some time and eventually asked them to establish a permanent industrial school in the Troublesome Creek area.

=== Hindman Settlement School ===
In 1902 with financing from Frances Beauchamp, president of the Kentucky Woman's Christian Temperance Union, Katherine Pettit and May Stone co-founded Hindman Settlement School in Knott County, Kentucky. Pettit said that the goal of Hindman was "to know all we can and teach all we can." The Kentucky WCTU sponsored the school until 1915, when it was formally incorporated as a private, non-profit, non-sectarian, and non-denominational corporation.

May Stone remained at Hindman as principal until 1936. Many of the graduates remained in the area. Carl D. Perkins, a native of Hindman who served thirty-six years in the United States House of Representatives, was a graduate of the settlement school.

=== Pine Mountain Settlement School ===
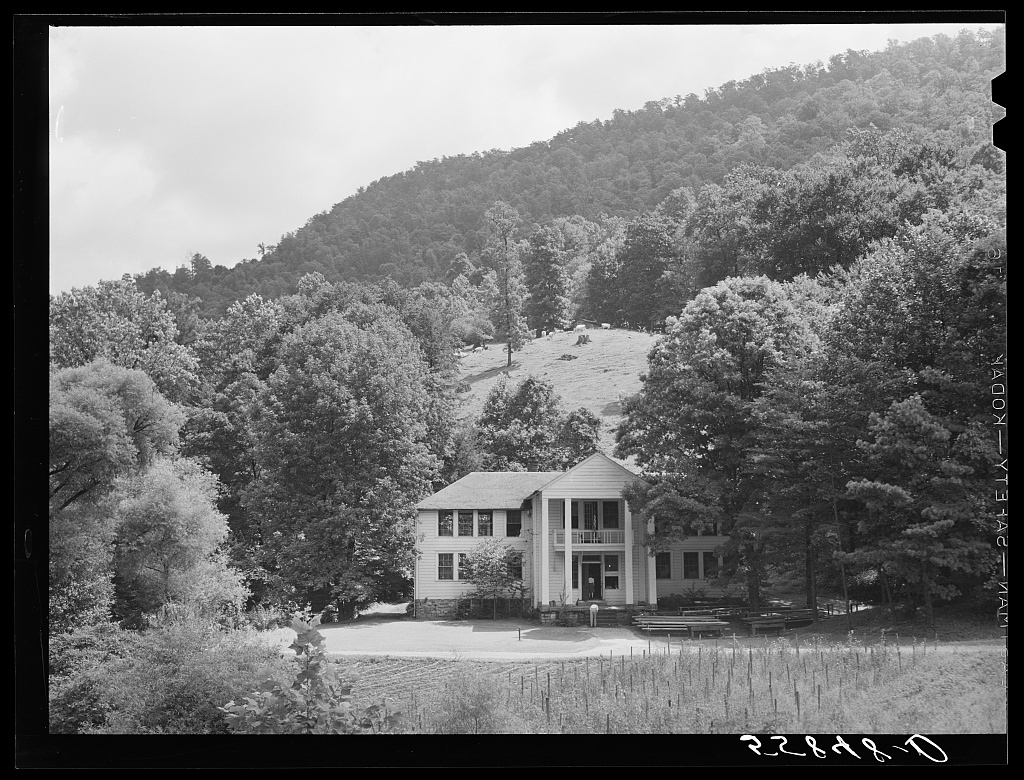
Pine Mountain Settlement School, photographed by Marion Post Wolcott in 1940.

In 1913, Pettit co-founded Pine Mountain Settlement School with Ethel deLong Zande in Harlan County, Kentucky. At Pine Mountain, Pettit directed outdoor work and agricultural education while Zande directed classical academics.

Founding Pine Mountain as an example of the settlement movement, Pettit and deLong modeled the school after Hull House. According to Berea College's Southern Appalachian Archives,

[Pettit and deLong] hoped that their modern ideas about health, nutrition, work efficiency, farm management, and the cultural value of indigenous crafts would permeate the surrounding communities -- both through the children, and through direct contact with adults.

Pine Mountain Settlement School is a National Historic Landmark.

== Support for Woman Suffrage Movement ==
The publications officer for the Kentucky Equal Rights Association, Lida Calvert Obenchain reported to the state convention in 1908 that she sent suffrage literature to the settlement school in Hindman because she considered it a good "field for suffrage work." Obenchain reported:

Miss Katherine Pettit, one of the teachers, is in sympathy with our cause and assures me that she can make use of all the Woman's Journals, copies of Progress and leaflets that I send her, so that these mountain girls and boys can hear the gospel of equal rights while they are growing up and will need no conversion in later life. I have also sent to this school the peace literature sent me by the Superintendent of this branch of work.

In 1914, despite the antipathy for women's involvement in eastern Kentucky politics, Pettit was elected as a public school trustee in Harlan County, Kentucky.

Pettit's activism in electoral politics and her support for women's right to vote clearly had an impact on her students. Even after she had left Hindman to work at Pine Mountain, the students in Hindman continued to focus on this volatile issue. Evelyn K. Wells, school secretary at Pine Mountain, visited Hindman Settlement School in 1918 and wrote about hearing the students working on their ideas about suffrage: "In the evening various clubs held forth. I visited debating and heard a most vigorous debate on woman suffrage..."

== Appalachian culture ==
Katherine Pettit labored to preserve and encourage the teaching of Appalachian culture through arts, folk songs, and customs. One of her hobbies was collecting quilts (several of which are now displayed in the Bodley-Bullock House in the Gratz Park Historic District), as well as the folk tales and ballads of the region. Her diaries provide much detail about Appalachian culture at the beginning of the 20th century.

Her teachings on natural vegetable dyeing were recorded in The Katherine Pettit Book of Vegetable Dyes. Wilmer Stone Viner, who had worked at Pine Mountain Settlement School, published this in 1946 after moving from Kentucky to Saluda, North Carolina. Consequently, Pettit's recipes have influenced craft practices in western North Carolina. The book, dedicated to the memory of Katherine Pettit, quotes a memorial tablet in the Pine Mountain Settlement School Chapel:

Katherine Pettit, 1869 - 1936, pioneer and trail-breaker. Forty years she spent creating opportunity for mountain children here and elsewhere. In life, she ever refused praise. In death, she is too great for it.

== Death ==
Whenever she visited her sister Minnie Pettit Bullock in Lexington, she lived in the garden apartment behind the house in the Gratz Park Historic District. She died of cancer there in 1936, and is buried in the Lexington Cemetery.
