= Four Gates Farm =

Historic house in Missouri, United States

- U.S. National Register of Historic Places
- U.S. Historic district
- Location within Missouri Location within the United States
- Location: 13001 Little Blue Rd., Kansas City, Missouri
- Coordinates: 38°59′52″N 94°25′46″W
- Area: 40 acres (16 ha)
- Built: 1925
- Architect: Mary Rockwell Hook
- MPS: Residential Structures by Mary Rockwell Hook TR
- NRHP reference No.: 83004871
- Added to NRHP: July 15, 1991

The Four Gates Farm, also known as Oak Hill Farm, is a historic home and national historic district located at 13001 Little Blue Rd. in Kansas City, Missouri. The district encompasses two contributing buildings and four contributing structures. The main house was designed by architect Mary Rockwell Hook in 1925, and is a three-story brick and rubble masonry dwelling. It consists of a rectangular main section with flanking wings and features decks, balconies, projecting one-story porches, and an engaged conical roof over a doorway. Other contributing resources are a small stone farmhouse, a free standing conical roofed stone tower, and three stone outbuildings.

It was listed on the National Register of Historic Places in 1991.
