= Luigi Zande =

Italian-American stonemason and educator (1887–1957)

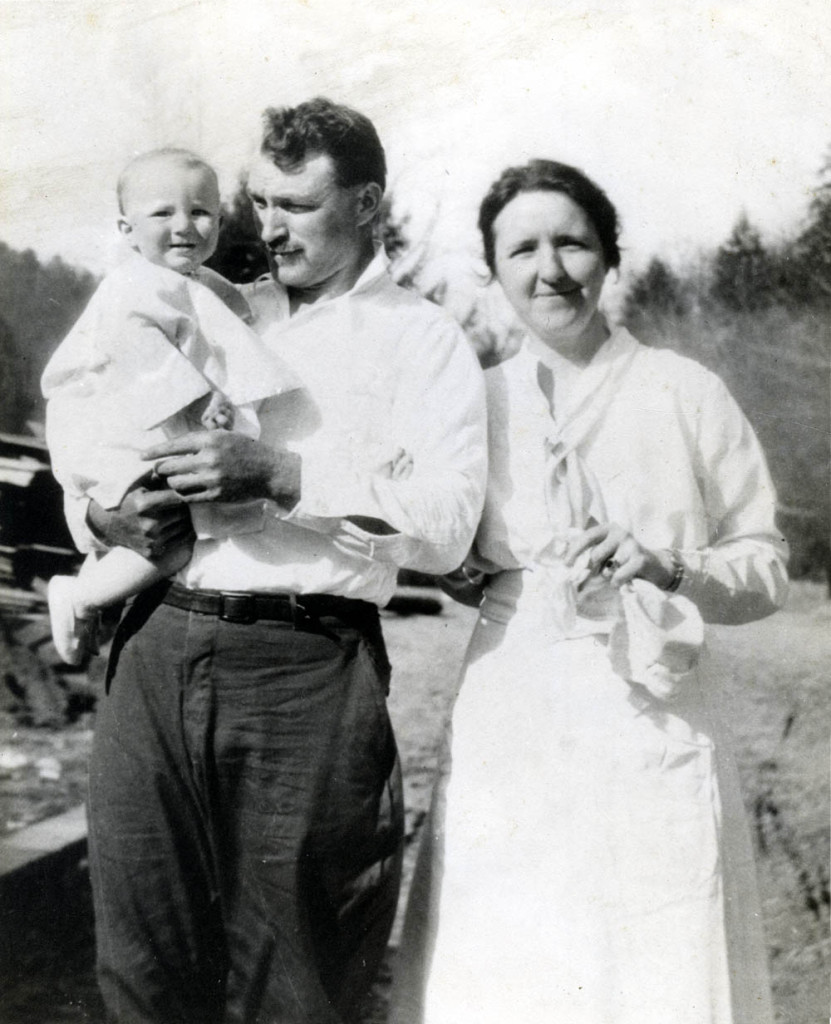
- Luigi Zande with his wife Ethel and son Alberto, c. 1919
- Born: Luigi Zandegiacomo; March 11, 1887; Auronzo di Cadore, Italy
- Died: December 13, 1957 (aged 70); Asheville, North Carolina, U.S.
- Spouse(s): Ethel de Long (m. 1918–1928); Caroline Heinz (m. 1930–1957)
- Children: 2

Luigi Zande (March 11, 1887 – December 13, 1957) was an Italian-American stonemason, educator, and builder who contributed to the settlement school movement of the early 20th century. He is best known for his contributions to Pine Mountain Settlement School.

== Biography ==
Luigi Zande was born on March 11, 1887, in Auronzo di Cadore, Italy. In the early 1900s, he arrived in the United States as Luigi Zandegiacomo, which he changed to Luigi Zande.

Zande may have been one of several Italian stonemasons recruited by the U.S. Coal and Coke Company to build the foundations for Lynch, Kentucky's tipple and mine offices.

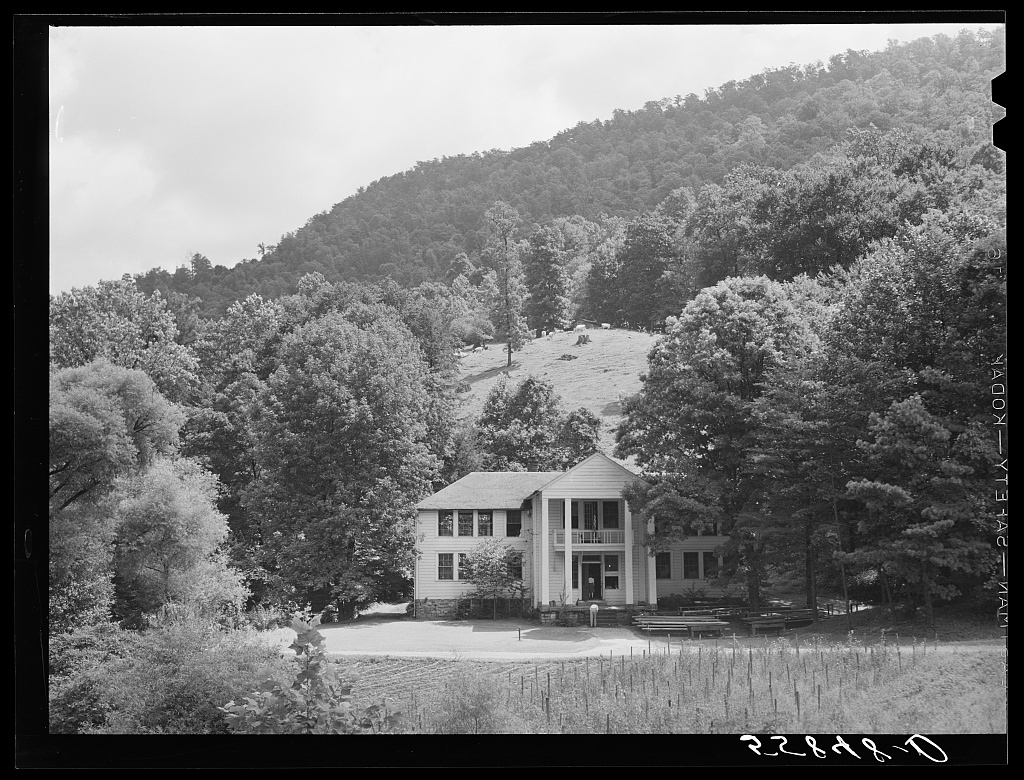
Pine Mountain Settlement School, photographed by Marion Post Wolcott in 1940

In 1914, Zande was brought to Pine Mountain Settlement School to construct the schools stone reservoir. He also helped to build the chapel at the school. After the schools completion, Zande stayed at the school teaching stone masonry to people in the area and helping to construct many buildings located on the schools campus.

Zande gained full U.S. citizenship in 1917. On April 10, 1918, he married Ethel de Long, co-founder of Pine Mountain Settlement School. The couple had two children, Alberto, born in 1919, and Elena, who they adopted in 1923.

Zande built a cottage at the school for him and his family to live in, which came to be known as the Zande House and is still in use at the school today.

Zande sold his home to the school in May 1928, three months after the death of his wife, Ethel. He left Kentucky in late June 1928, and spent the next several months in Wilmington, Delaware, possibly with family members.

In October 1928, Zande left Wilmington and moved to Asheville, North Carolina, where he started a job with the American Enka Company. He also worked as a civil engineer and builder, using the skills he honed while at Pine Mountain.

In 1930, Zande married Caroline Heinz, a former secretary and housemother at Pine Mountain Settlement School.

Zande died on December 13, 1957, in Asheville, North Carolina.

In 1991, Pine Mountain Settlement School was added to the National Register of Historic Places. Zande is listed along with Mary Rockwell Hook, as the architect and builder of the school.
