= Robert Ostertag House =

Historic house in Missouri, United States

- U.S. National Register of Historic Places
- Location within Missouri Location within the United States
- Location: 5030 Sunset Dr., Kansas City, Missouri
- Coordinates: 39°2′10″N 94°35′48″W
- Area: less than one acre
- Built: 1922
- Built by: Matthias Raab
- Architect: Mary Rockwell Hook
- MPS: Residential Structures by Mary Rockwell Hook TR
- NRHP reference No.: 83001014
- Added to NRHP: September 8, 1983

The Robert Ostertag House is a historic home located in the Country Club District, Kansas City, Missouri It was designed by architect Mary Rockwell Hook and built in 1922 for $15,000 for Robert A. Ostertag, president of a tin can company. It is a T-shaped dwelling faced with stucco.

It was listed on the National Register of Historic Places in 1983.
