= May Stone (educator) =

American educator (1867–1946)

- Born: May 1, 1867; Owingsville, Kentucky
- Died: 1946 (aged 77–78)
- Education: Wellesley College
- Occupation: Educator

May Stone (May 1, 1867 – January 29, 1946) was an American educator and administrator from Kentucky who contributed to the settlement school movement of the early 20th century.

== Background ==
Stone was born in Owingsville, Kentucky, to Henry L. and Pamela (Bourne) Stone. Due to her family's affluence, she attended private secondary schools in Owingsville and Mt. Sterling, then went on to study German at Wellesley College. After leaving Wellesley in 1887, she returned to Kentucky, where she became active in the Louisville chapters of the Daughters of the American Revolution and the Federation of Women's Clubs and served as the secretary of the Kentucky Federation of Women's Clubs.

== Hindman Settlement School ==
Stone met Katherine Pettit through the Federation of Women's Clubs in 1899. With Pettit, Stone spent three summers conducting a series of schools for the Federation near Hazard and Hindman, Kentucky, from 1899 to 1901. Local man Solomon Everage asked the two women to establish a school in the Troublesome Creek area, and, in 1902, with financing from the Women's Christian Temperance Union, Stone and Pettit co-founded Hindman Settlement School in Knott County, Kentucky.

Stone was responsible for much of the administrative and financial work at the Hindman School and may have made many of the financial decisions at the school, or at least calculated the financial costs of new programs and activities. In 1912, Pettit left to found Pine Mountain Settlement School, but Stone remained on as principal. Under her leadership, the Hindman School taught courses in traditional academic subjects and industrial arts. Teachers offered medical clinics and helped improve other rural schools in Knott County. During the Depression, Stone even used her own wealth to keep the school functioning.

Stone had a great interest in mountain handicrafts, collecting "coverlids" (coverlets), and was an expert in genealogy. She often told the local people around Hindman about how she could trace their relationships with each other.

== Other service ==
Throughout her lifetime, Stone belonged to the Daughters of the War of 1812, the Daughters of the Confederacy, the Transylvanians, the Historical Societies of Virginia and Kentucky, the Filson Club of Louisville, the Daughters of the American Revolution, and the Kentucky Federation of Women's Clubs. With Pettit, she helped found the Conference of Southern Mountain Workers and served on the board of the Frontier Nursing Service. She was also a founding member of the Southern Handicrafts Guild.

== Later life ==
Although Stone remained principal of the Hindman Settlement School until 1936, she relied heavily on other staff members, especially assistant director Elizabeth Watts, after 1920. By 1924, she had only returned to Hindman during the summers. After she retired in 1936, she remained on the board of directors until her death in 1946. She was buried in the Lexington Cemetery.
