= Emily Rockwell Love House =

Historic house in Missouri, United States

- U.S. National Register of Historic Places
- Location within Missouri Location within the United States
- Location: 5029 Sunset Drive, Kansas City, Missouri
- Coordinates: 39°2′8″N 94°35′51″W
- Area: less than one acre
- Built: 1915
- Architect: Mary Rockwell Hook
- MPS: Residential Structures by Mary Rockwell Hook TR
- NRHP reference No.: 83001010
- Added to NRHP: September 8, 1983

The Emily Rockwell Love House is a historic home located in the Country Club District of Kansas City, Missouri. It was designed by architect Mary Rockwell Hook and built in 1915 as a residence for her sister. It is built on a slope, the house includes three levels. Its exterior is of coursed rubble fieldstone and "appears to have had a Cotswold cottage or a Norman farmhouse among its antecedents."

It was listed in the National Register of Historic Places in 2003.
