= House at 5011 Sunset Drive =

Historic house in Missouri, United States

- U.S. National Register of Historic Places
- Location within Missouri Location within the United States
- Location: 5011 Sunset Dr., Kansas City, Missouri
- Coordinates: 39°1′49″N 94°35′7″W
- Area: less than one acre
- Built: 1922-1923
- Architect: Mary Rockwell Hook
- Architectural style: Bungalow/Craftsman
- MPS: Residential Structures by Mary Rockwell Hook TR
- NRHP reference No.: 83001006
- Added to NRHP: September 8, 1983

House at 5011 Sunset Drive

The House at 5011 Sunset Drive is a historic home located in the Country Club District, Kansas City, Missouri. It was designed by architect Mary Rockwell Hook and was built in 1922–1923. It is a three-story, "L"-plan, Bungalow / American Craftsman style stone veneered dwelling with a two-story wing. It features an overhanging hipped roof with heavily bracketed eaves and an "outdoor living room".

It was listed on the National Register of Historic Places in 1983.
