= House at 54 E. 53rd Terrace =

Historic house in Missouri, United States

- U.S. National Register of Historic Places
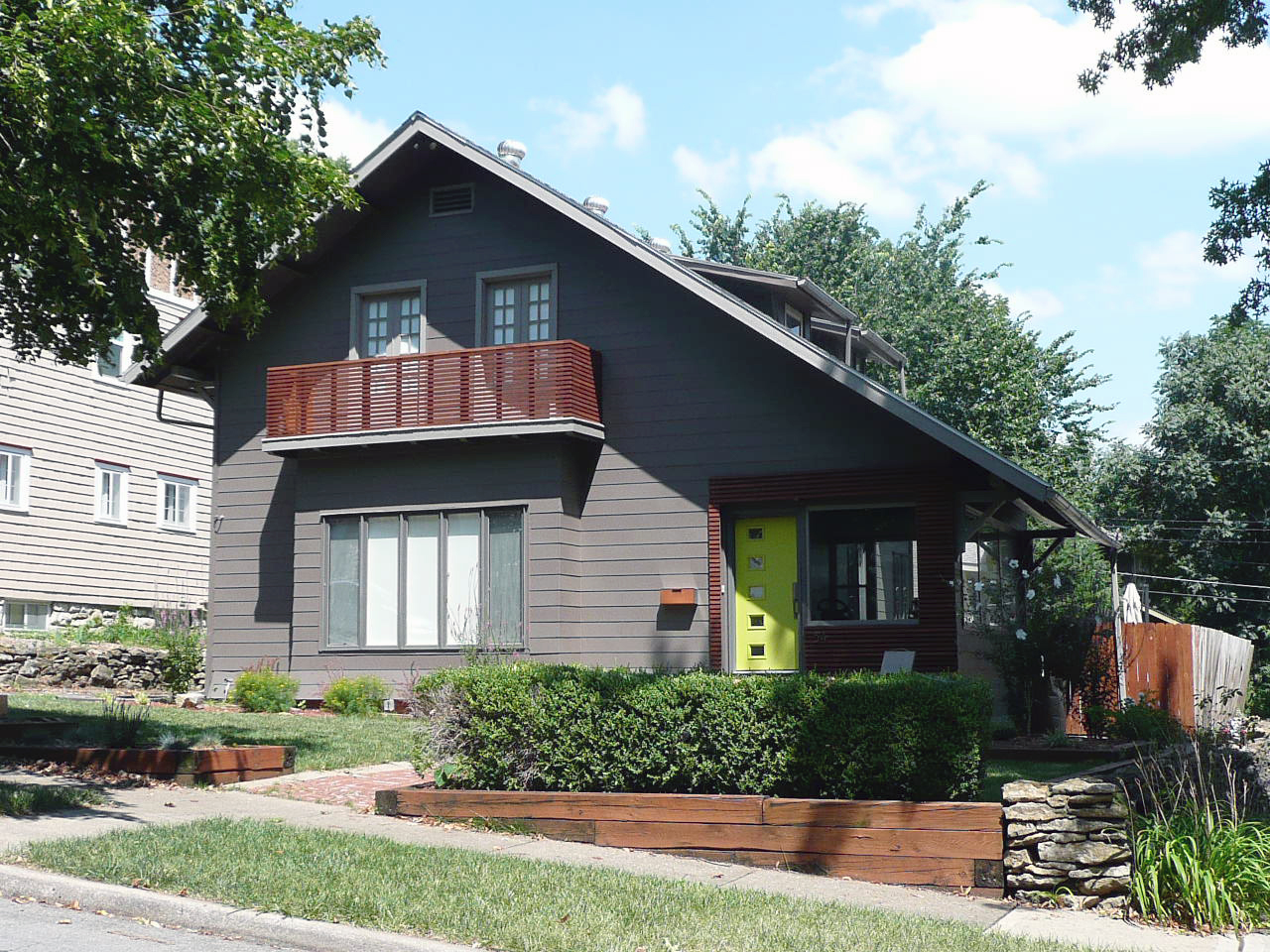

- Location within Missouri Location within the United States
- Location: 54 E. 53rd Terr., Kansas City, Missouri
- Coordinates: 39°2′14″N 94°35′48″W
- Area: less than one acre
- Built: 1908
- Architect: Mary Rockwell Hook
- MPS: Residential Structures by Mary Rockwell Hook TR
- NRHP reference No.: 83001007
- Added to NRHP: September 8, 1983

The House at 54 E. 53rd Terrace is a historic home located at Kansas City, Missouri. It was designed by architect Mary Rockwell Hook and built in 1908. It is a two-story, compact, rectangular frame dwelling with an asymmetrical roof. The front facade features a narrow balcony. The house includes an interior mural by her sister Bertha.

It was listed on the National Register of Historic Places in 1983.
