= Eliza Hall Kendrick =

American professor

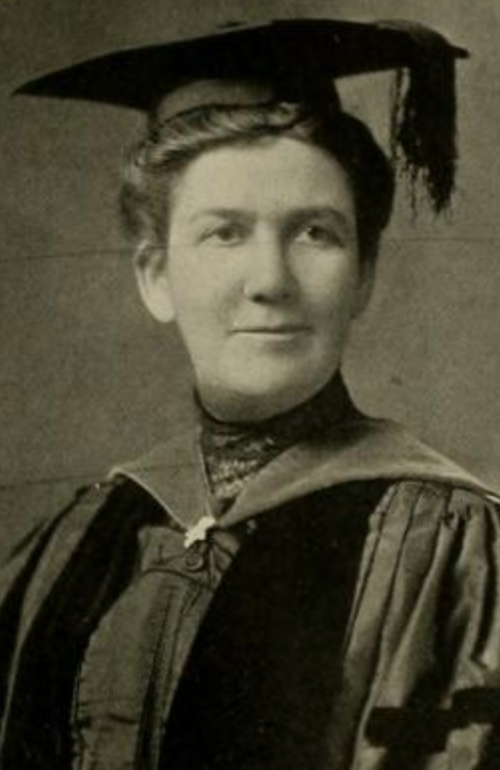
- Eliza Hall Kendrick, from the 1914 yearbook of Wellesley College
- Born: March 14, 1863; Nashua, New Hampshire
- Died: April 11, 1940 (aged 77); Coconut Grove, Florida
- Occupation: College professor

Eliza Hall Kendrick (March 14, 1863 – April 11, 1940) was an American college professor. She taught Biblical history at Wellesley College from 1899 to 1931. She was active in ecumenical efforts both internationally and in New England.

== Early life and education ==
Eliza "Lida" Kendrick was born in Nashua, New Hampshire, the daughter of Benjamin Franklin Kendrick and Clarissa Dodge Kendrick. Her father worked for the railroad. She graduated from Wellesley College in 1885, and completed doctoral studies at Boston University in 1895. Her younger brother Arthur Kendrick became a physicist.

== Career ==
Kendrick taught Latin and Greek at the Lasell Female Seminary, and at Granville College in Ohio, as a young woman. She was an instructor at Wellesley College beginning in 1899, and was a professor of Biblical history there from 1906 to 1931; she held full professor status beginning in 1909. She helped to organize the National Association of Biblical Instructors in 1906, and served as president of the organization in 1926 and 1927.

Kendrick was a member of the executive council of the Society of Biblical Literature and Exegesis. She served on the managing committee of the American School in Jerusalem. She lectured at Yenching College in Hong Kong during the 1922–1923 academic year, and was a trustee of the Women's College at Yenching.

Kendrick attended the World Conference of Life and Work in Stockholm in 1925, and represented the Council of Congregational Churches at a similar ecumenical conference in Lausanne in 1927. Continuing that work, she was a member of the program committee for the New England Conference on Church Unity in 1928.

== Publications ==
- A Guide to the Study of the Development of Thought in the New Testament (1914)
- A book of Psalms arranged for use in a college chapel (1934)
- History of Bible Teaching at Wellesley College, 1875 –1950 (1950, published posthumously)

== Personal life ==
Kendrick shared a house with her younger cousin Evelyn Kendrick Wells, who also taught at Wellesley College. She died in 1940, in Coconut Grove, Florida, at the age of 77. She left her home to Wellesley College.
