= Mary Rockwell Hook =

American architect (1877–1978)

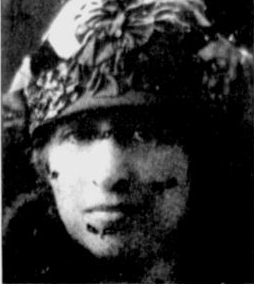
- Born: September 8, 1877; Junction City, Kansas
- Died: September 8, 1978 (aged 101); Siesta Key, Florida, U.S.
- Education: Wellesley College; Art Institute of Chicago
- Occupation: Architect
- Practice: Mary Rockwell, Mary Rockwell Hook, Hook and Remington
- Projects: Pine Mountain Settlement School

Mary Rockwell Hook (September 8, 1877 – September 8, 1978) was an American architect and a pioneer for women in architecture. She worked principally from Kansas City, Missouri but designed throughout the United States. She was denied admission to the American Institute of Architects (AIA) due to her gender.

However, she did obtain recognition for her work, including by the AIA, later, on her 100th birthday. And according to an article in the newsletter of the International Archive of Women in Architecture, "Mary Rockwell Hook will be remembered, not because she was a woman working in a 'man's field,' but because she was a successful designer who made her mark in the field of architecture." Between 1910–30, there were actually five women who worked as architects in the Kansas City area. Hook was the only one to achieve any wider recognition.

== Background ==
=== Personal life ===
Born in Junction City, Kansas, Mary was the third of five daughters of Bertrand Rockwell (1844-1930), a captain of the Union Army in the American Civil War and successful grain merchant and banker, and Julia Marshall Snyder (1850-1947), who was the first historian for the parish known today as Grace and Holy Trinity Cathedral of the Episcopal Diocese of West Missouri. During Mary's childhood, the Rockwell family moved extensively throughout Europe. In 1906, the Rockwell family moved to Kansas City, Missouri. Mary Rockwell married Inghram D. Hook (1883-1973), an attorney, in 1921. Her marriage put an end to her architectural career for two years, until she worked up the courage to ask her husband "if he had any objection to [her] doing architecture professionally. When [she] finally asked him, he said, 'Certainly not, go ahead.'" The couple adopted two boys, Eugene and Edward.

Mary Rockwell Hook died on her 101st birthday at her home on Siesta Key, an island off the coast of Sarasota, Florida.

=== Education ===
Mary Rockwell was educated in the Dana Hall School, a preparatory school for girls in Wellesley, Massachusetts. Afterwards, she attended Wellesley College, which she graduated from in 1900. According to her autobiography, she decided to become an architect after a 1902 family trip abroad:

It was during this trip home from the Philippines that I decided someone needed to improve the design of the buildings used by our government abroad. I made up my mind to go home and study architecture.

In 1903, she enrolled as the only woman in her class in the architecture department at the Art Institute of Chicago.

=== Gender discrimination ===
In 1905, Rockwell went to Paris to study in the atelier of Marcel Auburtin, an admirer of her sister Kitty, as a prerequisite for being admitted at the École des Beaux-Arts. As a female student in a predominantly male school, Rockwell (Hook) faced gender discrimination. While preparing for her entrance examinations in the Ecole des Beaux-Arts, she learned that she was only the second woman to ever take the exam. In 1906, after her entrance examinations at the École des Beaux-Arts, French male students intended to fling buckets of water at her as she fled through the courtyard. She did not pass the exam nor repeated it as other students did and thus did not study at the Ecole des Beaux-Arts. Instead, she explored French architecture on bicycle trips with her sister. The Kansas City Star later wrote that the era was one "when male architects were openly antagonistic to women joining the profession."

Discrimination did not end with her training. When she applied for her first job in an architecture office in Kansas City, she was rejected because "you can't swear at women and they can't climb all over full sized details." However, the next firm gladly employed her, although without a salary because her father did not allow her to be paid.

The American Institute of Architects (AIA) denied Hook's membership because of her gender. Upon her 100th birthday in 1977, however, the professional organization presented her with a plaque for distinguished service. (At that point, she was totally blind and unable to see the award.) Kansas City residents further celebrated the occasion by touring famous homes that she had designed locally.

== Career and impact ==
=== Early Struggles ===
When Hook first began seeking employment with an architectural firm, her father gave her his blessing but also insisted that she receive no salary for her work. The first firm she approached, Wight and Wight, told her that they could not hire a woman. Thomas Wight is reported as saying, "You can't swear at women and they can't climb all over full-sized details." Next, Hook approached the firm Howe, Hoit, and Custer, where she was offered the position of drafter. She would continue to work for this firm for the next several years.

=== Pine Mountain Settlement School ===
Around 1913, when Katherine Pettit and Ethel De Long Zande were preparing for the foundation of Pine Mountain Settlement School in the Appalachian Mountains, Ethel wrote Mary Rockwell asking her to plan its campus. By then, she had successfully designed several houses. Hook later described Pine Mountain as "an 18th-century world" where "there is no village to mar the peaceful landscape, where trains, motors, and chewing gum have not penetrated."

After studying the area, the three agreed that lower lands should be used for farming to feed the students while steeper lands would be used for construction. Public buildings would be central, and cottages would line the edges of the valley.

Rockwell's (later Hook) first project for the campus construction was the renovation of a dilapidated log cabin called Old Log House. She next designed a log house for Pettit. Hook worked with local resources in her designs, including chestnut, poplar, oak, and boulders. Even though a mill was installed on campus, it took more than a year to cut and dry lumber for Laurel House, the school's dining hall.

Hook remained involved with the school as a member of the Board of Trustees until she was over 90 years old. Pine Mountain Settlement School is listed on the National Register of Historic Places and is now a National Historic Landmark.

==== Buildings at Pine Mountain School ====
Undated:
Science Building with Printshop and Workshop
"Open House" for Mary Rockwell, Ethel McCullough, and Margaret Butler.

1914:
Old Log House Restoration
Miss Pettit's House
Laurel House

1919:
Office

1922-24:
Chapel

1940:
Replacement of Laurel House after a fire.

=== Hook and Remington ===
In 1923, Hook returned to Kansas City and started the Hook and Remington architectural firm with partner Eric Douglas Macwilliam Remington (1893-1975). They worked together until 1932 when Remington settled in San Francisco.

=== White House ===
Despite blindness in her later years, Hook imagined designs and offered ideas to modify the White House and other buildings.

=== Architectural style ===
==== Kansas City ====
Hook's Kansas City designs date from as early as 1908, with her most eminent work completed during the 1920s and 1930s in the Sunset Hills area. The first home she designed was for her parents, and was a mixture of classical revival designs and was equipped with an attached garage, reportedly the first one built in the Kansas City area. Many of her designs in Sunset Hills pay tribute to the architectural styles she witnessed during childhood trips to Europe and East Asia. Hook's Italianate architecture was evidenced by her synthesis of brick, stone, and antique materials with tiles, frescoes, and leaded panes. Hook's own home, which she designed in 1925, is one example of an Italianate residence. Nine of Hook's works in Kansas City were studied in a National Register of Historic Places "Thematic Resources" study and were listed on the National Register with extensive descriptions and analysis.

==== Works in Kansas City on the National Register include ====
1. House at 54 E. 53rd Terrace, 54 E. 53rd Terr., Kansas City, Missouri, 1908
2. Bertrand Rockwell House, 1004 W. 52nd St., Kansas City, Missouri, 1908–09
3. Emily Rockwell Love House, 5029 Sunset Dr., Kansas City, Missouri, 1915
4. Robert Ostertag House, 5030 Summit St., Kansas City, Missouri, 1922
5. "Pink House", 5012 Summit St., Kansas City, Missouri, 1922
6. House at 5011 Sunset Drive, 5011 Sunset Dr., Kansas City, Missouri, 1922–23
7. Floyd Jacobs House, 5050 Sunset Dr., Kansas City, Missouri, 1925
8. Mary Rockwell Hook House, 4940 Summit St., Kansas City, Missouri, 1925–27
9. Four Gates Farm / Marvin Gates Residence, at 13001 Little Blue Road, RFD #3, Kansas City, Missouri, 1925–27

Many of Hook's early houses were commissioned for members of her family. She later also received several commissions from non-family members.

==== California ====
While the Rockwell family traveled widely for the enrichment of their daughters' education, Bertrand Rockwell sought the mild climate of Northern California to improve his health on the advice of his brother-in-law, a medical doctor in Santa Rosa. There, Mary's sister Florence met and married James Edwards. Around 1908, Mary built a house for them in Santa Rosa. The asymmetrical house was designed in the First Bay Area Tradition. For many years, the architect of the house was unknown and assumed to be Julia Morgan or Brainerd Jones of Petaluma. The house is listed under the name of the second owner as the Wasserman House on the National Register of Historic Places.

However, the listing does not include the well-documented findings of architectural historian Jeffrey Elliott such as the names of the first owners, James and Florence Edwards, nor the architect's name, Mary Rockwell (Hook). The house was transformed into an office building with careful attention to the original design.

The second house in California was designed at the height of her career in 1926 as an impressive French mansion called "Le Soleil" for Francis and Katherine Crosby in Woodside, an hour south of San Francisco. Francis Crosby was the president of the Key System transportation service and owner of several small telephone companies. The design of "Le Soleil" was a collaboration of three Rockwell sisters: Mary Rockwell Hook and her partner Eric Douglas Remington were the architects; Katherine Rockwell Crosby, the owner, designed the interior, acquired the furniture and designed the French gardens, and Bertha Rockwell Venanzi, an artist living in Italy, painted floral murals in the grand ballroom. The estate has many formal rooms for entertaining with requisite kitchen and cellar rooms, a total of seven bedroom suites, and a garage for nine cars, all on a large property of several beautifully landscaped acres with a pool and tennis court.

==== Works in California ====
1908 James and Florence Edwards House, 930 Mendocino Avenue, Santa Rosa, also known as the Wasserman House;

1926 Francis and Katherine Crosby House "Le Soleil", 320 Harcross Road, Woodside.

==== Siesta Key ====
After purchasing 55 acres (220,000 m^{2}) of Gulf-front property on Siesta Key, Florida in 1935, Hook developed part of the area with her designs. In Whispering Sands, she designed a resort hotel and vacation homes as a sanctuary for writers and artists. Another subdivision called Sandy Hook was intended to be a residential area for architects and incubator for the Sarasota School of Architecture. In 1952, Hook developed another area called Sandy Cove and designed her own octagon-shaped home where she spent the last years of her life.

==== Works on Siesta Key ====
1936 and later:
Whispering Sands: Resort Hotel, Glass House for guests, two vacation houses, house for her family

1945:
Whispering Sands: House for Hook's son Dick and his family

1945
Sandy Hook: House by Hook for herself and her husband, Plans for a small architectural school (never realized)
Houses designed by other architects, mostly from the Sarasota School of Architecture (such as Paul Rudolph)

1952 and later:
Sandy Cove: 12-acre development with 113 homes
Two winter cottages off Ocean Boulevard
Hook's own octagon-shaped home where she died.

=== Architectural innovations ===
==== Employing natural terrain ====
Mary Rockwell Hook was the first Kansas City architect to incorporate natural formations in her designs. When she continued this style on Siesta Key, local newspaper Sarasota Herald-Tribune described Hook as "bringing the outdoors in, and many of the homes she designed on Siesta Key reflected the trend long before it became popular."

==== Solar energy ====
In Siesta Key, Hook used solar power to heat water for the resort hotel Whispering Sands as early as 1937.

==== Other firsts ====
Mary Rockwell Hook was the first architect in Kansas City to use cast-in-place concrete walls. Additionally, one of her house designs was the first in Kansas City to include a private swimming pool, while another was the first to have an attached garage. She used salvaged materials in her designs, such as, for example, marble tiles salvaged from a Topeka, Kansas hotel.

== See also ==
- Women in architecture
