= Richard Zander (anatomist) =

German anatomist (1855–1918)

Richard Zander (18 July 1855, Königsberg – 28 October 1918, Königsberg) was a German anatomist. He was the father of surgeon Paul Zander (1884–1955).

From 1876 he studied medicine at the University of Königsberg, where his influences were Karl Wilhelm von Kupffer and Ernst Neumann. He received his medical doctorate in 1881 and worked as an assistant at the institute of pathology in Halle and at the anatomical institute in Königsberg. In 1884 he obtained his habilitation for anatomy and in 1892 became an associate professor. In 1912 he was named an honorary full professor of anatomy at the University of Königsberg. Until women were allowed to study medicine at the university, he conducted lectures for female students at the Institute of Anatomy. He also gave lectures at the Academy of Art.

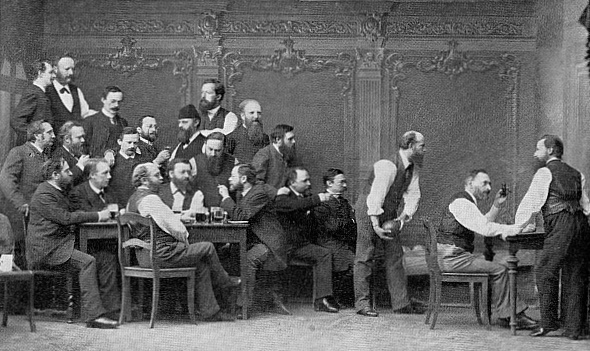
Kegelabend of the Vereins für wissenschaftliche Heilkunde (University of Königsberg). Zander is the standing figure at the far right.

== Selected works ==
- Die frühesten Stadien der Nagelentwickelung und ihre Beziehungen zu den Digitalnerven, (1884) – The earliest stages of nail development and its correlation with the digital nerves.
- Experimentelles zur Entscheidung der Frage über den Zusammenhang von chronischer diffuser Nephritis und Hypertrophie des linken Ventrikels, (1888) – Experiments to decide the question on the relationship of chronic diffuse nephritis and hypertrophy of the left ventricle.
- Beiträge zur Kenntnis der Hautnerven des Kopfes, (1897) – Contributions to the knowledge of cutaneous nerves of the head.
- Die Bedeutung der körperlichen Uebungen für die Entwicklung des Körpers und für die Gesundheit, (1897) – The importance of physical exercises for the development of the body and for health.
- Die leibesübungen und ihre Bedeutung für die gesundheit (1900) – Physical exercises and their relationship to health.
- Vom Nervensystem, seine Bau und seiner Bedeutung für Leib und Seele im gesunden und Kranken Zustande. (Leipzig, Teubner, 1903) – The nervous system, its construction and its importance for body and soul, etc.
- Anatomie des Nervensystems (edited with Theodor Ziehen, 1903) in: "Handbuch der Anatomie des Menschen" – Anatomy of the nervous system.
