= Pi Alpha Tau =

American Jewish women's sorority (1917–1950)

- ΠΑΤ
- Founded: October 1918; 107 years ago Hunter College
- Type: Social
- Affiliation: Independent
- Status: Defunct
- Defunct date: 1960
- Successor: Scattered
- Emphasis: Jewish
- Scope: National (US)
- Member badge
- Symbol: Nine stars, a Tower
- Publication: Pi Alpha Tau Quarterly
- Chapters: 12
- Headquarters: United States

Pi Alpha Tau (ΠΑΤ) sorority was a national, Jewish women's sorority operating in the United States between, approximately, 1917 and 1950.

== History ==
Pi Alpha Tau sorority was established for Jewish women at Hunter College, a unit of the City University of New York. The exact founding date of the sorority is uncertain: The Oracle of Adelphi College (1937) gave the date as 1917, while the 1929 edition of The Oracle gives it as October 1918; Baird's Manual of American College Fraternities, 14th ed., (1940), claimed 1918. Regardless, Pi Alpha Tau grew slowly and steadily into a national organization.

According to the 1937 Oracle, a group of girls created the new sorority on the Hunter College campus, remarking, "Sorority life was so congenial and agreeable to these modern pioneers that their associates in other college[s] were encouraged to follow the Greek letter path." Pi Alpha Tau established chapters at schools in the New York City metropolitan area, soon in Albany, and by 1924 opened its first chapter outside of the state, in New Jersey.

Further expansion outside of the New York area brought chapters at Cincinnati and Wisconsin, eventually marking a total of twelve chapters, all within the US.

The Great Depression, World War II, and the gradual Jewish integration into non-Jewish national organizations took their toll: By 1950, Pi Alpha Tau ceased to operate as a national organization. Circumstances of its dissolution are unknown; three chapters appear to have survived into the 1950s. The two youngest chapters, Lambda at CUNY, Brooklyn and Mu at Syracuse withdrew by 1957 or earlier to operate as locals, later creating a two-chapter sorority called Sigma Tau Delta; they opted to merge into Alpha Sigma Tau in 1960. The Alpha chapter survived as a de facto local for over a decade, still under the name Pi Alpha Tau, opting to become a chapter of Sigma Delta Tau in 1960.

== Symbols ==
The Pi Alpha Tau membership badge was a black enamel shield surrounded by jewels. The Greek letters, in gold, were inscribed vertically on the shield. A jewel was between the enamel and the surrounding jewel photo. Its pledge pin was a diamond divided in half horizontally into two equilateral triangles. The top half being dark colored, the bottom light colored.

The sorority's values, to be inferred from the Oracle article, were "high standards of scholarship and fraternity".

== Chapter list ==
Following is a list of the chapters of Pi Alpha Tau.

Chapter	Charter date and range	Institution	Location	Status	Ref.
Alpha	October 1918 – 1960	Hunter College	New York City, New York	Withdrew (ΣΔΤ)	(Note: Became Alpha Sigma chapter of Sigma Delta Tau.)
Beta	1920–192x ?	New York University	New York City, New York	Inactive	
Gamma	December 1918 – 1938	Adelphi College	Garden City, New York	Inactive	
Delta	1920–192x ?	Brooklyn Law School	Brooklyn, New York	Inactive	(Note: While the Adelphi Oracle yearbook of 1929 notes the Delta chapter at St. Lawrence University, it wasn't shown in the St. Lawrence yearbooks. The matter is clarified by the 1937 edition of the Oracle, showing the group was actually located at St. Lawrence's Brooklyn Law School, in Brooklyn, NY. The law school separated from St. Lawrence in 1943 and now operates independently.)
Epsilon	1925–1942	University at Albany, SUNY	Albany, New York	Inactive	(Note: Until 1961, the school was known as SUNY College of Education at Albany) (Note: Epsilon chapter originated in 1923 as a colony or local.)
Zeta	1924–19xx ?	Rutgers Law School	Newark, New Jersey	Inactive	(Note: Until 1946 and its merger into Rutgers, this school was named the New Jersey Law College.)
Eta	1927–1941	University of Cincinnati	Cincinnati, Ohio	Inactive	
Theta	1929–193x ?	LIU Brooklyn	Brooklyn, New York	Inactive	(Note: The school was named Long Island University during the time it hosted a chapter of ΠΑΤ. After several name changes, it was finally renamed LIU Brooklyn in 2012.)
Iota	1929–1933	University of Wisconsin–Madison	Madison, Wisconsin	Inactive	
Kappa	1929–19xx ?	St. John's University	Queens, New York	Inactive	
Lambda	1930–1957	Brooklyn College	Brooklyn, New York	Withdrew (ΣΤΔ, then ΑΣΤ)	(Note: The Lambda chapter may have left ΠΑΤ soon after 1950, but Baird's pegs this at 1957. After operating for some years as a local named Sigma Tau Delta, it became the Alpha Omega chapter of Alpha Sigma Tau in 1960.)
Mu	1930–1957	Syracuse University	Syracuse, New York	Withdrew (ΣΤΔ, then ΑΣΤ)	(Note: Baird's 12th edition notes a group of this name on the campus in 1950. It may have left ΠΑΤ soon after 1950, but Baird's pegs this at 1957. It had been formed the year prior as Pi Alpha Mu (local), in 1949, but the naming convention clearly suggests a plan that it become the Mu chapter of ΠΑΤ. Few, if any, of the other chapters of Pi Alpha Tau were in existence at this time: likely only CUNY Hunter College and CUNY Brooklyn College. Soon after the dissolution of that small national, this group would become a chapter - maybe the Beta chapter? of a 2-chapter group called ΣΤΔ. In 1960, it followed the CUNY, Brooklyn College group in merging into Alpha Sigma Tau, becoming its Alpha Iota chapter.)

== See also ==
- List of Jewish fraternities and sororities
- Sigma Delta Tau
- Alpha Sigma Tau
