= Linefork, Kentucky =

Unincorporated community in Kentucky, United States

- Unincorporated community
- Location in Kentucky Location in the United States
- Coordinates: 37°1′11″N 82°57′35″W
- Country: United States
- State: Kentucky
- County: Letcher
- Elevation: 1,237 ft (377 m)
- Time zone: UTC-5 (Eastern (EST))
  - Summer (DST): UTC-4 (EDT)
- ZIP codes: 41833
- GNIS feature ID: 508466

Linefork is an unincorporated community located in Letcher County, Kentucky, United States.
