= Hindman Settlement School =

School in Kentucky, United States

- Hindman, Kentucky; United States

Information
- Motto: Celebrating Heritage, Changing Lives
- Established: 1902
- Campus size: 200 acres
- Campus type: Settlement schools
- Website: www.hindmansettlement.org

Hindman Settlement School is a settlement school located in Hindman, Kentucky in Knott County. Established in 1902, it was the first rural settlement school in America. It is financially supported by the Daughters of the American Revolution.

== Mission ==
The mission of Hindman Settlement School is "to provide educational and service opportunities for the people of the mountains, while keeping them mindful of their heritage."

The Settlement's major work today includes education and service programs that address critical educational needs of the region's youth, promote cultural awareness, and address emerging issues of health and food insecurity through increased access to nutritious, locally-grown foods.

=== Dyslexia ===
In 1980, community members led by Lois Combs Weinberg, founded an Orton-Gillingham based program to tutor children struggling with dyslexia. The program offers afterschool tutoring and a five-week-long intensive summer school program. During the COVID-19 pandemic the school offered its afterschool tutoring program and the summer school program through virtual classes. Due to the popularity and ability to reach more students, the school has continued to offer both virtual and in-person offerings.

Beginning in 2020, in partnership with AmeriCorps, the program has provided in-school reading intervention services in 20 schools across five counties. As of 2024, over one thousand students have been served.

=== Literary ===
The literary program has nurtured the Appalachian literary tradition for more than a century. The program hosts several events throughout the year including the Appalachian Writers Workshop, the Ironwood Writers Studio, the Troublesome Creek Writer's Retreats, Winter Burrow Literary and Arts Conference, and the Oak Ledge Writing Residency.

== Notable staff ==
=== James Still ===
James Still was a notable poet, folklorist, and novelist during his life, spanning 95 years from 1906 to 2001. James Still's friend, Don West offered him a job organizing recreational programs for a settlement school in Knott County, Kentucky. James Still gladly accepted the invitation to teach in Knott County. James Still soon became a librarian at the Hindman Settlement School Library and spent the rest of his days in Knott County. James Still is buried on the Hindman Settlement School Campus.

=== Fred Williams ===
Fred Williams was principal at Hindman Settlement School in the mid-1940s. A close friend of Mohandas Karamchand Gandhi, Williams was a Methodist missionary who pioneered indoor and running water sanitation in rural India (Asansol) and fought to eradicate caste-based discrimination.

== Marie Stewart Museum & Craft Shop ==
The Marie Stewart Museum & Craft Shop supports the activities of the school. The store sells traditional Appalachian crafts and has an online site. Upstairs is a small museum with exhibits about the Hindman Settlement School and regional crafts.

== The school and the study of folksong ==
The School's goal of integrating traditional culture with education led it to welcome visiting outsiders who sought to document the musical heritage of the Appalachians, notably in folk song. The fieldwork teams of Loraine Wyman with Howard Brockway, and Cecil Sharp with Maud Karpeles, working in the years of the First World War, found a wealth of beautiful melody and texts from singers at the School or from the local neighborhood.

== Flood of 2022 ==
On July 28, 2022, Governor of Kentucky Andy Beshear declared a state of emergency after several counties in Eastern Kentucky experienced a thousand-year flood event. The weather event created major flooding of Troublesome Creek that affected nearly all buildings in the Hindman downtown area. Hindman Settlement School sustained significant damage as multiple buildings were inundated with several feet of water.

== See also ==
- Pine Mountain Settlement School
