= Pine Mountain Settlement School =

- U.S. National Register of Historic Places
- U.S. National Historic Landmark District
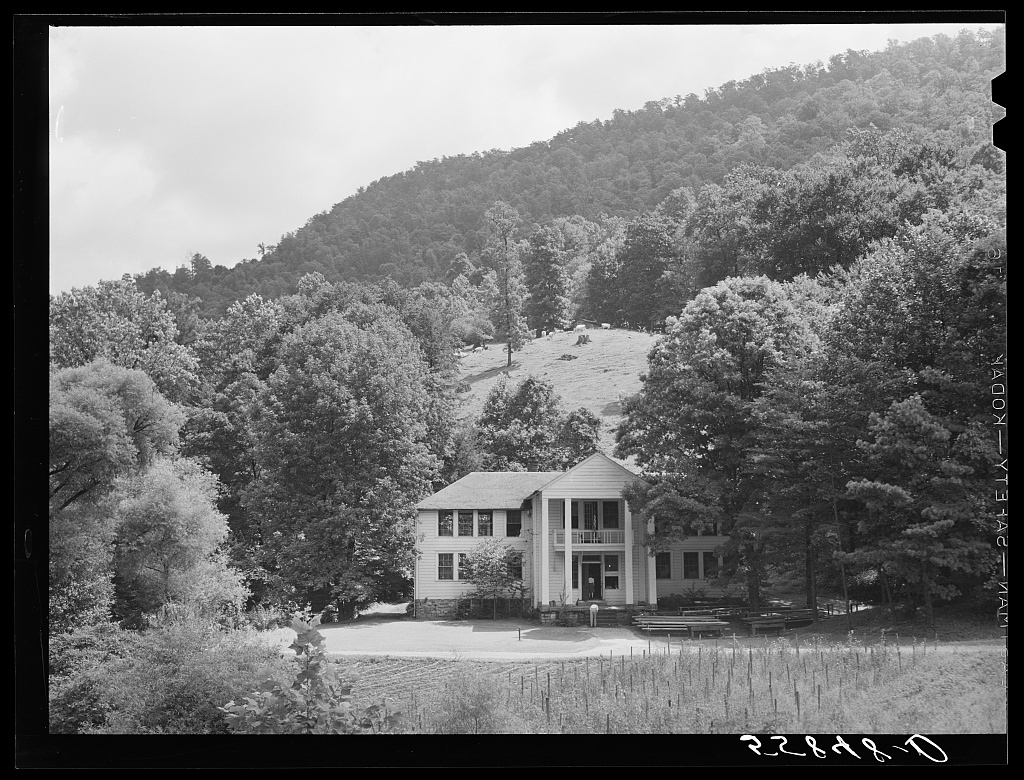
- Pine Mountain Settlement School, photographed by Marion Post Wolcott in 1940

- Location within Kentucky Location within the United States
- Nearest city: Bledsoe, Kentucky
- Coordinates: 36°56′55″N 83°10′59″W
- Area: 54 acres (22 ha)
- Built: 1913
- Architect: Mary Rockwell Hook; Luigi Zande
- NRHP reference No.: 78001337

Significant dates
- Added to NRHP: September 6, 1978
- Designated NHLD: December 4, 1991

The Pine Mountain Settlement School is a historic cultural and educational institution in rural Harlan County, Kentucky. Founded in 1913 as a settlement school near Bledsoe, it now focuses on classes related to the culture of Appalachia and environmental education. It first operated as a boarding grade school for students of the rural region, then in 1930 shifted to operating as a boarding school for high school students. In the later 20th century, it was integrated into the Harlan County Public School System. Its campus is designated as a National Historic Landmark District, for its role as the first major effort to adapt urban settlement reform work into a rural setting.

== Location ==
Pine Mountain Settlement School is located in a rural mountain setting about 19 miles (31 km) northeast of Harlan, the county seat of Harlan County, Kentucky, and southeast of the junction of Kentucky Routes 221 and 510. Pine Mountain is a ridge of the Appalachian Mountains that runs about 125 miles through Kentucky, Virginia and Tennessee.

== History ==
=== Founding ===
Pine Mountain Settlement School was founded during a period of time when more than two hundred schools were founded across Southern Appalachia in order to bring educational opportunities to rural communities across the region. "...Pine Mountain Settlement School was founded in 1913 as a school for children in the commonwealth's remote southeastern mountains and a social center for surrounding communities. The school was the dream of a local man, William Creech Sr., who was troubled by the area's lack of educational opportunities, and the prevalence of social problems and rampant disease. He donated land for the school and recruited two women, Katherine Pettit of Lexington, Kentucky, and Ethel de Long, a New Jersey native, to establish and run the new institution. These two women enlisted the help of architect Mary Rockwell Hook of Kansas City to draw up plans for the campus and its buildings." Luigi Zande, a stonemason, educator, and the husband of Ethel de Long, helped to design and build several buildings on the schools campus, including the stone reservoir and the chapel. It has been designated as a National Historic Landmark District for its importance as a rural example of the urban settlement schools.

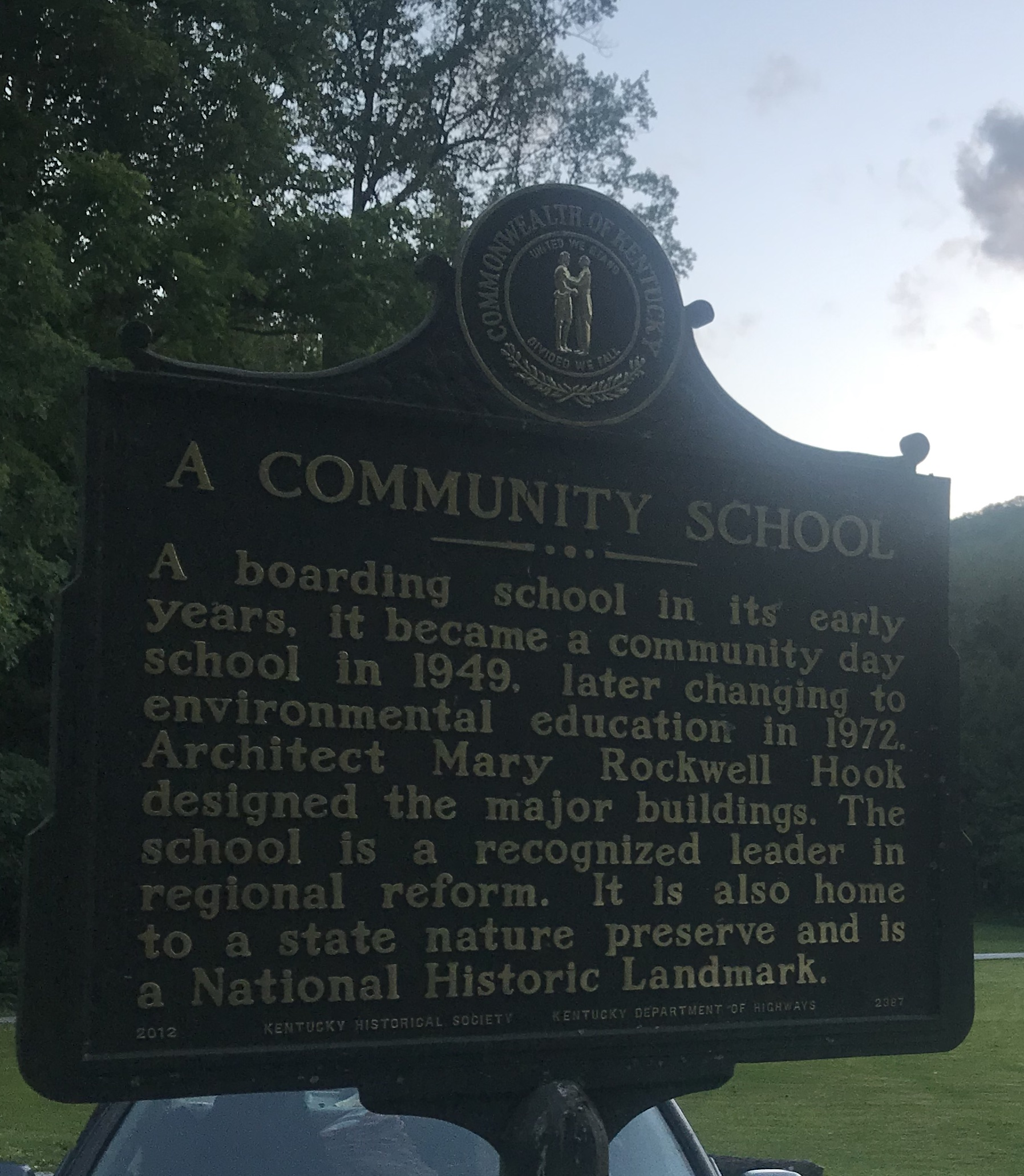
National Historic Register Marker.

=== Uses ===
Pine Mountain Settlement School developed as a rural example of the urban settlement movement, which established institutions such as Hull House in Chicago, to provide education and social services to the new populations of immigrants and migrants in the cities. The school has served many purposes since its founding in 1913, more than a century ago. It continues to operate primarily as an educational institution.

From 1913 to 1930, Pine Mountain served as a boarding school for children of elementary and middle school age.

In 1930, Pine Mountain was adapted as a boarding high school, encouraging vocational and artistic development for students from the Appalachian region, as well as academics.

In 1937, a pack horse library (part of the WPA Travelling Libraries) and community services program was headquartered at Pine Mountain.

In 1949, Pine Mountain and the Harlan County educational system began to jointly operate an elementary school as part of the county public school system.

In the 1970s, Pine Mountain began to focus its efforts on environmental education.

In addition to operating as an educational institution, Pine Mountain Settlement School has served its community in other ways. For example, during Pine Mountain's time as a high school, it sponsored Work Experience Training. This was focused on providing job training to men and helping them find employment.

Pine Mountain has also operated as a farm, health clinic, and a hospital. It has supported local music and craft initiatives such as Fireside Industries. Today, in addition to cultural and environmental education, Pine Mountain Settlement School offers agricultural, culinary, and arts and crafts programming for adults and students.

=== Relationship with Alpha Sigma Tau ===
Alpha Sigma Tau Sorority adopted Pine Mountain Settlement School in 1945 as its national philanthropy. The partnership lasted 71 years until its conclusion in 2016.

Members of alumnae and collegiate chapters and colonies of Alpha Sigma Tau raised money annually for Pine Mountain Settlement School. The Sorority supported Pine Mountain Settlement School through the Alpha Sigma Tau National Foundation, Inc.
