= Cumberland Valley Subdivision =

Railroad line in Kentucky and Virginia, US

CV Subdivision
Overview
- Service type: Freight rail
- Status: Active
- Locale: Eastern Kentucky Coalfield; Southwest Virginia
- First service: late 1880s
- Current operator: CSX Transportation
- Former operator: Louisville and Nashville Railroad

Route
- Termini: Corbin, Kentucky, United States; Big Stone Gap, Virginia, United States
- Distance travelled: 122.4 mi (197.0 km)

Technical
- Track gauge: 1,435 mm (4 ft 8 1/2 in)
- Operating speed: 10–60 mph (16–97 km/h)
- Track owner: CSX Transportation
- Timetable numbers: CV, WB, WH, WM

The Cumberland Valley Subdivision (CV Subdivision) is a railroad line owned and operated by the CSX Railroad (CSX Transportation) in the U.S. states of Kentucky and Virginia. The line runs from Corbin, Kentucky, east to Big Stone Gap, Virginia, along a former Louisville and Nashville Railroad line.

At its west end, the CC Subdivision heads north to Cincinnati, Ohio, and the KD Subdivision heads south to Etowah, Tennessee. The east end is at an interchange with the Norfolk Southern Railway Appalachia District, where CSX trains can proceed south to the Kingsport Subdivision at Frisco, Tennessee, via trackage rights.

== History ==
=== 1886–1910: Construction of the original main to Norton ===
In 1886, the Louisville and Nashville Railroad (L&N) began to work toward a route into the Eastern Kentucky Coalfield. Work from Corbin, Kentucky, commenced on April 29, reaching the town of Pineville, Kentucky, on April 1, 1888. The L&N soon developed plans to extend their Cumberland Valley line all the way to Big Stone Gap, Virginia. The railroad discussed two possible routes: one up the Cumberland River towards Harlan, Kentucky, and another up the Powell and Poor valleys of Southwest Virginia. Civil engineer R.E. O'Brien was hired by the L&N to evaluate the two routes and recommended the Virginia route over the river route. The railroad officially adopted O'Brien's recommendation on March 20, 1889.

In order to bring the Virginia route to life, the L&N completed trackage to Middlesboro, Kentucky, on September 1, 1889. To make its connection into Virginia, the L&N completed a contract with the Knoxville, Cumberland Gap and Louisville Railroad in 1888 to utilize its tunnel underneath Cumberland Gap. The route was finally extended to Big Stone Gap, Virginia on April 15, 1891, then to a place called Intermont, Virginia (now Appalachia) where it connected with the Atlantic and Ohio (later Southern Railway). The route was completed to Norton, Virginia (then Prince's Flat) on May 15, 1891, completing a connection with the Norfolk and Western Railway (N&W).

==== Middlesboro Belt Line ====
Paralleling development of the L&N in Bell County, Kentucky, was the building of a rail network in and around the town of Middlesboro. In 1886, the Middlesborough Belt Rail Road (MBRR) was constructed, encircling the town and running up Bennett's Fork to the southwest. The L&N would purchase the shortline on November 4, 1896. The Belt Line would not be long for the world, as the Middlesboro City Council would approve its removal in 1899.

=== 1910–1930: Into Harlan County ===
The present CV main from Pineville into Harlan County, Kentucky, began life in 1908 as the Wasioto and Black Mountain Railroad. Owned by local businessman T.J. Asher, construction had begun the previous year on a line further up the Cumberland River from a junction with the L&N at Harbell, Kentucky, to extend into the vast coalfields owned by Asher. The L&N assisted Asher in originally building the line, and on September 1, 1909, exercised an option to purchase the line outright. At the time of the sale, the W&BM's trackage stretched 13 miles up the river from Harbell.

After purchasing the W&BM's railroad and extend it further up the river valley, arriving at Harlan, Kentucky, in 1911. Service reached Baxter in April of that year, with the first passenger train arriving in the town of Harlan proper on July 17. The L&N would continue rapid expansion in Harlan County, constructing a branch up the Poor Fork to Benham, Kentucky, by September 4. The Poor Fork Branch would be further extended three miles in 1917 to reach the U.S. Steel's company town of Lynch.

Construction on a branch from Clover Fork commenced thereafter, reaching Ages on May 21, 1912. Further extensions would be built, first to Kildav around March 20, 1916, and to a location named Shields on October 6, 1918. The branch would reach its greatest extent at Highsplint on June 21, 1919.

The 1920s were a boom period for the Cumberland Valley Division of the L&N Railroad. The L&N's Harlan County service would be enhanced in 1921 with the construction of a 17-track yard at Loyall, Kentucky. As many as twenty-seven daily passenger trains would stop at the station in Middlesboro in 1921.

=== 1930–1986: Expansion and the switchback ===
In 1923, the L&N and the Atlantic Coast Line Railroad (ACL) entered into a joint agreement to begin operating the Carolina, Clinchfield and Ohio Railroad (CC&O). With the new agreement, plans were made to connect the Cumberland Valley Division with the CC&O mainline at Spears Ferry, Virginia, just west of Gate City. Plans were made to build the connection from the end of the L&N line in Chevrolet, Kentucky, under Cumberland Mountain, and on towards Spears Ferry. Construction on the connection began in October 1927. All told, 13.6 miles of track were constructed, along with a 6,244-foot tunnel under the mountain. The Harlan-Hagans route was opened on December 1, 1930, at a cost of $5.3 million. Further plans for the CC&O Connection were scrapped due to financial uncertainty, and the L&N opted to leave the switchback in place. As an alternative, the L&N opted would obtain trackage rights over the Interstate Railroad, now Norfolk Southern Railway, from Norton to reach the railroad. The switchback and trackage rights, now from Big Stone Gap, remain in use to this day.

By 1939, there were at least eight separate branches constructed in Bell County, including one at Fourmile; one up Straight Creek from Pineville; one that ran up Clear Creek to Chenoa; a branch up Puckett Creek at Blackmont; and another up Bennett's Fork in Middlesboro.

The year of 1952 would see the end of passenger service at Middlesboro. The L&N would replace the double-tracked portion of the line between Corbin and Harlan Junction with centralized traffic control (CTC) in 1956.

=== 1986–present: Big Stone Gap Connection to present ===
In early 1986, now-owner CSX Transportation constructed a new bridge and a connection to the Norfolk Southern Railway (ex-Southern Railway) at Big Stone Gap, Virginia, utilizing that railroad's Appalachian District as a new route to the Clinchfield main. The following year, the original mainline between Cumberland Gap and Hagans would be removed and abandoned.

== Active branches ==
=== C&M Branch ===
The C&M Branch is a 22.6-mile (36.4 km) branch line that extends from the CV mainline at Heidrick, Kentucky near Barbourville to mines around Manchester. The line parallels Kentucky Route 11 for its entire length. It begins up Little Richland Creek, before crossing over into the Kentucky River watershed at Girdler, Kentucky, and following Collins Creek onto Manchester. This line was originally built by the Cumberland and Manchester Railroad and opened to traffic on January 1, 1917. The branch line would be acquired by the L&N ten years later.

=== Straight Creek Branches ===
The Cumberland Valley Subdivision has two branches that extend up two forks of Straight Creek in Bell County from Pineville.

The Straight Creek Branch is a 20.8-mile (33.5 km) branch line that extends up the Right Fork of Straight Creek from Pineville to a point west of Bledsoe. The line parallels Kentucky Routes 66 and 221 for its entire length. The original branch was built in the 1890s. Originally extending just six miles, the branch would later be extended to Kettle Island on September 4, 1911. In the 1970s, the branch was further extended to its current extent.

The Left Fork Straight Creek Branch is a 11.2-mile (18.0 km) branch line that extends up the Left Fork of Straight Creek from the main branch 1.7 miles up from the mainline at Pineville to Field. The line parallels KY 66 for its entire length. This branch was originally built in 1906 to a place called Griggs. The line would be extended a further eight miles in July 1930 to a point named Harber.

=== Harbell Branch ===
See History section for more information.

The Harbell Branch is a 9.3-mile (15.0 km) branch line that extends from the CV mainline at Harbell to Middlesboro. This section of trackage is part of the original mainline to Big Stone Gap and Norton, converting to branch line use following the abandonment of the Virginia section in the 1980s. This branch largely follows the Yellow Creek, paralleling U.S. Route 25E from Ferndale. The branch line officially ends at Middlesboro yard limits, where it connects to trackage operated by the Knoxville and Cumberland Gap Railroad (KCXG) owned by the R.J. Corman Railroad Group. CSX owns all trackage in the Middlesboro area, but leases it to the KXCG.

=== Poor Fork Branch ===
The Poor Fork Branch is a 33.4-mile branch line that extends up the Poor Fork of the Cumberland from Baxter to Cumberland. The line parallels U.S. Route 119 for its entire length.

By 1917, the branch had been extended from Benham to Lynch to serve the vast operations of the United States Coal and Coke Company, a division of U.S. Steel. At its peak, this operation turned out as many as 130 coal cars per day.

== Inactive or defunct branches ==
=== Chenoa Branch ===
The Chenoa Branch was a 12-mile (19 km) branch line that extended from the CV mainline near Wasioto to the namesake community of Chenoa. The line ran up Clear Creek, paralleled by Kentucky Route 190 for most of its length. This branch was removed in the 1980s.

=== Puckett's Creek Branch ===
The Puckett's Creek Branch is a 8.3-mile (13.4 km) disused branch line that extends from the CV mainline at Blackmont to Alva. The line runs up its namesake Puckett's Creek, paralleled by Kentucky Route 72. The branch was originally constructed by the Black Mountain Railroad in August 1919. L&N acquired ownership of the railroad in 1923, and officially merged it into their system on July 16, 1936.

=== Clover Fork Branch ===
The Clover Fork Branch is a 15.7-mile (25.3 km) disused branch line that extends from the CV mainline at Harlan to Highsplint. The first portion of this line was completed on May 21, 1912, as far as Ages. The branch would be extended a further three times before reaching Highsplint on June 21, 1919. This line would be further extended up the hollow past Holmes Mill to a place called Glenbrook; however, this trackage has since been removed.

== Bibliography ==
- Herr, Kincaid (1942). The Louisville and Nashville Railroad 1850–1942. Louisville, Kentucky: L&N Magazine.
- Mayes, Clyde and Catherine, ed. (May 2007). Railroad Ties from Knoxville, Tennessee to Middlesboro, Kentucky.
