= List of crossings of the Cumberland River =

This is a complete list of current bridges and other crossings of the Cumberland River from the Ohio River near Smithland upstream through northern Tennessee to the split into Martin's Fork and the Poor Fork near Baxter, in Harlan County, Kentucky.

== Crossings ==
=== Kentucky (western) ===
Image	Crossings	Carries	Location	Coordinates
	Smithland Bridge	US 60	Smithland	37.148472°N 88.399526°W
	Interstate 24 Bridge (Livingston-Lyon County Line)	I-24	Lake City and Kuttawa	37.060025°N 88.217885°W
	Unnamed road bridge	US 62	Grand Rivers and Kuttawa	37.030391°N 88.227020°W
	Unnamed railroad bridge	Paducah and Louisville Railroad	Grand Rivers and Kuttawa	
	Barkley Dam		Lake Barkley and Grand Rivers	37.020696°N 88.223335°W
	Lake Barkley Bridge	US 68 / KY 80	Land Between the Lakes and Canton	36.799975°N 87.977536°W

=== Tennessee ===
Image	Crossings	Carries	Location	Coordinates
	Sidney C. Lewis bridge	US 79 / SR 76	Dover	36.490805°N 87.838843°W
	SR 233 Ferry	SR 233	Cumberland City	36.395339°N 87.633997°W
	L & N Railroad Swing Bridge	R.J. Corman Memphis line	Clarksville	36.522565°N 87.364542°W
	Cunningham Bridge	Zinc Plant Road	Clarksville	36.502771°N 87.378460°W
	Clarksville Bridge / GG McClure Bridge	SR 13 / SR 48	Clarksville	35.481107°N 87.374559°W
	Cheatham Dam		Cheatham Lake and Chapmansboro	36.319046°N 87.223398°W
	Cheatham County Veterans Memorial Bridge	SR 49	Ashland City	36.270783°N 87.076173°W
	Andrew B. Gibson Bridge	SR 155 (Briley Parkway)	Nashville	
	Bordeaux Railroad Bridge	Nashville and Western Railroad (Tennessee Central Railway)	Nashville	36.18283°N 86.83175°W
	Martin Luther King Jr. Memorial Bridge	US 41A / SR 12	Nashville	36.191411°N 86.827474°W
	Lyle H. Fulton Memorial Bridge	I-65	Nashville	36.191847°N 86.782767°W
	Kelly Miller Smith Memorial Bridge	Jefferson Street	Nashville	36.176025°N 86.780262°W
	Nashville Terminal Subdivision Bridge	CSX Nashville Terminal Subdivision (Louisville and Nashville Railroad)	Nashville	
	Victory Memorial Bridge	US 31 (James Robertson Parkway) / US 41 / US 431 / SR 6 / SR 11	Nashville	36.168557°N 86.776296°W
	Woodland Street Bridge	Woodland Street	Nashville	36.157643°N 86.775765°W
	John Seigenthaler Pedestrian Bridge		Nashville	36.162169°N 86.772058°W
	Korean War Veterans Memorial Bridge	Korean Veterans Blvd.	Nashville	36.160792°N 86.769436°W
	Silliman Evans Bridge	I-24	Nashville	36.159101°N 86.760003°W
	Radnor Cutoff Bridge	CSX Nashville Terminal Subdivision Radnor Cutoff (Louisville and Nashville Railroad)	Nashville	36.16431°N 86.72530°W
	Cumberland Pedestrian Bridge	pedestrians	Nashville	
	Duke Fuqua Memorial Bridges	SR 155 (Briley Parkway)	Nashville and Madison	36.235116°N 86.712848°W
	William F. Lyell Memorial Bridge	SR 45 (Old Hickory Boulevard)	Madison and Old Hickory	36.263290°N 86.675477°W
	Old Hickory Lock and Dam		Old Hickory Lake; Davidson-Sumner County line	36.296422°N 86.656147°W
	Gallatin Bridge	SR 109	Gallatin and Martha	36.338836°N 86.436568°W
	Nathan J. Harsh Bridge	US 231 / SR 10	Hunters Point	36.299853°N 86.263469°W
	Coleman Winston Memorial Bridge	SR 141	Hartsville	36.373396°N 86.175076°W
	Cordell Hull Bridge	Formerly SR 25	Carthage and South Carthage	36.248519°N 85.954753°W
	Smith County Veterans Memorial Bridge	SR 25	Carthage and South Carthage	36.240964°N 85.943884°W
	Cordell Hull Dam		Carthage and Cordell Hull Lake	
	Route 262 Bridge	SR 262	Milltown	36.360996°N 85.681208°W
	PFC Ben Wade Stone Memorial Bridge	SR 56 / SR 85 / SR 135	Gainesboro	36.373723°N 85.653247°W
	Clay County Veterans Memorial Bridge	SR 52	Celina	36.554031°N 85.513946°W

=== Kentucky (eastern) ===
Crossings	Carries	Location	Coordinates
McMillans Ferry	KY 214	Otia (Monroe County)	
Hugh E. Spear Memorial Bridge	KY 61	Burkesville	36.746313°N 85.371953°W
Cumberland County Veterans Memorial Bridge	KY 90	Burkesville	
Wolf Creek Dam	US 127	Lake Cumberland	
The Housebout Capital of the World Bridge	KY 90	Bronston	
General Burnside Bridge	US 27 / KY 90	Burnside	
Unnamed rail bridge	Norfolk Southern Railway; CNO&TP North District	Burnside	
Edward M. Gatliff Memorial Bridge	KY 90	Cumberland Falls State Resort Park	
Unnamed road bridge	KY 204		
Croley Bend Bridge	I-75	Williamsburg	
Edgar "Bud" Philpot Memorial Bridge	KY 296 west	Williamsburg	
Unnamed road bridge	KY 296 east	Williamsburg	
Unnamed railroad bridge	CSX Transportation; KD Subdivision	Williamsburg	
Unnamed road bridge	US 25W	Williamsburg	
Yaden Bridge	KY 904	Yaden	
Louden Bridge	KY 1064 (Louden Bridge-Dixie Road)	Louden	
Unnamed road bridge	KY 92		
Unnamed road bridge	KY 779		
Unnamed road bridge	KY 1530		
Barbourville Bridge	KY 11	Barbourville	
Old Railroad Lane Bridge	Old Railroad Lane	Artemus	
Artemus Bridge	KY 225	Artemus	
Flat Lick Bridge	US 25E	Flat Lick	
Unnamed road bridge	US 25E	Flat Lick and Fourmile	
Unnamed road bridge	US 25E	Tinsley and Fourmile	
William Lloyd Muncy Jr. Memorial Bridge	KY 2014	Fourmile	36.792190°N 83.743070°W
E.J. Farris Memorial Bridge	KY 2015 (Tennessee Avenue)	Pineville	
Pine Street Bridge	KY 66	Pineville	
Joan Asher Cawood Bridge	US 119	Wasioto	
Unnamed road bridge	KY 1344	Calvin	
Unnamed road bridge	KY 987	Miracle	
Unnamed road bridge	KY 2012	Tejay	
Unnamed road bridge	KY 72	Hulen	
Unnamed road bridge	Saylor Creek Road	Molus	
Dixietown Vietnam Veterans Memorial Bridge	KY 2007	Coldiron	
MSgt. James "Budd" Gordon Farmer Bridge	KY 219	Wallins Creek	
Cpl. Chad B. Lewis Memorial Bridge	KY 3451 (Sutton Drive)	Dayhoit	
Unnamed rail bridge	CSX Transportation; CV Subdivision		
Unnamed road bridge	Park Hill Drive	Loyall	
Moo Cow Curve Memorial Bridge	KY 840	Loyall	
Unnamed rail bridge	CSX Transportation; CV Subdivision	Baxter	

== See also ==
- List of crossings of the Ohio River
