= Wallsend (disambiguation) =

Wallsend is a town in England.

Wallsend may also refer to:

== Places ==
- Electoral district of Wallsend, New South Wales, Australia
- Wallsend (UK Parliament constituency), England
- Wallsend, Kentucky, unincorporated community, US
- Wallsend, New South Wales, suburb of Newcastle, Australia
- Wallsend, New Zealand, a locality

== Other uses ==
- SS Wallsend, several ships
