= César-Pierre Richelet =

French grammarian and lexicographer

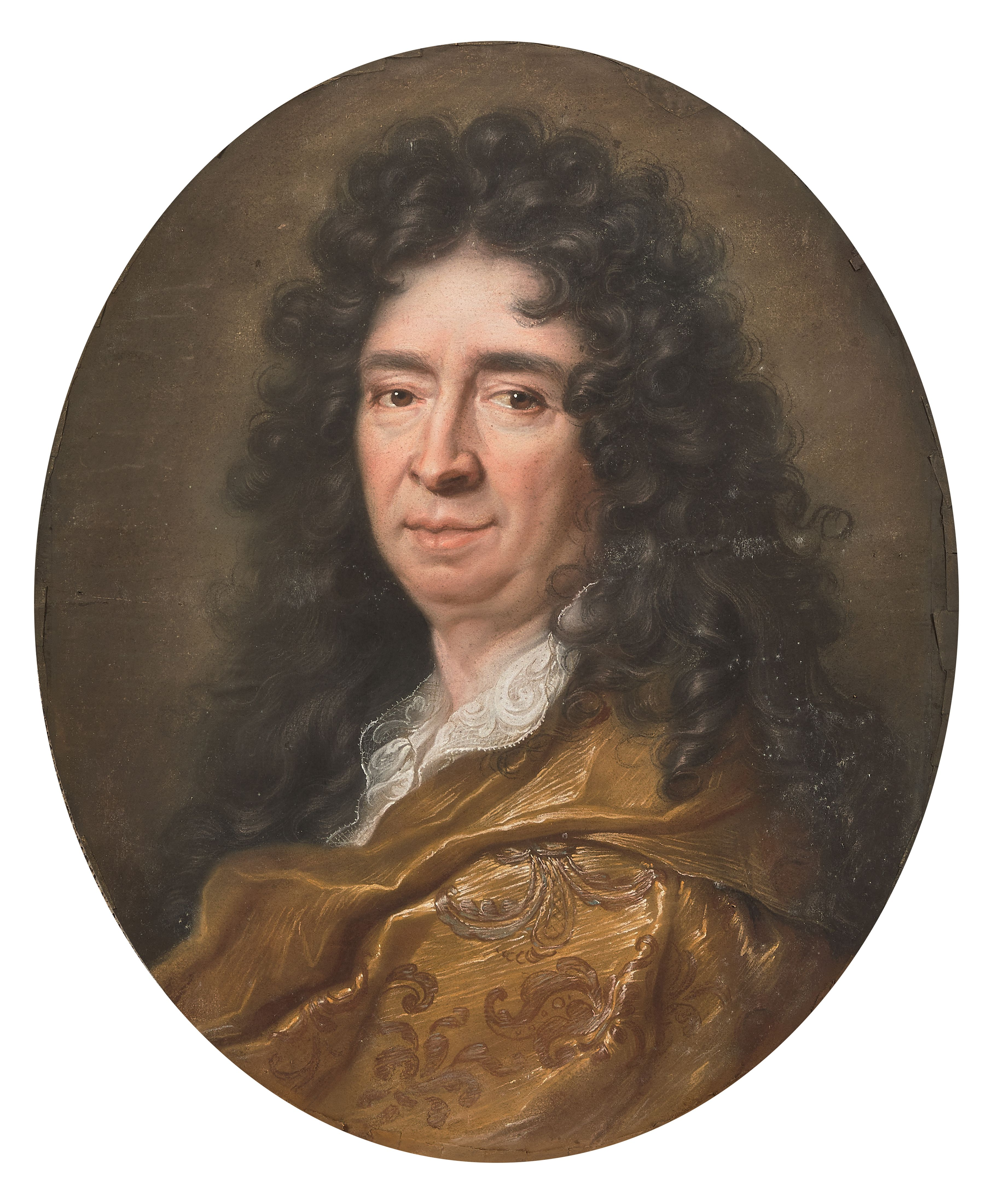
Pastel portrait of César-Pierre Richelet by Joseph Vivien, 17th century

César-Pierre Richelet (French pronunciation: [sezaʁ pjɛʁ ʁiʃlɛ]; 8 November 1626 – 23 November 1698) was a French grammarian and lexicographer, and the editor of the first dictionary of the French language.

== Life ==
Richelet was born in Cheminon. His first position was regent of the College of Vitry-le-François, next preceptor in Dijon. Received as an advocate in service to the Parliament of Paris, he abandoned his affairs for literature and researched the Society of Perrot d'Ablancourt and that of Petru. He strengthened his knowledge of classical languages, learned Italian and Spanish, and applied himself above all to discovering the origins of the French language. He died in Paris.

== Works ==
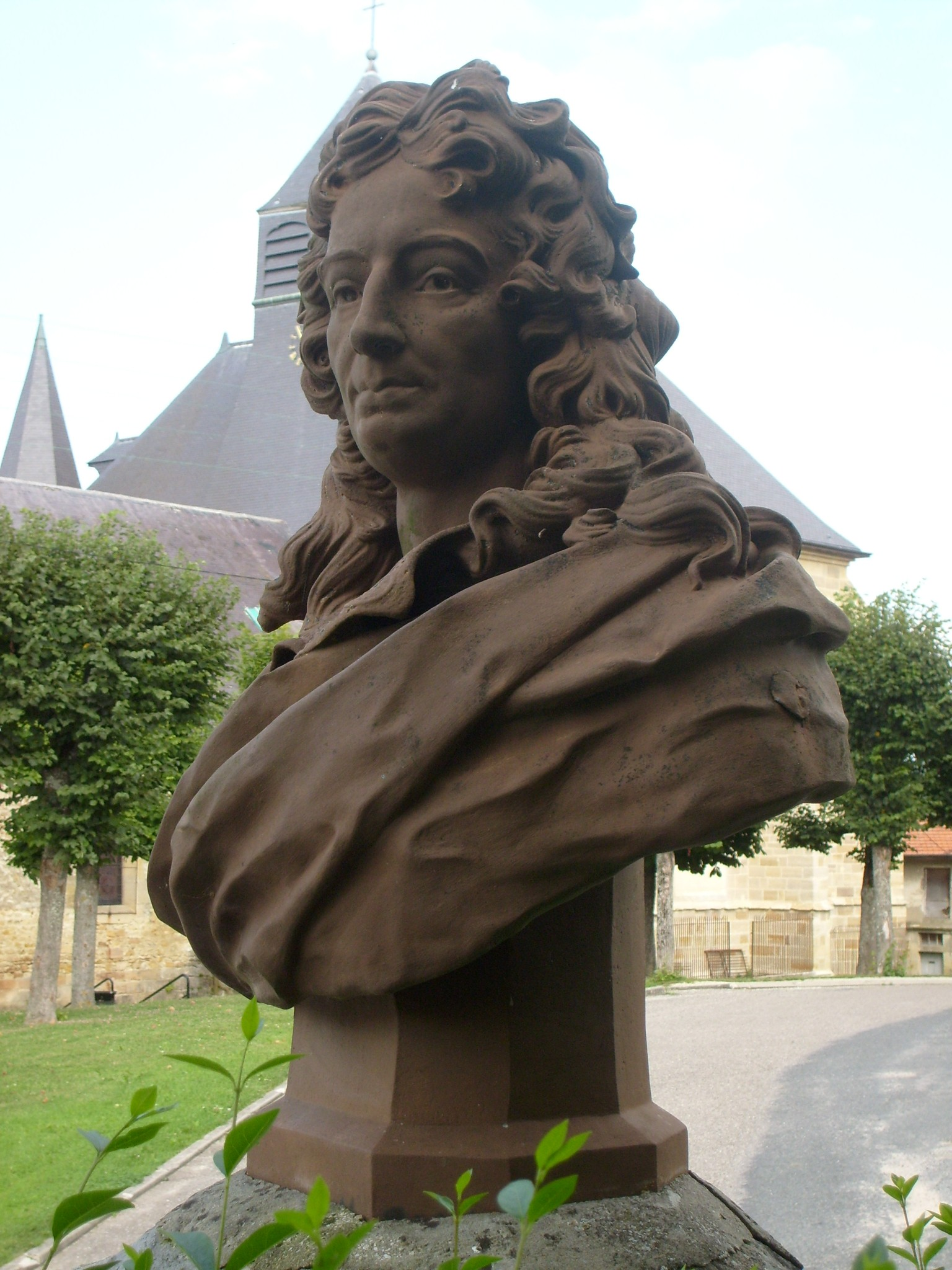
César-Pierre Richelet, bust at Cheminon.

He is the author of the first French dictionary compiled in a methodical way, published under the title of:

- Dictionnaire françois, contenant les mots et les choses, plusieurs nouvelles remarques sur la langue française, ses expressions propres, figurées et burlesques, la prononciation des mots les plus difficiles, le genre des noms, le régime des verbes, avec les termes les plus communs des arts et des sciences: le tout tiré de l'usage et des bons auteurs de la langue française (Geneva, 1680).

His caustic sense of humour earned him enemies; this first edition, of which there were several counterfeit foreign editions, contains satirical passages at the expense of notables of the day including Amelot de La Houssaye, Furetière, Varillas, and others.

Later editions of Richelet were published, both expurgated and augmented. Those that appeared after his death are distinguished by that of Pierre Aubert (Lyon, 1728, 3 vol. in-fol.) and that of Goujet (Ibid., 1759–63, 3 vol. in-fol.). Later editions were abridged such as that of Gattel (Paris, 1842, 2 vol. in-8).

Other works by Richelet are:

- La Versification française, ou l'Art de bien faire et tourner les vers (Paris, 1671, in-12) *Commencements de la langue française, ou Grammaire tirée de l'usage et des bons auteurs (Ibid., 1694., in-12)
- Connaissance des genres français (Ibid., 1694, in-12)

He was also the author of several untitled translations as well as:

- Les plus belles Lettres des meilleurs auteurs français (Lyon, 1689, in-12; Paris, 1698, 2 vol. in-12) and editor of:
- Dictionnaire des rimes (Paris, 1667, in-12), which he attributed to himself but was the work of Fr. d'Ablancourt.

His Dictionnaire françois is distinguished in:

- the rejection of dialect words
- only including words in general use
- the rejection of archaic words
- the rejection of trivial words
