= Tuggleville, Kentucky =

Unincorporated community in Kentucky, United States

Tuggleville
- Unincorporated community
- Location within the state of Kentucky Tuggleville (the United States)
- Coordinates: 36°46′20″N 83°30′16″W
- Country: United States
- State: Kentucky
- County: Bell
- Elevation: 1,132 ft (345 m)
- Time zone: UTC-5 (Eastern (EST))
  - Summer (DST): UTC-4 (EDT)
- GNIS feature ID: 509242

Tuggleville is an unincorporated community located in Bell County, Kentucky, United States. The community is on Puckett Creek just north of Black Snake. Blackmont lies approximately two miles to the northwest on the Cumberland River.
