= Clear Creek Springs, Kentucky =

Unincorporated community in Kentucky, United States

Coordinates: 36°43′37″N 83°43′37″W

Clear Creek Springs
- Unincorporated community
- Location in Kentucky, United States
- Country: United States
- State: Kentucky
- County: Bell
- Time zone: UTC-5 (Eastern)
  - Summer (DST): UTC-4 (EDT)

Clear Creek Springs is an unincorporated community in Bell County, Kentucky, United States. It is named after Clear Creek.
