= Kettle Island Coal Camp, Kentucky =

Unincorporated community in Kentucky, United States

Kettle Island Coal Camp
- Unincorporated community
- Location within the state of Kentucky Kettle Island Coal Camp (the United States)
- Coordinates: 36°47′52″N 83°36′25″W
- Country: United States
- State: Kentucky
- County: Bell
- Elevation: 1,086 ft (331 m)
- Time zone: UTC-5 (Eastern (EST))
  - Summer (DST): UTC-4 (EDT)
- GNIS feature ID: 2554924

Kettle Island Coal Camp was an unincorporated community located in Bell County, Kentucky, United States.
