= Don K. Price =

American political scientist (1910–1995)

Don Krasher Price (23 January 1910 – 9 July 1995) was an American political scientist who served as the founding dean of the John F. Kennedy School of Government from 1958 to 1976. He wrote a number of books about United States history and government.

== Education ==
Price was educated at Middlesboro High School. He studied at Vanderbilt University, Tennessee from 1927 to 1931, and then came to Merton College, Oxford for three years on a Rhodes Scholarship. He was awarded a second class degree in history in 1934, and B.Litt. in 1935.

== Career ==
After serving as a lieutenant in the US Coast Guard during the Second World War, Price joined the Bureau of the Budget in 1946. He was deputy chairman of the US Department of Defense's Research & Development Board from 1952 to 1953, then vice-president of the Ford Foundation until 1959. In 1958 he was appointed as the founding Dean at Harvard University's Graduate School of Public Administration. That same year, he was elected to the American Philosophical Society. He was elected to the American Academy of Arts and Sciences in 1960. From 1961 to 1963 he acted as an adviser to President Kennedy on the structure and operations of the US Federal Government. Price retired from the John F. Kennedy School of Government (as the Harvard Graduate School of Public Administration had been renamed following Kennedy's assassination) in 1976.

Price returned to Oxford in 1985 to spend a year at Balliol College as George Eastman Visiting professor, during which time he was awarded an honorary doctorate by the university.

A native of Middlesboro, Kentucky, Price died on 9 July 1995 in Wellesley, Massachusetts at the age of 85, as a result of complications from Alzheimer's disease.

== Publications ==
- City Manager Government in the US (1940; co-author)
- Government and Science (1954)
- The Scientific Estate (1965)
- America's Unwritten Constitution (1985)
