= Molus =

Molus may refer to:

- Molus, a gossamer-winged butterfly genus now included in Thereus
- Molus, Kentucky, an unincorporated community in Harlan County
- Molus (mythology), the name of three characters in Greek mythology

== See also ==
- Molus River (disambiguation)
