= Rella =

Rella may refer to:

- Rella, Bell County, Kentucky
- "Rella" (song), a song on Odd Future's 2012 album The OF Tape Vol. 2
- Rella Braithwaite (born 1923), Canadian author
