= Arjay =

Arjay may refer to:

- Arjay, Kentucky, an unincorporated community in Bell County, Kentucky, United States
- Arjay Miller (1916–2017), American business executive
- Arjay Smith (born 1983), American actor
