= Meldrum (disambiguation) =

Meldrum is a band.

Meldrum may also refer to:

- Meldrum (surname)
- Meldrum transmitting station, Scottish radio transmitter
- Meldrum Academy
- Meldrum, Bell County, Kentucky
- Meldrum Bay, Ontario

== See also ==
- Oldmeldrum
