= Bell County High School =

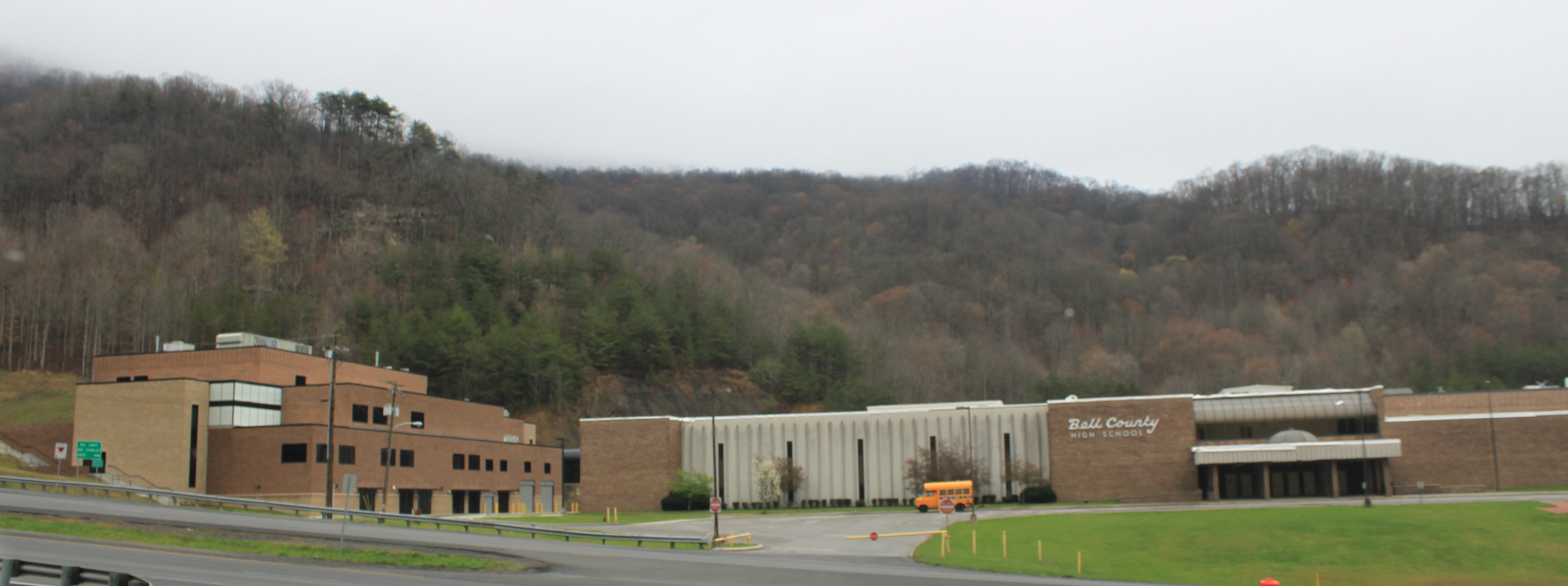

Location
- 9824 US Highway 25E; Pineville, Kentucky 40977; United States
- 36.71123°N 83.69144°W

Information
- Type: Public
- School district: Bell County Schools
- Superintendent: Brian Crawford
- Principal: Jeff Brock
- Teaching staff: 39.00 (FTE)
- Grades: 9 to 12
- Enrollment: 643 (2023-2024)
- Student to teacher ratio: 16.49
- Campus: Rural
- Colors: Blue and white
- Slogan: "We are BC!", "Bobcat Nation", "Bobcat Pride"
- Mascot: Bobcats
- Website: https://hs.bell.kyschools.us/

Bell County High School is one of three public high schools in Bell County, Kentucky, United States, and the only one in the county's school district (the other two, Middlesboro and Pineville, are operated by city-based "independent" districts). The school, which accommodates grades 9–12, became the county district's only public high school in the 1980s when it absorbed Lone Jack High School. Locally referred to as BCHS, Bell High, or Bell County, the current building was built after the flood of 1977 and succeeds the former high school (now known as Old Bell County High School, or simply Old Bell High) which is located in a flood plain and was heavily flooded in '77. Today's campus sits on a hill above US 25E about 3 miles (5 km) south of the county seat of Pineville.

== Notable alumni ==
- George Samuel Hurst - inventor of the first touchscreen technology.

== Sources ==
- http://www.publicschoolreview.com/school_ov/school_id/32175
- https://images.google.com/images?hl=en&rls=com.microsoft:en-us:IE-Address&rlz=1I7ADFA_en&um=1&q=pictures+of+bell+county+high+school&sa=N&start=40&ndsp=20
