= Miracle, Kentucky =

Miracle, Kentucky, may refer to:

- Miracle, Bell County, Kentucky, an unincorporated community
- Miracle, Lincoln County, Kentucky, an unincorporated community
