= Stony Fork =

Stony Fork or Stoney Fork may refer to:

- Stony Fork Creek, a tributary of Babb Creek in Pennsylvania
- Stoney Fork, Kentucky, an unincorporated community in Bell County

== See also ==
- Stony Fork Junction, Kentucky
