= Rim Camp, Kentucky =

Unincorporated community in Kentucky, United States

Rim Camp
- Unincorporated community
- Location within the state of Kentucky Rim Camp (the United States)
- Coordinates: 36°48′4″N 83°43′0″W
- Country: United States
- State: Kentucky
- County: Bell
- Elevation: 1,060 ft (320 m)
- Time zone: UTC-5 (Eastern (EST))
  - Summer (DST): UTC-4 (EDT)
- GNIS feature ID: 2554809

Rim Camp was an unincorporated community located in Bell County, Kentucky, United States.
