= Varilla =

Varilla may refer to:

- Varilla (plant), a genus of plants in the family Asteraceae
- Varilla, Kentucky

== People with the name Varilla ==
- Appuleia Varilla (fl. 17) the only daughter of Sextus Appuleius and Quinctilla, the sister of Publius Quinctillius Varus
- Hay–Bunau-Varilla Treaty, signed on November 18, 1903, two weeks after Panama's independence from Colombia
- Maurice Bunau-Varilla (1856–1944), French press magnate, proprietor of the newspaper Le Matin
- Philippe-Jean Bunau-Varilla (1859–1940), French engineer and soldier

== See also ==
- Varillas, a surname
