= Bell County Schools =

School district in Kentucky, United States

Bell County School District

Address
- 211 Virginia Avenue, Pineville, KY 40977 United States

District information
- Type: Public
- Grades: Pre-K through 12
- Superintendent: Terry Gambrel
- Schools: 7 6 PreK-8 school centers 1 High School (9-12th grades)
- Budget: $32,451,000 (2017-18)
- NCES District ID: 2100390

Students and staff
- Students: 2,451 (2020-21)
- Teachers: 164 (2020-21)
- Staff: 234
- Student–teacher ratio: 15:1
- District mascot: Bobcat

Other information
- Website: https://www.bell.kyschools.us/

Bell County School District is the school district for Bell County, Kentucky, United States.

It is the largest of the three districts in the county. It operates a total of 7 schools, 6 PreK-8 school centers and 1 high school (9th-12th grades). In the 2020–21 school year, it had a total student enrollment of 2,451 students. In 2017–2018, the district's budget was $32,451,000. Its most notable achievements were the 1991 and 2008 state football championships, Class AAA and the cheerleading team going to State in 2008–2011.

== Schools ==
- Bell County High School, grades 9–12. Their mascot is the bobcat.
- Bell Central School Center, grades K-8. Their mascot is the bulldog.
- Frakes School Center, grades K-8. Their mascot is the bear.
- Lone Jack School Center, grades K-8. Their mascot is the mustang.
- Page School Center, grades K-8. Their mascot is the wildcat.
- Right Fork School Center, grades K-8. Their mascot is the panther.
- Yellow Creek School Center, grades K-8. Their mascot is the longhorn.

== See also ==
- WYJR-LP: District-owned radio station
