= Red Oak, Bell County, Kentucky =

Unincorporated community in Kentucky, United States

Red Oak
- Unincorporated community
- Location within the state of Kentucky Red Oak (the United States)
- Coordinates: 36°37′58″N 83°43′40″W
- Country: United States
- State: Kentucky
- County: Bell
- Elevation: 1,237 ft (377 m)
- Time zone: UTC-5 (Eastern (EST))
  - Summer (DST): UTC-4 (EDT)
- GNIS feature ID: 501669

Red Oak is an unincorporated community located in Bell County, Kentucky, United States.

The school in Red Oak burned down sometime in the 1920s and 1930s.
