= Noetown, Kentucky =

Unincorporated community in Kentucky, United States

Noetown
- Unincorporated community
- Nickname: Beltline
- Location within the state of Kentucky Noetown (the United States)
- Coordinates: 36°36′59″N 83°45′19″W
- Country: United States
- State: Kentucky
- County: Bell
- Elevation: 1,194 ft (364 m)
- Time zone: UTC-5 (Eastern (EST))
  - Summer (DST): UTC-4 (EDT)
- GNIS feature ID: 499501

Noetown is an unincorporated community located in Bell County, Kentucky, United States. The probable epicenter of the meteor strike that caused the unique geographical landscape of the area. Many think this is the birthplace of radio legend Matt Jones.
