= Calvin, Kentucky =

Unincorporated community in Kentucky, United States

- Unincorporated community
- Location within Kentucky Location within the United States
- Coordinates: 36°43′20″N 83°37′20″W
- Country: United States
- State: Kentucky
- County: Bell
- Elevation: 1,079 ft (329 m)
- Time zone: UTC-5 (Eastern (EST))
  - Summer (DST): UTC-4 (EDT)
- ZIP code: 40813
- Area code: 606
- GNIS feature ID: 488650

Calvin is an unincorporated community in Bell County, Kentucky, United States. The community is located along U.S. Route 119 and the Cumberland River 4.9 miles (7.9 km) southeast of Pineville. The area on the south side of the river is also known as Page, which was the name of the Louisville and Nashville Railroad station in the community. Calvin has a post office with ZIP code 40813, which opened on April 3, 1908.
