= WYJR-LP =

- Middlesboro, Kentucky; United States
- Frequency: 95.5 MHz
- Branding: Yellow Jacket Radio

Programming
- Format: Classic rock

Ownership
- Owner: Middlesboro Board of Education

History
- Call sign meaning: Yellow Jacket Radio, mascot of Middlesboro High School

Technical information
- Licensing authority: FCC
- Facility ID: 192103
- Class: L1
- ERP: 100 watts
- HAAT: −57 metres (−187 ft)
- Transmitter coordinates: 36°36′32″N 83°44′57″W

Links
- Public license information: LMS

WYJR-LP (95.5 FM) is a radio station licensed to serve the community of Middlesboro, Kentucky. The station is owned by Middlesboro Board of Education, and airs a classic rock format.

The station was assigned the WYJR-LP call letters by the Federal Communications Commission on February 7, 2014.
