= George Samuel Hurst =

American health physicist and inventor

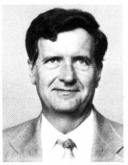
- Born: October 13, 1927; Ponza, Bell County, Kentucky, US
- Died: July 4, 2010 (aged 82); Knoxville, Tennessee, US
- Resting place: Oak Ridge Memorial Park
- Education: Bell County High School; Pineville, Kentucky; Berea College; University of Kentucky; University of Tennessee
- Spouse: Betty Partin Hurst
- Children: 2
- Awards: IR-100 Award
- Scientific career
- Fields: Health physics
- Workplaces: Oak Ridge National Laboratory; University of Kentucky; Florida State University

George Samuel Hurst (13 October 1927 – 4 July 2010) was an inventor, health physicist, and professor of Physics at the University of Kentucky.

== Personal life ==
Hurst was born on 13 October 1927, in the rural town of Ponza, Bell County, Kentucky located near Pineville, Kentucky. His father was James H. Hurst and his mother was Myrtle Wright Hurst. As a boy, he had a keen interest in Thomas Edison. Hurst grew up on a family farm and came from a large family with two brothers and two sisters. In 2010, he died of a brain aneurysm and was buried at Oak Ridge Memorial Park.

== Education ==
Hurst attended high school at Bell County High School in Pineville, Kentucky. At the age of 15, he enrolled in Berea College. In 1947, Hurst received a B.A. degree in physics and a minor in mathematics from Berea College. He attended the University of Kentucky and graduated in 1948 with an M.S. degree in physics. During registration in UK, he met Rufus Ritchie. Ritchie became a longtime friend and the two worked on several projects together. After graduation, they both went to ORNL. In 1959, Hurst was awarded a Ph.D. in physics from the University of Tennessee with a dissertation titled "Attachment of Low-Energy Electrons in Mixtures Containing Oxygen."

== Work ==
In 1948, Hurst was recruited by Karl Z. Morgan and landed a research position at Oak Ridge National Laboratory (ORNL) in the Health Physics Division. His starting salary was $325 per month. He made significant contributions in the development of radiation detectors and instrumentation, neutron dosimetry and spectroscopy, and field sample analysis. While working at Oak Ridge, he earned a PhD in physics from the University of Tennessee in 1959. In 1966, Hurst accepted a position at the University of Kentucky as professor of physics.

Hurst and the team of L.J. Deal and H.H. Rossi performed gamma and neutron radiation measurements at the Nevada Test Site during Operation Upshot–Knothole for the Atomic Energy Commission. For Operation PLUMBBOB, Hurst was again asked to participate along with Ritchie at the Nevada Test Site to collect radiation dosimetry data for human exposures during the tests.

In the 1960s, Hurst along with L.B. O'Kelly, E.B. Wagner, J.A. Stockdale, James E. Parks, and F.J. Davis investigated time-of-flight electron transport in gases. The group utilized ethylene, water vapor and hydrogen to study and determine time-of-flight electron diffusion coefficients and electron drift velocities for these gases. Hurst led efforts to investigate time-of-flight of electron transport in atomic and molecular gases.

In the mid-1960s, Hurst pursued researches that involved electron swarm measurement, swarm‐beam techniques and swarm drift to determine electron capture cross sections in heavy water, chlorobenzene, bromobenzene, ethylene and ethylene mixtures.

== Awards and honors ==
- IR-100 Award, 3 awards
- Union Carbide, Corporate fellow
- American Physical Society, fellow
- University of Kentucky, Alumni Association Hall of Distinguished Alumni, member
- Berea College, D.Sc., honorary degree
- University of Tennessee, physics department, Distinguished Alumni Award, 2005
- University of Tennessee, physics department, G. Samuel and Betty P. Hurst Scholarship Fund; support for physics majors
- Bell County High School, Pineville, Kentucky, notable alumni

== Professional affiliations ==
- Florida State University, visiting professor
- Health Physics Society
- Scientists and Engineers for Appalachia (SEA), founder
- University of Tennessee, Institute of Resonance Ionization Spectroscopy, founder, director 1985–1988

== Patents (15 total) ==
- Resonance ionization for analytical spectroscopy, 1976.
- Method and apparatus for noble gas atom detection with isotopic selectivity, 1984.
- Method of analyzing for a component in a sample, 1984.
- Method and apparatus for sensitive atom counting with high isotopic selectivity, 1987.
- Double pulsed time-of-flight mass spectrometer, 1987.
- Sensitive, stable, effective at low doses and low energy, 1987.
- Ionizing radiation detector system, 1990.
- HVAC system. Radon monitor and control system based upon alpha particle detection, 1991.
- System for determining health risk due to radon progeny and uses thereof, 1993.
- Instrument simulator system, 1994.
- Instrument simulator system, 1995.
- Touch screen based topological mapping with resistance framing design, 2003.
- Touch sensor with non-uniform resistive band, 2007.
- Touch screen with relatively conductive grid, 2010.
- Multiple-touch sensor, 2011

== Private enterprise ==
Hurst founded or co-founded five businesses:

- Elographics, 1971. Developed a version of resistive touchscreen technology. Several patents secured. Electrical Sensor of Plane Coordinates.
- Atom Sciences
- Pellissippi International, 1988.
- Consultec Scientific, 1990.
