= Keenox, Kentucky =

Unincorporated community in Kentucky, United States

Keenox
- Unincorporated community
- Location within the state of Kentucky Keenox (the United States)
- Coordinates: 36°47′17″N 83°40′0″W
- Country: United States
- State: Kentucky
- County: Bell
- Elevation: 10,270 ft (3,130 m)
- Time zone: UTC-5 (Eastern (EST))
  - Summer (DST): UTC-4 (EDT)
- GNIS feature ID: 2710816

Keenox is an unincorporated community located in Bell County, Kentucky, United States.
