= Premier, Bell County, Kentucky =

Unincorporated community in Kentucky, United States

Premier
- Unincorporated community
- Location within the state of Kentucky Premier (the United States)
- Coordinates: 36°35′44″N 83°45′50″W
- Country: United States
- State: Kentucky
- County: Bell
- Elevation: 1,237 ft (377 m)
- Time zone: UTC-5 (Eastern (EST))
  - Summer (DST): UTC-4 (EDT)
- GNIS feature ID: 508871

Premier is an unincorporated community located in Bell County, Kentucky, United States.
