= Molus River =

Molus River may refer to:

- Molus River (New Brunswick), a tributary of the Richibucto River, in Weldford Parish, New Brunswick, Canada
- Molus River, New Brunswick, a community whose name is taken from the above river

== See also ==
- Molus (disambiguation)
