= Wallsend, Kentucky =

Unincorporated community in Kentucky, United States

Wallsend
- Unincorporated community
- Location within the state of Kentucky Wallsend (the United States)
- Coordinates: 36°45′58″N 83°42′36″W
- Country: United States
- State: Kentucky
- County: Bell
- Elevation: 1,020 ft (310 m)
- Time zone: UTC-5 (Eastern (EST))
  - Summer (DST): UTC-4 (EDT)
- GNIS feature ID: 506159

Wallsend is a former unincorporated community and current neighborhood of the city of Pineville, located in Bell County, Kentucky, United States.
