= List of Kentucky Wildlife Management Areas =

Protected area in Louisiana, United States

Kentucky Wildlife Management Areas
- Location within Kentucky
- Coordinates: 32°12′02″N 91°24′41″W
- Established: March 12, 1912
- Governing body: Kentucky Department of Fish and Wildlife Resources

Kentucky Wildlife Management Areas (WMA) are protected conservation areas within the US state of Kentucky, owned or managed, and overseen by the Kentucky Department of Fish and Wildlife Resources.

== Wildlife regions ==
The management areas are grouped in five regions and three management intensity levels. The stated goal is "conservation and public access".

=== Bluegrass region ===
Name	County or counties	Area (acres)	Description	Management level
Curtis Gates Lloyd WMA	Grant County	1,105 acres (447 ha)	N 38.77309, W -84.6013	Moderate
Decker WMA	Boone County	300 acres (120 ha)	N 38.9894, W -84.7641	Low
Dr. James R. Rich WMA	Owen County	2,264 acres (916 ha)	N 38.3945, W -84.7284	Moderate
Dr. Norman & Martha Adair WMA - Low	Boone County	635 acres (257 ha)	N 38.9210, W -84.7468	Moderate
Griffith Woods WMA	Harrison County	746 acres (302 ha)	N 38.3345, W -84.3544	Moderate
John A. Kleber WMA	Owen and Franklin counties.	4,463 acres (1,806 ha)	N 38.3583, W -84.7846	Moderate
John C. Williams WMA	Nelson County	1,073 acres (434 ha)	N 37.7758, W -85.6843	Low
Kentucky River WMA	Henry and Owen County	3,643 acres (1,474 ha)	N 38.4091, W -84.8951	High
Knobs State Forest & WMA	Bullitt	1,537 acres (622 ha)	N 37.8903, W -85.6961	Low
Miller Welch-Central KY WMA	Madison	1,847 acres (747 ha)	Latitude N 37.6345, W -84.2007	Moderate
Mullins WMA	Grant, Kenton	259 acres (105 ha)	N 38.8136, W -84.6082	Low
T. N. Sullivan WMA	Franklin County	145 acres (59 ha)	N 38.2802, W -84.8308	Moderate
Taylorsville Lake WMA	Spencer, Anderson and Nelson counties.	9,417 acres (3,811 ha)	N 38.0155, W -85.2257	High
Twin Eagle WMA	Owen County	170	N 38.5748, W -85.0328	Low
Veterans Memorial WMA	Scott County	2,998 acres (1,213 ha)	N 38.3038, W -84.5570	Moderate
Marion Co. WMA & State Forest	Marion County	1,341 acres (543 ha)	N 37.5481, W -85.1209	Low
Rolling Fork WMA	Nelson, Larue County	2,896 acres (1,172 ha)	N 37.5341, W -85.5590	Moderate
Stephens Creek WMA	Gallatin County	398 acres (161 ha)	N 38.7483, W -84.9704	Low
Bluegrass Army Depot	Madison County	14,494 acres (5,866 ha)	N 37.6950, W -84.1810	Not listed

=== Green River region ===
Name	County or counties	Area (acres)	Description	Management level
Barren River Lake WMA	Allen and Barren	8,735 acres (3,535 ha)	N 36.8777, W -86.0556	High
Higginson-Henry WMA	Union	5,446 acres (2,204 ha)	N 37.6280, W -87.8286	High
Marrowbone State Forest & WMA	Metcalfe & Cumberland	1,955 acres (791 ha)	N 36.8479, W -85.6079	Moderate
Nolin River Lake WMA	Edmonson, Grayson & Hart cos	6,456 acres (2,613 ha)	N 37.3811, W -86.0721	Low
Peabody WMA	Ohio, Hopkins and Muhlenberg	40,744 acres (16,489 ha)	N 37.2800, W -86.9034	High
Sloughs WMA	Henderson and Union	11,173 acres (4,522 ha)	N 37.8609, W -87.7793	High
Yellowbank WMA -	Breckinridge	7,554 acres (3,057 ha)	N 37.9932, W -86.5174	High
Blackford Oaks WMA	Webster	565 acres (229 ha)	N 37.4263, W -87.8649	Low
Clear Creek WMA	Hopkins	858 acres (347 ha)	N 37.3154, W -87.6784	Low
Gabbard Branch WMA	Butler	809 acres (327 ha)	N 37.2186, W -86.5284	Low
Harris-Dickerson WMA	Hopkins	1,837 acres (743 ha)	N 37.3182, W -87.3696	Moderate
L.B. Davison WMA	Ohio	137 acres (55 ha)	N 37.5503, W -86.7126	Low
Lee K. Nelson WMA	Webster	60 acres (24 ha)	N 37.5015, W -87.6864	Low
Rough River Lake WMA	Breckinridge, Grayson, and Hardin counties	4,180 acres (1,690 ha)	N 37.6361, W -86.4362	Low
Blackford Oaks WMA	Webster	565 acres (229 ha)	N 37.4263, W -87.8649	Low
Fort Knox Military Reservation	Bullitt, Meade and Hardin counties	108,618 acres (43,956 ha)	Not a WMA but managed under state wildlife regulations and enforcement.	Not listed

=== Northeast region ===
Name	County or counties	Area (acres)	Description	Management level
Clay WMA	Nicholas, Fleming, and Bath counties.	8,979 acres (3,634 ha)	N 38.3411, W -83.9195	High
Continental Hunting Access Area	Pike, Letcher, and Floyd counties.	15,036 acres (6,085 ha)	Not a WMA but managed under state wildlife regulations and enforcement.	Not listed
Czar Hunting Access Area	Johnson, Martin, and Floyd counties	15,090 acres (6,110 ha)	Not a WMA but managed under state wildlife regulations and enforcement.	Not listed
Dewey Lake WMA	Floyd	9,172 acres (3,712 ha)	N 37.7015, W -82.6457	Moderate
Fishtrap Lake WMA	Pike	13,138 acres (5,317 ha)	N 37.4258, W -82.4132	Low
Fleming WMA	Fleming	1,907 acres (772 ha)	N 38.4338, W -83.6329	Moderate
Grayson Lake WMA	Carter and Elliott counties	8,025 acres (3,248 ha)	N 38.2421, W -82.9818	High
Legacy-LLC Hunting Access Area	Floyd, Martin, and Pike counties	21,351 acres (8,640 ha)	Not a WMA but managed under state wildlife regulations and enforcement.	Not listed
Paintsville Lake WMA	Johnson and Morgan counties	11,220 acres (4,540 ha)	N 37.9003, W -82.9636	Moderate
Pioneer Weapons WMA	Bath and Menifee counties	7,731 acres (3,129 ha)	N 38.0438, W -83.5720	Low
RH Group Hunting Access Area	Floyd, Letcher, Magoffin, McCreary, and Pike counties	N 37.5048, W -82.3581	Not a WMA but managed under state wildlife regulations and enforcement.	Not listed
South Shore WMA	Greenup	98 acres (40 ha)	N 38.7342, W -82.9360	Moderate
Yatesville Lake WMA	Lawrence	2,006 acres (812 ha)	N 38.0964, W -82.6822	Moderate
Betterment Wildlife Hunting Access	Knott, Leslie, Letcher, Perry, and Pike	8,001 acres (3,238 ha)	N 37.3077, W -82.8223. Not a WMA but managed under state wildlife regulations and enforcement.	Not listed
Ed Mabry-Laurel Gorge WMA	Elliot County	1,486 acres (601 ha)	N 38.1290, W -83.1896	Low
Elk Horn Coal Hunting Access Area	Floyd, Letcher, Knott, and Pike counties	N 37.2354, W -82.7716	Not a WMA but managed under state wildlife regulations and enforcement.	Not listed
Horse Mill Branch WMA	Morgan	640 acres (260 ha)	N 37.9435, W -83.1012	Low
Old Trace Creek WMA	Lewis	769 acres (311 ha)	N 38.3800, W -83.2771	Low
Pocahontas WMA	Harlan, Pike, Martin, Floyd, and Johnson counties	54,568 acres (22,083 ha)	N 36.7524, W -83.3449	Low
Simon Kenton WMA	Mason	982 acres (397 ha)	N 38.6081, W -83.7422	Low
Sunny Brook WMA	Rowan	142 acres (57 ha)	N 38.2240, W -83.3837	Low

=== Purchase region ===
Name	County or counties	Area (acres)	Description	Management level
Ballard WMA	Ballard County	8,014 acres (3,243 ha)	N 37.1821, W -89.0271	High
Big Rivers WMA & State Forest	Crittenden and Union counties	7,574 acres (3,065 ha)	N 37.5454, W -88.0287	High
Boatwright WMA	Ballard	8,883 acres (3,595 ha)	N 37.0095, W -89.1218	High
Coil Estate WMA	Carlisle	795 acres (322 ha)	N 36.9113, W -89.0235	Low
Doug Travis WMA	Carlisle & Hickman counties	4,132 acres (1,672 ha)	N 36.8015, W -89.0933	Moderate
Lake Barkley WMA	Trigg and Lyon counties	907 acres (367 ha)	N 36.6874, W -87.9090	Low
Livingston County WMA & State Natural Area	Livingston	2,430 acres (980 ha)	N 37.3362, W -88.4173	Moderate
Ohio River Islands WMA	Livingston	1,264 acres (512 ha)	N 37.2202, W -88.4516	Low
Tradewater WMA	Christian and Hopkins counties	727 acres (294 ha)	N 37.1470, W -87.6714	Low
West Kentucky WMA	McCracken	4,495 acres (1,819 ha)	N 37.1332, W -88.8139	Moderate
Beechy Creek WMA	Calloway	119 acres (48 ha)	N 36.5577, W -88.1326	Low
Ferguson Creek WMA	Livingston	615 acres (249 ha)	N 37.1400, W -88.3701	Low
Jones-Keeney WMA	Caldwell	2,055 acres (832 ha)	N 37.1497, W -87.7599	Low
Kaler Bottoms WMA	Graves	1,904 acres (771 ha)	N 36.8382, W -88.5271	Low
Kentucky Lake WMA	Calloway & Marshall	4,044 acres (1,637 ha)	N 36.5633, W -88.1577	Low
Obion Creek WMA	Hickman, Carlisle, and Fulton	5,326 acres (2,155 ha)	N 36.6317, W -89.1265	Low
Winford WMA	Carlisle	236 acres (96 ha)	N 36.9272, W -89.0601	Low
Fort Campbell Military Reservation	Christian &Trigg	36,113 acres (14,614 ha)	Not a WMA but managed under state wildlife regulations and enforcement.	Not listed

=== Southeast region ===
Name	County or counties	Area (acres)	Description	Management level
Asher Hunting Access Area	Bell and Harlan	13,145 acres (5,320 ha)	Not a WMA but managed under state wildlife regulations and enforcement. N 36.8967, W -83.5772	Not listed
Beaver Creek WMA	McCreary & Pulaski	17,753 acres (7,184 ha)	N 36.8889, W -84.4940	High
Big South Fork National River & Recreation Area	McCreary	30,300 acres (12,300 ha)	Not a WMA but managed under state wildlife regulations and enforcement. N 36.6970, W -84.4800	Not listed
Cane Creek WMA	Laurel	6,677 acres (2,702 ha)	N 36.9975, W -84.2848	Moderate
Cedar Creek Lake WMA	Lincoln	796 acres (322 ha)	N 37.4564, W -84.5499	Low
Continental Hunting Access Area	Pike, Letcher, Floyd	15,036 acres (6,085 ha)	Not a WMA but managed under state wildlife regulations and enforcement. N 37.2063, W -82.6123	Not listed
Dennis-Gray WMA	Adair	102 acres (41 ha)	N 37.2659, W -85.1507	Moderate
Dix River WMA	Lincoln	401 acres (162 ha)	N 37.4923, W -84.5010	Low
Green River Lake WMA	Taylor & Adair	21,019 acres (8,506 ha)	N 37.2925, W -85.2998	High
Hensley-Pine Mountain WMA	Letcher, Harlan	4,838 acres (1,958 ha)	N 37.0165, W -82.9373	Low
Hidden Valley Training Area	Powell	523 acres (212 ha)	Owned by the Kentucky National Guard and functions as a WMA.	Not listed
Lake Cumberland WMA	Clinton, McCreary, Pulaski, Russell and Wayne counties	38,788 acres (15,697 ha)	N 36.8605, W -85.0793	Moderate
Mill Creek WMA	Jackson	13,009 acres (5,265 ha)	N 37.4240,W -84.0638	Moderate
Mud Camp Creek WMA	Cumberland	572 acres (231 ha)	N 36.7710, W -85.5123	Low
Paul Van Booven WMA	Breathitt	2,287 acres (926 ha)	N 37.4471, W -83.2038	Moderate
Ping-Sinking Valley WMA	Pulaski	806 acres (326 ha)	N 37.1958, W -84.3885	Moderate
R. F. Tarter WMA	Adair & Russell	1,171 acres (474 ha)	N 37.1643, W -85.0713	Low
Redbird WMA	Clay & Leslie	24,033 acres (9,726 ha)	N 37.1031, W -83.5341	Low
Robinson Forest WMA	Breathitt & Perry	2,003 acres (811 ha)	N 37.4502, W -83.1954	Low
Rockcastle River WMA	Pulaski	2,922 acres (1,182 ha)	N 37.1154, W -84.3509	Moderate
RH Group Hunting Access Area	Floyd, Letcher, Magoffin, McCreary, and Pike counties	15,088 acres (6,106 ha)	Not a WMA but managed under state wildlife regulations and enforcement. N 37.5048, Longitude W -82.3581	Not listed
University of the Cumberlands WMA	Whitley and McCreary	10,275 acres (4,158 ha)	N 36.7034, W -84.1999	Low
Betterment Wildlife Hunting Access	Knott, Leslie, Letcher, Perry, Pike	8,001 acres (3,238 ha)	Not a WMA but managed under state wildlife regulations and enforcement. N 37.3077, Longitude W -82.8223	Not listed
Boone Forestlands WMA	Bell, Harlan, Clay, & Leslie counties	27,996 acres (11,330 ha)	N 36.8818, W -83.4971	Moderate
Buck Creek WMA	Pulaski	850 acres (340 ha)	N 37.1069, W -84.4097	Moderate
Buckhorn Lake WMA	Perry & Leslie	3,570 acres (1,440 ha)	N 37.3413, W -83.4699	Low
Burchell-Beech Creek WMA	Clay	1,241 acres (502 ha)	N 37.1687, W -83.7081	Low
Carr Creek Lake WMA	Knott	2,880 acres (1,170 ha)	N 37.2430, W -82.9467	Low
Cumberland Forest WMA	Bell, Knox & Leslie counties	54,136 acres (21,908 ha)	N 36.6302, W -83.8577	Moderate
Cranks Creek WMA	Harlan	2,155 acres (872 ha)	N 36.7563, Longitude W -83.1972	Low
Dale Hollow Lake WMA	Cumberland & Clinton	5,632 acres (2,279 ha)	N 36.6745, W -85.3394	Low
Elk Forest WMA	Clay, Bell, Knox, & Leslie counties	16,587 acres (6,713 ha)	N 36.9820, W -83.5324	Moderate
Elk Horn Coal Hunting Access Area	Floyd, Letcher, Knott, and Pike	19,976 acres (8,084 ha)	Not a WMA but managed under state wildlife regulations and enforcement. N 37.2354, W -82.7716	Not listed
Fortner-Davis WMA	Bell	1,358 acres (550 ha)	N 36.6970, W -83.7004	Low
Hoskins WMA	Leslie, Harlan	5,292 acres (2,142 ha)	N 37.1050, W -83.3679	Low
Kentucky Ridge Forest WMA & Kentucky Ridge State Forest	Bell	3,504 acres (1,418 ha)	N 36.7724, W -83.7708	Moderate
Martins Fork Lake WMA	Bell	11,794 acres (4,773 ha)	N 36.6765, W -83.8526	Low
Martins Fork WMA & State Natural Area	Harlan	764 acres (309 ha)	N 36.7363, W -83.2588	Low
Meadow Creek WMA	Wayne	232 acres (94 ha)	N 36.9264, W -84.7197	Low
Pocahontas WMA	Harlan, Pike, Martin, Floyd, and Johnson counties	54,568 acres (22,083 ha)	N 36.7524, W -83.3449	Low
Ross Creek WMA	Lee and Estill counties	1,296 acres (524 ha)	N 37.6039, W -83.8571	Low
Shillalah Creek WMA	Bell and Harlan counties	2,535 acres (1,026 ha)	N 36.6981, W -83.4470	Low
Stone Mountain WMA & State Natural Area	Harlan	1,017 acres (412 ha)	N 36.7614, W -83.1383	Low
Wells Hunting Access Area	Breathitt, Knott, Perry, and Leslie counties	5,346 acres (2,163 ha)	Not a WMA but managed under state wildlife regulations and enforcement. N 37.2060, W -83.0422	Not listed
