= Arjay, Kentucky =

Unincorporated community in Kentucky, United States

- Unincorporated community
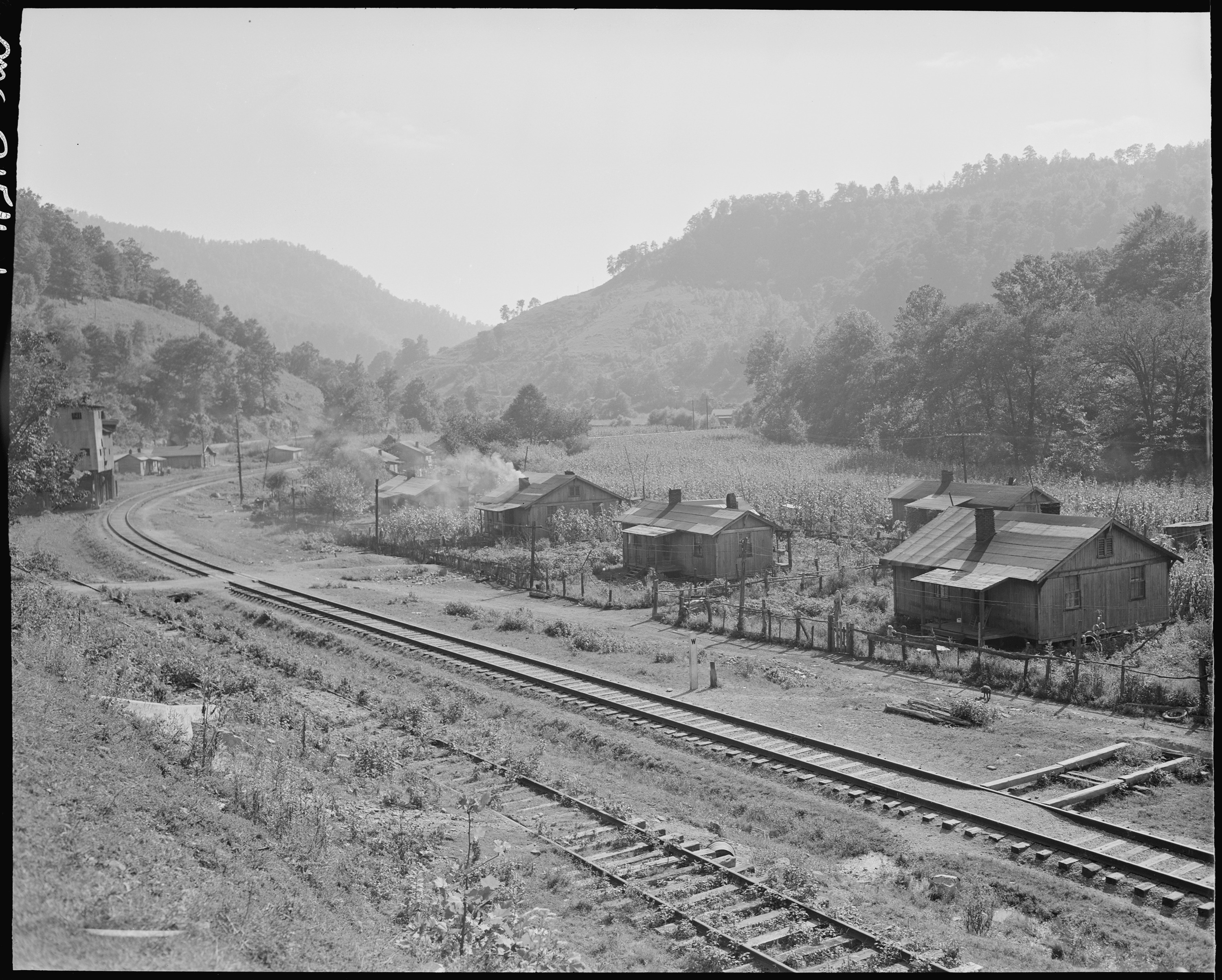
- Houses along the railroad track in Arjay, 1946. Photo by Russell Lee.

- Location within Kentucky
- Coordinates: 36°48′17″N 83°38′45″W
- Country: United States
- State: Kentucky
- County: Bell

Area
  - Total: 0.62 sq mi (1.61 km^{2})
  - Land: 0.62 sq mi (1.61 km^{2})
  - Water: 0 sq mi (0.00 km^{2})
- Elevation: 1,066 ft (325 m)

Population (2020)
  - Total: 183
  - Density: 295.2/sq mi (113.97/km^{2})
- Time zone: UTC-5 (Eastern (EST))
  - Summer (DST): UTC-4 (EDT)
- ZIP code: 40902
- Area code: 606
- GNIS feature ID: 486025

Arjay is an unincorporated community and coal town in Bell County, Kentucky, United States. Arjay is located on Kentucky Route 66 4 miles (6.4 km) northeast of Pineville. Arjay has a post office with ZIP code 40902, which opened on February 23, 1911. The community's name comes from the initials of coal operator R. J. Asher.

== Demographics ==
Historical population
Census	Pop.	Note	%±
2020	183		—
U.S. Decennial Census
