= Black Snake, Kentucky =

Unincorporated community in Kentucky, United States

Black Snake
- Unincorporated community
- Location within the state of Kentucky Black Snake (the United States)
- Coordinates: 36°46′5″N 83°30′12″W
- Country: United States
- State: Kentucky
- County: Bell
- Elevation: 1,115 ft (340 m)
- Time zone: UTC-5 (Eastern (EST))
  - Summer (DST): UTC-4 (EDT)
- GNIS feature ID: 487388

Black Snake is an unincorporated community located in Bell County, Kentucky, United States.

Black Snake has been noted for its unusual place name.
