= Varilla, Kentucky =

Unincorporated community in Kentucky, United States

Varilla
- Unincorporated community
- Location within the state of Kentucky Varilla (the United States)
- Coordinates: 36°44′22″N 83°36′0″W
- Country: United States
- State: Kentucky
- County: Bell
- Elevation: 1,024 ft (312 m)
- Time zone: UTC-5 (Eastern (EST))
  - Summer (DST): UTC-4 (EDT)
- GNIS feature ID: 505983

Varilla is an unincorporated community located in Bell County, Kentucky, United States.
