= Ponza, Bell County, Kentucky =

Unincorporated community in Kentucky, United States

Ponza
- Unincorporated community
- Location within the state of Kentucky Ponza (the United States)
- Coordinates: 36°43′12″N 83°38′33″W
- Country: United States
- State: Kentucky
- County: Bell
- Elevation: 994 ft (303 m)
- Time zone: UTC-5 (Eastern (EST))
  - Summer (DST): UTC-4 (EDT)
- GNIS feature ID: 508849

Ponza is an unincorporated community located in Bell County, Kentucky, United States.
