= Kildav, Kentucky =

Unincorporated community in Kentucky, United States

- Unincorporated community
- Location within Kentucky Location within the United States
- Coordinates: 36°51′30″N 83°12′21″W
- Country: United States
- State: Kentucky
- County: Harlan
- Elevation: 1,358 ft (414 m)
- Time zone: UTC-5 (Eastern (EST))
  - Summer (DST): UTC-4 (EST)
- GNIS feature ID: 495723

Kildav is an unincorporated community and coal town in Harlan County, Kentucky, United States. Its post office is closed. The name is a combination of Killebrew and Davis, owners of the King Harlan Coal Company.
