= Highsplint, Kentucky =

Unincorporated community in Kentucky, United States

- Unincorporated community
- Location within Kentucky Location within the United States
- Coordinates: 36°53′41″N 83°7′2″W
- Country: United States
- State: Kentucky
- County: Harlan
- Elevation: 1,434 ft (437 m)
- Time zone: UTC-05:00 (Eastern (EST))
  - Summer (DST): UTC-04:00 (EDT)
- GNIS feature ID: 512699

Highsplint is a former coal town with an extinct post office in Harlan County, Kentucky, United States. It was named for the High Splint and Seagraves Coal Companies which operated a mine in the town at that time. Highsplint's first post office was established on February 7, 1918, with John D. Casey as postmaster, remaining in operation until 1974.
