= Field, Kentucky =

Unincorporated community in Kentucky, United States

Field
- Unincorporated community
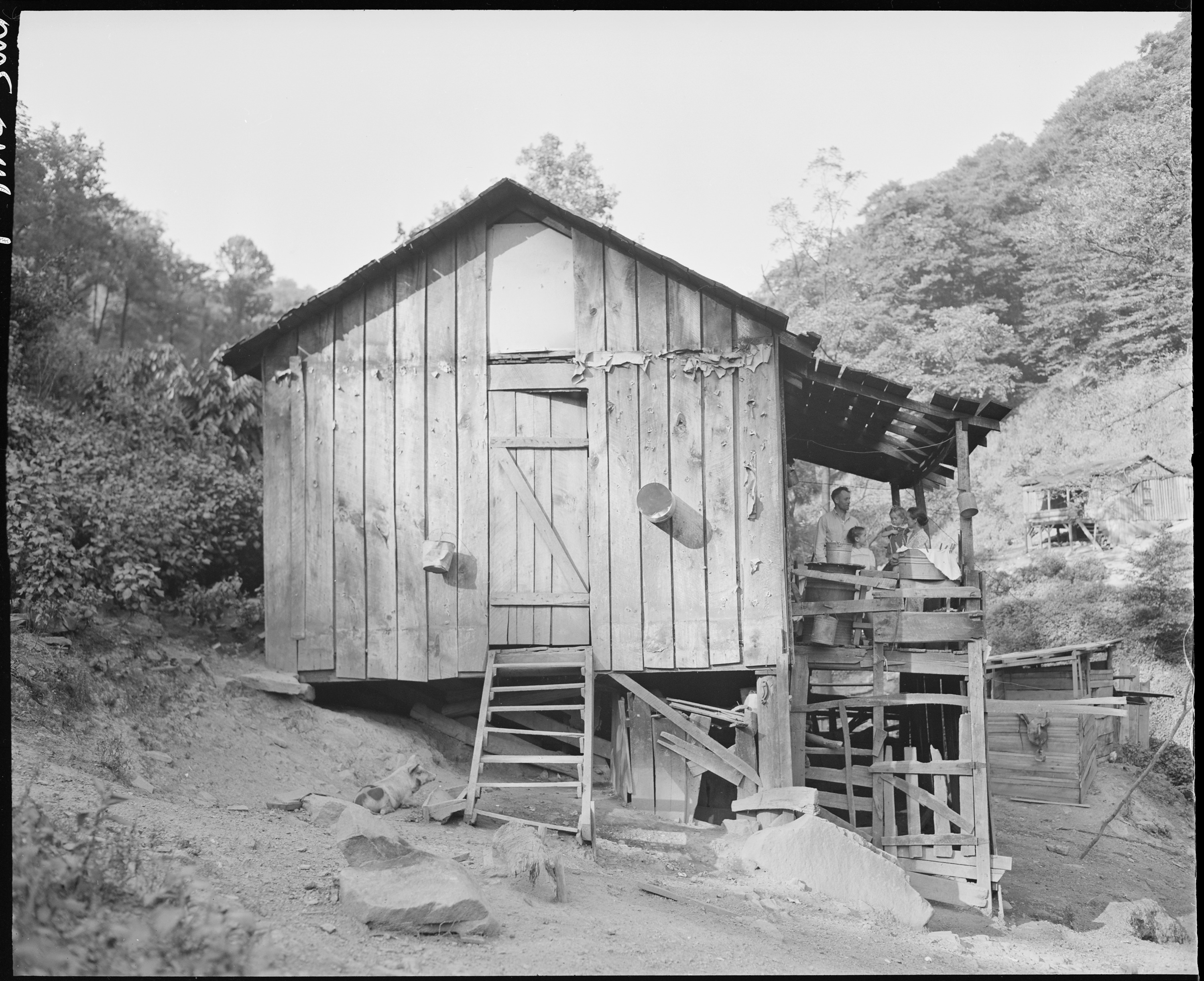
- House in Field, Bell County, Kentucky

- Location within the state of Kentucky Field (the United States)
- Coordinates: 36°53′34″N 83°36′8″W
- Country: United States
- State: Kentucky
- County: Bell
- Elevation: 1,335 ft (407 m)
- Time zone: UTC-5 (Eastern (EST))
  - Summer (DST): UTC-4 (EDT)
- GNIS feature ID: 512154

Field is an unincorporated community located in Bell County, Kentucky, United States.
