= Cheminon =

- Commune
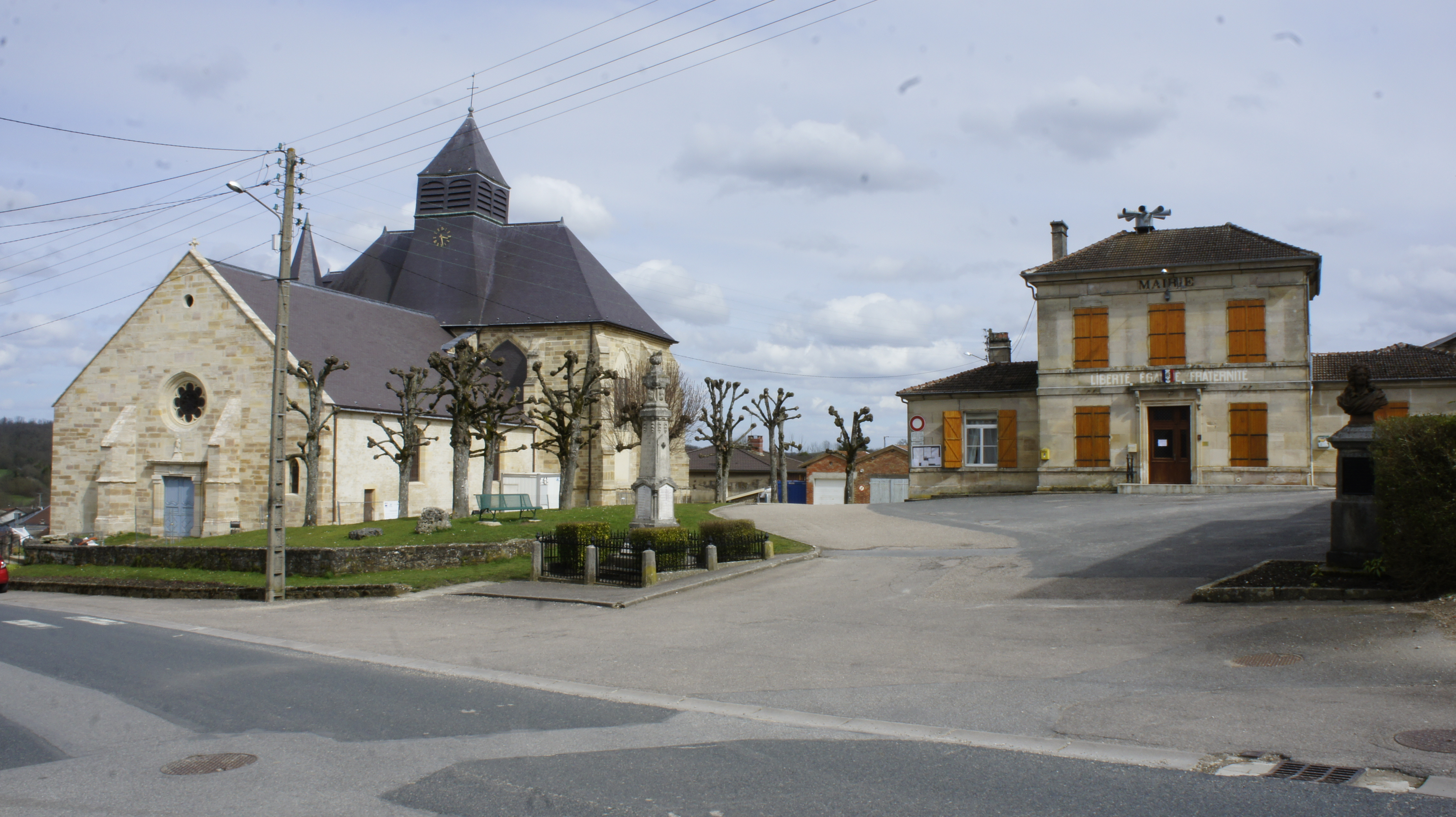
- The church and town hall in Cheminon

- Coat of arms
- Location of Cheminon
- Location within France Location within Grand Est
- Coordinates: 48°44′16″N 4°54′14″E
- Country: France
- Region: Grand Est
- Department: Marne
- Arrondissement: Vitry-le-François
- Canton: Sermaize-les-Bains
- Intercommunality: CA Grand Saint-Dizier, Der et Vallées

Government
  - Mayor (2020–2026): Marie-France Castello
- Area^{1}: 27.6 km^{2} (10.7 sq mi)
- Elevation: 150 m (490 ft)
- Population (2023): 578
  - Density: 20.9/km^{2} (54.2/sq mi)
- Time zone: UTC+01:00 (CET)
  - Summer (DST): UTC+02:00 (CEST)
- INSEE/Postal code: 51144 /51250
- ^{1} French Land Register data, which excludes lakes, ponds, glaciers > 1 km^{2} (0.386 sq mi or 247 acres) and river estuaries.

Cheminon (French pronunciation: [ʃəminɔ̃]) is a commune in the Marne department in north-eastern France.

== See also ==
- Communes of the Marne department
