= Varillas =

Varillas is a surname. Notable people with the surname include:

- Alberto Varillas (1934–2025), Peruvian politician
- Antoine Varillas (1624–1696), French historian
- Gizmo Varillas (born 1990), Spanish songwriter, musician, and record producer
- Juan Pablo Varillas (born 1995), Peruvian tennis player

== See also ==
- Varilla (disambiguation)
