= Stony Fork Junction, Kentucky =

Unincorporated community in Kentucky, United States

Stony Fork Junction
- Unincorporated community
- Location within the state of Kentucky Stony Fork Junction (the United States)
- Coordinates: 36°36′6″N 83°45′8″W
- Country: United States
- State: Kentucky
- County: Bell
- Elevation: 1,181 ft (360 m)
- Time zone: UTC-5 (Eastern (EST))
  - Summer (DST): UTC-4 (EDT)
- GNIS feature ID: 504509

Stony Fork Junction is an unincorporated community located in Bell County, Kentucky, United States.
