= SS Wallsend =

Wallsend was the name of a number of steamships, mostly operated by the Burnett Steamship Co Ltd.

- SS Wallsend (1893), in service from 1893–1915
- SS Wallsend (1899), built for Newcastle Wallsend Co Ltd, in service until 1935
- SS Wallsend (1917), torpedoed and sunk in 1918
- SS Wallsend (1922), wrecked in 1934
- SS Wallsend (1937), torpedoed and sunk in 1942
- SS Wallsend (1943), built as Empire Buttress. In service from 1946–59
