= Ferndale, Kentucky =

Ferndale
- Unincorporated community
- Location within the state of Kentucky Ferndale (the United States)
- Coordinates: 37°12′20″N 84°47′49″W
- Country: United States
- State: Kentucky
- County: Casey
- Elevation: 1,184 ft (361 m)
- Time zone: UTC-6 (Central (CST))
  - Summer (DST): UTC-5 (CST)
- GNIS feature ID: 2568381

Ferndale was an unincorporated community in Casey County, Kentucky, United States. It was also known as Poodle Doo.
