= Meldrum, Bell County, Kentucky =

Unincorporated community in Kentucky, United States

Meldrum
- Unincorporated community
- Location within the state of Kentucky Meldrum (the United States)
- Coordinates: 36°40′1″N 83°41′39″W
- Country: United States
- State: Kentucky
- County: Bell
- Elevation: 1,122 ft (342 m)
- Time zone: UTC-5 (Eastern (EST))
  - Summer (DST): UTC-4 (EDT)
- GNIS feature ID: 498046

Meldrum is an unincorporated community located in Bell County, Kentucky, United States.
