= Clear Creek (Kentucky) =

Stream in Bell County, Kentucky, U.S.

Coordinates: 36.7459187°N 83.6901952°W

Clear Creek is a stream in Bell County, Kentucky, in the United States. It is a tributary of the Cumberland River.

The waters of Clear Creek was said to hold medicinal qualities.

== See also ==
- List of rivers of Kentucky
