= Wasioto, Kentucky =

Unincorporated community in Kentucky, United States

Wasioto
- Unincorporated community
- Location within the state of Kentucky Wasioto (the United States)
- Coordinates: 36°44′51″N 83°41′20″W
- Country: United States
- State: Kentucky
- County: Bell
- Elevation: 1,076 ft (328 m)
- Time zone: UTC-5 (Eastern (EST))
  - Summer (DST): UTC-4 (EST)
- GNIS feature ID: 509320

Wasioto is an unincorporated community located in Bell County, Kentucky, United States.
