= Middlesboro High School =

Location
- 4404 W. Cumberland Ave; Middlesboro, Kentucky 40965; United States
- 36.610275°N 83.755001°W

Information
- School type: Public
- Established: 1890
- School district: Middlesboro Independent Schools
- Superintendent: Waylon Allen
- CEEB code: 181805
- Principal: Bobby Bennett
- Staff: 23 (as of 2008–09)
- Teaching staff: 33 (as of 2008–09)
- Grades: 9-12
- Enrollment: 347 (2023-2024)
- Student to teacher ratio: 12.39
- Hours in school day: 8:10am - 3:15pm, 7 hours
- Colours: Old Gold and White
- Athletics: KHSAA
- Mascot: Yellowjacket
- Rival: Corbin High School, Bell County High School, Harlan County High School
- Accreditation: Southern Association of Colleges and Schools
- Publication: 1920-present
- Newspaper: The Beeline
- Yearbook: First editions called The Pioneer, Booster, Senior Yearbook, and the Yellow Jacket.
- Website: Middlesboro High School

Middlesboro High School (proper name, Middlesborough Senior High School) is a public high school in Middlesboro, Kentucky, United States one of three schools operated by Middlesboro Independent Schools

== History ==
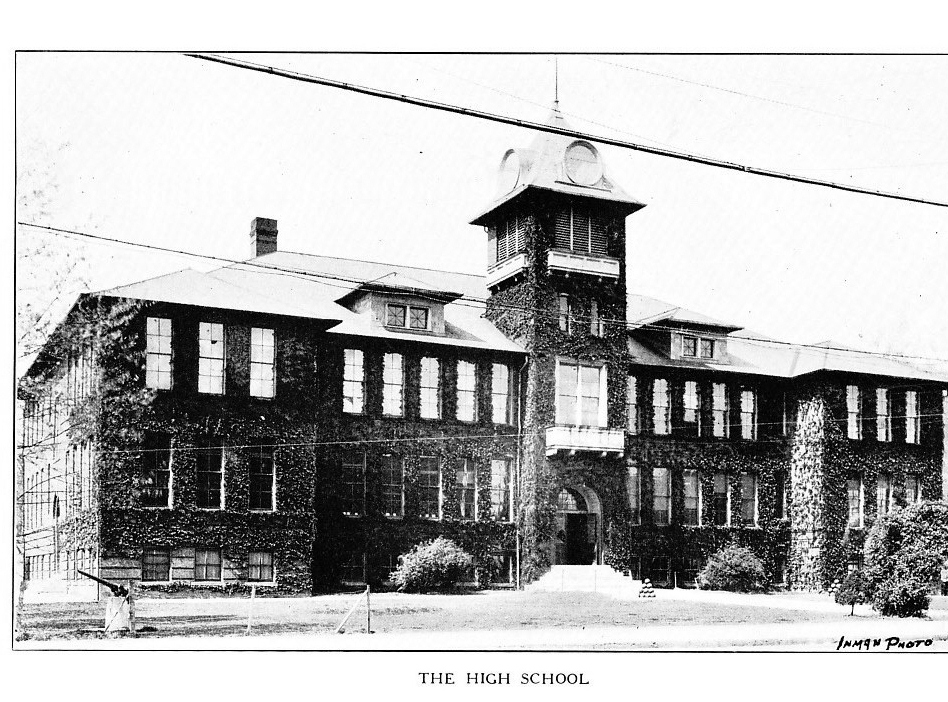
Middlesboro High School/Central School 1921

Middlesboro High School has been educating students for over 120 years. The first class of seniors graduated in 1894 just four years after the founding of Middlesboro in 1890.

There is very little historical information remaining concerning Middlesboro's early educational institutes. In his 1943 book, "The History of Bell County" Henry Harvey Fuson (transcribed by C. Richard Mathews) offers some insight into those early years. He writes:

"The first school in Middlesborough was a private school taught by Ezra L. Grubb, a graduate of Centre College. It was opened December 9, 1889, over Charles Whitaker's store on East Cumberland Avenue. Mr. Grubb was assisted by Mrs. Maggie Chumley and Miss Cora Morris, who taught music and painting."

"On October 17, 1890, the city council passed an ordinance to establish a public school. Mr. Grubb became the first principal, being succeeded by Prof. T. C. Westfall. Following Westfall as principal was C. W. Gordinier from Valparaiso Normal School, who was appointed by the first city board of education. The members of the board were F. D. Hart, W. H. Rhorer, William Acuff, E. K. Pattee, M. Park and Mr. Price. Mr. Hart was elected secretary and manager of the school at fifteen dollars per month."

Fuson further states: "The first class was graduated in 1894, the members being: John Miller, Jennie Dickinson, Julia Moore, Kate Colgan, Louise Park, Mary Campbell, Denta Campbell, Nell Van Gorder, Jess Rhorer, Dora Green, W. A. Purnell and Hattie Broshear." Classes moved to Middlesboro High School (Central) after completion of the new building in 1910."

The first school that opened its doors in 1890 as Middlesborough Public School was likely located on the lower floor of what is now the Masonic Lodge building on 20th Street. Early photographs of the building show a sign that reads "Public School". The Middlesboro school system offices remained in the lower floor rooms until the 1970s.

Dr. Charles H. Gordinier came to Middlesboro and served as principal of its fledgling school system beginning in 1892. His major accomplishment was grading the schools. Dr. Gordinier served as principal teacher from 1892 to 1894 and again in 1895.

Dr. Charles H. Gordinier, Middlesboro's First School Superintendent

Major Campbell was hired as principal teacher for the 1894–95 school year; however, Dr. Gordinier was rehired the following year to replace Campbell.

=== First Superintendent, Dr. Gordinier ===
Dr. Gordinier was named the very first official superintendent of schools in 1896. According to an article in the August 10, 1967 edition of the Middlesboro Daily News, it was during the same time period that a separate high school was formed.

The first principal teacher was Professor Burke H. Kenney. Very little is known of Professor Kenney.

After he was replaced as superintendent in 1896, Dr. Gordinier, founded the Middlesboro University School, or Middlesboro Collegiate Institute, under the direction of Central College. Central College was created after the Presbyterian Church of Kentucky, and with it Centre College, split in 1867.

The "community college" lasted for only a short time; however, reports indicate it was professional and a considerable asset to the community and its students. According to the 1967 Daily News article earlier referenced, the first graduate names were listed in the cornerstone of the Central School with Dr. Gordinier named as superintendent.

Cadet Sterrett in 1891

The Middlesboro University School continued for a short time after the departure of Dr. Gordinier. Professor James Reid Sterrett of Lexington, Virginia served as principal. Reid would serve until his departure to the Augusta Independent School in Augusta, Kentucky in 1901.

Dr. Gordinier later returned to Pennsylvania around 1900 and had a long career in education. He was president of Millersville University from 1918 until 1929 and stayed in the education field well into his 70s.

=== Professor S.L. Frogge ===
Middlesboro's second official school superintendent was Professor Samuel Littleberry Frogge who replaced Dr. Gordinier. He was hired for the 1897–98 school year and ended his time at Middlesboro in 1900.

S.L Frogge, circa 1900

A native of Russellville, Kentucky, professor Frogge was an 1876 Graduate of Bethel College. His contributions to education in Kentucky were numerous. Professor Frogge served as superintendent for a number of Kentucky school districts. He was President of the State Teachers Reading Association at the time of his death in 1907.

=== J.B. Taylor ===
J.B. Taylor served the school system as superintendent from about 1900 until 1902.

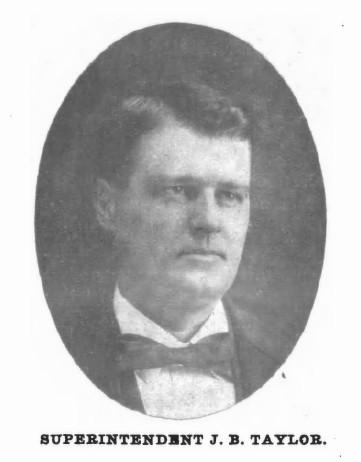
Superintendent J.B. Taylor

A report in Kentucky Public Documents written in 1902 describes the system under Taylor:

"The public schools of Middlesboro were organized in 1891, and have graduated classes every year, except one; that was 1895.

The high school course is the equal of that of any other city in the State of Kentucky of twice its size, being planned after the suggestions of the Committees of Ten and Fifteen. The enrollment for 1900 and 1901 was thirty-six; for 1901 and 1902, twenty six as follows: Four seniors, twelve sophomores, and ten freshmen.

The class of work done this year is superior to that of last year. Penmanship and music under the direction of a special teacher have been added to all the grades and the high school this year. The enrollment last year was five hundred; this year five hundred seventy five."

=== Dr. Oliver Winfrey ===
Another of the early Middlesboro School superintendents was Professor M. Oliver (M.O.) Winfrey. Winfrey excelled in many endeavors having at one time run for Kentucky State Superintendent of Public Instruction.

Professor Winfrey received his MA degree from Kentucky University and his LLD from Georgetown University in Washington D.C.

According to "A History of Kentucky and Kentuckians" by E. Polk Johnson, Winfrey was superintendent from September 1902 until September 1915. He was credited with the building of Middlesborough Central High School in 1906.

Dr. Winfrey was well known throughout the South as one of the region's leading advocates for higher education.

=== The Winfrey Scandal ===
Dr. Winfrey's time in Middlesboro ended in 1915 when he was accused of a criminal operation (illegal abortion) and breach of promise with a former teacher in the district. The allegations filed by Miss Nannie Louise Lynn of Virginia were vehemently denied by Winfrey as blackmail, yet he was indicted. The news of his actions were reported by several state newspapers including a report in The Adair County News of June 9, 1915. The court case, denial of the events, and his subsequent marriage to the young woman, ended Dr. Winfrey's long career in public service and the education field.

The Hopkinsville Kentuckian of June 5, 1915 gives a full report of the incident. The description of the events borders on the bizarre. Miss Lynn stated in the accusation that Winfrey had persuaded her that they had been married during the illegal operation.

Dr. Winfrey died six years later at age 49. His estranged wife Anna whom he had married in 1897, indicated in a 1921 City Directory entry from Louisville, Kentucky that she was the widow of M.O. Winfrey. Mrs. Winfrey reported in other documents obtained by a newspaper that she had divorced Winfrey a few years earlier.

=== Francis Albert Cosgrove ===
Francis Albert F.A. Cosgrove served as superintendent from September 1915 until 1917. He was active in statewide education projects. He served as superintendent in other systems including Jackson City schools in Breathitt County during the 1920s.

== 1920 Shooting of Prof. Bernese ==
On November 5, 1920, student Adolphus Oaks, of no known address fatally shot principal W.J. Bernese, 46, of Louisville over the heart and the bullet was lodged in the spinal column, The motive was thought to have been revenge for Oaks' fourteen-year-old sister, Belma, being whipped a week prior, He was sent to jail

=== Dr. Tybee William Oliver ===
Dr. T.W. Oliver, 1921

Middlesboro High School was listed as a Class A accredited High School as early as 1920 under the direction of superintendent Doctor Tybee William (T.W.) Oliver. Dr. Oliver served as superintendent from 1917 until 1922. Dr. Oliver was born at Sturgis, Kentucky in 1881. After leaving Middlesboro, he was named superintendent of the Pike County Kentucky school system.

In the publication, Catalog of the University of Kentucky 1920–21, Middlesboro Schools are listed as Class A Accredited Public High School under the leadership of Dr. Oliver.

=== Dr. J.W. Bradner ===
Dr. James Wood J.W. Bradner, 1924

One of Middlesboro's most distinguished school superintendents was Dr. James Wood (J.W.) Bradner. A graduate of Tri-State College (BS); Indiana University (AB); Columbia University (MA); and graduate studies at Chicago University, Dr. Bradner was a nationally respected educator and administrator. Under his leadership at Middlesboro beginning in the fall of 1921, the school system was considered the top district in the state. The distinguished Bradner was selected by the Governor of Kentucky to head the Kentucky Department of Education. Dr. Bradner served the school system and community until his sudden death in 1944. As a result of Bradner's devotion and service to Middlesborough public schools, the football stadium located in downtown is named in his honor.

== Buildings ==
Middlesboro High (Central) School, on 20th Street, was completed in 1906. The large brick building housed both the high school and classrooms for downtown area elementary students. With the rapid growth of the city, a separate high school was built in 1920 located one block west of Central School just off South 21st Street.

MHS 1936

Middlesboro High School received accreditation from the Southern Association of Colleges and Schools. in 1929. The classically designed school was located atop a small knoll overlooking downtown Middlesboro for nearly 50 years.

Having played an integral role in thousands of students lives, the aging Central School and the old Middlesboro High School were demolished in the late 1960s after two new racially integrated elementary schools were built in 1965 and a new high school in 1967–68. The city parking lot and Middlesboro's city hall now stand on the old school sites.

Students on parade for a new school in 1965

After several years of agitation by students, and planning by school officials, everyone got their wish when the present Middlesboro High School was constructed in the west end of the city at 4404 West Cumberland Avenue. Completed in the fall of 1968, the state of the art building was one of the finest in the state at the time of its construction. Present day classes are held in the same building as MHS continues its long tradition of providing students with a quality education.

The senior class of 1996 unveiled a framed banner marking 100 years of excellence at Middlesboro High School during the graduation ceremony which is on permanent display in the Central Arts Building.

== School song ==
Middlesboro High School's official fight song was sung at least as far back as March 18, 1915. The Pinnacle News ran a story entitled "St. Patrick's Day at Local Schools". An excerpt from the article reads, "A quartette of girls sang " A Toast To Dear Old Erin" in more than an ordinary manner. Then the entire school gave the Middlesboro Loyalty Song with great gusto." Loyalty lyrics appeared in print for the first time in the 1921 edition of the MHS Senior Yearbook.

Middlesboro Loyalty is performed by the award winning marching band at football and basketball games, parades and at other times when maximum school spirit is required! The music and lyrics are nearly identical to the University of Illinois school song "Illinois Loyalty". However, Middlesboro Loyalty is played at much faster, more rousing tempo.

== Campus ==
Middlesboro High School shares its campus with Middlesboro Middle School. The two schools are separated by the Central Arts Building which provide students with a 900 seat auditorium, a state-of-the-art sound and lighting booth, a visual arts hallway for both middle school and high school art classes, and a performing arts hallway for choir, theater, and instrumental music programs. The facility also contains an Athletic Hall of Fame area in the main lobby. The Central Arts building is used for both school and community events. It is primarily used for theater productions, choir and band concerts, and graduation.

== Arches of Roses ==
A once long lost tradition at Middlesboro High School was "Arches of Roses." Unlike most schools whose graduates march to "Pomp and Circumstance" before the graduation ceremony, MHS chose the song "Arches of Roses." Junior girls, dressed in long formal gowns and silky white gloves, carried arches wrapped in gold and white ribbon covered with roses down the aisles leading the Senior class into the auditorium. This unique tradition has been with MHS since its beginning but had been abandoned in recent graduation ceremonies. However, in 2007, "Arches of Roses" was performed by a group of Seniors to bring the tradition back to Middlesboro High School, and in 2013, "Arches of Roses" once again became an integral part of the graduation ceremonies at MHS.

== Extracurricular activities ==
Middlesboro High School students have the opportunity to participate in academic team, The "Pride of the Cumberlands" Yellow Jacket Band, Beta Club, choir, DECA, drama, FBLA, FCCLA, First Priority, journalism, yearbook staff, newspaper, JROTC, Key Club, National Honor Society, Spanish club, student government, Technology Student Association, Teens Against Tobacco Use, HOSA and VICA.

In December 2012, it was announced that the "Pride of the Cumberlands" was selected outright to represent the state of Kentucky during a halftime show performance at the 2013 Outback Bowl in Tampa, Florida the following month. The last time the band was selected to perform at an event of this magnitude was in 1988 at the Orange Bowl.

== Athletics ==
Middlesboro High School's athletic teams are known as the Yellow Jackets, or Lady Jackets for the girls' teams, and are well known around the state as an athletic powerhouse in many sports. Competition includes football, basketball, cheerleading, cross country, golf, soccer, fast pitch softball, tennis, track and volleyball.

The MHS girls 2005 softball team won the first ever All "A" state softball tournament in Kentucky. The school is also known for repeated appearances by boys and girls in the All "A" Classic state basketball tournament.

Middlesboro High School won the 1998 Kentucky Class A state football championship game. The team defeated Mayfield High School with a score of 27–6.

Dustin Wynn, a former kicker for the MHS football team, set the Kentucky High School Athletic Association's state record for the longest field goal attempt at 57 yards during a game at Harlan High School. The kick was successful, and the record has yet to be broken.

The Middlesboro Yellow Jackets football program is one of the top fifteen winningest programs in the Commonwealth of Kentucky. The team also holds numerous records in other areas of its football program and is one of the most respected high school football programs in Kentucky.

Middlesboro High School also excels on the baseball diamond. Under former coach Bill Powell, the baseball Yellow Jackets grew to become a state powerhouse and is one of the winningest programs in KHSAA history.

Six tennis courts, a football practice field, track, a baseball stadium, a softball stadium, a soccer field, and a marching band practice field are all located on the high school property.

Bradner Stadium, named for former school superintendent James William "J.W." Bradner, is located in downtown Middlesboro on 15th Street and has a seating capacity of 6,000. The field at the stadium is known as Lee Majors Field, named after famous MHS alum and movie star, Harvey "Lee" Yeary. During football season, the street in front of the stadium is painted with the yellow jacket emblem used by the athletic programs.

Fuson Brothers Gymnasium is the home of the Yellow Jackets and Lady Jackets basketball programs. Named for MHS athletic standouts Ig and Ug Fuson, Fuson Brothers Gymnasium features a recently renovated floor featuring new athletic logos, six basketball goals, and two tiers of seating on both sides of the gym.

== Curriculum ==
Middlesboro High School follows Kentucky's Pre-College Curriculum as mandated by Kentucky Education Association. Seniors who wish to pursue a vocational curriculum may attend the Bell County Area Technology Center, which offers programs in auto body repair, automotive technology, carpentry, computer technology, health services, and office technology.

== LPFM radio station construction permit ==
On January 31, 2014, the Middlesboro Board of Education was granted a construction permit by the Federal Communications Commission (FCC) for a new Low Power FM (LPFM) radio station. The transmitter and studios will be located at Middlesboro High School. After construction, the new station will transmit on a frequency of 95.5 MHz with transmitter output of 100 watts. The new station will cover all of Middlesboro and some of the outlying areas. The new stations callsign will be WYJR-LP, for "Yellow Jacket Radio".

== Notable alumni ==
- Lee Majors (class of 1957), television actor. The football field located downtown is named in his honor, Bradner Stadium-Lee Majors Field.
- Susan Kingsley (Susan Cardwell Hurt) (class of 1964), Broadway, stage, motion picture and television actress.
