= Miracle, Bell County, Kentucky =

Unincorporated community in Kentucky, United States

Miracle
- Unincorporated community
- Location within the state of Kentucky Miracle (the United States)
- Coordinates: 36°45′38″N 83°35′3″W
- Country: United States
- State: Kentucky
- County: Bell
- Elevation: 1,073 ft (327 m)
- Time zone: UTC-5 (Eastern (EST))
  - Summer (DST): UTC-4 (EDT)
- ZIP codes: 40856
- GNIS feature ID: 508617

Miracle is an unincorporated community located in Bell County, Kentucky, United States.

The community has the name of the local Miracle family.
