= Blackmont, Kentucky =

Unincorporated community in Kentucky, United States

Blackmont
- Unincorporated community
- Nickname: Lil' Miami
- Location within the state of Kentucky Blackmont (the United States)
- Coordinates: 36°47′30″N 83°31′30″W
- Country: United States
- State: Kentucky
- County: Bell
- Elevation: 1,112 ft (339 m)
- Time zone: UTC-5 (Eastern (EST))
  - Summer (DST): UTC-4 (EST)
- ZIP codes: 40845
- GNIS feature ID: 512641

Blackmont is an unincorporated community in Bell County, Kentucky, United States. At one time it was called Hulen. Its post office is closed.

The community lies on the south side of the Cumberland River and US Route 119 passes the community on the north bank of the Cumberland.
