= Bell County, Kentucky =

County in Kentucky, United States

- County
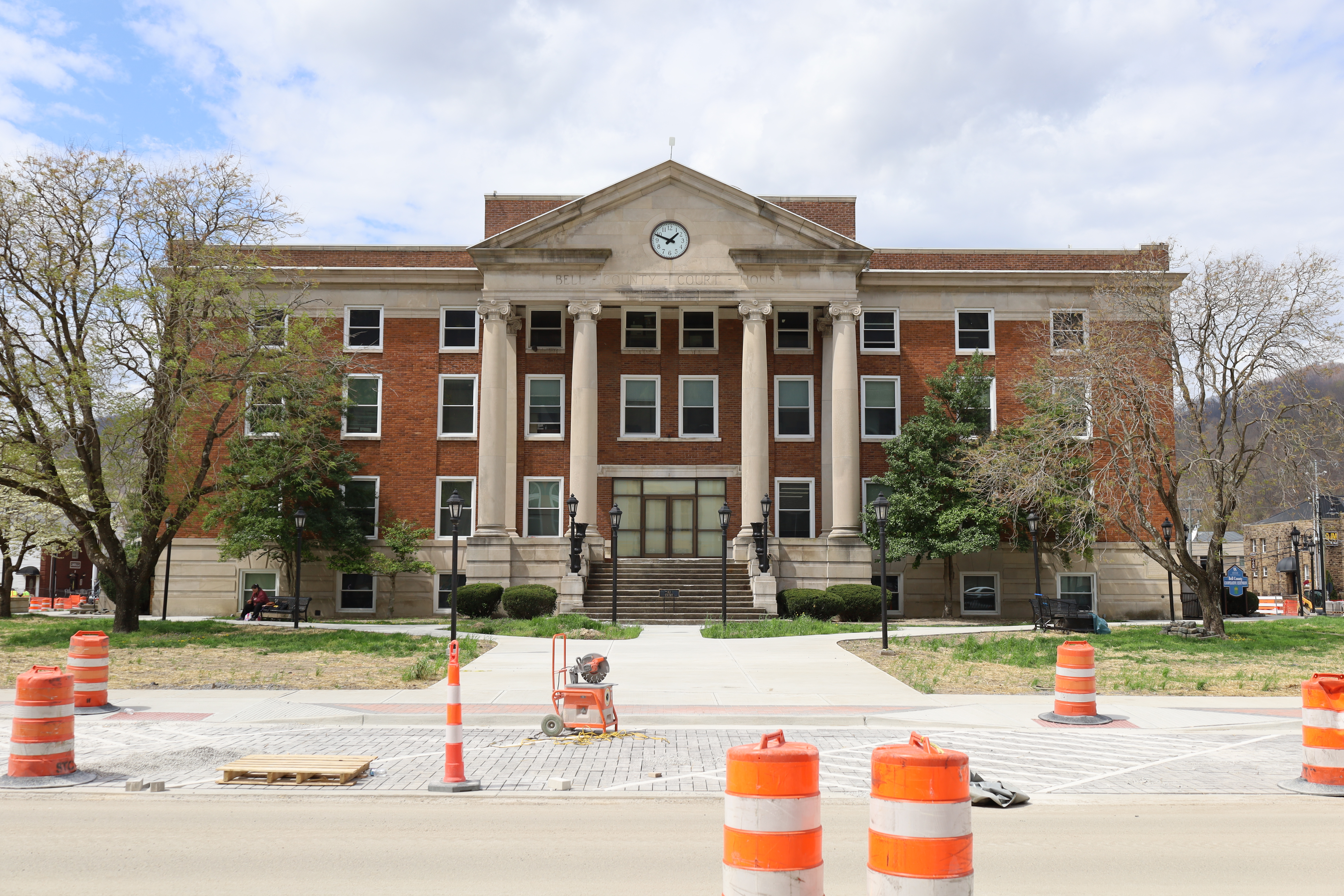
- Bell County Courthouse in Pineville in 2025

- Flag

- Location within the U.S. state of Kentucky
- Coordinates: 36°44′N 83°40′W
- Country: United States
- State: Kentucky
- Founded: February 5, 1867
- Named for: Joshua Fry Bell
- Seat: Pineville
- Largest city: Middlesboro

Government
  - Judge/Executive: Albey Brock (R)

Area
  - Total: 361 sq mi (930 km^{2})
  - Land: 359 sq mi (930 km^{2})
  - Water: 2.1 sq mi (5.4 km^{2}) 0.6%

Population (2020)
  - Total: 24,097
  - Estimate (2025): 22,829 ▼
  - Density: 67.1/sq mi (25.9/km^{2})
- Time zone: UTC−5 (Eastern)
  - Summer (DST): UTC−4 (EDT)
- Congressional district: 5th
- Website: bellcounty.ky.gov

Bell County is a county located in the southeast part of the U.S. state of Kentucky. As of the 2020 census, the population was 24,097. Its county seat is Pineville and its largest city is Middlesboro. The county was formed in 1867, during the Reconstruction era from parts of Knox and Harlan counties and augmented from Knox County in 1872. The county is named for Joshua Fry Bell, a U.S. Representative. It was originally called "Josh Bell County", but on January 31, 1873, the Kentucky legislature shortened the name to "Bell".

== History ==
Bell County is considered a "Moist" county, a classification between dry and wet in terms of alcohol sales. The County changed to moist by a vote in September 2015, that approved alcohol-by-the-drink sales in Middlesboro, Kentucky. On June 23, 2020, Middlesboro voters approved a "wet" status by 1,215 to 653 votes. In a standard dry county, all sales of alcoholic beverages are prohibited. Under ABC terminology, a limited county is an otherwise dry county in which at least one city has approved the sale of alcohol by the drink at restaurants that both seat a state-mandated number of diners and derive no more than 30% of their revenue from alcoholic beverages. In the case of Bell County, Pineville had voted to allow alcohol by the drink in restaurants that seat at least 100 diners. This terminology was used to describe the area until the Middlesboro vote allowed retail sale of alcohol.

The Middlesborough, KY Micropolitan Statistical Area includes all of Bell County.

The Wilderness Road was constructed in 1775 through what is now Bell County.

Bell County was formed in 1867, from portions of Harlan and Knox counties. It was named for Joshua Fry Bell, an attorney and member of Congress. The county courthouse has been thrice destroyed. In 1914 and 1918, it was destroyed by fire and in 1977 nearly destroyed by flooding. The documents stored there were destroyed as well. The flood occurred in April 1977 and although it caused extensive damage, the historical courthouse survived with substantial water damage to the interior.

The community of "South America", now called Frakes, was established in the 1930s. Although some local traditions suggest older origins, there is no historical evidence of Spanish-era settlements or Spanish land grants in what became Kentucky. The area was claimed by France until 1763, when it passed to British control following the Treaty of Paris, and it later became part of Virginia and then the Commonwealth of Kentucky. Like many communities in the Appalachian region, this southeast Kentucky community has a documented history of herbal harvesting and trade in plants such as ginseng and goldenseal; a practice dating back to the late 18th century during the Daniel Boone era.

Bell County has one of the highest ratios of local peace officer deaths of any KY or U.S. county per capita, with 28 deputy sheriffs and 4 county sheriff's K-9 having been killed in the county's history. There has been considerable violence related to the prohibition of alcohol and production of moonshine.

Bell County is the only Kentucky county hosting both a State Park (Pine Mountain State Resort Park) and a National Monument (Cumberland Gap National Historical Park).

== Geography ==
According to the United States Census Bureau, the county has a total area of 361 square miles (930 km^{2}), of which 359 square miles (930 km^{2}) is land and 2.1 square miles (5.4 km^{2}) (0.6%) is water.

=== Adjacent counties ===
- Clay County (north)
- Leslie County (northeast)
- Harlan County (east)
- Lee County, Virginia (southeast)
- Claiborne County, Tennessee (south)
- Whitley County (southwest)
- Knox County (northwest)

=== National protected area ===
- Cumberland Gap National Historical Park (part)
- A portion of the 54,136 acres (21,908 ha) Cumberland Forest WMA sits in the county.

== Demographics ==
Historical population
Census	Pop.	Note	%±
1870	3,731		—
1880	6,055		62.3%
1890	10,312		70.3%
1900	15,701		52.3%
1910	28,447		81.2%
1920	33,988		19.5%
1930	38,747		14.0%
1940	43,812		13.1%
1950	47,602		8.7%
1960	35,336		−25.8%
1970	31,121		−11.9%
1980	34,330		10.3%
1990	31,506		−8.2%
2000	30,060		−4.6%
2010	28,691		−4.6%
2020	24,097		−16.0%
2025 (est.)	22,829	▼	−5.3%
U.S. Decennial Census; 1790-1960 1900-1990; 1990-2000 2010-2020

=== 2020 census ===
As of the 2020 census, the county had a population of 24,097. The median age was 42.4 years. 21.2% of residents were under the age of 18 and 19.2% of residents were 65 years of age or older. For every 100 females there were 96.4 males, and for every 100 females age 18 and over there were 95.1 males age 18 and over.

The racial makeup of the county was 92.9% White, 2.3% Black or African American, 0.2% American Indian and Alaska Native, 0.5% Asian, 0.0% Native Hawaiian and Pacific Islander, 0.6% from some other race, and 3.5% from two or more races. Hispanic or Latino residents of any race comprised 1.0% of the population.

40.7% of residents lived in urban areas, while 59.3% lived in rural areas.

There were 9,928 households in the county, of which 28.3% had children under the age of 18 living with them and 32.4% had a female householder with no spouse or partner present. About 31.6% of all households were made up of individuals and 14.0% had someone living alone who was 65 years of age or older.

There were 11,517 housing units, of which 13.8% were vacant. Among occupied housing units, 62.4% were owner-occupied and 37.6% were renter-occupied. The homeowner vacancy rate was 1.9% and the rental vacancy rate was 8.9%.

=== 2000 census ===
As of the census of 2000, there were 30,060 people, 12,004 households, and 8,522 families residing in the county. The population density was 83 per square mile (32/km^{2}). There were 13,341 housing units at an average density of 37 per square mile (14/km^{2}). The racial makeup of the county was 96.02% White, 2.40% Black or African American, 0.25% Native American, 0.35% Asian, 0.03% Pacific Islander, 0.12% from other races, and 0.83% from two or more races. 0.65% of the population were Hispanic or Latino of any race.

There were 12,004 households, out of which 31.90% had children under the age of 18 living with them, 51.00% were married couples living together, 15.70% had a female householder with no husband present, and 29.00% were non-families. 26.80% of all households were made up of individuals, and 11.40% had someone living alone who was 65 years of age or older. The average household size was 2.44 and the average family size was 2.95.

The age distribution was 24.40% under the age of 18, 9.00% from 18 to 24, 28.70% from 25 to 44, 24.20% from 45 to 64, and 13.70% who were 65 years of age or older. The median age was 37 years. For every 100 females there were 91.60 males. For every 100 females age 18 and over, there were 88.00 males.

The median income for a household in the county was $19,057, and the median income for a family was $23,818. Males had a median income of $24,521 versus $19,975 for females. The per capita income for the county was $11,526. About 26.70% of families and 31.10% of the population were below the poverty line, including 42.00% of those under age 18 and 21.80% of those age 65 or over.

== Politics ==
United States presidential election results for Bell County, Kentucky
Year	Republican		Democratic		Third party(ies)	
Year	No.	%	No.	%	No.	%
1912	1,183	29.74%	970	24.38%	1,825	45.88%
1916	3,321	69.67%	1,373	28.80%	73	1.53%
1920	6,691	74.23%	2,277	25.26%	46	0.51%
1924	5,371	68.02%	2,166	27.43%	359	4.55%
1928	6,570	71.84%	2,551	27.90%	24	0.26%
1932	4,695	45.97%	5,440	53.27%	78	0.76%
1936	4,573	43.71%	5,853	55.95%	35	0.33%
1940	4,962	45.53%	5,910	54.23%	27	0.25%
1944	4,822	50.90%	4,616	48.72%	36	0.38%
1948	4,327	42.37%	5,708	55.89%	178	1.74%
1952	6,461	54.94%	5,276	44.86%	24	0.20%
1956	6,824	60.29%	4,477	39.55%	18	0.16%
1960	6,805	56.77%	5,181	43.23%	0	0.00%
1964	4,185	37.28%	6,979	62.16%	63	0.56%
1968	4,905	47.74%	4,138	40.27%	1,232	11.99%
1972	6,518	66.06%	3,219	32.62%	130	1.32%
1976	5,035	48.03%	5,284	50.41%	164	1.56%
1980	5,433	44.95%	6,362	52.63%	293	2.42%
1984	7,249	55.93%	5,490	42.36%	222	1.71%
1988	5,759	51.45%	5,182	46.30%	252	2.25%
1992	4,501	38.89%	5,745	49.63%	1,329	11.48%
1996	3,917	39.14%	5,058	50.54%	1,033	10.32%
2000	5,585	52.63%	4,787	45.11%	239	2.25%
2004	6,722	61.10%	4,210	38.27%	70	0.64%
2008	6,681	69.61%	2,782	28.99%	135	1.41%
2012	7,127	75.16%	2,224	23.45%	131	1.38%
2016	7,764	79.89%	1,720	17.70%	234	2.41%
2020	8,140	81.04%	1,789	17.81%	115	1.14%
2024	7,831	83.84%	1,419	15.19%	90	0.96%

A rather politically mixed county in most of the 20th century, Bell has become solidly Republican as the 21st century has progressed, going from giving George W. Bush a narrow victory in 2000 to rewarding Donald Trump with nearly 84% of the vote in 2024.

=== Elected officials ===
Elected officials as of January 3, 2025
U.S. House	Hal Rogers (R)	KY 5
Ky. Senate	Scott Madon (R)	29
Ky. House	Adam Bowling (R)	87

== Education ==
Three public school districts operate in the county:

=== Bell County School District ===
The largest of the three in enrollment and by far the largest in geographic scope. The Bell County Schools operates six mainstream K–8 "school centers", one alternative school, one high school, and a newly commissioned technology center built to replace the aging vocational center. It is located on the high school campus and the buildings are connected by an elevated, enclosed walkway. The new technology center is also slated to house the County Board of Education pending its move from their office in the city of Pineville building. Lone Jack High School (in Fourmile) and the old Bell County High School were consolidated into Bell County High School in the early 1980s.

=== Middlesboro Independent Schools ===
The second-largest of the three, with boundaries coinciding exactly with the corporate limits of Middlesboro. The district operates one elementary school, one middle school, and one high school. The two elementary schools are separate facilities that share the same campus design (both schools are designed in an "X" shape), and the middle and high schools are separate facilities on one campus on the west side of town. In recent years Middlesboro Independent Schools has leased the X-shaped building formerly used as East End Intermediate to a local church.

=== Pineville Independent Schools ===
The county's smallest district; its boundaries generally, but do not exactly, follow the corporate limits of Pineville. The district operates Pineville School; An elementary, middle, and high school.

== Communities ==
=== Cities ===
- Middlesboro (also spelled Middlesborough)
- Pineville (county seat)

=== Census-designated place ===
- Arjay

=== Other unincorporated communities ===
- Beverly
- Black Snake
- Blackmont
- Colmar
- Cubage
- Field
- Fonde
- Fourmile
- Frakes
- Harbell
- Hutch
- Ingram
- Jaybel
- Jenson
- Keenox
- Kettle Island
- Meldrum
- Miracle
- Mocking Bird Branch
- Noetown
- Oaks
- Olcott
- Ponza
- Premier
- Pruden‡
- Red Oak
- Rella
- Stoney Fork
- Stony Fork Junction
- Sugar Run
- Tejay
- Timsley
- Tuggleville
- Varilla
- Wallsend
- Wasioto
- Flatshoales

== Notable people ==
- George Samuel Hurst
- Lee Majors
- Dale Ann Bradley

== See also ==
- Dry county
- Hensley Settlement
- Middlesborough, KY Micropolitan Statistical Area
- National Register of Historic Places listings in Bell County, Kentucky
