= Kentucky Route 699 =

State highway in Kentucky, United States

Kentucky Route 699
- KY 699 highlighted in red

Route information
- Maintained by KYTC
- Length: 27.731 mi (44.629 km)

Major junctions
- South end: KY 80 near Wooton
- KY 221 near Leatherwood; KY 463 near Leatherwood
- North end: KY 7 near Cornettsville

Location
- Country: United States
- State: Kentucky
- Counties: Leslie, Perry

Highway system
- Kentucky State Highway System; Interstate; US; State; Parkways
← KY 698	→ KY 700

Kentucky Route 699 (KY 699) is a 27.731-mile-long (44.629 km) state highway in southeastern Leslie County and southern Perry County, Kentucky, that runs from KY 80 south of Wooton to KY 7 southwest of Cornettsville via Smilax, Cutshin, Yeaddiss, and Slemp.

== Major intersections ==
County	Location	mi	km	Destinations	Notes
Leslie		0.000	0.000	KY 80	Western terminus
Leslie		2.060	3.315	KY 3427 south (Coon Creek Road)	Northern terminus of KY 3427
Leslie	Smilax	3.153	5.074	KY 2057 east (Polls Creek Road)	Western terminus of KY 2057
Leslie		12.776	20.561	KY 3427 north (Wolf Creek Road)	Southern terminus of KY 3427
Leslie		15.956	25.679	KY 221 west	Eastern terminus of KY 221
Perry		20.359	32.765	KY 463 south	Northern terminus of KY 463
Perry		27.731	44.629	KY 3348 south (Little Leatherwood Creek Road)	Northern terminus of KY 3348
Perry		27.731	44.629	KY 7 – Whitesburg, Hazard	Eastern terminus
1.000 mi = 1.609 km; 1.000 km = 0.621 mi
