= National Register of Historic Places listings in Leslie County, Kentucky =

Location of Leslie County in Kentucky

This is a list of the National Register of Historic Places listings in Leslie County, Kentucky.

It is intended to be a complete list of the properties on the National Register of Historic Places in Leslie County, Kentucky, United States. The locations of National Register properties for which the latitude and longitude coordinates are included below, may be seen in a map.

There are 5 properties listed on the National Register in the county, including 1 National Historic Landmark.

This National Park Service list is complete through NPS recent listings posted December 12, 2025.

== Current listings ==
	Name on the Register	Image	Date listed	Location	City or town	Description
1	Frontier Nursing Service	Frontier Nursing Service	January 11, 1991 (#90002126)	Hospital Hill, off Hickory St. 37°09′55″N 83°22′45″W	Hyden	
2	Roderick McIntosh Farm	Roderick McIntosh Farm	November 7, 1991 (#91001666)	South of Dry Hill-McIntosh Rd. on the confluence of McIntosh and Cutshin Creeks; 37°12′21″N 83°20′13″W	Dryhill	
3	John Shell Cabin	John Shell Cabin	November 12, 1975 (#75000791)	South of Chappell on Greasy Creek Road (Kentucky Route 2009); 36°58′42″N 83°19′36″W	Chappell	
4	Wendover	Wendover	October 21, 1975 (#75000792)	South of Hyden off Kentucky Route 80; 37°07′39″N 83°21′55″W	Hyden	
5	Wooton Presbyterian Center	Wooton Presbyterian Center	May 24, 1979 (#79001019)	Kentucky Route 80; 37°10′51″N 83°18′07″W	Wooton	

== See also ==
- List of National Historic Landmarks in Kentucky
- National Register of Historic Places listings in Kentucky
