= Frew =

Frew may refer to:

== People ==
=== Given name ===
- Frew McMillan, a professional male tennis player from South Africa

=== Surname ===
- Frew (surname)

== Other ==
- Frew, Kentucky
- Frew, West Virginia
- Frew River, the Northern Territory of Australia
- Bridge of Frew, Ford of Frew, North Mid Frew, South Mid Frew, Wester Frew. Area on the upper River Forth west of Stirling, Scotland.
- Frew Publications, publishes Lee Falk's The Phantom comic in Australia
