= Gulf of Tonkin Resolution =

1964 joint resolution by the US Congress

- Long title: A joint resolution "To promote the maintenance of international peace and security in southeast Asia."
- Nicknames: Southeast Asia Resolution
- Enacted by: the 88th United States Congress
- Effective: August 10, 1964

Citations
- Public law: Pub. L. 88–408
- Statutes at Large: 78 Stat. 384

Legislative history
- Introduced in the House as H.J.Res. 1145; Passed the House on August 7, 1964 (416-0); Passed the Senate on August 7, 1964 (88-2); Signed into law by President Lyndon B. Johnson on August 10, 1964

The Gulf of Tonkin Resolution or the Southeast Asia Resolution, Pub. L. 88–408, 78 Stat. 384, enacted August 10, 1964, was a joint resolution that the United States Congress passed on August 7, 1964, in response to the Gulf of Tonkin incident.

It is of historic significance because it gave U.S. president Lyndon B. Johnson authorization, without a formal declaration of war by Congress, to use conventional military force in Southeast Asia. Specifically, the resolution authorized the president to do whatever necessary in order to assist "any member or protocol state of the Southeast Asia Collective Defense Treaty." This included involving armed forces.

It was opposed in the Senate only by Senators Wayne Morse (D-OR) and Ernest Gruening (D-AK). Senator Gruening objected to "sending our American boys into combat in a war in which we have no business, which is not our war, into which we have been misguidedly drawn, which is steadily being escalated." The Johnson administration subsequently relied upon the resolution to begin its rapid escalation of U.S. military involvement in South Vietnam and open warfare between North Vietnam and the United States.

== Towards the incident ==
In March 1956, the North Vietnamese leadership approved tentative measures to revive the southern insurgency in December 1956. A communist-led uprising began against Diem's government in April 1957. The North Vietnamese Communist Party approved a "people's war" on the South at a session in January 1959, and on July 28, North Vietnamese forces invaded Laos to maintain and upgrade the Ho Chi Minh trail, in support of insurgents in the south. In September 1960, COSVN, North Vietnam's southern headquarters, gave an order for a full scale coordinated uprising by the Viet Cong in South Vietnam against the government and 1/3 of the population was soon living in areas of communist control. About 40,000 communist soldiers infiltrated from North Vietnam into the south from 1961 to 1963.

Throughout 1963, the administration of U.S. president John F. Kennedy was concerned that the South Vietnamese regime of Ngo Dinh Diem was losing the war to the North Vietnamese directed Viet Cong. Such concerns were intensified after Diem was overthrown and killed in a CIA-supported coup on 2 November 1963. On 19 December 1963, the Defense Secretary Robert McNamara visited Saigon and reported to President Lyndon B. Johnson that the situation was "very disturbing" as "current trends, unless reversed in the next two or three months, will lead to neutralization at best or more likely to a Communist-controlled state." McNamara further reported that the Viet Cong were winning the war as they controlled "larger percentages of the population, greater amounts of territory and have destroyed or occupied more strategic hamlets than expected." About the Revolutionary Command Council as the South Vietnamese military junta called itself, McNamara was scathing, saying "there is no organized government in South Vietnam" as the junta was "indecisive and drifting" with the generals being "so preoccupied with essentially political affairs" that they had no time for the war.

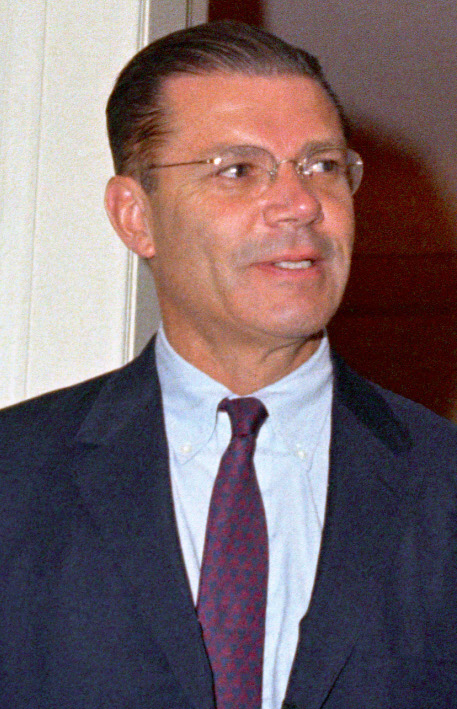
United States Secretary of Defense Robert McNamara in 1964

In response to McNamara's report, the Joint Chiefs of Staff recommended the United States intervene in the war, with the Air Force's commander, General Curtis LeMay, calling for a strategic bombing campaign against North Vietnam, saying "we are swatting flies when we should be going after the manure pile." Using less earthy language than LeMay, the chairman of the Joint Chiefs of Staff, General Maxwell D. Taylor in a report to Johnson called South Vietnam "pivotal" to the United States's "worldwide confrontation with Communism" and predicted that to allow South Vietnam to fall to the Viet Cong would be such a blow to American "durability, resolution and trustworthiness" that all of Asia might very well be lost to Communism. Taylor also argued that to see South Vietnam fall to the Viet Cong would so damage "our image" in Africa and Latin America that both of those regions might also be lost to Communism as well. Given these stakes, with Taylor construing that the entire Third World would be lost to Communism if South Vietnam went Communist, he argued for drastic measures, saying the United States should be taking "increasing bolder" measures with the United States to start bombing North Vietnam. The journalist Stanley Karnow wrote Taylor had offered up an "inflated" version of the "domino theory" with the entire Third World potentially lost to Communism if South Vietnam became the first "domino" to fall.

Though Johnson was planning as president to focus on domestic affairs such as civil rights for Afro-Americans together with social legislation to improve the lot of the poor, he was very afraid that to "lose" South Vietnam would cause him to be branded as "soft on Communism", the dreaded accusation that could end the career of any American politician at the time. Rather than the primat der aussenpolitik (primacy of foreign policy) reason of the "domino theory", Johnson was more motivated by the primat der innenpolitik (primacy of domestic policy) reason of the fear that if South Vietnam was "lost", it would generate a right-wing backlash similar to the one generated by the "loss of China" in 1949, which allowed Senator Joseph McCarthy to achieve national prominence. The fear that a new McCarthy-type Republican politician would emerge and derail his domestic reforms was Johnson's primary reason for refusing to accept the possibility of South Vietnam being "lost". Johnson's determination to not "lose" South Vietnam extended to rejecting a peace plan put forward by the French president Charles de Gaulle who favored having South Vietnam becoming neutral in the Cold War in order to provide Americans with an honorable way to disengage from Vietnam. Though not keen on fighting a war in Vietnam, Johnson told Taylor and the other chiefs of staff at a Christmas Eve party in 1963: "Just let me get elected, and then you can have your war". The instability of South Vietnamese politics suggested it was impossible for the ARVN (Army of the Republic of Vietnam-i.e. the South Vietnamese Army) to focus on the war. Johnson stated at a meeting in the Oval Office that he was fed up with "this coup shit", and shortly thereafter another coup took place in Saigon as General Nguyễn Khánh overthrew General Dương Văn Minh on 30 January 1964.

Though the United States had long denounced the North Vietnamese government for trying to overthrow the South Vietnamese government, accusing Hanoi of "aggression", South Vietnam, with American support, had also been trying to overthrow the North Vietnamese government. Starting in 1961, the Central Intelligence Agency (CIA) had been training squads of South Vietnamese volunteers and infiltrating them into North Vietnam with the aim of starting an anti-Communist guerrilla war with a lack of success. For an example, of the 80 teams that were infiltrated into North Vietnam in 1963, all were captured, causing one CIA agent to later say: "I didn't mind butchering the enemy, but we were butchering our own allies". In January 1964, Johnson gave his approval for a plan to step up the pace and intensity of the covert war against North Vietnam, which was code-named Operation 34A. Johnson had hopes that Operation 34A might at best lead to the overthrow of North Vietnam's Communist government and at worse might so weaken North Vietnam as to end the war in South Vietnam. As part of Operation 34A, starting on 1 February 1964, South Vietnamese commandos began to conduct maritime raids on coastal North Vietnam under American naval operational command.

The new Khánh government proved to be just as ineffective as the previous Minh government had been in fighting the war. In February 1964, Lyman Kirkpatrick, the CIA's Inspector General, visited South Vietnam and reported that he was "shocked by the number of our people and of the military, even those whose job is always to say that we are winning, who feel the tide is against us". The general consensus among American Vietnam experts by early 1964 was as one official wrote "unless there is a marked improvement in the effectiveness of the South Vietnamese government and armed forces" that South Vietnam had only "an even chance of withstanding the insurgency menace during the next few weeks or months". Publicly the Johnson administration still ruled out American intervention, but in private Johnson was inclined to listen to the advice of McNamara and Taylor who advised him that only American military intervention could save South Vietnam now as the feuding generals of the Revolutionary Command Council was simply too disunited, too corrupt and too incompetent to win the war.

== Drafting ==
In February 1964, Walt Whitman Rostow, director of the State Department's Policy Planning Staff, pointed out a major constitutional problem with the plans to commit American forces to Vietnam, noting under the American constitution only Congress had the power to declare war. Johnson had made it clear that he was opposed to Khánh's plans to have South Vietnam invade North Vietnam out of the fear of causing a war with China, and he had even less enthusiasm for the United States invading North Vietnam. To have the U.S. declare war on North Vietnam would lead to immense domestic pressure to invade North Vietnam. Johnson remembered how in 1950 the approach of U.S. forces upon the Yalu led to Chinese intervention in the Korean War, and was fearful that invading North Vietnam would again lead to Chinese intervention. Moreover, unlike in 1950, by 1964 China had nuclear weapons. To resolve this problem, Rostow suggested to Johnson that Congress pass a resolution authorizing Johnson to use force in Vietnam.

Rostow was supported by William Bundy, assistant secretary for Asia, who advised Johnson in a memo on 1 March 1964 that the U.S Navy should blockade Haiphong and start bombing North Vietnam's railroads, factories, road and training camps. Bundy stated that the plans for stepped-up U.S involvement would "normally require" a declaration of war from Congress. Bundy advised against the "blunt instrument" of a declaration of war as at present Johnson still had only "selective goals" in Vietnam, but stated that it would be "unsatisfactory" to have Congress not endorse the planned increased involvement in Vietnam for constitutional reasons. Bundy argued that the "best answer" to this problem was an event from Johnson's own career as a Senator when, in January 1955, he voted for the Formosa Resolution giving President Eisenhower the power to use military force "as he deems necessary" to protect Taiwan from a Chinese invasion. At the time, the Taiwan Strait Crisis was raging with the Chinese Communists bombarding several islands in the Taiwan strait still held by the Kuomintang regime in Taiwan, and many believed the congressional resolution giving Eisenhower the legal power to go to war in defense of Taiwan had ended the crisis.

Unlike the 1955 resolution, which Johnson had supported as Senate Majority Leader and used all of his influence to get the other senators to vote for, the current Senate Majority Leader, Mike Mansfield, was known to be skeptical about using American forces to support South Vietnam. Mansfield, a devout Catholic who was only willing to support wars that met the Catholic definition of a "just war", had once been one of South Vietnam's warmest supporters on Capital Hill, but after visiting South Vietnam in late 1962 came back very disillusioned by what he had seen, stating the regime was just as tyrannical as the Viet Cong guerrillas fighting to overthrow it. In addition to Mansfield, Bundy predicted problems from Senator Wayne Morse, a stubborn and cantankerous character who was known for his strongly held view that only Congress had power to declare war, and who deeply disliked resolutions like the Formosa resolution as weakening the power of Congress. Bundy warned the president that his "doubtful friends" in Congress might delay the passage of the desired resolution which would give America's European allies opposed to a war in Southeast Asia the chance to impose "tremendous pressure" on the U.S. "to stop and negotiate".

McNamara visited South Vietnam for four days starting on 8 March 1964, and upon his return to Washington was even more pessimistic than he been before in December 1963. McNamara reported to Johnson the situation had "unquestionably been growing worse" since his last visit in December as 40% of the countryside was now under Vietcong "control or predominant influence". McNamara further reported that desertion rate in the ARVN was "high and increasing"; the Vietcong were "recruiting energetically"; the South Vietnamese people were overcome by "apathy and indifference"; and the "greatest weakness" was the "uncertain viability" of Khánh regime which might be overthrown by another coup at any moment. In response to McNamara's report, the National Security Council issued an "action memorandum" calling for increased military aid to South Vietnam and asserted that Vietnam was a "test case" of American global leadership, claiming that a Communist victory in South Vietnam would so damage American prestige that none of America's allies would believe in American promises if South Vietnam was "lost". By presenting the Vietnam war in these stark terms with the melodramatic claim that the United States would cease to be a world power if South Vietnam was "lost", the "action memorandum" virtually guaranteed American intervention.

At the time, Morse was one of the few critics of Johnson's Vietnam policy. In a speech in April 1964, Morse called the war "McNamara's War", claiming: "Not one voice has yet answered my contention that the United States, under the leadership of Defense Secretary McNamara, is fighting an illegal and unwise war in Vietnam." Morse remained outspoken in his criticism of Johnson's Vietnam policy, accusing him of violating international law. On 13 May 1964, Bundy called a meeting to discuss how best to deal with Morse. Jonathan Moore, an aide to Bundy advised him that Morse was correct that the administration was "on pretty thin ice" when it came to advocating escalation on the basis of international law. As it was felt that Morse was strong on the legalistic arguments, Moore recommended that the administration "shift gears rapidly into a general (practical and political) rationale" and ignore Morse as much as possible. Bundy believed the resolution would give Johnson "the full support of the school of thought headed by Senator Mansfield and Senator Aiken and leave ourselves with die-hard opposition only from Senator Morse and his very few cohorts."

On 27 May 1964, Johnson invited his mentor, Senator Richard Russell Jr. to the Oval Office for a discussion about Vietnam that, unknown to the latter, he recorded. Russell predicted that American involvement in Vietnam would lead to a war with China, saying "it's the damned worst mess I ever saw" and South Vietnam was "not important a damned bit". Johnson stated that his experts believed that China would not enter the war, but commented the experts had said the same thing in 1950. Johnson noted that according to most polls 63% of Americans did not know or care about Vietnam; those who did were making an issue of the 35 American advisers killed fighting in Vietnam so far in 1964. Russell noted that more Americans were killed in car accidents in Atlanta than had been killed in Vietnam but warned that public opinion could change if more Americans were killed. Russell dismissed the American ambassador to South Vietnam, Henry Cabot Lodge Jr., as too arrogant, saying "He's thinks he's dealing with barbarian tribes out there. And he's the emperor and he's just going to tell them what to do. There's no doubt in my mind that he had ol'Diem killed out there". Johnson called the coup that saw the Ngo brothers killed "a tragic mistake", which he blamed on Lodge. Russell suggested making Lodge into the "fall guy" for the failures of South Vietnam and urged Johnson to send an expert who was "not scared to death of McNamara" to go to South Vietnam to recommend a withdrawal, saying preferably the expert should be a war hero from World War Two, suggesting Omar Bradley or Lucius D. Clay as possible candidates. Johnson was intrigued by Russell's suggestion, but then changed the subject by calling Mansfield a "Milquetoast with no spine", saying contemptuously of Manfield's plans for an international conference to settle the Vietnam war: "Conferences aint' going to do a damn bit of good". Russell warned Johnson against relying too much on McNamara, saying: "McNamara is the smartest fella any of us know. But he's got so much-he's opinionated as hell-and he's made up his mind". Johnson expressed his confidence in McNamara, saying he was the most intelligent man he knew and said he was trying to buy time until the elections were over in November before deciding what to do. However, he complained: "But those politicians got to raising hell, and Scripps-Howard writing these stories, and all the Senators, and Nixon, Rockefeller and Goldwater--let's move, let's go in the North". After discussing the failure of the bombing campaign against North Korea in the Korean war, both men agreed that North Vietnam would not be defeated by strategic bombing. Johnson concluded: "Well, they'd impeach a president that runs out, wouldn't they? Outside of Morse, everybody says you got to go in".

By late May 1964, a rough draft of the resolution that was to become the Gulf of Tonkin resolution had been completed by Bundy which, if passed by Congress, would give Johnson the legal power to use force to defend any nation in Southeast Asia threatened by "Communist aggression or subversion". By the beginning of June 1964, the final draft of the resolution had been completed and all that remained to do was to submit it to Congress. The acting Attorney General, Nicholas Katzenbach, called resolution the "functional equivalent of a declaration of war". The U.S Air Force had already selected 94 sites in North Vietnam to be bombed while the U.S. Navy had moved a carrier task force into the Gulf of Tonkin with the orders to be prepared for "reprisal bombings" of North Vietnam. Initially, the plans called for the United States to respond to guerrilla attacks in South Vietnam with bombing raids over North Vietnam, and then Johnson would submit the resolution to Congress sometime in late June 1964. At the time, Congress was preoccupied with the Civil Rights Act, which was intended to outlaw segregation, a bill that Johnson had supported and was met with fierce resistance from Southern senators and congressmen who did everything within their power to "kill the bill". Johnson wanted the Civil Rights Act passed before submitting the resolution to Congress. On 15 June 1964, National Security Adviser McGeorge Bundy told the National Security Council that the president did not feel that Viet Cong attacks on the South Vietnamese government were a sufficient casus belli as Johnson wanted a North Vietnamese attack on American forces as his casus belli, arguing that Congress would be more likely to pass the resolution if it was in response to the latter rather than the former. On 18 June 1964, the Canadian diplomat J. Blair Seaborn, who served as Canada's representative on the International Control Commission, arrived in Hanoi carrying a secret message from Johnson that North Vietnam would suffer the "greatest devastation" from American bombing if it continued on its present course. Towards the end of June, Johnson asked Secretary of State Dean Rusk to provide a legal basis for the United States to fight in Vietnam, and he suggested the SEATO treaty would be sufficient. In June 1964, the American ambassador in Saigon, Henry Cabot Lodge, resigned in order to seek the Republican nomination for president. Johnson appointed Taylor as the new ambassador with orders to make the South Vietnamese fight. Taylor's successor as Chairman of the Joint Chiefs of Staff was General Earle "Bus" Wheeler.

== The Gulf of Tonkin incident ==
Soviet-North Vietnamese relations had become badly strained in the early 1960s as North Vietnam moved closer to China, the more militant and aggressive of the two warring Communist giants. When Mao Zedong denounced Nikita Khrushchev for his "cowardice" for choosing a diplomatic compromise to settle the Cuban Missile Crisis of 1962 instead of a nuclear war against the United States as Mao preferred, North Vietnamese newspapers approvingly cited his remarks. Likewise, when Khrushchev signed the Partial Nuclear Test Ban Treaty in 1963, Mao again mocked him for his moderation, and was again approvingly quoted by North Vietnamese newspapers. In a bid to recapture influence lost to China, the Soviet Union sold North Vietnam a radar system that was far more advanced than anything China could produce together with batteries of SAMs (surface-to-air missiles). All through the spring and summer of 1964, Soviet workers were building and installing radar stations together with SAM batteries all over North Vietnam while training the North Vietnamese in their use. As the U.S. Air Force and Navy were developing their plans at the same time to bomb North Vietnam, both the admirals and Air Force generals insisted that they needed more information about the radar network the Soviets were installing, most notably the frequencies the radar used in order to develop jamming mechanisms. As a result, the U.S. Navy began to increase DESOTO patrols off the coast of North Vietnam. The Navy's tactic was to have South Vietnamese commandos land to attack the North Vietnamese radar stations, forcing the operators to turn on the radars, which thereby allowed the Americans to learn what frequencies they used. The South Vietnamese commandos were landed in light, Norwegian-built patrol boats made of aluminium and armed with machine guns and cannons known as the Swift boats.

By July 1964, the rugged coastline of North Vietnam with its islands, bays, and estuaries was a war zone with South Vietnamese commandos constantly landing to raid while the North Vietnamese made vigorous efforts to stop the raids. In support of the raids, an American destroyer, the USS Maddox was deployed to the Gulf of Tonkin with orders to collect electronic intelligence on the North Vietnamese radar system. Admiral U. S. Grant Sharp Jr., the commander of the Pacific fleet ordered Captain John J. Herrick of the Maddox not to go any closer than 8 miles from the coast of North Vietnam and no more than 4 miles from any of the archipelagos off the coast. The French had claimed control of only 3 miles of the waters off the coastline of Indochina, a claim that North Vietnam had inherited. Subsequently, the North Vietnamese had extended their claim to control of waters 12 miles off their coastline, a claim the United States had declined to recognize. On 30 July 1964, South Vietnamese commandos tried to attack the North Vietnamese radar station on the island of Hon Me, but were detected as they were coming in, leading the North Vietnamese to open fire, making any landing impossible. The radar on Hon Me was turned on, and the Maddox stationed off the coast picked up the radar frequency being used. North Vietnam made a formal protest about the raid to the International Control Commission consisting of delegations of diplomats from India, Canada and Poland that were supposed to enforce the Geneva Accords, accusing the United States of being behind the raid.

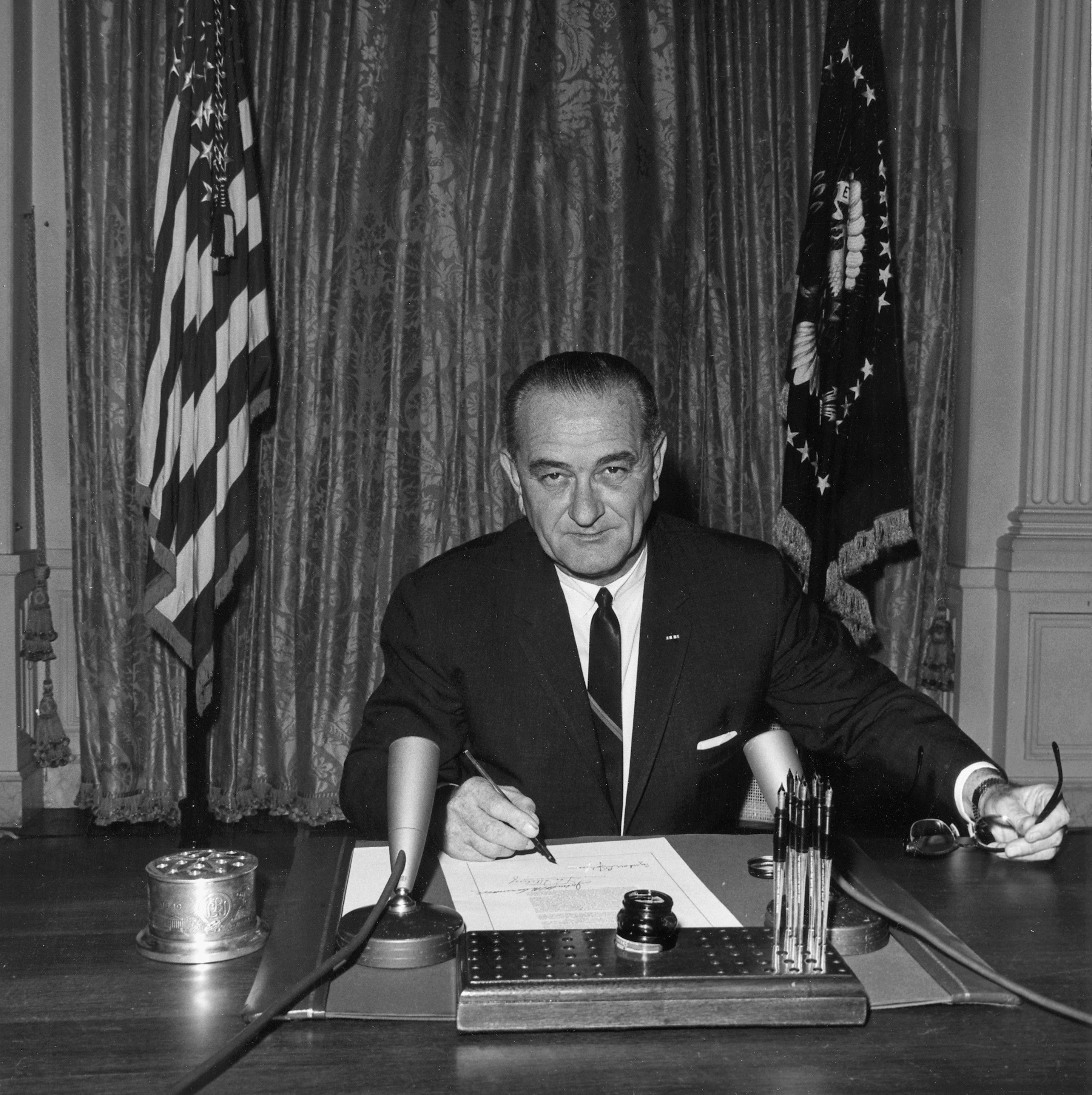
President Johnson as he signs the resolution on 10 August 1964

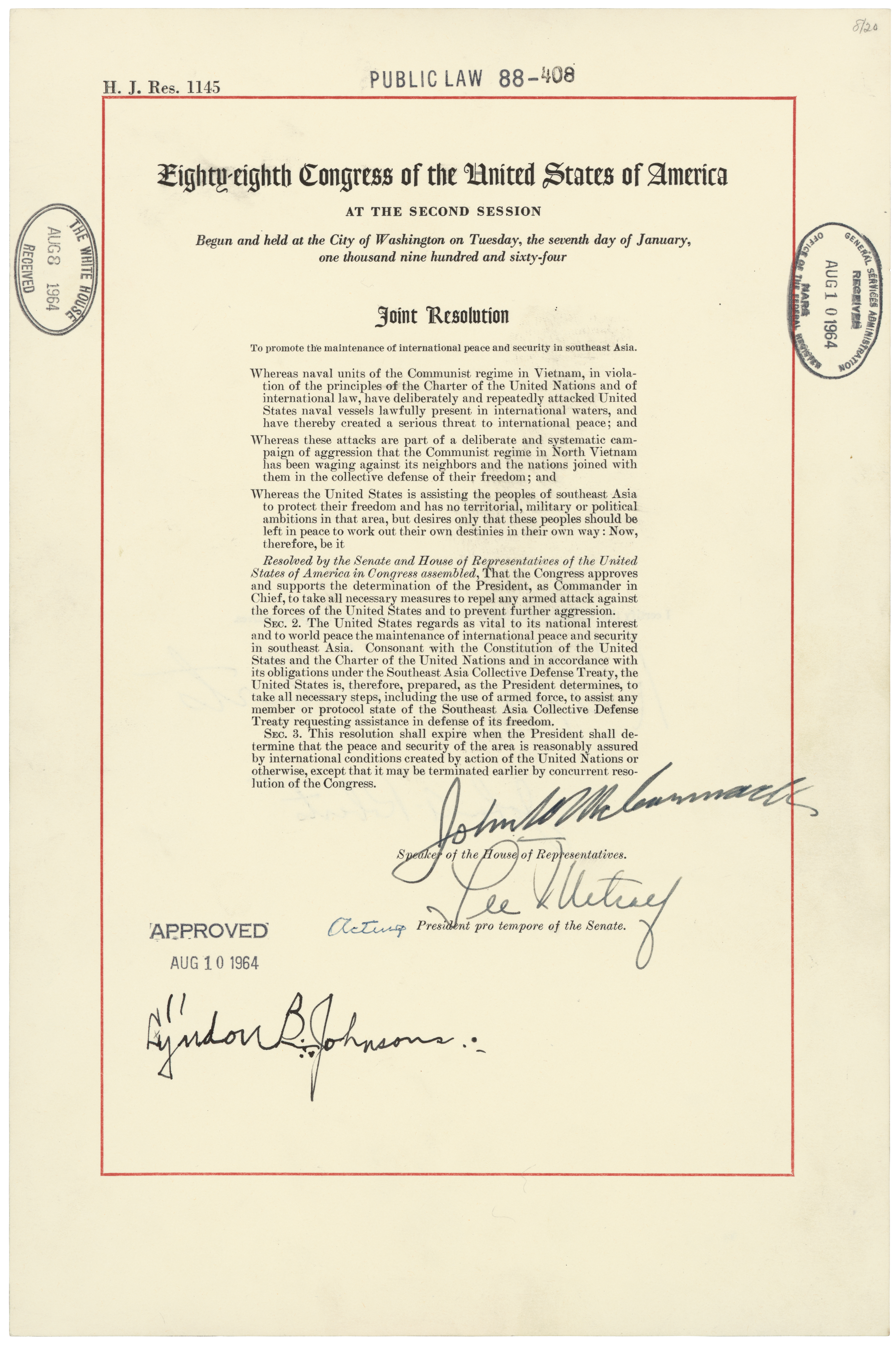

The USS Maddox, a U.S. destroyer, was conducting a DESOTO patrol in the waters of the Gulf of Tonkin on August 2, 1964, when it reported being attacked by three North Vietnamese Navy torpedo boats from the 135th Torpedo Squadron, which were attempting to close their range on Maddox for effective torpedo fire (1,000 yards was maximum effective range for the torpedoes) Maddox fired over 280 5-inch shells and the boats expended their 6 torpedoes (all misses) and some 14.5-mm machinegun fire. Breaking contact, the combatants commenced going their separate ways, when the three torpedo boats, T-333, T-336, and T-339 were then attacked by four USN F-8 Crusader jet fighter bombers from the aircraft carrier USS Ticonderoga. The Crusaders reported no hits with their Zuni rockets, but damaged all three torpedo boats with 20-mm cannons.

Johnson was informed of the incident and -- in the first use of the "hotline" to Moscow installed after the Cuban Missile Crisis -- called Khrushchev in the Kremlin to say that the United States did not want war, but he hoped that the Soviets would use their influence to persuade North Vietnam to not attack American warships. Though Johnson now had an "incident" at sea involving a North Vietnamese attack against American warships, he declined to use it as a reason to present a resolution to Congress. Johnson's fear was that the North Vietnamese could claim that the attempted raid on the radar station on Hon Me on July 30 gave them legitimate fears that the Maddox might have been moving in for a new attack. Johnson wanted an "incident" where it was unambiguous that the North Vietnamese were the aggressors by attacking American warships in waters that the American regarded as international.

Out of the hope of provoking such an incident, Johnson ordered the Maddox to continue to cruise off the coast of North Vietnam, to be joined by another destroyer, USS Turner Joy, with orders "to attack any force that attacks them". Both destroyers were ordered to sail 8 miles from North Vietnam in waters that Americans asserted were international waters, disregarding North Vietnam's claim to the 12-mile limit. The Secretary of State, Dean Rusk, ordered his staff to "pull together" the resolution Bundy had written in May–June, just in case Johnson decided to submit it to Congress. On 3 August 1964, the South Vietnamese in their Swift boats raided Cape Vinhson and Cua Ron. The cruise of the American destroyers was not directly connected to the raid, but Herrick knew from reading the summaries of decrypted North Vietnamese radio messages that the North Vietnamese believed that it was. Herrick received orders to "show the gauntlet" and prove to the North Vietnamese that the Americans would sail off North Vietnam in waters that the Americans insisted were international waters.

Two days later on a very stormy night on 4 August 1964, Maddox and the destroyer Turner Joy both reported to be under attack again, by North Vietnamese torpedo boats; during this alleged engagement, Turner Joy fired approximately 220 3-inch & 5-inch shells at surface targets showing on the radar. In response to the reported attack, aircraft from the Ticonderoga were launched, but the pilots reported no visual contact with any craft other than the two destroyers. Hanoi subsequently insisted that it had not launched a second attack. Though Herrick had reported an attack by North Vietnamese torpedo boats, he soon developed strong doubts about whatever an attack had actually occurred. Herrick reported to Admiral Sharp that the "torpedo boats" were almost certainly radar blips due to the "freak weather effects" caused by the storm and that an "overeager" sonar operator aboard the Maddox had mistaken the effects of the storm for torpedoes. Herrick's report concluded with the statement the "entire action leaves many doubts" as he noted that no sailor aboard his ship had seen a torpedo boat nor had heard any gunfire beyond the guns of the Turner Joy. Likewise no sailor aboard the Turner Joy claimed to have seen any North Vietnamese craft and none of the pilots of the Crusader aircraft stated they had seen any torpedo boats.

A later investigation by the Senate Foreign Relations Committee revealed that Maddox had been on an electronic intelligence (DESOTO) mission. It also learned that the U.S. Naval Communication Center in the Philippine Islands, in reviewing the ships' messages, had questioned whether any second attack had actually occurred. In 2005, an internal National Security Agency historical study was declassified; it concluded that Maddox had engaged the North Vietnamese Navy on August 2 but that there may not have been any North Vietnamese Naval vessels present during the engagement of August 4. The report stated:

It is not simply that there is a different story as to what happened; it is that no attack happened that night. ... In truth, Hanoi's navy was engaged in nothing that night but the salvage of two of the boats damaged on August 2.

In 1965, President Johnson commented privately: "For all I know, our Navy was shooting at whales out there."

== Congress votes ==
Early on the morning of August 4, 1964, Johnson told several congressmen at a meeting that North Vietnam had just attacked an American patrol in the Gulf of Tonkin in international waters and promised retaliation. At the same time, Johnson also stated that he wanted Congress to vote for a resolution of support. After the meeting, Johnson told one of his aides, Kenny O'Donnell, that he felt he was "being tested" by North Vietnam with both agreeing that how the president handled the crisis would affect the election. O'Donnell recalled that Johnson's main fear was the incident might allow his Republican opponent in the election, Senator Barry Goldwater, a chance to gain in the polls. O'Donnell added that Johnson felt that he "must not allow them [the Republicans] to accuse him of vacillating or being an indecisive leader".

The equivocal nature of Captain Herrick's reports were a worrisome factor, and Johnson informed McNamara, the member of the cabinet that he trusted the most, to ensure that the naval report remove all of the ambiguous elements. In turn, McNamara phoned Admiral Sharp to say the president was keen to launch a retaliatory raid, but could not move "unless we are dammed sure what happened". Admiral Sharp in turn applied strong pressure on Herrick to "confirm absolutely" that his patrol had been just attacked by North Vietnamese torpedo boats. Admiral Sharp in a telephone call at 2:08 pm to the Air Force general David A. Burchinal stated he had no doubt that the second attack had occurred, and expressed his annoyance at Herrick for his doubts. Just forty minutes later, Herrick sent a message on the radio saying "Certain that the original ambush was bona fide".

At the same time that Sharp was pressuring Herrick, Johnson had summoned McNamara to the White House to point out to him the best places to bomb in North Vietnam. The British ambassador, Lord Harlech, and the West German ambassador, Karl Heinrich Knappstein, were summoned to the State Department to be told that the United States would be launching a major bombing raid on North Vietnam very soon. A press release from the Defense Department accused North Vietnam of a "second deliberate attack" on American warships in international waters. At a meeting of the National Security Council, Rusk pressed for a bombing raid, saying the second alleged attack was more serious of the two incidents and that it indicated that North Vietnam wanted war with the United States. The CIA director John A. McCone in response stated that his agency believed that North Vietnam did not want war with America, saying that North Vietnam was acting "out of pride" and anger over the violation of its sovereignty with American warships sailing through its waters and South Vietnamese commandos attacking its shore. However, McCone accused North Vietnam of "upping the ante" and stated he supported the idea of bombing raids. Carl Rowan of the U.S. Information Agency and the lone black man at the meeting said his agency would have to justify any bombing raid and to rebut charges that the United States had fabricated the incidents, leading McNamara to say that there was no doubt that both incidents had occurred. McNamara wanted another DeSoto patrol off North Vietnam, but Undersecretary of State George Ball made an impassioned speech, saying: "Mr. President, I urge you not to make that decision. Suppose one of the destroyers is sunk with several hundred men aboard. Inevitably, there'll be a Congressional investigation. What would your defense be?...Just think what Congress and the world press would do with that! They would say that Johnson had thrown away lives just to have an excuse to bomb the North. Mr. President you couldn't live with that." In response, Johnson told McNamara: "We won't go ahead with it, Bob. Let's put it on the shelf".

The National Security Agency (NSA) had broken North Vietnam's codes, and McNamara emphasized to Johnson that certain decrypts conveyed that North Vietnamese torpedo boats had been damaged by American destroyers, thus proving that the second incident happened. However, several intelligence analyses at the time accused McNamara of having either misinterpreted, either intentionally or by mistake, decrypts referring to the first incident of August 2 and presenting them as referring to the second alleged incident of August 4. Ray S. Cline, the deputy director of the CIA later stated: "I felt from the start that the second incident had been questionable, but I simply wasn't sure. However, after a number of days collating and examining the reports relating to the second incident, I concluded that they were either unsound or that they dealt with the first incident". Cline was told to keep his doubts to himself.

Johnson invited 18 senators and congressmen led by Mansfield to the White House to inform them he had ordered a bombing raid on North Vietnam and asked for their support for a resolution. Johnson began the meeting with a warning: "It is dangerous to have the leaders come here. The reporters see they are coming and they go back and report all over the Hill. Some of our boys are floating in the water. The facts we would like to present to you are to be held in the closest confidence and are to be kept in this room until announced". Congressman Charles A. Halleck denied leaking the meeting, saying "I did not tell a damn person". The atmosphere of the meeting with Johnson saying that the American warplanes were on their way to bomb North Vietnam made it difficult for those present to oppose the president, out of the fear of appearing unpatriotic. Most of the congressional leaders were supportive, though Mansfield still had doubts, saying he preferred the matter be referred to the United Nations. Rusk assured Mansfield that he would have liked to take the matter up at the UN, but the possibility of a Soviet veto at the UN left the president no choice. Johnson told Mansfield the UN was not an option and that: "I have told you what I want from you". Senator George Aiken told the president about the proposed resolution: "By the time you send it up, there won't be anything for us to do, but support you". Senator Bourke B. Hickenlooper argued that there was no point in inquiring if the second incident had occurred or not, saying it was imperative that the United States must strike North Vietnam at once to show strength. Rusk told the congressional leaders: "We are trying to get across two points-one, leave your neighbor alone and, two, if you don't we will have to get busy". About the fact that Radio Hanoi had admitted to the first incident, but denied the second, Rusk used the radio broadcasts to argue for the malevolence and dishonesty of North Vietnam, saying: "They have not talked about what did happen, but what did not happen". After the meeting, Johnson summoned his National Security Adviser, McGeorge "Mac" Bundy, to tell him: "You know that resolution your brother's been talking about for the past few months? Well, now's the time to get it through Congress." When Bundy replied "Mr. President, that seems too fast for me", Johnson growled "I didn't ask you that question. I want you to do it."

Within hours, President Johnson ordered the launching of retaliatory air strikes (Operation Pierce Arrow) on the bases of the North Vietnamese torpedo boats and announced, in a television address to the American public that same evening, that U.S. naval forces had been attacked. Johnson in his television address announced: "Repeated acts of violence against the armed forces of the United States must be met not only with alert defense, but with positive reply. That reply is being given as I speak tonight". Johnson requested approval of a resolution "expressing the unity and determination of the United States in supporting freedom and in protecting peace in southeast Asia", stating that the resolution should express support "for all necessary action to protect our Armed Forces", but repeated previous assurances that "the United States ... seeks no wider war". As the nation entered the final three months of political campaigning for the 1964 elections (in which Johnson was standing for election), the president contended that the resolution would help "hostile nations ... understand" that the United States was unified in its determination "to continue to protect its national interests". The media reaction to the raid was highly favorable with The New York Times declaring in an editorial that those doubted if Johnson could handle pressure "were saying that they now had a commander-in-chief who was better under pressure than they had ever seen him". A rare dissenting voice was the veteran left-wing journalist I.F. Stone who argued that the raid was illegal stating the League of Nations Covenant, the Kellog-Briand Pact and the United Nations Charter had banned reprisals in peacetime. Stone wrote in an editorial: "Hackworth's Digest, the State Department's huge Talmud of international law, quotes an old War Department manual, Rules of Land Warfare, as authoritative on the subject. This says reprisals are never to be taken 'merely for revenge', but only as an unavoidable last resort 'to enforce the rules of civilized warfare'. And they should not exceed the degree of violence committed by the enemy". Stone argued that no damage had been done to either destroyer, but contrast the American bombing raid had destroyed a naval base and an oil storage facility in North Vietnam.

On 5 August 1964, Johnson submitted the resolution to Congress, which if passed would give him the legal power to "take all necessary measures" and "prevent further aggression" as well as allowing him to decide when "peace and security" in Southeast Asia were attained. Johnson commented the resolution was "like grandma's nightshirt-it covered everything". Despite his public claims of "aggression", Johnson in private believed that the second incident had not taken place, saying at a meeting in the Oval Office in his Texas twang: "Hell, those dumb stupid sailors were just shooting at flying fish". The president's two chosen instruments for passing the resolution were the Defense Secretary Robert McNamara and Senator J. William Fulbright, the chairman of the Senate Foreign Relations Committee. McNamara had the image of the "whiz kid", a man of almost superhuman intelligence and ability whose computer-generated graphs and spreadsheets showed the best way to "scientifically" solve any problem. McNamara, whose statements always seemed to be backed up by the Pentagon's computers had the ability to "dazzle" Congress and whatever he requested of Congress tended to be approved. Fulbright, through too much an individualist and an intellectual to fit into the Senate's "Club", was widely respected as the Senate's resident foreign policy expert and as a defender of Congress's prerogatives. If Fulbright backed the resolution, Johnson knew that he would probably carry over the doubters and waverers, of which there were several. Johnson knew that the conservative Republicans together with the conservative Southern Democrats would vote for the resolution, but he did not want to be dependent upon their support for his foreign policy as his domestic policies were anathema to them. From Johnson's viewpoint, having liberal Democrats and liberal Republicans vote for the resolution would free his hands to carry out the domestic reforms he wanted to have Congress pass after the election.

On 5 August 1964, Fulbright arrived at the White House to meet Johnson, where the president asked his old friend to use all his influence to get the resolution passed. Johnson insisted quite vehemently to Fulbright that the alleged attack on the destroyers had taken place and it was only later that Fulbright became skeptical about whether the alleged attack had really taken place. Furthermore, Johnson insisted the resolution, which was a "functional equivalent to a declaration of war" was not intended to be used for going to war in Vietnam. In the 1964 election, the Republicans had nominated Goldwater as their candidate, who ran on a platform accusing Johnson of being "soft on Communism" and by contrast promised a "total victory" over Communism. Johnson argued to Fulbright that the resolution was an election year stunt that would prove to the voters that he was really "tough on Communism" and thus dent the appeal of Goldwater by denying him of his main avenue of attack. Besides for the primat der innenpolitik reason Johnson gave for the resolution, he also gave a primat der aussenpolitik reason, arguing that such a resolution would intimidate North Vietnam into ceasing to try to overthrow the government of South Vietnam, and as such Congress passing a resolution would make American involvement in Vietnam less likely rather than more likely. Fulbright's longstanding friendship with Johnson made it difficult for him to go against the president, who cunningly exploited Fulbright's vulnerability, namely his desire to have greater influence over foreign policy. Johnson gave Fulbright the impression that he would be one of his unofficial advisers on foreign policy and that he was very interested in turning his ideas into policies, provided that he voted for the resolution, which was a test of their friendship. Johnson also hinted that he was thinking about sacking Rusk if he won the 1964 election and would consider nominating Fulbright to be the next Secretary of State. Fulbright had much contempt for whoever happened to be Secretary of State, always believing that he understood foreign policy better than any of them, and had a particular contempt for Rusk, so the offer to be Secretary of State was tempting for him. Fulbright also felt a strong rapport with his fellow Southerner Johnson, the first Southern president since Wilson. Finally, for Fulbright in 1964 it was inconceivable that Johnson would lie to him and he believed the resolution "was not going to be used for anything other than the Tonkin Gulf incident itself" as Johnson had told him. Johnson told Fulbright he wanted the resolution passed by the widest possible margin to show North Vietnam that Congress was united behind the administration. Despite all of Johnson's efforts, there was little danger of the resolution not being passed. A public opinion poll at the time showed that 85% of Americans felt that Congress should pass the resolution.

On 6 August 1964, U.S. Secretary of Defense Robert S. McNamara testified before a joint session of the Senate Foreign Relations and Armed Services committees. He stated that Maddox had been "carrying out a routine mission of the type we carry out all over the world at all times" and denied that it had been in any way involved in South Vietnamese patrol boat raids on the offshore islands of Hon Me and Hon Nieu on the nights of July 30 and July 31. In his testimony, McNamara accused North Vietnam of "aggression" and of an "unprovoked attack" on the destroyers. Senator Wayne Morse had been tipped off by a source inside the Pentagon about Operation 34A, and asked McNamara about there was any connection between the activities of the Maddox and Operation 34A, leading to a blunt denial. In response to Morse's question, McNamara answered dismissively: "Our navy played absolutely no part in, was not associated with, was not aware of any South Vietnamese actions, if there were any...I say this flatly. This is a fact". The administration did not, however, disclose that the island raids, although separate from the mission of Maddox, had been part of a program of clandestine attacks on North Vietnamese installations called Operation Plan 34A. These operations were carried out by U.S.-trained South Vietnamese commandos under the control of a special operations unit of the U.S. Military Assistance Command, Vietnam called the Studies and Operations Group.

Despite McNamara's statement, Morse appeared before an almost empty Senate later on 6 August 1964 to say: "The place to settle the controversy is not on the battlefield but around the conference table". Morse was supported only by Senator Ernest Gruening who stated in a speech "all Vietnam is not worth the life of a single American boy". Senator Richard Russell Jr., who previously had doubts about Vietnam and whose long-standing friendship with Johnson had just been severely tested by the latter's support for the Civil Rights Act, supported the resolution, saying: "Our national honor is at stake. We cannot and will not shrink from defending it". On 6 August 1964, Fulbright gave a speech on the Senate floor calling for the resolution to be passed as he accused North Vietnam of "aggression" and praised Johnson for his "great restraint...in response to the provocation of a small power". He also declared his support for the Johnson administration's "noble" Vietnam policy, which he called a policy of seeking "...to establish viable, independent states in Indochina and elsewhere which will be free and secure from the combination of Communist China and Communist North Vietnam". Fulbright concluded that this policy could be accomplished via diplomatic means and echoing Johnson's thesis, argued that it was necessary to pass the resolution as a way to intimidate North Vietnam who would presumably change their policies towards South Vietnam once Congress passed the resolution. Fulbright called the resolution a mechanism "calculated to prevent the spread of war".

At a crucial meeting of several senators, Fulbright was able to persuade them to support the resolution. Several Senators such as Allen J. Ellender, Jacob Javits, John Sherman Cooper, Daniel Brewster, George McGovern and Gaylord Nelson were very reluctant to vote for a resolution that would be a "blank cheque" for a war in southeast Asia, and at the meeting Fulbright called to discuss the issue, he argued that passing a resolution would make fighting a war less likely, claiming the whole purpose of the resolution was only intimidation. Nelson wanted to add an amendment forbidding Johnson from sending troops to fight in Vietnam unless Congress gave its approval first, saying he did not like the open-ended nature of the resolution. Fulbright dissuaded him, saying he had the president's word that "the last thing we want to do is become involved in a land war in Asia". Fulbright argued to Nelson the resolution was "harmless" while saying that the real purpose of the resolution was "to pull the rug out from under Goldwater", going on to ask Nelson who did he prefer to win the election, Johnson or Goldwater? From the viewpoint of Nelson, a liberal Democrat known for his support of environmentalism, Johnson was a far more preferable president than Goldwater, the leader of the right wing of the Republican Party.

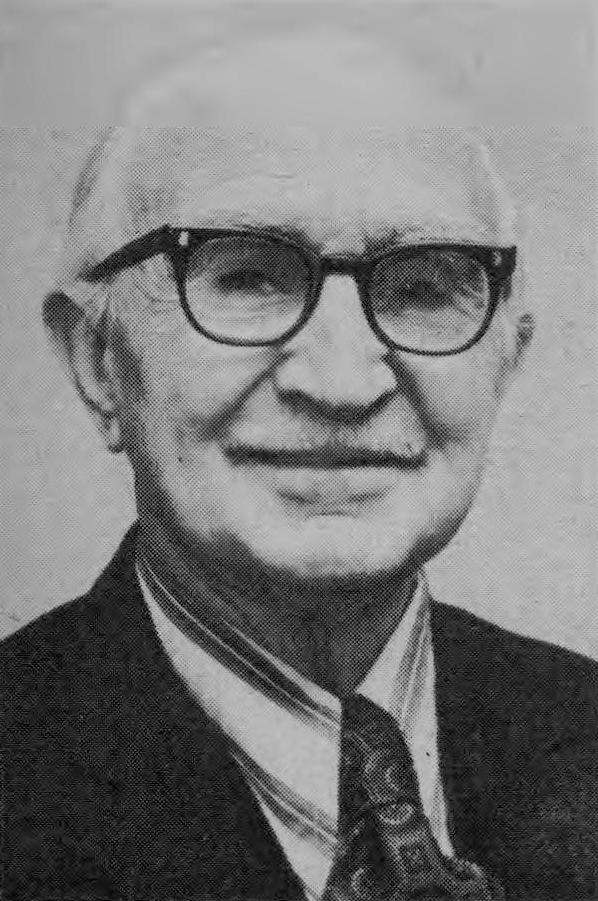
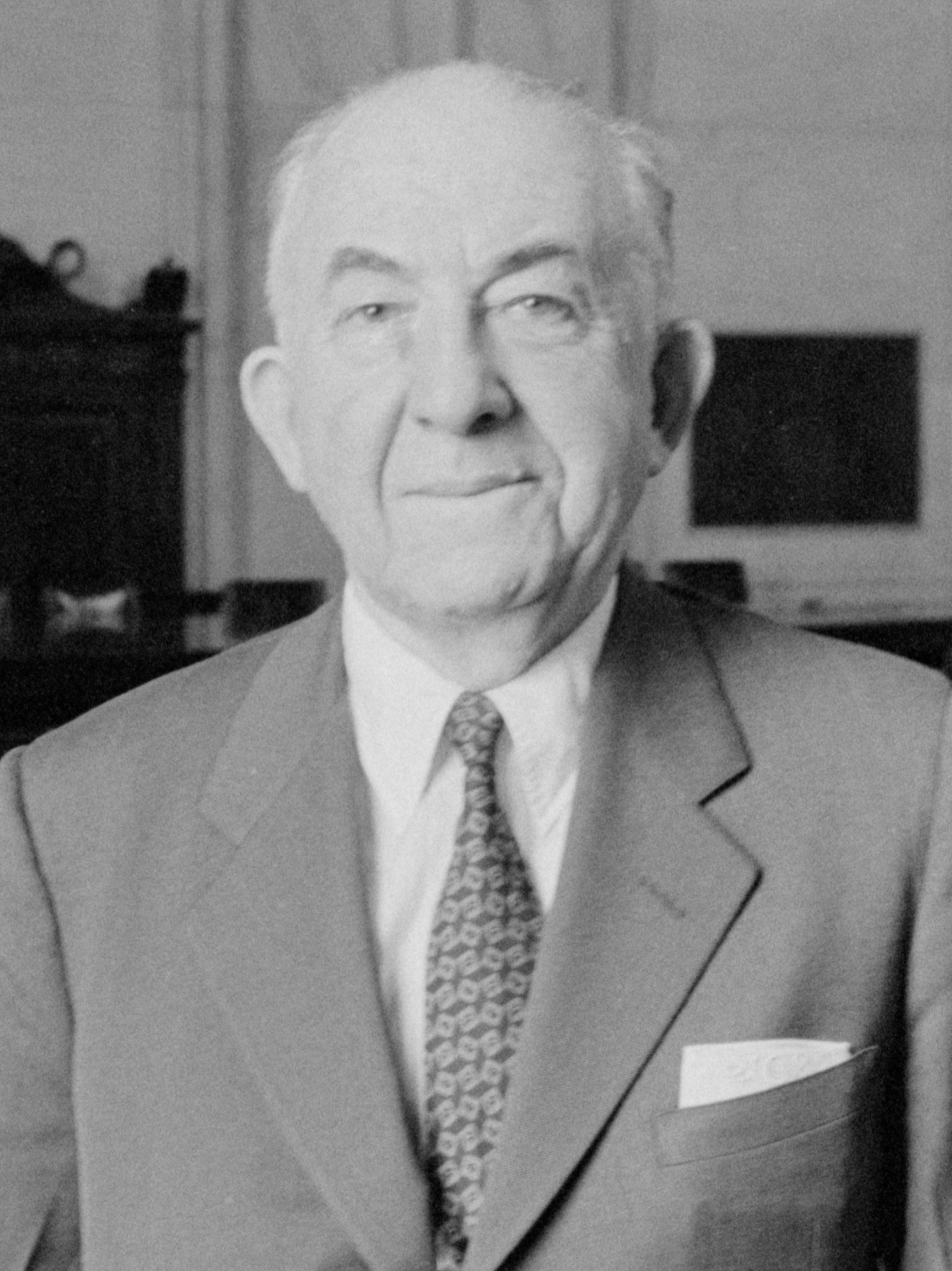
Wayne Morse (D-OR) (left) and Ernest Gruening (D-AK) (right) were the only nay votes.

After less than nine hours of committee consideration and floor debate, Congress voted, on 10 August 1964, on a joint resolution authorizing the president "to take all necessary steps, including the use of armed force, to assist any member or protocol state of the Southeast Asia Collective Defense Treaty requesting assistance in defense of its freedom" (H.J. RES 1145 1964). The unanimous affirmative vote in the House of Representatives was 416–0. (However, Republican Congressman Eugene Siler of Kentucky, who was not present but opposed the measure, was "paired" with another member who favored the resolution—i.e., his opposition was not counted, but the vote in favor was one less than it would have been.) The Senate conferred its approval by a vote of 88–2. Some members expressed misgivings about the measure, but in the end, Democratic Senators Wayne Morse of Oregon and Ernest Gruening of Alaska cast the only nay votes. At the time, Senator Morse warned that "I believe this resolution to be a historic mistake." Morse also predicted that those who voted for the resolution "will live to regret it". Much to Johnson's satisfaction, Senator Goldwater voted for the resolution as appropriate, which allowed the president to present himself as just as "tough on Communism" as his opponent.

After the resolution was passed, the Speaker of the House of Representatives, John W. McCormack called Johnson to congratulate him. The call was recorded and Johnson spent much time denouncing Morse as mentally unstable and untrustworthy while he called Gruening an ingrate, saying "He's just no good. I've spent millions on him up in Alaska". Rostow was ebullient and stated: "The second attack probably hadn't happened, but it was the chance to do what we should have been doing all along".

== As a policy instrument ==
The passage of the resolution alarmed several American allies (e.g.: Canada) who preferred that the United States not fight in Vietnam. J. Blair Seaborn, the Canadian diplomat who served as Canada's representative to the International Control Commission engaged in secret "shuttle diplomacy" carrying messages back and forth from Hanoi to Washington in an attempt to stop the escalation of the war. On 13 August 1964, Seaborn arrived in Hanoi to meet the North Vietnamese Premier, Phạm Văn Đồng. Seaborn told Đồng that based on his recent meetings with Johnson that he was seriously using the powers he just gained from the Gulf of Tonkin resolution to go to war, but also stated that Johnson was willing to offer "economic and other benefits" if only North Vietnam ceased trying to overthrow the government of South Vietnam. Seaborn further stated that Johnson had told him that North Vietnam would "suffer the consequences" if it continued on its "present course". Đồng rejected the offer, saying he would rather see the war engulf "the whole of Southeast Asia" than to abandon the vision of one Communist Vietnam.

Though Johnson now had the power to wage war in Vietnam, he proved reluctant to use it, instead hoping that Ambassador Taylor could somehow pressure the South Vietnamese to fight better. On 11 August 1964, William Bundy wrote a memo on the "next course of action", under which predicated that unless South Vietnamese "morale and momentum" could be improved, the regime of General Khanh would collapse. Bundy recommended a programme of gradually increasing escalation to achieve "maximum results for minimal risks". Bundy argued for August, the United States should do nothing to "take onus off the Communist side for escalation". Starting in September, the memo advocated more DESOTO patrols, 34A raids, and for the United States to start bombing the part of the Ho Chi Minh Trail running through neutral Laos. In January 1965, Bundy stated the "next move upward" would begin with a strategic bombing campaign against North Vietnam. Taylor objected to Bundy's plan, stating if the U.S started bombing North Vietnam, it would trigger a North Vietnamese response that the South Vietnamese would not be able to handle on their own. Taylor, who had become increasingly disillusioned with South Vietnam as Khanh drove him to exasperation with his stupidity wrote: "We should not get involved militarily with North Vietnam and possibly with Red China if our base in South Vietnam is insecure and Khanh's army is tied down everywhere by the Vietcong insurgency". General Wheeler and the rest of Joint Chiefs of Staff rejected Taylor's advice and advocated an immediate strategic bombing campaign against North Vietnam. On 7 September 1964, Johnson called a meeting at the White House attended by McNamara, Rusk, Wheeler, the Bundy brothers and Taylor to discuss what to do. Taylor conceded that there "only the emergence of an exceptional leader could improve the situation and there is no George Washington in sight". The meeting concluded that the U.S. would react "as appropriate" against "any" attacks against American forces. A war game conducted by the Joint Chiefs of Staff in September 1963 code-named Sigma I found that the U.S. would have to commit half-million troops to have a chance of victory in Vietnam; its sequel code-named Sigma II in September 1964 reached the same conclusion and found that despite the claims of General LeMay that a strategical bombing campaign would not be decisive, instead stating that the war would only be won on the ground.

On 1 November 1964, Viet Cong guerrillas attacked the American air field at the Bien Hoa Air Base, killing 5 American servicemen and destroying 6 B-57 bombers. Wheeler recommended an immediate bombing campaign against North Vietnam, but Johnson demurred, instead creating a "working group" to consider scenarios for American intervention. The conclusion of the "working group" chaired by William Bundy when presented in late November resorted to the bureaucratic device of the "Goldilocks's Principle" by presenting Johnson with two extreme options of either invading North Vietnam or abandoning South Vietnam; in between the two extremes was the third option of gradual escalation, which Bundy knew that Johnson would choose. On 1 December 1964, McNamara, Rusk and "Mac" Bundy presented Johnson again with the "Goldilock's Principle" by giving him three options, knowing he would choose the third as invading North Vietnam and abandoning South Vietnam were too extreme for him. Johnson agreed to their advice to launch Operation Barrel Roll to bomb the Lao section of the Ho Chi Minh trail and for more 34A raids. On Christmas Eve 1964, the Viet Cong bombed the Brinks Hotel in Saigon, killing two Americans. Despite almost unanimous advice to bomb North Vietnam, Johnson refused, saying in a cable to Taylor "The final responsibility is mine and the stakes are very high indeed". Johnson added: "I have never felt that this war will be won from the air, and it seems to me that what is much needed and would be more effective is a larger and stronger use of Rangers and Special Forces and Marines, or other appropriate military strength on the ground and on scene..I know that it might involve the acceptance of larger Americans sacrifices but I myself am ready to substantially increase the Americans in Vietnam if it is necessary to provide this kind of fighting force against the Vietcong".

As Johnson continued to procrastinate, he repeatedly received advice from McNamara, the Bundy brothers, Rusk, and Wheeler that now was the time to use his powers under the resolution. A memo co-written by "Mac" Bundy and McNamara in January 1965 stated "our present policy can lead only to a disastrous defeat" with the alternative being either "salvage what little can be saved" by withdrawing or to commit American forces to war. By contrast, Taylor advised Johnson against committing American troops, stating that having the Americans "carry the ball" would only encourage South Vietnam's feuding generals to engage in even more in-fighting at the expense of the war effort, thus creating a vicious circle where the Americans would do all the fighting while the ARVN did nothing, leading to a situation where more and more Americans would be needed. After a Viet Cong attack on the American air base at Pleiku in February 1965, Johnson called a meeting at the White House attended by his national security team plus Mansfield and McCormack to announce that "I've had enough of this" and that he had decided on a bombing campaign. Only Mansfield and the Vice President Hubert Humphrey opposed the plans to bomb North Vietnam.

Johnson ordered Operation Flaming Dart on 7 February 1965, a bombing raid on a North Vietnamese Army base, which marked the beginning of a series of increasing intense bombing raids. The British Prime Minister Harold Wilson, who was strongly opposed to the United States fighting a war in Asia which would distract American attention from Europe, wrote to Johnson proposing a summit in Washington, where he intended to press Johnson to not use his powers under the resolution to fight war in Vietnam. Johnson phoned Wilson to say the proposed summit was superfluous, maintaining he could not see "what was to be gained by flapping around the Atlantic with our coattails out", and instead urged Wilson to send British troops to fight in Vietnam. On 22 February 1965, the commander of the U.S. forces in Vietnam, General William Westmoreland, stated that he had no confidence in the ability of the ARVN to protect the American air base at Danang and asked for two Marine battalions to protect it, a request that Johnson approved. On 2 March 1965, Johnson ordered Operation Rolling Thunder, the strategic bombing offensive against North Vietnam that had long been urged upon him. On 8 March 1965, two battalions of Marines landed at Danang to fulfill Westmoreland's request for troops to protect the air base.

Fulbright who developed doubts by this point advised Johnson that a "massive ground and air war in Southeast Asia" would be a "disaster", but Johnson now had the legal power to wage war as he saw fit and disregarded his warning not send any more troops. The Joint Chiefs of Staff led by Wheeler now recommended further troops to Vietnam and on 1 April 1965 Johnson agreed to send 2 more Marine battalions plus 28,000 logistic troops. At the same time, Johnson approved Westmoreland's request for "offensive defense" by allowing the Marines to patrol the countryside instead of just guarding the air base, committing the U.S. to a ground war. Taylor wrote that Johnson having "crossed the Rubicon" with Rolling Thunder "was now off to Rome on the double". On 20 April 1965, Johnson approved a plan to send 40,000 U.S Army troops to South Vietnam by June. In June, Westmoreland reported "The South Vietnamese armed forces cannot stand up to this pressure without substantial U.S. combat troops on the ground" and stated that he needed 180,000 men immediately, a request that was granted in July. In a telephone call to McNamara that unknown to the latter was being recorded, Johnson said "We know ourselves that when we asked for this Tonkin Gulf resolution, we had no intention of committing this many ground troops", leading McNamara to say "right". Johnson concluded: "And we're doin' so now and we know it's goin' be bad, and the question: do we just want to do it out on a limb by ourselves?" On 28 July 1965, Johnson gave a TV speech saying: "I have asked the commanding general, General Westmoreland, what more he needs to meet this mounting aggression. He has told me. And we will meet his needs. We cannot be defeated by force of arms. We will stand in Vietnam".

In February 1966, Morse introduced a motion to repeal the resolution, which he argued was unconstitutional and had been used in ways that Johnson had promised that it would not be. Through Morse's motion had no chance of passing with Senate Majority Leader Mansfield fatalistically saying "we are in too deep now", he was able to extend the debate for two weeks. Morse who was described as a "skilled parliamentarian" was able to use various procedural methods to keep the debate going despite Mansfield's efforts, and several senators spoke in favor of the motion. Russell complained about the "very great grant of power" that the resolution had granted Johnson. Ultimately, most senators followed Johnson's argument that America was at war and it was the patriotic duty of Congress to support the president, no matter what, and only five senators voted for Morse's motion.

== Repeal ==
By 1967, the rationale for what had become a costly U.S. involvement In the Vietnam War was receiving close scrutiny. With opposition to the war mounting, a movement to repeal the resolution—which war critics decried as having given the Johnson administration a "blank check"—began to gather steam.

An investigation by the Senate Foreign Relations Committee revealed that Maddox had been on an electronic intelligence collection mission off the North Vietnamese coast. It also learned that the U.S. Naval Communication Center in the Philippine Islands, in reviewing ships' messages, had questioned whether any second attack had actually occurred.

The administration of President Richard Nixon, which took office in January 1969, initially opposed repeal, warning of "consequences for Southeast Asia [that] go beyond the war in Vietnam". In 1970 the administration began to shift its stance. It asserted that its conduct of operations in Southeast Asia was based not on the resolution but was a constitutional exercise of the president's authority, as commander in chief of U.S. military forces, to take necessary steps to protect American troops as they were gradually withdrawn (the U.S. had begun withdrawing its forces from Vietnam in 1969 under a policy known as "Vietnamization").

Mounting public opinion against the war eventually led to the repeal of the resolution, which was attached to the Foreign Military Sales Act that Nixon signed in January 1971. Seeking to restore limits on presidential authority to engage U.S. forces without a formal declaration of war, Congress passed the War Powers Resolution in 1973, over Nixon's veto. The War Powers Resolution, which is still in effect, sets forth certain requirements for the president to consult with Congress in regard to decisions that engage U.S. forces in hostilities or imminent hostilities.

== Reconsideration ==
"[O]nce-classified documents and tapes released in the past several years, combined with previously uncovered facts, make clear that high government officials distorted facts and deceived the American public about events that led to full U.S. involvement in the Vietnam War", according to Paterson (2008).

== See also ==
- Authorization for Use of Military Force Against Iraq Resolution of 2002
