= Frew (surname) =

Frew is a surname. Notable people with the surname include:

- Alan Frew, lead singer for the Canadian band, Glass Tiger
- Alex Frew, Scottish born rugby player
- Andrew Frew, Australian rugby player
- Anita Frew, Scottish businesswoman
- Donald H. Frew, American Wiccan elder
- Harding Frew, Australian civil engineer
- Irv Frew, Canadian ice hockey player
- James Frew (disambiguation), several people
- Joseph Frew (1873–unknown), Scottish footballer
- Matthew Frew, First World War flying ace, senior RAF officer
- Paul Frew, politician from Northern Ireland
- Peggy Frew, Australian author
- Steve Frew, Scottish gymnast
- Wendy Frew, New Zealand netball player
