= William Lewis (Kentucky politician) =

American politician (1868–1959)

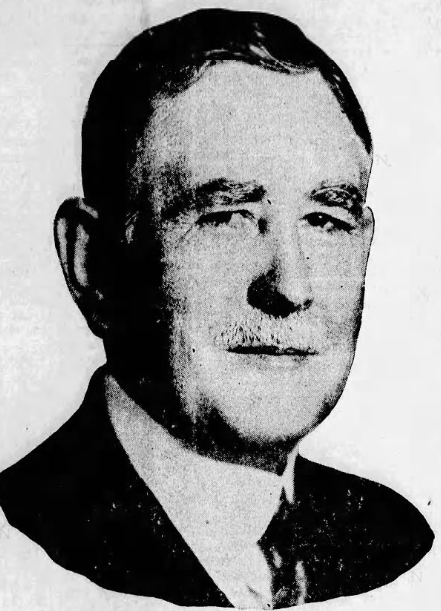
- Lewis in 1948

Member of the U.S. House of Representatives from Kentucky's 9th district
- In office April 24, 1948 – January 3, 1949
- Preceded by: John M. Robsion
- Succeeded by: James S. Golden

Member of the Kentucky House of Representatives from the 93rd district
- In office January 1, 1900 – January 1, 1902
- Preceded by: James M. Hall
- Succeeded by: David S. Colson

Personal details
- Born: September 22, 1868 Cutshin, Kentucky, U.S.
- Died: August 8, 1959 (aged 90) London, Kentucky, U.S.
- Resting place: A.R. Dyche Memorial Park
- Party: Republican
- Profession: Politician, lawyer

William Lewis (September 22, 1868 – August 8, 1959) was a U.S. Representative from Kentucky.

Born in Cutshin, Kentucky, Lewis was raised on a farm and attended the common schools of Leslie and Perry Counties and the Laurel County Seminary, London, Kentucky. He studied law at the University of Kentucky and at the University of Michigan. He was Sheriff of Leslie County in 1891 and 1892, and Superintendent of schools of Leslie County 1894–1898. He served as member of the Kentucky House of Representatives in 1900 and 1901, was Commonwealth's attorney 1904–1909, and Circuit judge of the twenty-seventh judicial district of Kentucky 1909–1922 and 1928–1934. He entered the private practice of law.

Lewis was elected as a Republican to the Eightieth Congress to fill the vacancy caused by the death of John Marshall Robsion and served from April 24, 1948, to January 3, 1949. Robsion had been in the House since 1919 (with a two-term interruption) and there was no obvious successor in the seventeen-county district. Lewis was something of a GOP grand-old man; he had made two unsuccessful campaigns for the House before, in 1930 and 1932 during Robsion's hiatus. Nevertheless, it took the district committee eight ballots to nominate him. He was a place-holder, with the understanding he would not run for re-election. Lewis is the oldest person to win his first election to Congress, and was 79 years old at the time he assumed office. He was not a candidate for renomination in 1948 to the Eighty-first Congress. He died in London, Kentucky, August 8, 1959. He was interred in A.R. Dyche Memorial Park.

U.S. House of Representatives
Preceded by John M. Robsion	Member of the U.S. House of Representatives from Kentucky's 9th congressional district 1948–1949	Succeeded by James S. Golden
