= Sizerock, Kentucky =

Unincorporated community in Kentucky, United States

- Unincorporated community
- Location within Kentucky Location within the United States
- Coordinates: 37°13′07″N 83°29′51″W
- Country: United States
- State: Kentucky
- County: Leslie
- Elevation: 1,066 ft (325 m)
- Time zone: UTC-5 (Eastern (EST))
  - Summer (DST): UTC-4 (EDT)
- ZIP code: 41762
- Area code: 606
- GNIS feature ID: 515448

Sizerock is an unincorporated community in Leslie County, Kentucky, United States. Sizerock is 8 miles (13 km) northwest of Hyden. Sizerock had a post office with ZIP code 41762 that closed in 1964.
