= Eugene Siler =

American politician (1900–1987)

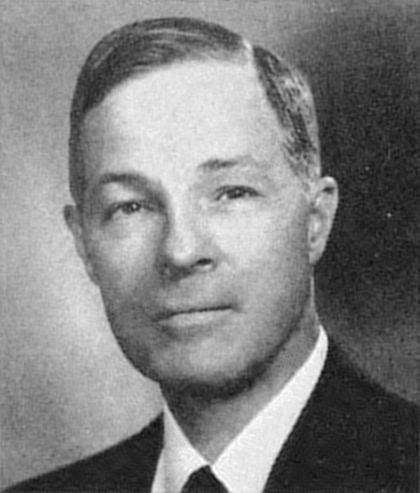

Member of the U.S. House of Representatives from Kentucky
- In office January 3, 1955 – January 3, 1965
- Preceded by: James S. Golden
- Succeeded by: Tim Lee Carter
- Constituency: 8th district (1955–1963); 5th district (1963–1965)

Justice of the Kentucky Court of Appeals
- In office November 30, 1945 – January 3, 1949
- Preceded by: E. Poe Harris
- Succeeded by: Roy Helm

Personal details
- Born: Eugene Edward Siler; June 26, 1900 Williamsburg, Kentucky, U.S.
- Died: December 5, 1987 (aged 87) Louisville, Kentucky, U.S.
- Party: Republican
- Spouse: Lowell Jones (m. 1925)
- Children: 4, including Eugene Jr.
- Education: Cumberland College; University of Kentucky; Columbia University
- Occupation: Politician; lawyer

Military service
- Allegiance: United States
- Branch: United States Navy; United States Army
- Rank: Captain
- Wars: World War I World War II

Eugene Edward Siler Sr. (June 26, 1900 – December 5, 1987) was an American politician and member of the United States House of Representatives from Kentucky between 1955 and 1965. He was the only member of the House of Representatives to oppose (by pairing against) the Gulf of Tonkin Resolution. That resolution authorized deeper involvement of the United States in the Vietnam War.

== early life and career ==
Siler, a self-described "Kentucky hillbilly", was born in Williamsburg, Kentucky, the son of attorney Adam Troy and Minnie (née Chandler) Siler. He was a staunch Republican and hailed from a traditionally Republican region of Kentucky. Siler served in the United States Navy during World War I and in the United States Army as a captain during World War II. His wartime experiences left him, according to David T. Beito, "cold to most proposals to send American troops into harm's way."

Siler graduated from Cumberland College in Williamsburg in 1920 and from the University of Kentucky at Lexington in 1922. He attended law school at Columbia University and returned to Williamsburg to practice as a small-town lawyer. Siler was a devout Baptist and became a renowned preacher. He abstained from alcohol, tobacco, and profanity; and, as a lawyer, rejected clients seeking divorces or who were accused of alcohol-related crimes.

== Political career ==
In 1945, Siler was elected a judge of the Court of Appeals of Kentucky. He refused his 150-dollar expense allotment, instead donating it to a special fund Siler set up for scholarships. As a judge, Siler frequently quoted scriptures from the bench. He did the same in his speeches during his 1951 run for governor. This, according to Beito, earned him "a statewide reputation as a 'Bible Crusader.'" First elected to the court in a special election, he was defeated for a full eight-year term in 1948 by Democratic candidate Roy Helm.

Siler was the Republican nominee for Governor of Kentucky in 1951. He was defeated by Democratic incumbent Lawrence Wetherby; Wetherby won with 55% of the vote.

During his tenure in the House of Representatives, which began in 1955, Siler consistently stressed social conservatism. He sponsored a bill to ban liquor and beer advertising in all interstate media. He stated that permitting these ads was akin to allowing the "harsh hussy" to advertise in "the open door of her place of business for the allurement of our school children". Additionally, he was "100 percent for Bible reading and the Lord's Prayer in our public schools".

Like his friend and fellow Republican, Representative Harold Royce Gross, Siler considered himself a fiscal watchdog. He opposed junkets, government debt, and high spending. Siler, however, made exceptions for his home district by supporting flood control and other federal measures that aided it.

Like Gross, Siler was a Taft Republican (or Old Right Republican) who was opposed to entangling military alliances and foreign interventions. Siler was a consistent opponent of foreign aid; he was one of only two congressmen to vote against John F. Kennedy's call up of reserves during the Berlin crisis. He supported Barry Goldwater in 1964 but did not share his interventionist foreign policy views.

Siler did not sign the 1956 Southern Manifesto, and voted in favor of the Civil Rights Acts of 1957 and 1960, as well as the 24th Amendment to the U.S. Constitution, but did not vote on the Civil Rights Act of 1964.

Siler was critical of U.S. involvement in Vietnam. In 1964, after deciding not to seek reelection, he quipped in jest that he would run for President as an antiwar candidate—he pledged to resign after one day in office, after ordering the troops brought home. He considered the Gulf of Tonkin Resolution, which authorized President Lyndon B. Johnson to take "all necessary steps" in Vietnam, as a "buck-passing" pretext to "seal the lips of Congress against future criticism." Siler was the sole member of the House of Representatives to vote against the Resolution.

In 1968, the worsening situation in Vietnam prompted Siler to return to politics, unsuccessfully seeking the Republican U.S. Senate nomination. Siler ran on a platform calling for withdrawal of all U.S. troops by Christmas. Ernest Gruening (D.-Alaska) and Wayne Morse (D.-Oregon), the only two U.S. Senators who voted against the Gulf of Tonkin Resolution, were also defeated that year.

== Personal life ==
Siler married Lowell Jones in 1925 at Williamsburg, and they had four children, one of whom, Eugene Edward Siler Jr., became a federal judge. He died at his daughter's Louisville home on December 5, 1987.

== Legacy ==
- In 1985, Cumberland College, in Siler's hometown of Williamsburg, built a men's residence hall named Eugene Siler Hall.

== See also ==
Party political offices
Preceded by Eldon S. Dummit	Republican nominee for Governor of Kentucky; 1951	Succeeded by Edwin R. Denney
U.S. House of Representatives
Preceded by James S. Golden	U.S. Representative, Kentucky's 8th district January 3, 1955 – January 3, 1963	Succeeded by seat lost to redistricting
Preceded by Brent Spence	U.S. Representative, Kentucky's 5th district January 3, 1963 – January 3, 1965	Succeeded by Tim Lee Carter
