= Operation 34A =

American covert actions against North Vietnam

Operation 34A (full name, Operational Plan 34A, also known as OPLAN 34-Alpha) was a highly classified United States program of covert actions against the Democratic Republic of Vietnam (DRV or North Vietnam), consisting of agent team insertions, aerial reconnaissance missions and naval sabotage operations.

== Background ==
After the Geneva Conference in 1954, Air Force Colonel Edward Lansdale was sent by the then CIA director Allen Dulles as Deputy Director of the Office of Special Operations (under the CIA), to initiate a series of clandestine operations against North Vietnam. These operations, codenamed 'Nautilus', consisted of raids conducted by commandos (South Vietnam recruits), and the insertion of CIA-recruited spies.

In July 1963, the Department of Defense (DOD) and the CIA determined that operational control should be transferred to the DOD. On 1 January 1964, Military Assistance Command, Vietnam – Studies and Observations Group (MACV-SOG) took command of the operation (MACV-SOG was a cover name for a multi-service unconventional warfare task force under the direct guidance and control of the Pentagon).

== Operation ==
Once the MACV-SOG took control, the Pentagon (under which MACV-SOG operated) issued an Operational Plan (OPLAN 34-63), which entailed commando raids of a similar sort to what had been happening under the CIA. Most of these raids tended to be unsuccessful, with the Republic of Vietnam (RVN or South Vietnam) commandos usually being captured or killed (the actual commandos themselves were always people of South Vietnamese ethnicities, so as to maintain the deniability of the American involvement in the operation). A U.S. Navy base was set up in Da Nang, to serve as a base for the operations, and was staffed with U.S. Navy SEALs, U.S. Marine intelligence officers, and other guerrilla warfare specialists. The Navy also donated several Nasty-class PTF boats, and training crews for them, for operational purposes. At the same time, the operational plan was expanded, with much more and more ambitious missions, into what became known as Operational Plan (OPLAN) 34A, which essentially shifted the focus to offshore assaults on coastal installations of the Democratic Republic of Vietnam (DRV or North Vietnam), while agent insertion operations still continued. These however, were discontinued after they realized that most of the agents they were running had been captured and/or turned, and psychological operations were stepped up. These consisted mostly of spreading anti-communist propaganda, and deception operations, for example, the creation of a "Sacred Sword of Patriotic League", which was a fictitious resistance movement against the communists, designed to spread discontent and provoke paranoia among the civilians and military of North Vietnam.

Starting in mid-1962, the U.S. Navy began conducting electronic surveillance operations conducted by a division of ocean-going minesweepers (MSO) operating along the coast of North and South Vietnam. The minesweepers were equipped with portable vans containing highly sophisticated electronic surveillance equipment. The minesweepers fueled on occasion at a South Vietnamese fueling station located near the fishing port (Da Nang) and took on evidence from CIA operatives which allegedly tended to prove that China and Russia were supplying the Viet Cong with weapons and other material. Occasionally, usually between midnight and 3 a.m., DRVN gunboats would approach the minesweepers at high speed and then peel off and return to a DRVN naval base operating on an island north of the 30th parallel. The gunboats made threatening maneuvers but never actually attacked the minesweepers. The maneuvers were reported to CINCPAC and the Pentagon in nightly Top Secret cryptograph messages. The minesweepers were essentially defenseless should an attack occur. In early 1963, the minesweepers were relieved by a division of destroyers (the DESOTO patrols) which appear to have carried out the same electronic surveillance operations conducted by the minesweepers.

Although the two sets of operations were at least nominally independent of one another, the patrols often gathered intelligence that was crucial to OPLAN 34A. The attacks carried out by the patrol boats provoked responses by the North Vietnamese military that were monitored by the American destroyers, thus providing very useful intelligence on DRV military capabilities. The situation swiftly escalated as the DRV deployed heavy gunboats and torpedo equipped frigates to observe the U.S. maneuvers.

=== Gulf of Tonkin Incident ===
On the morning of 2 August 1964, the morning after OPLAN commandos raided a North Vietnamese radio transmitter located on an offshore island, one of these destroyers, the USS Maddox, was reported to have come under attack by DRV naval patrol boats in the Gulf of Tonkin. There was a second alleged attack on 4 August, which was later shown to be a falsehood. These attacks, and the ensuing naval actions, known as the Gulf of Tonkin Incident, were seized upon by President Lyndon Johnson to secure passage by the U.S. Congress of the Southeast Asia Resolution (better known as the Gulf of Tonkin Resolution) on 7 August 1964, leading to a dramatic escalation of the Vietnam War. It has since been alleged that the Gulf of Tonkin Incident was partly a fabrication, including testimony by participants, such as squadron commander James Stockdale, in the events themselves. Even the attacks that did happen were not unprovoked, but a result of the OPLAN 34A raids, which was in essence an American operation.
