= Essie, Kentucky =

Unincorporated community in Kentucky, United States

- Unincorporated community
- Location in Kentucky Location in the United States
- Coordinates: 37°3′42″N 83°27′7″W
- Country: United States
- State: Kentucky
- County: Leslie
- Elevation: 1,434 ft (437 m)
- Time zone: UTC-5 (Eastern (EST))
  - Summer (DST): UTC-4 (EST)
- ZIP codes: 40827
- GNIS feature ID: 512086

Essie is an unincorporated community in Leslie County, Kentucky, United States.

A post office was established in 1924 by James Bowling, and named for his daughter, Essie.
