= Wooton Presbyterian Center =

- U.S. National Register of Historic Places
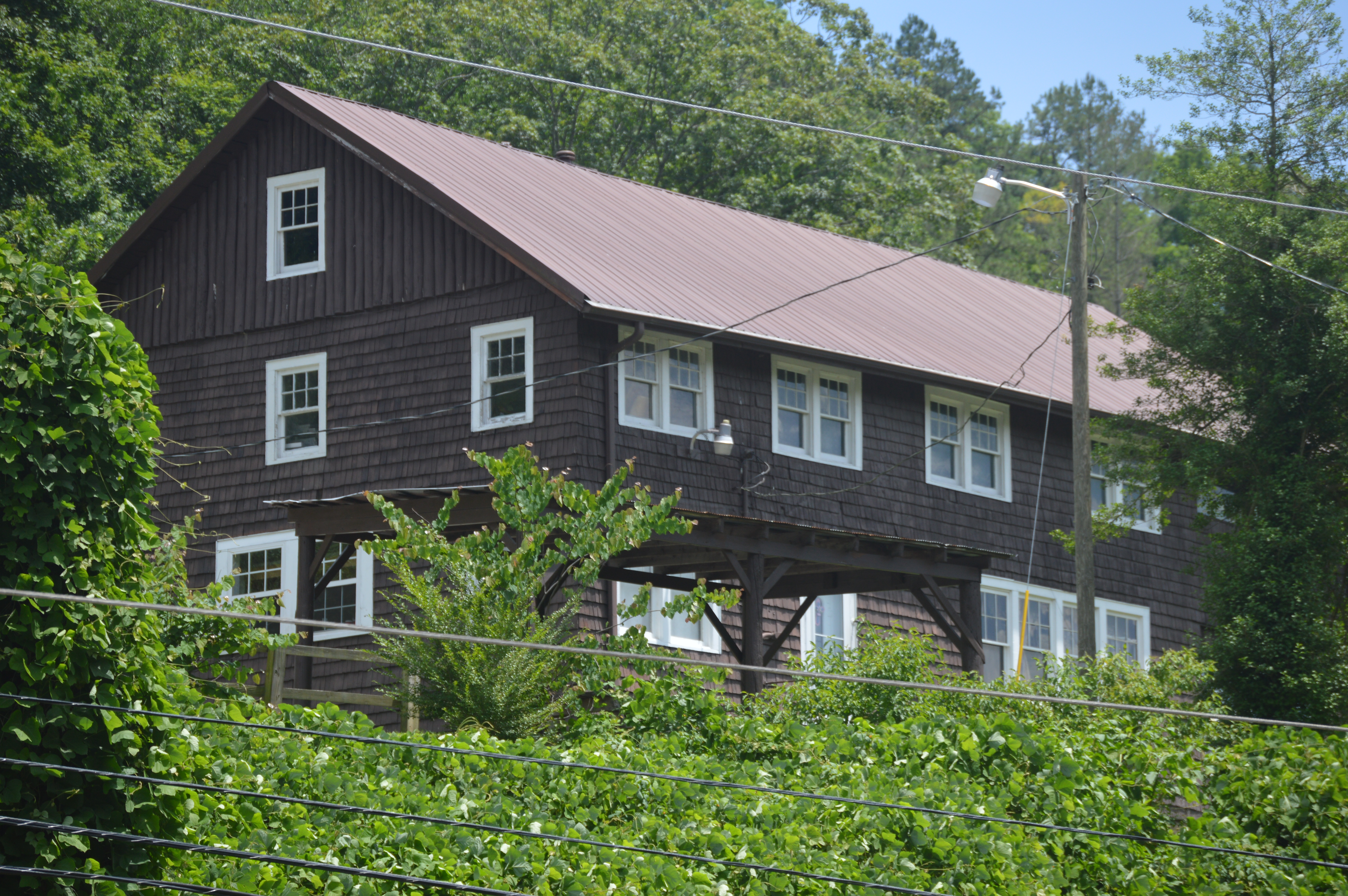
- Front and northern side

- Location within Kentucky Location within the United States
- Location: Kentucky Route 80 at Wooton, Kentucky
- Coordinates: 37°10′51″N 83°18′7″W
- Area: 0.8 acres (0.32 ha)
- Built: 1919
- Architectural style: Shingle Style
- NRHP reference No.: 79001019
- Added to NRHP: May 24, 1979

The Wooton Presbyterian Center, also known as Wooton Community Center, is a historic building on KY 80 in Wooton, Kentucky. It was built during 1919-21 and added to the National Register of Historic Places in 1979.

The center provided medical services to the community from 1917 until 1950. Its building, completed in 1921, is a two-and-a-half-story Shingle Style building with a recessed porch on its first floor and an enclosed sunporch on its second floor.
