= Joe B. Bates =

American politician (1893–1965)

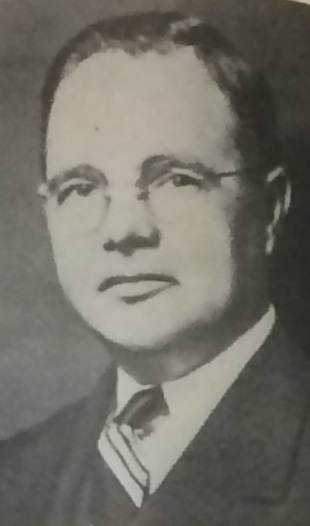

Member of the U.S. House of Representatives from Kentucky's 8th district
- In office June 4, 1938 – January 3, 1953
- Preceded by: Fred M. Vinson
- Succeeded by: James S. Golden

Personal details
- Born: Joseph Bengal Bates; October 29, 1893 Kentucky, U.S.
- Died: September 10, 1965 (aged 71) Ashland, Kentucky, U.S.
- Resting place: Bellefonte Memorial Gardens, Flatwoods, Kentucky
- Party: Democratic
- Education: Mountain Training School

Joseph Bengal Bates (October 29, 1893 – September 10, 1965) was a U.S. representative from Kentucky.

Born in Kentucky, Bates attended the public schools and the Mountain Training School at Hindman, Kentucky. He graduated from Eastern Kentucky State Teachers College at Richmond in 1916. He studied law. He taught in the rural schools of Knott County, Kentucky, from 1912 to 1915, was high school superintendent at Raceland, Kentucky from 1917 to 1919, and worked as county clerk of Greenup County, Kentucky from 1922 to 1938.

Bates was elected as a Democrat to the Seventy-fifth Congress to fill the vacancy caused by the resignation of Fred M. Vinson. He was reelected to the Seventy-sixth and to the six succeeding Congresses and served from June 4, 1938, to January 3, 1953. He was an unsuccessful candidate for renomination in 1952 after his home was redistricted into the neighboring 5th District, losing to 5th District Congressman Brent Spence, and later unsuccessfully sought the Democratic nomination in 1956 for the United States Senate with the strong support of then Governor Happy Chandler.

He practiced law and was a resident of Greenup, Kentucky. He died in Ashland, Kentucky on September 10, 1965. He was interred in Bellefonte Memorial Gardens, Flatwoods, Kentucky.

Preceded by Fred M. Vinson	Member of the U.S. House of Representatives from Kentucky's 8th congressional district June 4, 1938 - January 3, 1953	Succeeded by James S. Golden
