= Helton, Kentucky =

Unincorporated community in Kentucky, United States

- Unincorporated community
- Location in Kentucky Location in the United States
- Coordinates: 36°57′14″N 83°23′27″W
- Country: United States
- State: Kentucky
- County: Leslie
- Elevation: 1,240 ft (380 m)
- Time zone: UTC-5 (Eastern (EST))
  - Summer (DST): UTC-4 (EST)
- ZIP codes: 40840
- GNIS feature ID: 512641

Helton is an unincorporated community in Leslie County, Kentucky, United States.

A post office was established in the community in 1885, and named for its first postmaster. The post office is no longer active.
