= Mozelle, Kentucky =

Unincorporated community in Kentucky, United States

- Unincorporated community
- Location in Kentucky Location in the United States
- Coordinates: 37°00′9″N 83°23′53″W
- Country: United States
- State: Kentucky
- County: Leslie
- Elevation: 1,083 ft (330 m)
- Time zone: UTC-5 (Eastern (EST))
  - Summer (DST): UTC-4 (EDT)
- ZIP codes: 40858
- GNIS feature ID: 514127

Mozelle is an unincorporated community located in Leslie County, Kentucky, United States. Its post office is closed.
