= James S. Golden =

American lawyer and politician (1891–1971)

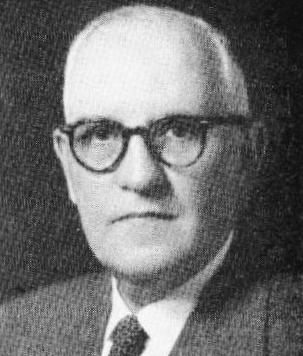
- Golden in 1953

Member of the U.S. House of Representatives from Kentucky
- In office January 3, 1949 – January 3, 1955
- Preceded by: William Lewis (9th); Joe B. Bates (8th)
- Succeeded by: District eliminated (9th); Eugene Siler (8th)
- Constituency: 9th district (1949-53); 8th district (1953-55)

Personal details
- Born: James Stephen Golden; September 20, 1891 Barbourville, Kentucky, US
- Died: September 6, 1971 (aged 79) Pineville, Kentucky, US
- Party: Republican
- Education: Union College; University of Kentucky (AB); University of Michigan (LLB)
- Profession: Lawyer, politician

James Stephen Golden (September 20, 1891 – September 6, 1971) was an American lawyer and politician. A member of the Republican Party, he was a member of the United States House of Representatives from Kentucky.

== Biography ==
Golden was born on September 20, 1891, in Barbourville, Kentucky, to Benjamin Bristow Golden and Elizabeth (née Davis) Golden. He attended public schools in Barbourville. He studied at Union Commonwealth University, the University of Kentucky, and the University of Michigan; he graduated from Kentuc in 1912 and from Michigan in 1916. Also in 1916, he was admitted to the bar, after which he practiced in Barbourville. He was a lawyer in murder trials and civil disputes, favoring the latter in his later career. He also represented the United Mine Workers of America.

A Republican, Golden served as attorney of Knox County, Kentucky from 1918 to 1922. During his campaign for county attorney, he was accused by a journalist of marrying into a "Democrat family". He moved to Pineville, Kentucky.

Golden was a member of the United States House of Representatives from January 3, 1949, to January 3, 1955. From January 3, 1949, to January 3, 1953, he represented the 9th district, and from January 3, 1953, to January 3, 1955, represented the 8th district. He was part of the House Committee on Agriculture and the Committee on Post Office and Post Roads. He championed economic reforms, such as bettering social security and providing flood protection to south Kentucky citizens. In the midst of his tenure, he was a delegate to the 1952 Republican National Convention.

After serving in Congress, Golden continued practicing law. In 1915, he married to Ruth Decker. He had two children. He died on September 6, 1971, aged 79, in Pineville. He is buried at Pineville Memorial Cemetery.

U.S. House of Representatives
Preceded by William Lewis	Member of the U.S. House of Representatives from Kentucky's 9th congressional district January 3, 1949 – January 3, 1953	Succeeded by District eliminated
Preceded by Joe B. Bates	Member of the U.S. House of Representatives from Kentucky's 8th congressional district January 3, 1953 – January 3, 1955	Succeeded by Eugene Siler
