= USS De Haven (DD-727) =

Allen M. Sumner-class destroyer

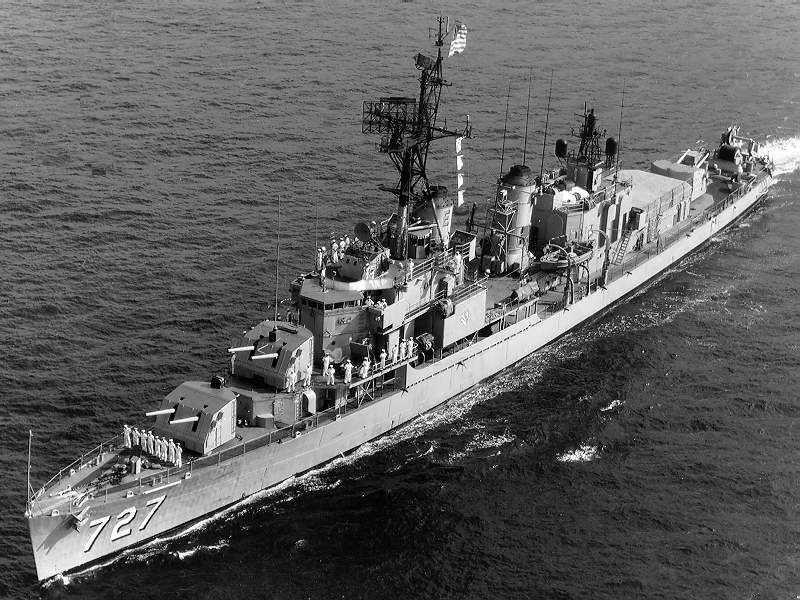
- USS De Haven underway on 19 November 1970

History

United States
- Name: De Haven
- Namesake: Edwin De Haven
- Builder: Bath Iron Works
- Laid down: 9 August 1943
- Launched: 9 January 1944
- Sponsored by: Mrs. H. N. De Haven
- Commissioned: 31 March 1944
- Decommissioned: 3 December 1973
- Stricken: 3 December 1973
- Identification: Callsign: NHVF; Hull number: DD-727
- Honours and awards: See Awards
- Fate: Transferred to South Korea, 5 December 1973
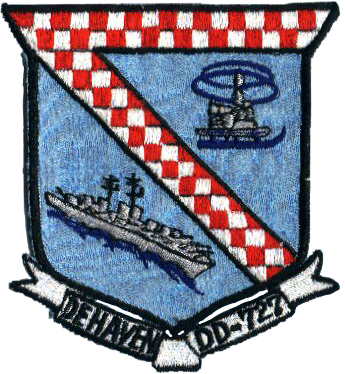
- Badge

South Korea
- Name: Incheon; (인천)
- Namesake: Incheon
- Acquired: 5 December 1973
- Reclassified: DD-918
- Stricken: 1993
- Identification: Hull number: DD-98
- Fate: Scrapped, 1993

General characteristics
- Class & type: Allen M. Sumner-class destroyer; Daegu-class destroyer
- Displacement: 2,200 long tons (2,235 t)
- Length: 376 ft 6 in (114.76 m)
- Beam: 40 ft (12 m)
- Draft: 15 ft 8 in (4.78 m)
- Propulsion: 60,000 shp (45,000 kW); 2 propellers
- Speed: 34 kn (63 km/h; 39 mph)
- Range: 6,500 nmi (12,000 km; 7,500 mi) at 15 kn (28 km/h; 17 mph)
- Complement: 336
- Armament: 6 × 5 in (130 mm)/38 cal guns, 12 × 40 mm AA guns, 11 × 20 mm AA guns, 10 × 21 inch (533 mm) torpedo tubes, 6 × depth charge projectors, 2 × depth charge tracks

USS De Haven (DD-727), an Allen M. Sumner-class destroyer, was the second ship of the United States Navy to be named for Lieutenant Edwin J. De Haven. De Haven served aboard the Vincennes, flagship of the Wilkes Expedition, officially known as the United States Exploring Expedition, from 1839 to 1842. De Haven also served in the Mexican–American War, assisting in the capture of the Mexican schooner Creole. He was placed on the retired list in February 1862. He died in Philadelphia on 1 May 1865.

De Haven was launched on 9 January 1944 by Bath Iron Works Corp., Bath, Maine, sponsored by Miss H. N. De Haven; and commissioned on 31 March 1944.

== Service history ==
=== United States Navy ===
De Haven escorted Ranger from Norfolk to Pearl Harbor, arriving on 3 August 1944. She screened a convoy to Eniwetok between 16 and 30 August, and returned to Eniwetok on 5 October. A week later, she got underway for Ulithi to join TF 38. Operating from this base, she screened the fast carriers striking Luzon in support of the invasion of Leyte during November and December. In coordination with the invasion of Lingayen Gulf, Luzon, the force hit Formosa, Luzon, Camranh Bay, Hong Kong, Hainan, and Okinawa in a score of strikes extending from 30 December 1944 to 26 January 1945.

On 10 February 1945, De Haven sortied from Ulithi with TF 58, to prepare for the invasion of Iwo Jima, striking the Japanese mainland as well as the Nansei Shoto, and then providing fire support for the invading troops. Returning to Ulithi on 4 March, she sailed 10 days later to screen air strikes on Kyushu, Japan, prior to the invasion of Okinawa. Until 13 June, she screened the carriers and gave fire support at Okinawa. On 1 July, she sailed from Leyte with TF 38 for the final air strikes and bombardments on the Japanese homeland which continued until the end of the war. Present in Tokyo Bay 2 September for the signing of the surrender, De Haven sailed on 20 September for the States, arriving at San Francisco on 15 October.

Between 1 February 1946 and 3 February 1947, De Haven served in the Western Pacific, joining the 7th Fleet in operations off the coast of China, and patrolling off the Japanese coast. She operated along the west coast through 1948 and 1949, and on 1 May 1950 cleared San Diego for another tour of duty in the western Pacific, arriving at Yokosuka the last day of May.

=== Korea ===
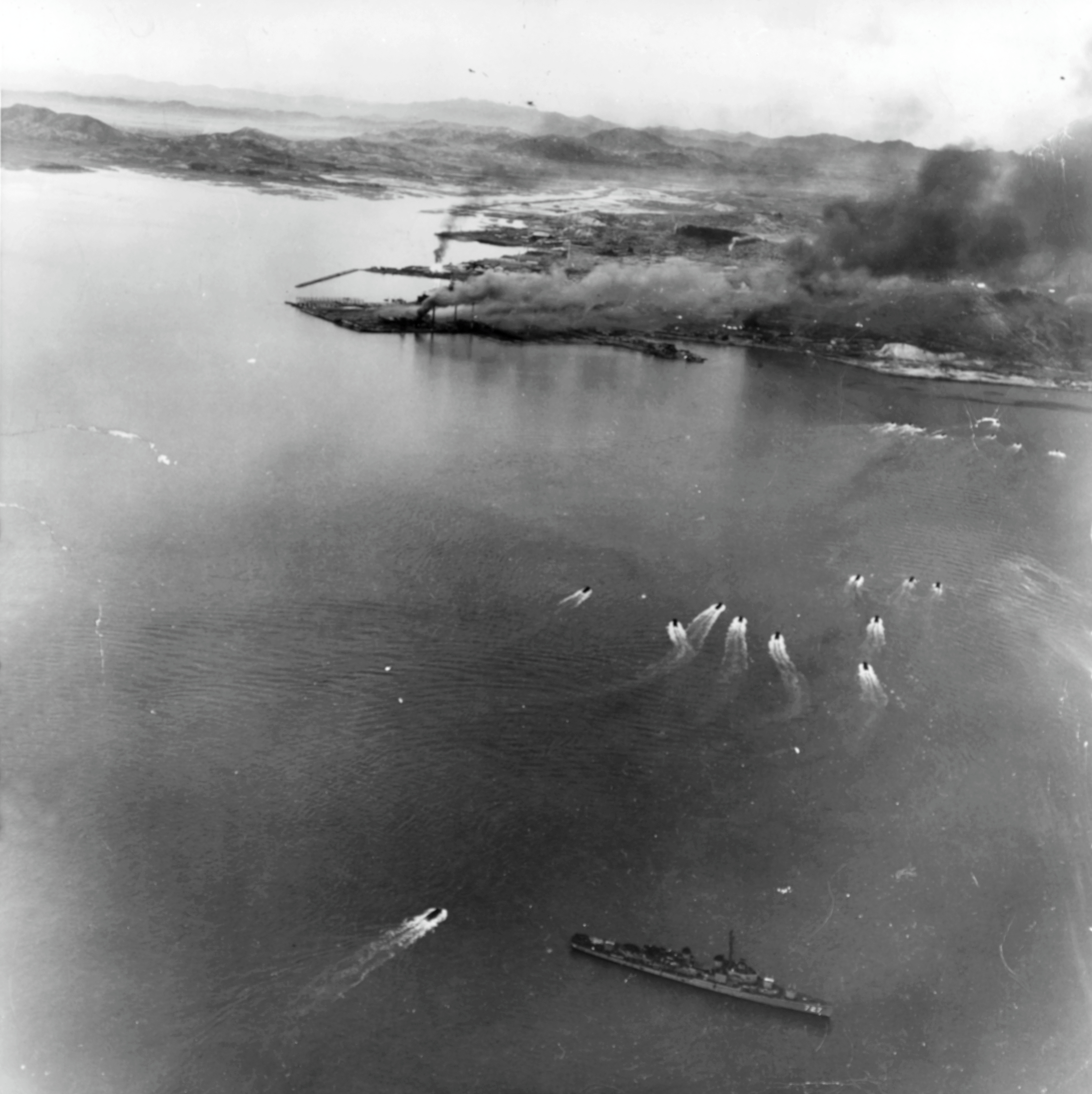
De Haven (bottom center) covers landing craft of the first and second waves as they approach Blue Beach during the Inchon landings on 15 September 1950.

North Korea invaded South Korea on 25 June 1950, De Haven was assigned to patrol off the Korean coast. She screened the Norwegian ship Reinholt evacuating American dependents from Inchon to Yokosuka; patrolled on the blockade; bombarded shore targets; acted as lifeguard and communications linking ship for air strikes against Pyongyang and Haeju; and provided call fire support for United Nations troops.

On 13 and 14 September, she stood up a treacherous channel to anchor a scant 800 yards from Wolmi-do island and poured fire into the concealed gun emplacements in preparation for the assault on Inchon. De Haven provided gunfire support for the successful landings the following day, and for her part in this daring action was awarded the Navy Unit Commendation.

Returning to blockade duty on 25 September 1950, De Haven dispersed a North Korean force attempting to ambush a Korean Army unit; aided Brush and escorted her to Sasebo; and provided fire support for a British Commando raid on 6 and 7 October. She cleared Yokosuka on 1 November for San Diego, arriving 18 November.

During De Haven's second tour of Korean duty from 18 June 1951 to 17 February 1952, she served primarily on blockade patrol. After an overhaul and local operations at San Diego, she sailed from Long Beach 16 September 1952 to serve as flagship for ships on patrol in the Chongjin-Songjin-Chaho area until 18 November. After patrol duty with TF 77, she returned to Korean waters for duty with TF 95 on patrol off Wonsan Harbor, supporting the minesweeping operations there from 12 to 18 February. She got underway from Sasebo 22 March for Long Beach, arriving on 9 April.

=== Refugee controversy ===
According to declassified documents obtained by the Associated Press, U.S. commanders repeatedly ordered refugees from South Korea shot. While the most famous example of this policy remains the No Gun Ri Massacre, another incident, on 1 September 1950, has been confirmed by the declassified official diary of De Haven. It states that the Navy destroyer, at Army insistence, fired on a seaside refugee encampment at Pohang, South Korea. Survivors say 100 to 200 people were killed.

De Haven continued to alternate duty in the western Pacific with local operations along the west coast, making six voyages to the Far East from 1953 through 1959. De Haven participated in Operation Hardtack I near Eniwetok Island during the summer of 1958, witnessing approximately 22 nuclear detonations, one from only three nautical miles. She was also one of the US Navy vessels that ran the Chinese naval blockade on Quemoy-Matsu. On 1 February 1960, she began a major overhaul for modernization at San Francisco, completed in September. De Haven returned to training activities through the remaining months of 1960.

=== DESOTO patrols ===
De Haven was the namesake of the DESOTO patrols (DEHAVEN Special Operations off QingdaO). It conducted the first patrol from 14 April 1962 to 20 April 1962 in the area focused around the Qingdao area of the Yellow Sea. The ship was instructed not to approach any Chinese-Communist-held territory, including offshore islands closer than 10 miles.

These patrols were a response to Chinese Communist's unexpected re-definition of their territorial waters to include all waters shoreward from lines drawn tangentially to, and between, twelve mile circles drawn around their offshore islands. Such a declaration represented a huge expansion of their claims. This inhibited the lawful navigation of international waters and increased the likelihood and frequency of formal diplomatic "serious warnings" issued by Beijing when any Seventh Fleet units navigated through these areas. This became a situation to which Commander Seventh Fleet felt compelled to respond.

There were three components to the purpose of these patrols. First, they would establish and maintain the presence of the U.S. Seventh Fleet in the international waters off the China coast and later the Vietnamese coast. Second, they would serve as a minor Cold War irritant to the Chinese Communists. Third, they would collect as much intelligence as possible during the patrols.

This first DESOTO patrol was highly effective in evoking Chinese Communist reaction. For example, De Haven was shadowed by three or more Chicom vessels (Anshan-class destroyers Anshan, Changchun & Taiyuan) at one time, jamming of De Haven's communications facilities occurred and the use of deceptive pennant numbers on the shadowing vessels all contributed to the success of the intelligence effort on this mission. Furthermore, the Chicoms issued three "serious warnings" to De Haven for violation of territorial rights during the 7 days the mission was in progress in international waters. The eight subsequent patrols did not collect nearly as much intelligence as the first.

These patrols were conducted in later years by other ships. These patrols and other factors eventually led to international incidents with other ships resulting in the Gulf of Tonkin incident and the Pueblo incident.

=== Republic of Korea Navy ===
De Haven was transferred to the Republic of Korea Navy on 5 December 1973, and renamed Incheon, after the Korean city of Incheon. It was first designated DD-98, and then DD-918. The ship was stricken and broken up for scrap in 1993.

== Awards ==
De Haven received five battle stars for her service in World War II. In Korea, she received another six stars and a Navy Unit Commendation. De Haven received Armed Forces Expeditionary Medals for service relating to Vietnam in 1962, 1963 and 1964 as well as Vietnam Service Medals during every year from 1965 to 1971. Combat Action Ribbons were awarded for service 25 August 1967, 6–7 September 1967 and 13 September 1967. A Navy Unit Commendation was awarded to De Haven and her crew for service 15 June 1966 to 20 August 1968.
