= Leslie County, Kentucky =

County in Kentucky, United States

- County
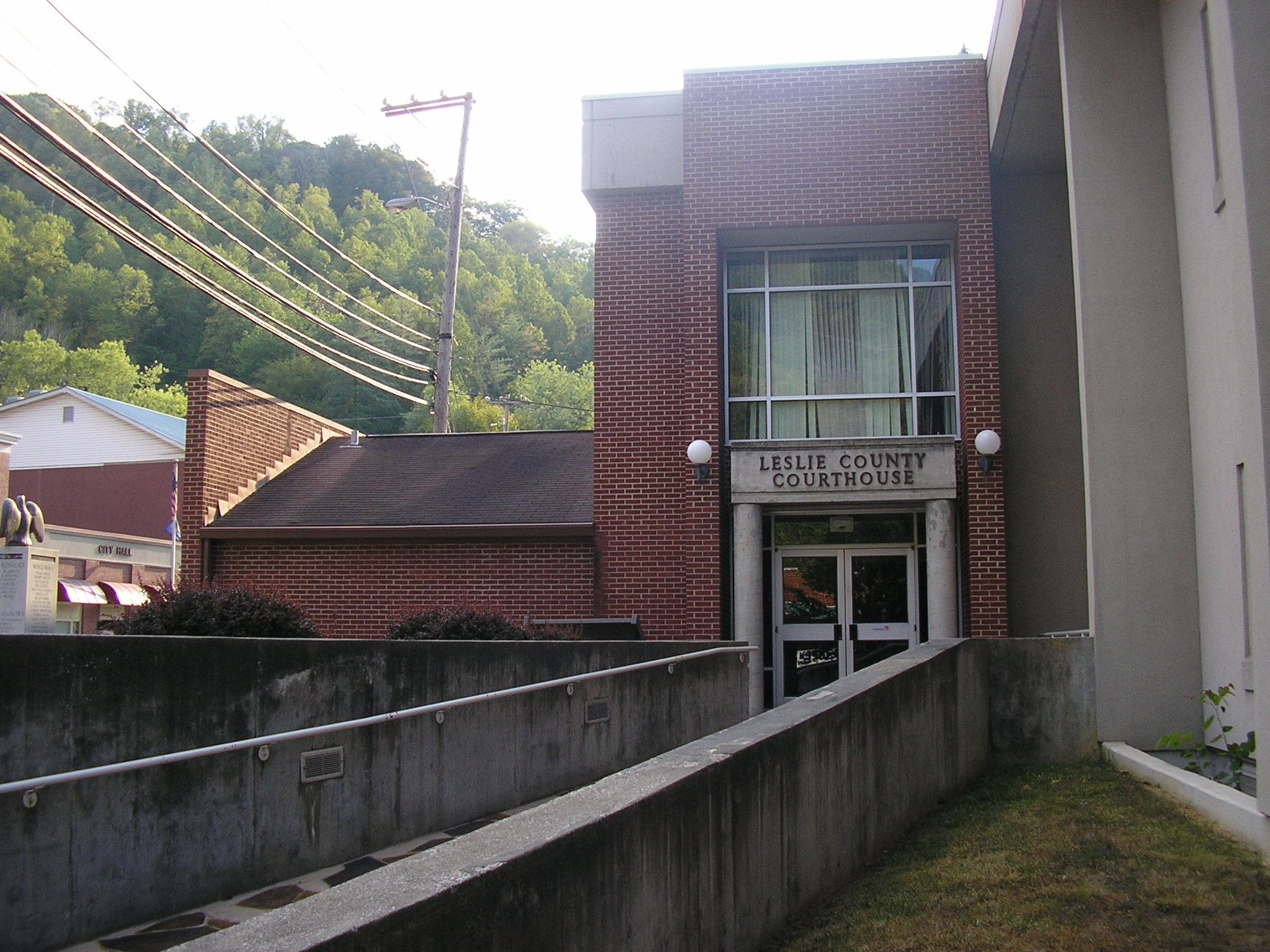
- Leslie County courthouse in Hyden

- Flag

- Location within the U.S. state of Kentucky
- Coordinates: 37°05′N 83°23′W
- Country: United States
- State: Kentucky
- Founded: 1878
- Named for: Preston Leslie
- Seat: Hyden
- Largest city: Hyden

Government
  - Judge/Executive: William Lewis (R)

Area
  - Total: 404 sq mi (1,050 km^{2})
  - Land: 401 sq mi (1,040 km^{2})
  - Water: 3.6 sq mi (9.3 km^{2}) 0.9%

Population (2020)
  - Total: 10,513
  - Estimate (2025): 9,627 ▼
  - Density: 26.2/sq mi (10.1/km^{2})
- Time zone: UTC−5 (Eastern)
  - Summer (DST): UTC−4 (EDT)
- Congressional district: 5th
- Website: lesliecounty.ky.gov

Leslie County is a county located in the U.S. state of Kentucky. Its county seat and largest city is Hyden. As of the 2020 census, the population was 10,513. It was formed in 1878 from portions of Clay, Harlan, and Perry counties, and named for Preston Leslie, governor of Kentucky from 1871 to 1875.

== History ==
Leslie County was formed in 1878 from portions of Clay, Harlan, and Perry counties, and named for governor Preston Leslie. Its county seat, Hyden, is named for state senator John Hyden, who was one of the commissioners that helped form the county.

On December 30, 1970, a blast occurred at the Finley Mine on Hurricane Creek. The blast resulted in the deaths of 38 men. Following the recovery of bodies, an investigation revealed a failure to enforce new safety laws. Traces of dynamite and Primacord were found inside the mine.

After resigning the presidency, Richard Nixon made his first public appearance, in July 1978, at the Leslie County dedication of a recreation facility named for him. County Judge-Executive C. Allen Muncy claimed the Nixon invitation prompted the U.S. Department of Justice to obtain indictments of him and his associates on vote-fraud charges; while on appeal for his conviction, he won renomination in the Republican primary but lost the 1981 general election to independent Kermit Keen.

== Geography ==
According to the U.S. Census Bureau, the county has a total area of 404 square miles (1,050 km^{2}), of which 401 square miles (1,040 km^{2}) is land and 3.6 square miles (9.3 km^{2}) (0.9%) is water.

=== Adjacent counties ===
- Perry County (northeast)
- Harlan County (southeast)
- Bell County (southwest)
- Clay County (west)

== Demographics ==
Historical population
Census	Pop.	Note	%±
1880	3,740		—
1890	3,964		6.0%
1900	6,753		70.4%
1910	8,976		32.9%
1920	10,097		12.5%
1930	10,765		6.6%
1940	14,981		39.2%
1950	15,537		3.7%
1960	10,941		−29.6%
1970	11,623		6.2%
1980	14,882		28.0%
1990	13,642		−8.3%
2000	12,401		−9.1%
2010	11,310		−8.8%
2020	10,513		−7.0%
2025 (est.)	9,627	▼	−8.4%
U.S. Decennial Census; 1790-1960 1900-1990; 1990-2000 2010-2021

=== 2020 census ===
As of the 2020 census, the county had a population of 10,513. The median age was 43.2 years. 21.6% of residents were under the age of 18 and 18.1% of residents were 65 years of age or older. For every 100 females there were 96.5 males, and for every 100 females age 18 and over there were 93.0 males age 18 and over.

The racial makeup of the county was 97.0% White, 0.4% Black or African American, 0.2% American Indian and Alaska Native, 0.2% Asian, 0.0% Native Hawaiian and Pacific Islander, 0.1% from some other race, and 2.1% from two or more races. Hispanic or Latino residents of any race comprised 0.7% of the population.

0.0% of residents lived in urban areas, while 100.0% lived in rural areas.

There were 4,241 households in the county, of which 29.0% had children under the age of 18 living with them and 27.8% had a female householder with no spouse or partner present. About 28.5% of all households were made up of individuals and 13.4% had someone living alone who was 65 years of age or older.

There were 4,872 housing units, of which 13.0% were vacant. Among occupied housing units, 80.7% were owner-occupied and 19.3% were renter-occupied. The homeowner vacancy rate was 0.4% and the rental vacancy rate was 6.6%.

=== 2000 census ===
As of the census of 2000, there were 12,401 people, 4,885 households, and 3,668 families residing in the county. The population density was 31 per square mile (12/km^{2}). There were 5,502 housing units at an average density of 14 per square mile (5.4/km^{2}).

The racial makeup of the county was 97.18% White, 0.07% Black or African American, 0.09% Native American, 0.12% Asian, 0.02% Pacific Islander, 0.05% from other races, and 0.50% from two or more races; 0.62% of the population were Hispanic or Latino of any race.

There were 4,885 households, out of which 35.50% had children under the age of 18 living with them, 58.30% were married couples living together, 12.90% had a female householder with no husband present, and 24.90% were non-families. 22.40% of all households were made up of individuals, and 8.70% had someone living alone who was 65 years of age or older. The average household size was 2.52 and the average family size was 2.94.

In the county, the population was spread out, with 24.60% under the age of 18, 9.20% from 18 to 24, 30.90% from 25 to 44, 23.90% from 45 to 64, and 11.50% who were 65 years of age or older. The median age was 36 years. For every 100 females there were 95.10 males. For every 100 females age 18 and over, there were 91.20 males.

The median income for a household in the county was $18,546, and the median income for a family was $22,225. Males had a median income of $28,708 versus $18,080 for females. The per capita income for the county was $10,429. About 30.20% of families and 32.70% of the population were below the poverty line, including 38.80% of those under age 18 and 27.00% of those age 65 or over.

== Life expectancy and health ==
Of 3,142 counties in the United States in 2014, the Institute for Health Metrics and Evaluation ranked Leslie County 3,120 in the average life expectancy at birth of male residents and 3,130 in the life expectancy of female residents. Life expectancy in Leslie county ranked in the bottom 10 percent among U.S. counties. Males in Leslie County lived an average of 70.0 years and females lived an average of 74.7 years compared to the national average for life expectancy of 76.7 for males and 81.5 for females. In the 1980-2014 period, the average life expectancy in Leslie County for females decreased by 4.0 years while male longevity decreased by 0.1 years compared to the national average for the same period of an increased life expectancy of 4.0 years for women and 6.7 years for men. Factors contributing to the short, and declining, life expectancy of residents of Leslie county included obesity, smoking, and low amounts of exercise.

In 2020, the Robert Wood Johnson Foundation ranked Leslie country 107 of 120 counties in Kentucky in "health outcomes," as measured by length and quality of life.

== Economy ==
=== Coal companies in Leslie County ===
- James River Coal Company

== Infrastructure ==
=== Transportation ===
Public transportation is provided by LKLP Community Action Partnership with demand-response service and scheduled service from Hyden to Hazard.

== Communities ==
=== City ===
- Hyden (county seat)

=== Unincorporated communities ===
- Asher
- Bear Branch
- Big Rock
- Causey
- Chappell
- Cinda
- Confluence
- Cutshin
- Essie
- Frew
- Grassy
- Hals Fork, Kentucky
- Hare
- Hell for Certain
- Helton
- Hoskinston
- Kaliopi
- Middlefork
- Mozelle
- Roark
- Sizerock
- Smilax
- Stinnett
- Thousandsticks
- Toulouse
- Warbranch
- Wendover
- Wooton
- Yeaddis

== Politics ==
United States presidential election results for Leslie County, Kentucky
Year	Republican		Democratic		Third party(ies)	
Year	No.	%	No.	%	No.	%
1912	606	52.97%	105	9.18%	433	37.85%
1916	1,516	91.60%	133	8.04%	6	0.36%
1920	2,576	94.22%	142	5.19%	16	0.59%
1924	2,052	88.91%	223	9.66%	33	1.43%
1928	2,806	94.45%	159	5.35%	6	0.20%
1932	2,810	82.96%	569	16.80%	8	0.24%
1936	2,716	81.39%	618	18.52%	3	0.09%
1940	3,292	83.96%	626	15.97%	3	0.08%
1944	2,679	84.30%	499	15.70%	0	0.00%
1948	2,397	73.94%	783	24.15%	62	1.91%
1952	3,239	81.81%	705	17.81%	15	0.38%
1956	3,770	87.37%	531	12.31%	14	0.32%
1960	3,894	83.05%	795	16.95%	0	0.00%
1964	1,971	52.23%	1,795	47.56%	8	0.21%
1968	2,615	71.08%	828	22.51%	236	6.41%
1972	3,299	77.88%	913	21.55%	24	0.57%
1976	3,770	71.52%	1,478	28.04%	23	0.44%
1980	3,536	71.86%	1,327	26.97%	58	1.18%
1984	3,385	75.64%	1,075	24.02%	15	0.34%
1988	3,280	74.39%	1,105	25.06%	24	0.54%
1992	2,879	58.33%	1,591	32.23%	466	9.44%
1996	2,296	56.14%	1,466	35.84%	328	8.02%
2000	3,159	71.24%	1,210	27.29%	65	1.47%
2004	3,661	73.75%	1,266	25.50%	37	0.75%
2008	3,574	81.28%	766	17.42%	57	1.30%
2012	4,439	89.62%	433	8.74%	81	1.64%
2016	4,015	89.38%	400	8.90%	77	1.71%
2020	4,321	89.78%	446	9.27%	46	0.96%
2024	3,908	89.67%	382	8.77%	68	1.56%

Leslie County is one of six counties or county equivalents that have voted Republican for president in every election since they came into existence. (Note: Along with Doniphan County, Kansas (since 1864); Colonial Heights, Virginia (since 1952); Poquoson, Virginia (since 1976); Chugach Census Area, Alaska (since 2020); and Copper River Census Area, Alaska (since 2020).) In 1892, 1908, and 1916 it was the most Republican county in the nation. Leslie's fierce Unionist sympathies, so strong that areas surrounding it contributed more troops to the Union Army relative to population than any other part of the United States, meant that between 1896 and 1928 no Democrat could receive even ten percent of the county's vote, and none received so much as twenty-five percent until Lyndon Johnson managed over 47 percent in his landslide national triumph against Barry Goldwater in 1964.

Despite Goldwater's relatively poor performance, every Republican candidate since the county's formation has obtained an absolute majority in Leslie County, and only William Howard Taft in the divided 1912 election, George H. W. Bush in 1992, and Bob Dole in 1996 have otherwise received under seventy percent for the GOP. Both Mitt Romney and Donald Trump received almost ninety percent of the vote in this county, making Leslie the strongest GOP county in Kentucky (see chart below).

=== Elected officials ===
Elected officials as of January 3, 2025
U.S. House	Hal Rogers (R)	KY 5
Ky. Senate	Brandon Smith (R)	30
Ky. House	Derek Lewis (R)	90

== Notable people ==
- Elmer Begley, secretary of state of Kentucky from 1968 to 1970
- Roger Bowling, songwriter
- Hugh X. Lewis, country music singer-songwriter
- William Lewis, former U.S. Representative from Kentucky
- Bobby Osborne, bluegrass musician
- Sonny Osborne, bluegrass musician
- Willie Sandlin, soldier in the U.S. Army who received the Medal of Honor for his actions in World War I

== See also ==
- Dry counties
- National Register of Historic Places listings in Leslie County, Kentucky
