= James Frew =

James Frew might refer to:

- James Frew, founder of Frewville, South Australia
- Jimmy Frew (footballer, born 1892), Scottish footballer
- Jimmy Frew (footballer, born 1895) (1895–1985), Scottish footballer
