= Cornettsville, Kentucky =

Unincorporated community in Kentucky, United States

Cornettsville
- Unincorporated community
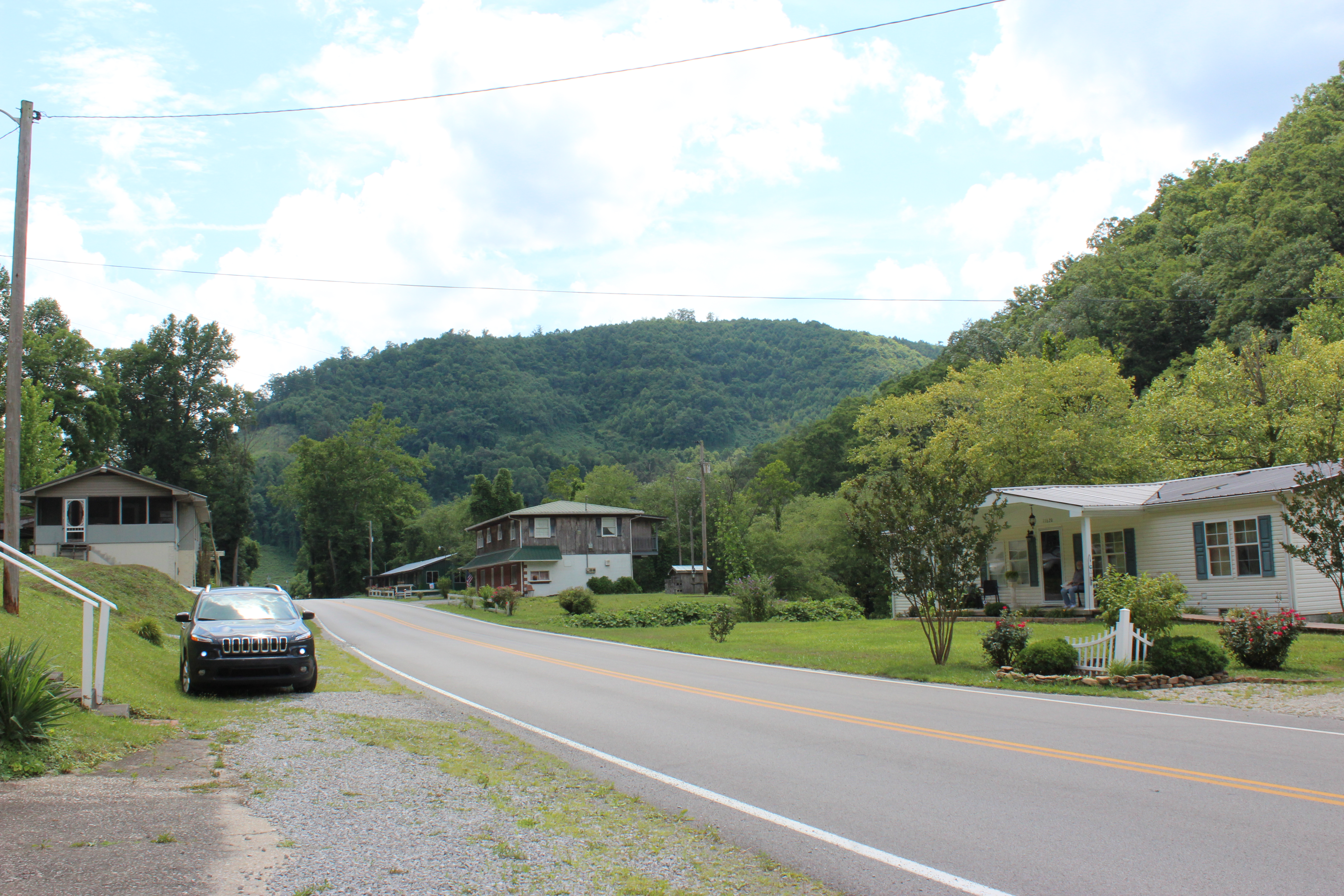
- Houses in Cornettsville

- Location within the state of Kentucky Cornettsville (the United States)
- Coordinates: 37°08′02″N 83°04′37″W
- Country: United States
- State: Kentucky
- County: Perry
- Elevation: 932 ft (284 m)

Population (2000)
  - Total: 792
- Time zone: UTC-5 (Eastern (EST))
  - Summer (DST): UTC-4 (EDT)
- ZIP codes: 41731
- Area code: 606
- GNIS feature ID: 490126

Cornettsville is an unincorporated community in Perry County, Kentucky, United States, within the state's eastern mountain region known for coal mining. The population is 792 as of the 2000 United States Census. The town was named for one of the early pioneers to the area, William Jesse Cornett, whose log cabin and burial site can still be seen today.

== Geography ==
Cornettsville is located at 37°08′02″N 83°04′37″W, with an elevation of approximately 932 feet (284 m). The town is located in the Eastern Mountain Coal Fields region of Kentucky and it is in the eastern time zone of the United States. The zip code for Cornettsville is 41731.
