= DESOTO patrol =

U.S. Navy signals intelligence operations

DESOTO patrols (DeHaven Special Operations off TsingtaO) were patrols conducted by U.S. Navy destroyers equipped with a mobile "van" (a modified steel shipping container) containing signals-intelligence equipment used for intelligence collection in hostile waters. The USS De Haven became the namesake for these patrols. De Haven performed the first patrol off the coast of China in April 1962. The USS Agerholm carried out the first patrol to target North Vietnam in the Gulf of Tonkin in December 1962.

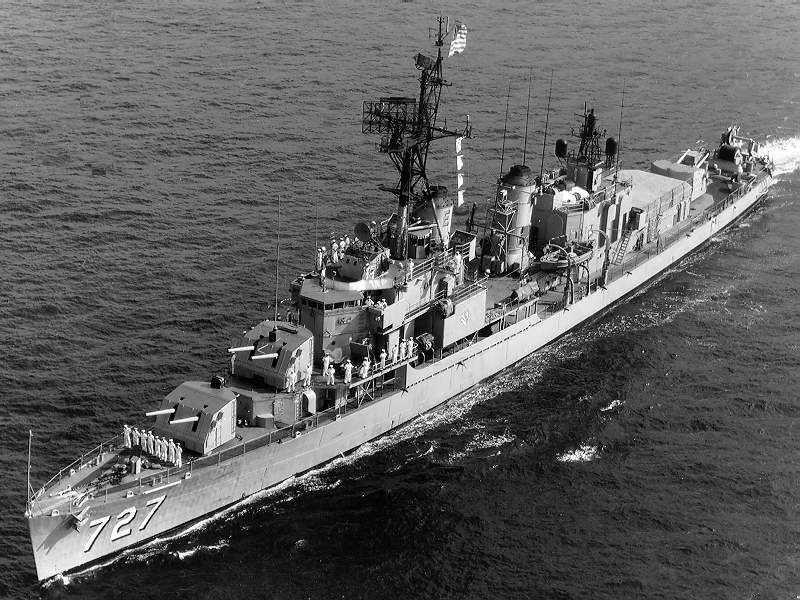
USS De Haven

These patrols were initially a response to the Chinese government's re-definition of their territorial waters to include all waters shoreward from lines drawn tangentially to, and between, twelve-mile radii from their offshore islands. Such a declaration represented an expansion of their claims. This inhibited the lawful navigation by the US navy and increased the likelihood and frequency of formal diplomatic "serious warnings" issued by Beijing, when any Seventh Fleet units navigated through these areas. This became a situation to which Commander Seventh Fleet felt compelled to respond.

These types of patrols had previously been conducted off the coasts of the Soviet Union, China, and North Korea, but are perhaps of greatest significance for their role in the Vietnam War. There were three components to the purpose of these patrols. First, they would establish and maintain the presence of the U.S. Seventh Fleet in the international waters off the China coast and later the Vietnamese coast. Second, they would serve as a minor Cold War irritant to the Chinese Communists. Third, they would collect as much intelligence as possible during the patrols.

The DESOTO patrols off Vietnam from 1963 onwards formed part of a larger scheme known as Operation 34A. Run by the Department of Defense at the time, Operation 34A, or "OPLAN 34Alpha" was a top-secret program consisting primarily of covert actions against the North Vietnamese.

== Patrols and SIGADs ==
The naval Direct Support Units (DSUs) based out of the U.S. Naval Communication Station, Philippines, in San Miguel, Philippines (SIGAD USN-27) used the SIGAD USN-467 as a generic designator for their missions. Each specific patrol received a letter suffix for its duration. The subsequent mission would receive the next letter in an alphabetic sequence.

=== Declassified SIGADs ===
The following table lists the patrols that have been declassified.

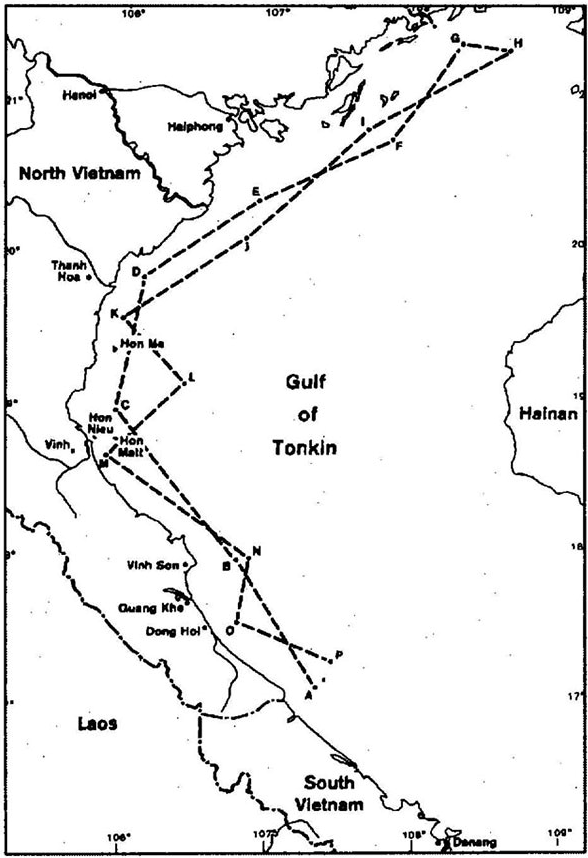
DESOTO patrol mission map off Vietnam.

Patrol Number	Patrol Dates	Primary Patrol Ship	SIGAD
1	14–20 April 1962	USS De Haven	USN-467?
9	December 1964	USS Agerholm	USN-467?
?	25 February - 12 March 1964	USS John R. Craig	USN-467Y
18	28 July - 23 August 1964	USS Maddox	USN-467N
19	14–21 September 1964	USS Morton	USN-467P
20	1–15 October 1964	USS Richard S. Edwards	USN-467R-1
21	15 October - 14 November 1964	USS Morton	USN-467R-2
22	8–14 November 1964	USS Richard S. Edwards	USN-467S
23	14 November - 27 December 1964	USS Richard S. Edwards	USN-467R-3
24	8–14 February 1965	USS Towers	USN-467D
25	15 February - 19 March 1965	USS Buchanan	USN-467D
26	19 March - 21 April 1965	USN-27/USS Buchanan	USN-467D

== Gulf of Tonkin Incident ==
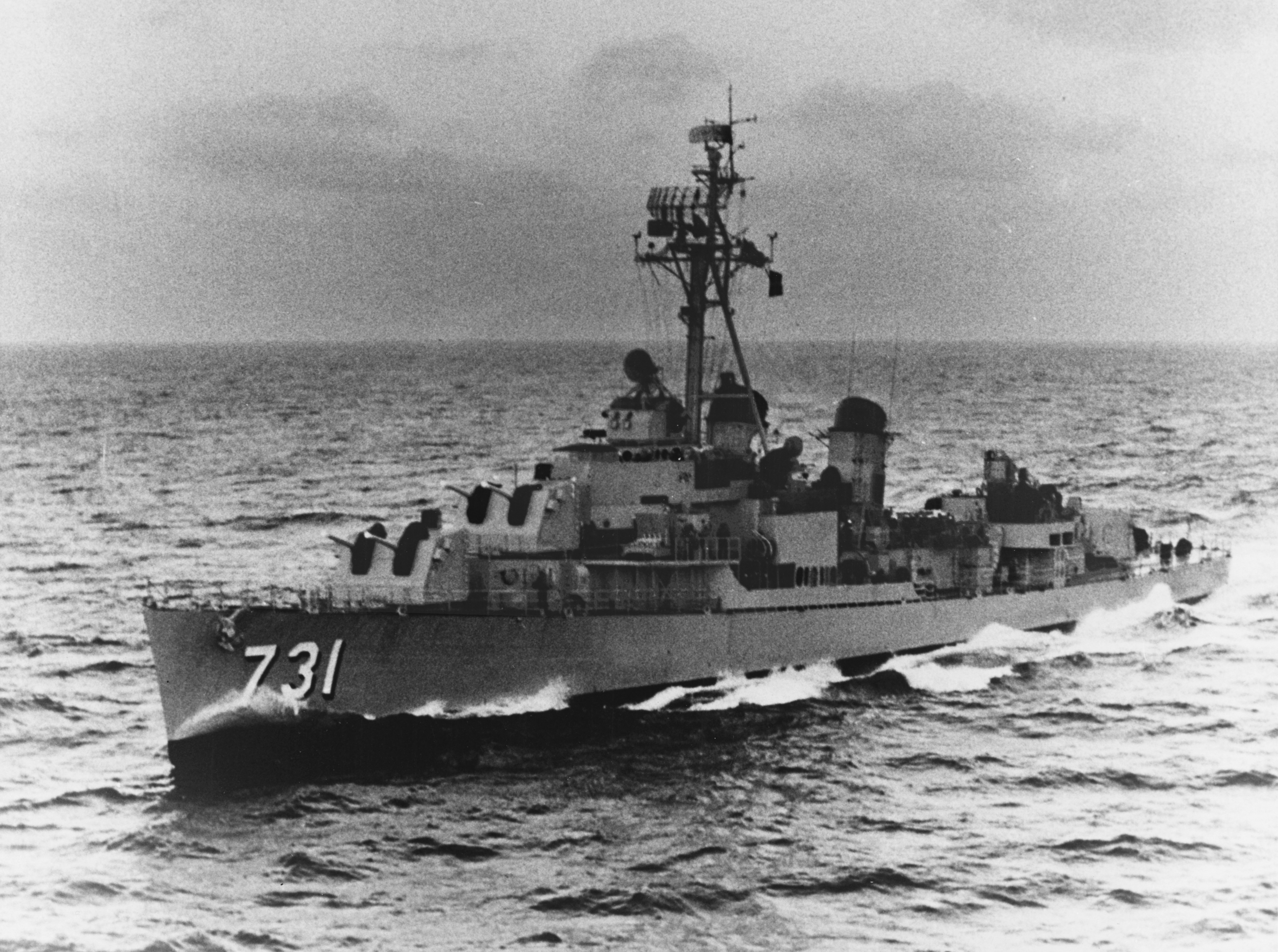
USS Maddox

SIGAD USN-467N specifically designates the DSU aboard USS Maddox during the patrol involved with the Gulf of Tonkin incident. This patrol was 18th DESOTO type patrol (each with a Naval Security Group detachment embarked) conducted since 1962. On August 2, 1964, the destroyer Maddox, engaged three North Vietnamese Navy torpedo boats of the 135th Torpedo Squadron. A sea battle resulted, in which Maddox expended over two hundred and eighty 3-inch (76 mm) and 5-inch (127 mm) shells, and in which four USN F-8 Crusader jet fighter bombers strafed the torpedo boats. One US aircraft was damaged, one 14.5-millimeter (0.57 in) round hit the destroyer, three North Vietnamese torpedo boats were damaged, and four North Vietnamese sailors were killed and six were wounded; there were no U.S. casualties.

== Post Gulf of Tonkin Engagement ==
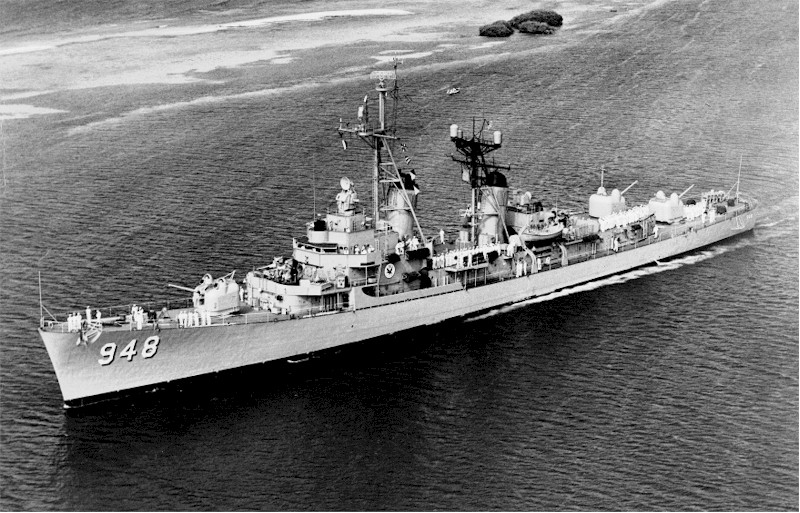
USS Morton

Even after the Gulf of Tonkin incident, the DESOTO patrols continued. On 11 September 1964 the Director of the Naval Security Group, Pacific (DIRNAVSECGRUPAC) informed the Director of the NSA (DIRNSA) of plans for an intercept team, SIGAD USN-467P, to be aboard USS Morton. The patrol was conducted by USS Morton and USS Richard S. Edwards approximately one month after the Gulf of Tonkin incident. During this patrol Morton fired upon five fast closing targets, but was unable to confirm the targets visually. Based on radar surveillance the patrol claimed hits on three of the targets.

== See also ==
- Gulf of Tonkin Incident
- National Security Agency
- Naval Security Group
- Signals Intelligence
- USS Liberty Incident
- USS Pueblo Incident
