= Yeaddiss, Kentucky =

Unincorporated community in Kentucky, United States

- Unincorporated community
- Location in Kentucky Location in the United States
- Coordinates: 37°4′7″N 83°13′4″W
- Country: United States
- State: Kentucky
- County: Leslie
- Established: 1873
- Elevation: 1,125 ft (343 m)
- Time zone: UTC-5 (Eastern (EST))
  - Summer (DST): UTC-4 (EDT)
- ZIP codes: 41777
- Area code: 606
- GNIS feature ID: 516500

Yeaddiss is an unincorporated community located in Leslie County, Kentucky, United States.
