= Joseph Frew =

Scottish footballer

Personal information
- Full name: Joseph Frew
- Date of birth: 1873
- Place of birth: Stevenston, Scotland
- Position: Inside forward

Senior career*
Years	Team	Apps	(Gls)
1894–1895	Stevenston Thistle		
1895–1896	Sheffield United	4	(1)
1896–1897	Glossop North End		
1897–1898	Stevenston Thistle		
1898–1899	Wishaw Thistle		
1900	Stevenston Thistle		
Total		4	(1)
- * Club domestic league appearances and goals

Joseph Frew (1873–unknown) was a Scottish footballer who played in the Football League for Sheffield United.
