= Roderick McIntosh Farm =

- McIntosh, Roderick, Farm
- U.S. National Register of Historic Places
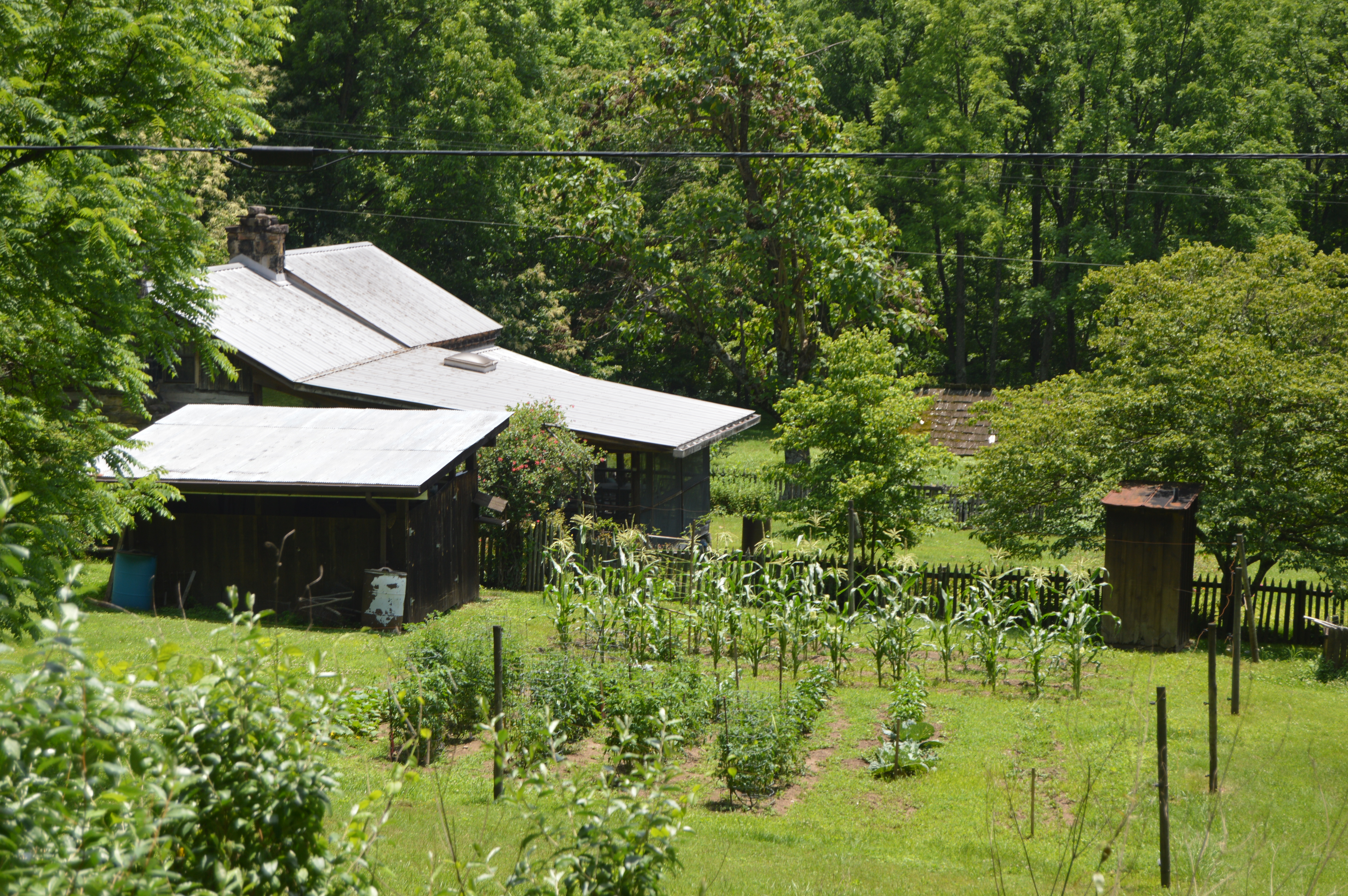
- Location: South of Dry Hill-McIntosh Rd. on the confluence of McIntosh and Cutshin Creeks, near Dryhill, Kentucky
- Coordinates: 37°12′21″N 83°20′13″W
- Area: 40 acres (16 ha)
- Built: 1816
- Built by: McIntosh, Roderick
- Architectural style: Split-log cabin
- NRHP reference No.: 91001666
- Added to NRHP: November 7, 1991

The Roderick McIntosh Farm, near Dryhill, Kentucky, dates from 1816. It was listed on the National Register of Historic Places in 1991. It has also been known as the W.P. Morton Farm.

The house is a "saddlebag house that tradition holds was constructed between 1810 and 1830."
