= Smilax, Kentucky =

Unincorporated community in Kentucky, United States

- Unincorporated community
- Location in Kentucky Location in the United States
- Coordinates: 37°8′8″N 83°16′56″W
- Country: United States
- State: Kentucky
- County: Leslie
- Elevation: 919 ft (280 m)
- Time zone: UTC-5 (Eastern (EST))
  - Summer (DST): UTC-4 (EDT)
- ZIP codes: 41764
- GNIS feature ID: 515500

Smilax is an unincorporated community located in Leslie County, Kentucky, United States.
