= Cutshin, Kentucky =

Unincorporated community in Kentucky, United States

- Unincorporated community
- Location in Kentucky Location in the United States
- Coordinates: 37°5′20″N 83°15′18″W
- Country: United States
- State: Kentucky
- County: Leslie
- Elevation: 1,014 ft (309 m)
- Time zone: UTC-5 (Eastern (EST))
  - Summer (DST): UTC-4 (EDT)
- ZIP codes: 41732
- GNIS feature ID: 511692

Cutshin is an unincorporated community located in Leslie County, Kentucky, United States. Its post office closed in 1996.
