= Wooton, Kentucky =

Unincorporated community in Kentucky, United States

- Unincorporated community
- Location in Kentucky Location in the United States
- Coordinates: 37°10′44″N 83°18′8″W
- Country: United States
- State: Kentucky
- County: Leslie
- Elevation: 876 ft (267 m)
- Time zone: UTC-5 (Eastern (EST))
  - Summer (DST): UTC-4 (EDT)
- ZIP codes: 41776
- GNIS feature ID: 516481

Wooton is an unincorporated community located in Leslie County, Kentucky, United States.

Wooton was home to the first Works Progress Administration (WPA) pack horse library in Kentucky in 1934. The library was located in the Wooton Community Center.
