= Kentucky Route 15 =

Highway in Kentucky

Kentucky Route 15
- KY 15; mainline in red, business routes in blue

Route information
- Maintained by KYTC
- Length: 131.418 mi (211.497 km)

Major junctions
- South end: US 119 in Whitesburg
- Hal Rogers Parkway / KY 80 in Hazard; Mountain Parkway in Campton; Mountain Parkway / KY 82 in Clay City
- North end: US 60 in Winchester

Location
- Country: United States
- State: Kentucky
- Counties: Letcher, Knott, Perry, Breathitt, Wolfe, Powell, Clark

Highway system
- Kentucky State Highway System; Interstate; US; State; Parkways
← KY 14	→ KY 16

Kentucky Route 15 begins at a junction of US 119/Corridor F & Business KY 15 in Whitesburg, and terminates in Winchester at US 60. It is a major route, connecting the coalfields of the Cumberland Plateau with Lexington and other cities in the Bluegrass region. The segment from Whitesburg to KY 15 at Campton, which in turn connects to the Mountain Parkway near the town, is also the primary part of Corridor I of the Appalachian Development Highway System.

== Future ==
Currently, KY 15 is being relocated onto a new four-lane divided alignment in phases. Construction on section 17 of the relocation project is from KY 205 at Vancleve to Fivemile; construction began on January 6, 2005, at a cost of $36.4 million and is 100% complete. Work is finished on section 16 from Fivemile to Wolverine;. There are additional plans to reconstruct the segment from Jackson south to Hazard on new alignment beginning in 2008.

The current construction is progressing from Vancleve to Jackson. Local reports suggest that the roadway will be opening for traffic flow by the summer of 2013. Construction of the section between Jackson and Haddix, KY has not started. The current budget crisis and lowered revenues for state and federal construction projects may delay groundbreaking on that section for years. (Updated June 2013)

Currently (Jan. 2021), construction is nearing completion north of Hazard. This section was expanded to four lanes from the Hazard bypass to Speedway Road. This project was designed to replace one of the heaviest used sections of two way, two lane traffic in Kentucky. The upgrade involved replacing several bridges and making large cuts to accommodate the widened roadway. An access road was added to allow traffic to enter and exit at Bonnyman near the post office. No projected date of construction has been made public for the section of roadway from Jackson to the current expansion.

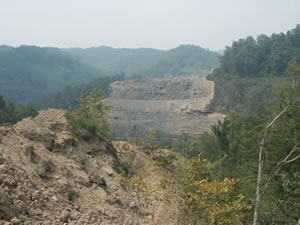
Looking north across Frozen Creek and KY 1812.

== Major intersections ==
County	Location	mi	km	Destinations	Notes
Letcher	Whitesburg	0.000	0.000	KY 15X (Jenkins Road) / US 119 to US 23 – Jenkins, Cumberland	Southern terminus of business route
Letcher	Whitesburg	1.389	2.235	KY 15 Conn. east to KY 15X – Letcher County Veterans Memorial Museum	Western terminus of connector road
Letcher	Whitesburg	2.284	3.676	KY 15X south / KY 931 north (Hazard Road) – Whitesburg, Colson	Northern terminus of business route; south end of KY 931 overlap
Letcher		2.736	4.403	KY 931 south (Whitco Road) – Gordon	North end of KY 931 overlap
Letcher		3.918	6.305	KY 3401 south (Uz-Dry Fork Road)	Northern terminus of KY 3401
Letcher		4.794	7.715	KY 3402 north	Southern terminus of KY 3402
Letcher	Van	6.225	10.018	KY 1811 north (Smoot Creek Road) / KY 160 south (Hickory Road) – Roxana, Gordon	Southern terminus of KY 1811; south end of KY 160 overlap
Letcher		8.911	14.341	KY 1148 east – Colson	Western terminus of KY 1148
Letcher	Isom	9.216	14.832	KY 7 north – Deane, Mountain Motor Speedway	South end of KY 7 concurrency
Letcher		9.876	15.894	KY 7 south – Letcher, Blackey, Leatherwood Battlefield, Brashearville	North end of KY 7 concurrency
Knott		15.262	24.562	KY 160 north – Hindman, Alice Lloyd College	North end of KY 160 overlap
Knott		16.945	27.270	KY 1231 north (Big Branch Road)	Southern terminus of KY 1231
Knott		17.375	27.962	Carr Creek State Park	
Knott		20.435	32.887	KY 1088 west (Main Street) – Sassafras	Eastern terminus of KY 1088
Perry	Vicco	21.253	34.203	KY 1095 south (Main Street)	Northern terminus of KY 1095
Perry		26.846	43.204	KY 7 south (Ken Mount Road) – Jeff, Viper, Leatherwood, Leatherwood Battlefield, Brashearville	Northern terminus of KY 7
Perry	Glomawr	29.581	47.606	KY 451 north (Christopher Road)	Southern terminus of KY 451
Perry		29.970	48.232	KY 1096 (Fourseam Buffalo Road)	
Perry	Hazard	31.795	51.169	KY 15 Bus. north (Main Street)	Southern terminus of Hazard business route
Perry	Hazard	32.515	52.328	KY 451 Conn. south to KY 451	Northern terminus of connector road
Perry	Hazard	33.933	54.610	KY 15 Bus. south	Northern terminus of Hazard business route
Perry	Hazard	34.351	55.283	KY 80 west / KY 550 east	Interchange; western terminus of KY 550; south end of KY 80 overlap
Perry	Hazard	35.861	57.713	KY 80 east – Prestonsburg, Pikeville	Interchange; north end of KY 80 overlap; ramp from EB Hal Rogers Parkway to KY 15 south of intersection
Perry	Hazard	36.023	57.973	Hal Rogers Parkway west – London	Interchange; eastern terminus of Hal Rogers Parkway; parkway exit 59; ramp from WB KY 80 to KY 15 just east of here
Perry	Bonnyman	36.608	58.915	KY 267 (Harveyton Road/Typo Road) – Harveyton, Typo	
Perry		40.518	65.207	KY 1067 north (Fifteenmile Branch Road)	Southern terminus of KY 1067
Perry		41.399	66.625	KY 28 west – Buckhorn, Booneville, Buckhorn Lake State Resort Park	Eastern terminus of KY 28
Breathitt	Ned	46.372	74.628	KY 2446 south	Northern terminus of KY 2446
Breathitt		49.890	80.290	KY 1278 south – Watts	Northern terminus of KY 1278
Breathitt	Lost Creek	53.582	86.232	KY 476 south – Riverside, Clayhole	Northern terminus of KY 476
Breathitt	Haddix	55.019	88.544	KY 1110 south	Northern terminus of KY 1110
Breathitt	Jackson	60.487	97.344	KY 1098 west / KY 1812 north (Quicksand Road)	Eastern terminus of KY 1098; southern terminus of KY 1812
Breathitt	Jackson	60.741	97.753	KY 30 east – Sugar Creek Golf Course, Julian Carroll Airport	South end of KY 30 overlap
Breathitt	Jackson	62.593	100.734	KY 1812 north / KY 3068 west (Main Street)	South end of KY 1812 overlap; eastern terminus of KY 3068
Breathitt	Jackson	62.813	101.088	Jetts Drive (KY 3232 east)	
Breathitt	Jackson	63.289	101.854	KY 1812 south (Washington Avenue)	North end of KY 1812 overlap
Breathitt	Jackson	63.740	102.580	KY 30 west (Park Road) to KY 52 – Booneville	North end of KY 30 overlap
Breathitt		65.699	105.732	KY 205 south	South end of KY 205 overlap
Breathitt		66.802	107.507	KY 205 north	North end of KY 205 overlap
Breathitt		68.164	109.699	KY 1812 south	South end of KY 1812 overlap
Breathitt	Vancleve	69.164	111.309	KY 205 / KY 1812 north to Mountain Parkway east	Interchange; 205 both ways, 1812 to the north; north end of KY 1812 overlap
Wolfe	Bethany	73.200	117.804	KY 1261 south	South end of KY 1261 overlap
Wolfe	Bethany	73.239	117.867	KY 1261 north	North end of KY 1261 overlap
Wolfe		77.059	124.014	KY 2028 south (Flat Mary Road) – Flat, Mary	Northern terminus of KY 2028
Wolfe		80.199	129.068	KY 2491 Conn. north to KY 2491	Southern terminus of connector road
Wolfe		80.377	129.354	KY 3355 (Elkins Road) to KY 2491	
Wolfe	Campton	81.022	130.392	KY 15 Spur north (Mountain Parkway Spur) to Mountain Parkway / KY 191 east (Drake Street) – Winchester, Stanton, Campton, Hazel Green	Southern terminus of KY 15 Spur; western terminus of KY 191
Wolfe		82.239	132.351	KY 651 south (Bear Pen Road)	Northern terminus of KY 651
Wolfe		84.897	136.628	KY 1653 east to Mountain Parkway – Campton	Western terminus of KY 1653
Wolfe		85.129– 85.422	137.002– 137.473	Mountain Parkway – Lexington, Campton	Interchange; Mountain Parkway exit 40
Wolfe		84.455	135.917	KY 3040 east (Hobbs Road)	Western terminus of KY 3040
Wolfe		85.555	137.687	KY 715 south – Beattyville	South end of KY 715 overlap
Wolfe	Pine Ridge	86.389	139.030	KY 715 north (Sky Bridge Road)	North end of KY 715 overlap
Powell	Slade	93.704	150.802	KY 11 south (Natural Bridge Road) to Mountain Parkway – Natural Bridge State Resort Park, Beattyville, Prestonsburg, Lexington	South end of KY 11 concurrency
Powell		95.200	153.210	KY 77 south (Nada Tunnel Road) – Nada Tunnel, Red River Gorge	Northern terminus of KY 77
Powell		97.652	157.156	KY 1639 south (South Fork Road)	Northern terminus of KY 1639
Powell	Bowen	99.517	160.157	KY 613 east (Little North Fork Road)	Western terminus of KY 613
Powell		102.535	165.014	KY 3354 south (Cat Creek Road)	Northern terminus of KY 3354
Powell	Rosslyn	103.015	165.787	KY 1184 north (Little North Bend Road)	Southern terminus of KY 1184
Powell	Stanton	105.744	170.178	KY 213 (Main Street) to Mountain Parkway – Furnace, Jeffersonville	
Powell	Stanton	105.791	170.254	KY 2486 north (Washington Street)	Southern terminus of KY 2486
Powell	Stanton	106.325	171.114	KY 2073 north (Halls Lane)	Southern terminus of KY 2073
Powell	Clay City	109.298	175.898	KY 2480 north (10th Avenue)	Southern terminus of KY 2480
Powell	Clay City	109.741	176.611	KY 1057 east (11th Street)	Western terminus of KY 1057
Powell	Clay City	109.978	176.992	KY 2026 east (Pompeii Road) / KY 2481 south (9th Street)	Western terminus of KY 2026; northern terminus of KY 2481
Powell	Clay City	110.513	177.853	KY 2479 north (3rd Street)	Southern terminus of KY 2479
Powell	Clay City	110.949	178.555	KY 11 north (Black Creek Road) – Bluegrass Council Scouting Reservation, Camp McKee	North end of KY 11 concurrency
Powell	Clay City	111.466	179.387	KY 3022 north (Lofty Heights Road)	Southern terminus of KY 3022
Powell	Clay City	111.478– 111.511	179.406– 179.460	Mountain Parkway east – Lexington	Interchange; Mountain Parkway exit 16
Powell	Clay City	111.613	179.624	Mountain Parkway west / KY 82 west (Irvine Road) – Campton, Irvine	Eastern terminus of KY 82; ramp to parkway to the south, 82 to the west; 15 turns north
Powell		112.904	181.701	KY 3352 south (Virden Ridge Road)	Northern terminus of KY 3352
Clark	Goffs Corner	117.692	189.407	KY 974 (Kiddville Road/Trapp-Goffs Corner Road) to Mountain Parkway	
Clark	Pilot View	122.295	196.815	KY 3368 north (Schollsville Road)	Southern terminus of KY 3368
Clark		128.086	206.134	KY 1958	
Clark		128.718	207.152	KY 1960 east (Ecton Road)	Western terminus of KY 1960
Clark	Winchester	129.449	208.328	US 60 (North Main Street)	
1.000 mi = 1.609 km; 1.000 km = 0.621 mi: Concurrency terminus

== Special routes ==
=== Kentucky Route 15X ===
Kentucky Route 15X
- Location: Whitesburg, Letcher County
- Length: 2.838 mi (4.567 km)

Kentucky Route 15 Business in Whitesburg, in Letcher County, signed as KY 15X, is the business route of KY 15 in Whitesburg. It begins at KY 15's southern terminus and ends at KY 15 north of town. The route is 2.838 miles (4.567 km) long.

=== Kentucky Route 15 Connector ===
Kentucky Route 15 Connector
- Location: Whitesburg, Letcher County
- Length: 0.24 mi (390 m)

Kentucky Route 15 Connector (KY 15C) provides access from KY 15 to KY 15X and the Letcher County Veterans Memorial Museum in Whitesburg. It is 0.24 miles (0.39 km) long.

=== Kentucky Route 15 Business (Hazard) ===
Kentucky Route 15 Business
- Location: Hazard, Perry County
- Length: 2.306 mi (3.711 km)

Kentucky Route 15 Business (KY 15 BUS) is a business route of KY 15 in Hazard, Perry County. It is the original alignment of KY 15 through the city. It is 2.306 miles (3.711 km) long.

=== Kentucky Route 15 Spur ===
Kentucky Route 15 Spur
- Location: Campton, Wolfe County
- Length: 1.058 mi (1.703 km)

Kentucky Route 15 Spur (KY 15 Spur) is the spur route connecting KY 15 with the Bert T. Combs Mountain Parkway's Exit 46 interchange at Campton, in Wolfe County. The length of this alignment is 1.058 miles (1.703 km) long. This roadway is not accessible from the Mountain Parkway's westbound lanes.
