= Kentucky Route 451 =

Highway in Kentucky

Kentucky Route 451
- KY 451 highlighted in red

Route information
- Maintained by KYTC
- Length: 19.947 mi (32.102 km)

Major junctions
- South end: KY 15 southeast of Glomawr
- KY 80 northeast of Avawam
- North end: KY 28 in Chavies

Location
- Country: United States
- State: Kentucky
- Counties: Perry

Highway system
- Kentucky State Highway System; Interstate; US; State; Parkways
← KY 450	→ KY 452

Kentucky Route 451 (KY 451) is a 19.947-mile-long (32.102 km) state highway in the U.S. state of Kentucky. The highway connects mostly rural areas of Perry County with Hazard.

== Route description ==
=== Southern terminus to Hazard ===
KY 451 begins at an intersection with KY 15 southeast of Glomawr, within the central part of Perry County. It travels to the northwest and immediately enters Glomawr. It crosses over the North Fork Kentucky River and some railroad tracks of CSX. It curves to the southwest and then to the north-northwest. The highway travels through Diablock and then Christopher. It curves to the north-northeast and begins paralleling the river. It curves to the west and enters Hazard. It curves to the north-northwest and temporarily leaves the river. It curves to the northeast and rejoins the river. It curves to the west-southwest and intersects the western terminus of KY 2448 (Kentucky Boulevard). It then begins a brief concurrency with KY 15 Bus. (South Main Street). The two highways head to the northwest and split on the southeastern edge of Triangle Park. When KY 451 splits off, it turns to the left and travels to the southwest. It crosses over the North Fork Kentucky River on the William D. Gorman Bridge. It then crosses over some railroad tracks and then Messer Branch before it travels under an overpass the carries KY 15 (Johnny Cox All-American Drive). It intersects the southern terminus of KY 451 Conn. It curves to the southwest and leaves the city limits of Hazard.

=== Hazard to northern terminus ===
KY 451 winds its way to the northwest and begins to parallel Curly Fork. It curves to the west and crosses over that fork. KY 451 then curves back to the northwest and intersects the northern terminus of KY 6239 (Crawford Lane). Immediately afterward is an interchange with the Hal Rogers Parkway. The highway crosses over Big Creek and then begins a very brief concurrency with KY 80. The two highways travel to the south-southwest and curve to the west-northwest. After they split, KY 451 winds its way to the west-southwest and makes a gradual curve to the northwest. It crosses over Little Willard Creek and begins paralleling it. The highway crosses over the creek twice more before curving to the west-southwest. It begins a concurrency with KY 2021 (Big Willard Road). The two highways enter Busy, where they split. KY 451 curves to the south-southwest and begins to parallel some railroad tracks of CSX. It crosses over Big Willard Creek, curves to the west, and curves to the northwest. It then crosses over those railroad tracks and then parallels the North Fork Kentucky River. The highway travels through Yerkes. It curves to the west-northwest and crosses over those railroad tracks again and begins to parallel Colwell Fork. It curves to the west-southwest and crosses over the fork. It gradually winds its way to the north-northwest and then begins paralleling Campbell Creek. The highway curves to the northeast and crosses over the creek before curving to the north-northwest. It crosses over the creek again before entering Krypton. It curves to the northwest and crosses over the creek before leaving the community. The highway begins paralleling railroad tracks of CSX before curving to the northwest. It crosses over Gunner and then Lick branches before curving to the northeast. It curves to the northwest and crosses over Napier Branch. It curves to the west-southwest and begins to parallel Oldhouse Branch. It curves to the north-northwest, crosses over that branch, and curves to the north-northeast. The highway crosses over Eversole Creek before it meets its northern terminus, an intersection with KY 28 in Chavies.

== Major intersections ==
The entire route is in Perry County.

Location	mi	km	Destinations	Notes
	0.000	0.000	KY 15	Southern terminus
Hazard	3.087	4.968	KY 2448 east (Kentucky Boulevard)	Western terminus of KY 2448
Hazard	3.470	5.584	KY 15 Bus. south (South Main Street) to KY 15	Southern end of KY 15 Bus. concurrency
Hazard	3.470	5.584	KY 15 Bus. north	Northern end of KY 15 Bus. concurrency
Hazard	3.561	5.731	William D. Gorman Bridge	Crossing of the North Fork Kentucky River
Hazard	3.822	6.151	KY 451 Conn. north to KY 15	Southern terminus of KY 451 Conn.
	7.575	12.191	KY 6239 south (Crawford Lane)	Northern terminus of KY 6239
	7.656	12.321	Hal Rogers Parkway	Hal Rogers Parkway exit 56
	7.718	12.421	KY 80 east	Southern end of KY 80 concurrency
	7.718	12.421	KY 80 west	Northern end of KY 80 concurrency
	10.792	17.368	KY 2021 west (Big Willard Road)	Southern end of KY 2021 concurrency
Busy	11.050	17.783	KY 2021 east (Couchtown Road)	Northern end of KY 2021 concurrency
Chavies	19.947	32.102	KY 28 – Buckhorn Lake State Resort Park	Northern terminus
1.000 mi = 1.609 km; 1.000 km = 0.621 mi: Concurrency terminus

== Hazard connector route ==
Kentucky Route 451 Connector
- Location: Hazard
- Length: 0.235 mi (378 m)

Kentucky Route 451 Connector (KY 451 Conn.) is a 0.235-mile-long (0.378 km) state highway in the U.S. state of Kentucky. The highway travels through urban areas of Hazard, within Perry County.

KY 451 Conn. begins at an intersection with the KY 451 mainline (Town Mountain Road) in the central part of Hazard, within Perry County. It travels to the northwest and winds its way to the east-northeast. It then meets its northern terminus, an intersection with KY 15 (Johnny Cox All-American Drive).

The entire route is in Hazard, Perry County.

mi	km	Destinations	Notes
0.000	0.000	KY 451 (Town Mountain Road)	Southern terminus
0.235	0.378	KY 15 (Johnny Cox All-American Drive)	Northern terminus
1.000 mi = 1.609 km; 1.000 km = 0.621 mi
