= List of middle schools in Kentucky =

This is a list of middle schools in the state of Kentucky.

If necessary, the schools are split into public and private, and also by district. Note that Kentucky has two types of public school districts: county districts, styled "XXXX County (Public) Schools" or in some cases "XXXX County School District"; and independent districts, which have varying styles with the common element of not including the word "County". Unless specified, public schools are affiliated with their associated county district.

== Adair County ==
- Adair County Schools
  - Adair County Middle School, Columbia

== Allen County ==
- Allen County Schools
  - James E. Bazzell Middle School, Scottsville

== Anderson County ==
- Anderson County Schools
  - Anderson County Middle School, Lawrenceburg
- Private
  - Christian Academy of Lawrenceburg, Lawrenceburg

== Ballard County ==
- Ballard County Schools
  - Ballard County Middle School, Barlow

== Barren County ==
- Barren County Schools
  - Barren County Middle School, Glasgow
- Glasgow Independent Schools
  - Glasgow Middle School, Glasgow
- Private
  - Glasgow Christian Academy, Glasgow

== Bath County ==
- Bath County Schools
  - Bath County Middle School, Owingsville

== Bell County ==
- Bell County Schools
  - Bell Central School Center, Pineville
  - Frakes School Center, Frakes
  - Lone Jack School Center, Fourmile
  - Page School Center, Pineville
  - Right Fork School Center, Kettle Island
  - Yellow Creek School Center, Middlesboro
- Middlesboro Independent Schools
  - Middlesboro Middle School, Middlesboro
- Pineville Independent Schools
  - Pineville Middle School, Pineville

== Boone County ==
- Boone County Schools
  - Ballyshannon Middle School, Union
  - Camp Ernst Middle School, Burlington
  - Conner Middle School, Hebron
  - Gray Middle School, Union
  - Ockerman Middle School, Florence
  - R. A. Jones Middle School, Florence
- Walton-Verona Independent Schools
  - Walton-Verona Middle School, Walton
- Private
  - Heritage Academy, Florence

== Bourbon County ==
- Bourbon County Schools
  - Bourbon County Middle School, Paris
- Paris Independent Schools
  - Paris Middle School, Paris
- Private
  - Bourbon Christian Academy, Paris

== Boyd County ==
- Ashland Independent Schools
  - George M. Verity Middle School, Ashland
- Boyd County Public Schools
  - Boyd County Middle School, Ashland
- Fairview Independent Schools
  - Fairview High School (6th-12th), Westwood
- Private
  - Rose Hill Christian School, Ashland

== Boyle County ==
- Boyle County Schools
  - Boyle County Middle School, Danville
- Danville Independent Schools
  - John W. Bate Middle School, Danville
- Private
  - Danville Christian Academy, Danville
- State-operated
  - Kentucky School for the Deaf, Danville

== Bracken County ==
- Augusta Independent Schools
  - Augusta Junior High School, Augusta
- Bracken County Schools
  - Bracken County Middle School, Brooksville
- Private
  - Saint Augustine School, Augusta

== Breathitt County ==
- Breathitt County Schools
  - Eugene Sebastian Middle School, Jackson
- Jackson Independent Schools
  - Jackson City School (Pre-k-12th), Jackson

== Breckinridge County ==
- Breckinridge County Schools
  - Breckinridge County Middle School, Harned

== Bullitt County ==
- Bullitt County Public Schools
  - Bernheim Middle School, Shepherdsville
  - Bullitt Lick Middle School, Shepherdsville
  - Eastside Middle School, Mount Washington
  - Hebron Middle School, Shepherdsville
  - Mount Washington Middle School, Mount Washington
  - Zoneton Middle School, Shepherdsville

== Butler County ==
- Butler County Schools
  - Butler County Middle School, Morgantown

== Caldwell County ==
- Caldwell County Schools
  - Caldwell County Middle School, Princeton

== Calloway County ==
- Calloway County Schools, Murray
  - Calloway County Middle School
- Murray Independent Schools
  - Murray Middle School, Murray

== Campbell County ==
- Campbell County Schools
  - Campbell County Middle School, Alexandria

== Carlisle County ==
- Carlisle County Public Schools
  - Carlisle County Middle School, Bardwell

== Carroll County ==
- Carroll County Schools
  - Carroll County Middle School, Carrollton

== Carter County ==
- Carter County Schools
  - East Carter Middle School, Grayson
  - West Carter Middle School, Olive Hill

== Casey County ==
- Casey County Schools
  - Casey County Middle School, Liberty

== Christian County ==
- Christian County Public Schools
  - Christian County Middle School, Hopkinsville
  - Hopkinsville Middle School, Hopkinsville
  - North Drive Middle School, Hopkinsville

== Clark County ==
- Clark County Public Schools
  - Clark Middle School, Winchester
  - Conkwright Middle School, Winchester

== Clay County ==
- Clay County Public Schools
  - Clay County Middle School, Manchester

== Clinton County ==
- Clinton County Schools
  - Clinton County Middle School, Albany

== Crittenden County ==
- Crittenden County Schools
  - Crittenden County Middle School, Marion

== Cumberland County ==
- Cumberland County Schools
  - Cumberland County Middle School, Burkesville

== Daviess County ==
- Daviess County Public Schools
  - College View Middle School, Owensboro
  - Daviess County Middle School Owensboro
  - F.T. Burns Middle School, Owensboro
- Owensboro Public Schools
  - Owensboro Middle School, Owensboro

== Edmonson County ==
- Edmonson County Schools
  - Edmonson County Middle School, Brownsville

== Elliott County ==
- Elliott County Schools
  - Elliott County High School (7th-12th), Sandy Hook

== Estill County ==
- Estill County Schools
  - Estill County Middle School, Irvine

== Fayette County ==
- Fayette County Public Schools
  - Beaumont Middle School, Lexington
  - Bryan Station Middle School, Lexington
  - Crawford Middle School, Lexington
  - E.J. Hayes Middle School, Lexington
  - Jessie Clark Middle School, Lexington
  - Leestown Middle School, Lexington
  - Lexington Traditional Middle School, Lexington
  - Morton Middle School, Lexington
  - Tates Creek Middle School, Lexington
  - Winburn Middle School, Lexington
  - Southern Middle School, Lexington

== Fleming County ==
- Fleming County Schools
  - Simons Middle School, Flemingsburg

== Floyd County ==
- Floyd County Schools
  - Allen Central Middle School, Eastern
  - James D. Adams Middle School, Prestonsburg
  - Betsy Layne Middle School, Betsy Layne, Kentucky
  - South Floyd Middle School, Hi Hat

== Franklin County ==
- Frankfort Independent Schools
  - Second Street Elementary School (Pre-k-8th), Frankfort
  - Wilkinson Street School (6th-12th), Frankfort
- Franklin County Public Schools
  - Bondurant Middle School, Frankfort
  - Elkhorn Middle School, Frankfort

== Fulton County ==
- Fulton County Schools
  - Fulton County Middle School, Hickman
- Fulton Independent Schools
  - Fulton City High School (7th-12th), Fulton

== Gallatin County ==
- Gallatin County Schools
  - Gallatin County Middle School, Warsaw

== Garrard County ==
- Garrard County Schools
  - Garrard Middle School, Lancaster

== Grant County ==
- Grant County Schools
  - Grant County Middle School, Dry Ridge
- Williamstown Independent Schools
  - Williamstown High School (6th-12th), Williamstown

== Graves County ==
- Graves County Schools
  - Graves County Middle School, Mayfield
- Mayfield Independent Schools
  - Mayfield Middle School, Mayfield

== Grayson County ==
- Grayson County Schools
  - Grayson County Middle School, Leitchfield

== Green County ==
- Green County Schools
  - Green County Middle School, Greensburg

== Greenup County ==
- Greenup County Schools
  - McKell Middle School, South Shore
  - Wurtland Middle School, Wurtland
- Raceland-Worthington Independent Schools
  - Raceland-Worthington High School (7th-12th), Raceland
- Russell Independent Schools
  - Russell Middle School, Russell

== Hancock County ==
- Hancock County Schools
  - Hancock County Middle School, Lewisport

== Hardin County ==
- Elizabethtown Independent Schools
  - Talton K. Stone Middle School, Elizabethtown
- Hardin County Schools
  - Bluegrass Middle School, Elizabethtown
  - East Hardin Middle School, Glendale
  - James T. Alton Middle School, Vine Grove
  - North Middle School, Radcliff
  - West Hardin Middle School, Cecilia
- West Point Independent Schools
  - West Point Elementary School (Pre-k-8th), West Point

== Harlan County ==
- Harlan County Public Schools
  - Black Mountain Elementary School (Pre-k-12th), Kenvir
  - Cumberland High School (7th-12th), Cumberland
  - Cawood Elementary School (K-8th), Cawood
  - Evarts Elementary School (K-8th), Evarts
  - Green Hills Elementary (Pre-k-8th), Bledsoe
  - Hall Elementary School (Pre-k-8th), Grays Knob
  - Rosspoint Elementary School (K-8th), Baxter
  - Wallins Elementary School (Pre-k-8th), Wallins
- Harlan Independent Schools
  - Harlan High School (5th-12th), Harlan

== Harrison County ==
- Harrison County Schools
  - Harrison County Middle School, Cynthiana

== Hart County ==
- Caverna Independent Schools
  - Caverna Middle School, Horse Cave
- Hart County Schools
  - Hart County High School (8th-12th), Munfordville

== Henderson County ==
- Henderson County Schools
  - Henderson County North Middle School, Henderson
  - Henderson County South Middle School, Henderson

== Henry County ==
- Eminence Independent Schools
  - Eminence High School (5th-12th), Eminence
- Henry County Schools
  - Henry County Middle School, New Castle

== Hickman County ==
- Hickman County Schools
  - Hickman County High School (7th-12th), Clinton

== Hopkins County ==
- Dawson Springs Independent Schools
  - Dawson Springs Middle School, Dawson Springs

== Jackson County ==
- Jackson County Public Schools
  - Jackson County Middle School, Mckee

== Jefferson County ==
- Anchorage Independent Schools
  - Anchorage Public Elementary School (K-8th), Anchorage
- Jefferson County Public Schools
  - Barret Traditional Middle School, Louisville
  - Brown School, Louisville
  - Carrithers Middle School, Louisville
  - Conway Middle School, Louisville
  - Crosby Middle School, Louisville
  - Farnsley Middle School, Louisville
  - Frederick Law Olmsted Academy North, Louisville
  - Frederick Law Olmsted Academy South, Louisville
  - Highland Middle School, Louisville
  - Jefferson County Traditional Middle School, Louisville
  - Johnson Traditional Middle School, Louisville
  - Kammerer Middle School, Louisville
  - Kennedy Metro Middle School, Louisville
  - Knight Middle School, Louisville
  - Lassiter Middle School, Louisville
  - Meyzeek Middle School, Louisville
  - Moore Traditional, Louisville
  - Myers Middle School, Louisville
  - Newburg Middle School, Louisville
  - Noe Middle School, Louisville
  - Ramsey Middle School, Louisville
  - Robert Frost Sixth Grade Academy, Louisville
  - Stuart Middle School, Louisville
  - The Academy @ Shawnee, Louisville
  - Thomas Jefferson Middle School, Louisville
  - Valley Preparatory Academy, Louisville
  - Western Middle School, Louisville
  - Westport Middle School, Louisville
- State-operated
  - Kentucky School for the Blind, Louisville

== Jessamine County ==
- Jessamine County Schools
  - East Jessamine County Middle School, Nicholasville
  - West Jessamine Middle School, Nicholasville

== Johnson County ==
- Johnson County Schools
  - Johnson County Middle School, Paintsville
- Paintsville Independent Schools
  - Paintsville High School (7th-12th), Paintsville

== Kenton County ==
- Beechwood Independent Schools
  - Beechwood High School (7th-12th), Fort Mitchell
- Covington Independent Public Schools
  - Holmes Junior High School, Covington
  - Two Rivers Middle School, Covington
- Erlanger-Elsmere Independent Schools
  - Tichenor Middle School, Erlanger
- Kenton County Schools
  - Summit View Middle School, Independence
  - Turkey Foot Middle School, Edgewood
  - Twenhofel Middle School, Independence
  - Woodland Middle School, Taylor Mill
- Ludlow Independent Schools
  - Ludlow Middle School, Ludlow

== Knott County ==
- Knott County Schools
  - Beaver Creek Elementary School (K-8th), Topmost
  - Beckham Combs Elementary School (K-8th), Vest
  - Caney Creek Elementary School (K-8th), Pippa Passes
  - Carr Creek Elementary School (K-8th), Littcarr
  - Emmalena Elementary School (Pre-k-8th), Emmalena
  - Hindman Elementary School (Pre-k-8th), Hindman
  - Jones Fork Elementary School (Pre-k-8th), Mousie

== Knox County ==
- Barbourville Independent Schools
  - Barbourville High School (7th-12th), Barbourville
- Knox County Public Schools
  - Artemus Middle School (Pre-k-8th), Artemus
  - Boone Elementary School (K-8th), Barbourville
  - Dewitt Elementary School (K-8th), Dewitt
  - Flat Lick Elementary School (K-8th), Flat Lick
  - Girdler Elementary School (K-8th), Girdler
  - Hampton Elementary School (Pre-k-8th), Barbourville
  - Jesse D. Lay Elementary School (Pre-k-8th), Barbourville

== LaRue County ==
- LaRue County Schools
  - LaRue County Middle School, Hodgenville

== Laurel County ==
- East Bernstadt Independent Schools
  - East Bernstadt Elementary School (Pre-k-8th), East Bernstadt
- Laurel County Schools
  - North Laurel Middle School, London
  - South Laurel Middle School, London

== Lawrence County ==
- Lawrence County Schools
  - Blaine Elementary School (Pre-k-8th), Blaine
  - Fallsburg Elementary School (Pre-k-8th), Fallsburg
  - Louisa Middle School, Louisa

== Lee County ==
- Lee County Schools
  - Lee County Middle School, Beattyville

== Leslie County ==
- Leslie County Schools
  - Leslie County Middle School, Hyden

== Letcher County ==
- Jenkins Independent Schools
  - Jenkins Middle School, Jenkins
- Letcher County Schools
  - Arlie Boggs Elementary School (Pre-k-8th), Eolia
  - Cowan Elementary School (K-8th), Whitesburg
  - Fleming-Neon Elementary (K-8th), Fleming-Neon
  - Letcher Elementary School (K-8th), Letcher
  - Martha Jane Potter Elementary School (K-8th), Kona
  - Whitesburg Middle School, Whitesburg

== Lewis County ==
- Lewis County Schools
  - Lewis County Middle School, Vanceburg

== Lincoln County ==
- Lincoln County Schools
  - Lincoln County Middle School, Stanford

== Livingston County ==
- Livingston County Schools
  - Livingston County Middle School, Burna

== Logan County ==
- Logan County Schools
  - Adairville Elementary School (Pre-k-8th), Adairville
  - Auburn Elementary School (Pre-k-8th), Auburn
  - Chandlers Elementary School (Pre-k-8th), Russellville
  - Lewisburg Elementary School (Pre-k-8th), Lewisburg
  - Olmstead Elementary School (Pre-k-8th), Olmstead
- Russellville Independent Schools
  - Russellville Middle School, Russellville

== Lyon County ==
- Lyon County Schools
  - Lyon County Middle School, Eddyville

== Madison County ==
- Berea Independent Schools
  - Berea Community Middle School, Berea
- Madison County Schools
  - Clark Moore Middle School, Richmond
  - Foley Middle School, Berea
  - Madison Middle School, Richmond
  - Model Laboratory Middle School, Richmond

== Magoffin County ==
- Magoffin County Schools
  - Herald Whitaker Middle School, Salyersville

== Marion County ==
- Marion County Schools
  - Lebanon Middle School, Lebanon
  - Saint Charles Middle School, Lebanon
  - Saint Augustine Middle School, Lebanon, Kentucky

== Marshall County ==
- Marshall County Schools
  - Benton Middle School, Benton
  - North Marshall Middle School, Calvert County
  - South Marshall Middle School, Benton

== Martin County ==
- Martin County Schools
  - Inez Middle School, Inez
  - Warfield Middle School, Warfield

== Mason County ==
- Mason County Schools
  - Mason County Middle School, Maysville

== McCracken County ==
- McCracken County Public Schools
  - Heath Middle School, West Paducah
  - Lone Oak Middle School, Paducah
  - Reidland Middle School, Paducah
- Paducah Independent Schools
  - Paducah Middle School, Paducah

== McCreary County ==
- McCreary County Schools
  - Pine Knot Middle School, Pine Knot
  - Whitley City Middle School, Whitley City

== McLean County ==
- McLean County Schools
  - McLean County Middle School, Calhoun

== Meade County ==
- Meade County Schools
  - Stuart Pepper Middle School, Brandenburg

== Menifee County ==
- Menifee County Middle School, Frenchburg

== Mercer County ==
- Burgin Independent Schools
  - Burgin High School (6th-12th), Burgin
- Harrodsburg Independent Schools
  - Harrodsburg Middle School, Harrodsburg
- Mercer County Schools
  - Kenneth D. King Middle School, Harrodsburg

== Metcalfe County ==
- Metcalfe County Schools
  - Metcalfe County Middle School, Edmonton

== Monroe County ==
- Monroe County Schools
  - Monroe County Middle School, Tompkinsville

== Montgomery County ==
- Montgomery County Schools
  - McNabb Middle School, Mount Sterling

== Morgan County ==
- Morgan County Schools
  - Morgan County Middle School, West Liberty

== Muhlenberg County ==
- Muhlenberg County Schools
  - Muhlenberg North Middle School, Powderly
  - Muhlenberg South Middle School, Greenville

== Nelson County ==
- Bardstown Independent Schools
  - Bardstown Middle School, Bardstown
- Nelson County Schools
  - Bloomfield Middle School, Bloomfield
  - Old Kentucky Home Middle School, Bardstown

== Nicholas County ==
- Nicholas County Schools
  - Nicholas County Elementary School (K-8th), Carlisle

== Ohio County ==
- Ohio County Schools
  - Ohio County Middle School, Hartford

== Oldham County ==
- Oldham County Schools
  - East Oldham Middle School, Crestwood
  - North Oldham Middle School, Goshen
  - Oldham County Middle School, Buckner
  - South Oldham Middle School, Crestwood
- Private
  - St. Aloysius School, Pewee Valley

== Owen County ==
- Owen County Schools
  - Bowling Middle School, Owenton

== Owsley County ==
- Owsley County Schools
  - Owsley County High School (7th-12th), Booneville

== Pendleton County ==
- Pendleton County Schools
  - Phillip A. Sharp Middle School, Butler

== Perry County ==
- Hazard Independent Schools
  - Roy G. Eversole Middle School, Hazard
- Perry County Schools
  - A.B. Combs Elementary School (K-8th), Combs
  - Big Creek Elementary School (Pre-k-8th), Avawam
  - Buckhorn Elementary School (K-8th), Buckhorn
  - Chavies Elementary School (K-8th), Chavies
  - Leatherwood Elementary School (K-8th), Leatherwood
  - Lost Creek Elementary School (Pre-k-8th), Dice
  - Robert W. Combs Elementary School (Pre-k-8th), Happy
  - Robinson Elementary School (Pre-k-8th), Ary
  - Viper Elementary School (Pre-k-8th), Viper
  - Willard Elementary School (K-8th), Busy

== Pike County ==
- Pike County Schools
  - Belfry Middle School, Belfry
  - Johns Creek Elementary School (Pre-k-8th), Johns Creek
  - Millard Middle School, Millard
  - Turkey Creek Middle School, Turkey Creek
  - Virgie Middle School, Virgie
- Pikeville Independent Schools
  - Pikeville High School (7th-12th), Pikeville

== Powell County ==
- Powell County Schools
  - Powell County Middle School, Stanton

== Pulaski County ==
- Pulaski County Schools
  - Northern Middle School, Somerset
  - Southern Middle School, Somerset
- Science Hill Independent Schools
  - Science Hill Elementary School (Pre-k-8th), Science Hill
- Somerset Independent Schools
  - Meece Middle School, Somerset

== Robertson County ==
- Robertson County Schools
  - Deming High School (7th-12th), Mount Olivet

== Rockcastle County ==
- Rockcastle County Schools
  - Rockcastle County Middle School, Mount Vernon

== Rowan County ==
- Rowan County Schools
  - Rowan County Middle School, Morehead

== Russell County ==
- Russell County Schools
  - Russell County Middle School, Russell Springs

== Scott County ==
- Scott County Schools
  - Georgetown Middle School, Georgetown
  - Scott County Middle School, Georgetown
  - Royal Spring Middle School, Georgetown, Kentucky

== Shelby County ==
- Shelby County Public Schools
  - Shelby County East Middle School, Shelbyville
  - Shelby County West Middle School, Shelbyville
- Private
  - Cornerstone Christian Academy, Shelbyville
  - Our Lady of Guadalupe Academy, Simpsonville

== Simpson County ==
- Simpson County Schools
  - Franklin-Simpson Middle School, Franklin

== Spencer County ==
- Spencer County Schools
  - Spencer County Middle School, Taylorsville

== Taylor County ==
- Campbellsville Independent Schools
  - Campbellsville Middle School, Campbellsville
- Taylor County Schools
  - Taylor County Middle School, Campbellsville

== Todd County ==
- Todd County Schools
  - Todd County Middle School, Elkton

== Trigg County ==
- Trigg County Public Schools
  - Trigg County Middle School, Cadiz

== Trimble County ==
- Trimble County Schools
  - Trimble County Middle School, Bedford

== Union County ==
- Union County Public Schools
  - Union County Middle School, Morganfield

== Warren County ==
- Bowling Green Independent Schools
  - Bowling Green Middle School, Bowling Green
- Warren County Schools
  - Drakes Creek Middle School, Bowling Green
  - Henry F. Moss Middle School, Bowling Green
  - Warren East Middle School, Bowling Green

== Washington County ==
- Washington County Schools
  - Washington County Middle School, Springfield

== Wayne County ==
- Monticello Independent Schools
  - Monticello Middle School, Monticello
- Wayne County Schools
  - A.J. Lloyd Middle School, Monticello
  - Wayne County Alternative Middle School, Monticello

== Webster County ==
- Providence Independent Schools
  - Broadway Elementary School (Pre-k-8th), Providence
- Webster County Schools
  - Clay Elementary School (Pre-k-8th), Clay
  - Dixon Elementary School (Pre-k-8th), Dixon
  - Sebree Elementary School (Pre-k-8th), Sebree
  - Slaughters Elementary School (Pre-k-8th), Slaughters

== Whitley County ==
- Corbin Independent Schools
  - Corbin Middle School, Corbin
- Whitley County Schools
  - Whitley County Middle School, Williamsburg
- Williamsburg Independent Schools
  - Williamsburg City School (Pre-k-12th), Williamsburg

== Wolfe County ==
- Wolfe County Schools
  - Wolfe County Middle School, Campton

== Woodford County ==
- Woodford County Schools
  - Woodford County Middle School, Versailles

== See also ==
- List of high schools in Kentucky
- List of school districts in Kentucky
