= Kentucky Route 267 =

State highway in Kentucky, United States

Kentucky Route 267
- KY 267 highlighted in red

Route information
- Maintained by KYTC
- Length: 12.3 mi (19.8 km)

Major junctions
- South end: Typo Road and Typo Tunnel Lane in Typo
- KY 15 near Bonnyman
- North end: KY 476 near Dice

Location
- Country: United States
- State: Kentucky
- Counties: Perry

Highway system
- Kentucky State Highway System; Interstate; US; State; Parkways
| ← KY 266 | → KY 268 |

Kentucky Route 267 (KY 267) is a 12.3-mile-long (19.8 km) state highway in the U.S. state of Kentucky. The highway travels through mostly rural areas of Perry County.

== Route description ==
KY 267 begins at an intersection with Typo Tunnel Lane in Typo, within Perry County, where the roadway continues as Typo Road. It travels to the east-northeast and crosses over First Creek twice. It parallels the creek and curves to the north-northwest and crosses over the creek again. The highway curves to the northeast and crosses the creek again. It curves to the north-northeast and travels through Bonnyman. Then, it curves to the east-southeast and northeast before it intersects KY 15. It travels in a north-northeast direction, crosses over the creek again, and passes Kaikumba Field. Then, KY 267 heads to the northeast. It winds its way to the north. After it curves to the north-northwest, it begins paralleling Sixteenmile Creek. It then crosses over Hiram Fork. In Dice, the highway begins paralleling Lost Creek and intersects the eastern terminus of KY 2446 (Lost Creek Road). It heads to the northeast and curves to the east-southeast before it intersects the northern terminus of KY 1146, where it stops paralleling the creek. The highway heads to the northeast and curves to the north-northwest, where it begins paralleling Rowdy Branch. It curves to the east-northeast and meets its northern terminus, an intersection with KY 476.

== History ==
KY 267 was formed by 1945.

The original KY 267 ran from KY 105 (now KY 79) south to what is now KY 1038; this became part of KY 103 when it was extended north from Auburn by 1939.

== Major intersections ==
The entire route is in Perry County.

| Location | mi | km | Destinations | Notes |
|---|---|---|---|---|
| Typo | 0.0 | 0.0 | Typo Tunnel Lane / Typo Road south | Southern terminus |
| | 2.0 | 3.2 | KY 15 – Hazard, Jackson | |
| Dice | 8.8 | 14.2 | KY 2446 west (Lost Creek Road) | Eastern terminus of KY 2446 |
| | 9.3 | 15.0 | KY 1146 south | Northern terminus of KY 1146 |
| | 12.3 | 19.8 | KY 476 | Northern terminus |
1.000 mi = 1.609 km; 1.000 km = 0.621 mi
