= National Register of Historic Places listings in Perry County, Kentucky =

Location of Perry County in Kentucky

This is a list of the National Register of Historic Places listings in Perry County, Kentucky.

It is intended to be a complete list of the properties on the National Register of Historic Places in Perry County, Kentucky, United States. The locations of National Register properties for which the latitude and longitude coordinates are included below, may be seen in a map.

There are 3 properties listed on the National Register in the county.

This National Park Service list is complete through NPS recent listings posted March 21, 2025.

== Current listings ==
	Name on the Register	Image	Date listed	Location	City or town	Description
1	Buckhorn Presbyterian Church and the Greer Gymnasium	Buckhorn Presbyterian Church and the Greer Gymnasium	June 27, 1975 (#75000818)	Off Kentucky Route 28; 37°20′52″N 83°28′33″W	Buckhorn	
2	Memorial Gym		January 10, 2024 (#100009729)	491 L.O. Davis Drive; 37°14′58″N 83°11′25″W	Hazard	
3	Ritchie Family Home Place		April 18, 2024 (#100010243)	88 Slabtown Hollow; 37°11′27″N 83°09′04″W	Viper	

== See also ==
- List of National Historic Landmarks in Kentucky
- National Register of Historic Places listings in Kentucky
