= Buckhorn Lake (Kentucky) =

Lake in Kentucky, United States

- Location within Kentucky
- Location: Perry / Leslie counties, Kentucky, United States
- Coordinates: 37°20′22″N 83°28′15″W
- Type: reservoir
- Primary inflows: Kentucky River
- Primary outflows: Kentucky River
- Basin countries: United States
- Surface area: 1,230 acres (5 km^{2})
- Max. depth: 50 ft (15 m)
- Water volume: 32,100 acre⋅ft (0.0396 km^{3})
- Surface elevation: 761 ft (232 m)

Buckhorn Lake, located south of Buckhorn, Kentucky, United States and northwest of Hazard, Kentucky off Kentucky Route 28, is a 1,230-acre (5 km^{2}) reservoir created by the United States Army Corps of Engineers in 1967 by impounding the Middle Fork of the Kentucky River. The lake was flooded over top of a small township called Bowlingtown.

Buckhorn Lake is an impoundment of the Middle Fork of the Kentucky River. Buckhorn Dam is an earthen dam, 160 feet (49 m) high and 1,020 feet (310 m) in length at its crest, with a maximum capacity of 167,900 acre-feet (207,100,000 m^{3}) and normal storage of 32,100 acre-feet (39,600,000 m^{3}). The origin of the lake's name is uncertain. Some claim the name is taken from the discovery of a buck's horn at a nearby salt lick. Others claim that it is named for a buck killed by Jerry Smith, the area's first settler.

Buckhorn Lake is home to a sizable population of muskie, making it an attractive destination for fishermen.

== Climate ==
The climate in this area is characterized by hot, humid summers and generally mild to cool winters. According to the Köppen Climate Classification system, Buckhorn Lake has a humid subtropical climate, abbreviated "Cfa" on climate maps.

== History ==
Construction of the dam began in 1956, just upstream of a very small village known as Bowlingtown. The residents of Bowlingtown were forced to move from their homes and given very little compensation for the land that was bought out by the Army Corps of Engineers. The most any family received was ten cents per acre of property, with no value being added for buildings, businesses or farms. Citizens of Bowlingtown were not happy with the project, but ultimately had no voice in the matter. Despite their best efforts the lake was created anyway. Among the citizens there was significant controversy surrounding the project, none more so than the family cemeteries that were forcibly dug up and moved without notifying the families of the deceased. Most families did not know their loved ones had been moved until years later. The individual cemeteries were combined into one that is nearly inaccessible for half the year.

== Attractions ==
Buckhorn Lake is home to Buckhorn Lake state park. The state lodge has the Bowlingtown History Museum, Bowlingtown Country Kitchen, swimming pool, and miniature golf course.

An island in the middle of the lake has a cemetery where former residents of Bowlingtown are still laid to rest.

== See also ==
- Buckhorn Lake State Resort Park
