= Tilford (disambiguation) =

Tilford can refer to:

== Geography ==
- Tilford, a small village in Surrey, England
- Tilford, Kentucky, a town in Kentucky
- Tilford, South Dakota, a town in the Piedmont Valley, South Dakota

== People ==
- Arthur Tilford (1903–1993), English footballer
- Henry Morgan Tilford (1856–1919), American businessman
- Shelby G. Tilford (1937–2022), American scientist
- Terrell Tilford (born 1969), American actor

== Others ==
- HMS Tilford, a Ford-class seaward defence boat built for the British Royal Navy
