= Kentucky Route 476 =

State highway in Kentucky, United States

Kentucky Route 476
- KY 476 highlighted in red

Route information
- Maintained by KYTC
- Length: 33.721 mi (54.269 km)

Major junctions
- West end: KY 15 Bus. in Hazard
- East end: KY 15 at Lost Creek

Location
- Country: United States
- State: Kentucky
- Counties: Perry, Breathitt

Highway system
- Kentucky State Highway System; Interstate; US; State; Parkways
← KY 475	→ KY 477

Kentucky Route 476 (KY 476) is a 33.721-mile-long (54.269 km) state highway in Kentucky that runs from Kentucky Route 15 Business in northern Hazard to Kentucky Route 15 at Lost Creek via Darfork, Dwarf, Hardshell, and Clayhole.

== Major intersections ==
County	Location	mi	km	Destinations	Notes
Perry	Hazard	0.000	0.000	KY 15 Bus. (North Main Street)	Southern terminus
Perry		1.905	3.066	KY 550 west (Combs Road) / KY 1440 south (Upper 2nd Creek Road)	South end of KY 550 overlap; northern terminus of KY 1440
Perry		2.863	4.608	KY 1088 east	Western terminus of KY 1088
Perry		3.851	6.198	KY 1146 south (Hardburly Road)	South end of KY 1146 overlap
Perry		4.176	6.721	KY 1146 north	North end of KY 1146 overlap
Perry		7.625	12.271	KY 550 east	North end of KY 550 overlap
Perry		8.897	14.318	To KY 80	
Perry		11.533	18.561	KY 3351 south (Pigeonroost-Bulan Road)	Northern terminus of KY 3351
Perry		12.444	20.027	KY 1087 east	Western terminus of KY 1087
Perry		18.405	29.620	KY 267 south	Northern terminus of KY 267
Breathitt		30.088	48.422	KY 3324 north	Southern terminus of KY 3324
Breathitt	Lost Creek	33.721	54.269	KY 15	Northern terminus
1.000 mi = 1.609 km; 1.000 km = 0.621 mi: Concurrency terminus
