= Slemp =

Slemp may refer to:

== People ==
- Campbell Slemp (1839–1907), Confederate Army officer and American politician
- C. Bascom Slemp (1870–1943), American educator, politician and philanthropist, son of Campbell

== Other ==
- Slemp, Kentucky, an unincorporated community in Perry County
