= Doorway =

Doorway or The Doorway may refer to:

== Portals ==
- Door-shaped entrance
- Doorway page, a type of webpage
- Trapdoor, a door on a floor, ceiling, or roof

== Geography ==
- Doorway, Kentucky, a community in the United States

== Arts, entertainment, and media ==
=== Music ===
- Doorway, a 2007 album by Ron Block
- "Doorway", a song by Planningtorock from the album W (Planningtorock album)
- "The Doorway", a song by Neurosis from the album Times of Grace

=== Other arts, entertainment, and media ===
- The Doorway (film), a 2000 Roger Corman film
- "The Doorway" (Mad Men), the season six, 2-hour premiere episode of the television series Mad Men
- Doorways, a proposed science-fiction series by George R.R. Martin
