= Saul, Kentucky =

Unincorporated community in Kentucky, United States

Saul
- Unincorporated community
- Location within the state of Kentucky Saul (the United States)
- Coordinates: 37°16′21″N 83°29′44″W
- Country: United States
- State: Kentucky
- County: Perry
- Elevation: 1,027 ft (313 m)
- Time zone: UTC-5 (Eastern (EST))
  - Summer (DST): UTC-4 (EDT)
- ZIP codes: 40981
- GNIS feature ID: 515260

Saul is an unincorporated community located in Perry County, Kentucky, United States.
