= Scuddy, Kentucky =

Unincorporated community in Kentucky, United States

Scuddy
- Unincorporated community
- Location within the state of Kentucky Scuddy (the United States)
- Coordinates: 37°12′13″N 83°5′1″W
- Country: United States
- State: Kentucky
- County: Perry
- Elevation: 951 ft (290 m)
- Time zone: UTC-6 (Central (CST))
  - Summer (DST): UTC-5 (CST)
- ZIP codes: 41760
- GNIS feature ID: 503124

Scuddy is an unincorporated community and coal town in Perry County, Kentucky, United States. Their Post Office closed in 2004.
