= Middle Fork, Kentucky =

Unincorporated community in Kentucky, United States

Middle Fork
- Unincorporated community
- Location within the state of Kentucky Middle Fork (the United States)
- Coordinates: 37°8′59″N 83°9′25″W
- Country: United States
- State: Kentucky
- County: Perry
- Elevation: 1,047 ft (319 m)
- Time zone: UTC-5 (Eastern (EST))
  - Summer (DST): UTC-4 (EDT)
- GNIS feature ID: 2556935

Middle Fork is an unincorporated community located in Perry County, Kentucky, United States.
