= Blue Diamond, Kentucky =

Unincorporated community in Kentucky, United States

Blue Diamond
- Unincorporated community
- Location within the state of Kentucky Blue Diamond (the United States)
- Coordinates: 37°18′28″N 83°12′57″W
- Country: United States
- State: Kentucky
- County: Perry
- Elevation: 1,007 ft (307 m)
- Time zone: UTC-5 (Eastern (EST))
  - Summer (DST): UTC-4 (EDT)
- GNIS feature ID: 507530

Blue Diamond is an unincorporated community located in Perry County, Kentucky, United States.

The town's population was approximately 2,000 during the 1930s. It was a coal town associated with the operation of the Blue Diamond Coal Company mine.
