= Boat, Kentucky =

Unincorporated community in Kentucky, United States

Boat
- Unincorporated community
- Location within the state of Kentucky Boat (the United States)
- Coordinates: 37°21′8″N 83°21′8″W
- Country: United States
- State: Kentucky
- County: Perry
- Elevation: 797 ft (243 m)
- Time zone: UTC-5 (Eastern (EST))
  - Summer (DST): UTC-4 (EDT)
- GNIS feature ID: 510820

Boat is an unincorporated community located in Perry County, Kentucky, United States. The Boat post office is closed in late 1931.
