= Happy Valley, Kentucky =

Unincorporated community in Kentucky, United States

Happy Valley
- Unincorporated community
- Location within the state of Kentucky Happy Valley (the United States)
- Coordinates: 37°17′27″N 83°13′39″W
- Country: United States
- State: Kentucky
- County: Perry
- Elevation: 906 ft (276 m)
- Time zone: UTC-5 (Eastern (EST))
  - Summer (DST): UTC-4 (EDT)
- GNIS feature ID: 2557251

Happy Valley was an unincorporated community located in Perry County, Kentucky, United States. It was centered around a coal camp established in 1918.
