= Beehive, Kentucky =

Unincorporated community in Kentucky, United States

Beehive
- Unincorporated community
- Location within the state of Kentucky Beehive (the United States)
- Coordinates: 37°4′50″N 83°6′28″W
- Country: United States
- State: Kentucky
- County: Perry
- Elevation: 1,037 ft (316 m)
- Time zone: UTC-5 (Eastern (EST))
  - Summer (DST): UTC-4 (EDT)
- GNIS feature ID: 2556908

Beehive is an unincorporated community within Perry County, Kentucky, United States.
