= Olivers, Kentucky =

Unincorporated community in Kentucky, United States

Olivers
- Unincorporated community
- Location within the state of Kentucky Olivers (the United States)
- Coordinates: 37°17′34″N 83°17′56″W
- Country: United States
- State: Kentucky
- County: Perry
- Elevation: 830 ft (250 m)
- Time zone: UTC-5 (Eastern (EST))
  - Summer (DST): UTC-4 (EDT)
- GNIS feature ID: 2557254

Olivers is an unincorporated community located in Perry County, Kentucky, United States.
