= Clemons, Kentucky =

Unincorporated community in Kentucky, United States

Clemons
- Unincorporated community
- Location within the state of Kentucky Clemons (the United States)
- Coordinates: 37°17′45″N 83°13′57″W
- Country: United States
- State: Kentucky
- County: Perry
- Elevation: 942 ft (287 m)
- Time zone: UTC-6 (Central (CST))
  - Summer (DST): UTC-5 (CST)
- GNIS feature ID: 507713

Clemons is an unincorporated community and coal town in Perry County, Kentucky, United States. Their post office has been closed. Sgt. Woodrow W. Shepherd who was killed in action at the Battle of Iwo Jima is buried in the Shepherd Family Cemetery nearby.
