= Dow, Kentucky =

Unincorporated community in Kentucky, United States

Dow
- Unincorporated community
- Location within the state of Kentucky Dow (the United States)
- Coordinates: 37°9′25″N 83°9′47″W
- Country: United States
- State: Kentucky
- County: Perry
- Elevation: 1,024 ft (312 m)
- Time zone: UTC-5 (Eastern (EST))
  - Summer (DST): UTC-4 (EDT)
- ZIP codes: 41742
- GNIS feature ID: 511881

Dow is an unincorporated community located in Perry County, Kentucky, United States. Its post office is closed.
