= Allock, Kentucky =

Unincorporated community in Kentucky, United States

Allock
- Unincorporated community
- Location within the state of Kentucky Allock (the United States)
- Coordinates: 37°13′44″N 83°4′24″W
- Country: United States
- State: Kentucky
- County: Perry
- Elevation: 1,102 ft (336 m)
- Time zone: UTC-6 (Central (CST))
  - Summer (DST): UTC-5 (CST)
- ZIP Codes: 41710
- GNIS feature ID: 507388

Allock is an unincorporated community and coal town in Perry County, Kentucky, United States. Its post office closed in 1995.
