= Jones, Kentucky =

Unincorporated community in Kentucky, United States

Jones
- Unincorporated community
- Location within the state of Kentucky Jones (the United States)
- Coordinates: 37°21′49″N 83°13′48″W
- Country: United States
- State: Kentucky
- County: Perry
- Elevation: 942 ft (287 m)
- Time zone: UTC-5 (Eastern (EST))
  - Summer (DST): UTC-4 (EDT)
- GNIS feature ID: 2557378

Jones is an unincorporated community located in Perry County, Kentucky, United States.
