= Otter Creek, Kentucky =

Unincorporated community in Kentucky, United States

Otter Creek
- Unincorporated community
- Location within the state of Kentucky Otter Creek (the United States)
- Coordinates: 37°19′00″N 83°29′4″W
- Country: United States
- State: Kentucky
- County: Perry
- Elevation: 850 ft (260 m)
- Time zone: UTC-5 (Eastern (EST))
  - Summer (DST): UTC-4 (EDT)
- GNIS feature ID: 2557326

Otter Creek is an unincorporated community located in Perry County, Kentucky, United States.
