= Kentucky Route 82 =

State highway in Kentucky, United States

Kentucky Route 82
- KY 82 highlighted in red

Route information
- Maintained by KYTC
- Length: 7.1 mi (11.4 km)

Major junctions
- South end: KY 89 southwest of Clay City
- KY 1028 in Clay City
- North end: Mountain Parkway / KY 15 in Clay City

Location
- Country: United States
- State: Kentucky
- Counties: Estill, Powell

Highway system
- Kentucky State Highway System; Interstate; US; State; Parkways
← KY 81	→ KY 83

Kentucky Route 82 (KY 82) is a 7.1-mile-long (11.4 km) state highway in the U.S. state of Kentucky. The highway connects rural areas of Estill and Powell counties with Clay City.

== Route description ==
KY 82 begins at an intersection with KY 89 (Winchester Road) southwest of Clay City, within Estill County. It travels to the northeast and curves to the north-northeast. It passes Lorrison Cemetery before curving to the east-northeast and crosses Twin Creek. The highway heads to the northeast and crosses over Plum Branch, which marks the Powell County line. It crosses over the Red River before curving to the north. Upon entering Clay City, it intersects the eastern terminus of KY 1028 (Snow Creek Road). It curves to the northeast and meets its northern terminus, an interchange with Mountain Parkway and KY 15 (Main Street/Winchester Road).

== History ==
KY 82 was formed between 1930 and 1939.

An earlier KY 82 ran from US 23 in Pikeville to US 52 in Williamson; this became part of US 119.

== Major intersections ==
County	Location	mi	km	Destinations	Notes
Estill		0.0	0.0	KY 89 (Winchester Road) – Irvine, Winchester	Southern terminus
Powell	Clay City	6.9	11.1	KY 1028 west (Snow Creek Road)	Eastern terminus of KY 1028
Powell	Clay City	7.1	11.4	Mountain Parkway / KY 15 (Main Street/Winchester Road) – Campton	Northern terminus; Mountain Parkway exit 16
1.000 mi = 1.609 km; 1.000 km = 0.621 mi
