= Calloway County School District =

School district in Kentucky, United States

The Calloway County School District is located in Calloway County, Kentucky, United States and is the educational home to over 3,000 students. The district operates Calloway County Preschool, three elementary schools (Southwest Calloway Elementary, North Calloway Elementary, and East Calloway Elementary), Calloway County Middle School, and Calloway County High School. Calloway County students and teams are referred to as "Lakers."

Calloway County High School offers many elective courses and extra-curricular activities including Academic Team, FFA, FBLA, Technology Students of America, Drama Club, Choir, and Band. The Calloway Lady Lakers were state championships in Fast Pitch Softball in 2004 and Regional Champions in Boys Track & Field in 2009.

== Schools ==
- Calloway County High School- Enrollment: 906
- Calloway County Middle School-Enrollment: 739
- East Calloway Elementary- Enrollment: 313
- North Calloway Elementary- Enrollment: 617
- Southwest Calloway Elementary- Enrollment: 429
- Calloway County Preschool- Enrollment: 209
