= Defiance, Kentucky =

Unincorporated community in Kentucky, United States

Defiance
- Unincorporated community
- Location within the state of Kentucky Defiance (the United States)
- Coordinates: 37°12′12″N 83°5′31″W
- Country: United States
- State: Kentucky
- County: Perry
- Elevation: 955 ft (291 m)
- Time zone: UTC-5 (Eastern (EST))
  - Summer (DST): UTC-4 (EDT)
- GNIS feature ID: 507837

Defiance is an unincorporated community located in Perry County, Kentucky, United States.
