= Woodland Park, Kentucky =

Unincorporated community in Kentucky, United States

Woodland Park
- Unincorporated community
- Location within the state of Kentucky Woodland Park (the United States)
- Coordinates: 37°14′48″N 83°10′40″W
- Country: United States
- State: Kentucky
- County: Perry
- Elevation: 879 ft (268 m)
- Time zone: UTC-5 (Eastern (EST))
  - Summer (DST): UTC-4 (EDT)
- GNIS feature ID: 516471

Woodland Park is an unincorporated community located in Perry County, Kentucky, United States.
