= Fourseam, Kentucky =

Unincorporated community in Kentucky, United States

Fourseam
- Unincorporated community
- Location within the state of Kentucky Fourseam (the United States)
- Coordinates: 37°13′14″N 83°10′43″W
- Country: United States
- State: Kentucky
- County: Perry
- Elevation: 906 ft (276 m)
- Time zone: UTC-5 (Eastern (EST))
  - Summer (DST): UTC-4 (EDT)
- GNIS feature ID: 512228

Fourseam is an unincorporated community located in Perry County, Kentucky, United States.

The coal town was named by the Fourseam Coal Co. for the four coal seams exploited in the mine beginning shortly before World War I.
