= Farler, Kentucky =

Unincorporated community in Kentucky, United States

Farler
- Unincorporated community
- Location within the state of Kentucky Farler (the United States)
- Coordinates: 37°9′17″N 83°11′32″W
- Country: United States
- State: Kentucky
- County: Perry
- Elevation: 1,106 ft (337 m)
- Time zone: UTC-5 (Eastern (EST))
  - Summer (DST): UTC-4 (EDT)
- ZIP codes: 41742
- GNIS feature ID: 512133

Farler is an unincorporated community located in Perry County, Kentucky, United States.

The town was named for local storekeeper and postmaster William Farler. Its post office, opened in 1905, has closed.
