= Rowdy Branch =

Stream in Perry County, Kentucky

Coordinates: 37.3978719°N 83.2079516°W

Rowdy Branch is a stream located entirely within Perry County, Kentucky.

According to tradition, Rowdy Branch was so named on account of the "rowdy" settlers who lived near it.

== See also ==
- List of rivers of Kentucky
