= Gays Creek, Kentucky =

Unincorporated community in Kentucky, United States

- Unincorporated community
- Location within Kentucky
- Coordinates: 37°19′41″N 83°25′40″W
- Country: United States
- State: Kentucky
- County: Perry
- Elevation: 886 ft (270 m)
- Time zone: UTC-5 (Eastern (EST))
  - Summer (DST): UTC-4 (EDT)
- ZIP code: 41745
- Area code: 606
- GNIS feature ID: 512293

Gays Creek is an unincorporated community in Perry County, Kentucky, United States. Gays Creek is 14 miles (23 km) west-northwest of Hazard. Gays Creek has a post office, established in 1888, with ZIP code 41745.

The community was named for the local creek, Gays Creek, which was named in honor of Henry Gay, a local Revolutionary War veteran who died in 1830.
