= Wentz, Kentucky =

Unincorporated community in Kentucky, United States

Wentz
- Unincorporated community
- Location within the state of Kentucky Wentz (the United States)
- Coordinates: 37°4′54″N 83°3′50″W
- Country: United States
- State: Kentucky
- County: Perry
- Elevation: 1,165 ft (355 m)
- Time zone: UTC-5 (Eastern (EST))
  - Summer (DST): UTC-4 (EDT)
- GNIS feature ID: 516271

Wentz is an unincorporated community located in Perry County, Kentucky, United States. Its post office is closed.
