= Buckhorn Presbyterian Church and the Greer Gymnasium =

Historic church in Kentucky, United States

- Buckhorn Presbyterian Church and the Geer Gymnasium
- U.S. National Register of Historic Places
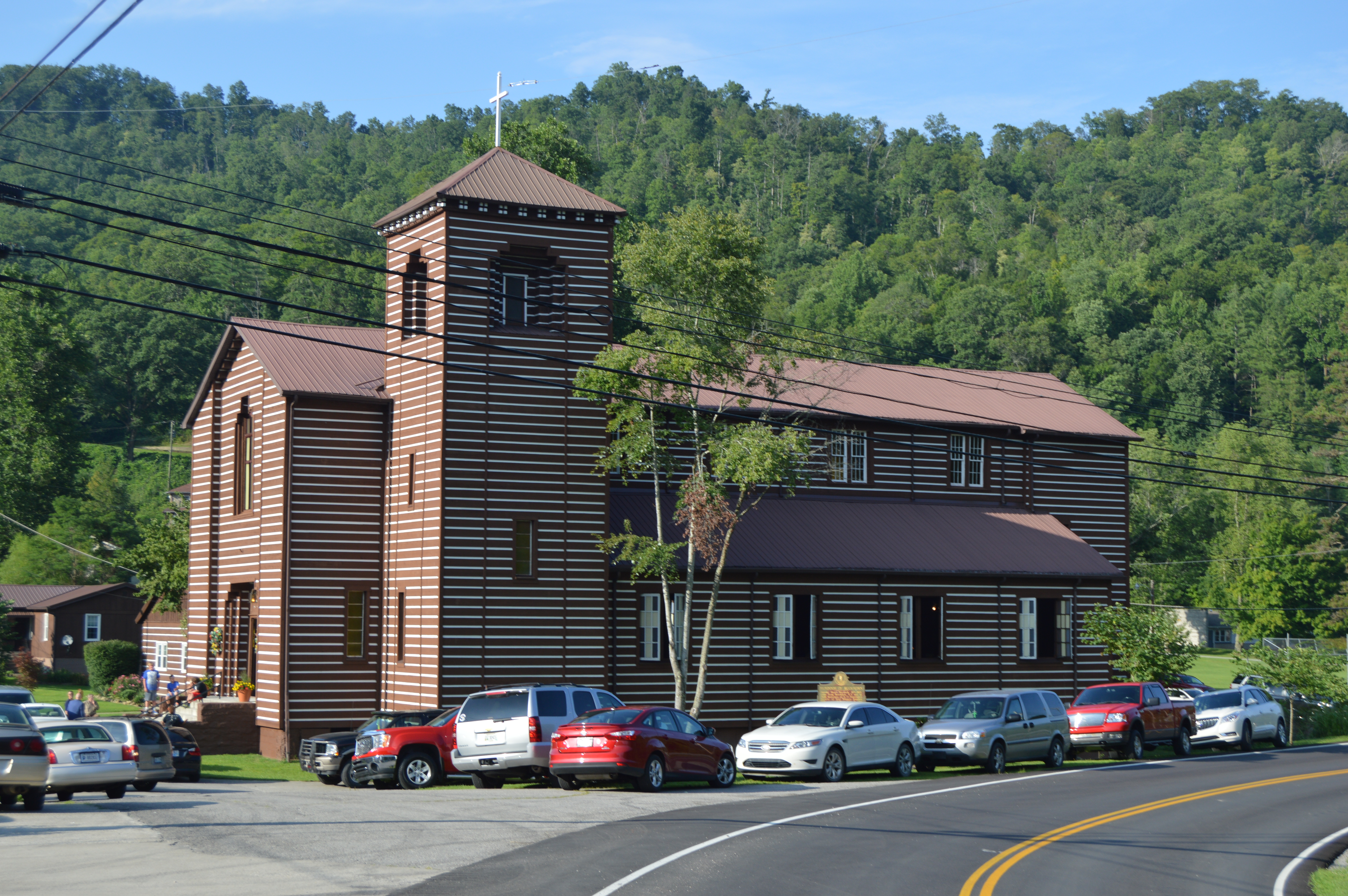
- Southern side of the church

- Location within Kentucky Location within the United States
- Location: Off Kentucky Route 28 in Buckhorn, Kentucky
- Coordinates: 37°20′53″N 83°28′32″W
- Area: 5 acres (2.0 ha)
- Built: 1927; 99 years ago
- Architect: Greer, Edward F.
- Architectural style: Scandinavian
- NRHP reference No.: 75000818
- Added to NRHP: June 27, 1975

The Buckhorn Presbyterian Church (also known as the Buckhorn Lake Area Church) and the Geer Gymnasium are two historic log buildings located off KY 28 in Buckhorn, Kentucky. The church and the gymnasium, completed in 1928 and 1927 respectively, are the only two surviving buildings from Witherspoon College, a Buckhorn school which served grades 1–12. Presbyterian minister Harvey Murdoch established the church and school in 1902 in response to southeastern Kentucky's lack of educational facilities and permanent churches at the time. Both institutions grew rapidly; the school had 369 students by 1914, and when the new church building was constructed, the 865-member congregation was the largest rural Presbyterian church in Kentucky. The church and gymnasium were the last two buildings constructed for the college; the older buildings have since been lost to fire or demolition.

The buildings were added to the National Register in 1975.

== See also ==
- National Register of Historic Places listings in Kentucky
