= Fusonia, Kentucky =

Unincorporated community in Kentucky, United States

Fusonia
- Unincorporated community
- Location within the state of Kentucky Fusonia (the United States)
- Coordinates: 37°10′26″N 83°5′26″W
- Country: United States
- State: Kentucky
- County: Perry
- Elevation: 945 ft (288 m)
- Time zone: UTC-5 (Eastern (EST))
  - Summer (DST): UTC-4 (EDT)
- GNIS feature ID: 508054

Fusonia is an unincorporated community and coal town in Perry County, Kentucky, United States.

The community was named for the Fuson Mining Co., which closed in the 1930s. Their post office has been discontinued.
