= Vicco, Kentucky =

- Unincorporated community
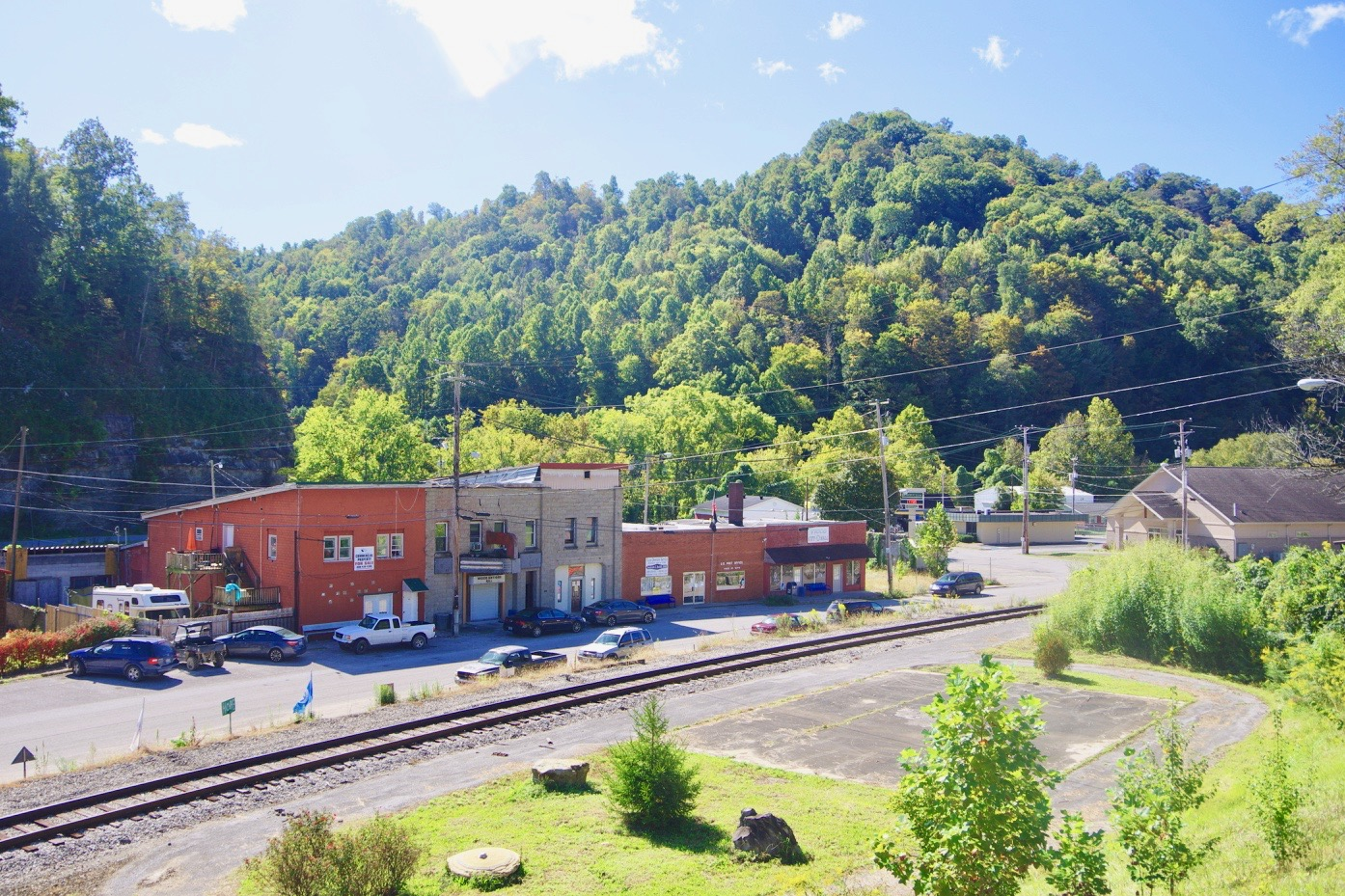
- Vicco

- Location in Perry County and Knott County, Kentucky
- Coordinates: 37°12′58″N 83°3′40″W
- Country: United States
- State: Kentucky
- Counties: Perry, Knott

Area
  - Total: 0.85 sq mi (2.20 km^{2})
  - Land: 0.84 sq mi (2.17 km^{2})
  - Water: 0.012 sq mi (0.03 km^{2})
- Elevation: 942 ft (287 m)

Population (2020)
  - Total: 327
  - Density: 390/sq mi (150.5/km^{2})
- Time zone: UTC-5 (Eastern (EST))
  - Summer (DST): UTC-4 (EDT)
- ZIP code: 41773
- Area code: 606
- FIPS code: 21-79590
- GNIS feature ID: 0506035

Vicco was a city in Perry and Knott counties, Kentucky, United States as defined by Kentucky Act Acts Ch. 25. As of the 2020 census, Vicco had a population of 327.

On January 16, 2013, Vicco became the smallest city in the United States to pass an ordinance outlawing discrimination based on sexual orientation.

The town was dissolved by the Kentucky Department for Local Government on May 20, 2025.

== History ==
Vicco was originally a coal mining town; its name comes from the initials of the Virginia Iron Coal and Coke Company. The city was known for its bars and entertainment; The New York Times described it as "the local coal miner's Vegas". The decline of the coal industry in the region brought economic trouble to Vicco, as local businesses closed and the city faced severe budget deficits. However, in the early 2010s, the city attempted a revival, restarting its defunct police force among other measures.

=== Dissolution ===
On March 24, 2022, Governor Andy Beshear signed Senate Bill 106 to simplify the processes of dissolving a defunct city and cut local taxes. In the Commonwealth of Kentucky, cities are classified as defunct when it collects taxes from people who live there, but do not have the elected officers to spend the revenue.

Scott Alexander, Judge/Executive of Perry County, classified Vicco as defunct in 2020. Alexander stated, "The residents of Vicco, they're still being charged a tax on their insurance," he said. "But, that money is just sitting in a pot and can't be spent by anyone, and therefore we're looking at dissolving Vicco to help those residents so they will no longer have to pay those taxes".

Senate Bill 106 gave Vicco and other defunct cities until January 1, 2023, to satisfy requirements to avoid dissolution. As of November 14, 2022, no action by the city had been taken and Perry County assumed most responsibilities of the defunct city.

The city was administratively dissolved by the Kentucky Department for Local Government on May 20, 2025.

== Geography ==
Vicco is located in eastern Perry County at 37°12′58″N 83°3′40″W (37.216186, -83.061089). A small portion of the city extends northeast into neighboring Knott County. The city is in the valley of the Carr Fork, a west-flowing tributary of the North Fork of the Kentucky River.

Kentucky Route 15 passes through the center of Vicco, leading west 11 miles (18 km) to Hazard, the Perry county seat, and east 20 miles (32 km) to Whitesburg.

According to the United States Census Bureau, Vicco has a total area of 0.85 square miles (2.2 km^{2}), of which 0.01 square miles (0.03 km^{2}), or 1.26%, are water.

== Demographics ==
Historical population
Census	Pop.	Note	%±
1970	377		—
1980	456		21.0%
1990	244		−46.5%
2000	318		30.3%
2010	334		5.0%
2020	327		−2.1%
U.S. Decennial Census

As of the census of 2000, there were 318 people, 132 households, and 93 families residing in the city. The population density was 411.2 inhabitants per square mile (158.8/km^{2}). There were 152 housing units at an average density of 196.6 per square mile (75.9/km^{2}). The racial makeup of the city was 99.69% White and 0.31% from two or more races.

There were 132 households, of which 28.8% had children under the age of 18 living in them, 49.2% were married couples living together, 16.7% had a female householder with no husband present, and 29.5% were non-families. 27.3% of all households were made up of individuals, and 7.6% had someone living alone who was 65 years of age or older. The average household size was 2.41 and the average family size was 2.91.

In the city, the population was spread out, with 23.9% under the age of 18, 8.5% from 18 to 24, 27.7% from 25 to 44, 27.4% from 45 to 64, and 12.6% who were 65 years of age or older. The median age was 36 years. For every 100 females, there were 86.0 males. For every 100 females age 18 and over, there were 87.6 males.

The median income for a household in the city was $13,235, and the median income for a family was $14,688. Males had a median income of $31,875 versus $22,500 for females. The per capita income for the city was $10,325. About 42.4% of families and 39.5% of the population were below the poverty line, including 42.4% of those under age 18 and 26.9% of those age 65 or over.
