= Napfor, Kentucky =

Unincorporated community in Kentucky, United States

Napfor
- Unincorporated community
- Location within the state of Kentucky Napfor (the United States)
- Coordinates: 37°18′48″N 83°18′44″W
- Country: United States
- State: Kentucky
- County: Perry
- Elevation: 814 ft (248 m)
- Time zone: UTC-5 (Eastern (EST))
  - Summer (DST): UTC-4 (EDT)
- GNIS feature ID: 514183

Napfor is an unincorporated community and coal town in Perry County, Kentucky, United States.
