= Dunraven, Kentucky =

Unincorporated community in Kentucky, United States

Dunraven
- Unincorporated community
- Location within the state of Kentucky Dunraven (the United States)
- Coordinates: 37°18′21″N 83°18′11″W
- Country: United States
- State: Kentucky
- County: Perry
- Elevation: 817 ft (249 m)
- Time zone: UTC-5 (Eastern (EST))
  - Summer (DST): UTC-4 (EDT)
- GNIS feature ID: 511960

Dunraven is an unincorporated community located in Perry County, Kentucky, United States. Its post office is closed.
