= Upper Squabble, Kentucky =

Upper Squabble
- Ghost town
- Location within the state of Kentucky
- Coordinates: 37°17′18″N 83°32′41″W
- Country: United States
- State: Kentucky
- County: Perry
- Elevation: 1,191 ft (363 m)
- Time zone: UTC-5 (Eastern (EST))
  - Summer (DST): UTC-4 (EDT)
- GNIS feature ID: 2557246

Upper Squabble is a ghost town located in Perry County, Kentucky, United States.
