= Kodak, Kentucky =

Unincorporated community in Kentucky, US

Kodak
- Unincorporated community
- Location within the state of Kentucky Kodak (the United States)
- Coordinates: 37°12′19″N 83°1′53″W
- Country: United States
- State: Kentucky
- County: Perry
- Elevation: 1,096 ft (334 m)
- Time zone: UTC-5 (Eastern (EST))
  - Summer (DST): UTC-4 (EDT)
- GNIS feature ID: 495867

Kodak is an unincorporated community and coal town in Perry County, Kentucky, United States. Their post office is closed.
