= Lamont, Kentucky =

Unincorporated community in Kentucky, United States

Lamont
- Unincorporated community
- Location within the state of Kentucky Lamont (the United States)
- Coordinates: 37°20′59″N 83°18′49″W
- Country: United States
- State: Kentucky
- County: Perry
- Elevation: 830 ft (250 m)
- Time zone: UTC-5 (Eastern (EST))
  - Summer (DST): UTC-4 (EDT)
- GNIS feature ID: 513197

Lamont is an unincorporated community and coal town in Perry County, Kentucky, United States. Their post office has been closed.
