= Harveyton, Kentucky =

Unincorporated community in Kentucky, United States

Harveyton
- Unincorporated community
- Location within the state of Kentucky Harveyton (the United States)
- Coordinates: 37°18′44″N 83°12′6″W
- Country: United States
- State: Kentucky
- County: Perry
- Elevation: 1,020 ft (310 m)
- Time zone: UTC-5 (Eastern (EST))
  - Summer (DST): UTC-4 (EDT)
- GNIS feature ID: 493852

Harveyton is an unincorporated community located in Perry County, Kentucky, United States.

The coal town was built around the Harvey Coal Company mine. A post office was established in 1916 with the name Staub; it was renamed Harveyton in 1923. Its post office has since closed.
