= Christopher, Kentucky =

Unincorporated community in Kentucky, United States

Christopher
- Unincorporated community
- Location within the state of Kentucky Christopher (the United States)
- Coordinates: 37°14′1″N 83°10′17″W
- Country: United States
- State: Kentucky
- County: Perry
- Elevation: 886 ft (270 m)
- Time zone: UTC-6 (Central (CST))
  - Summer (DST): UTC-5 (CST)
- GNIS feature ID: 511361

Christopher is an unincorporated community and coal town in Perry County, Kentucky, United States. Their post office has been closed.

A post office was established in 1914 in the community then called Douglas. Douglas was renamed Christopher in 1918 in honor of the local Columbus Mining Co., whose founders are said to have come from Columbus, Ohio.
