= Diablock, Kentucky =

Unincorporated community in Kentucky, United States

Diablock
- Census-designated place (CDP)
- Location within the state of Kentucky Diablock (the United States)
- Coordinates: 37°13′42″N 83°10′20″W
- Country: United States
- State: Kentucky
- County: Perry

Area
  - Total: 0.21 sq mi (0.55 km^{2})
  - Land: 0.20 sq mi (0.53 km^{2})
  - Water: 0.0077 sq mi (0.02 km^{2})
- Elevation: 915 ft (279 m)

Population (2020)
  - Total: 409
  - Density: 2,013/sq mi (777.3/km^{2})
- Time zone: UTC-6 (Central (CST))
  - Summer (DST): UTC-5 (CST)
- ZIP codes: 41722
- FIPS code: 21-21358
- GNIS feature ID: 511803

Diablock is a census-designated place, unincorporated community and coal town in Perry County, Kentucky, United States. As of the 2020 census, Diablock had a population of 409. The town's post office has been closed in late 1916.

== Demographics ==
Historical population
Census	Pop.	Note	%±
2020	409		—
U.S. Decennial Census
