= Jeff, Kentucky =

Unincorporated community in Kentucky, United States

Jeff
- Census-designated place (CDP)
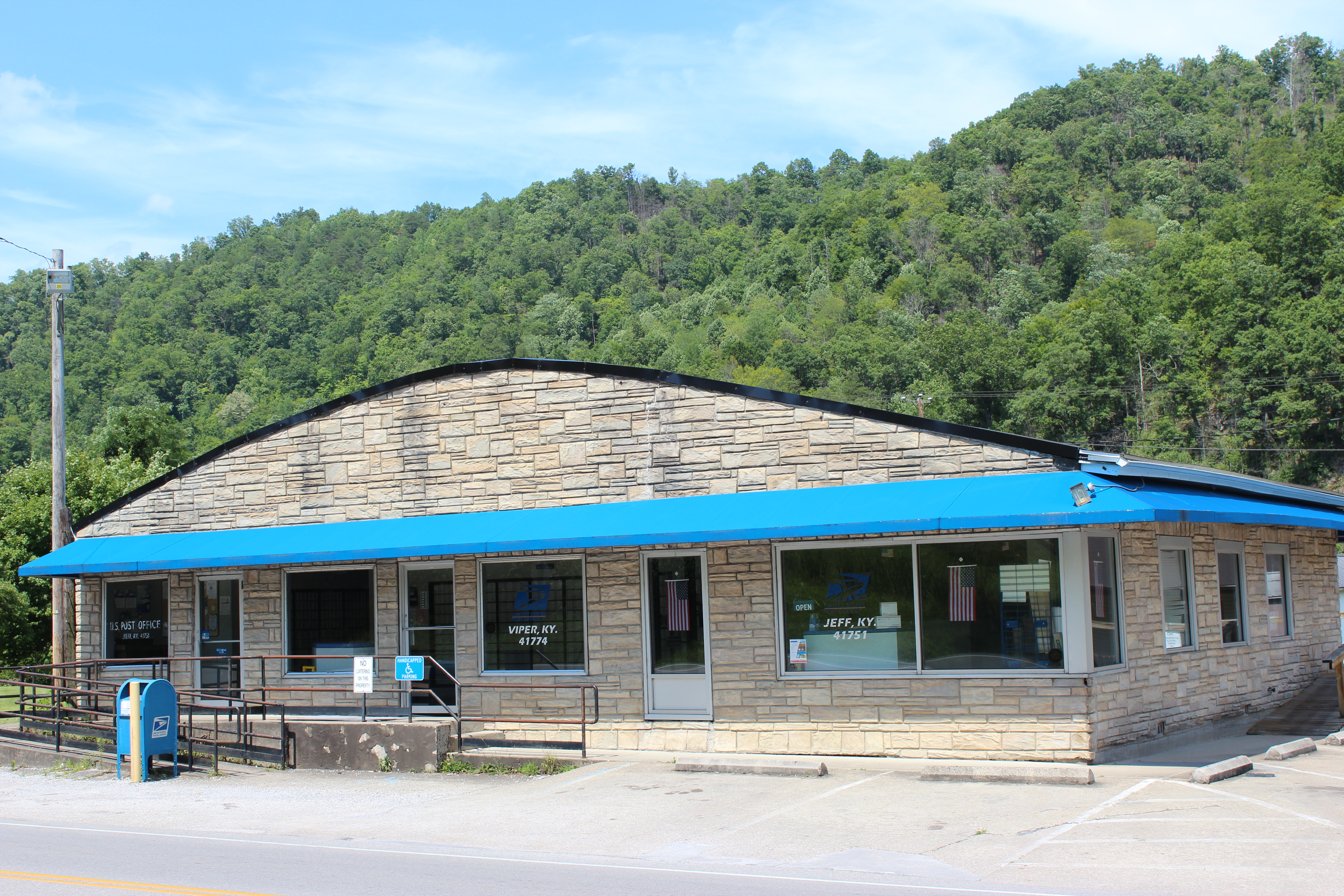
- Jeff and Viper Post Office

- Location within the state of Kentucky Jeff (the United States)
- Coordinates: 37°12′18″N 83°8′11″W
- Country: United States
- State: Kentucky
- County: Perry

Government
  - Type: Jeff

Area
  - Total: 0.79 sq mi (2.04 km^{2})
  - Land: 0.76 sq mi (1.96 km^{2})
  - Water: 0.031 sq mi (0.08 km^{2})
- Elevation: 915 ft (279 m)

Population (2020)
  - Total: 293
  - Density: 387.1/sq mi (149.47/km^{2})
- Time zone: UTC-5 (Eastern (EST))
  - Summer (DST): UTC-4 (EDT)
- ZIP code: 41751
- Area code: 606
- FIPS code: 21-40204
- GNIS feature ID: 516758

Jeff is a census-designated place and coal town in Perry County, Kentucky, United States. As of the 2020 census, Jeff had a population of 293.

A post office was established in the community in 1902 and named for the early settler Jefferson Combs.

== Demographics ==
Historical population
Census	Pop.	Note	%±
2020	293		—
U.S. Decennial Census
