= Happy, Kentucky =

Unincorporated community in Kentucky, United States

Happy
- Unincorporated community
- Location within the state of Kentucky Happy (the United States)
- Coordinates: 37°12′14″N 83°5′48″W
- Country: United States
- State: Kentucky
- County: Perry
- Elevation: 935 ft (285 m)
- Time zone: UTC-5 (Eastern (EST))
  - Summer (DST): UTC-4 (EDT)
- ZIP codes: 41746
- GNIS feature ID: 493697

Happy is an unincorporated community located in Perry County, Kentucky, United States.

A post office called Happy was established in 1908. The community's name recalls the happy mood of a large share of the first settlers. Happy has been noted for its unusual place name.
