= Wolverine, Kentucky =

Unincorporated community in Kentucky, United States

Wolverine
- Unincorporated community
- Location within the state of Kentucky Wolverine (the United States)
- Coordinates: 37°34′51″N 83°24′30″W
- Country: United States
- State: Kentucky
- County: Breathitt
- Elevation: 722 ft (220 m)
- Time zone: UTC-6 (Central (CST))
  - Summer (DST): UTC-5 (CST)
- ZIP codes: 41394
- GNIS feature ID: 509398

Wolverine is an unincorporated community and coal town in Breathitt County, Kentucky, United States.
