= Krypton, Kentucky =

Unincorporated community in Kentucky, United States

Krypton
- Unincorporated community
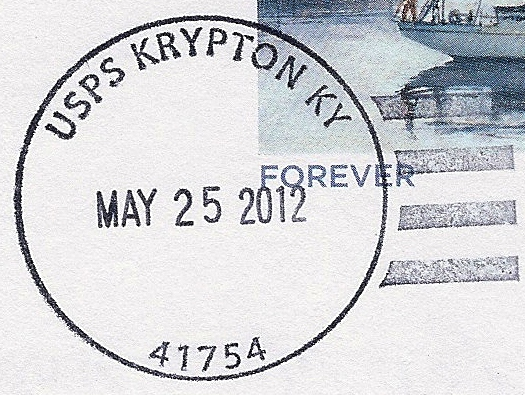

- Location within the state of Kentucky Krypton (the United States)
- Coordinates: 37°18′40″N 83°20′22″W
- Country: United States
- State: Kentucky
- County: Perry
- Elevation: 1,037 ft (316 m)
- Time zone: UTC-5 (Eastern (EST))
  - Summer (DST): UTC-4 (EDT)
- ZIP codes: 41754
- GNIS feature ID: 513180

Krypton is an unincorporated community within Perry County, Kentucky, United States. Their post office is still active as of May 2012.
