= Combs, Kentucky =

Unincorporated community in Kentucky, United States

Combs
- Census-designated place
- Location within the state of Kentucky Combs (the United States)
- Coordinates: 37°16′1″N 83°12′46″W
- Country: United States
- State: Kentucky
- County: Perry

Area
  - Total: 0.34 sq mi (0.87 km^{2})
  - Land: 0.32 sq mi (0.83 km^{2})
  - Water: 0.015 sq mi (0.04 km^{2})
- Elevation: 935 ft (285 m)

Population (2020)
  - Total: 339
  - Density: 1,054.5/sq mi (407.16/km^{2})
- Time zone: UTC-5 (Eastern (EST))
  - Summer (DST): UTC-4 (EDT)
- ZIP code: 41729
- Area code: 606
- FIPS code: 21-16822
- GNIS feature ID: 489894

Combs is an unincorporated community and census-designated place in Perry County, Kentucky, United States. It was named for Abijah Benjamin Combs. At one time, the town was called Lennut; its post office, no longer existent, used this name.

The population of the CDP was 339 at the 2020 Census.

== Demographics ==
Historical population
Census	Pop.	Note	%±
2020	339		—
U.S. Decennial Census

The population of the CDP was 339 and the racial makeup was 94.4% white, 0.9% Asian, 1.2% Other and 3.5 two or more races.
