= Calloway County High School =

Public school in Kentucky, United States

Location
- 2110 College Farm Road; Murray, Kentucky 42071; United States; 36.61849°N 88.34106°W

Information
- Type: Public
- Established: 1960
- School district: Calloway County School District
- Superintendent: Tres Settle
- Principal: Bobby Love
- Staff: 48.20 (FTE)
- Grades: 9 to 12
- Enrollment: 843 (2023-2024)
- Student to teacher ratio: 17.49
- Campus: Small city
- Colors: Red, White and Columbia Blue
- Slogan: "Laker Pride is County Wide"
- Athletics: 19 varsity teams
- Athletics conference: KHSAA
- Sports: Athletic Director- Mary Price
- Mascot: Laker
- Nickname: "Lakers" and "Lady Lakers"
- Endowment: US$14.8 million
- Website: cchs.calloway.kyschools.us

Calloway County High School is a public high school located in Murray, Kentucky, United States. The school was formed from the consolidation of six high schools from across the county: Hazel High School, Lynn Grove High School, Kirksey High School, Almo High School, New Concord High School, and Faxon High School.

== Organizations ==
Clubs and Organizations:

- Academic Team
- Archery
- Band
- Bass Fishing
- B.A.S.S. Club
- Beta Club
- Cheer
- Chemistry Team
- Choir
- Educators Rising
- FFA
- F.B.L.A.
- Future Problem Solving Team
- HOSA
- Kentucky United Nations Assembly
- Kentucky Youth Assembly
- Laker Review
- Leadership Tomorrow
- National Science Honor Society
- Pep Club
- Robotics Team
- Senior Class Prom Committee
- Science Bowl Team
- Skills USA
- Spanish Club
- Speech Team
- Student Council
- Technology Student Association
- Yearbook

Athletic Clubs:

- Baseball
- Boys Basketball
- Girls Basketball
- Cross Country (boys & girls)
- Football
- Golf (boys & girls)
- Boys Soccer
- Girls Soccer
- Fast Pitch Softball
- Tennis (boys & girls)
- Track (boys & girls)
- Volleyball
- Wrestling
- Cheerleading

== State champions ==
Multiple state championships in speech/debate

- Wrestling: David Woods 195 lbs (2017)
- Bass Fishing: Bracken Robertson & Dillon Starks (2013)
- Boys Cross Country: 1984 (2A)
- Fast Pitch Softball: 2004
- Girls Golf: 2012 (Individual, Anna Hack)
- Girls Track & Field: 2026 (2A)

== Notable alumni ==
- W. Earl Brown, actor
