= Big Creek (Perry, Kentucky) =

River in Kentucky, United States

Coordinates: 37°13′28″N 83°16′31″W

Big Creek is a stream in Perry County, Kentucky in the United States. It a tributary of the North Fork Kentucky River that joins it 1 mile (1.6 km) upstream of Typo and 5 miles (8.0 km) downstream of Hazard, at an altitude of 810 feet (250 m). It is nearly 10 miles (16 km) long, and is paralleled by Kentucky Route 80 for some of its length.

== Tributaries and other locations ==
- Its major tributaries are:
  - Brown Fork 0.75 miles (1.21 km) upstream at an altitude of 935 feet (285 m)
    - Curley Fork 1 mile (1.6 km) upstream at an altitude of 860 feet (260 m)
    - Campbell Branch 1.75 miles (2.82 km) upstream at an altitude of 900 feet (270 m)
    - Sheep Hollow 3 miles (4.8 km) upstream at an altitude of 980 feet (300 m)
    - Bull Fork 4.5 miles (7.2 km) upstream at an altitude of 1,070 feet (330 m)
  - Coal Harbor Branch 1.25 miles (2.01 km) upstream at an altitude of 845 feet (258 m)
  - Amy Fork (or now simply Right Fork) 3 miles (4.8 km) upstream at an altitude of 886 feet (270 m)
    - Steep Field Branch 1.5 miles (2.4 km) upstream at an altitude of 1,015 feet (309 m)
  - Boar Branch 3.5 miles (5.6 km) upstream at an altitude of 895 feet (273 m)
  - Whittaker Branch 4.875 miles (7.846 km) upstream at an altitude of 927 feet (283 m)
  - Wolf Branch 4.875 miles (7.846 km) upstream at an altitude of 955 feet (291 m)
  - Ben's Branch 6.25 miles (10.06 km) upstream at an altitude of 980 feet (300 m)
  - Jenny Lick Branch (a.k.a. Nigger Branch) 6.375 miles (10.260 km) upstream at an altitude of 980 feet (300 m)
  - Jack's Branch 7.125 miles (11.467 km) upstream at an altitude of 997 feet (304 m)
  - Buffalo Fork 7.75 miles (12.47 km) upstream at an altitude of 1,025 feet (312 m)

=== General ===
The school house in 1918 was 5.25 miles (8.45 km) upstream of Big Creek. The Creek (including its tributaries) has historically had five post offices.

The Catur post office was established on 1880-03-12 by postmaster Benjamin T. Fields and was probably located on the Right Fork/Amy Branch. It closed on 1880-12-06.

The Begley post office, named for a local family, was established on 1910-03-31 by postmaster Link Eversole, and closed in the same month in 1911. It was on Big Creek itself. Irvine Eversole had coal mines on Jenny Lick Branch. One of them formerly belonged to Alfred Eversole, as did the mine on Big Creek that was subsequently owned by Matt Granover. Link Eversole Jr had a coal mine on Buffalo Fork, and Link Eversole himself one on Big Creek 9 miles (14 km) upstream. John Eversole had a mine on Big Creek itself, 8.25 miles (13.28 km) upstream.

The Tug post office, established on 1917-09-15 by postmaster Ballard F. Fields, was also on Big Creek itself. There are two people that this was possibly named after: Tug Field, a local 24-year-old farmer, or a 60-year-old widower also named Tug who was listed in the 1910 census.

The fifth post office (after Avawam, below) was the eponymous Browns Fork on Brown's Fork, established in 1946 by post master Marion Couch, which closed in 1946.

Other old mines along the Creek have included one owned by John Morgan and one owned by Bud Couch on Steep Field Branch, one owned by Levi Couch on a minor fork off Steep Field Branch, one owned by Cady Shepherd on Amy Fork, and one owned by Wilson Baker on Boar Fork.

Peter Whittaker had a coal mine on the eponymous Whittaker Branch, the heirs of the local Combs family had mines on Wilf Branch, and Andrew Browning had a mine on Ben's Branch.

A minor branch of Jack's Branch was the eponymous Minyard Branch, site of Elihu Minyard's old coal mine.

=== Avawam ===
Close to the site of Catur, at least at one point in its well-travelled life, was Avawam post office. This was established on 1892-12-10 by postmaster Alfred Couch. He originally wanted it to be called Couch, but when that was not possible chose Wigwam or Agawam, which according to the tale told by his son was named after Agawam, Massachusetts. However, this came out, in (so the tale goes) a "slip" of the tongue/pen, as Avawam.

Avawam moved around more than most post offices in east Kentucky. It was first at the mouth of Brown's Fork, but by 1915 had moved to Amy Fork. It moved, with postmaster John D. Fields in October 1916 to the mouth of Mudlick Fork on Amy Fork, who then moved it in April 1917 over the county line to McIntosh Creek; only for it to move back again to Mudlick Fork in October 1917, this time with postmaster Henry C. Fields. John Fields owned land on Amy Fork, Henry Fields and Rufus Fields had coal mines on Sheep Field Branch, and Walter Fields had a mine on Amy Fork. Mrs Charles Fields had a mine on Boar Branch, and R. B. Fields had a mine on Big Creek itself, just upstream of Whittaker Branch.

There were a number of further moves in the period from the 1920s to 1940, in 1941 coming back to Amy/Right Fork. After a few final moves Avawam reached its current position, 1.2 miles (1.9 km) upstream Amy/Right Fork, slightly upstream of the mouth of Steep Field Branch.

== See also ==
- List of rivers of Kentucky

== Sources ==
- Hodge, James Michael (1918). Coals of the North Fork of Kentucky River in Perry and Portions of Breathitt and Knott Counties. Reports of the Kentucky Geological Survey 4th series 1912–1918. Vol. 3. Frankfort, Kentucky: The State Journal Company. (Coals of the North Fork of Kentucky River in Perry and Portions of Breathitt and Knott Counties at the Internet Archive)
- Rennick, Robert M. (2000a). "Perry County – Post Offices". County Histories of Kentucky. No. 273. Morehead State University.
