= Kentucky Route 28 =

State highway in Kentucky, United States

Kentucky Route 28
- KY 28 highlighted in red

Route information
- Maintained by KYTC
- Length: 36.217 mi (58.286 km)

Major junctions
- West end: KY 11 / KY 30 in Booneville
- East end: KY 15 in Perry Co

Location
- Country: United States
- State: Kentucky
- Counties: Owsley, Breathitt, Perry

Highway system
- Kentucky State Highway System; Interstate; US; State; Parkways
← US 27	→ KY 29

Kentucky Route 28 (KY 28) is a 36.217-mile-long (58.286 km) state highway in the U.S. state of Kentucky that travels from KY 11 and KY 30 in Booneville to KY 15 in northern rural Perry County via Cow Creek, Arnett, Buckhorn, and Chavies. KY 28 begins in Booneville by traveling concurrently with KY 30 east while KY 30 west travels through town to the northwest. KY 30 veers off at the official beginning of KY 28 at Mulberry Street. KY 28 heads out of Booneville in Owsley County, heading southeast. About 11 miles (18 km) southeast of Booneville, KY 28 enters Breathitt County. After about 6 miles (9.7 km) through Breathitt County, KY 28 enters Perry County. KY 28 passes through the community of Buckhorn before making a short reentry into Breathitt County. After returning to Perry County, KY 28 passes through the community of Chavies before ending at KY 15 at Grapevine in Perry County.

== Major intersections ==
County	Location	mi	km	Destinations	Notes
Owsley	Booneville	0.000	0.000	KY 11 / KY 30 (Mulberry Street)	Western terminus
Owsley		2.877	4.630	KY 2024 south	West end of KY 2024 overlap
Owsley		3.073	4.946	KY 2024 north (Bear Run Road)	East end of KY 2024 overlap
Owsley		4.894	7.876	KY 2152 east (Left Fork Cow Creek Road)	Western terminus of KY 2152
Owsley		5.992	9.643	KY 1768 south	Northern terminus of KY 1768
Breathitt		14.217	22.880	KY 315 north	Southern terminus of KY 315
Perry	Buckhorn	17.631	28.374	KY 2022 south (Squabble Creek Road) / KY 1387 south	Northern terminus of KY 2022; northern terminus of KY 1387
Perry–Breathitt county line		22.490	36.194	KY 1110 north	Southern terminus of KY 1110
Perry		25.938	41.743	KY 1833 south	Northern terminus of KY 1833
Perry		30.082	48.412	KY 451 south	Northern terminus of KY 451
Perry		36.217	58.286	KY 15	Eastern terminus
1.000 mi = 1.609 km; 1.000 km = 0.621 mi: Concurrency terminus

Owsley County + Breathitt County = 18.154
