= Tilford, Kentucky =

Unincorporated community in Kentucky, United States

Tilford
- Unincorporated community
- Location within the state of Kentucky Tilford (the United States)
- Coordinates: 37°1′50″N 83°3′58″W
- Country: United States
- State: Kentucky
- County: Perry
- Elevation: 1,709 ft (521 m)
- Time zone: UTC-5 (Eastern (EST))
  - Summer (DST): UTC-4 (EDT)
- GNIS feature ID: 515950

Tilford is an unincorporated community located in Perry County, Kentucky, United States. Its post office is closed.
