= Doorway, Kentucky =

Unincorporated community in Kentucky, United States

Doorway
- Unincorporated community
- Location within the state of Kentucky Doorway (the United States)
- Coordinates: 37°17′45″N 83°32′22″W
- Country: United States
- State: Kentucky
- County: Perry
- Elevation: 1,047 ft (319 m)
- Time zone: UTC-5 (Eastern (EST))
  - Summer (DST): UTC-4 (EDT)
- GNIS feature ID: 511866

Doorway is an unincorporated community located in Perry County, Kentucky, United States. Their post office closed in early 1959.

The origin of the name "Doorway" is obscure.
