= Yerkes, Kentucky =

Unincorporated community in Kentucky, United States

Yerkes
- Unincorporated community
- Location within the state of Kentucky Yerkes (the United States)
- Coordinates: 37°16′38″N 83°18′4″W
- Country: United States
- State: Kentucky
- County: Perry
- Elevation: 876 ft (267 m)
- Time zone: UTC-5 (Eastern (EST))
  - Summer (DST): UTC-4 (EDT)
- ZIP codes: 41778
- GNIS feature ID: 516508

Yerkes is an unincorporated community and coal town in Perry County, Kentucky, United States.
