= Buckhorn Lake State Resort Park =

State park in Kentucky, United States

- Location within Kentucky Location within the United States
- Type: Kentucky state park
- Location: Perry County, Kentucky
- Coordinates: 37°18′20″N 83°26′21″W
- Area: 856 acres (346 ha)
- Created: 1961
- Operator: Kentucky Department of Parks
- Open: Year-round
- Website: Official website

Buckhorn Lake State Resort Park is a state park located in the northwest corner of Perry County, Kentucky. The park itself encompasses 856 acres (346 ha), while Buckhorn Lake, a mountain reservoir lake which serves as its major feature and which was created by damming the Middle Fork of the Kentucky River, covers approximately 1,230 acres (500 ha). The park is adjacent to the northern edge of the Daniel Boone National Forest.

== Activities and amenities ==
- Buckhorn Lake: The lake offers swimming, boating and canoeing. Fishermen can angle for muskie, as a large population of the predator fish lives in the lake.
- Trails: The self-guided Moonshiner's Hollow Interpretive Trail winds 1.5 miles (2.4 km) past 18 learning stations that teach hikers about the geology, flora, and fauna of the area. More experienced hikers may prefer the more difficult Leatherwood Trail, which connects with the Moonshiner's Hollow Trail.
- Accommodations: The park offers a 36-room lodge and five cottages, all overlooking Buckhorn Lake.
