= Busy, Kentucky =

Unincorporated community in Kentucky, United States

Busy
- Unincorporated community
- Location within the state of Kentucky Busy (the United States)
- Coordinates: 37°16′42″N 83°17′26″W
- Country: United States
- State: Kentucky
- County: Perry
- Elevation: 915 ft (279 m)
- Time zone: UTC-5 (Eastern (EST))
  - Summer (DST): UTC-4 (EDT)
- ZIP code: 41723
- Area code: 606
- GNIS feature ID: 511097

Busy is an unincorporated community located in Perry County, Kentucky, United States.

A post office called Busy was established in 1924. The community was so named on account of its enterprising citizens (i.e. "busy as bees"). Busy has been noted for its unusual place name. The population was listed as 1,066 as of 2024.
