= Letcher, Kentucky =

Unincorporated community in Kentucky, United States

Coordinates: 37°08′42″N 82°57′33″W

Letcher is an unincorporated community in Letcher County, Kentucky. It is served by a post office that is assigned zip code 41832.
