= Lost Creek (Kentucky) =

River in Kentucky, United States

Physical characteristics
- Source: Lost Creek headwaters
  - coordinates: 37°19′16″N 83°10′55″W
- 2nd source: Ten Mile Creek headwaters
  - coordinates: 37°22′09″N 83°17′23″W
- 3rd source: Fifteen Mile Creek headwaters
  - coordinates: 37°20′24″N 83°14′17″W
- 4th source: Sixteen Mile Creek headwaters
  - coordinates: 37°19′28″N 83°12′07″W
- Mouth: Troublesome Creek
  - coordinates: 37°28′41″N 83°19′22″W

Lost Creek is a creek that is mainly in Breathitt County, Kentucky in the United States. It a tributary of the Troublesome Creek tributary of the North Fork Kentucky River that it joins over the county line in Perry County slightly more than 1 mile (1.6 km) upstream of the mouth of Troublesome, at an altitude of 810 feet (250 m). It is 10 miles (16 km) long. The junction of Kentucky Route 476 with Kentucky Route 15 about 6 miles (9.7 km) south-southeast of Jackson is nearby.

The name "Lost" is associated anecdotally with people getting lost or losing things, from hunters and early travellers getting lost having strayed too far from the route of the Creek, through a family losing all of their possessions on a part of the Creek that was frozen, to famous local people such as Ned O'Grady, Colby Haddix, and Barney Russell becoming lost there.

== Tributaries and other locations ==
- Its major tributaries are:
  - Mill Branch 2 miles (3.2 km) upstream, mouth at 37°27′40″N 83°19′00″W headwaters at 37°26′10″N 83°19′51″W
  - Leatherwood Branch, mouth at 37°26′34″N 83°18′44″W headwaters at 37°23′50″N 83°17′45″W
  - Cockerell's Fork (also Cockrell Fork) 8.75 miles (14.08 km) upstream, mouth at 37°24′44″N 83°16′19″W headwaters at 37°23′02″N 83°13′20″W
  - Ten Mile Creek 10 miles (16 km) upstream at an altitude of 815 feet (248 m), mouth at 37°23′56″N 83°16′10″W
    - Rock House Fork, mouth at 37°23′17″N 83°16′23″W headwaters at 37°21′35″N 83°15′32″W
      - Hollybush Branch, mouth at 37°23′08″N 83°16′10″W headwaters at 37°22′02″N 83°16′39″W
  - Collins Branch 11.25 miles (18.11 km) upstream
  - Low Gap Branch 12.25 miles (19.71 km) upstream at an altitude of 890 feet (270 m), mouth at 37°22′49″N 83°14′25″W headwaters at 37°22′33″N 83°14′52″W
  - Fifteen Mile Creek 15 miles (24 km) upstream at an altitude of 910 feet (280 m), mouth at 37°21′56″N 83°14′14″W
  - Sixteen Mile Creek 16 miles (26 km) upstream at an altitude of 925 feet (282 m), mouth at 37°21′47″N 83°13′43″W
    - Strong Branch 1.25 miles (2.01 km) upstream at an altitude of 995 feet (303 m), mouth at 37°20′56″N 83°13′20″W headwaters at 37°20′22″N 83°13′51″W
    - Hiram Branch 2 miles (3.2 km) upstream at an altitude of 1,060 feet (320 m), mouth at 37°20′03″N 83°12′47″W headwaters at 37°20′15″N 83°12′19″W
  - Low Gap Branch 16.5 miles (26.6 km) upstream at an altitude of 945 feet (288 m), mouth at 37°21′56″N 83°13′15″W headwaters at 37°22′14″N 83°12′44″W
  - Will Branch 17.25 miles (27.76 km) upstream
  - Camp Branch 17.75 miles (28.57 km) upstream
  - Bowman Branch 18 miles (29 km) upstream
  - Rock Fork 18.5 miles (29.8 km) upstream at an altitude of 1,040 feet (320 m), mouth at 37°21′26″N 83°11′27″W headwaters at 37°21′27″N 83°11′01″W
  - Laurel Fork 19.5 miles (31.4 km) upstream at an altitude of 1,110 feet (340 m), mouth at 37°20′41″N 83°11′22″W headwaters at 37°19′17″N 83°11′18″W

The Ten, Fifteen, and Sixteen Mile Creeks are straightforwardly named for their distances upstream from Lost Creek mouth, a common naming convention in Kentucky.

=== in Perry County ===
Lost Creek has had two post offices in the parts of its watershed that are in Perry County.

Dice post office was authorized by William Campbell on 1903-05-09, but not established as the authorization was rescinded two months later. It was located near to the mouth of Sixteen Mile Creek. The local folklore is that it was named for someone named Dice, Dicie, or Dicey; although one recorded hypothesis that it was named for a Dicie Campbell, born in 1903, is clearly erroneous.

It was actually established on 1908-12-26 by postmaster Matt Combs, but only lasted until the middle of May 1911. It was established on 1923-02-15 by postmaster Andrew Jones, by which point there was a small village at Sixteen Mile Creek, but closed again in November 1936. It was established for a third time on 1942-08-13. It still exists today.

The Engle post office was established on 1959-03-07 by James B. Engle with his wife Frankie as the postmaster. Engle had originally wanted the name Oliver but that was already in use elsewhere in Breathitt. It started out on the Rock House Fork of Ten Mile Creek, moving 1 mile (1.6 km) along the creek to the Hollybush Branch of Ten Mile in 1938. It closed in 1980.

=== in Breathitt County ===
==== General ====
The Ned post office was established on 1886-02-26 by postmaster Jeremiah Combs. Popular folklore is that it was named for Edward P. "Ned" Turner, his son-in-law who married Mary Elizabeth Combs, but at the time Edward was only 12, unmarried (the marriage being in 1891) and still living with his family on Middle Fork. It is more probable that Combs named it for his neighbour, Edward "Ned" Sizemore.

The post office was at Cockerell's Fork, and a village including two mills and three general stores (including Combs's) grew up in the 1890s. The post office was taken over by Jeremiah's son John W. Combs who moved it 0.5 miles (0.80 km) upstream to the mouth of minor tributary Perkin's Branch. When it closed in 1984 it had been re-located back to Cockrell's Fork.

The Leatherwood post office was established on 1913-06-18 by postmaster Lewis Watts. It closed in April 1919, to be re-established sometime in the winter of 1934–1935. It was renamed Watts after the Watts family in 1949, although its environs remained known as Leatherwood. It remained open as a rural branch office from 1965 to 1973.

In 1910 L. H. Noble had a mine and a house at Leatherwood Branch, owning the land there. There was a Noble farm on a minor fork of Cockerell's Fork. (See Rowdy and Stacy for the adjacent Noble Fork of Troublesome Creek.) Green Noble had a mine at Low Gap Branch.

John Collingsworth had a mine on Collins Branch. Mahlon Jones had a mine in 1918 on Will Branch, and owned land on Low Gap Branch.

==== Lost Creek post office in Troublesome village ====
The Lost Creek post office was established on 1848-10-11 by postmaster Joseph B. Haddix. The village that grew around it in the 1880s was known as Troublesome, and included general stores (Day's and Sallee's) and a steam-powered saw and grist mill owned by a later postmaster named F. M. Day. The post office still exists today, and has ZIP code 41348.

== Climate ==
Many homes along the Creek were destroyed in a flash-flood that hit Troublesome Creek and its tributaries in July 2022.

== See also ==
- List of rivers of Kentucky

== Sources ==
- Hodge, James Michael (1910). "Report on the Coals of the Three Forks of the Kentucky River". Reports of the Kentucky Geological Survey (11). Lexington, Kentucky. (Report on the Coals of the Three Forks of the Kentucky River at the Internet Archive)
- Hodge, James Michael (1918). Coals of the North Fork of Kentucky River in Perry and Portions of Breathitt and Knott Counties. Reports of the Kentucky Geological Survey 4th series 1912–1918. Vol. 3. Frankfort, Kentucky: The State Journal Company. (Coals of the North Fork of Kentucky River in Perry and Portions of Breathitt and Knott Counties at the Internet Archive)
- Rennick, Robert M. (2000a). Perry County — Post Offices. County Histories of Kentucky. Vol. 273. Morehead State University.
- Rennick, Robert M. (2000b). Breathitt County — Post Offices. County Histories of Kentucky. Vol. 159. Morehead State University.
- Rennick, Robert M. (1990). Kentucky "Number" Place Names. Rennick Kentucky Place Names. Vol. 155. Morehead State University.
- State Primary Road System: Breathitt County (PDF) (Map). Kentucky Transportation Cabinet. 2012.
- United States Postal Service (2012). "USPS – Look Up a ZIP Code".
- Robertson, Campbell (October 29, 2022). "Months After the Floods, Eastern Kentucky Families Take Measure of What Was Lost". The New York Times.
- Aoyama, Andrew (April 2023). "Appalachia's Quiet Time Bombs". The Atlantic.
- Sandor, Julia (August 9, 2022). "Lost Creek residents hopeful for more help after President Biden's visit". WYMT Mountain News. Archived from the original on August 10, 2022.
