= Buckhorn, Kentucky =

- City
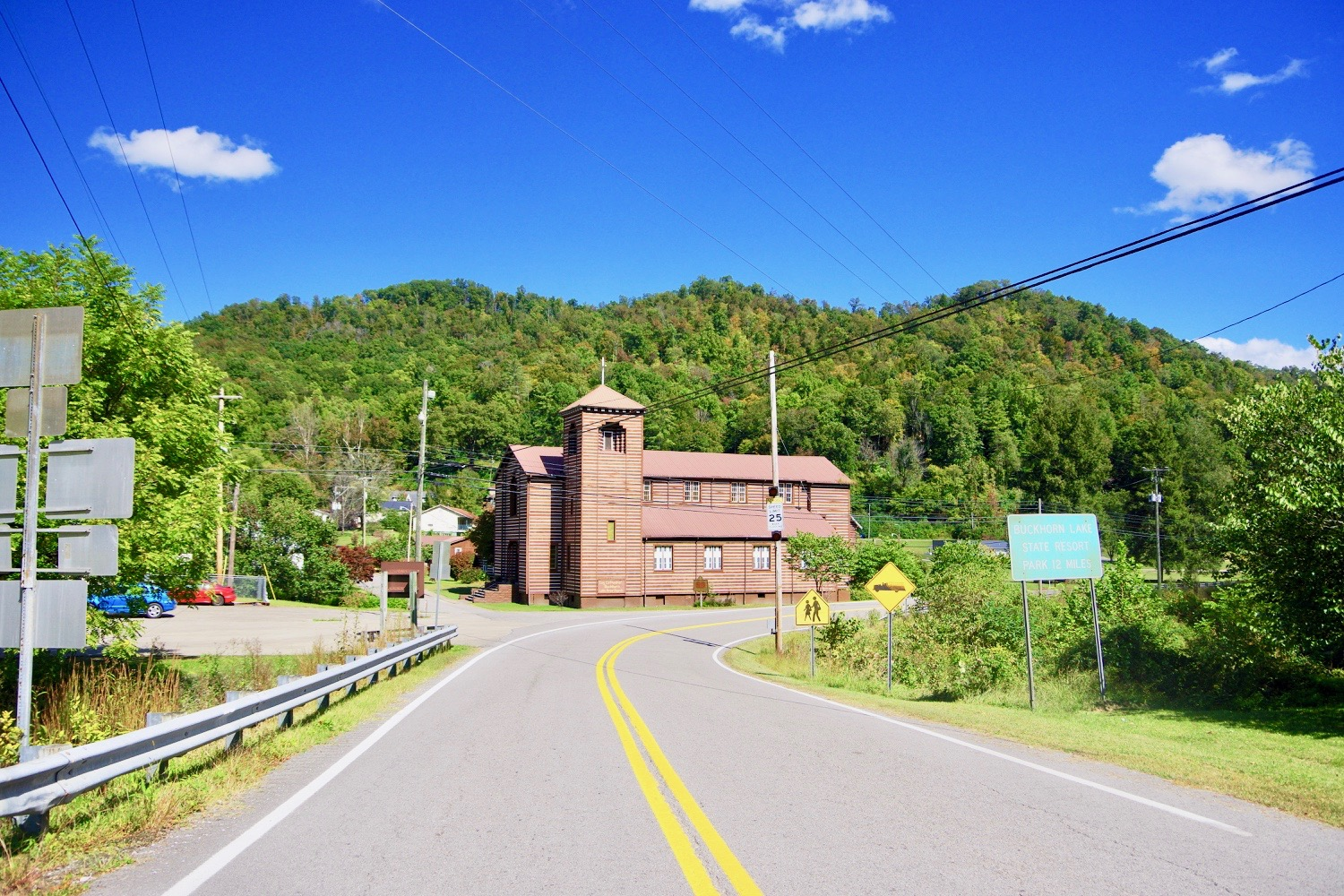
- KY 28 approaching Buckhorn Presbyterian Church

- Location of Buckhorn in Perry County, Kentucky.
- Coordinates: 37°20′45″N 83°28′16″W
- Country: United States
- State: Kentucky
- County: Perry
- Incorporated: January 12, 1996

Government
  - Type: City Commission
  - Mayor: Paul R. Turner

Area
  - Total: 0.35 sq mi (0.91 km^{2})
  - Land: 0.34 sq mi (0.87 km^{2})
  - Water: 0.015 sq mi (0.04 km^{2})
- Elevation: 755 ft (230 m)

Population (2020)
  - Total: 89
  - Density: 263.9/sq mi (101.91/km^{2})
- Time zone: UTC-5 (Eastern (EST))
  - Summer (DST): UTC-4 (EDT)
- ZIP code: 41721
- Area code: 606
- FIPS code: 21-10612
- GNIS feature ID: 0511025

Buckhorn is a home rule-class city in Perry County, Kentucky, in the United States. As of the 2020 census, Buckhorn had a population of 89. It is centered on the Buckhorn Presbyterian Church, a log structure listed on the National Register of Historic Places. The Buckhorn Children's Center and Buckhorn Lake State Resort Park are also located here.

The post office was established in 1902. Buckhorn was incorporated by the state legislature in 1996.

== History ==
According to local tradition, the name "Buckhorn" comes from an early settler, Jerry Smith, who had killed a large deer and had hung its antlers over an area spring. The name of the stream that flows through the area, Squabble Creek, is believed to have been named after a fight between Smith and his brothers.

== Geography ==
Buckhorn is located at 37°20′45″N 83°28′16″W (37.345879, -83.471060). The city lies in a broad valley along the Middle Fork of the Kentucky River and its tributary, Squabble Creek. Buckhorn Dam and its impoundment, Buckhorn Lake are located a short distance downstream on the river. Kentucky Route 28 passes through the city.

According to the United States Census Bureau, the city has a total area of 0.5 square miles (1.3 km^{2}), all land.

== Demographics ==
Historical population
Census	Pop.	Note	%±
2000	144		—
2010	162		12.5%
2020	89		−45.1%
U.S. Decennial Census

At the 2000 census there were 144 people, 48 households, and 33 families living in the city. The population density was 289.4 inhabitants per square mile (111.7/km^{2}). There were 51 housing units at an average density of 102.5 per square mile (39.6/km^{2}). The racial makeup of the city was 97.92% White and 2.08% African American. Of the 48 households 29.2% had children under the age of 18 living with them, 60.4% were married couples living together, 8.3% had a female householder with no husband present, and 31.3% were non-families. 31.3% of households were one person and 16.7% were one person aged 65 or older. The average household size was 2.38 and the average family size was 2.97.

The age distribution was 34.7% under the age of 18, 9.0% from 18 to 24, 27.8% from 25 to 44, 18.1% from 45 to 64, and 10.4% 65 or older. The median age was 30 years. For every 100 females, there were 100.0 males. For every 100 females age 18 and over, there were 108.9 males.

The median household income was $35,000 and the median family income was $51,250. Males had a median income of $26,250 versus $33,750 for females. The per capita income for the city was $13,742. There were 10.0% of families and 34.2% of the population living below the poverty line, including 5.9% of under eighteens and 55.6% of those over 64.
