= Glomawr, Kentucky =

Unincorporated community in Kentucky, United States

Glomawr
- Unincorporated community
- Location within the state of Kentucky Glomawr (the United States)
- Coordinates: 37°13′36″N 83°9′26″W
- Country: United States
- State: Kentucky
- County: Perry
- Elevation: 906 ft (276 m)
- Time zone: UTC-5 (Eastern (EST))
  - Summer (DST): UTC-4 (EDT)
- GNIS feature ID: 512332

Glomawr is an unincorporated community located in Perry County, Kentucky, United States.

Glomawr is the site of a former coal mine owned by the East Tennessee Coal Co. A post office was established in 1915, and supposedly named for the old Welsh word for high coal.
