= Leatherwood, Kentucky =

Unincorporated community in Kentucky, United States

Leatherwood
- Unincorporated community
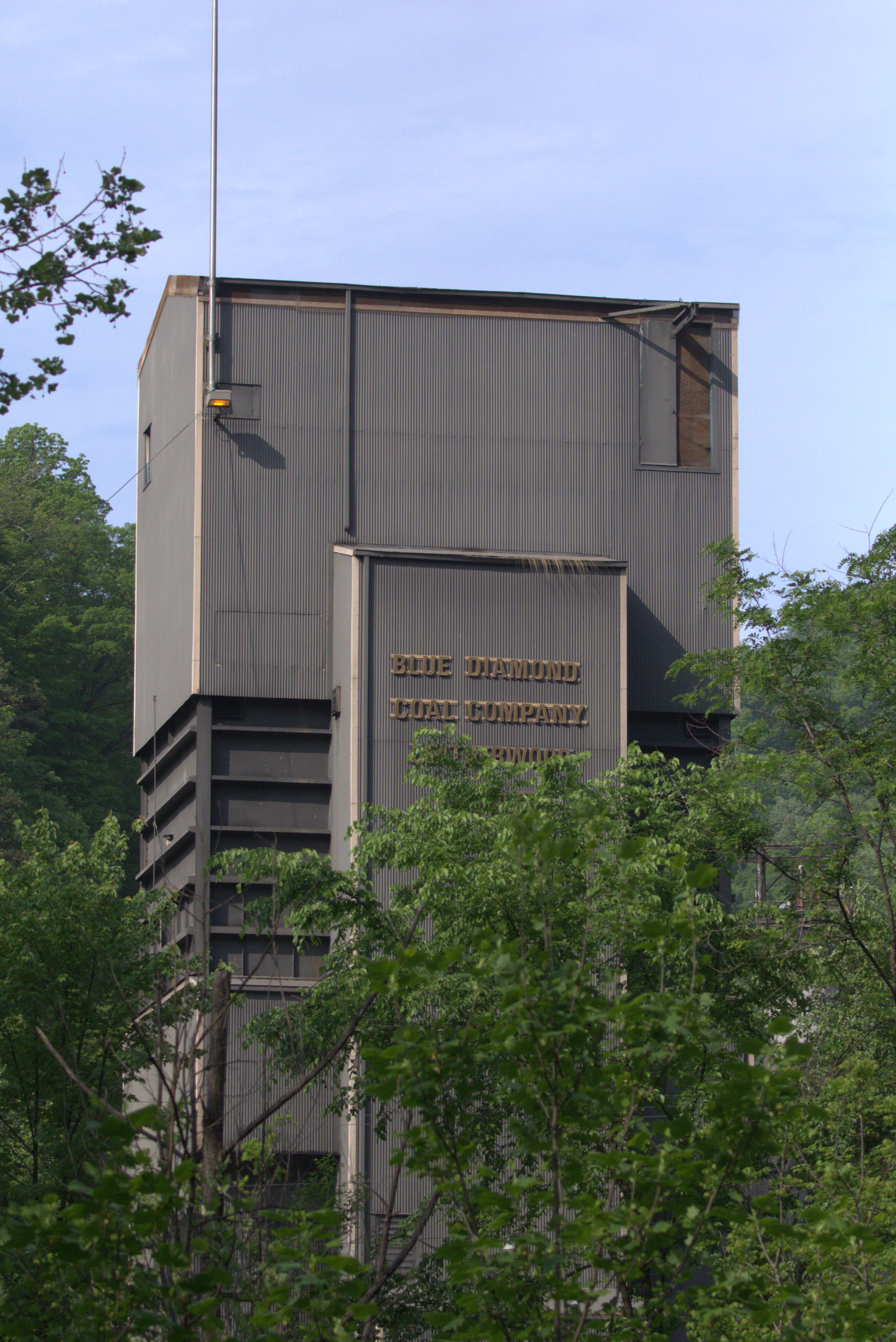
- Coal facility in Leatherwood, Kentucky.

- Location within the state of Kentucky Leatherwood (the United States)
- Coordinates: 37°1′58″N 83°5′2″W
- Country: United States
- State: Kentucky
- County: Perry
- Elevation: 1,719 ft (524 m)
- Time zone: UTC-5 (Eastern (EST))
  - Summer (DST): UTC-4 (EDT)
- GNIS feature ID: 513280

Leatherwood is an unincorporated community within Perry County, Kentucky, United States. At one point, it was called Toner. The post office has been closed.

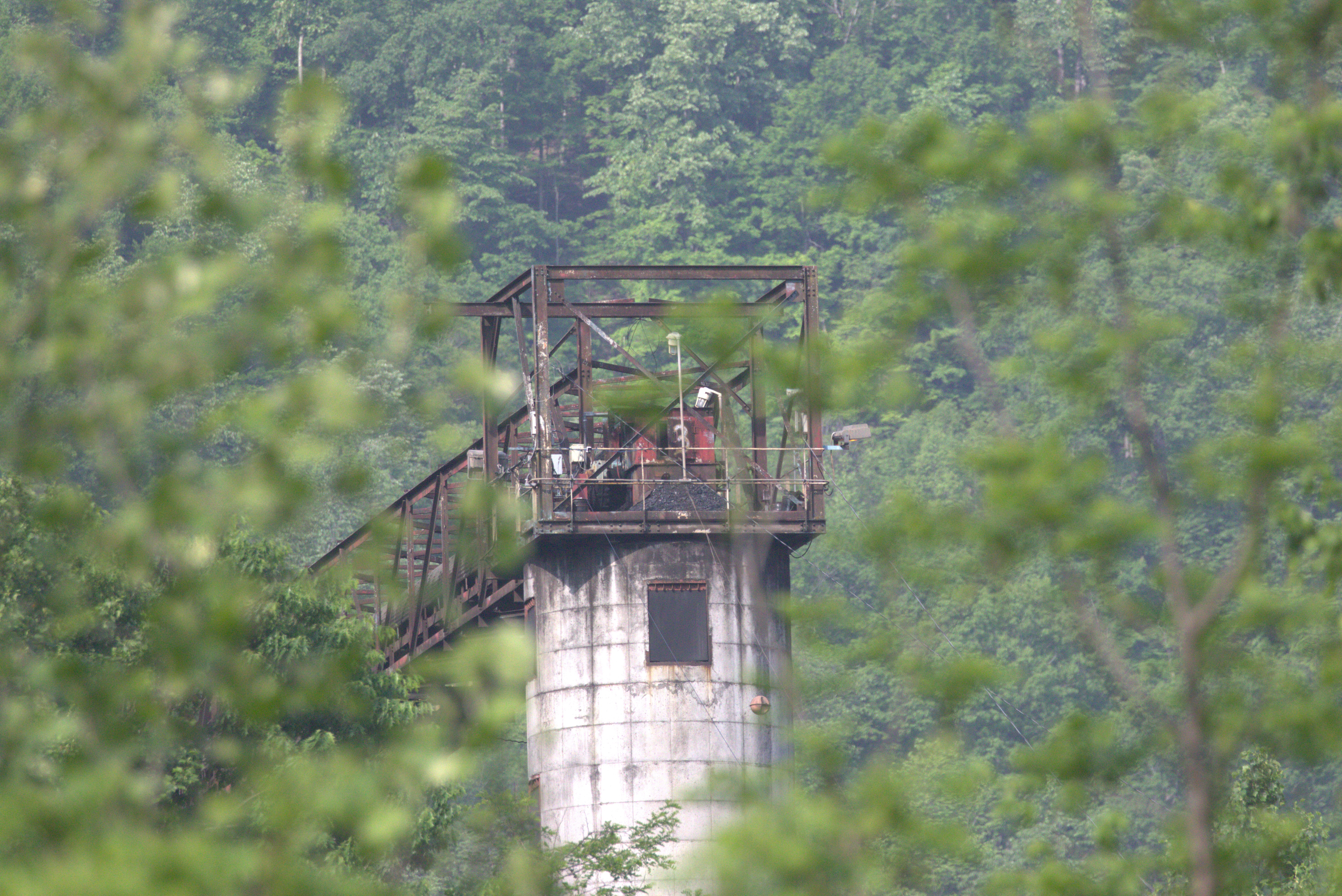
Coal tipple in Leatherwood
