= Chavies, Kentucky =

Unincorporated community in Kentucky, United States

Chavies
- Unincorporated community
- Location within the state of Kentucky Chavies (the United States)
- Coordinates: 37°20′52″N 83°21′23″W
- Country: United States
- State: Kentucky
- County: Perry
- Elevation: 801 ft (244 m)
- Time zone: UTC-5 (Eastern (EST))
  - Summer (DST): UTC-4 (EDT)
- ZIP codes: 41727
- GNIS feature ID: 511319

Chavies is an unincorporated place with a U.S. Post Office located in Perry County, Kentucky, United States.
