= Typo, Kentucky =

Unincorporated community in Kentucky, United States

Typo
- Unincorporated community
- Location within the state of Kentucky Typo (the United States)
- Coordinates: 37°16′40″N 83°15′18″W
- Country: United States
- State: Kentucky
- County: Perry
- Elevation: 1,037 ft (316 m)
- Time zone: UTC-5 (Eastern (EST))
  - Summer (DST): UTC-4 (EDT)
- ZIP codes: 41771
- GNIS feature ID: 516091

Typo is an unincorporated community within Perry County, Kentucky, United States. Its post office has been closed after September 1913.

Typo gained its name from loggers who tied poles to their logs to make rafts at the community. Since the community is located at the mouth of Big Creek into the Kentucky River, loggers made their rafts there before continuing downriver. It has frequently been noted on lists of unusual place names.
