= Perry County, Kentucky =

County in Kentucky, United States

- County
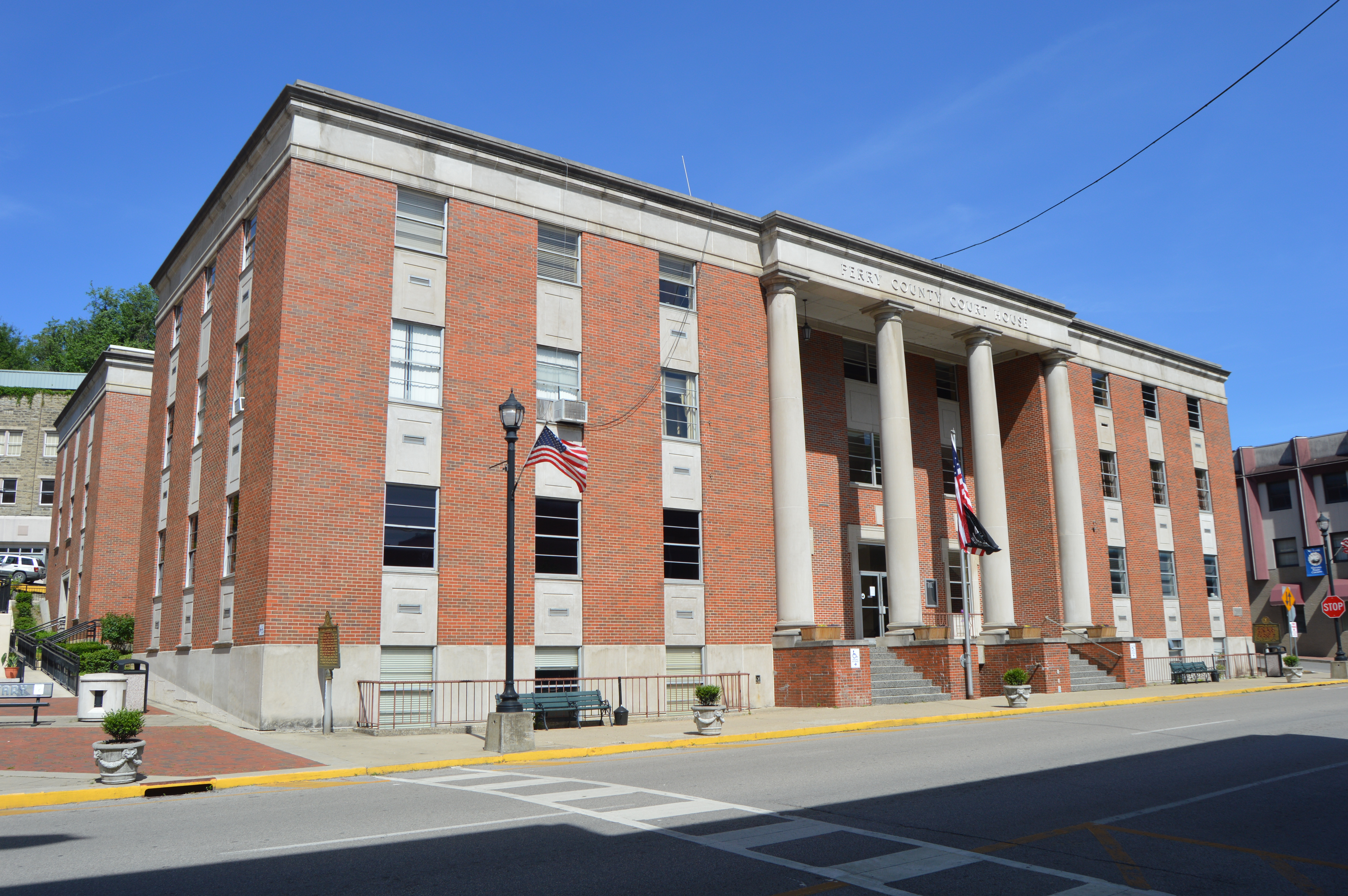
- County courthouse in Hazard

- Flag

- Location within the U.S. state of Kentucky
- Coordinates: 37°14′N 83°14′W
- Country: United States
- State: Kentucky
- Founded: November 2, 1820
- Named for: Oliver Hazard Perry
- Seat: Hazard
- Largest city: Hazard

Government
  - Judge/Executive: Scott Alexander (D)

Area
  - Total: 343 sq mi (890 km^{2})
  - Land: 340 sq mi (880 km^{2})
  - Water: 2.9 sq mi (7.5 km^{2}) 0.9%

Population (2020)
  - Total: 28,473
  - Estimate (2025): 26,555 ▼
  - Density: 84/sq mi (32/km^{2})
- Time zone: UTC−5 (Eastern)
  - Summer (DST): UTC−4 (EDT)
- Congressional district: 5th
- Website: perrycountyky.gov

Perry County is a county in the U.S. state of Kentucky. As of the 2020 census, the population was 28,473. Its county seat is Hazard. The county was founded in 1820. Both the county and county seat are named for Commodore Oliver Hazard Perry, a naval hero in the War of 1812.

== History ==
The area presently bounded by Kentucky state lines was a part of the U.S. State of Virginia, known as Kentucky County when the British colonies separated themselves in the American Revolutionary War. In 1780, Kentucky County was divided into three counties: Fayette, Jefferson, and Lincoln. In 1791, this area was separated into the State of Kentucky; it became effective on June 1, 1792. From that time, the original three counties were divided several times. By 1820, the present Perry County was formed from portions of Floyd and Clay counties. In 1824 the first post office was built on the north fork of the Kentucky River, and was called the Perry Post Office. The first settlers around this area were Elijah Combs, his seven brothers and daughter Jade Miller.

The county's economy has long been based on logging and mining coal.

Perry County is home to Hazard Community and Technical College. It is also home to the Hazard ARH Regional Medical Center, a not-for-profit health system operating 10 hospitals, multi-specialty physician practices, home health agencies, HomeCare Stores and retail pharmacies. It is the largest provider of care and single largest employer in southeastern Kentucky and the third largest private employer in southern West Virginia.

== Geography ==
According to the United States Census Bureau, the county has a total area of 343 square miles (890 km^{2}), of which 340 square miles (880 km^{2}) is land and 2.9 square miles (7.5 km^{2}) (0.9%) is water.

=== Adjacent counties ===
- Breathitt County (north)
- Knott County (northeast)
- Letcher County (southeast)
- Harlan County (south)
- Leslie County (west)
- Clay County (northwest)
- Owsley County (northwest)

== Demographics ==
Historical population
Census	Pop.	Note	%±
1830	3,330		—
1840	3,089		−7.2%
1850	3,092		0.1%
1860	3,950		27.7%
1870	4,274		8.2%
1880	5,607		31.2%
1890	6,331		12.9%
1900	8,276		30.7%
1910	11,255		36.0%
1920	26,042		131.4%
1930	42,186		62.0%
1940	47,828		13.4%
1950	46,566		−2.6%
1960	34,961		−24.9%
1970	26,259		−24.9%
1980	33,763		28.6%
1990	30,283		−10.3%
2000	29,390		−2.9%
2010	28,712		−2.3%
2020	28,473		−0.8%
2025 (est.)	26,555	▼	−6.7%
U.S. Decennial Census; 1790-1960 1900-1990; 1990-2000 2010-2020

=== 2020 census ===
As of the 2020 census, the county had a population of 28,473. The median age was 42.0 years. 21.8% of residents were under the age of 18 and 17.2% of residents were 65 years of age or older. For every 100 females there were 96.4 males, and for every 100 females age 18 and over there were 94.5 males age 18 and over.

The racial makeup of the county was 94.2% White, 1.3% Black or African American, 0.2% American Indian and Alaska Native, 0.9% Asian, 0.0% Native Hawaiian and Pacific Islander, 0.4% from some other race, and 3.0% from two or more races. Hispanic or Latino residents of any race comprised 0.8% of the population.

27.4% of residents lived in urban areas, while 72.6% lived in rural areas.

There were 11,481 households in the county, of which 29.6% had children under the age of 18 living with them and 30.6% had a female householder with no spouse or partner present. About 29.5% of all households were made up of individuals and 11.6% had someone living alone who was 65 years of age or older.

There were 13,213 housing units, of which 13.1% were vacant. Among occupied housing units, 70.8% were owner-occupied and 29.2% were renter-occupied. The homeowner vacancy rate was 1.3% and the rental vacancy rate was 9.1%.

=== 2000 census ===
As of the census of 2000, there were 29,390 people, 11,460 households, and 8,491 families residing in the county. The population density was 86 per square mile (33/km^{2}). There were 12,741 housing units at an average density of 37 per square mile (14/km^{2}). The racial makeup of the county was 97.34% White, 1.64% Black or African American, 0.05% Native American, 0.49% Asian, 0.01% Pacific Islander, 0.04% from other races, and 0.43% from two or more races. 0.52% of the population were Hispanic or Latino of any race.

There were 11,460 households, out of which 34.20% had children under the age of 18 living with them, 56.70% were married couples living together, 13.20% had a female householder with no husband present, and 25.90% were non-families. 23.30% of all households were made up of individuals, and 9.30% had someone living alone who was 65 years of age or older. The average household size was 2.53 and the average family size was 2.98.

In the county, the population was spread out, with 24.40% under the age of 18, 9.10% from 18 to 24, 30.70% from 25 to 44, 24.60% from 45 to 64, and 11.20% who were 65 years of age or older. The median age was 36 years. For every 100 females there were 94.60 males. For every 100 females age 18 and over, there were 91.30 males.

The median income for a household in the county was $22,089, and the median income for a family was $26,718. Males had a median income of $31,702 versus $20,502 for females. The per capita income for the county was $12,224. About 26.10% of families and 29.10% of the population were below the poverty line, including 36.00% of those under age 18 and 20.60% of those age 65 or over.

=== Life expectancy ===
Of 3,142 counties in the United States in 2013, Perry County ranked 3,140 (3rd-from-last) in the life expectancy of both male and female residents. Males in Perry County lived an average of 66.5 years and females lived an average of 73.1 years compared to the national average for longevity of 76.5 for males and 81.2 for females. Moreover, the average longevity in Perry County declined by 0.1 years for males and 2.4 years for females between 1985 and 2013 compared to a national average for the same period of an increased life span of 5.5 years for men and 3.1 years for women. The coal-mining industry, high rates of smoking and obesity and a low level of physical activity appear to be contributing factors to the lowered longevity for both sexes.

== Politics ==
United States presidential election results for Perry County, Kentucky
Year	Republican		Democratic		Third party(ies)	
Year	No.	%	No.	%	No.	%
1880	559	63.74%	318	36.26%	0	0.00%
1884	566	70.22%	236	29.28%	4	0.50%
1888	699	70.11%	296	29.69%	2	0.20%
1892	560	61.14%	346	37.77%	10	1.09%
1896	824	68.84%	340	28.40%	33	2.76%
1900	1,019	68.34%	467	31.32%	5	0.34%
1904	979	68.94%	431	30.35%	10	0.70%
1908	1,274	69.88%	524	28.74%	25	1.37%
1912	1,023	60.25%	560	32.98%	115	6.77%
1916	2,217	69.28%	904	28.25%	79	2.47%
1920	4,345	66.10%	2,203	33.52%	25	0.38%
1924	4,357	59.09%	2,658	36.05%	359	4.87%
1928	6,099	61.44%	3,814	38.42%	14	0.14%
1932	5,240	44.96%	6,393	54.85%	22	0.19%
1936	4,595	40.45%	6,753	59.45%	11	0.10%
1940	4,693	40.59%	6,852	59.26%	18	0.16%
1944	4,333	43.94%	5,527	56.04%	2	0.02%
1948	3,755	39.37%	5,614	58.87%	168	1.76%
1952	5,210	48.41%	5,538	51.46%	14	0.13%
1956	6,591	59.05%	4,545	40.72%	25	0.22%
1960	5,754	53.65%	4,971	46.35%	0	0.00%
1964	3,211	32.28%	6,728	67.64%	8	0.08%
1968	3,993	41.85%	4,562	47.81%	986	10.33%
1972	5,373	59.37%	3,601	39.79%	76	0.84%
1976	4,434	43.83%	5,633	55.68%	49	0.48%
1980	4,226	40.76%	6,031	58.17%	110	1.06%
1984	5,218	49.52%	5,258	49.90%	61	0.58%
1988	5,154	47.85%	5,557	51.59%	61	0.57%
1992	4,128	34.11%	6,619	54.69%	1,356	11.20%
1996	3,382	32.76%	6,015	58.27%	926	8.97%
2000	5,300	48.18%	5,514	50.13%	186	1.69%
2004	6,187	53.08%	5,400	46.33%	68	0.58%
2008	6,762	65.18%	3,444	33.20%	169	1.63%
2012	8,040	78.51%	2,047	19.99%	154	1.50%
2016	8,158	77.17%	2,136	20.20%	278	2.63%
2020	8,129	76.50%	2,356	22.17%	141	1.33%
2024	7,913	79.19%	1,966	19.68%	113	1.13%

=== Elected officials ===
Elected officials as of January 3, 2025
U.S. House	Hal Rogers (R)	KY 5
Ky. Senate	Brandon Smith (R)	30
Ky. House	Chris Fugate (R)	84

== Education ==
=== Public ===
The county has two school districts:

==== Perry County Schools ====
This district covers the entire county except for the city of Hazard.

- Buck School
- East Perry Elementary School
- Perry County Central High School
- Robinson Elementary School
- R.W. Combs Elementary School
- West Perry Elementary School
- Viper Elementary School

==== Hazard Independent Schools ====
This district essentially encompasses the city of Hazard. See this link for a more accurate map of the Hazard district boundary.

- Hazard High School
- Hazard Middle School
- Roy G. Eversole Elementary School

=== Private ===
- Hazard Christian Academy

== Economy ==
=== Coal companies in Perry County ===
- Arch Coal
- James River Coal Company
- TECO Coal

== Media ==
=== Television ===
- WYMT-TV
- WKHA-TV, a satellite station of Kentucky Educational Television

=== Radio ===
- WSGS
- WKIC
- WJMD
- WEKH, a satellite station of WEKU
- WQXY
- WLZD-LP

=== Newspapers ===
- Hazard Herald

== Infrastructure ==
=== Transportation ===
Public transportation is provided by LKLP Community Action Partnership with demand-response service and scheduled service in Hazard, and connecting to Hindman, Hyden, and Whitesburg.

== Communities ==
=== Cities ===
- Buckhorn
- Hazard (county seat)

=== Census-designated places ===
- Combs
- Diablock
- Jeff

=== Other unincorporated places ===
- Allais
- Allock
- Ary
- Avawam
- Beehive
- Blue Diamond
- Boat
- Bonnyman
- Bulan
- Busy
- Butterfly
- Chavies
- Christopher
- Clemons
- Combs
- Cornettsville
- Curly Fork
- Daisy
- Darfork
- Defiance
- Delphia
- Dice
- Doorway
- Dow
- Dunraven
- Dwarf
- Eversole
- Farler
- Fourseam
- Fusonia
- Gays Creek
- Glomawr
- Grigsby
- Happy
- Happy Valley
- Hardburly
- Harveyton
- Hilton
- Hiner
- Hurricane
- Johnson
- Jones
- Kodak
- Krypton
- Lamont
- Leatherwood
- Lead Branch
- Lothair
- Middle Fork
- Miller
- Mudlick
- Napfor
- Olivers
- Otter Creek
- Red Hill
- Rock Fork
- Saul
- Scuddy
- Sixteen
- Slemp
- Stacy
- Tenmile
- Tilford
- Tribbey
- Typo
- Upper Pidgeonroost
- Vicco (part)
- Viper
- Wentz
- Whitaker
- Whitsett
- Woodland Park
- Yerkes

=== Ghost town ===
- Upper Squabble

== Notable residents ==
- Shelby Lee Adams - American photographer
- Abraham Childers - American politician and pioneer
- Chester Jones - American businessman, educator, and politician
- Jean Ritchie - Folk singer

== See also ==
- National Register of Historic Places listings in Perry County, Kentucky
- Robinson Forest
