= U.S. Route 460 in Kentucky =

Segment of American highway

U.S. Route 460
- US 460 highlighted in red

Route information
- Maintained by KYTC
- Length: 190 mi (310 km)

Major junctions
- West end: US 60 / US 421 in Frankfort
- US 25 in Georgetown; US 62 in Georgetown; I-75 in Georgetown; US 27 / US 68 in Paris; I-64 in Mt. Sterling; KY 7 in West Liberty and Salyersville; US 23 by Paintsville; KY 80 in Watergap; US 23 / US 119 by Pikeville; KY 80 in Belcher
- East end: US 460 at the Virginia state line

Location
- Country: United States
- State: Kentucky
- Counties: Franklin, Scott, Bourbon, Montgomery, Menifee, Morgan, Magoffin, Johnson, Floyd, Pike

Highway system
- United States Numbered Highway System; List; Special; Divided; Kentucky State Highway System; Interstate; US; State; Parkways
← KY 459	→ KY 461

U.S. Route 460 (US 460) is a part of the U.S. Highway System that travels from Frankfort, Kentucky, to Norfolk, Virginia. In the U.S. state of Kentucky, US 460 extends from Frankfort, Kentucky and ends at the Virginia state line.

== Route description ==
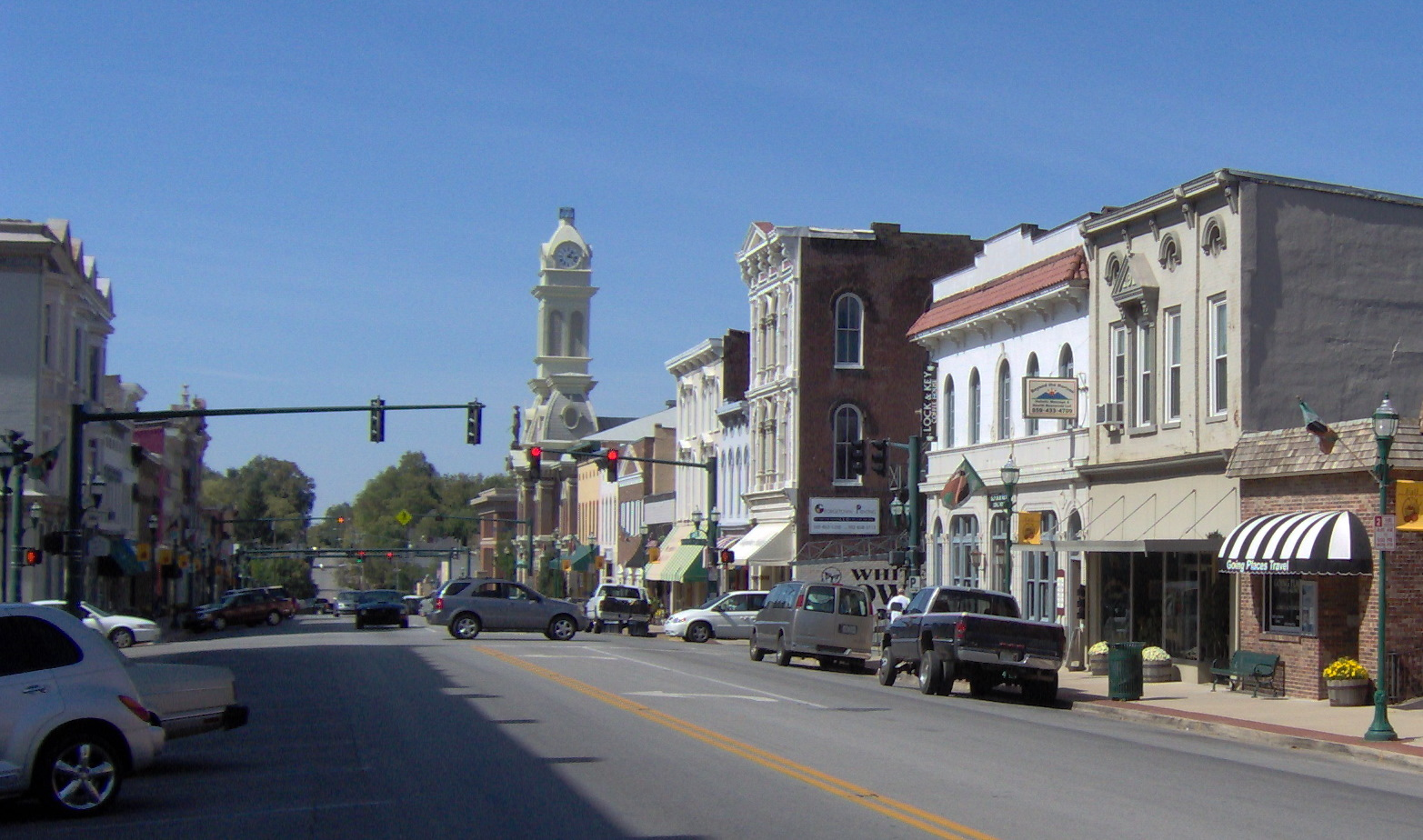
U. S. Route 460 runs through downtown Georgetown, Kentucky.

US 460 now begins when it splits from US 60 a few miles east of downtown Frankfort. It is a winding two-lane highway with no shoulders and intersects US 62 and I-75 at Georgetown. It proceeds to Paris, where it serves as the town's "Main Street" and intersects US 27 and US 68.

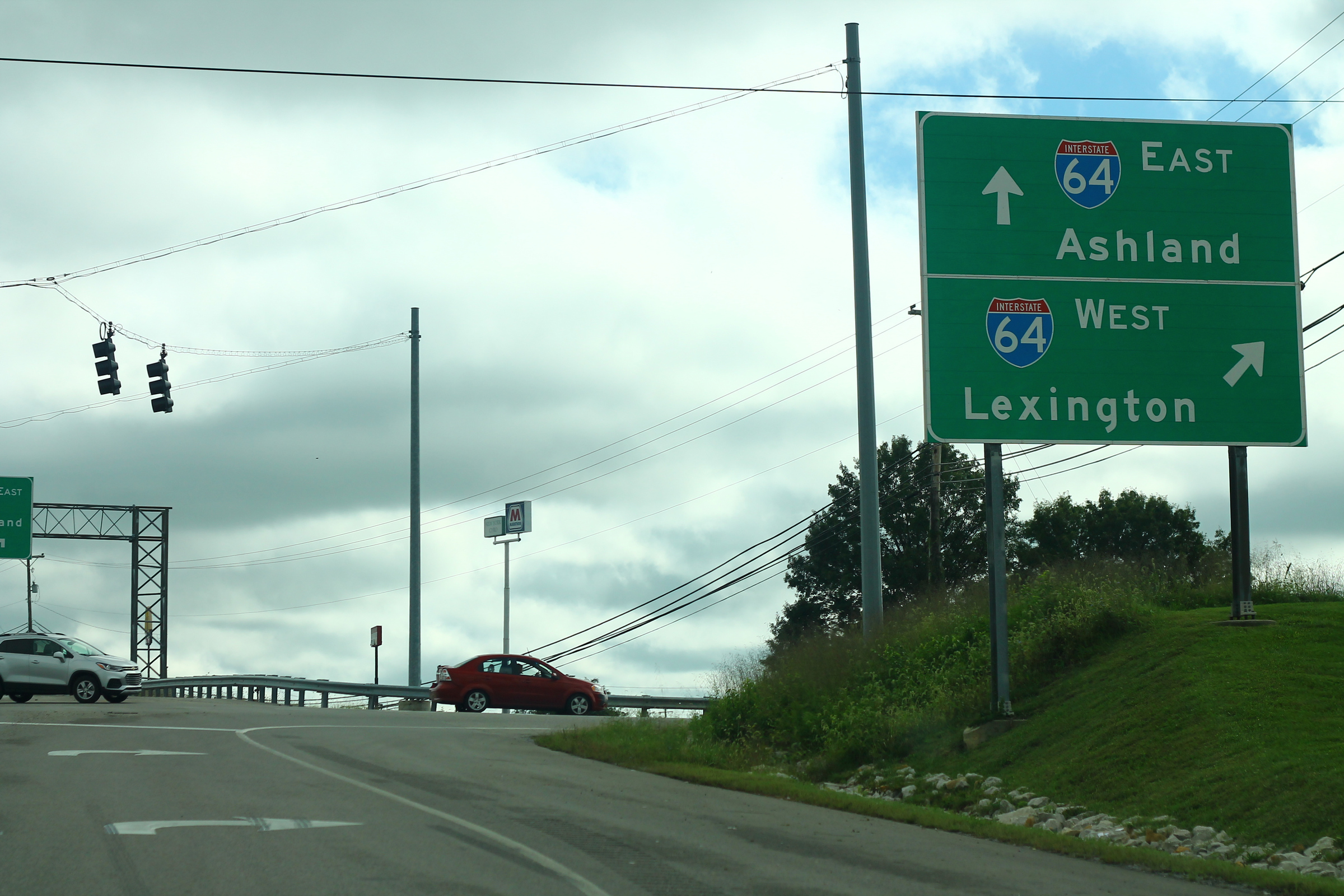
US 460 and KY 11 at I-64

The next major intersection is with I-64 in Mount Sterling. It proceeds through Frenchburg and West Liberty. In Salyersville, the Mountain Parkway ends by merging onto it. It is a 3-lane highway for 14 miles and then it merges with US 23 in Paintsville. US 460 East follows US-23 South through Prestonsburg and Pikeville. The route enters the southwestern part of Virginia.

== Major intersections ==
County	Location	mi	km	Destinations	Notes
Franklin	Frankfort	0.000	0.000	US 60 / US 421 (East Main Street / Versailles Road) to I-64 – Versailles, Lexington, Downtown Frankfort, Kentucky State University	Western terminus
Franklin	Frankfort	0.965	1.553	KY 2822 north (Steadmantown Road)	Southern terminus of KY 2822
Franklin		2.310	3.718	KY 1689 north (Switzer Road)	Southern terminus of KY 1689
Franklin	Woodlake	4.790	7.709	KY 1262 north (Woodlake Road) – Switzer, Stamping Ground	Southern terminus of KY 1262
Franklin		5.121	8.241	KY 1685 south (Bedford Pike)	Northern terminus of KY 1685
Scott		7.563	12.171	KY 1973 south (Ironworks Road)	Northern terminus of KY 1973
Scott		13.169	21.193	KY 227 north (Stamping Ground Road)	Southern terminus of KY 227
Scott	Georgetown	13.694	22.038	US 460 Byp. east (McLelland Circle) / KY 1143 north	Western end of Georgetown bypass route; southern terminus of KY 1143
Scott	Georgetown	15.726	25.309	US 25 (Broadway Street)	
Scott	Georgetown	16.026	25.791	Memorial Drive - Georgetown College	
Scott	Georgetown	16.934	27.253	US 62 west / US 460 Byp. (McLelland Circle)	Eastern end of Georgetown bypass route
Scott	Georgetown	17.178	27.645	I-75 south – Lexington	Southbound entrance and northbound exit; I-75 exit 125
Scott	Georgetown	17.335	27.898	KY 2906 north (Connector Road) to I-75 north	Southern terminus of KY 2906
Scott		20.256	32.599	KY 922 (Newtown Pike)	
Scott		22.477	36.173	Airport Road - Georgetown-Scott County Airport	
Bourbon	Centerville	25.166	40.501	KY 353 (Russell Cave Road) – Lexington, Cynthiana	
Bourbon		27.296	43.929	KY 1876 south (Elizabeth Station Road)	Western end of KY 1876 concurrency
Bourbon		27.336	43.993	KY 1876 north (Clay Kisser Road)	Eastern end of KY 1876 concurrency
Bourbon	Paris	31.468	50.643	US 27 / US 68 (Martin Luther King, Jr. Boulevard)	Access to Bourbon Community Hospital
Bourbon	Paris	32.875	52.907	US 68 Bus. west (High Street)	
Bourbon	Paris	32.922	52.983	US 68 Bus. east (Main Street)	Western end of US 68 Business concurrency
Bourbon	Paris	33.224	53.469	US 68 Bus. west / US 460 west (Bank Row Street)	End of one-way east/west split
Bourbon	Paris	34.018	54.747	US 68 Bus. (Millersburg Road) – Maysville	Eastern end of US 68 Business concurrency; Bourbon County Hospital directly west of intersection
Bourbon		35.231	56.699	KY 537 east (Crane Ridge Road)	Western terminus of KY 537
Bourbon		43.067	69.310	KY 3364 south (Stoney Point Road)	Western end of KY 3364 concurrency
Bourbon	North Middletown	43.719	70.359	KY 57 south (Thatchers Mill Road) / KY 3364 north (College Street)	Western end of KY 57 concurrency; eastern end of KY 3364 concurrency
Bourbon	North Middletown	43.926	70.692	KY 57 north (Levy Road)	Eastern end of KY 57 concurrency
Montgomery		48.793	78.525	KY 3362 east (Aarons Run Road)	Western terminus of KY 3362
Montgomery		50.432	81.162	KY 713 east (Prewit-Grassy Creek Road)	Western terminus of KY 713
Montgomery	Mount Sterling	54.117	87.093	KY 11 north (Maysville Road) – Maysville	Western end of KY 11 concurrency
Montgomery	Mount Sterling	54.780– 54.902	88.160– 88.356	I-64 – Lexington, Ashland	I-64 exit 110
Montgomery	Mount Sterling	55.098	88.672	KY 686 east (Indian Mound Drive)	Western terminus of KY 686; access to Mount Sterling-Montgomery County Airport
Montgomery	Mount Sterling	55.720	89.673	KY 1991 north (Hinkston Place)	Southern terminus of KY 1991
Montgomery	Mount Sterling	56.350	90.687	US 60 east (East Main Street)	Western end of US 60 concurrency
Montgomery	Mount Sterling	56.421	90.801	US 60 west (West Main Street)	Eastern end of US 60 concurrency
Montgomery	Mount Sterling	56.846	91.485	KY 11 south (Levee Road)	Eastern end of KY 11 concurrency
Montgomery	Mount Sterling	57.572	92.653	KY 686 (Indian Mound Drive)	
Montgomery		59.293	95.423	KY 646 north (Whitaker Lane)	Western end of KY 646 concurrency
Montgomery		59.362	95.534	KY 646 south (Tonkin Road)	Eastern end of KY 646 concurrency
Montgomery	Jeffersonville	64.120	103.191	KY 213 north (Bedford Road)	Western end of KY 213 concurrency
Montgomery	Jeffersonville	64.281	103.450	KY 213 to Mountain Parkway	Eastern end of KY 213 concurrency
Montgomery	Jeffersonville	64.996	104.601	KY 599 south	Northern terminus of KY 599
Montgomery	Jeffersonville	65.556	105.502	KY 1050 south	Northern terminus of KY 1050
Menifee	Means	69.022	111.080	KY 713 east (Hawkins Branch Road)	Western end of KY 713 concurrency
Menifee	Means	69.539	111.912	KY 713 west (Hope Means Road)	Eastern end of KY 713 concurrency
Menifee	Frenchburg	76.456	123.044	KY 713 west (Indian Creek Road)	Eastern terminus of KY 713
Menifee	Frenchburg	77.676	125.007	KY 36 north	Southern terminus of KY 36
Menifee	Frenchburg	79.155	127.388	KY 3338 south (McCausey Ridge Road)	Northern terminus of KY 3338
Menifee	Mariba	81.578	131.287	KY 77 south (Tarr Ridge Road) / KY 1242 north (Kendrick Ridge Road)	Northern terminus of KY 77; southern terminus of KY 1242
Menifee		83.562	134.480	KY 746 south (Trimble Bend Road)	Northern terminus of KY 746
Menifee	Denniston	84.154	135.433	KY 1240 north (Betty Gap Ridge Road)	Southern terminus of KY 1240
Menifee	Wellington	85.598	137.757	KY 3342 north (Byrd Ridge Road)	Southern terminus of KY 3342
Menifee	Wellington	85.777	138.045	KY 1569 south	Northern terminus of KY 1569
Menifee		86.313	138.907	KY 1693 north (Dan Ridge Road)	Southern terminus of KY 1693
Menifee		87.258	140.428	KY 1196 south	Northern terminus of KY 1196
Morgan		88.184	141.918	KY 882	Northern Terminus of KY 882
Morgan	Ezel	90.517	145.673	KY 2497 south (Meetinghouse Branch Road)	Northern terminus of KY 2497
Morgan		90.566	145.752	KY 2496 east (Liberty Street)	Western terminus of KY 2496
Morgan		90.773	146.085	KY 2497 north (Walnut Street)	Southern terminus of KY 2497
Morgan		90.961	146.388	KY 1010 south	Northern terminus of KY 1010
Morgan		91.285	146.909	KY 772 north	Southern terminus of KY 772
Morgan		92.602	149.028	KY 946 west	Eastern terminus of KY 946
Morgan	Mize	96.339	155.043	KY 203 south	Northern terminus of KY 203
Morgan	Grassy Creek	98.184	158.012	KY 705 (Grassy Creek Road)	
Morgan		100.512	161.758	KY 205 south – Jackson, Lee City	Northern terminus of KY 205
Morgan	Index	102.844	165.511	KY 191 west / KY 2498 north	Eastern terminus of KY 191; southern terminus of KY 2498
Morgan	West Liberty	104.587	168.316	KY 2498 south	Northern terminus of KY 2498
Morgan	West Liberty	105.051	169.063	KY 2495 north (Court Street)	Southern terminus of KY 2495
Morgan	West Liberty	105.170	169.255	KY 7 north (Main Street)	Western end of KY 7 concurrency
Morgan	West Liberty	105.232	169.354	KY 2495 south (Broadway Street)	Northern terminus of KY 2495
Morgan	West Liberty	105.762	170.207	KY 2494 west (Glenn Avenue)	Eastern terminus of KY 2494
Morgan	West Liberty	106.031	170.640	KY 2499 south (Dogwood Lane)	Northern terminus of KY 2499
Morgan	West Liberty	106.151	170.833	KY 172 east (Cane Creek Road) – Crockett, Patoker Branch	Western terminsu of KY 172
Morgan		111.133	178.851	KY 364 south (Rockhouse Creek Road)	Northern terminus of KY 364
Morgan		113.774	183.102	KY 1000 south	Northern terminus of KY 1000
Morgan		114.985	185.050	KY 1081 east	Western terminus of KY 1081
Magoffin	Wonnie	118.047	189.978	KY 1081 east	Western end of KY 1081 concurrency
Magoffin	Edna	119.841	192.865	KY 1081 west	Eastern end of KY 1081 concurrency
Magoffin		120.677	194.211	KY 134 west – Adele	Eastern terminus of KY 134
Magoffin		125.082	201.300	KY 2019 north (Elk Creek Road)	Southern terminus of KY 2019
Magoffin		125.997	202.773	KY 30 west (Middle Fork Road) to Mountain Parkway	Eastern terminus of KY 30
Magoffin	Salyersville	127.300	204.869	KY 7 south (Gardner Trail) to Mountain Parkway	Northern terminus of KY 7
Magoffin	Salyersville	127.603	205.357	KY 3048 west (Old Kentucky 114) / Mountain Parkway west – Lexington, Campton	Eastern terminus of KY 3048; eastern terminus of Mountain Parkway
Magoffin	Salyersville	130.319	209.728	KY 1888 east (Burning Fork Road) / KY 1415 east (Rockhouse Fork Road)	Western terminus of KY 1888; western terminus of KY 1415
Magoffin		130.768	210.451	KY 114 east – Prestonsburg, Pikeville	Western terminus of KY 114
Magoffin		131.623	211.827	KY 1415 (Rockhouse Fork Road)	
Magoffin		132.926	213.924	KY 2020 west	Eastern terminus of KY 2020
Johnson		136.852	220.242	KY 825 – Oil Springs	
Johnson		138.873	223.494	KY 580 east	Western terminus of KY 580
Johnson		143.605	231.110	KY 2039 south	Northern terminus of KY 2039
Johnson	Paintsville	144.183	232.040	US 23 south	Western end of US 23 concurrency
Johnson	Paintsville	144.377	232.352	KY 40 to US 23 north – Paintsville, Ashland, Staffordsville, Paintsville Lake State Park	Access to US 23 north via KY 40
Johnson	Paintsville	147.013	236.594	KY 825	
Johnson	Paintsville	148.912	239.651	KY 1428 north	Southern terminus of KY 1428
Johnson	Paintsville	149.333	240.328	KY 1750 south	Northern terminus of KY 1750
Johnson	East Point	151.183	243.305	KY 1100	
Floyd		152.860	246.004	KY 3 north / KY 1100 north (Bays Branch Road)	Southern terminus of KY 3; western end of KY 1100 concurrency
Floyd		153.234	246.606	KY 1100 south	Northern terminus of KY 1100
Floyd		155.500	250.253	KY 1428 south (Stonewall Road) – Prestonsburg	Northern terminus of KY 1428
Floyd		155.816	250.762	KY 1427 west (Abbott Creek Road)	Eastern terminus of KY 1427
Floyd	Prestonsburg	157.564	253.575	KY 114 – Prestonsburg, Lexington	Interchange
Floyd		159.820	257.205	KY 3384 north (Town Branch Road)	Southern terminus of KY 3384
Floyd	Watergap	160.356	258.068	KY 80 west / KY 302 north – Martin, Hazard, Jenny Wiley State Resort Park, Hindman	Interchange; western end of KY 80 concurrency
Floyd	Allen	162.767	261.948	KY 1428	
Floyd		164.167	264.201	KY 1426 east	Western terminus of KY 1426
Floyd	Betsy Layne	170.882	275.008	KY 2557 west (Justell Bridge Road)	Eastern terminus of KY 2557
Floyd	Harold	172.436	277.509	KY 680 west – Mud Creek, Grethel, Teaberry, Ligon	Eastern terminus of KY 680
Pike		173.327	278.943	KY 1384 east (Hurricane Road) – Owsley, Boldman	Western terminus of KY 1384
Pike		174.527	280.874	KY 3218 east (Senator Kelsey E Friend Boulevard)	Western terminus of KY 3218; access to Pike County Airport
Pike		176.669	284.321	KY 2061 north (Cowpen Road)	Southern terminus of KY 2061
Pike	Pikeville	178.755	287.678	KY 3227 east (Stone Coal Road)	Western terminus of KY 3227
Pike	Pikeville	179.842	289.428	US 119 north – Meta, Belfry, Williamson	Western end of US 119 concurrency
Pike	Pikeville	180.524	290.525	KY 3495 south (North Mayo Trail) to US 23 north	Northern terminus of KY 3495
Pike	Pikeville	181.308	291.787	KY 1460 south to US 23 north	Northern terminus of KY 1460
Pike	Pikeville	181.552	292.180	KY 1384 (Cedar Creek Road / Hambley Boulevard) – Pikeville, University of Pikeville	Interchange; exit 24
Pike	Pikeville	182.251	293.305	KY 1426 west – Downtown Pikeville, Hatfield-McCoy feud Historic Site, Eastern Kentucky Exposition Center	Interchange; exit 23; western end of KY 1426 concurrency; access to Pikeville Medical Center
Pike	Pikeville	183.070	294.623	KY 3496 north (South Mayo Trail)	Southern terminus of KY 3496
Pike	Pikeville	183.192	294.819	KY 1426 east (Cedar Hills Road)	Eastern end of KY 1426 concurrency
Pike	Pikeville	187.078	301.073	US 23 south / US 119 south	Eastern end of US 23 and US 119 concurrency; KY 80 follows US 460
Pike	Shelbiana	188.462	303.300	KY 122 west (Collins Highway)	Eastern terminus of KY 122
Pike		189.756	305.383	KY 1460 north (Red Creek Road)	Southern terminus of KY 1460
Pike		191.356	307.958	KY 3226 west (Greasy Creek Road)	Eastern terminus of KY 3226
Pike		192.174	309.274	KY 1441 north (Fishtrap Road) – Fishtrap	Southern terminus of KY 1441
Pike		192.992	310.591	KY 1789 east	Western terminus of KY 1789
Pike		196.493	316.225	KY 195 south – Lookout, Hellier	Northern terminus of KY 195
Pike	Belcher	201.432	324.173	KY 80 east – Elkhorn City, Breaks VA	Eastern end of KY 80 concurrency
Pike		206.606	332.500	KY 1373 south (Beaver Creek Road)	Western end of KY 1373 concurrency
Pike		206.824	332.851	KY 1373 north	Eastern end of KY 1373 concurrency
Pike	Mouthcard	209.539	337.220	KY 1499 north	Southern terminus of KY 1499
Pike		212.403	341.829	US 460 east – Grundy, Claypool Hill, Bluefield	Continuation into Virginia
1.000 mi = 1.609 km; 1.000 km = 0.621 mi: Concurrency terminus; Incomplete access

U.S. Route 460
Previous state: Terminus	Kentucky	Next state: Virginia
