= Kentucky Route 205 =

State highway in Kentucky, United States

Kentucky Route 205
- KY 205 highlighted in red

Route information
- Maintained by KYTC
- Length: 29.3 mi (47.2 km)

Major junctions
- South end: KY 30 in Jackson
- KY 15 north of Jackson; KY 15 / KY 1812 in Vancleve; Mountain Parkway / KY 191 in Helechawa
- North end: US 460 near Greear

Location
- Country: United States
- State: Kentucky
- Counties: Breathitt, Wolfe, Morgan

Highway system
- Kentucky State Highway System; Interstate; US; State; Parkways
| ← KY 203 | → KY 206 |

Kentucky Route 205 (KY 205) is a 29-mile-long (47 km) state highway in the U.S. state of Kentucky. The highway connects mostly rural areas of Breathitt, Wolfe, and Morgan counties with Jackson, Vancleve, and Helechawa.

== Route description ==
=== Breathitt County ===
KY 205 begins at an intersection with KY 30 in Jackson, within Breathitt County. The highway parallels the North Fork Kentucky River. It travels to the north-northwest, leaves Jackson, crosses over Shacks Branch, and intersects the southern terminus of KY 3193. It curves to the east-northeast, leaving the river. Then, it curves to the northeast and intersects KY 15. The two highways travel concurrently to the northwest, rejoining the river along the way. When they split, KY 205 travels to the southwest and curves to the west-northwest and travels through Fivemile. The highway curves to the north and intersects the northern terminus of KY 3193. It crosses over Frozen Boone Fork immediately before an intersection with the northern terminus of KY 541 (Mt. Carmel Road). KY 205 heads to the northeast, paralleling the fork, and has an interchange with KY 15/KY 1812. Here, KY 205 and KY 1812 begin a concurrency. They cross over Little Frozen Creek, travel through Wilhurst, and cross Boone Fork before they split. KY 205 heads to the northeast and crosses over the fork. It then crosses over the fork two more times and travels through Simpson. The highway curve to the northeast and enters Wolfe County.

=== Wolfe County ===
KY 205 begins by paralleling Rose Fork. It then crosses over the fork six times and Red River before it enters Lee City. There, it intersects the northern terminus of KY 1094. KY 205 parallels the river out of Lee City. It curves to the northeast and enters Helechawa, where it crosses State Road Fork, has an interchange with the Mountain Parkway, and begins a concurrency with KY 191. The two highways head to the northwest and curve to the north-northwest, where they split. KY 205 heads to the east-northeast and enters Morgan County.

=== Morgan County ===
KY 205 enters Sellars, where it crosses over Sellars Fork and curves to the north-northwest. The highway begins paralleling the fork and again crosses it. KY 205 intersects the western terminus of KY 844 (Salem Church Road). It curves to the east-northeast and crosses the fork again. Right after it crosses over Payton Fork, it intersects KY 705 (Walters Branch Road/Grassy Creek Road). It heads to the northeast and curves to the north-northeast and meets its northern terminus, an intersection with U.S. Route 460 (US 460).

== Major intersections ==
| County | Location | mi | km | Destinations | Notes |
|---|---|---|---|---|---|
| Breathitt | Jackson | 0.0 | 0.0 | KY 30 – Booneville, Quicksand | Southern terminus |
| Breathitt | | 0.7 | 1.1 | KY 3193 north – Wolverine | Southern terminus of KY 3193 |
| Breathitt | | 2.2 | 3.5 | KY 15 south – Jackson | Southern end of KY 15 concurrency |
| Breathitt | | 4.0 | 6.4 | KY 15 north – Campton | Northern end of KY 15 concurrency |
| Breathitt | | 5.4 | 8.7 | KY 3193 south | Northern terminus of KY 3193 |
| Breathitt | | 5.9 | 9.5 | KY 541 south (Mt. Carmel Road) | Northern terminus of KY 541 |
| Breathitt | Vancleve | 7.6 | 12.2 | KY 15 / KY 1812 south | Interchange; southern end of KY 1812 concurrency |
| Breathitt | | 9.5 | 15.3 | KY 1812 north | Northern end of KY 1812 concurrency |
| Wolfe | Lee City | 18.3 | 29.5 | KY 1094 south | Northern terminus of KY 1094 |
| Wolfe | Helechawa | 20.4 | 32.8 | Mountain Parkway / KY 191 east – Salyersville, Campton, West Liberty | Mountain Parkway exit 57; southern end of KY 191 concurrency |
| Wolfe | | 22.0 | 35.4 | KY 191 west – Hazel Green | Northern end of KY 191 concurrency |
| Morgan | | 24.6 | 39.6 | KY 844 east (Salem Church Road) | Western end of KY 844 |
| Morgan | | 26.5 | 42.6 | KY 705 (Walters Branch Road/Grassy Creek Road) | |
| Morgan | | 29.3 | 47.2 | US 460 – Frenchburg, West Liberty | Northern terminus |
1.000 mi = 1.609 km; 1.000 km = 0.621 mi: Concurrency terminus
