= Mountain Parkway =

Highway in Kentucky, U.S.

Mountain Parkway
- Mountain Parkway highlighted in red

Route information
- Maintained by KYTC
- Length: 75.627 mi (121.710 km)

Major junctions
- West end: I-64 near Winchester
- East end: US 460 near Salyersville

Location
- Country: United States
- State: Kentucky
- Counties: Clark, Powell, Wolfe, Morgan, Magoffin

Highway system
- Kentucky State Highway System; Interstate; US; State; Parkways

The Bert T. Combs Mountain Parkway, commonly known as the Mountain Parkway, is a freeway in eastern Kentucky. The route runs from Interstate 64 (I-64) just east of Winchester southeast for 75.6 miles (121.7 km) to a junction with U.S. Route 460 (US 460) near Salyersville. As of August 2026, the entire stretch of highway is a four-lane freeway with only minor design standard differences from an Interstate Highway with a speed limit of 70 mph from Winchester to Salyersville. Construction began in August 2025 to expand the Mountain Parkway a final 13 miles from Salyersville to Kentucky Route 404 (KY 404) in Prestonsburg.

== History ==
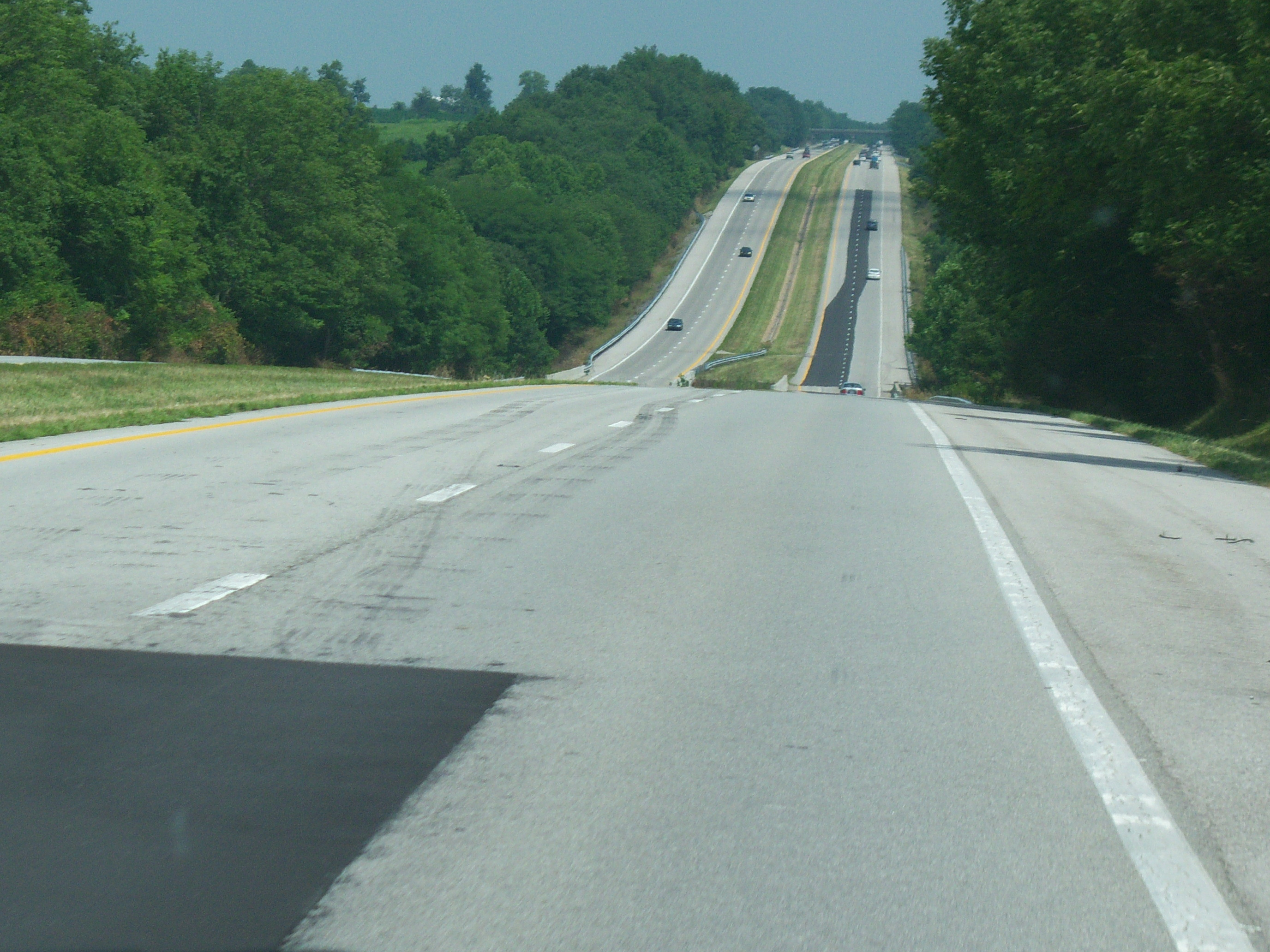
The entire parkway is four lanes wide now

The Mountain Parkway was built in the early 1960s and opened in January 1963 as Kentucky's second toll road. The route was originally signed only as the "Mountain Parkway".

In the late 1970s, the road was officially renamed the Bert T. Combs Parkway. This was in honor of the governor from the mountains who spearheaded construction of the highway. Auxiliary plates were added above the circular Mountain Parkway signs to mark the designation.

As with all of Kentucky's toll roads, the tolls were removed as the construction bonds were paid off. Tolls were removed from the four-lane section in 1985, and the road became fully free in 1986 when the remaining tolls were removed from the two-lane section.

The Mountain Parkway used a circular shield until the 2000s.

The route was designated Kentucky Route 114 (KY 114) in April 1985. In August, the road was redesignated KY 402. Later, in February 1990, the parkway was designated Kentucky Route 9000 from its western terminus to KY 15 Spur near Campton and Kentucky Route 9009 from KY 15 Spur to the parkway's eastern terminus. Both designations are unsigned.

== Future ==
On January 15, 2014, then-Governor Steve Beshear announced plans to extend the parkway to US 23 in Prestonsburg, which would include widening the highway to four lanes for its entire length. The project, which would cost more than $750 million and requires approval by the Kentucky General Assembly, would run through 2020, and is expected to lead to the reinstatement of tolls on the highway. On July 26, 2019, then-Governor Matt Bevin announced a $70M plan to expand the parkway. On October 16, 2024, current Governor Andy Beshear announced the state received a $116.3M federal grant to speed up the expansion. Currently, Kentucky is planning to make $400 million in improvements to extend the parkway.

== Exit list ==
County	Location	mi	km	Exit	Destinations	Notes
Clark	Winchester	0.000	0.000		I-64 west – Lexington, Winchester	Westbound exit and eastbound entrance; western terminus; I-64 exit 98
Clark		10.380	16.705	10	KY 974 – Mt. Sterling, Winchester	Opened to traffic October 25, 2014
Powell	Clay City	16.412	26.413	16	KY 15 south / KY 82 – Clay City, Irvine	Northern terminus of KY 82
Powell	Clay City	18.471	29.726	18	KY 1057 – Clay City	
Powell	Stanton	22.307	35.900	22	KY 213 – Stanton, Irvine	
Powell	Slade	32.802	52.790	33	KY 11 – Beattyville, Slade	To Natural Bridge State Resort Park
Wolfe	Pine Ridge	40.468	65.127	40	KY 15 / KY 715 – Beattyville, Pine Ridge, Rogers	First eastbound exit in Eastern Kentucky Coal Field or Cumberland Plateau
Wolfe	Campton	42.105	67.761	42	KY 1653 (Quillins Chapel Road)	
Wolfe	Campton	42.759	68.814	43	KY 15 Spur to KY 15 – Campton, Jackson, Hazard, Whitesburg	No westbound exit; to Buckhorn Lake State Resort Park and Hal Rogers Parkway
Wolfe	Campton	43.104	69.369	Eastern terminus of Mountain Parkway (KY 9000); western terminus of Mountain Parkway Extension (KY 9009)		
Wolfe		46.223	74.389	46	KY 191 – Campton	Was a westbound exit and eastbound entrance, rebuilt into a full interchange.
Wolfe		53.284	85.752	53	KY 1010 – Hazel Green	
Wolfe		57.188	92.035	57	KY 205 to KY 191 – West Liberty, Jackson	
Morgan		60.402	97.208	60	KY 134 to KY 191	Was a westbound exit and eastbound entrance; rebuilt into a full interchange
Magoffin		67.7	109.0	68	KY 1257 (Cow Creek Road)	Interchange opened October 3, 2024
Magoffin		70.2	113.0	70	KY 3050 (Gifford Road)	
Magoffin		71.740	115.454	72	KY 30	
Magoffin	Salyersville	74.772	120.334	75	KY 7 to US 460 west – Salyersville	
Magoffin	Salyersville	75.627	121.710		US 460 / KY 3048	At-grade intersection and eastern terminus of extension
1.000 mi = 1.609 km; 1.000 km = 0.621 mi: Incomplete access; Route transition
