= National Register of Historic Places listings in Morgan County, Kentucky =

Location of Morgan County in Kentucky

This is a list of the National Register of Historic Places listings in Morgan County, Kentucky.

It is intended to be a complete list of the properties on the National Register of Historic Places in Morgan County, Kentucky, United States. The locations of National Register properties for which the latitude and longitude coordinates are included below, may be seen on a map.

There are nine properties listed on the National Register in the county.

This National Park Service list is complete through NPS recent listings posted March 21, 2025.

== Current listings ==
	Name on the Register	Image	Date listed	Location	City or town	Description
1	Ray Burchwell Archeological Site		July 30, 1975 (#75000808)	Address Restricted	Redbush	
2	Christian Church of West Liberty	Christian Church of West Liberty	August 5, 2010 (#10000529)	304 Prestonsburg St. 37°55′17″N 83°15′31″W	West Liberty	Church was destroyed in a 2012 tornado.
3	Judge John E. Cooper House	Judge John E. Cooper House	August 1, 1996 (#96000824)	709 N. Main St. 37°55′26″N 83°15′34″W	West Liberty	
4	Gar Ferguson Site		July 24, 1975 (#75000809)	Address Restricted	Redbush	
5	Lonnie Hill Site		August 22, 1975 (#75000811)	Address Restricted	Redbush	
6	Ray Hill Archeological Site		July 30, 1975 (#75000810)	Address Restricted	Redbush	
7	Morgan County Courthouse	Morgan County Courthouse	July 19, 1976 (#76000929)	Main St. 37°55′15″N 83°15′22″W	West Liberty	
8	Patoker Archeological Site		July 30, 1975 (#75000812)	Address Restricted	Relief	
9	Sherman Archeological Site		July 30, 1975 (#75000813)	Address Restricted	Relief	

== See also ==
- List of National Historic Landmarks in Kentucky
- National Register of Historic Places listings in Kentucky
