= Kentucky Route 1010 =

Highway in Kentucky, US

Kentucky Route 1010
- KY 1010 highlighted in red

Route information
- Maintained by KYTC
- Length: 17.826 mi (28.688 km)

Major junctions
- South end: KY 1812 near Malaga
- Mountain Parkway near Rose Chapel; KY 191 near Hazel Green; KY 946 in Maytown
- North end: US 460 near Ezel

Location
- Country: United States
- State: Kentucky
- Counties: Wolfe, Morgan

Highway system
- Kentucky State Highway System; Interstate; US; State; Parkways
← KY 1009	→ KY 1011

Kentucky Route 1010 (KY 1010) is an 17.826-mile-long (28.688 km) state highway in the U.S. state of Kentucky. The route traverses rural areas of eastern Wolfe and southwestern Morgan counties. KY 1010 runs from KY 1812 northwest of Malaga to U.S. Route 460 (US 460) southeast of Hazel via Lexie, Rose Chapel, Hazel Green, Toliver, and Maytown.

== Major intersections ==
County	Location	mi	km	Destinations	Notes
Wolfe		0.000	0.000	KY 1812	Southern terminus
Wolfe		3.652	5.877	Mountain Parkway – Salyersville, Lexington	Mountain Parkway exit 53
Wolfe		4.542	7.310	KY 1953 east (Lacy Creek—Gilmore Road)	Western terminus of KY 1953
Wolfe		7.110	11.442	KY 191 west	Southern end of KY 191 concurrency
Wolfe	Red River	7.442– 7.466	11.977– 12.015	Hazel Green Academy Mountaineers Bridge	
Wolfe	Hazel Green	7.652	12.315	KY 191 east (Main Street) to KY 203 / East Broadway	Northern end of KY 191 concurrency; to KY 203 signed southbound only
Wolfe		9.719	15.641	KY 2489 north (Murphy Fork Road)	Southern terminus of KY 2489
Wolfe		11.236	18.083	KY 3356 south	Northern terminus of KY 3356
Wolfe		11.938	19.212	KY 3357 west (Sandfield Road)	Eastern terminus of KY 3357
Morgan		14.277	22.977	KY 2027 west	Eastern terminus of KY 2027
Morgan		14.403	23.179	KY 946 east	Southern end of KY 946 concurrency
Morgan	Maytown	14.556	23.426	KY 946 west (West Maytown Road)	Northern end of KY 946 concurrency
Morgan		16.900	27.198	KY 882 north	Southern terminus of KY 882
Morgan		17.826	28.688	US 460	Northern terminus
1.000 mi = 1.609 km; 1.000 km = 0.621 mi: Concurrency terminus
