= Kentucky Route 191 =

State highway in Kentucky, United States

Kentucky Route 191
- KY 191 highlighted in red

Route information
- Maintained by KYTC
- Length: 31.1 mi (50.1 km)

Major junctions
- West end: KY 15 in Campton
- KY 746 northeast of Campton; Mountain Parkway near Campton; KY 203 / KY 1010 in Hazel Green; Mountain Parkway / KY 205 in Helechawa
- East end: US 460 / KY 2498 in West Liberty

Location
- Country: United States
- State: Kentucky
- Counties: Wolfe, Morgan

Highway system
- Kentucky State Highway System; Interstate; US; State; Parkways
| ← KY 190 | → KY 192 |

Kentucky Route 191 (KY 191) is a 31.1-mile-long (50.1 km) state highway in the U.S. state of Kentucky. The highway connects Campton and West Liberty with mostly rural areas of Wolfe and Morgan counties.

== Route description ==
=== Wolfe County ===
KY 191 begins at an intersection with KY 15 in Campton, within Wolfe County. It travels to the northeast and immediately curves to the east-northeast before it intersects the western terminus of KY 2490 (Drake Street). It curves to the north and intersects the eastern terminus of KY 1653 (Johnson Street) on a curve back to the east-northeast. It crosses Swift Camp Creek. Immediately after this is an intersection with KY 2491 (Washington Street). One block later, it has a second intersection with KY 2490 (Marion Street). As soon as KY 191 leaves the city limits, it curves to the northeast. It curves to the east-southeast and intersects the southern terminus of KY 746 (Callaboose Ridge Road). Then, it starts paralleling the Mountain Parkway. It curves to the northeast and has a partial interchange with the parkway. The highway begins curving to the southeast and crosses over Stillwater Creek. Then, after it begins curving to the north-northeast, it intersects the northern terminus of KY 1812. In Trent, it intersects the southern terminus of KY 3356 (Trent–Gosneyville Road). KY 191 curves to a more easterly direction and then curves back to the north-northeast and crosses over Lacy Creek. It intersects KY 1010 (Lacy Creek Road). The two highways begin a concurrency. They cross over the Red River on the Hazel Green Academy Mountaineer Bridge and enter Hazel Green. At Broadway Street, KY 1010 turns off, while KY 191 continues to the north-northeast. One block later, it intersects the southern terminus of KY 203 (Main Street). KY 191 turns right and heads to the southeast before curving to a more easterly direction. In Daysboro, it intersects the northern terminus of KY 1419 (Upper Gilmore Road). It curves to the southeast and then travels through Insko and intersects KY 205. The two highway travel concurrently to the south-southeast. They curve to the southeast and enter Helechawa, where they begin paralleling the Mountain Parkway. They have an interchange with the parkway. Less than 500 feet (150 m) later, KY 205 splits off, while KY 191 continues to the southeast. A short distance after leaving Helechawa, the highway enters Morgan County.

=== Morgan County ===
KY 191 continues to the southeast and crosses over State Road Fork twice before entering Adele. It curves to the northeast and intersects the western terminus of KY 134. It winds its way to the north and northeast and travels through Cannel City and Caney. In Caney, it intersects the southern terminus of KY 1000. The highway crosses over Caney Creek and curves to the north-northwest. It intersects the western terminus of KY 1162. In Stacy Fork, it intersects the northern terminus of KY 844 (Buskirk–Stacy Fork Road). It has a second crossing of Caney Creek. Then, it travels through Malone and has a third crossing of Caney Creek. Then, it enters West Liberty. There, it travels just north of Morgan County High School and meets its eastern terminus, an intersection with U.S. Route 460 (US 460; West Main Street). Here, the roadway continues as the southern terminus of KY 2498 (Liberty Road).

== Major intersections ==
| County | Location | mi | km | Destinations | Notes |
|---|---|---|---|---|---|
| Wolfe | Campton | 0.0 | 0.0 | KY 15 to Mountain Parkway – Stanton, Jackson | |
| Wolfe | Campton | 0.1 | 0.16 | KY 2490 east (Drake Street) | Western terminus of KY 2490 |
| Wolfe | Campton | 0.2 | 0.32 | KY 1653 west (Johnson Street) | Eastern terminus of KY 1653 |
| Wolfe | Campton | 0.3 | 0.48 | KY 2491 (Washington Street) | |
| Wolfe | Campton | 0.3 | 0.48 | KY 2490 (Marion Street) | |
| Wolfe | | 1.5 | 2.4 | KY 746 north (Callaboose Ridge Road) | Southern terminus of KY 746 |
| Wolfe | | 3.0 | 4.8 | Mountain Parkway – Salyersville | Unnumbered exit; no access from Mountain Parkway east to KY 191 or from KY 191 to Mountain Parkway west |
| Wolfe | | 4.9 | 7.9 | KY 1812 south | Northern terminus of KY 1812 |
| Wolfe | Trent | 6.8 | 10.9 | KY 3356 north (Trent–Gosneyville Road) | Southern terminus of KY 3356 |
| Wolfe | | 9.7 | 15.6 | KY 1010 south (Lacy Creek Road) | Western end of KY 1010 concurrency |
| Wolfe | Hazel Green | 10.0 | 16.1 | Hazel Green Academy Mountaineer Bridge over the Red River | |
| Wolfe | Hazel Green | 10.2 | 16.4 | KY 1010 north (Broadway Street) | Eastern end of KY 1010 concurrency |
| Wolfe | Hazel Green | 10.3 | 16.6 | KY 203 north (Main Street) | Southern terminus of KY 203 |
| Wolfe | Daysboro | 12.7 | 20.4 | KY 1419 south (Upper Gilmore Road) | Northern terminus of KY 1419 |
| Wolfe | | 14.3 | 23.0 | KY 205 north | Western end of KY 205 concurrency |
| Wolfe | Helechawa | 15.8 | 25.4 | Mountain Parkway – Campton, Lexington | Mountain Parkway exit 57; no access from KY 191 to Mountain Parkway east or vice versa; access is on KY 205 |
| Wolfe | Helechawa | 15.9 | 25.6 | KY 205 south to Mountain Parkway east | Eastern end of KY 205 concurrency |
| Morgan | Adele | 18.3 | 29.5 | KY 134 east | Western terminus of KY 134 |
| Morgan | Caney | 22.8 | 36.7 | KY 1000 north | Southern terminus of KY 1000 |
| Morgan | | 24.7 | 39.8 | KY 1162 east | Western terminus of KY 1162 |
| Morgan | Stacy Fork | 25.8 | 41.5 | KY 844 south (Buskirk–Stacy Fork Road) | Northern terminus of KY 844 |
| Morgan | West Liberty | 31.1 | 50.1 | US 460 (West Main Street) / KY 2498 north (Liberty Road) – Frenchburg, Salyersville | Southern terminus of KY 2498 |
1.000 mi = 1.609 km; 1.000 km = 0.621 mi: Concurrency terminus; Incomplete access
