= Morgan County Courthouse =

Morgan County Courthouse may refer to:

- Morgan County Courthouse and Jail, Fort Morgan, Colorado, listed on the National Register of Historic Places (NRHP)
- Morgan County Courthouse (Georgia), Madison, Georgia
- Morgan County Courthouse (Illinois), Jacksonville, Illinois
- Morgan County Courthouse (Indiana), Martinsville, Indiana
- Morgan County Courthouse (Kentucky), West Liberty, Kentucky
- Morgan County Courthouse (Missouri), Versailles, Missouri
- Morgan County Courthouse (Ohio), McConnelsville, Morgan County, Ohio
- Morgan County Courthouse (West Virginia), Berkeley Springs, West Virginia
