= Kentucky Route 203 =

State highway in Kentucky, United States

Kentucky Route 203
- KY 203 highlighted in red

Route information
- Maintained by KYTC
- Length: 5.1 mi (8.2 km)

Major junctions
- South end: KY 191 in Hazel Green
- KY 3089 northwest of Rexville
- North end: US 460 in Mize

Location
- Country: United States
- State: Kentucky
- Counties: Wolfe, Morgan

Highway system
- Kentucky State Highway System; Interstate; US; State; Parkways
← KY 201	→ KY 204

Kentucky Route 203 (KY 203) is a 5.1-mile-long (8.2 km) state highway in the U.S. state of Kentucky. The highway connects mostly rural areas of Wolfe and Morgan counties with Hazel Green and Mize.

== Route description ==
KY 203 begins at an intersection with KY 191 (Main Street) in Hazel Green, within Wolfe County. It travels to the northeast and curves to the north-northeast and enters Morgan County. The highway parallels Caskey Fork before it intersects the northern terminus of KY 3089 (Nickell Fork–Daysboro Road). It crosses Oldfield Fork and enters Mize, where it meets its northern terminus, an intersection with U.S. Route 460.

== Major intersections ==
County	Location	mi	km	Destinations	Notes
Wolfe	Hazel Green	0.0	0.0	KY 191 (Main Street) to Mountain Parkway	Southern terminus
Morgan		3.1	5.0	KY 3089 south (Nickell Fork–Daysboro Road)	Northern terminus of KY 3089
Morgan	Mize	5.1	8.2	US 460 – Jeffersonville, West Liberty	Northern terminus
1.000 mi = 1.609 km; 1.000 km = 0.621 mi
