= Pete Center =

American baseball player (1912–2004)

- Pitcher
- Born: April 22, 1912; Hazel Green, Kentucky
- Died: August 8, 2004 (aged 92); Campton, Kentucky
- Batted: Right Threw: Right

MLB debut
- September 11, 1942, for the Cleveland Indians

Last MLB appearance
- September 8, 1946, for the Cleveland Indians

MLB statistics
- Win–loss record: 7–7
- Earned run average: 4.10
- Innings pitched: 160 1/3
- Stats at Baseball Reference

Teams
- Cleveland Indians (1942–1943; 1945–1946)

Marvin Earl "Pete" Center (April 22, 1912 – August 8, 2004) was an American professional baseball player, a right-handed pitcher who appeared in 77 Major League games over all or part of four seasons (1942–1943; 1945–1946) for the Cleveland Indians. A native of Hazel Green, Kentucky, the 6 ft 4 in (1.93 m), 190 lb (86 kg) Center attended Morehead State University.

Center's pitching career began in 1934 in the St. Louis Cardinals' farm system. After spending two seasons in Class D baseball, he was out of the professional ranks in 1936, then spent 1937 as a position player before resuming his mound career in 1938 in the Class B Southeastern League. Acquired by the Indians the following year, Center rose to A ball, then the top level of minor league baseball, before making his debut with Cleveland on September 11, 1942. In relief of Jim Bagby, Jr., Center allowed seven hits, four bases on balls and six earned runs in 3 1/3 innings pitched as the Indians bowed to the Boston Red Sox, 15–2, at League Park.

He spent the full 1943 campaign with Cleveland, appearing in 24 games, all but one as a relief pitcher, then served in the United States Army Air Forces during the 1944 campaign. Center then returned to the Indians for the 1945 season. That year he worked in 31 games, eight as a starting pitcher, and won six of nine decisions, with two complete games and one save. His MLB career wound down in 1946, with 21 appearances, all in relief, for Cleveland.

Altogether, Center allowed 154 hits and 70 bases on balls in 160 1/3 innings pitched in the majors, with 50 strikeouts and three saves. He finished with seven wins and seven losses in 14 decisions and posted a 4.10 career earned run average.
