= Caney, Kentucky =

Unincorporated community in Kentucky, United States

- Unincorporated community
- Location within Kentucky Location within the United States
- Coordinates: 37°48′5″N 83°15′33″W
- Country: United States
- State: Kentucky
- County: Morgan
- Elevation: 869 ft (265 m)
- Time zone: UTC-5 (Eastern (EST))
  - Summer (DST): UTC-4 (EDT)
- ZIP codes: 41407
- GNIS feature ID: 488810

Caney is an unincorporated community and coal town in Morgan County, Kentucky, United States. It lies along Route 191 south of the city of West Liberty, the county seat of Morgan County. Its elevation is 869 feet (265 m).
