= Hazel Green Academy =

- Hazel Green Academy Historic Buildings
- U.S. National Register of Historic Places
- U.S. Historic district
- Location within Kentucky Location within the United States
- Location: Kentucky Route 191, Hazel Green, Kentucky
- Coordinates: 37°47′43″N 83°24′45″W
- Area: 0.4 acres (0.16 ha)
- Built: 1910
- NRHP reference No.: 79001047
- Added to NRHP: July 18, 1979

Hazel Green Academy was a school in the little village of Hazel Green, eastern Wolfe County, eastern Kentucky. It was established in 1880 by a Charter from the Kentucky Legislature. The bill was introduced by a Hazel Green citizen, Senator W.O. Mize. The Founders of the school were Mize and his wife, Hazel Green merchant, J. Taylor Day, and Green Berry Swango.

The first classes were held in the Hazel Green Masonic Hall, before a permanent school building was erected downtown in 1885. N. B. (Napoleon Bonaparte) Hays was the first principal. He was later the Attorney General of Kentucky.

At the invitation of the Founders, in 1886, the Kentucky Christian Woman's Board of Missions (CWBM), a sisterhood of the Christian Church (Disciples of Christ), assumed operation of the financially ailing school. The magnitude of the undertaking as the "Kentucky Mountain Mission" caused the Kentucky Board to appeal to the National CWBM at Indianapolis for support. By 1919, the CWBM was enveloped in the new United Christian Missionary Society (UCMS) which sponsored the Academy.

The school closed on August 31, 1983. Its last Director was Robert "Sandy" Goodlett and the last Principal was Bob Dailey. Dailey was the principal, 1980–83. Before that he was the math and science teacher for two years.

In its earlier years, the Academy was called the "Athens of the West" and the "Mother Mountain School" as it preceded other private, missionary and public schools in its 20 county service area by several years.

Much of the Academy complex was listed on the National Register of Historic Places in 1979, qualifying because of its significant place in the area's history.
