= Wheel Rim, Kentucky =

Unincorporated community in Kentucky, United States

- Unincorporated community
- Location within Kentucky Location within the United States
- Coordinates: 37°43′34″N 83°16′1″W
- Country: United States
- State: Kentucky
- County: Morgan
- Elevation: 942 ft (287 m)
- Time zone: UTC-5 (Eastern (EST))
  - Summer (DST): UTC-4 (EDT)
- GNIS feature ID: 509349

Wheel Rim is an unincorporated community in Morgan County, Kentucky, United States. The community was named for a wagon wheel rim noted to be hanging in the trees.
