= Cannel City, Kentucky =

Unincorporated community in Kentucky, United States

- Unincorporated community
- Location within Kentucky Location within the United States
- Coordinates: 37°47′24″N 83°16′27″W
- Country: United States
- State: Kentucky
- County: Morgan
- Elevation: 892 ft (272 m)
- Time zone: UTC-5 (Eastern (EST))
  - Summer (DST): UTC-4 (EDT)
- ZIP codes: 41408
- GNIS feature ID: 488881

Cannel City is an unincorporated community in Morgan County, Kentucky, United States. It lies along Route 191 south of the city of West Liberty, the county seat of Morgan County. In 1901, the Ohio and Kentucky railway tracks were laid through the region and thrived until the Cannel Coal Company's resources were depleted and forestry resources of the Licking River played out at the same time. On November 1, 1933, the last train trip of the Ohio and Kentucky Junction Railroad-Cannel City Line was made and the track was scrapped. During the golden years, there were several grocery stores, a hardware store, post office, mine, bank, blacksmith and an elegant hotel named The DeLancy. Also standing at over 100 years old is the well used by the trains to put water into their engines. Lost over the years was a train depot at the end of Highway 134, where it currently intersects with Highway 191. At one time, the area had a larger population and count of buildings than the present-day county seat West Liberty. After the mine closed, the area still partially thrived during the times after the Great Depression.
