= Trent, Kentucky =

Unincorporated community in Kentucky, United States

Trent
- Unincorporated community
- Location within the state of Kentucky Trent (the United States)
- Coordinates: 37°46′19″N 83°27′41″W
- Country: United States
- State: Kentucky
- County: Wolfe
- Elevation: 1,030 ft (310 m)
- Time zone: UTC-5 (Eastern (EST))
  - Summer (DST): UTC-4 (EDT)
- GNIS feature ID: 509230

Trent is an unincorporated community in Wolfe County, Kentucky, United States. It lies along Route 191 northeast of the city of Campton, the county seat of Wolfe County. Its elevation is 1,030 feet (314 m).
