= Christian Church of West Liberty =

- U.S. National Register of Historic Places
- Location within Kentucky Location within the United States
- Location: 304 Prestonsburg St., West Liberty, Kentucky
- Coordinates: 37°55′17″N 83°15′31″W
- NRHP reference No.: 10000529
- Added to NRHP: August 5, 2010

The Christian Church of West Liberty, at 304 Prestonsburg St. in West Liberty in Morgan County, Kentucky, was listed on the National Register of Historic Places in 2010.

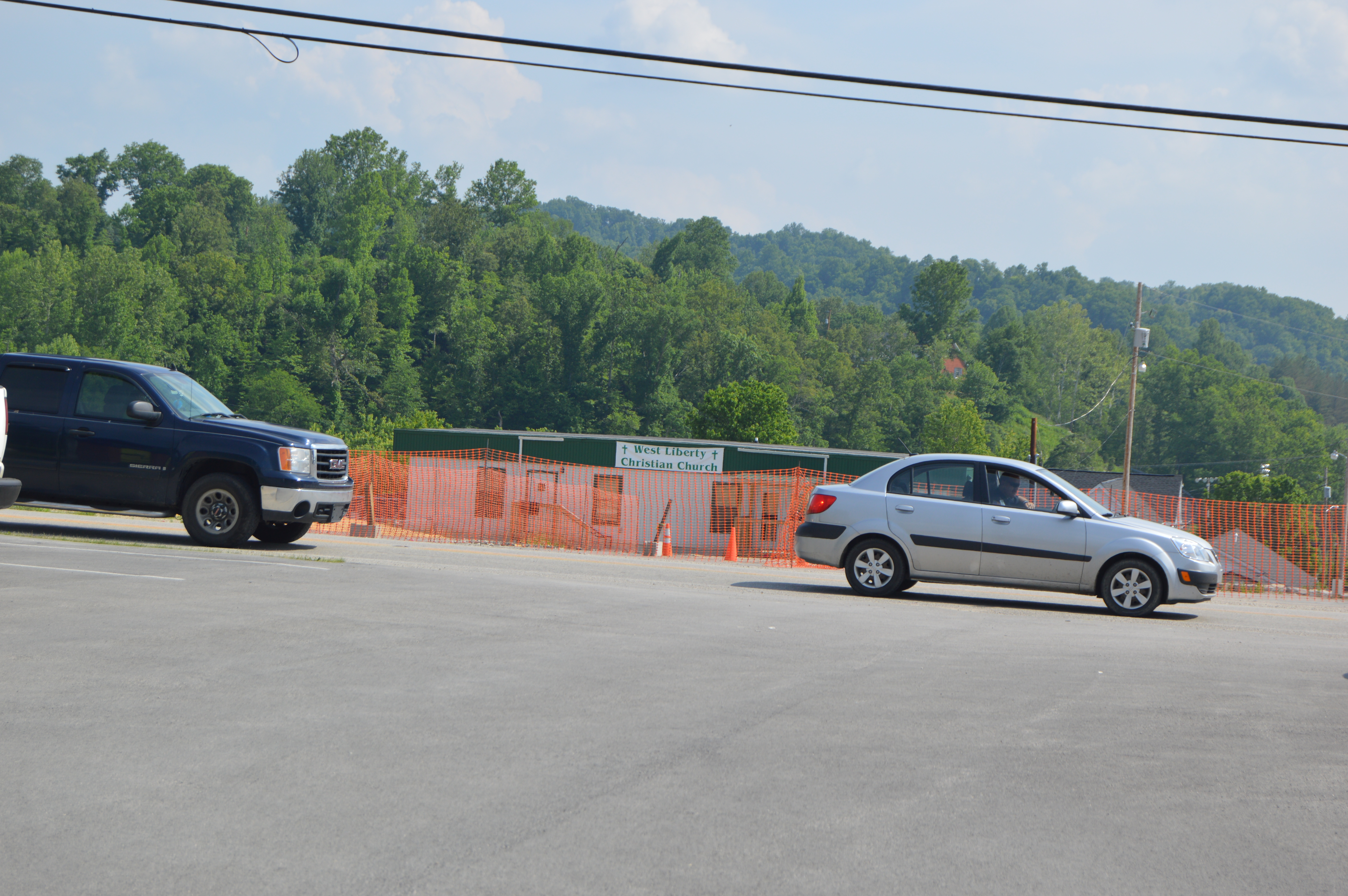
Site of church, in May 2014

The church was destroyed in a tornado of March 2, 2012.

A newly constructed West Liberty Christian Church was dedicated on April 9, 2016.
