= Stacy Fork, Kentucky =

Unincorporated community in Kentucky, United States

- Unincorporated community
- Location within Kentucky Location within the United States
- Coordinates: 37°50′29″N 83°15′27″W
- Country: United States
- State: Kentucky
- County: Morgan
- Elevation: 823 ft (251 m)
- Time zone: UTC-5 (Eastern (EST))
  - Summer (DST): UTC-4 (EDT)
- ZIP codes: 41458
- GNIS feature ID: 509116

Stacy Fork is an unincorporated community in Morgan County, Kentucky, United States. It lies along Route 191 south of the city of West Liberty, the county seat of Morgan County. Its elevation is 823 feet (251 m).

The community's name is taken from the Stacy Fork, named after pioneer settler Meshack Shadrack Stacy (1792–1870), who traveled through the Cumberland Gap from Tennessee and settled the area in the early 19th century.
