= Moon, Kentucky =

Unincorporated community in Kentucky, United States

- Unincorporated community
- Location within Kentucky Location within the United States
- Coordinates: 37°58′24″N 83°2′56″W
- Country: United States
- State: Kentucky
- County: Morgan
- Elevation: 755 ft (230 m)
- Time zone: UTC-5 (Eastern Time Zone)
  - Summer (DST): UTC-4 (EDT)
- ZIP code: 41457
- GNIS feature ID: 508633

Moon is an unincorporated community in Morgan County, Kentucky, United States. It lies along Kentucky Route 172 northeast of the city of West Liberty, Kentucky, the county seat of Morgan County. The community's post office, opened in 1905 and closed in 1993
