= Kentucky Route 715 =

State highway in Kentucky, United States

Kentucky Route 715
- KY 715 highlighted in red

Route information
- Maintained by KYTC
- Length: 19.692 mi (31.691 km)

Major junctions
- South end: KY 11 near Zachariah
- KY 15 near Pine Ridge
- North end: KY 77 in Red River Gorge

Location
- Country: United States
- State: Kentucky
- Counties: Wolfe, Menifee

Highway system
- Kentucky State Highway System; Interstate; US; State; Parkways
← KY 714	→ KY 716

Kentucky Route 715 (KY 715) is a 19.692-mile-long (31.691 km) state highway in western Wolfe County and southern Menifee County that runs from Kentucky Route 11 east of Zachariah to Kentucky Route 77 in the Red River Gorge via Rogers and Pine Ridge. From KY 15 to its northern terminus, KY 715 serves as an important route into the Gorge, with its entire Menifee County portion running parallel to the Red River.

== Major intersections ==
County	Location	mi	km	Destinations	Notes
Wolfe		0.000	0.000	KY 11	Southern terminus
Wolfe		2.648	4.262	KY 2016 south (Big Andy Bridge Road)	Northern terminus of KY 2016
Wolfe		5.765	9.278	KY 15 south – Campton, Lexington	South end of KY 15 overlap
Wolfe	Pine Ridge	6.599	10.620	KY 15 north – Natural Bridge, Stanton	North end of KY 15 overlap
Menifee	Red River Gorge	19.692	31.691	KY 77 (Tarr Ridge Road) – Natural Bridge, Frenchburg	Northern terminus
1.000 mi = 1.609 km; 1.000 km = 0.621 mi: Concurrency terminus
