= Right Fork, Kentucky =

Unincorporated community in Kentucky, United States

- Unincorporated community
- Location within Kentucky Location within the United States
- Coordinates: 37°49′54″N 83°20′14″W
- Country: United States
- State: Kentucky
- County: Morgan
- Elevation: 814 ft (248 m)
- Time zone: UTC-5 (Eastern (EST))
  - Summer (DST): UTC-4 (EDT)
- GNIS feature ID: 2362587

Right Fork is an unincorporated community in Morgan County, Kentucky, United States.
