= Ezel, Kentucky =

Census-designated place in Kentucky, United States

- Census-designated place
- Location within Kentucky Location within the United States
- Coordinates: 37°53′28″N 83°26′40″W
- Country: United States
- State: Kentucky
- County: Morgan

Area
  - Total: 0.89 sq mi (2.30 km^{2})
  - Land: 0.88 sq mi (2.29 km^{2})
  - Water: 0.0039 sq mi (0.01 km^{2})
- Elevation: 945 ft (288 m)

Population (2020)
  - Total: 209
  - Density: 236.1/sq mi (91.16/km^{2})
- Time zone: UTC-5 (Eastern (EST))
  - Summer (DST): UTC-4 (EDT)
- ZIP code: 41425
- FIPS code: 21-25876
- GNIS feature ID: 512105

Ezel (also Ecell and Ezell) is an unincorporated community and census-designated place (CDP) in Morgan County, Kentucky, United States. As of the 2020 census, it had a population of 209. It has a small post office, with the ZIP code 41425.

== History ==
First incorporated in 1882, the town was given the name "Ezel", for a rock in the Bible, by its first postmaster, Eli Pieratt, when the post office opened in 1875. It is now home to Ezel Elementary School and the Blackwater Volunteer Fire Department.

== Geography ==
Ezel lies along U.S. Route 460, 14 miles (23 km) west of the city of West Liberty, the county seat of Morgan County. Frenchburg is 12 miles (19 km) further west along US 460. The elevation of Ezel is 945 feet (288 m).

According to the U.S. Census Bureau, the Ezel CDP has a total area of 0.89 square miles (2.31 km^{2}), of which 0.004 square miles (0.010 km^{2}), or 0.45%, are water. Blackwater Creek runs along the southeast edge of the community, leading northeast to the Licking River near Kellacey.

== Demographics ==
Historical population
Census	Pop.	Note	%±
2010	235		—
2020	209		−11.1%
U.S. Decennial Census
