= Relief, Kentucky =

Unincorporated community in Kentucky, United States

- Unincorporated community
- Location within Kentucky Location within the United States
- Coordinates: 37°56′41″N 82°59′43″W
- Country: United States
- State: Kentucky
- County: Morgan
- Elevation: 732 ft (223 m)
- Time zone: UTC-5 (Eastern (EST))
  - Summer (DST): UTC-4 (EDT)
- GNIS feature ID: 508918

Relief is an unincorporated community in Morgan County, Kentucky, United States. It lies along Route 172 east of the city of West Liberty, the county seat of Morgan County. Its elevation is 732 feet (223 m).

A post office called Relief was established in 1859, and remained in operation until 1983. For the early settlers, the convenience of having a post office in the community was a "relief", hence the name.
