= Ligon, Kentucky =

Unincorporated community in Kentucky, United States

- Unincorporated community
- Location within the state of Kentucky Ligon (the United States)
- Coordinates: 37°22′13″N 82°40′22″W
- Country: United States
- State: Kentucky
- County: Floyd
- Elevation: 1,401 ft (427 m)
- Time zone: UTC-5 (Easternl (EST))
  - Summer (DST): UTC-4 (EST)
- ZIP codes: 41646
- GNIS feature ID: 508459

Ligon is an unincorporated community and coal town in Floyd County, Kentucky, United States. The community is on U.S. Route 460.
