= Kellacey, Kentucky =

Unincorporated community in Kentucky, United States

- Unincorporated community
- Location within Kentucky Location within the United States
- Coordinates: 37°57′43″N 83°23′30″W
- Country: United States
- State: Kentucky
- County: Morgan
- Elevation: 942 ft (287 m)
- Time zone: UTC-5 (Eastern (EST))
  - Summer (DST): UTC-4 (EDT)
- GNIS feature ID: 513110

Kellacey is an unincorporated community in Morgan County, Kentucky, United States.
