= Billy Adams (rockabilly musician) =

American rockabilly musician (1940–2019)

Willie Murray Adams (March 6, 1940 – March 30, 2019) was an American rockabilly musician and a member of the Rockabilly Hall of Fame. He recorded the 1950s song "Rock, Pretty Mama", recognized as "a seminal rockabilly classic" by critics. Other songs he recorded in the 1950s include "You Heard Me Knocking", "True Love Will Come Your Way", and "You Gotta Have a Duck Tail". He toured with his family band for decades and, as his rockabilly interest declined, he entered the ministry and wrote Gospel songs. He made a comeback late in his career when a collection of 27 of Adams' songs was released in 2002. Fans re-embraced his rockabilly music 45 years after the original recordings, igniting demand for his appearances at music festivals in U.S. and Britain. Adams died March 30, 2019, at age 79.

== Early life ==
He was born in Redbush, Kentucky, one of 14 children. His father was a coal miner at the Van Lear Coal mine in Kentucky. As a youth, he had no money for instruments; he strummed a lard bucket lid, pretending it was a guitar, while listening to Bill Monroe on the Grand Ole Opry. At age 12, Adams borrowed a neighbor's guitar to perform on the radio for the first time on WCMI in Ashland, Kentucky. He formed his first band at age 14 called "The Rock & Roll Boys", soon renamed "The Rock-A-Teers".

== Career ==
Influenced by Elvis Presley's style heard on the radio, Adams formed a band in 1954 consisting of his brother Charles (guitar) and Curtis May (upright bass). Encouraged by local entertainer Luke Gordon, Adams went to Cincinnati in 1957 to record his composition "Rock, Pretty Mama", called by music writer Lorie Hollabaugh "a seminal Rockabilly classic". It was released on an independent label, Quincy Records, and the original 45rpm record is sought after as a collector's item. The recording was included on a Sanctuary/BMG compilation album in 2003 called "Rockabilly Riot " along with songs by Elvis Presley, Jerry Lee Lewis and Roy Orbison. Brian Setzer used a similar title in two of his albums including the 2014 album "Rockabilly Riot! All Original " which pays homage to this original compilation but features all-new rockabilly songs.

In 1961, Adams married Freda Lousie Riffe; they had three daughters, Tina Maria, Teresa Louise and Janetta Darlene. They formed a family band that toured together for decades. In 1965, Adams changed his direction and went into Christian ministry. He wrote gospel and country songs including the gospel tune, "I Saw The Man", by the Happy Goodman Family.

After his early rockabilly career faded and his focus had turned to religious music, his recordings from 45 years prior began a resurgence of popularity and were released by MCA, Bear Family and Ace Records. In 2002, he recorded a comeback album at Sun Studio in Memphis, called "Legacy ", which received critical acclaim. In 2002, the U.K.'s Sanctuary Records released "Billy Adams– Rockin' Thru The Years ", a 27-song compilation of his rockabilly career. This helped re-energize his career and he was asked to perform at Austin's "South by Southwest" and other music festivals in the U.S. and the U.K. in his later years.

He received the Kentucky Colonel commission by the State of Kentucky. His wife died of cancer in 2007 and he remarried to Sue Justice in 2010, who survived him.

== Death ==
Adams died in Westmoreland, Tennessee, March 30, 2019, twenty-four days after his 79th birthday.
