= Kentucky Route 302 =

State highway in Kentucky, United States

Kentucky Route 302
- KY 302 highlighted in red

Route information
- Maintained by KYTC
- Length: 19.0 mi (30.6 km)

Major junctions
- South end: US 23 / US 460 / KY 80 in Watergap
- North end: KY 1428 in Hager Hill

Location
- Country: United States
- State: Kentucky
- Counties: Floyd, Johnson

Highway system
- Kentucky State Highway System; Interstate; US; State; Parkways
← KY 301	→ KY 303

Kentucky Route 302 (KY 302) is a 19.0-mile-long (30.6 km) state highway in the U.S. state of Kentucky. The highway connects mostly rural areas of Floyd and Johnson counties with Watergap and Hager Hill.

== Route description ==
=== Floyd County ===
KY 302 begins at an interchange with US 23/US 460/KY 80 in Watergap within Floyd County. It travels to the north-northeast, paralleling Bull Creek, and crosses over the creek twice. It enters Bull Creek, where it crosses over some railroad tracks and travels over Levisa Fork. On the north side of the bridge, it enters Lancer, where it begins to parallel Brandy Keg Creek and intersects KY 1428 (Lake Drive). After it leaves Lancer, it intersects the western terminus of KY 3386 (Corn Fork Road), where it leaves the creek. The highway then enters the Jenny Wiley State Resort Park and curves to the north-northwest and begins paralleling Dewey Lake. It curves to the southwest and then to the northwest. It crosses over Stratton Branch just before intersecting the eastern terminus of KY 3024 (Maggie Mountain Road). KY 302 curves to the northeast and then to the southwest. After it curves to the northwest, it crosses over Gobel Branch. Just after it intersects the eastern terminus of KY 3051, it turns right, to the north-northeast, and leaves the park. The highway winds its way to the northeast and crosses Johns Creek. It then leaves the lake and then begins to parallel the creek. It crosses over Long Branch. It curves to the north and crosses Daniels Creek. Then, enters Johnson County.

=== Johnson County ===
KY 302 intersects the western terminus of KY 3507 before it travels under an overpass that carries KY 3. It curves to the southwest and then to the west-northwest. It crosses over Hayden Branch and curves to the north-northeast. There, it leaves Johns Creek and travels through Nero. The highway curves to the northwest and crosses Flatwood Branch. It intersects the northern terminus of KY 2381 (Johns Creek Road). KY 302 curves to the northeast and enters Van Lear. There, it curves back to the northwest, crosses over Miller Creek, begins to parallel the creek, and crosses the creek twice. It intersects KY 1107 just before it crosses Levisa Fork a second time on the William Barker Memorial Bridge. It then enters West Van Lear. The highway curves to the east-northeast and intersects KY 2258 (South Clay Avenue) and the western terminus of KY 3127 (Boyd Street). At this intersection, the highway curves to the north-northwest. One block later, it intersects the western terminus of KY 3128 (Meek Street). One block after that is the western terminus of KY 3129 (Richmond Street). Yet another block later, it has a second intersection with KY 2558 (McClure Street/North Clay Avenue). At this intersection, it curves to the southwest. It curves to the northwest and intersects the western terminus of KY 3130 (Duncan Avenue). One block later, it intersects the western terminus of KY 3131 (Stafford Street). Then, the highway curves to the west-northwest, crosses over some railroad tracks and then Burnt Cabin Branch, and meets its northern terminus, an intersection with KY 1428 in Hager Hill.

== Major intersections ==
County	Location	mi	km	Destinations	Notes
Floyd	Watergap	0.0	0.0	US 23 (Winchester Road) / US 460 / KY 80 – Pikeville, Paintsville, Hazard	Southern terminus
Floyd	Lancer	2.4	3.9	KY 1428 (Lake Drive)	
Floyd		3.2	5.1	KY 3386 east (Corn Fork Road)	Western terminus of KY 3386
Floyd	Jenny Wiley State Resort Park	5.5	8.9	KY 3024 west (Maggie Mountain Road)	Eastern terminus of KY 3024
Floyd	Jenny Wiley State Resort Park	9.6	15.4	KY 3051 west	Eastern terminus of KY 3051
Johnson		12.5	20.1	KY 3507 east to KY 3	Western terminus of KY 3507
Johnson		15.1	24.3	KY 2381 south (Johns Creek Road)	Northern terminus of KY 2381
Johnson		17.8	28.6	KY 1107	
Johnson	Levisa Fork	17.9	28.8	William Barker Memorial Bridge	
Johnson	West Van Lear	18.2	29.3	KY 2558 (South Clay Avenue/Boyd Street) / KY 3127 east (Boyd Street)	Western terminus of KY 3127
Johnson	West Van Lear	18.3	29.5	KY 3128 east (Meek Street)	Western terminus of KY 3128
Johnson	West Van Lear	18.3	29.5	KY 3129 east (Richmond Street)	Western terminus of KY 3129
Johnson	West Van Lear	18.4	29.6	KY 2558 (McClure Street/North Clay Avenue)	
Johnson	West Van Lear	18.5	29.8	KY 3130 east (Duncan Avenue)	Western terminus of KY 3130
Johnson	West Van Lear	18.6	29.9	KY 3131 east (Stafford Street)	Western terminus of KY 3131
Johnson	Hager Hill	19.0	30.6	KY 1428	Northern terminus
1.000 mi = 1.609 km; 1.000 km = 0.621 mi
