= Edgar Tolson =

American wood carver (1904–1984)

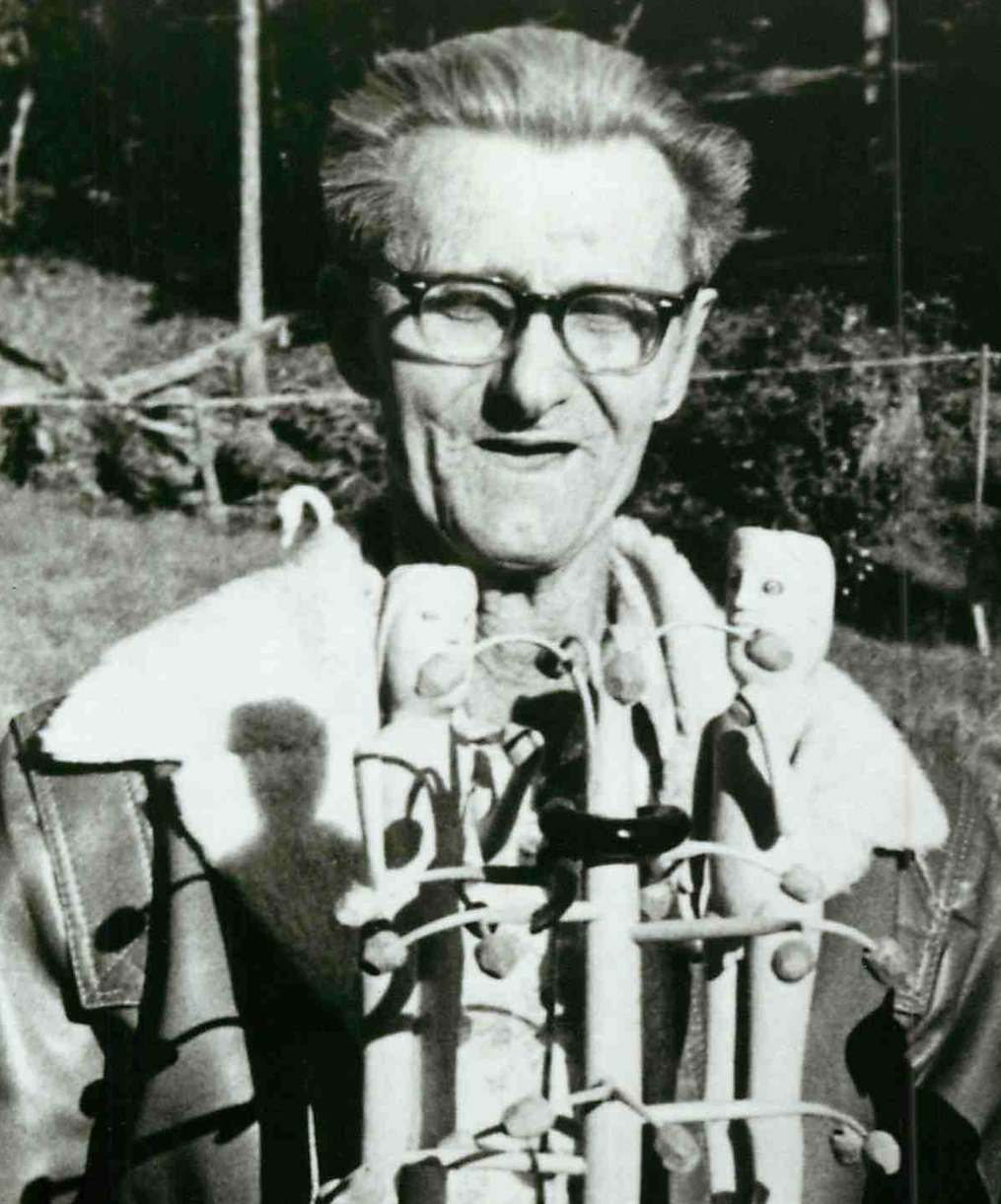
- Born: June 24, 1904; Lee City, Wolfe County, Kentucky
- Died: September 7, 1984 (aged 80); Campton, Kentucky
- Known for: Woodcarver, folk artist
- Notable work: "Fall of Man" cycle, carvings portraying the story of Adam and Eve

Edgar Tolson (1904–1984) was a woodcarver from Kentucky who became a well-known folk artist.

He was born in Lee City, Wolfe County, Kentucky as the fourth of eleven children and educated through the sixth grade. He worked as a carpenter and stonemason and was married twice, fathering eighteen children in all, one of whom is Paul Tolson, a local of Campton, who is also a gifted carver and sketch artist. Although Tolson began working in the tradition of the Appalachian woodcarvers before him, after suffering a stroke in 1957, he became a full-time woodcarver and artist, and his subject matter grew increasingly idiosyncratic.

Tolson first came to national attention through the Grassroots Craftsmen, an initiative of Lyndon Johnson's War on Poverty that helped Appalachian craftspeople to sell their works. Ralph Rinzler of the Smithsonian Institution was impressed by Tolson's figures, and included them in the 1971 Festival of American Folklife. University of Kentucky professor Michael Hall also became Tolson's primary dealer at this time, and his work was included in the 1973 Whitney Biennial.

Tolson is best known for his "Fall of Man" cycle, a series of carvings portraying the story of Adam and Eve.

He died in Campton, Kentucky in 1984.

The Edgar Tolson Folk Art Library at Morehead State University is named after him.
