= Zag, Kentucky =

Unincorporated community in Kentucky, United States

- Unincorporated community
- Location within Kentucky Location within the United States
- Coordinates: 37°59′12″N 83°21′54″W
- Country: United States
- State: Kentucky
- County: Morgan
- Elevation: 951 ft (290 m)
- Time zone: UTC-5 (Eastern (EST))
  - Summer (DST): UTC-4 (EDT)
- GNIS feature ID: 516525

Zag is an unincorporated community in Morgan County, Kentucky, United States. Its post office closed in 1965.
