= Ophir, Kentucky =

Unincorporated community in Kentucky, United States

- Unincorporated community
- Location within Kentucky Location within the United States
- Coordinates: 37°54′26″N 83°00′52″W
- Country: United States
- State: Kentucky
- County: Morgan
- Elevation: 735 ft (224 m)
- Time zone: UTC-5 (Eastern (EST))
  - Summer (DST): UTC-4 (EDT)
- ZIP codes: 41459
- GNIS feature ID: 508754

Ophir is an unincorporated community in Morgan County, Kentucky, United States. Its post office has closed.

Ophir is located at an elevation of 735 feet (224 m), and the community's ZIP code is 41459.
