= Mize, Kentucky =

Unincorporated community in Kentucky, United States

- Unincorporated community
- Location within Kentucky Location within the United States
- Coordinates: 37°51′34″N 83°22′25″W
- Country: United States
- State: Kentucky
- County: Morgan
- Elevation: 817 ft (249 m)
- Time zone: UTC-5 (Eastern (EST))
  - Summer (DST): UTC-4 (EDT)
- ZIP codes: 41352
- GNIS feature ID: 508620

Mize is an unincorporated community in Morgan County, Kentucky, United States. It lies along U.S. Route 460 and Kentucky Route 203, southwest of the city of West Liberty, the county seat of Morgan County. Its elevation is 817 feet (249 m). It has a post office with the ZIP code 41352.
