= Watergap, Kentucky =

Unincorporated community in Kentucky, United States

- Unincorporated community
- Location within the state of Kentucky Watergap (the United States)
- Coordinates: 37°38′11″N 82°44′45″W
- Country: United States
- State: Kentucky
- County: Floyd
- Elevation: 673 ft (205 m)
- Time zone: UTC-5 (Eastern (EST))
  - Summer (DST): UTC-4 (EDT)
- GNIS feature ID: 509322

Watergap is an unincorporated community and coal town in Floyd County, Kentucky, United States.

== Geography ==
Watergap is on Kentucky Route 80, as well as U.S. Route 460, U.S. Route 23, the southern terminus of Kentucky Route 302, and Kentucky Route 3384.
