= Martinsville Commercial Historic District =

Historic district in Indiana, United States

- U.S. National Register of Historic Places
- U.S. Historic district
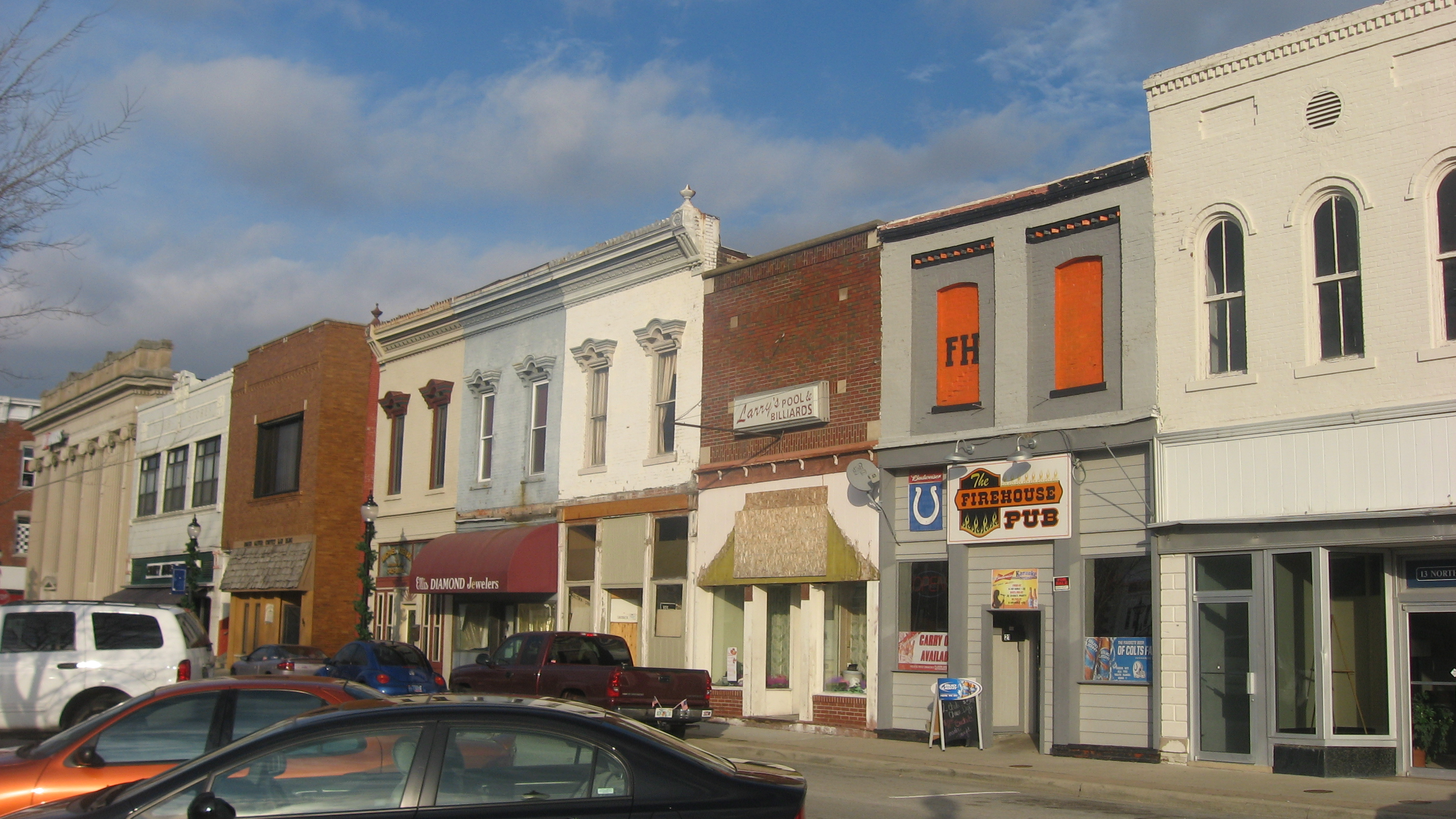
- Eastern side of Courthouse Square in Martinsville, December 2011

- Location within Indiana Location within the United States
- Location: Roughly bounded by Pike, Mulberry, Jackson, and Sycamore Sts., Martinsville, Indiana
- Coordinates: 39°25′39″N 86°25′41″W
- Area: 11 acres (4.5 ha)
- Built: 1857
- Architect: Hodgson, Isaac
- Architectural style: Italianate, Classical Revival, Tudor Revival
- NRHP reference No.: 98000300
- Added to NRHP: April 1, 1998

Martinsville Commercial Historic District is a national historic district located at Martinsville, Indiana. The district encompasses 75 contributing buildings and one contributing object in the central business district of Martinsville. It developed between about 1847 and 1947, and includes notable examples of Italianate, Classical Revival, and Tudor Revival style architecture. Located in the district are the separately listed Morgan County Courthouse and Blackstone House and Martinsville Telephone Company Building. Other notable buildings are the Martinsville Public Library (1906, 1990), Martinsville City Hall (1917), Martinsville Post Office (1935, 1974), Pitkin Building (c. 1900), Barskin's Department Store (1922), Indiana Theater (1914, 1927, 1939), Steven's House / Building (c. 1847, c. 1915), Hale Building (c. 1860, 1917), Interurban Station (1902, c. 1956), Union Block (1866), and First Christian Church (1891) and Annex (1927).

It was listed on the National Register of Historic Places in 1998.
