= Blackstone House and Martinsville Telephone Company Building =

- U.S. National Register of Historic Places
- U.S. Historic district – Contributing property
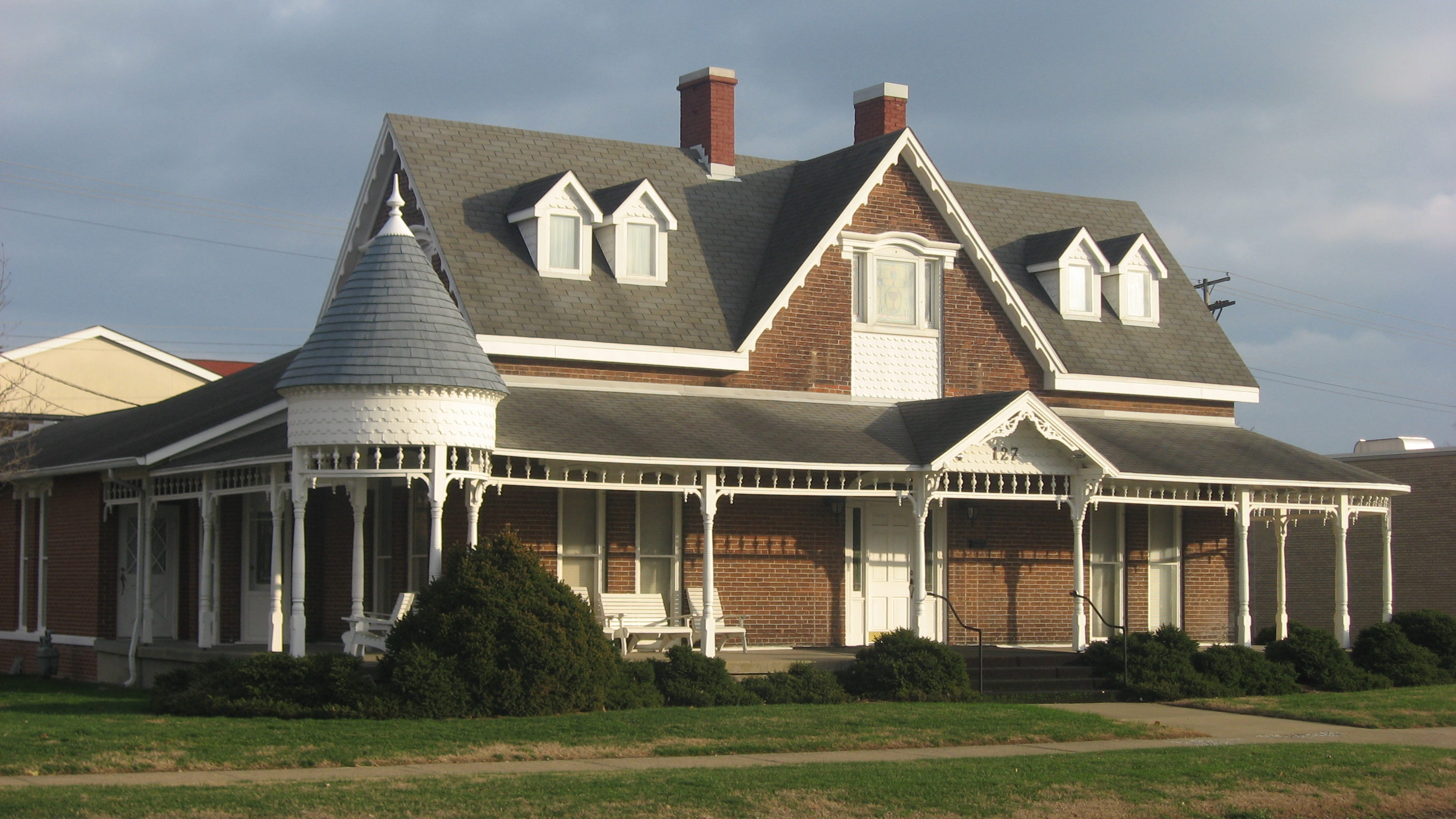
- Blackstone House, December 2011

- Location within Indiana Location within the United States
- Location: 127 S. Main St., Martinsville, Indiana
- Coordinates: 39°25′33″N 86°25′41″W
- Area: less than one acre
- Built: 1860, 1925, 1927
- Architect: Weesner, Walker
- Architectural style: Late Gothic Revival, Tudor Revival, central passage
- NRHP reference No.: 96001540
- Added to NRHP: January 2, 1997

Blackstone House and Martinsville Telephone Company Building, also known as Cure and Hensley Mortuary, consists of two historic buildings located at Martinsville, Indiana. The buildings were connected in the early 1960s. The house was built in 1860, and is a two-story, Gothic Revival style brick building with a steep cross-gable roof. A Queen Anne style wraparound porch with corner turret was added in 1890. The Martinsville Telephone Company Building was built in 1927, and is a one-story, flat roofed, Tudor Revival style "oriental brick" and limestone building. It features a crenellated parapet. It housed a telephone exchange until 1957.

It was listed on the National Register of Historic Places in 1997. It is located in the Martinsville Commercial Historic District.
