= Rogers, Kentucky =

Unincorporated community in Kentucky, United States

- Unincorporated community
- Location within Kentucky
- Coordinates: 37°44′38″N 83°38′08″W
- Country: United States
- State: Kentucky
- County: Wolfe
- Elevation: 1,224 ft (373 m)
- Time zone: UTC-5 (Eastern (EST))
  - Summer (DST): UTC-4 (EDT)
- ZIP code: 41365
- Area code: 606
- GNIS feature ID: 515087

Rogers is an unincorporated community in Wolfe County, Kentucky. Rogers is on Kentucky Route 715 4.9 miles (7.9 km) west of Campton. Rogers has a post office with ZIP code 41365. Rogers Elementary School, a K-6 school in the Wolfe County Schools district, is located in Rogers.

== History ==
A post office has been in operation at Rogers since 1900. The community has the name of early blacksmith Elihu Rogers.
