= Enterprise Association of Regular Baptists =

The Enterprise Association of Regular Baptists is an association of the Regular Baptist Church. Even though they don't have any other Regular Baptist associations that correspond with them in their yearly meetings, they do correspond with two United Baptist associations: one from Salt Rock, West Virginia, and the other from Missouri. They also have relationships between different Free Will Baptist conferences throughout Ohio. The association has a total of 48 member churches, which are scattered through Southern Ohio and Eastern Kentucky. The association was organized in Enterprise (now known as Redbush) Johnson County, Kentucky in 1894 and was incorporated in 1955, after relocating to Gallipolis, Ohio. Different churches originally hosted the association's annual meetings, but in 1995 the Enterprise Association moved its annual meeting place to the Enterprise Baptist Youth Camp in Gallipolis. The association always has their meetings from the first weekend in August (Thursday–Saturday.

== Leadership ==
- Moderator, Dean Ball
- Asst. Moderator, Roger Hill
- Clerk, Charles Tackett Jr.
- Asst. Clerk, Aaron Routte
