= Kentucky Route 77 =

State highway in Kentucky, United States

Kentucky Route 77

Route information
- Maintained by KYTC
- Length: 14.221 mi (22.886 km)

Major junctions
- South end: KY 11 / KY 15 near Slade
- KY 715 in Rural Powell Co
- North end: US 460 in Rural Menifee Co

Location
- Country: United States
- State: Kentucky
- Counties: Powell, Menifee

Highway system
- Kentucky State Highway System; Interstate; US; State; Parkways
| ← KY 76 | → KY 78 |

Kentucky Route 77 (KY 77) is a 14.221-mile (22.886 km) long state highway in Kentucky that runs from Kentucky Route 11 and Kentucky Route 15 northwest of Slade to U.S. Route 460 southeast of Frenchburg.

== Major intersections ==
| County | Location | mi | km | Destinations | Notes |
|---|---|---|---|---|---|
| Powell | | 0.000 | 0.000 | KY 11 / KY 15 (Campton Road) | Southern terminus |
| Menifee | | 5.089 | 8.190 | KY 715 south (Sky Bridge Road) | Northern terminus of KY 715 |
| Menifee | | 14.221 | 22.886 | US 460 | Northern terminus |
1.000 mi = 1.609 km; 1.000 km = 0.621 mi
