= Lee City, Kentucky =

Unincorporated community in Kentucky, United States

Lee City
- Unincorporated community
- Location within the state of Kentucky Lee City (the United States)
- Coordinates: 37°44′21″N 83°19′59″W
- Country: United States
- State: Kentucky
- County: Wolfe
- Elevation: 958 ft (292 m)
- Time zone: UTC-5 (Eastern (EST))
  - Summer (DST): UTC-4 (EDT)
- GNIS feature ID: 496164

Lee City is an unincorporated community in Wolfe County, Kentucky, United States. It lies along Route 205 east of the city of Campton, the county seat of Wolfe County. Its elevation is 958 feet (292 m).

== Notable person ==
- Edgar Tolson, folk artist.
