= Redbush, Kentucky =

Unincorporated community in the United States

- Unincorporated community
- Location within Kentucky Location within the United States
- Coordinates: 37°56′23″N 82°56′57″W
- Country: United States
- State: Kentucky
- County: Johnson
- Elevation: 863 ft (263 m)
- Time zone: UTC-5 (Eastern (EST))
  - Summer (DST): UTC-4 (EDT)
- ZIP codes: 41219
- GNIS feature ID: 508913

Redbush (formerly known as Enterprise) is an unincorporated community in Johnson County, Kentucky, United States. The community's first post office opened in 1904, with William A. Williams as postmaster. Williams also named Redbush after several small pin oaks that turned red in the fall near his post office. The community's ZIP code is 41219.

On October 26, 1894, the Enterprise Association of Regular Baptists was established in Redbush. The town is located at an elevation of 863 feet.

Redbush is the birthplace of musician Billy Adams, a member of the Rockabilly Hall of Fame and recipient of the Kentucky Colonel commission by the State of Kentucky.
