= Adele, Kentucky =

Unincorporated community in Kentucky, United States

- Unincorporated community
- Location within Kentucky Location within the United States
- Coordinates: 37°45′26″N 83°18′4″W
- Country: United States
- State: Kentucky
- County: Morgan
- Elevation: 1,011 ft (308 m)
- Time zone: UTC-5 (Eastern (EST))
  - Summer (DST): UTC-4 (EDT)
- GNIS feature ID: 507376

Adele is an unincorporated community in Morgan County, in the U.S. state of Kentucky.

== History ==
The community's name is an amalgamation of Helen Chase Walbridge, the daughter of a railroad official.
