= Morgan County Courthouse (Kentucky) =

- U.S. National Register of Historic Places
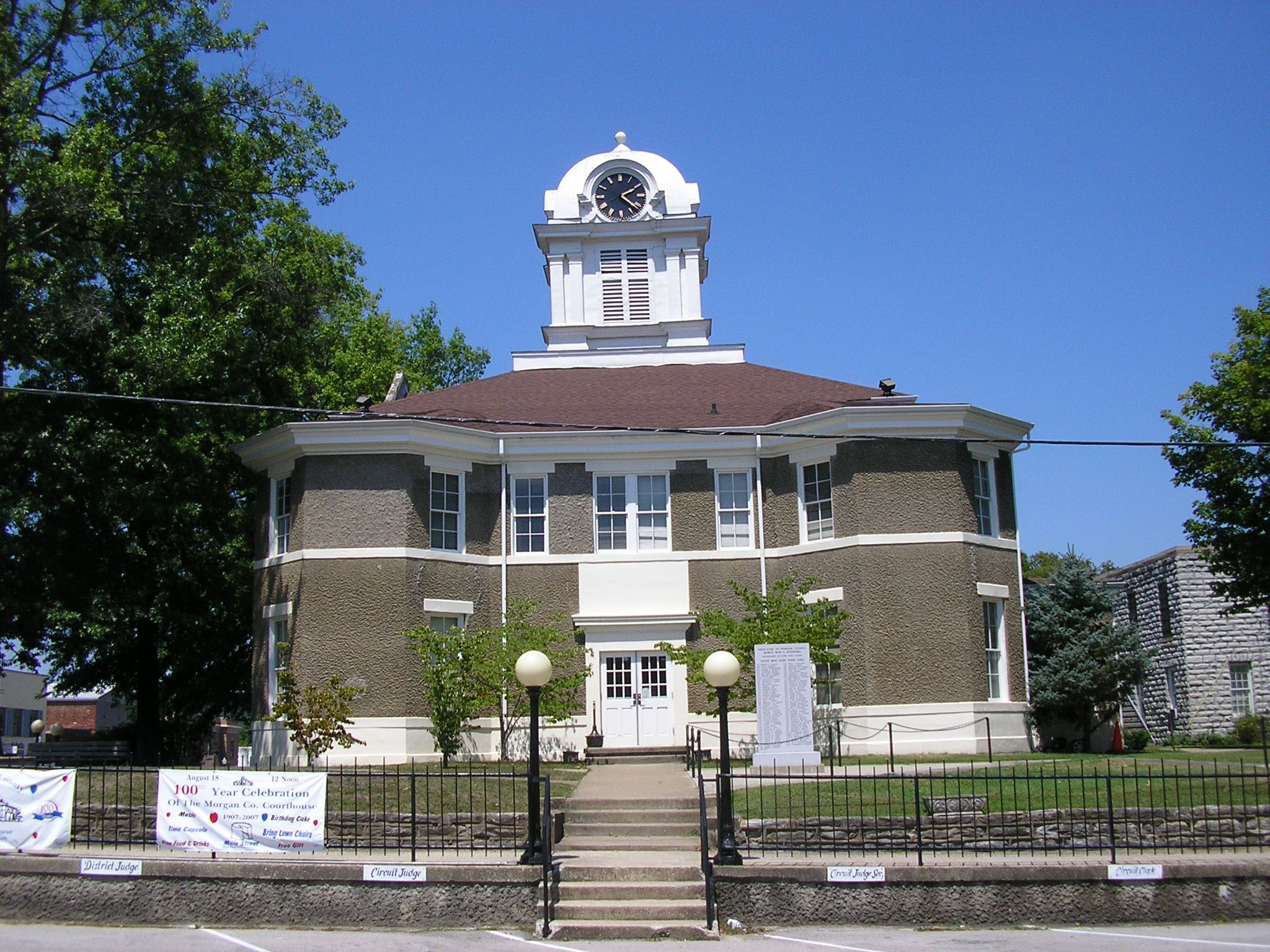

- Location within Kentucky Location within the United States
- Location: Main St., West Liberty, Kentucky
- Coordinates: 37°55′15″N 83°15′22″W
- Area: 0.5 acres (0.20 ha)
- Built: 1907
- NRHP reference No.: 76000929
- Added to NRHP: July 19, 1976

The Morgan County Courthouse in West Liberty, Kentucky was built in 1907 and is the county courthouse of Morgan County, Kentucky. It was listed on the National Register of Historic Places in 1976.

It is built of large precast concrete blocks and its design includes octagonal corner towers.

It is the fourth Morgan County courthouse. The first is believed to have been built of logs or possibly frame. The second was a two-story brick building which was destroyed by fire in 1862 during the American Civil War. The third was also brick, and served until the fourth was built in 1907.
