= Morgan County Courthouse (Indiana) =

- U.S. National Register of Historic Places
- U.S. Historic district – Contributing property
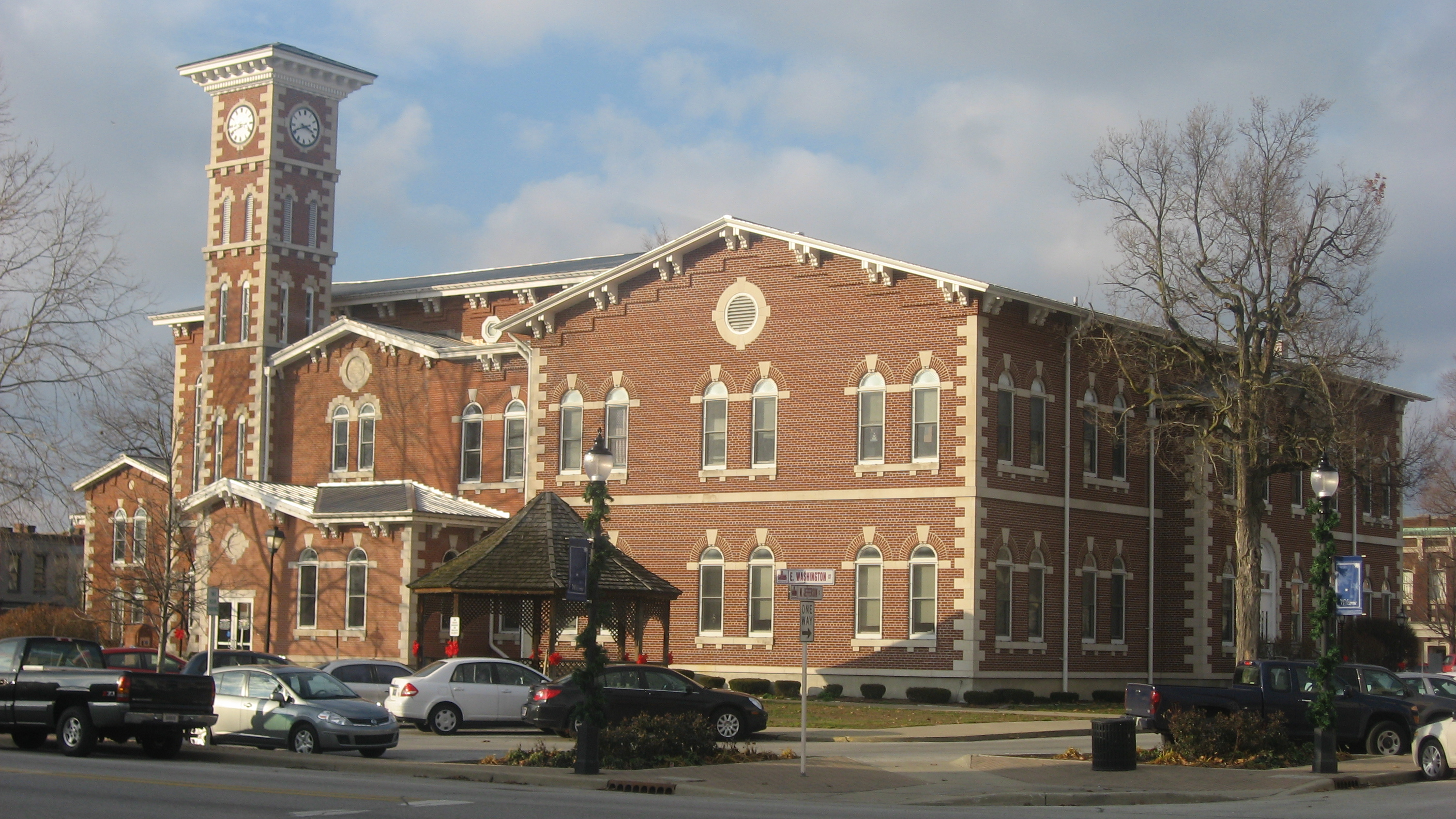
- Morgan County Courthouse, December 2011

- Location within Indiana Location within the United States
- Location: Courthouse Sq., Martinsville, Indiana
- Coordinates: 39°25′39″N 86°25′41″W
- Area: less than one acre
- Built: 1857-1859, 1956, 1975-1976
- Built by: Blankenship, Perry
- Architect: Hodgson, Isaac
- Architectural style: Italianate
- NRHP reference No.: 95001531
- Added to NRHP: January 11, 1996

Morgan County Courthouse is a historic courthouse located in Martinsville, Indiana. It was built between 1857 and 1859, and is a 2 1/2-story, Italianate style brick and stone building. It has a cruciform plan and features a five-level free-standing campanile. Additions were made in 1956 and 1975–1976. Associated with the courthouse is the original annex or Sheriff's House. It is a two-story, five bay by two-bay, I-house.

It was listed on the National Register of Historic Places in 1996. It is located in the Martinsville Commercial Historic District.
