= Pine Ridge, Kentucky =

Unincorporated community in Kentucky, United States

Pine Ridge
- Unincorporated community
- Location within the state of Kentucky Pine Ridge (the United States)
- Coordinates: 37°45′50″N 83°36′50″W
- Country: United States
- State: Kentucky
- County: Wolfe
- Elevation: 1,266 ft (386 m)
- Time zone: UTC-5 (Eastern (EST))
  - Summer (DST): UTC-4 (EDT)
- ZIP codes: 41360
- GNIS feature ID: 514598

Pine Ridge is an unincorporated community in Wolfe County, Kentucky, United States. It lies along Route 15 northwest of the city of Campton, the county seat of Wolfe County. Its elevation is 1,266 feet (386 m). The community has a ZIP code of 41360.
