= Wilhurst, Kentucky =

Unincorporated community in Kentucky, United States

Wilhurst
- Unincorporated community
- Location within the state of Kentucky Wilhurst (the United States)
- Coordinates: 37°37′58″N 83°24′53″W
- Country: United States
- State: Kentucky
- County: Breathitt
- Elevation: 735 ft (224 m)
- Time zone: UTC-6 (Central (CST))
  - Summer (DST): UTC-5 (CST)
- GNIS feature ID: 509371

Wilhurst is an unincorporated community and coal town in Breathitt County, Kentucky, United States.
