= Helechawa, Kentucky =

Unincorporated community in Kentucky, United States

Helechawa
- Unincorporated community
- Location within the state of Kentucky Helechawa (the United States)
- Coordinates: 37°45′57″N 83°20′22″W
- Country: United States
- State: Kentucky
- County: Wolfe
- Elevation: 1,001 ft (305 m)
- Time zone: UTC-5 (Eastern (EST))
  - Summer (DST): UTC-4 (EST)
- ZIP codes: 41334
- GNIS feature ID: 508219

Helechawa is an unincorporated community in Wolfe County, Kentucky, United States.

The town of Helechawa was established in 1901 along the route of the Ohio and Kentucky Railroad. The president of the railway coined the name from that of his daughter, Helen Chas Walbridge. The folklore behind the name comes from civil war times. Meaning hell each way Its post office has since closed.
