= Hazel Green, Kentucky =

Census-designated place in Kentucky, United States

Hazel Green
- Unincorporated community & census-designated place
- Nickname: Trimble's Store
- Location within the state of Kentucky Hazel Green (the United States)
- Coordinates: 37°47′51″N 83°25′0″W
- Country: United States
- State: Kentucky
- County: Wolfe

Area
  - Total: 1.08 sq mi (2.79 km^{2})
  - Land: 1.08 sq mi (2.79 km^{2})
  - Water: 0.0039 sq mi (0.01 km^{2})
- Elevation: 922 ft (281 m)

Population (2020)
  - Total: 173
  - Density: 161/sq mi (62.1/km^{2})
- Time zone: UTC-5 (Eastern (EST))
  - Summer (DST): UTC-4 (EDT)
- ZIP codes: 41332
- FIPS code: 21-35398
- GNIS feature ID: 493953

Hazel Green (also Trimbles Store) is a census-designated place and unincorporated community in Wolfe County, Kentucky, United States. As of the 2020 census, Hazel Green had a population of 173. It lies along Routes 191 and 205 northeast of the city of Campton, the county seat of Wolfe County. Its elevation is 922 feet (281 m). It has a post office with the ZIP code 41332.

A post office was established as Hazle Green [sic] in 1829, and named for the hazel shrubs prevalent in the area. The name of the post office was officially changed to its present spelling in 1889.

== Demographics ==
Historical population
Census	Pop.	Note	%±
2020	173		—
U.S. Decennial Census

== Notable people ==
- Joseph L. Bristow, U.S. senator from Kansas, born in Hazel Green
- Pete Center, baseball player.
- South Trimble U.S. House of Representatives -Longest serving Clerk of the House of Representatives
- Hugh Holland 1970s Californian skateboard photographer
