= Campton, Kentucky =

- City
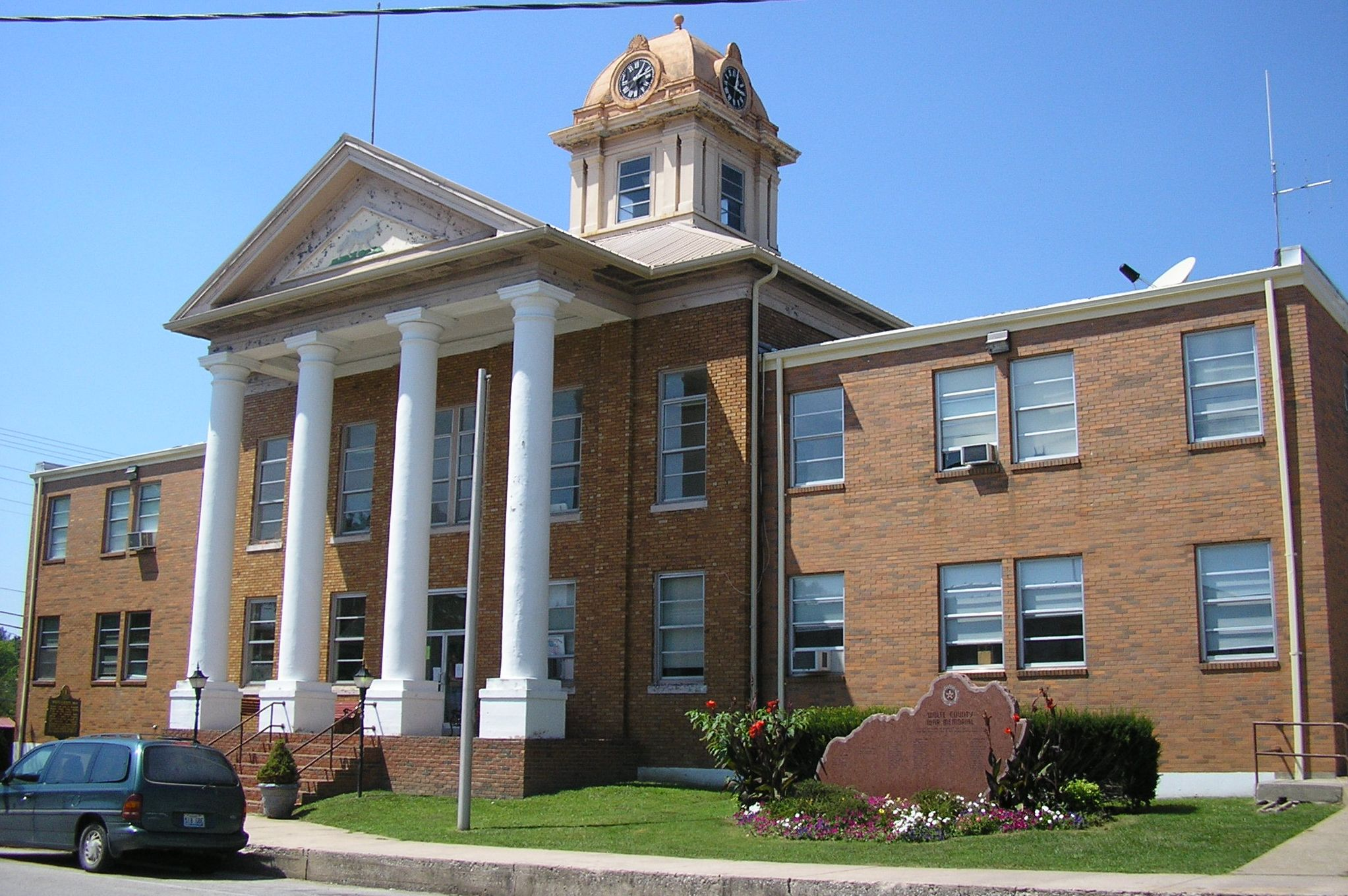
- Wolfe County courthouse in Campton

- Location of Campton in Wolfe County, Kentucky.
- Coordinates: 37°44′5″N 83°32′54″W
- Country: United States
- State: Kentucky
- County: Wolfe
- Incorporated: March 17, 1870

Government
  - Type: City Commission
  - Mayor: Katherine May

Area
  - Total: 1.00 sq mi (2.59 km^{2})
  - Land: 1.00 sq mi (2.59 km^{2})
  - Water: 0 sq mi (0.00 km^{2})
- Elevation: 961 ft (293 m)

Population (2020)
  - Total: 316
  - Density: 316.3/sq mi (122.11/km^{2})
- Time zone: UTC-5 (Eastern (EST))
  - Summer (DST): UTC-4 (EDT)
- ZIP codes: 41301, 41342
- Area code: 606
- FIPS code: 21-12358
- GNIS feature ID: 0511172

Campton is a home rule-class city in and the county seat of Wolfe County, Kentucky, United States. As of the 2020 census, Campton had a population of 316.

== History ==
Campton was a camp town with a small creek, Swift Creek (named after Jonathan Swift of the legend of Swift's silver mine), running through the town. Swift supposedly buried treasure in the area which has never been recovered.

== Geography ==
Campton is located at 37°44′05″N 83°32′54″W.

According to the United States Census Bureau, the city has a total area of 1.1 square miles (2.8 km^{2}), of which 1.1 square miles (2.8 km^{2}) is land and 0.04 square miles (0.10 km^{2}) (3.57%) is water.

== Demographics ==
Historical population
Census	Pop.	Note	%±
1870	67		—
1880	102		52.2%
1890	317		210.8%
1900	276		−12.9%
1910	326		18.1%
1920	277		−15.0%
1930	337		21.7%
1940	418		24.0%
1950	431		3.1%
1960	484		12.3%
1970	419		−13.4%
1980	486		16.0%
1990	484		−0.4%
2000	424		−12.4%
2010	441		4.0%
2020	316		−28.3%
U.S. Decennial Census

As of the census of 2000, there were 424 people, 196 households, and 117 families residing in the city. The population density was 393.4 inhabitants per square mile (151.9/km^{2}). There were 229 housing units at an average density of 212.5 per square mile (82.0/km^{2}). The racial makeup of the city was 99.76% White, and 0.24% from two or more races. Hispanic or Latino of any race were 0.71% of the population.

There were 196 households, out of which 28.6% had children under the age of 18 living with them, 41.8% were married couples living together, 16.3% had a female householder with no husband present, and 40.3% were non-families. 37.2% of all households were made up of individuals, and 14.3% had someone living alone who was 65 years of age or older. The average household size was 2.16 and the average family size was 2.85.

In the city, the population was spread out, with 22.4% under the age of 18, 10.4% from 18 to 24, 28.1% from 25 to 44, 23.8% from 45 to 64, and 15.3% who were 65 years of age or older. The median age was 38 years. For every 100 females, there were 88.4 males. For every 100 females age 18 and over, there were 84.8 males.

The median income for a household in the city was $17,778, and the median income for a family was $21,528. Males had a median income of $24,375 versus $21,875 for females. The per capita income for the city was $11,167. About 31.8% of families and 34.6% of the population were below the poverty line, including 47.4% of those under age 18 and 23.6% of those age 65 or over.

== Education ==
Campton has a lending library, the Wolfe County Public Library.

== Arts and culture ==
The annual Swift Silver Mine Festival is held on Labor Day weekend each year. It includes a parade and vendors in the downtown area.

== Notable people ==
- Folk artist Edgar Tolson; Ralph Rinzler of the Smithsonian Institution was impressed by Tolson's figures, and included them in the 1971 Festival of American Folklife.
- Folk artist Randy Spencer; Well known folk artist and creator of Kentucky Walking Sticks.
- Tyler Booth, Country singer, grew up near the city Campton, Kentucky, population 424, on a farm where he begin playing guitar and writing songs from an early age. Booth signed a major record deal with Sony Music Nashville in early 2020. His voice and song writing talents were discovered while attending college at Morehead State University his freshman year.
