= Morgan County, Kentucky =

County in Kentucky, United States

- County
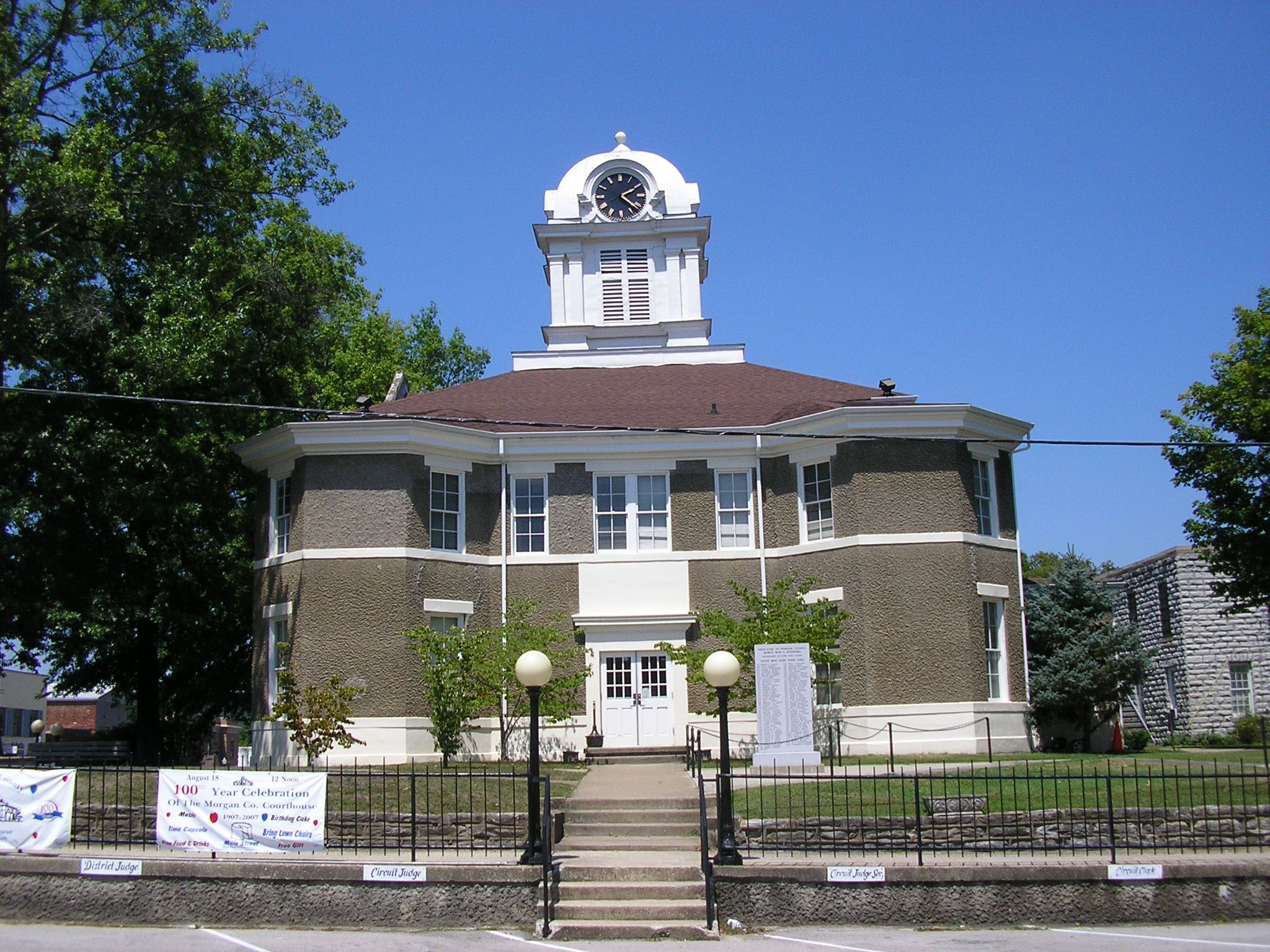
- Morgan County courthouse in West Liberty

- Location within the U.S. state of Kentucky
- Coordinates: 37°55′N 83°16′W
- Country: United States
- State: Kentucky
- Founded: December 7, 1822
- Named for: Daniel Morgan
- Seat: West Liberty
- Largest city: West Liberty

Government
  - Judge/Executive: Jim Gazay (R)

Area
  - Total: 384 sq mi (990 km^{2})
  - Land: 381 sq mi (990 km^{2})
  - Water: 2.7 sq mi (7.0 km^{2}) 0.7%

Population (2020)
  - Total: 13,726
  - Estimate (2025): 14,415 ▲
  - Density: 36.0/sq mi (13.9/km^{2})
- Time zone: UTC−5 (Eastern)
  - Summer (DST): UTC−4 (EDT)
- Congressional district: 5th
- Website: morgancounty.ky.gov

Morgan County is a county located in the U.S. state of Kentucky. As of the 2020 census, the population was 13,726. Its county seat is West Liberty.

== History ==
Morgan County was formed on December 7, 1822, from portions of Bath County and Floyd County. It was named for Daniel Morgan, a distinguished general in the American Revolutionary War.

The first white settler in the county was Daniel Williams, a traveling preacher from Virginia who built the first permanent home in the vicinity several miles south of present-day West Liberty. Williams had also previously served in the American Revolution in the Kentucky Militia.

During the Civil War, Morgan County was a majority Pro-Confederate County. 220 Morgan County men served as Union Soldiers, while nearly 400 or more served as Confederate soldiers. Morgan County men formed nearly all of A, B, C and parts of D and E. companies of the 5th KY Infantry. (CSA)

On May 29, 1869, a portion of Morgan County became part of present-day Menifee County.

Morgan County was hit by a devastating EF3 tornado during a widespread and deadly tornado outbreak on March 2, 2012. The county seat was the most heavily impacted area by the tornado, as monetary costs within West Liberty and Morgan County reached up to $75 million (2012 USD). Six out of eleven people (including one direct death) were killed within the county by the tornado.

In May 2015, Morgan County was sued for $1 million (2015 USD) by Emergency Disaster Services (EDS), a Lexington-based emergency relief company the county rented various amounts of equipment and apparatus from following the 2012 tornado. EDS demanded to be paid by the county, but officials of Morgan County claimed EDS owner Jerry Lundergan, a former Kentucky Democratic Party chairman, was price gouging for the rented equipment and repairs throughout the area. They also claimed Lundergan struck shady business deal with Timothy Alexander Conley, the county's former judge-executive who was sentenced in 2014 to seven years in a federal prison following various counts of fraud, money laundering, bid rigging and kickbacks.

== Geography ==
According to the United States Census Bureau, the county has a total area of 384 square miles (990 km^{2}), of which 300 square miles (780 km^{2}) is land and 2.7 square miles (7.0 km^{2}) (0.7%) is water.

=== Adjacent counties ===
- Rowan County (northwest)
- Elliott County (north)
- Lawrence County (northeast)
- Johnson County (east)
- Magoffin County (southeast)
- Wolfe County (southwest)
- Menifee County (west)

=== National protected area ===
- Daniel Boone National Forest (part)

== Demographics ==
Historical population
| Census | Pop. | Note | %± |
|---|---|---|---|
| 1830 | 2,857 | | — |
| 1840 | 4,603 | | 61.1% |
| 1850 | 7,620 | | 65.5% |
| 1860 | 9,237 | | 21.2% |
| 1870 | 5,975 | | −35.3% |
| 1880 | 8,455 | | 41.5% |
| 1890 | 11,249 | | 33.0% |
| 1900 | 12,792 | | 13.7% |
| 1910 | 16,259 | | 27.1% |
| 1920 | 16,518 | | 1.6% |
| 1930 | 15,130 | | −8.4% |
| 1940 | 16,827 | | 11.2% |
| 1950 | 13,624 | | −19.0% |
| 1960 | 11,056 | | −18.8% |
| 1970 | 10,019 | | −9.4% |
| 1980 | 12,103 | | 20.8% |
| 1990 | 11,648 | | −3.8% |
| 2000 | 13,948 | | 19.7% |
| 2010 | 13,923 | | −0.2% |
| 2020 | 13,726 | | −1.4% |
| 2025 (est.) | 14,415 | ▲ | 5.0% |
U.S. Decennial Census; 1790-1960 1900-1990; 1990-2000 2010-2020

=== 2020 census ===
As of the 2020 census, the county had a population of 13,726. The median age was 41.2 years. 20.6% of residents were under the age of 18 and 16.3% of residents were 65 years of age or older. For every 100 females there were 130.2 males, and for every 100 females age 18 and over there were 133.9 males age 18 and over.

The racial makeup of the county was 91.6% White, 3.6% Black or African American, 0.1% American Indian and Alaska Native, 0.1% Asian, 0.0% Native Hawaiian and Pacific Islander, 0.5% from some other race, and 4.0% from two or more races. Hispanic or Latino residents of any race comprised 3.0% of the population.

0.0% of residents lived in urban areas, while 100.0% lived in rural areas.

There were 4,841 households in the county, of which 31.0% had children under the age of 18 living with them and 24.4% had a female householder with no spouse or partner present. About 27.0% of all households were made up of individuals and 13.1% had someone living alone who was 65 years of age or older.

There were 5,610 housing units, of which 13.7% were vacant. Among occupied housing units, 77.5% were owner-occupied and 22.5% were renter-occupied. The homeowner vacancy rate was 1.3% and the rental vacancy rate was 7.0%.

=== 2000 census ===
As of the census of 2000, there were 13,948 people, 4,752 households, and 3,568 families residing in the county. The population density was 37 per square mile (14/km^{2}). There were 5,487 housing units at an average density of 14 per square mile (5.4/km^{2}). The racial makeup of the county was 94.59% White, 4.38% Black or African American, 0.15% Native American, 0.16% Asian, 0.01% Pacific Islander, 0.06% from other races, and 0.65% from two or more races. 0.61% of the population were Hispanic or Latino of any race.

There were 4,752 households, out of which 34.80% had children under the age of 18 living with them, 62.40% were married couples living together, 9.20% had a female householder with no husband present, and 24.90% were non-families. 22.60% of all households were made up of individuals, and 10.30% had someone living alone who was 65 years of age or older. The average household size was 2.55 and the average family size was 2.97.

In the county, the population was spread out, with 22.40% under the age of 18, 10.60% from 18 to 24, 32.90% from 25 to 44, 22.30% from 45 to 64, and 11.80% who were 65 years of age or older. The median age was 36 years. For every 100 females there were 123.30 males. For every 100 females age 18 and over, there were 128.40 males.

The median income for a household in the county was $21,869, and the median income for a family was $26,135. Males had a median income of $23,966 versus $18,463 for females. The per capita income for the county was $12,657. 27.20% of the population and 23.50% of families were below the poverty line. Out of the total people living in poverty, 33.90% are under the age of 18 and 28.50% are 65 or older.

== Politics ==
United States presidential election results for Morgan County, Kentucky
| Year | Republican | | Democratic | | Third party(ies) | |
| Year | No. | % | No. | % | No. | % |
|---|---|---|---|---|---|---|
| 1912 | 876 | 29.94% | 1,800 | 61.52% | 250 | 8.54% |
| 1916 | 1,123 | 32.43% | 2,319 | 66.97% | 21 | 0.61% |
| 1920 | 1,802 | 34.88% | 3,347 | 64.79% | 17 | 0.33% |
| 1924 | 1,805 | 35.09% | 3,311 | 64.37% | 28 | 0.54% |
| 1928 | 2,025 | 44.02% | 2,575 | 55.98% | 0 | 0.00% |
| 1932 | 1,435 | 25.70% | 4,137 | 74.09% | 12 | 0.21% |
| 1936 | 1,269 | 28.01% | 3,256 | 71.86% | 6 | 0.13% |
| 1940 | 1,509 | 26.67% | 4,148 | 73.33% | 0 | 0.00% |
| 1944 | 1,217 | 27.26% | 3,242 | 72.63% | 5 | 0.11% |
| 1948 | 987 | 21.94% | 3,488 | 77.53% | 24 | 0.53% |
| 1952 | 1,311 | 29.29% | 3,161 | 70.62% | 4 | 0.09% |
| 1956 | 1,878 | 37.20% | 3,164 | 62.68% | 6 | 0.12% |
| 1960 | 1,718 | 37.12% | 2,910 | 62.88% | 0 | 0.00% |
| 1964 | 546 | 14.05% | 3,293 | 84.72% | 48 | 1.23% |
| 1968 | 1,341 | 33.86% | 2,222 | 56.10% | 398 | 10.05% |
| 1972 | 1,535 | 45.56% | 1,815 | 53.87% | 19 | 0.56% |
| 1976 | 973 | 24.97% | 2,897 | 74.34% | 27 | 0.69% |
| 1980 | 1,450 | 34.53% | 2,698 | 64.25% | 51 | 1.21% |
| 1984 | 1,834 | 42.36% | 2,481 | 57.30% | 15 | 0.35% |
| 1988 | 1,452 | 38.04% | 2,329 | 61.02% | 36 | 0.94% |
| 1992 | 1,239 | 28.09% | 2,655 | 60.19% | 517 | 11.72% |
| 1996 | 1,439 | 38.94% | 1,843 | 49.88% | 413 | 11.18% |
| 2000 | 2,295 | 54.13% | 1,875 | 44.22% | 70 | 1.65% |
| 2004 | 2,682 | 50.87% | 2,532 | 48.03% | 58 | 1.10% |
| 2008 | 2,396 | 54.72% | 1,879 | 42.91% | 104 | 2.37% |
| 2012 | 3,021 | 67.55% | 1,369 | 30.61% | 82 | 1.83% |
| 2016 | 3,628 | 75.98% | 1,006 | 21.07% | 141 | 2.95% |
| 2020 | 4,301 | 77.58% | 1,175 | 21.19% | 68 | 1.23% |
| 2024 | 4,353 | 80.94% | 939 | 17.46% | 86 | 1.60% |

Morgan County a historically Democratic county, with the party's candidate winning it in every presidential election until 2000, when George W. Bush became the first Republican to ever carry the county. In the 21st century, like almost all of Kentucky, the county has flipped to the Republicans in most elections.

=== Elected officials ===
Elected officials as of January 3, 2025
| U.S. House | Hal Rogers (R) | KY 5 |
| Ky. Senate | Brandon Smith (R) | 30 |
| Ky. House | Richard White (R) | 99 |

== Communities ==
=== City ===
- West Liberty (county seat)

=== Census-designated place ===
- Ezel

=== Other unincorporated places ===
- Caney
- Cannel City
- Cottle
- Crockett
- Dingus
- Elamton
- Elkfork
- Grassy Creek
- Lenox
- Malone
- Maytown
- Mima
- Mize
- Moon
- Ophir
- Relief
- Stacy Fork
- White Oak
- Wrigley
- Yocum
- Zag

== See also ==
- National Register of Historic Places listings in Morgan County, Kentucky
