= West Liberty, Kentucky =

- City
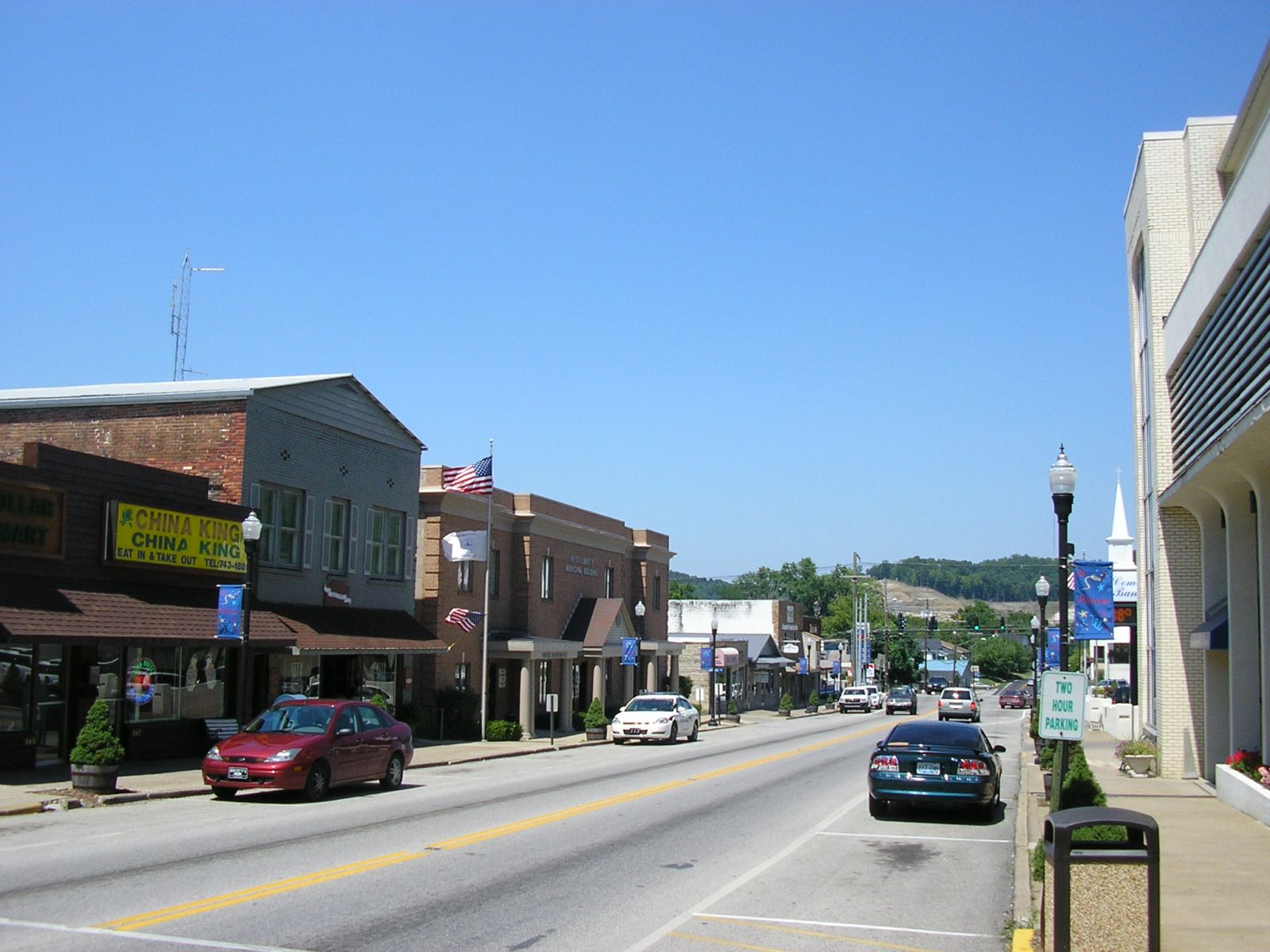
- Downtown West Liberty, 2007

- Location in Morgan County, Kentucky
- Coordinates: 37°54′59″N 83°15′41″W
- Country: United States
- State: Kentucky
- County: Morgan

Area
  - Total: 4.94 sq mi (12.79 km^{2})
  - Land: 4.90 sq mi (12.70 km^{2})
  - Water: 0.035 sq mi (0.09 km^{2})
- Elevation: 817 ft (249 m)

Population (2020)
  - Total: 3,215
  - Estimate (2024): 3,257
  - Density: 655.6/sq mi (253.12/km^{2})
- Time zone: UTC-5 (Eastern (EST))
  - Summer (DST): UTC-4 (EDT)
- ZIP code: 41472
- Area code: 606
- FIPS code: 21-81858
- GNIS feature ID: 0516279
- Website: www.cityofwestliberty.com

West Liberty is a home rule-class city in Morgan County, Kentucky, United States. It is the county seat of Morgan County. As of the 2020 census, the city population was 3,215. It is located along the Licking River at the junction of Kentucky Route 7 and U.S. Route 460.

== History ==
By 1816, an early settlement at the town site was called "Wells Mills". When Morgan County was founded in 1823, the settlement was incorporated to become the county seat. It chose the name "West Liberty" in the belief that Pikeville, Kentucky, would be called "Liberty" when it incorporated. West Liberty is actually 100 miles (160 km) east of Liberty, Kentucky.

Three Civil War skirmishes were fought near West Liberty, and much of the town was burned during the war, including the courthouse. It was replaced after the war, and a fourth courthouse was built in 1907.

=== 2012 tornado ===
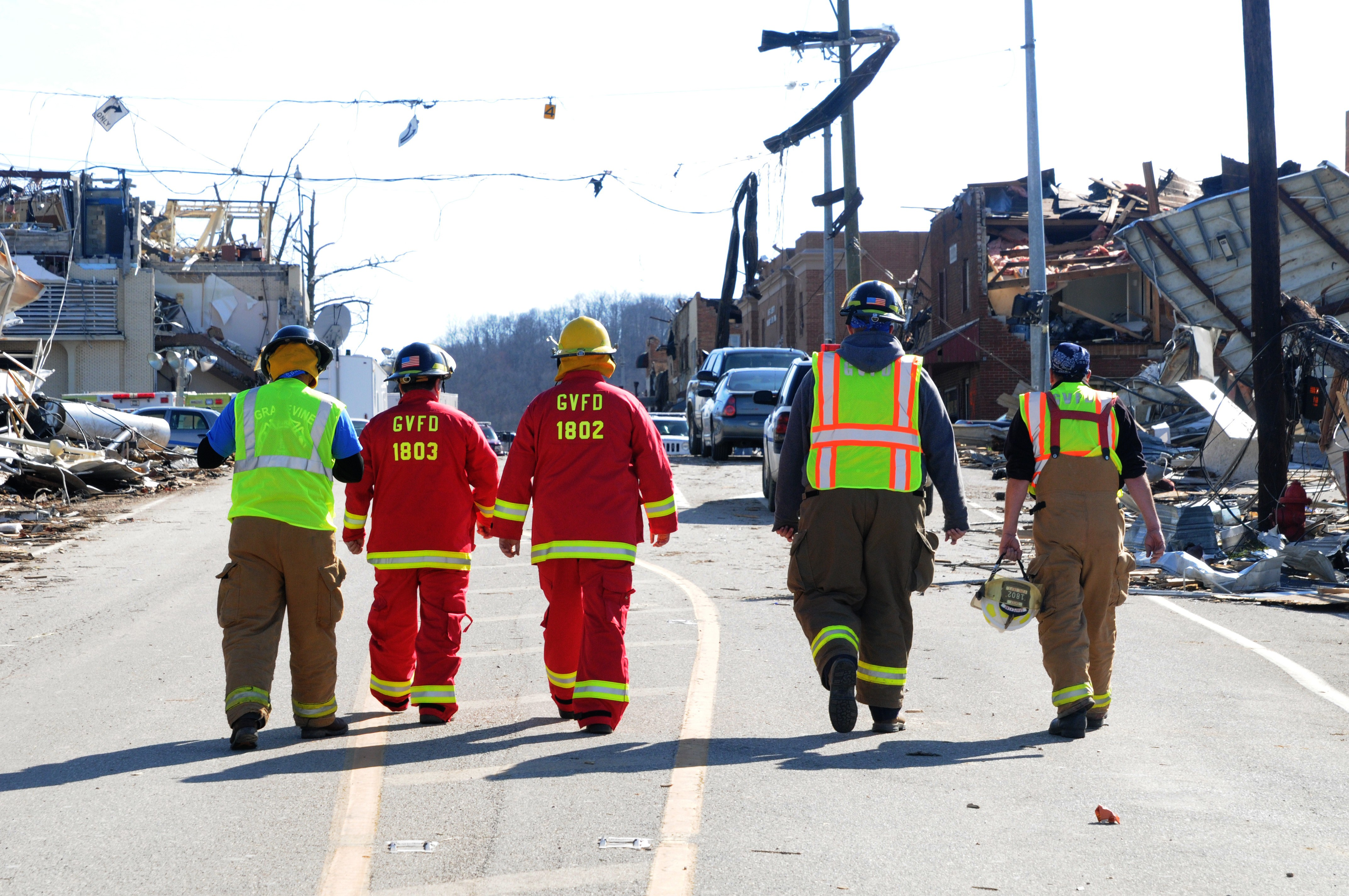
Firefighters from the Grape Vine Fire Department assist local and state law enforcement officials, along with Kentucky National Guard members, in relief efforts taking place in West Liberty following the 2012 tornado.

On March 2, 2012, West Liberty was hit by an EF3 tornado, which caused extensive damage to the downtown area. This tornado left a swath of damage over a mile wide. Many homes and businesses were heavily damaged or destroyed. Six people were killed and at least 75 people were injured. Preliminary assessments from emergency officials and media indicated a path length of 60 miles (97 km), though a National Weather Service survey concluded the tornado travelled 85 miles from Menifee County to Lincoln County, West Virginia. It had the longest track of any tornado in the United States in 2012.

The old courthouse, built in 1907, as well as the new courthouse which was 60% completed were at first, after the tornado, both deemed as a total loss. However, this determination was in error as both buildings have been restored and finished, respectively.

The tornado had also hit the city of Wellington in Menifee County and was just north of the EF3 tornado that hit Salyersville around 7:00 PM Eastern time that evening. The tornadoes were the worst in the history of all three of the towns.

=== Restoration after tornado ===
Since the 2012 tornado, much progress has been made in West Liberty. Many of the buildings destroyed in the disaster have been either rebuilt to prior state or have been replaced with much better structures. Planning in West Liberty has been continuous since the disaster.

== Geography ==
West Liberty is located in central Morgan County at 37°54′59″N 83°15′41″W (37.916320, -83.261386). It is within the state's eastern region foothills, about 20 miles (32 km) southeast of Cave Run Lake and Daniel Boone National Forest and the same distance west of the upstream end of Paintsville Lake.

U.S. Route 460 passes through the center of West Liberty, leading west 27 miles (43 km) to Frenchburg and southeast 22 miles (35 km) to Salyersville. Kentucky Route 7 joins US 460 leading to Salyersville but turns north in the center of West Liberty and leads 18 miles (29 km) to Sandy Hook.

According to the United States Census Bureau, the city has a total area of 4.94 square miles (12.8 km^{2}), of which 0.03 square miles (0.08 km^{2}), or 0.67%, are water. The Licking River passes through the city along the west side of the downtown, flowing northwest to join the Ohio River at Covington.

== Demographics ==
Historical population
Census	Pop.	Note	%±
1870	142		—
1880	225		58.5%
1890	234		4.0%
1900	205		−12.4%
1910	442		115.6%
1920	461		4.3%
1930	569		23.4%
1940	573		0.7%
1950	931		62.5%
1960	1,165		25.1%
1970	1,387		19.1%
1980	1,381		−0.4%
1990	1,887		36.6%
2000	3,277		73.7%
2010	3,435		4.8%
2020	3,215		−6.4%
2024 (est.)	3,257		1.3%
U.S. Decennial Census

=== 2020 census ===
As of the 2020 census, West Liberty had a population of 3,215. The median age was 37.6 years. 10.7% of residents were under the age of 18 and 11.0% of residents were 65 years of age or older. For every 100 females there were 305.4 males, and for every 100 females age 18 and over there were 360.3 males age 18 and over.

0.0% of residents lived in urban areas, while 100.0% lived in rural areas.

There were 624 households in West Liberty, of which 26.9% had children under the age of 18 living in them. Of all households, 40.2% were married-couple households, 15.2% were households with a male householder and no spouse or partner present, and 37.5% were households with a female householder and no spouse or partner present. About 35.1% of all households were made up of individuals and 16.9% had someone living alone who was 65 years of age or older.

There were 682 housing units, of which 8.5% were vacant. The homeowner vacancy rate was 1.2% and the rental vacancy rate was 8.0%.

Racial composition as of the 2020 census
Race	Number	Percent
White	2,332	72.5%
Black or African American	469	14.6%
American Indian and Alaska Native	5	0.2%
Asian	11	0.3%
Native Hawaiian and Other Pacific Islander	2	0.1%
Some other race	63	2.0%
Two or more races	333	10.4%
Hispanic or Latino (of any race)	350	10.9%

=== 2000 census ===
As of the census of 2000, there were 3,277 people, 696 households, and 446 families residing in the city. The population density was 739.3 inhabitants per square mile (285.4/km^{2}). There were 758 housing units at an average density of 171.0 per square mile (66.0/km^{2}). The racial makeup of the city was 79.43% White, 18.19% African American, 0.40% Native American, 0.21% Asian, 0.06% Pacific Islander, 0.21% from other races, and 1.50% from two or more races. Hispanic or Latino of any race were 1.25% of the population. (Both the large increase in population after 1990 and the current demographic diversity are the result of the opening of the Eastern Kentucky Correctional Complex).

There were 696 households, out of which 27.6% had children under the age of 18 living with them, 47.7% were married couples living together, 14.1% had a female householder with no husband present, and 35.8% were non-families. 32.8% of all households were made up of individuals, and 14.7% had someone living alone who was 65 years of age or older. The average household size was 2.15 and the average family size was 2.71.

In the city, the population was spread out, with 10.1% under the age of 18, 14.8% from 18 to 24, 44.2% from 25 to 44, 19.4% from 45 to 64, and 11.5% who were 65 years of age or older. The median age was 36 years. For every 100 females, there were 264.5 males. For every 100 females age 18 and over, there were 297.4 males.

The median income for a household in the city was $21,429, and the median income for a family was $30,875. Males had a median income of $25,417 versus $19,464 for females. The per capita income for the city was $11,215. About 25.7% of families and 28.6% of the population were below the poverty line, including 41.6% of those under age 18 and 26.4% of those age 65 or over.

== Economy ==
West Liberty is home to the Eastern Kentucky Correctional Complex. An extended campus of Morehead State University and University of Kentucky's Regional Technology Center are both located within the town.

The area is also home to Rod and Staff Publishing, a Mennonite Bible literature printing facility, located at Crockett.

== Education ==
Morgan County has four elementary schools. These are Ezel, East Valley, Morgan Central, and Wrigley Elementary. It has one middle school, Morgan County Middle; and one high school, Morgan County High School.

West Liberty has a lending library, a branch of the Montgomery County Public Library.

== Arts and culture ==
West Liberty celebrates the annual Sorghum Festival on the last full weekend of September. The 2015 festival marked the festival's 45th year, with upwards of 50,000 visitors expected. The festival features a large variety of Appalachian crafts, folk art, food, and sundry items for sale and/or show. The entire downtown section is cordoned off with Main Street as the center of activity. The festival is host to two Civil War reenactments, which take place at the soccer field.

The Bluegrass Festival began in 1996, and showcases both local and regional bluegrass acts. It takes place at Old Mill Park, and visitors can enjoy a wide selection of food and local vendor booths.
