= George S. Davis =

American singer-songwriter (1906–1992)

- Historical photo of George S. Davis

Background information
- Also known as: The Singing Miner
- Born: August 19, 1906; La Follette, Tennessee, United States
- Origin: Hazard, Kentucky, United States
- Died: November 3, 1992 (aged 86) London, Kentucky, United States
- Genres: American Folk; Struggle & Protest
- Occupations: Disc jockey, singer-songwriter
- Instruments: Guitar, fiddle, vocals
- Years active: 1933–1992
- Label: Folkways

George S. Davis (August 19, 1906 – November 11, 1992), known as The Singing Miner, was an American folk singer and songwriter, who worked as a coal miner, and then as a disc jockey on local radio in Hazard, Kentucky from 1947 until 1969.

== Career ==
Davis began his career about 1933, about the same time the United Mine Workers of America began organizing the coal mines in Eastern Kentucky.

Among the songs he wrote and sang were "White Shotgun," "Buggerman in the Bushes," "Coal Miner's Boogie," "When Kentucky Had No Union Men," and "Harlan County Blues."

"Sixteen Tons", the song about the misery of coal mining, is credited as being written in 1946 by country singer Merle Travis, who was the first to record it. However, Davis much later claimed that Travis based it on a song of his called "Nine-to-ten tons" (or, in some tellings, "Twenty-One Tons") written in the 1930s. There is no supporting evidence for Davis' claim. Davis' 1966 recording of his version of the song can be heard on the album George Davis: When Kentucky Had No Union Men.

== Death and legacy ==
Davis was 86 years old when he died in 1992 in London, Kentucky, United States. His D28 Martin Guitar that he played from 1947 until 1992 was displayed in the new studios of WKIC and WSGS on Main Street in Hazard.
