= North Fork tributaries at Hazard, Kentucky =

Physical characteristics
- Source: First Creek headwaters
  - coordinates: 37°18′48″N 83°11′43″W
- 2nd source: Combs Fork headwaters
  - coordinates: 37°14′26″N 83°07′49″W
- 3rd source: Walker Branch headwaters
  - coordinates: 37°15′00″N 83°09′35″W
- 4th source: Davidson Branch headwaters
  - coordinates: 37°13′24″N 83°11′28″W
- 5th source: Gregory Branch headwaters
  - coordinates: 37°14′31″N 83°09′21″W

The North Fork Kentucky River has several tributary creeks at, or in the immediate vicinity of, the city of Hazard, Kentucky. They were surveyed by the Kentucky Geological Survey in 1918. Most still exist, although some have since been eliminated by mining and the subsequent expansion of the city, and the post-World War 2 construction of the Daniel Boone Parkway.

Many locations were separate places in the early 20th century, and were gradually annexed by Hazard as it grew.

== Tributaries and other locations ==
- The North Fork Kentucky River's major tributaries in this vicinity († denoting creeks that are no longer extant) include:
  - Lower Second Creek, mouth at 37°17′14″N 83°16′10″W headwaters at 37°19′08″N 83°13′34″W
  - First Creek, 6 miles (9.7 km) long, mouth at 37°16′33″N 83°15′17″W
    - Bee Branch† 1.75 miles (2.82 km) upstream at altitude 905 feet (276 m)
    - Peter Branch† 2.5 miles (4.0 km) upstream at altitude 955 feet (291 m)
    - Wolf Pen Branch† 3 miles (4.8 km) upstream at altitude 970 feet (300 m)
    - White Oak Branch† 3.625 miles (5.834 km) upstream at altitude 1,000 feet (300 m)
    - Road Branch† 3.875 miles (6.236 km) upstream at altitude 1,025 feet (312 m)
  - Lotts Creek, mouth at 37°16′57″N 83°11′33″W, whose further tributaries and locations are in its own article
  - Upper Second Creek, mouth at 37°16′27″N 83°11′25″W headwaters at 37°14′32″N 83°08′35″W
    - Combs Fork 2.5 miles (4.0 km) upstream, mouth at 37°16′10″N 83°09′07″W
  - Walker Branch
  - Davidson Branch 2 miles (3.2 km) upstream of Hazard post office, mouth at 37°14′16″N 83°10′43″W
  - Gregory Branch, mouth at 37°14′09″N 83°10′17″W
  - Big Creek at altitude 810 feet (250 m), mouth at 37°16′05″N 83°14′42″W, whose further tributaries and locations are in its own article

=== Typo, First Creek, and Lower and Upper Second Creeks ===
The Typo railway station is at the mouth of First Creek and is 5.5 miles (8.9 km) by rail from Hazard railway station.

In 1918, four mining companies mined First Creek, the Harvey Coal Company mining First itself and Road Branch, the Kentucky Block Coal Company mining Wolf Pen Branch, the Blue Diamond Coal Company mining White Oak Branch, and the First Creek Coal Company mining Road Branch.

Ira Stacey had a mine on a minor (and †) branch 2 miles (3.2 km) upstream on Bee Branch, and E. C. Combs one 0.5 miles (0.80 km) upstream. Benjamin and James Stacey had mines on Upper Second Creek.

Also on Upper Second Creek, 1.5 miles (2.4 km) upstream from its mouth, was the Monos post office, established on 1922-01-13 by postmaster Marion C. Combs. It closed in May 1924.

The Leonard mining town, and Leonard railway station, were just downstream of the mouth of Lower Second Creek, 8 miles (13 km) from Hazard by rail. The Butterfly post office was established on 1920-05-04 by postmaster Ollie Clay Day, who was the mining company's bookkeeper. The railway later changed the name of the station to Sonia, both names apparently taken from persons associated with the railway company. The Butterfly post office was simply named for the numerous butterflies observed in the area.

=== Gregory Branch and Lothair ===
The Raccoon Coal Company had a mine next to the mouth of Gregory Branch.

Lothair was a mining camp opposite the mouth of Davidson Branch. The land was owned by George, the brother of Elijah Combs, and the Ashless Coal Corporation who operated the camp was owned by brothers Hugh and L. N. Buford. A L&N railway station named Lothair was opened in 1914, and on 1915-01-27 the Lothair post office was established by postmaster Andrew J. Upton. Various hypotheses exist as to the origin of the name, including that it might have been an oblique reference to Lotharingia, but no origin has been determined for certain. The post office became a rural branch of Hazard post office in 1957 and closed in 1975.

Lothair was annexed by Hazard in the 1960s, in order that it could pay for a public sewer line.

=== Walker Branch and Allais ===
Allais was a mining camp established in the early 1920s at the mouth of Walker Branch by the Columbus Mining Company, owned by the J. B. Hilton family. The name came from the mine superintendent, one Victor Allais Sr. The Allais post office was established on 1922-10-19 by postmaster James S. Trosper. By that point, the mining camp had approximately 1000 residents, an L&N railway station, and a commissary run by Allais's wife and son. The post office closed in 1955.

Walkertown, as it later came to be known, was also annexed into Hazard.

=== Hazard ===
In 1918, the then town of Hazard was in between Walker Branch and Gregory Branch. Mines in the town included the Speak brothers's mine on a minor fork of North Fork itself, over the river bridge; a mine at the north of the town; and one at the U-shaped river bend between Hazard and Lothair.

The USGS gaging-station (number 3-2775) for the North Fork Kentucky River at Hazard is maintained at this bend, at 37°14′45″N 83°11′00″W on the right bank on the downstream side of Woodland Park Bridge, 150 feet (46 m) upstream from Hazard city waterworks and 4.0 miles (6.4 km) upstream from Lotts Creek.

Airport Gardens was a post office on land originally owned by "Danger Nick" Combs (see the Combs family below), just downstream of the mouth of Meadow Branch, and was named because it was across North Fork from what was Hazard Airport. The post office existed from 1953 to 1970, Hazard Airport itself having opened in 1945 and later replaced by the East Kentucky Regional Airport in 1983. Nearby was the Appalachian Regional Hospital, which was within the Hazard city limits whilst the neighbouring residential homes are not.

=== Lennut and Domino ===
A long way by river along North Fork but a short distance by rail from Hazard is the Lennut railway station, which was opened to serve a mining camp operated by the North Fork Coal Company. The Lennut post office was established on 1914-07-10 by postmaster Kelley E. Watts. Its name is literally the reverse spelling of the word "tunnel", as Tunnel was the name that was originally wanted (but was already taken and rejected by the USPS), since it was 500 yards (460 m) from the end of the railway tunnel through which the line passed to Hazard.

The Domino post office was established two weeks after Lennut was, for a mining camp operated by the Himyar Coal Company and a railway station serving it on the same line, by postmaster John B. Allen.

Both Lennut and Domino post offices closed in 1933.

== Floods ==
The Kentucky River basin, including North Fork and its tributaries, suffered a major flood in January and February 1957. Hazard was the worst hit place in the entire basin, with all highways blocked, all utilities out of operation, and the main streets under anywhere up to 17 feet (5.2 m) of floodwater. Five people died: three from death or exposure, and an elderly couple who had taken refuge in a house in Darfork at Lotts Creek that caught fire.

70 buildings were destroyed, and 300 homes and 180 commercial and industrial buildings were damaged. The bridge to Hazard Airport was swept away on 29 January, and there was damage around Lothair, Airport Gardens, and Combs. The total cost of the damage to Hazard was some US$84,500,000 (equivalent to $968,646,327 in 2025).

The peak stage at the gaging station was 37.54 feet (11.44 m), the previous record having been 34 feet (10 m) on 1927-05-20.

== Combs station and the Combs family ==
Emmanuel M. Combs and Abijah Benjamin Combs operated the Dolen mining camp, midway between Lennut and Domino. The L&N built a station there in 1916 for the camp that it named Combs, and the Combs post office was established on 1922-07-17 by postmaster Dewey Colwell. It remains there still.

Abijah subdivided his share of the land in 1923, and it was turned into lots for homes and businesses, which grew to almost 900 residents by 1932. The Dolen mining camp was renamed to Combs, by which it and the subdivisions are now known.

A local Combs family sprawls over North Fork and its tributaries. Various post offices and creeks are named after them, and often they are distinguished by nicknames. Historian Thomas D. Clark observed in 1942 that one could greet a stranger in many communities around North Fork with "Good morning, Mr. Combs!" and be almost certain to get the name right.

The Bearville postoffice on Troublesome Creek, where there are also several Combs family mines and a Combs Branch, was named after "Bear" Combs; the Fisty post office there was named after "Fisty Sam" Combs; and the Tunnel and later Dwarf post office was named twice after Combses, first after Sam and Felix Combs's mining tunnel, then after "Short Jerry" Combs. Other family members included "Tight Jerry", "Loose Jerry", "Free Jerry", "Slow Jerry", "Chunky Jerry", "Round Jerry", and "Beet Nose Jerry" Combs.

Nicholas "Danger Nick" Combs, erstwhile owner of the land where the aforementioned Airport Gardens later was, also gave his name to the (adjacent) Danger Fork of Trace Fork and to the "Lots" spelling of Lotts Creek and possibly also to Danfork coal town, railway station, and post office and Dark Fork, when it wasn't named after another Combs, Helen Combs. There was also a Nicholas "Birdseye" Combs.

"Danger Nick" was one of the early settlers of Perry County, who came with his brother John Combs and their families from Virginia in the 1790s. They later spread out to Carrs Fork, Lothair (the aforementioned George Combs), and Hazard (founded by the aforementioned Elijah Combs).

== See also ==
- List of rivers of Kentucky

== Sources ==
- Hodge, James Michael (1918). Coals of the North Fork of Kentucky River in Perry and Portions of Breathitt and Knott Counties. Reports of the Kentucky Geological Survey 4th series 1912–1918. Vol. 3. Frankfort, Kentucky: The State Journal Company. (Coals of the North Fork of Kentucky River in Perry and Portions of Breathitt and Knott Counties at the Internet Archive)
- Rennick, Robert M. (2000). Perry County — Post Offices. County Histories of Kentucky. Morehead State University.
- Rennick, Robert M. (2000). Knott County – Post Offices. County Histories of Kentucky. Morehead State University.
- Quigley, Martha Hall (2014). "Perry County". In Kleber, John E. (ed.). The Kentucky Encyclopedia. University Press of Kentucky. ISBN 978-0-8131-5901-0.
- Clark, Thomas Dionysius (2021). "Kentuckian, Mountaineer". The Kentucky (reprinted ed.). University Press of Kentucky. ISBN 9780813193854.
- Pitts, Anna C.; Whitesides, D. V.; Bell, Edwin Allen; Van Couvering, John A.; Kulp, W. K.; McGrain, Preston; Nichols, Edith S.; Hopkins, H. T.; Crawford, Thomas J. (1961). Water Levels in Observation Wells in Kentucky, Excluding Jefferson County: 1948 Through 1960. Kentucky Geological Survey, University of Kentucky.
- United States Army Corps of Engineers, Louisville District (1958-06-30). Review of Reports on Kentucky River and Tributaries. Louisville, Kentucky: Secretary of the Army.
- United States Geological Survey (1964). Floods of January–February 1957 in Southeastern Kentucky and Adjacent Areas. Geological Survey Water-supply Paper. United States Government Printing Office. 1652-A.
