= WZQQ =

WZQQ may refer to:

- WZQQ (FM), a radio station (97.9 FM) licensed to serve Hyden, Kentucky, United States
- WKIC (AM), a radio station (1390 AM) licensed to serve Hazard, Kentucky, which held the call sign WZQQ from 2009 to 2019
