= Troublesome Creek (North Fork Kentucky River tributary) =

River in Kentucky, United States

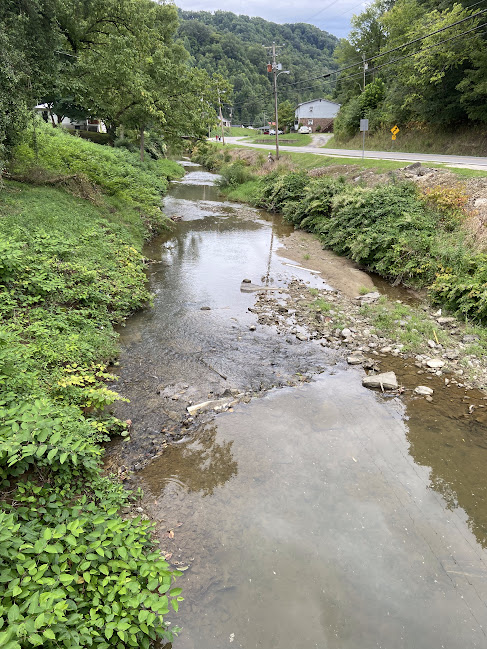
Troublesome Creek in Hindman, Kentucky

Troublesome Creek is a creek in Breathitt, Perry and Knott counties, Kentucky, a fork of the North Fork Kentucky River. It is 41.46 miles (66.72 km) long with a gradient of 8.92 feet per mile (168.9 cm/km), normally free-flowing, and with banks that vary between tree-lined and open.

Its headwaters are where its Left and Right Forks join at Hindman, the Knott County seat. The creek flows down to join the North Fork of the Kentucky River near Haddix in Breathitt County.

== Tributaries and other locations ==
- Its major tributaries are:
  - Lost Creek just over 1 mile (1.6 km) upstream at an altitude of 735 feet (224 m)
  - Hayes Branch 2.5 miles (4.0 km) upstream at an altitude of 735 feet (224 m)
  - Halfway Branch 3.375 miles (5.432 km) upstream at an altitude of 740 feet (230 m)
  - Riley Branch 6 miles (9.7 km) upstream at an altitude of 745 feet (227 m)
  - Barge Creek 6.5 miles (10.5 km) upstream at an altitude of 745 feet (227 m)
    - Right Fork 0.5 miles (0.80 km) upstream at an altitude of 755 feet (230 m)
  - Lewis Branch 7.625 miles (12.271 km) upstream at an altitude of 750 feet (230 m)
  - Russell Branch 8 miles (13 km) upstream at an altitude of 755 feet (230 m)
    - Andy Branch 0.875 miles (1.408 km) upstream at an altitude of 825 feet (251 m)
    - Right Fork 1.75 miles (2.82 km) upstream
  - Millers Branch (also Nix Branch and Harvey's Branch)8.75 miles (14.08 km) upstream at an altitude of 755 feet (230 m)
  - Caney Creek 9.625 miles (15.490 km) upstream at an altitude of 760 feet (230 m)
    - Right Fork 0.75 miles (1.21 km) upstream
  - Fugate Fork 11.375 miles (18.306 km) upstream at an altitude of 765 feet (233 m)
    - Laurel Fork 1.75 miles (2.82 km) upstream at an altitude of 905 feet (276 m)
    - Left Fork 1.75 miles (2.82 km) upstream at an altitude of 905 feet (276 m)
  - Lower Beaverdam Branch 12.5 miles (20.1 km) upstream at an altitude of 765 feet (233 m)
  - Buckhorn Creek 13.75 miles (22.13 km) upstream at an altitude of 770 feet (230 m)
  - Upper Beaver Dam 15 miles (24 km) upstream at an altitude of 780 feet (240 m)
  - Cat Hollow 15.75 miles (25.35 km) upstream at an altitude of 790 feet (240 m)
  - Francis Branch 17 miles (27 km) upstream at an altitude of 795 feet (242 m)
  - Noble Branch 17.5 miles (28.2 km) upstream at an altitude of 800 feet (240 m)
  - Steve Branch 17.75 miles (28.57 km) upstream at an altitude of 805 feet (245 m)
  - Rowdy Branch 17.75 miles (28.57 km) upstream at an altitude of 805 feet (245 m)
  - McNelly Branch 19.75 miles (31.78 km) upstream at an altitude of 815 feet (248 m)
  - Tom's Branch 20.5 miles (33.0 km) upstream at an altitude of 820 feet (250 m)
    - Right Fork 0.875 miles (1.408 km) upstream at an altitude of 900 feet (270 m)
    - Left Fork 0.875 miles (1.408 km) upstream at an altitude of 900 feet (270 m)
  - McJilton Branch 21.5 miles (34.6 km) upstream at an altitude of 825 feet (251 m)
    - Left Fork 1.25 miles (2.01 km) upstream at an altitude of 1,030 feet (310 m)
  - Laurel Branch 22 miles (35 km) upstream at an altitude of 825 feet (251 m)
  - Williams Branch 23 miles (37 km) upstream at an altitude of 830 feet (250 m)
    - Buck Fork 1.25 miles (2.01 km) upstream at an altitude of 960 feet (290 m)
  - Beech Branch 23 miles (37 km) upstream at an altitude of 830 feet (250 m)
    - Right Fork 0.375 miles (0.604 km) upstream at an altitude of 990 feet (300 m)
  - Balls Fork 23.875 miles (38.423 km) upstream at an altitude of 835 feet (255 m)
  - Little Ball Fork 24 miles (39 km) upstream at an altitude of 840 feet (260 m)
  - Pigeon Roost Branch 24.875 miles (40.032 km) upstream at an altitude of 845 feet (258 m)
    - Coalstone Branch 0.625 miles (1.006 km) upstream at an altitude of 905 feet (276 m)
    - Right Fork 1.25 miles (2.01 km) upstream at an altitude of 960 feet (290 m)
    - Left Fork 1.25 miles (2.01 km) upstream at an altitude of 960 feet (290 m)
  - Coles Branch 25.5 miles (41.0 km) upstream at an altitude of 850 feet (260 m)
  - Laurel Lick Branch 26.25 miles (42.25 km) upstream at an altitude of 860 feet (260 m)
  - Bear Branch 28 miles (45 km) upstream at an altitude of 875 feet (267 m)
  - Combs Branch 29 miles (47 km) upstream at an altitude of 885 feet (270 m)
    - Right Fork 0.25 miles (0.40 km) upstream at an altitude of 905 feet (276 m)
    - Left Fork 0.25 miles (0.40 km) upstream at an altitude of 905 feet (276 m)
      - Hog Wallow Branch 1.5 miles (2.4 km) upstream at an altitude of 1,110 feet (340 m)
  - Trace Branch 30.25 miles (48.68 km) upstream at an altitude of 900 feet (270 m)
  - Clear Creek 31.125 miles (50.091 km) upstream at an altitude of 910 feet (280 m)
    - Shop Hollow 0 miles (0 km) upstream at an altitude of 910 feet (280 m)
      - Right Fork 0.5 miles (0.80 km) upstream at an altitude of 1,025 feet (312 m)
    - Long Branch 0.625 miles (1.006 km) upstream at an altitude of 935 feet (285 m)
      - Right Fork 1 mile (1.6 km) upstream at an altitude of 1,185 feet (361 m)
    - Cockrell Trace 1 mile (1.6 km) upstream at an altitude of 945 feet (288 m)
      - Right Fork 0.25 miles (0.40 km) upstream at an altitude of 1,000 feet (300 m)
      - Gearheart Fork 1 mile (1.6 km) upstream at an altitude of 1,115 feet (340 m)
    - Dick's Branch 2.875 miles (4.627 km) upstream at an altitude of 1,015 feet (309 m)
      - Buzzards Branch 1 mile (1.6 km) upstream at an altitude of 1,120 feet (340 m)
  - Montgomery Creek 34.75 miles (55.92 km) upstream at an altitude of 945 feet (288 m)
  - Short Branch 35.25 miles (56.73 km) upstream at an altitude of 950 feet (290 m)
  - Walker Branch 37.25 miles (59.95 km) upstream at an altitude of 970 feet (300 m)
  - Mill Creek 37.78 miles (60.80 km) upstream at an altitude of 975 feet (297 m)
    - Buck Lick Branch 1.75 miles (2.82 km) upstream at an altitude of 1,120 feet (340 m)
  - Big Branch 39.5 miles (63.6 km) upstream at an altitude of 990 feet (300 m)
    - Sweet Gum Branch 1 mile (1.6 km) upstream at an altitude of 1,020 feet (310 m)
    - Right Fork 3 miles (4.8 km) upstream at an altitude of 1,195 feet (364 m)
  - Ogden Branch 40.5 miles (65.2 km) upstream at an altitude of 995 feet (303 m)
    - Baker Branch 0.25 miles (0.40 km) upstream at an altitude of 1,015 feet (309 m)
    - Pushback Branch 41.25 miles (66.39 km) upstream at an altitude of 1,005 feet (306 m)
  - Cy Everidge Branch 42.25 miles (67.99 km) upstream at an altitude of 1,010 feet (310 m)
  - Hindman 42.75 miles (68.80 km) upstream at an altitude (measured at the town courthouse steps) of 1,032 feet (315 m) and whose further tributaries and locations are in The Forks of Troublesome

=== within Perry County ===
Of its total length, 18 miles (29 km) are in Perry County, where it has had ten post offices over the years.

==== General ====
The Troublesome post office was established on 1882-05-01 by Joe C. Eversole. Eversole's first choice of name was Boggs but this was not acceptable to the USPS, so Eversole named it after the Creek, one of several things named after the Creek. It was originally located at the mouth of Balls Fork, and Eversole was not its postmaster, that being local storekeeper J. C. Boggs, from whom came the original choice of name. Troublesome post office moved one mile down Troublesome Creek in 1910, to the mouth of Williams Branch, and closed in January 1914.

The Tub post office was established on 1923-07-23 by postmaster George W. Allen. His original choice of name had been Troy after his (then) 26-year-old son, and it is unknown where Allen got Tub from. It was located at the head of the Pigeon Roost Branch in several places over the years, and closed in 1933.

In 1918 Mowbray and Robinson had a mine in Upper Beaver Dam Branch, Floyd Campbell had one in Cat Hollow, and Green Campbell one on a minor fork of Troblesome 16.75 miles (26.96 km) upstream. Hays and Campbell had a mine 0.5 miles (0.80 km) up Francis Branch. Walter Campbell had a mine on a minor fork of Williams Branch, 0.25 miles (0.40 km) upstream.

Lee Allen had a mine 18 miles (29 km) upstream on Troublesome, and S. M. Holliday had one at head of a minor fork 19.5 miles (31.4 km) upstream. J. Smith had a mine on a minor fork of Left Fork of Tom's Branch, and Richard Smith had one at the head of Left Fork of McJilton Branch. William Smith had one on a minor branch of the Left Fork of Pigeon Roost. and Lark Smith had one 0.125 miles (0.201 km) upstream on Pigeon Roost itself.

Jack Dobson's mine was 22.5 miles (36.2 km) upstream on Troublesome, and a Mr Ashley had a mine one a minor fork of Buck Fork, 0.125 miles (0.201 km) upstream.

Preston Williams's mine was on Williams Branch, 1.75 miles (2.82 km) upstream.

Both of Samuel Bush's mines were on minor forks of Left Fork Pigeon Roost, and William Brewer's was 2 miles (3.2 km) upstream on Left Fork.

==== Dwarf ====
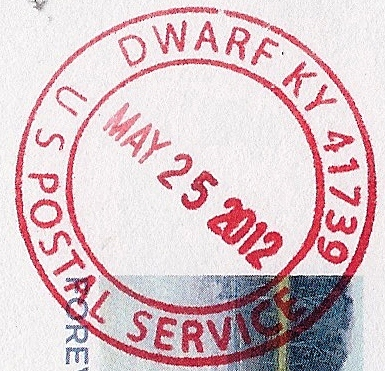
a 21st-century postmark of Dwarf post office

The earliest of the post offices, Tunell Hill was established on 1878-07-24 by postmaster Joseph Hall. It was named after the tunnel that Combs brothers Sam and Felix had cut for an aqueduct to their mill, and was at the mouth of Combs Branch. It closed in 1881, and was re-stablished as Dwarf on 1883-07-13 by postmaster Thomas W. Gibson. This name was another Combs association, this time with another Combs brother, Jeremiah, who was called "Short Jerry" because of his height. The Dwarf post office still exists today, and is located a short distance up Combs Branch from Troublesome Creek.

George Combs had a mine 0.75 miles (1.21 km) up Coles Branch. Wade Combs's mine was on a minor fork of Left Fork of Combs Branch. C. C. Combs's mine was 29.25 miles (47.07 km) upstream on Troublesome itself, and Jerry Combs's mine was in a minor branch of Troublesome 29.75 miles (47.88 km) upstream.

The headwaters of Combs Branch are across a small ridge from Trace Fork.

==== Engle family mines and the Left Fork of Combs Branch ====
Albert Engle's two mines were on a minor fork of Laurel Lick, 0.375 miles (0.604 km) upstream. and 26.625 miles (42.849 km) upstream on Troublesome itself. William Engle's was on a minor fork of Left Fork of Combs Branch. Martha Cornett's was on a minor fork, 0.125 miles (0.201 km) upstream, of the same Left Fork, J. B. Stamper's two mines were one on another minor fork of Left Fork 0.625 miles (1.006 km) upstream and another 1.875 miles (3.018 km) upstream on Left Fork. George Fugate had a mine 0.125 miles (0.201 km) upstream also on Left Fork itself.

==== Ary ====
The Ary post office was established on 1906-02-13 by postmaster Killus Combs. Its original location is uncertain but was likely at the mouth of Pigeon Roost Branch. Its original name was to be Dory after one of Killus's contemporaries in the Combs family, but this was rejected, and the origin of the name Ary is not known. It moved several times between 1910 and World War 2, for short distances, finally moving 1 mile (1.6 km) down from Pigeon Roost to Balls Fork in 1946, where it still exists today.

==== Rowdy and Stacy ====
The Stacy post office was established on 1890-06-30 by postmaster Ira Allen. Allen had wanted the name Noble because the post office was located at the mouth of Noble Branch, but that name had been already taken by another post office on Troublesome Creek. (See Lost Creek for the adjacent Noble farm on its Cockerell's Branch.)

Ira Allen was also the postmaster of another post office simultaneously. This was the Rowdy post office which he established on 1890-07-18. It was located at the mouth of the Rowdy Branch and closed the same year on 1890-10-02. The name of the branch and post office were, according to local lore, because of the "rowdy" nature of the inhabitants of the Branch.

In 1918 Anderson Hays had prospected Noble Branch, Mary Allen had a mine 0.5 miles (0.80 km) up its left fork, and the Campbell heirs had a mine just up another minor branch 0.625 miles (1.006 km) upstream. Andrew and Samuel Noble had a mine on Noble itself, 0.25 miles (0.40 km) upstream.

Stacy, in the meanwhile, lasted until its closure in 1933. It was, however, re-established in 1944 by postmaster Pearlie Neace. The environs had remained named Stacy, locally, after the post office closure, but the re-opened one used the name Rowdy. It was still open in 2000.

==== Stacy family mines ====
George Stacy had a mine 0.125 miles (0.201 km) up the Right Fork of Beech Branch, and Jasper Stacy had one 23.375 miles (37.618 km) upstream on Troublesome itself. and another on a minor fork of Little Ball Fork. Joseph Stacy had a mine 0.5 miles (0.80 km) upstream on the Coalstone Branch; and James Stacy had three, one on the Right Fork of Pigeon Roost Branch, and two (one on each side) 1.25 miles (2.01 km) upstream on the Right Fork of Combs Branch. Elkannah Stacy's mine was on a minor branch of Pigeon Roost.

=== within Breathitt County ===
==== General ====
The Hardshell post office was established on 1917-08-11 by postmaster Garvey Noble. The name came from a local church, of Hardshell Baptists, and the post office was located in several places between Clayhole post office (see below) and Noble Branch over its lifespan. It became a rural branch of Lost Creek post office in 1959, located at the mouth of Caney Creek, and finally closed in 1994.

At the top of Russell Branch is Flint Ridge, 780 feet (240 m) higher than Troublesome Creek. A. C. Russell was a local landowner at Russell Branch, and on its Right Fork Elisha Miller had a coal mine. John E. Miller had a mine at Miller's Branch, and A. Raleigh had a mine 0.125 miles (0.201 km) upstream just up what was then known as Bear Branch, 2.75 miles (4.43 km) upstream from the mouth of Miller's Branch.

Robert Fugate had a mine on Troublesome itself, 8.875 miles (14.283 km) upstream, with J. B. Noble's mine at 9.5 miles (15.3 km) upstream, and William Ellis' mine a little further along at 10.75 miles (17.30 km) upstream.

The Fugate Fork was location of Isaac Miller's mine (on a minor fork) 0.25 miles (0.40 km) upstream, Henry Hudson's mine (also on a minor fork) 0.375 miles (0.604 km) upstream, and Jackson Miller's mine. On Laurel Fork off Fugate, Thomas Ellis had a mine 0.25 miles (0.40 km) upstream, and Isaac Miller another mine 0.75 miles (1.21 km) upstream. Miller had a third mine 1.75 miles (2.82 km) upstream along Fugate's Left Fork, and a fourth 0.125 miles (0.201 km) along a minor branch off Left Fork at 0.75 miles (1.21 km) upstream of Left.

The heirs of John Jones had a mine 11.75 miles (18.91 km) upstream on Troublesome itself, where now remains the Jones cemetery. And Andrew Noble had a mine on a minor branch of Troublesome, 12.75 miles (20.52 km) upstream, where now remains the Noble cemetery.

The USGS gaging-station (number 3-2785) for the North Fork Kentucky River at Noble is maintained at 37°26′35″N 83°13′06″W on the left 14 miles (23 km) upstream from the mouth of Troublesome and 0.2 miles (0.32 km) downstream from Buckhorn Creek.

==== Clayhole ====
The Clayhole post office was established on 1899-04-05 by postmaster Dulana L. Allen. It was originally located 1 mile (1.6 km) upstream from the mouth of Riley Branch, and was reportedly named for the "sticky blue clay" in the stream bed. It moved from Riley onto the main Creek in 1918, and after moving several more times to the mouth of Russell Branch, to the mouth of Barge Creek, and to the area downstream of Riley, it ended up in its present location at the mouth of Riley Branch.

==== Haddix ====
The town of Haddix was founded with the arrival of the railroad at the mouth of Troublesome Creek. It had a railway station and a post office, established on 1916-07-08 by postmaster Floyd Russell, both named Haddix. It is generally agreed by local historians that the railroad company named the town, station, and post office for the Haddix family, a family of settlers and local landowners that included amongst its number blacksmith Samuel Haddix and 1830s salt well and later 1850s coal miner William Haddix. However, family member Tom Haddix claimed that they were all named after him in particular, as he had been the person who had done the surveys through Perry and Breathitt counties on behalf of the L&E railways, and owned the land that the railways used for right of way.

The Haddix post office was closed in November 1990, postal services being transferred to the Lost Creek post office.

=== within Knott County ===
==== General ====
The Mink post office was established on 1898-10-31 by Silas E. Boggs. He had wanted the name Boggs, but that was rejected. The post office was likely just downstream of Lick Branch, Boggs's country store being 3 miles (4.8 km) upstream of Emmalena (see below). It closed after just a year in August 1899.

In 1918 the Engle heirs had a mine on a minor fork of Trace Branch, 0.5 miles (0.80 km) upstream. Alexander Francis's was in a minor fork of Long Branch of Clear Creek, 1 mile (1.6 km) upstream. Bayliss Gearheart's mine was on a minor fork of Shop Hollow, 0.375 miles (0.604 km) upstream. E. H. Gearheart's was on a minor fork of Montgomery Branch, 2 miles (3.2 km) upstream.

R. L. Morgan had a mine on Troublesome itself, 34.125 miles (54.919 km) upstream. D. L. Fuller's mine was at the head of Short Branch, 0.875 miles (1.408 km) upstream. N. W. Simpson had a mine at the mouth of Right Fork of Big Branch. Bud Newland's mine was on Pushback Branch, 0.25 miles (0.40 km) upstream, and Asa Dickenson's was on a minor fork of Pushback, 0.75 miles (1.21 km) upstream. Joseph Tignor had a mine on Troublesome, 41.875 miles (67.391 km) upstream.

J. S. Boggs's mine was on Troublesome, 35.75 miles (57.53 km) upstream, and S. E. Boggs's mine was on a minor branch of Troublesome, 36.25 miles (58.34 km) upstream.

The gap at the head of Dicks Fork (altitude 1,398 feet (426 m)) connects to the Big Fork of Lotts Creek. The gap at the head of Clear Creek (altitude 1,751 feet (534 m)) connects to the Youngs Fork of Lotts Creek. The gap at the head of Ogden Branch (altitude 1,430 feet (440 m)) connects to the Trace Branch of Balls Fork. The gap at the head of Trace Branch (altitude 1,218 feet (371 m)) connects to the Roaring Branch of Balls Fork.

==== Hindman ====
The city of Hindman is the county seat of Knott County, and is located where Troublesome Creek separates into its Left and Right forks. Its original name, before its establishment as the seat of the county, was The Forks of Troublesome.

==== Emmalena ====
The Emmalena post office was established on 1894-10-05 by postmaster Orlena Combs (a.k.a. Mrs Robert) Morgan. It was, and still is, located on Troublesome Creek 8.5 miles (13.7 km) west of Hindman, and was established to serve an already existing small hamlet of roughly 300 people that had a store, church camp, and consolidated school. The name is a portmanteau of postmaster, and local storekeeper, Morgan's first name Orlena with the first name of Emma Thurman, who was the wife of an interant schoolteacher who had also applied for the postmastership. Orlena Combs Morgan was the great-granddaughter of early settler of the area Jeremiah "Long Jerry" Combs, and the post office has been run by Morgan family members since then.

==== Fisty ====
The Fisty post office was established on 1906-08-18 by postmasters Margarate and Joseph R. Ritchie. It was named after a branch of the sprawling local Combs family, headed by "Fisty Sam" Combs. It was, and still is, located at the mouth of Clear Creek.

==== Carrie ====
The Carrie post office was established on 1912-02-06 by postmaster Henry Combs. It was named after his wife Carrie, who was also a Combs family member. It was, and still is, located midway between Hindman and Emmalena.

==== Richie/Ritchie family mines and post offices ====
The Ritchie post office was established on 1900-01-12 by postmaster Abbie Ritchie. It was originally located 3 miles (4.8 km) upstream of Clear Creek, and moved over its history to several places down the creek until finally ending at a point 5.25 miles (8.45 km) southwest of Emmalena and 2.5 miles (4.0 km) from Troublesome post offices. It was named for the local Ritchie family, and was operate by family members until it closed in 1974.

Benjamin Richie had a mine in a minor fork of Cockerel Trace, 0.625 miles (1.006 km) upstream. Joseph Richie's mine was on a minor fork of Dicks Branch, 1.375 miles (2.213 km) upstream. Edward Richie's two mines were one at the head of a minor fork of Clear Creek, 3.25 miles (5.23 km) upstream, which had a trail connecting to the Short Branch of Troublesome, and another on Pushback Branch, 0.375 miles (0.604 km) upstream. David Richie's mine was on Clear Creek, 5.5 miles (8.9 km) upstream. Samuel Smith's two mines on Dicks Branch were one 1.875 miles (3.018 km) upstream, beside a school house, and the other 2 miles (3.2 km) upstream.

==== Combs family mines ====
Jordan Combs had a mine on another minor fork of Trace, 0.75 miles (1.21 km) upstream. B. J. Combs's mine was on a minor fork of the Right Fork of Show Hollow, 0.125 miles (0.201 km) upstream. William Combs's two mines were one on a minor fork of Clear Creek, 4.25 miles (6.84 km) upstream, and the other on Clear itself, 4.375 miles (7.041 km) upstream; Cleveland Combs's was on another minor fork of Clear, 4.5 miles (7.2 km) upstream; and Jerry Comb's was on a third minor fork, 5.125 miles (8.248 km) upstream.

Samuel Combs's two mines were one on a minor fork of Troublesome itself, 31.25 miles (50.29 km) upstream, and the second at the head of another minor fork, 32 miles (51 km) upstream. J.R. Combs had a mine on a minor branch of Troublesome, 33.75 miles (54.32 km) upstream.

==== Everidge/Everage family mines and post offices ====
The Tina post office was established on 1905-11-10 by postmaster Wiley A. Combs. It was named for Clementina, the wife of John Wesley Combs, a state senator in the 1870s who lived on Irishman Creek. It was originally located 2.5 miles (4.0 km) upstream on Montgomery Creek, but moved back and forth along Montgomery at least ten times. The first move was 1 mile (1.6 km) downstream in 1910.

The next was when it was re-established, on 1920-09-04 by postmaster Elvira Everage, after it had closed in January 1914. Several members of the Everage family were postmasters who relocated it to several different spots. It ended up 3.5 miles (5.6 km) upstream on Montgomery, and closed in October 1978, because of Kentucky Route 80.

Sarah Everidge had a mine on a minor branch of Cy Everidge Branch, 0.25 miles (0.40 km) upstream.

==== Cornett family mines ====
Andrew Cornett had a mine on a minor branch of Mill Creek, 1.375 miles (2.213 km) upstream; Jefferson Cornett's mine was on Sweet Gum Branch, 1.5 miles (2.4 km) upstream; Green Cornett's was also on Sweet Gum, 2.25 miles (3.62 km) upstream; and Susan Cornett's was on Troublesome itself, 39.75 miles (63.97 km) upstream.

== Hydrology ==
The whole Kentucky River Basin is subject to regular flooding, caused by high rainfall, and because the banks of its various tributaries are generally steep, flood damage is usually to buildings, towns, and roads that are on the courses of the creeks. The generally rocky terrain of the area causes rainwater to run off into many ephemeral creeks, that feed into the perennial ones, rather than being absorbed into the soil. Much of the built environment in the area is along the creek beds, meaning that damage is mainly to it rather than to agricultural areas.

Although the former mines along Troublesome may have contributed to the risk of flooding, by compacting the soil and making it further less able to absorb rainwater, they however also have flattened out parts of the terrain providing areas where there is less runoff channelled into ephemeral creeks.

Troublesome Creek along with other Kentucky River tributaries suffered a major flood in January and February 1957, although that did not exceed the highest on record for Troublesome itself at that point, which had been the flood of February 1939.

A further major flood occurred, again because of high rainfall over the preceding three days, on July 28, 2022, killing 39 people. There was property damage in many locations along the Creek including at Fisty, Carrie, and Lost Creek post offices. Three of the deaths were in Hindman city, which was entirely underwater.

A reservoir on Troublesome for containing floodwaters was considered in 1958, but the idea was rejected because it wouldn't be large enough. Ongoing reforestation projects at former mine sites along the creek have the aim of ameliorating the effects of rainfall, as their tree canopy and root systems absorb water. The mines themselves also had retention basins, diversion ditches, and sediment ponds to catch rainfall run-off, although these are, like the considered reservoir, not large enough to ameliorate major floods.

Dredging the Creek is prohibited by rules for preserving endangered species like the local arrow fish, and may not be as effective as the creeks' own natural systems of self-regulation, and in any case the bedrock is not far below the creek bed and there is not much scope for dredging. More significant effects may result from changing the land use practices, the construction of roads, deforestation, and farming, which increase sediment levels and raise the creek beds, leading to increased outflow during floods to the surrounding flood plains.

The drainage of the basin covered by the aforementioned USGS gaging-station for the North Fork Kentucky River at Noble is 177 square miles (460 km^{2}). The station is at 768.5 feet (234.2 m) above mean sea level (datum as of 1929) and its highest historic recording was approximately 29 feet (8.8 m) in the February 1939 flood, with a record of 37.54 feet (11.44 m) and a discharge rate of 47,800 cubic feet per second (1.35 Ml/s) on 1957-01-29.

== Things named after the creek ==
The Creek's own name was, anecdotally, given to it by early settler Colby Haddix; it appears in the 1820 Act of the state legislature that created Perry County. It is likely simply named for how "troublesome" it is to navigate, with its many bends. Several things, in addition to Hindman's original name and the aforementioned former Troublesome post office, are named after it:

James Still's book On Troublesome Creek is a collection of short stories.

The "Blue Fugates", nickamed the "Blue People of Troublesome Creek" by Cathy Trost in 1982, a family so-called because some of them had blue skin from inheriting methemoglobinemia, lived in the area in the 19th and 20th centuries.

The Troublesome Creek Times is a weekly newspaper for Knott County that is published in Hindman, and the first charter member of the Associated Press's Newsfinder service for Kentucky.

== See also ==
- List of rivers of Kentucky
- The Book Woman of Troublesome Creek

== Sources ==
- Hodge, James Michael (1918). Coals of the North Fork of Kentucky River in Perry and Portions of Breathitt and Knott Counties. Reports of the Kentucky Geological Survey 4th series 1912–1918. Vol. 3. Frankfort, Kentucky: The State Journal Company. (Coals of the North Fork of Kentucky River in Perry and Portions of Breathitt and Knott Counties at the Internet Archive)
- Rennick, Robert M. (2000). Perry County – Post Offices. County Histories of Kentucky. Vol. 273. Morehead State University.
- Rennick, Robert M. (2000). Breathitt County – Post Offices. County Histories of Kentucky. Vol. 159. Morehead State University.
- Rennick, Robert M. (2000). Knott County – Post Offices. County Histories of Kentucky. Vol. 237. Morehead State University.
- Maccracken, Jim (2017). "Troublesome Creek". Breathitt County Kentucky Fishing & Floating Guide Book. Kentucky Fishing & Floating Guide Books. Recreational Guides.
- United States Army Corps of Engineers, Louisville District (1958-06-30). Review of Reports on Kentucky River and Tributaries. Louisville, Kentucky: Secretary of the Army.
- Horn, Austin (2022-08-29). "The trouble with Troublesome Creek: How one KY stream became the center of a flood disaster". Lexington Herald-Leader.
- Olson, Ted, ed. (2009). "Introduction". James Still in Interviews, Oral Histories and Memoirs. Contributions to Southern Appalachian Studies. Vol. 23. McFarland. ISBN 978-0-7864-3698-9.
- Trost, Cathy (November 1982). "The Blue People of Troublesome Creek". Science. Vol. 82. pp. 35–39.
- Donaldson James, Susan (February 22, 2012). "Fugates of Kentucky: Skin Bluer than Lake Louise". ABC News.
- Daley, Ron (2014). "Troublesome Creek Times". In Kleber, John E. (ed.). The Kentucky Encyclopedia. University Press of Kentucky. ISBN 978-0-8131-5901-0.
- Pitts, Anna C.; Whitesides, D. V.; Bell, Edwin Allen; Van Couvering, John A.; Kulp, W. K.; McGrain, Preston; Nichols, Edith S.; Hopkins, H. T.; Crawford, Thomas J. (1961). Water Levels in Observation Wells in Kentucky, Excluding Jefferson County: 1948 Through 1960. Kentucky Geological Survey, University of Kentucky.
