= Talcum (disambiguation) =

Talcum may refer to:

- Talc, a mineral composed of hydrated magnesium silicate
- Talcum, Kentucky, a community in Knott County, Kentucky
- Talcum Powder (film), a 1982 Italian comedy film
