= WSGS =

- Hazard, Kentucky; United States
- Broadcast area: Eastern Kentucky; Southwest Virginia; Northeastern Tennessee
- Frequency: 101.1 MHz
- Branding: "101 WSGS"

Programming
- Format: Country
- Affiliations: ABC News Radio

Ownership
- Owner: Mountain Broadcasting Service, Inc.
- Sister stations: WJMD, WKIC, WZQQ

History
- First air date: November 23, 1947
- Call sign meaning: Last names of the original owners: Whitaker, Sparkman, Gorman, Sturgill

Technical information
- Licensing authority: FCC
- Facility ID: 43964
- Class: C
- ERP: 100,000 watts horizontal 88,000 watts vertical
- HAAT: 446 meters (1,463 ft)
- Transmitter coordinates: 37°11′38.0″N 83°10′52.0″W

Links
- Public license information: Public file; LMS
- Webcast: Listen Live
- Website: wsgs.com

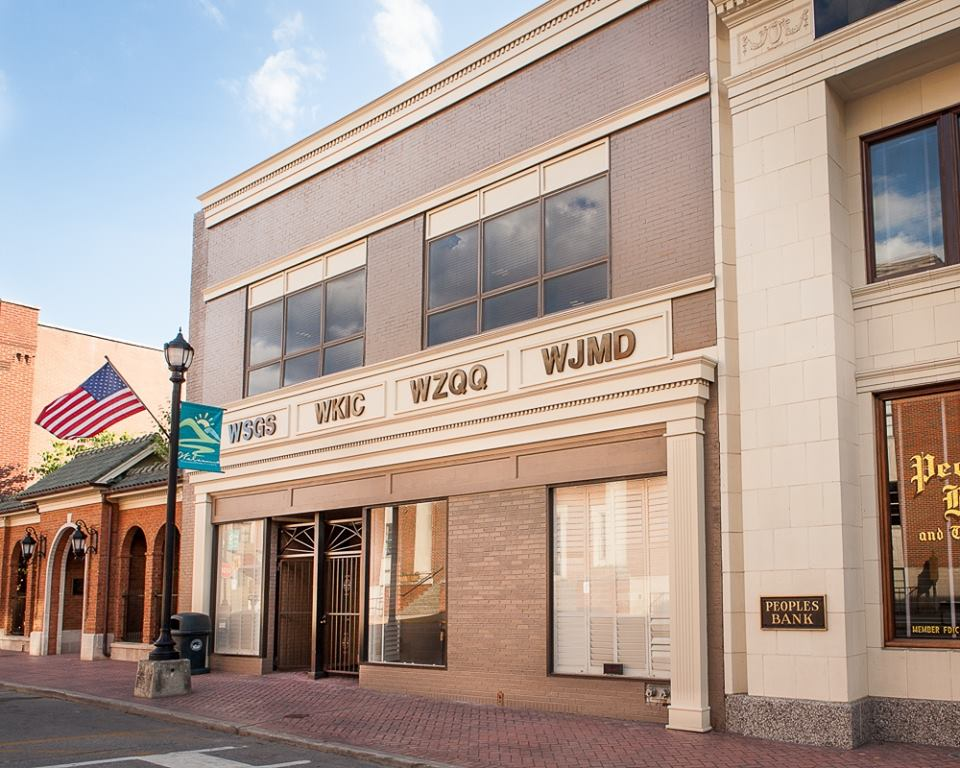
Studios of WSGS and sister-stations in Downtown Hazard

WSGS (101.1 FM) is a country formatted broadcast radio station licensed to Hazard, Kentucky, United States, serving Eastern Kentucky and Southwest Virginia. WSGS is owned and operated by Mountain Broadcasting Service, Inc.

Due to the high altitude of the station's transmitter, WSGS's strong signal can be heard throughout eastern Kentucky, southwest Virginia, and northeastern Tennessee, including parts of the Tri-Cities.
