= Tribbey =

Tribbey may refer to:

- Tribbey, Kentucky, a community in Perry County, Kentucky
- Tribbey, Oklahoma, a community in Pottawatomie County, Oklahoma
