= John Robert Procter =

American geologist and civil service reformer

John R. Procter
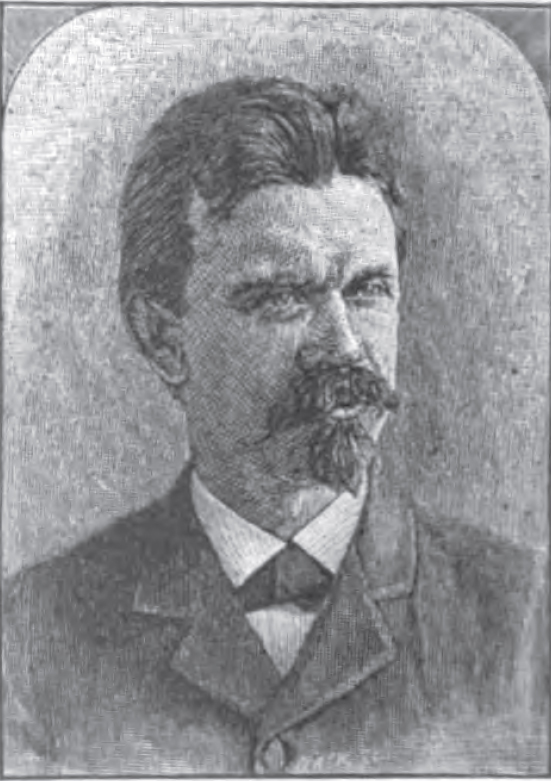
- Born: March 16, 1844; Mason County, Kentucky
- Died: December 12, 1903 (aged 59); Washington, D.C.
- Occupations: Geologist, civil service reformer
- Known for: President of the United States Civil Service Commission from 1893 to 1903

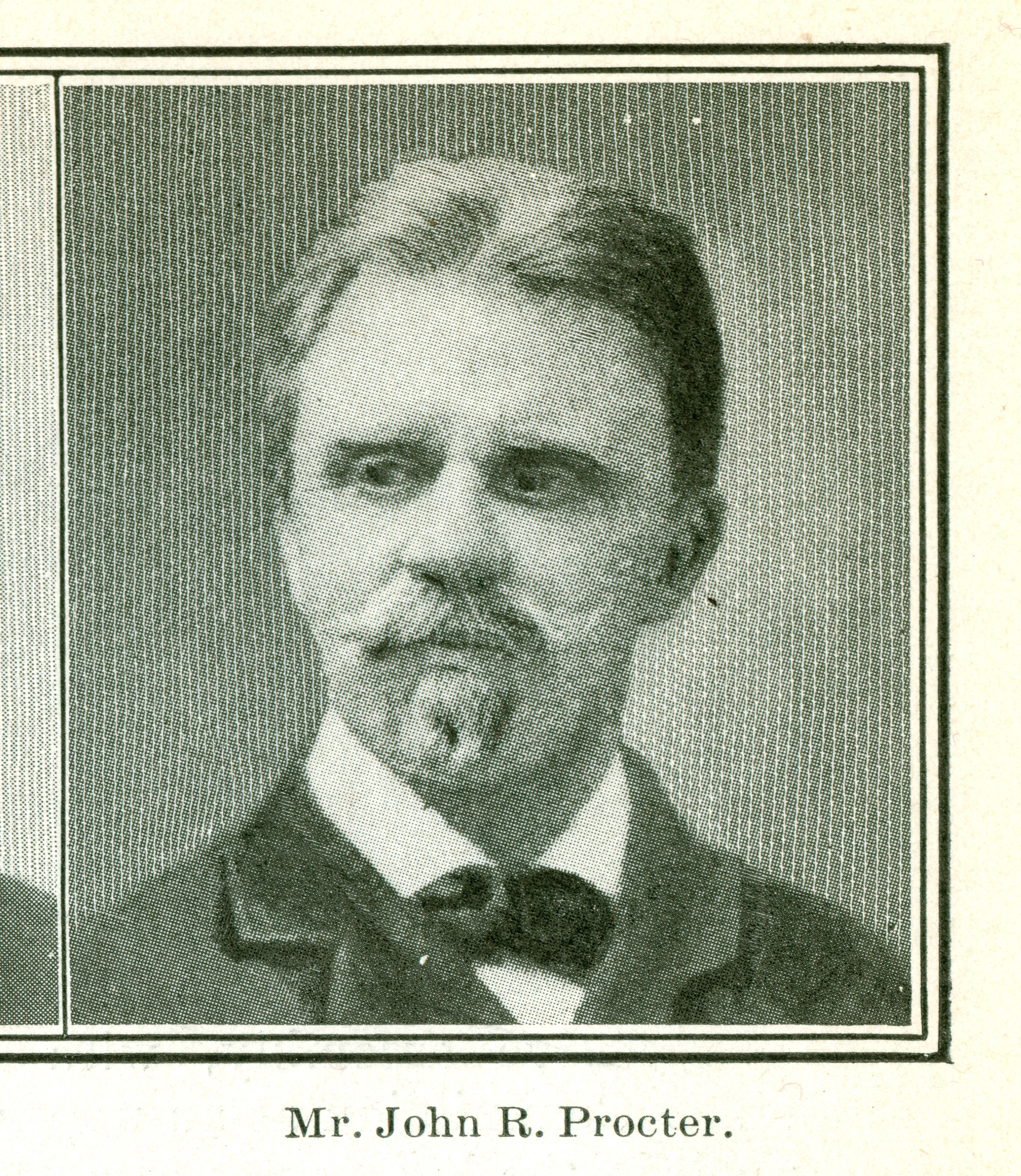

John Robert Procter (March 16, 1844 – December 12, 1903) was an American geologist and civil service reformer. He was the Kentucky state geologist from 1880 to 1893, and president of the United States Civil Service Commission from 1893 to 1903.

== Biography ==
John Robert Procter was born in Mason County, Kentucky on March 16, 1844. His mother died when he was very young, and he was brought up by an aunt. When he showed an inclination to enlist in the Confederate Army, his aunt sent him to the University of Pennsylvania to prevent this. He spent freshman year in a science program there, and then left and enlisted as a Confederate in 1863. He served until the end of the war. At the close of the war, he returned to his home farm in Kentucky, where he remained until 1873.

In 1873 he met Kentucky state geologist Nathaniel Shaler, also a Harvard professor. Procter became assistant in the Kentucky Geological Survey, and also studied geology during 1875 at Harvard. In 1880 he succeeded Shaler as state geologist.

As state geologist, he was brought into contact with the spoils system, to which his opposition was so uncompromising — he refused, even at the request of members of the state legislature, to remove competent assistants for political reasons — that he finally lost his position in 1893 when the Governor of Kentucky finally refused the support Procter which had received from that office in the past. Allegedly the Governor wanted to make some appointments for political and personal reasons. Procter had resisted these appointments advising that the geological survey office be closed rather than make it a machine to be used to advance political interests by letting out the offices for partisan ends.

His struggle with the spoils system brought him to national attention, and in the same year, at the recommendation of Theodore Roosevelt, Procter was appointed by President Grover Cleveland as president of the Civil Service Commission, a post which he held till his death. Procter's criticism of the spoils system was based not only on its evil moral and social effects, but also on its absurdity as a method of conducting business. He presented this view constantly and effectively. His work as president of the commission was the means of increasing the effectiveness of the civil service, and of gaining for it recognition in political life.

During Procter's service on the commission, the number of positions subject to the merit system increased from 43,000 to 120,000. In 1896, Procter secured the release of the positions of chief clerks and chiefs of divisions from the spoils system and had them filled by promotions or transfers from within the classified service.

Procter served as a member of the Jury of Awards at the Chicago World's Fair, and was a frequent contributor to magazines and journals on geologic, economic, international and political subjects. He was a member of the Century Club of New York City.

He died of angina pectoris on December 12, 1903, while at the Cosmos Club in Washington, D.C., where he was attending the annual meeting of the National Civil Service Reform League.
