= Trace Fork =

River in Kentucky, United States

Physical characteristics
- Source: Trace Fork headwaters
  - coordinates: 37°19′06″N 83°09′12″W
- 2nd source: Pigeon Roost Road Fork headwaters
  - coordinates: 37°19′34″N 83°10′12″W
- 3rd source: Lost Creek Road Fork headwaters
  - location: foothills of Lost Mountain
  - coordinates: 37°19′06″N 83°10′28″W
- 4th source: Jake Fork headwaters
  - coordinates: 37°18′14″N 83°06′53″W
- 5th source: Sang Fork headwaters
  - coordinates: 37°18′40″N 83°08′29″W
- Mouth: Lotts Creek
  - coordinates: 37°17′18″N 83°10′45″W
  - elevation: 825 feet (251 m)

Trace Fork or Trace Branch is a creek in Perry County, Kentucky in the United States. It a fork of Lotts Creek 1 mile (1.6 km) upstream from the latter's mouth at an altitude of 825 feet (251 m).

== Tributaries and other locations ==
- Its tributaries are:
  - Lost Creek Road Fork 1.5 miles (2.4 km) upstream which used to be the route of the road to Lost Creek around Lost Mountain before the construction of the Daniel Boone Parkway, mouth at 37°18′10″N 83°09′51″W
    - Pigeon Roost Road Fork 0.75 miles (1.21 km) upstream at an altitude of 1,000 feet (300 m) which likewise used to be the route of the road to the Pigeon Roost Branch of Troublesome Creek, mouth at 37°18′44″N 83°10′09″W
  - Jake Fork (a.k.a. Jake Branch) 1 mile (1.6 km) upstream at an altitude of 880 feet (270 m), mouth at 37°17′51″N 83°10′06″W
    - Sang Fork 1.5 miles (2.4 km) upstream (of Jake) at an altitude of 1,220 feet (370 m), mouth at 37°18′10″N 83°08′41″W

=== General ===
The Holliday post office was the earliest one established in the Lotts Creek area. It was established on 1901-10-04 by postmaster Sherman B. Holliday, and located (according to its application form) 5 miles (8.0 km) north of Hazard and 3.5 miles (5.6 km) south of Dwarf post office (on Troublesome Creek), which places it at the mouth of a tributary of Trace Fork that was known as Godsey Fork. Holliday had originally wanted the name Orear, after Edward C. O'Rear. Holliday himself was a descendant of one John H. Holliday, who had come to Troublesome in 1821 and was one of the early judges in Perry County. The Holliday mine was 1 mile (1.6 km) upstream from the mouth of Trace Fork.

=== Brushy/Godsey/Danger/Lost Creek Road Fork ===
==== Heiner and Whitsett ====
A tributary earlier named Brushy Fork, and later to be Godsey Fork, was the location of a mine opened by the Pioneer Coal Company, and its mining camp was named Heiner. The land was owned by a Charles Godsey. It was also known as Danger Fork, after local landowner "Danger Nick" Combs, and Heiner was the terminus of another L&N spur railway line.

A Heiner post office was established on 1918-10-18 by postmaster Zack Grass, and a small village named Whitsett was further upstream. The Kentucky River Coal Company, which was operated by R. C. Whitsett, had a tipple and conveyor at Whitsett. The Heiner post office and railway station were officially renamed Pioneer on 1927-11-22, but by 1936 they had gone back to being named Heiner. The post office closed in 1944.

Ralph Crowford Whitsett was president and general manager of three coal mining companies, including the Kentucky River Coal Mining company of Hazard. This company in 1919 leased mining rights 1 mile (1.6 km) upstream along Danger Fork.

==== Bulan ====
Also on the Danger Fork spur line was the station of Downing. The Bulan post office was established on 1919-05-15 by postmaster Evan Riley Nicholson, 1.5 miles (2.4 km) up Trace Fork. It served the Downing railway station and the nearby mining camp of the Lotts Creek Coal Company.

Bulan post office moved 300 yards (270 m) south in 1922 to serve Duane railway station, and the town of Bulan still exists between the mouths of Jake Branch and Godsey Fork. The post office still exists (37°17′22″N 83°10′45″W), and there are a number of stores and, now, private homes. Because many people carried guns in Bulan in the 1920s, it gained the local nickname Pistol City.

=== Jake Fork ===
Jake Branch was the location of a spur railway line built by the L&N in 1918 between Duane station and Hardburly. It was completed on 1919-09-30, the same time as another L&N spur from Danfork to Whitsett (below) was completed. The line from North Hazard to Danfork had been completed earlier that year on 1919-03-13.

The Tribbey post office was established on 1919-10-02 by postmaster Henry G. Harp between Bulan and Hardburly on Jake Fork, and that was also the name of a railway station on the spur line down Jake. They were both to support another mine, the post office outlasting the mine closure by some while, eventually to close in 1984.

Additional mines included mines along Jake Branch owned by Noah Smith.

==== Burlingham, Hardy-Burlingham, and Hardburly ====
What was later to be the mining town of Hardburly began as station at the head of the aforementioned Jake Branch spur line, named Burlingham after William Burlingham, owner of the Hardy-Burlingham (Coal) Mining Company. It gained a post office, established on 1918-04-17 by postmaster Albert Kirk. This was initially to be named Burlingham too, but was instead named Hardburly, which the town and the railway station were renamed to match.

As a mining town it had its own company store, hospital, doctor's office, dentist, dry cleaner, baseball field, tennis courts, and a Y.M.C.A. building; with the company providing free electricity to the boarding-houses and homes for around 487 mine-workers.

The mine closed in 1955, but the post office (37°18′04″N 83°07′46″W) and several houses from the mining camp remain, partly as a result of local self-improvement efforts in 1966. With help from a USDA Federal Extension Service specialist from the University of Kentucky local community members organized to form the Hardburly Association and create a water system, local dump, garbage collections, and a park; with the money needed raised by holding community events.

== See also ==
- List of rivers of Kentucky

== Sources ==
- Hodge, James Michael (1918). Coals of the North Fork of Kentucky River in Perry and Portions of Breathitt and Knott Counties. Reports of the Kentucky Geological Survey 1912–1918 4th series. Vol. 3. Frankfort, Kentucky: The State Journal Company. (Coals of the North Fork of Kentucky River in Perry and Portions of Breathitt and Knott Counties at the Internet Archive)
- Rennick, Robert M. (2000). "Perry County – Post Offices". County Histories of Kentucky. No. 273. Morehead State University.
- Helping Others Catch Up. Program aid. Vol. 903. United States Department of Agriculture Federal Extension Service. February 1969.
- Herr, Kincaid A. (2021). The Louisville and Nashville Railroad, 1850–1963. University Press of Kentucky. ISBN 978-0-8131-8726-6. (originally Herr, Kincaid A. (1943). "The Louisville & Nashville Railroad, 1850–1942". L. & N. Magazine.)
- Quigley, Martha Hall (2006). Railroading Around Hazard and Perry County. Images of America. Arcadia Publishing. ISBN 978-0-7385-4273-7.
- "Geological Formation Favors Operation". The Black Diamond. Vol. 62, no. 1. National Coal Exchange. 1919.
- "Weekly Review of Coal Trade". The Black Diamond. Vol. 74, no. 23. National Coal Exchange. 1925.
- "News of the mines". The Coal Industry. Vol. 2. Andresen Company. November 1919.
- Hull, Arthur M.; Hale, Sydney A., eds. (1918). Coal Men of America: A Biographical and Historical Review of the World's Greatest Industry. Retail Coalman.
