= Louise Barton Freeman =

American geologist

- Born: March 3, 1908; Erlanger, Kentucky, U.S.
- Died: July 30, 2004 (aged 96); Texas, U.S.
- Other name: Louise B. Clarkson
- Occupation: Geologist

Louise A. Barton Freeman Clarkson (March 3, 1908 – July 30, 2004) was an American geologist. She worked for Kentucky Department of Mines and Minerals and for the Kentucky Geological Survey, and taught geology at the University of Kentucky. She and her second husband had a geology consulting firm in Corpus Christi and Abilene, Texas.

== Early life and education ==
Barton was born in Erlanger, Kentucky, the daughter of Winfield Scott Barton and Estella Roosevelt Maxey Barton. Her father was in the oil business. She graduated from the University of Kentucky in 1932, and earned a master's degree there in 1934. She completed a Ph.D. in geology at the University of Chicago in 1940.

== Career ==
Freeman worked for Kentucky Department of Mines and Minerals and for the Kentucky Geological Survey, and taught geology at the University of Kentucky. She spoke colleagues at the Appalachian Geological Society in 1939, and at meetings of the Kentucky Oil and Gas Association in 1940 and 1942. She was a fellow of the Geological Society of America, and a member of the American Association of Petroleum Geologists, the American Geophysical Union, and the Society of Economic Mineralogists and Paleontologists.

She held a pilot's license and was active in the Ninety-Nines, an organization for women in aviation. She spoke on "The Life of a Woman Geologist" at a women's club event in 1958. With her second husband she had a geology consulting firm in Texas, and both attended the International Geological Congress in Copenhagen in 1960. They were also involved in the Corpus Christi Art Foundation and the Art Museum of South Texas, and she was founding treasurer of the Corpus Christi Chamber Music Society.

== Publications ==
- "Rogers Gap and Fulton formations in central Kentucky" (1935, with Arthur Crane McFarlan)
- Preliminary Report on the 'McClosky' Oil Horizon in Western Kentucky (1938)
- "Present Status of St. Peter Problem in Kentucky" (1939)
- "Big Sinking Field, Lee County, Kentucky" (1941)
- "Devonian Subsurface Strata in Western Kentucky" (1941, based on her dissertation)
- "'Corniferous' at Irvine, Estill County, Kentucky" (1944, with A. C. McFarlan and Vincent E. Nelson)
- "Production - Domestic - Oil and Gas Development in Kentucky during 1943" (1944, with Coleman D. Hunter)
- "Paleozoic Geology of the Jackson Purchase Region" (1945)
- "Regional Aspects of Cambrian and Ordovician Subsurface Stratigraphy in Kentucky" (1949)
- "Regional Aspects of Silurian and Devonian Subsurface Stratigraphy in Kentucky" (1951)

== Personal life ==
Barton married John Duvall Freeman in 1934. They divorced in 1951, and she soon remarried, to fellow geologist Francis R. Clarkson. She died in 2004, at the age of 96, in Texas.
