= Mother Goose House =

Coordinates: 37°16′22″N 83°11′35″W

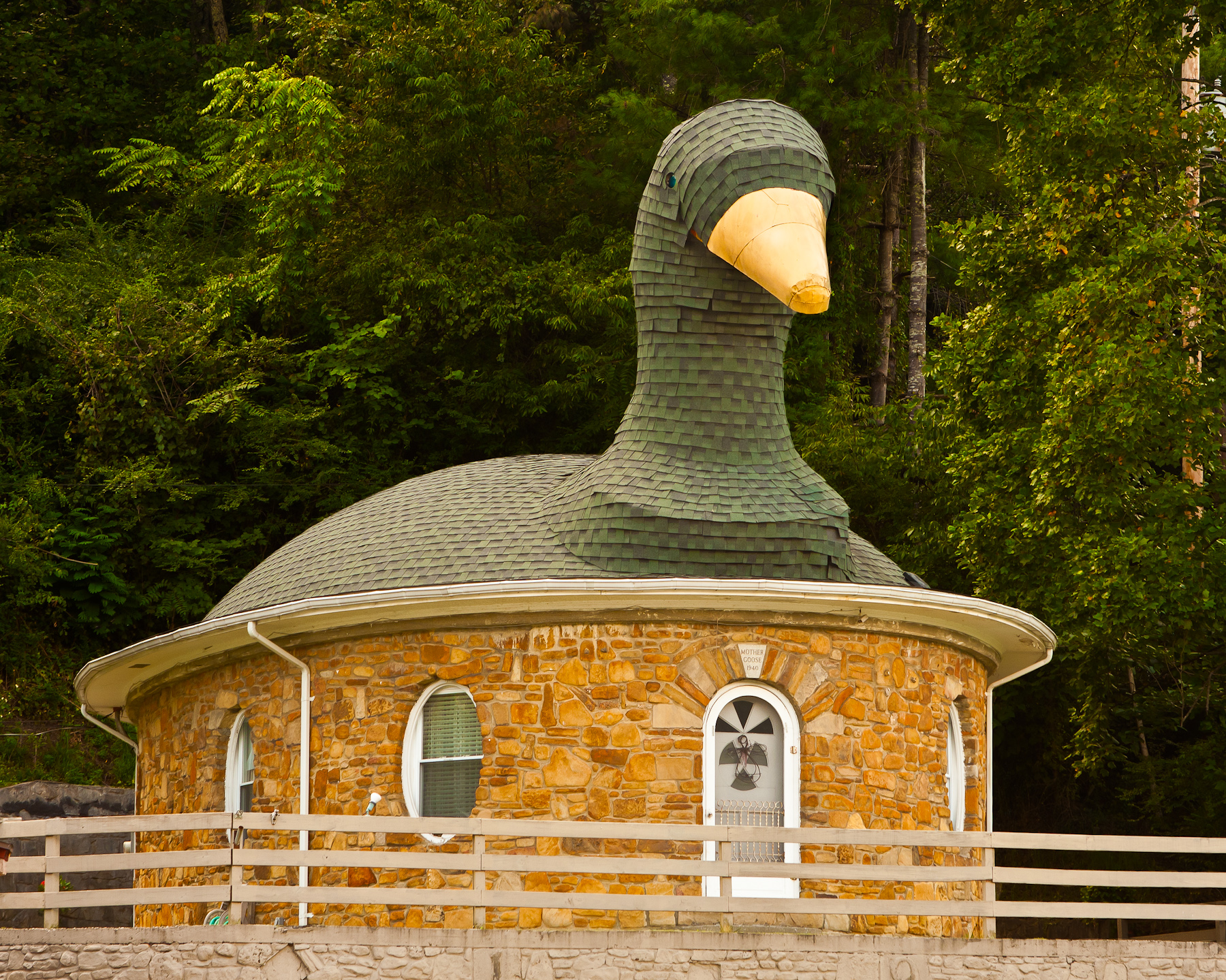
- Interactive map of the Mother Goose House area

General information
- Status: Open
- Location: Hazard, Kentucky
- Opened: 1940

The Mother Goose House is a bed and breakfast and monument in Hazard, Kentucky. In 1930, Hazard resident George Stacy took inspiration to build a home in the shape of a goose after his wife had skinned the body of one he had brought home for Thanksgiving. Construction started on the Mother Goose in 1935 and was completed in 1940. The monument is a circular-shaped building with a goose's upper body on the top half and oval-shaped windows. It is made out of rocks from many American states and Canada. Over the years before officially becoming a bed and breakfast, it was home to many owners, a store for many years under the name "The Mother Goose Market", and a Filling Station.

Starting in the late 1980s to current day, the Mother Goose's head has gone through many renovations for reasons such as water leakage. On March 24, 2021, the head of the Mother Goose House fell off due to its wood becoming damp from heavy rain and snow. The current owner of the Mother Goose Alice McIntosh stated "She will rise again", and that "It wouldn't be Hazard without the goose." The official Twitter page for the city of Hazard described the house as “beloved” and stated “She will be back.” The building was under renovation from mid-March to August 26, 2021. The head of the goose was set back into place on August 27, 2021, after going through a series of remodeling, such as replacing the neck's planks, replacing the beak with a stronger plastic material hold, and replacing the eyes with a much lighter orange color from its original yellow glow. Damage done in the attic was also repaired, such as the flooring, rafters and the main beam that held up the Goose's head that were damaged from the March 24th fall.

The Mother Goose House was featured on The Oprah Winfrey Show and Home and Garden Television's Extreme Homes. It also was featured in the New York Times. It was featured on the cover of the Hazard-based board game Hazard-opoly.
