= Elijah Combs =

American politician (1770–1855)

'General' Elijah Combs (April 17, 1770 in Frederick County, Virginia – September 12, 1855 in Hazard, Perry County, Kentucky), was the son of John Combs and his wife, Nancy Harding. He migrated to Kentucky from North Carolina in 1792 bringing with him his wife and several slaves (called: 'Anne', 'Nance' and 'Jake'). He is listed as deeding roughly 10 acres for what became the Town of Hazard to the town in 1826.

Elijah was the Founder of Hazard, Perry County, Kentucky on November 2, 1820, which he named after General Oliver Hazard Perry, a hero of the War of 1812. Perry County was formed by the Kentucky General Assembly from portions of Clay and Floyd Counties in Kentucky.

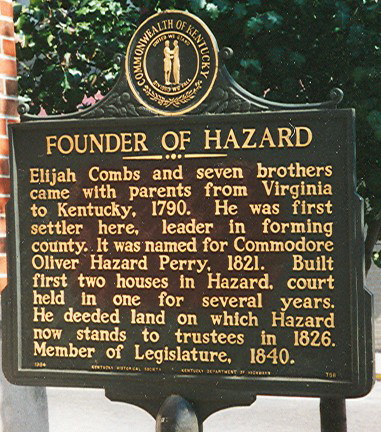
Elijah Combs

In addition to founding Hazard, Elijah was a Whig politician. In 1832 he was listed as the Jailer for Perry County. In 1833 he was listed as its Magistrate. In 1836 and 1837 he was listed as the Sheriff. In 1840 he served in the Kentucky State House.

Elijah went by the title 'General' and was known to dress up as a 'general' in his regimental uniform as the 'General of the local militia' for Hazard and Perry County. Although no evidence of an actual command as a General has been found, he is listed as making a materials request after the War of 1812 (for the State of Kentucky).

During the 1840 Presidential Election, Elijah was running for a seat in the Kentucky House of Representatives which he won. He gave speeches on behalf of the Whig candidate for president, William Henry Harrison.

Elijah married Sarah 'Sally' Roark, the daughter of patriot US Revolutionary militia war spy, Michael Roark.

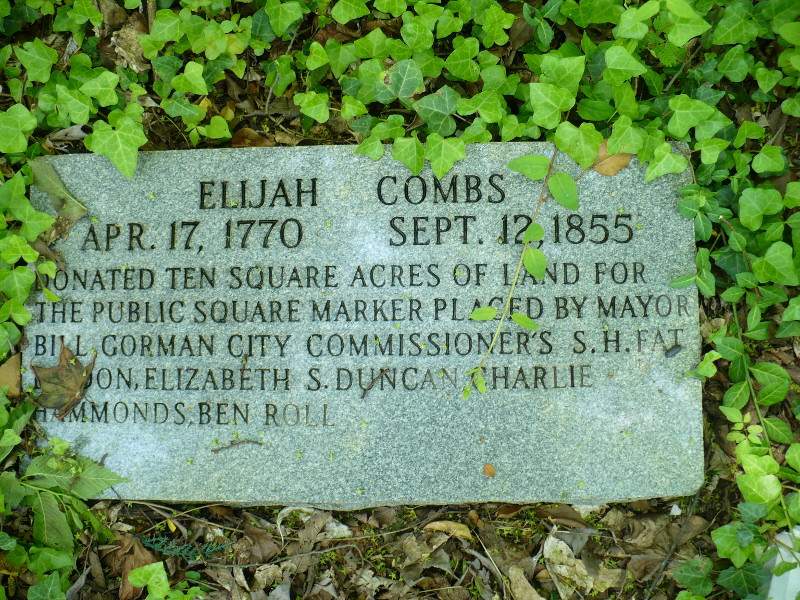
Elijah Combs (founder of Hazard and Perry County, Ky) memorial Marker (not actual grave marker)

His father-in-law, Michael Roark was paid by the US government to spy on the Creek and Cherokee Indians. Some historians think that Elijah also participated in the War of 1812 in either the Creek War in the Southern States or on the Canadian frontier. Since he named the town and County after Oliver Hazard Perry, a leader in battles at the Canada–US border, questions surround the connection.

Elijah and Sally had 6 known children:

- Jesse Combs (1798–1874) Clerk of the Perry County Court until his death
- Mary "Polly" Combs
- Lucinda "Cindy" Combs
- Jackson G. Combs (1816–1857)
- Elijah Combs Jr. (1819–1866)
- Jade Miller (1815–unknown)

== See also ==
- North Fork tributaries at Hazard, Kentucky#Combs station and the Combs family
