= Lotts Creek (Kentucky) =

River in Kentucky, United States

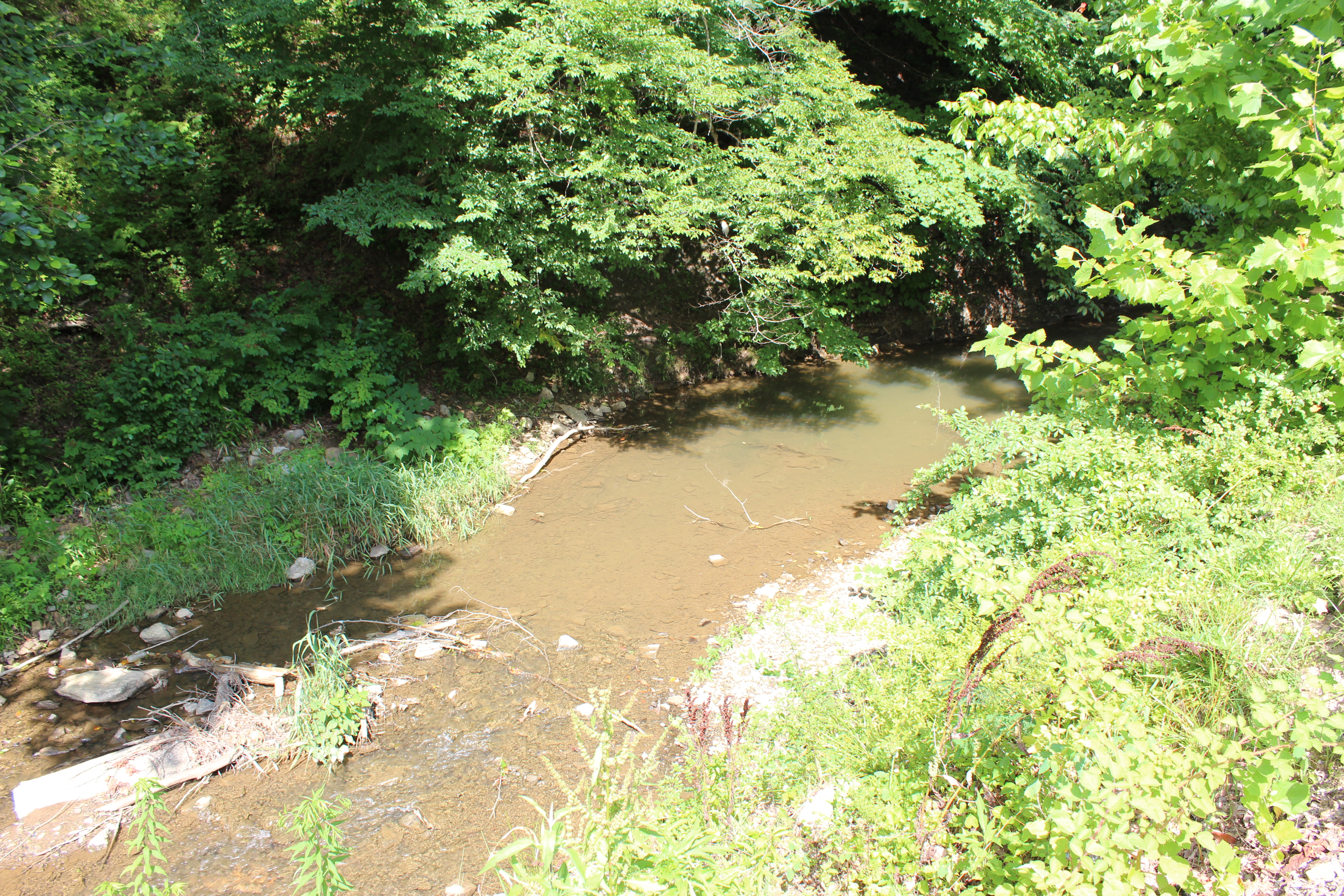
- Lotts Creek

Physical characteristics
- Source: Young's Fork headwaters
  - coordinates: 37°16′55″N 83°01′53″W
- 2nd source: Kelly/Big Fork headwaters
  - coordinates: 37°16′20″N 83°00′53″W
- 3rd source: Clear Fork headwaters
  - coordinates: 37°16′55″N 83°05′19″W
- 4th source: Grigsby Creek headwaters
  - coordinates: 37°17′40″N 83°07′57″W
- Mouth: North Fork Kentucky River
  - location: North Fork tributaries at Hazard, Kentucky
  - coordinates: 37°16′57″N 83°11′32″W
  - elevation: 820 feet (250 m)
- Width
  - minimum: 6 feet (1.8 m)
  - maximum: 25 feet (7.6 m)

Lotts Creek is a creek in Perry County and Knott County, Kentucky in the United States. It is a tributary of the North Fork Kentucky River that joins it at Darfork 3 miles (4.8 km) downstream of Hazard at an altitude of 820 feet (250 m). It is 8.5 miles (13.7 km) long from its mouth to where it splits into the Young's (a.k.a. Young) and Kelly (a.k.a. Big) Forks.

The most likely source of the name "Lotts" is a William Harrison Lott of Clark County, however there is contradictory evidence on various historical maps, including a spelling "Lots" that is used after 1850, where before 1850 it was regularly spelled "Lotts". The "Lots" spelling, according to one story, comes from when landowner "Danger Nick" Combs fenced off his land into lots; but in 1939 the U.S. Board on Geographic Names settled on the "Lotts" spelling.

== Tributaries and other locations ==
The mouth of Lotts Creek at the North Fork tributaries at Hazard, Kentucky is at altitude 820 feet (250 m) above sea level, with the highway bridge that crosses it there being at altitude 842 feet (257 m).

The course of the river is generally north-westerly, with an overall gradient of 22.64 feet per mile (4.288 m/km). Along most of its course it flows through tree-lined valleys, widening to 10 to 12 feet (3.0 to 3.7 m) at Grigsby, with scattered residential development across almost wholly private property. The creek bed is mainly rocky, with sand bars and gravel islands in its lower half where it widens to 20 to 25 feet (6.1 to 7.6 m) wide.

- Its major tributaries are:
  - Trace Fork 1 mile (1.6 km) upstream at an altitude of 825 feet (251 m), mouth 37°17′18″N 83°10′45″W whose further tributaries and locations are in its article
  - Grigsby Creek upstream from the Lotts Creek Community Church, mouth 37°17′12″N 83°08′24″W
  - Elk Fork 5.5 miles (8.9 km) upstream at an altitude of 945 feet (288 m), mouth 37°16′46″N 83°07′27″W
  - Clear Fork 6 miles (9.7 km) upstream at an altitude of 960 feet (290 m), mouth 37°17′00″N 83°07′09″W
  - Dickson Branch 8.25 miles (13.28 km) upstream at an altitude of 1,005 feet (306 m), mouth 37°15′47″N 83°05′24″W
  - Young's Fork 9.75 miles (15.69 km) upstream at an altitude of 1,060 feet (320 m), confluence with Kelly/Big at 37°16′04″N 83°04′04″W
    - Buck Branch 0.5 miles (0.80 km) upstream, mouth at 37°16′19″N 83°03′43″W
    - Elk Lick Fork 1.25 miles (2.01 km) upstream at an altitude of 1,140 feet (350 m), mouth at 37°16′39″N 83°02′58″W
  - Kelly Fork (a.k.a. Big Fork) 9.75 miles (15.69 km) upstream at an altitude of 1,060 feet (320 m)

=== Darfork ===
The name of Darfork has more confusion surrounding it than "Lotts". It has variously been "Danfork", "Darkfork", and even "Darbfork".

Darfork was the name of a coal town, railway station, and post office that were used by the Darb Fork Coal Company and was in fact 0.5 miles (0.80 km) upstream from the river mouth. The post office was established on 1927-12-12 by Kelley Lee Phillips and was originally to be called either Tauber or Urschel. Tauber was the station on the local railway spur line along Lotts Creek. This line had a further spur going up what was then called Danger Fork, after the aforementioned "Danger Nick" Combs.

Adding to the confusion are the Dark Fork (as named in 1914) minor tributary between the mouth of Lotts Creek and Trace Fork, whose local community was named Darb Fork, and where the Darfork post office moved to in 1936. Dark Fork had been earlier known as the Helen Combs branch, and was later renamed Darb Fork on maps; and after a series of short local moves the Darfork post office closed in 1965.

A L&N railway spur line along Lotts Creek from North Hazard to Danfork was completed on 1919-03-13, and was followed the same year by further spurs from Danfork up Trace Fork (q.v.).

=== Grigsby ===
Grigsby Creek was named for a family of Grigsbys, descendants of a Thomas Grigsby who was a fellow settler with "Danger Nick" Combs. A Grigsby post office was established on 1904-10-05 by Cora Grigsby, slightly upstream from the creek mouth and 0.5 miles (0.80 km) east of the church. The post office closed in 1933.

In 1918, D. Grigsby had a mine here.

=== Cordia ===
The Cordia post office was established on 1899-10-10 by postmater Cora Everidge. The origin of the name is unknown, with possibilities including Everidge's sister and "Uncle Solomon" Everidge's second wife Cordia "Aunt Cord" Combs. Everidge's original choice of name, rejected by the USPS, had been Mason. Its probable location, from information on the application form, was at the mouth of Coles Fork, a minor fork of Lotts. It was moved downstream to just downstream of the Lotts Creek (a.k.a. Cordia) school after the latter was established in 1933, and closed in 1957.

=== Elic and the Kelly and Young's Forks ===
The Elic post office was established on 1908-08-04 by postmaster Adeline Young. It was initially on Kelly Fork, 3 miles (4.8 km) upstream of where Cordia was located at the time. It was named after Adeline's father Alexander "Elic" Young. It later moved 0.5 miles (0.80 km) along Young's and closed in 1934.

In 1918, Mansard Young had a mine on Buck Branch, and Reese Young had one on a minor left fork of Young's Fork 1.75 miles (2.82 km) upstream. John Young owned land 2 miles (3.2 km) upstream on Young's Fork, and William Young had a mine on Elk Lick Fork 1 mile (1.6 km) upstream.

Thomas Kelly's mine was 1 mile (1.6 km) upstream on Kelly Fork, and Benjamin Everidge's 1.125 miles (1.811 km) upstream.

== See also ==
- List of rivers of Kentucky

== Sources ==
- Hodge, James Michael (1918). Coals of the North Fork of Kentucky River in Perry and Portions of Breathitt and Knott Counties. Reports of the Kentucky Geological Survey 4th series 1912–1918. Vol. 3. Frankfort, Kentucky: The State Journal Company. (Coals of the North Fork of Kentucky River in Perry and Portions of Breathitt and Knott Counties at the Internet Archive)
- Rennick, Robert M. (2000). Perry County – Post Offices. County Histories of Kentucky. Morehead State University.
- Rennick, Robert M. (2000). Knott County – Post Offices. County Histories of Kentucky. Morehead State University.
- Herr, Kincaid A. (2021). The Louisville and Nashville Railroad, 1850–1963. University Press of Kentucky. ISBN 978-0-8131-8726-6.
- Maccracken, Jim (2017). "Lotts Creek". Knott County Kentucky Fishing & Floating Guide Book. Kentucky Fishing & Floating Guide Books. Recreational Guides.
