= WQXY =

Hazard, Kentucky; United States
- Frequency: 1560 kHz
- Branding: Good Time Oldies

Programming
- Format: Defunct (formerly Oldies)
- Affiliations: Jones Radio Network

Ownership
- Owner: Black Gold Broadcasting

History
- First air date: March 5, 1987 (as WYZQ)
- Former call signs: WYZQ (1987–1990)

Technical information
- Facility ID: 5466
- Class: D
- Power: 1,000 watts day 500 watts critical hours
- Transmitter coordinates: 37°16′27″N 83°11′29″W

WQXY (1560 AM) was a radio station broadcasting an oldies format. Licensed to Hazard, Kentucky, United States, the station was owned by Black Gold Broadcasting and featured programming from CNN Radio and Jones Radio Network.

== History ==
The station went on the air as WYZQ on March 5, 1987. On October 10, 1990, the station changed its call sign to WQXY.

On September 30, 2015, the Federal Communications Commission (FCC) informed WQXY's owners that it intended to cancel the station's license due to WQXY having been silent since August 1, 2014. In response, Black Gold Broadcasting surrendered the license to the FCC on October 7, 2015.
