= Balls Fork =

River in Kentucky, United States

Coordinates: 37°22′46″N 83°08′52″W

Balls Fork is a stream that is mainly in Knott County, Kentucky in the United States. It a fork of the Troublesome Creek tributary of the North Fork Kentucky River that it joins over the county line in Perry County. It is 19.5 miles (31.4 km) long.

It is not known where its name comes from. Unlike many other locations in Kentucky, there are no local families recorded with the surname Balls for whom it could have been named.

== Tributaries and other locations ==
The mouth of Balls Fork is 23.875 miles (38.423 km) upstream on Troublesome at an altitude of 835 feet (255 m).

- Its major tributaries are:
  - Lick Branch 0.75 miles (1.21 km) upstream at an altitude of 840 feet (260 m)
  - Georges Branch 1.25 miles (2.01 km) upstream at an altitude of 850 feet (260 m)
  - Roaring Branch 3.875 miles (6.236 km) upstream at an altitude of 900 feet (270 m)
    - Elisha Fork 0.25 miles (0.40 km) upstream at an altitude of 985 feet (300 m)
  - Big Branch 4.75 miles (7.64 km) upstream at an altitude of 915 feet (279 m)
    - Beech Creek 0.375 miles (0.604 km) upstream at an altitude of 935 feet (285 m)
    - Sand Lick Branch 1.5 miles (2.4 km) upstream at an altitude of 1,030 feet (310 m)
    - Road Branch 2.625 miles (4.225 km) upstream at an altitude of 1,110 feet (340 m)
    - Right Fork 3.75 miles (6.04 km) upstream at an altitude of 1,160 feet (350 m)
  - Zach Branch 5.75 miles (9.25 km) upstream at an altitude of 930 feet (280 m)
  - Rattlesnake Branch (also Cutoff Branch) 8 miles (13 km) upstream at an altitude of 955 feet (291 m)
  - Laurel Creek 11.625 miles (18.709 km) upstream at an altitude of 1,010 feet (310 m)
  - Hard Branch 12.75 miles (20.52 km) upstream at an altitude of 1,020 feet (310 m)
  - Old Trace Branch (also John S. Combs Branch) 13.25 miles (21.32 km) upstream at an altitude of 1,030 feet (310 m)
  - Old-house Branch 13.375 miles (21.525 km) upstream at an altitude of 1,030 feet (310 m)
  - Trace Branch 13.75 miles (22.13 km) upstream at an altitude of 1,035 feet (315 m)
  - Pond Branch 14.75 miles (23.74 km) upstream at an altitude of 1,045 feet (319 m)
  - Knob Bottom Branch 15 miles (24 km) upstream at an altitude of 1,050 feet (320 m)
  - Garden Branch 15.375 miles (24.744 km) upstream at an altitude of 1,055 feet (322 m)
  - Sand Lick Branch 15.75 miles (25.35 km) upstream at an altitude of 1,060 feet (320 m)
  - Stewart Fork (also Terry Fork) 16 miles (26 km) upstream at an altitude of 1,065 feet (325 m)
  - Gearhart Branch (also Mill Branch) 17 miles (27 km) upstream at an altitude of 1,080 feet (330 m)
    - Conley Branch (also Little Branch) 0.125 miles (0.201 km) upstream at an altitude of 1,095 feet (334 m)
  - Buck Branch 17.75 miles (28.57 km) upstream at an altitude of 1,090 feet (330 m)
  - Wiley Branch 18.25 miles (29.37 km) upstream at an altitude of 1,100 feet (340 m)
    - Combs Fork 0.75 miles (1.21 km) upstream at an altitude of 1,125 feet (343 m)
      - Hurricane Branch 0.75 miles (1.21 km) upstream at an altitude of 1,155 feet (352 m)
    - Georges Branch 1.125 miles (1.811 km) upstream at an altitude of 1,150 feet (350 m)
  - Bowling Fork 18.875 miles (30.376 km) upstream at an altitude of 1,140 feet (350 m)
  - Long Fork 19.75 miles (31.78 km) upstream at an altitude of 1,200 feet (370 m)

=== General ===
The current Ary post office at the mouth of Balls Fork is actually on Troublesome Creek itself, as was the original site of the earlier Troublesome post office that served Balls Fork from 1882.

Balls Fork had six post offices in its history actually on the fork itself or its tributaries. Three of them were refused the name Ball by the USPS because it had already been taken.

The Talcum post office, an attempted Ball, was established on 1903-02-25 by postmaster Levi Collins. It was located at the mouth of Cutoff Branch. After closing in February 1913 it was reëstablished by postmaster Mrs Ida Francis on 1917-04-21. It moved along Balls Fork several times in its lifetime, ending up 3.5 miles (5.6 km) downstream from where it started. It closed in 1994.

The Yellow Mountain post office was established on 1909-03-30 by husband and wife postmasters Reece F. and Louelzia Bolen. It was on Mill Branch, 0.5 miles (0.80 km) upstream and named after the Yellow Mountain there. It closed in 1951.

In 1918, Bud Dobson's mine was on a minor branch 11 miles (18 km) upstream on Balls itself.; and William Messer's 1.5 miles (2.4 km) upstream on Old Trace Branch.

Joseph Sutton's mine was on a minor fork of Trace Branch, 1 mile (1.6 km) upstream; John Ooten's on a minor branch of Pond Branch, 0.5 miles (0.80 km) upstream; Lewis Evans's 0.275 miles (0.443 km) upstream on Pond itself; and Joseph Patten's Balls itself, 17.5 miles (28.2 km) upstream;

Richard Smith had a mine one on Wiley Branch, 0.5 miles (0.80 km) upstream; and John Smith one on Wiley Branch, 2.75 miles (4.43 km) upstream.

Grant Moore had a mine on Wiley Branch, 0.625 miles (1.006 km) upstream; and Solomon Sloane one 0.25 miles (0.40 km) upstream on Hurricane Branch.

William Stewart had a mine on Stewart Fork, 0.875 miles (1.408 km) upstream; and John Conley one on Conley Branch, 1 mile (1.6 km) upstream.

Georges Branch is across a ridge from the Coles Branch of Troublesome Creek.

=== Vest and the Grigsby family mines and post offices ===
A Balls Fork post office was on the Fork itself, 7 miles (11 km) upstream. It was established on 1879-09-11 by postmaster William G. Grigsby, and closed in December 1881. Although it would have been in Knott County today, it predated the creation of that county.

James M. Grigsby's mine was on Old House Branch, 0.5 miles (0.80 km) upstream.

The Vest post office, an attempted Ball, was established on 1886-01-31 by postmaster William Grigsby. Anecdotally, although there is no record of such a person, it was named after a USPS official who validated the requirement for a post office. It still exists today, and around it are a consolidated school, a store, and a crafts centre.

=== Combs family mines and post offices ===
The Bearville post office was established in 1952 by postmaster Lucinda Combs. The name was a nickname of one of the members of a sprawling local family on Troublesome Creek and North Fork Kentucky River, one "Bear" Combs. It was on Big Branch, 1.5 miles (2.4 km) upstream. It closed in 1984.

Henry Combs's mine was 1 mile (1.6 km) upstream on Roaring Branch; J. S. Combs's was 0.25 miles (0.40 km) upstream on Hard Branch.

=== Triplett family mines and post offices ===
The Soft Shell post office, an attempted Ball, was established on 1926-05-04 by postmaster Sarah Triplett. It was named for the local Soft Shell church, a subgroup of Regular Baptists that differentiated themselves from the Hard Shell Baptists, and located on the mouth of Wiley Branch. It closed in 1983.

John L. Triplett had a mine one on Balls itself, 18.75 miles (30.18 km) upstream; and Thomas Triplett's land was 100 yards (91 m) farther up.

=== Richie/Ritchie family mines ===
Jason Richie had a mine on Beech Creek, 0.375 miles (0.604 km) upstream; Hiram Richie had one on a minor branch of a minor branch of Balls itself, 5.625 miles (9.053 km) upstream; and Peyton Richie one 13.25 miles (21.32 km) upstream on Balls.

=== Fugate family mines ===
In the Fugate family two brothers had mines on Georges Branch, 0.125 miles (0.201 km) and 0.25 miles (0.40 km) upstream; Daniel Fugate had a mine on a minor branch of Trace Branch, 1 mile (1.6 km) upstream; and Samuel Fugate had a mine 3.125 miles (5.029 km) upstream on Balls Fork itself.

=== Gearhart family mines ===
W. F. Gearheart had a mine on a minor branch of Laurel Creek, 2 miles (3.2 km) upstream; Lewis Gearhart one on Sand Lick Branch just over 1.75 miles (2.82 km) upstream past a spring; Elhannon Gearhart one on Balls itself, 15.125 miles (24.341 km) upstream; Martha Gearhart one on a minor fork of Balls, 16.25 miles (26.15 km) upstream; and Allen Gearhart one on Buck Branch, 0.25 miles (0.40 km) upstream.

=== Patrick family mines ===
Rachel Patrick's mine was on a minor fork of Sand Lick Branch, 0.625 miles (1.006 km) upstream. and James Patrick's was on a minor fork of Road Branch, 0.25 miles (0.40 km) upstream.

=== Terry family mines ===
Thomas Terry had a mine on Right Fork of Big Branch, 0.125 miles (0.201 km) upstream; Rebecca Terry one on a minor branch of Pond Branch, 0.75 miles (1.21 km) upstream; Bud Terry one on Pond itself, 1 mile (1.6 km) upstream; and Benjamin Terry one on a minor fork of Wiley Branch, 0.75 miles (1.21 km) upstream.

=== Bowling family mines ===
Green Bowling's two mines were on two minor forks of Balls, one 16.875 miles (27.158 km) upstream and the other 17 miles (27 km) upstream. William Bowling's mine was 0.75 miles (1.21 km) upstream on Buck Branch.

== See also ==
- List of rivers of Kentucky

== Sources ==
- Hodge, James Michael (1918). Coals of the North Fork of Kentucky River in Perry and Portions of Breathitt and Knott Counties. Reports of the Kentucky Geological Survey 4th series 1912–1918. Vol. 3. Frankfort, Kentucky: The State Journal Company. (Coals of the North Fork of Kentucky River in Perry and Portions of Breathitt and Knott Counties at the Internet Archive)
- Rennick, Robert M. (2000). Perry County — Post Offices. County Histories of Kentucky. Vol. 273. Morehead State University.
- Rennick, Robert M. (2000). Knott County — Post Offices. County Histories of Kentucky. Vol. 237. Morehead State University.
