= North Fork Kentucky River =

River in Kentucky, United States

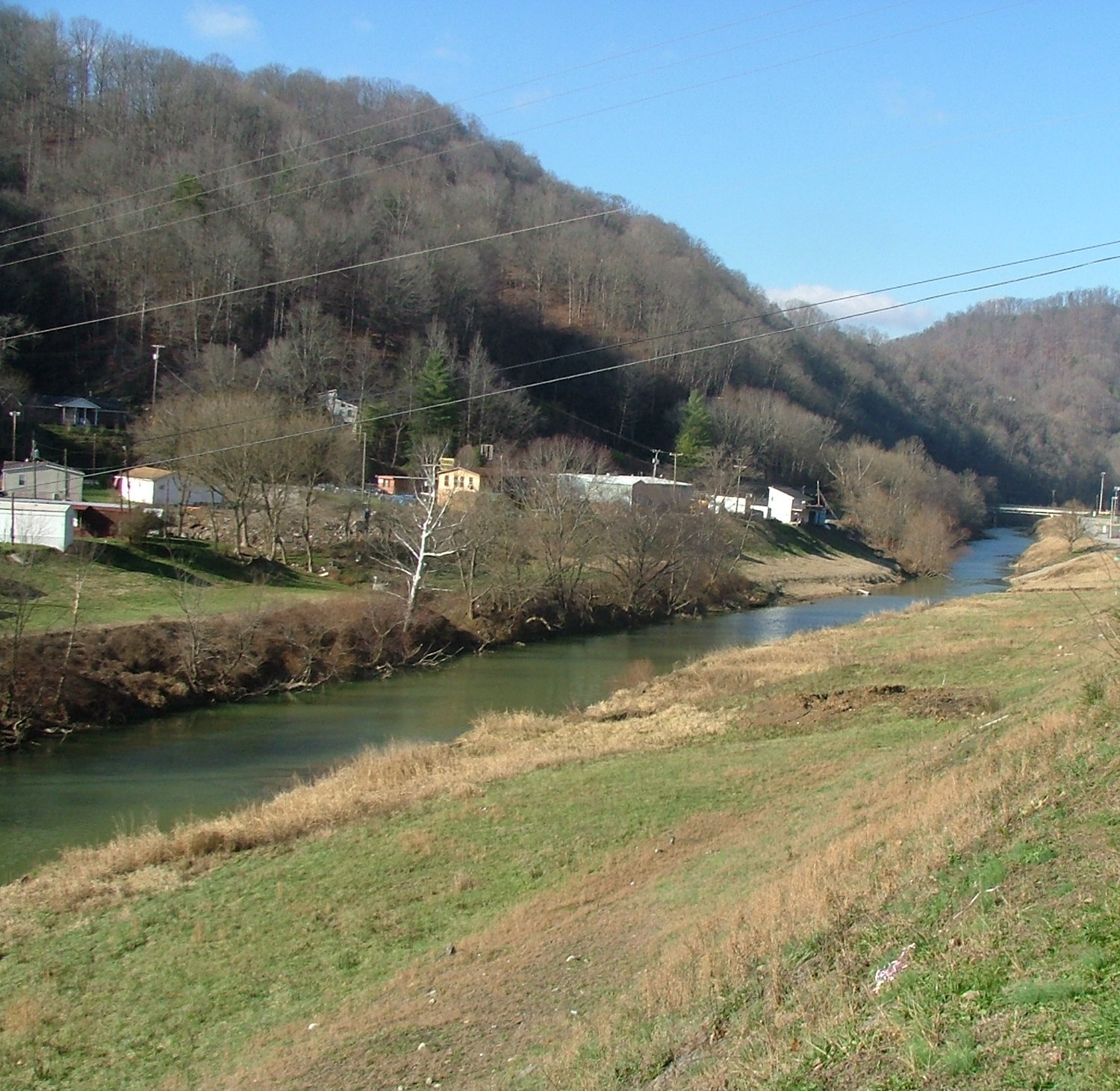
- North Fork viewed from Perry County Park

Physical characteristics
- Source: Payne Gap
  - coordinates: 37°09′19″N 82°39′04″W
- 2nd source: The Forks of Troublesome
  - coordinates: 37°20′05″N 82°58′51″W
- 3rd source: Rockhouse Creek headwaters
  - coordinates: 37°15′02″N 82°42′25″W
- Mouth: Kentucky River
  - location: just upstream of Beattyville
  - coordinates: 37°35′12″N 83°40′12″W
- Length: 148 mi (238 km)
- Discharge
  - location: Hazard gage station (1940–1991)
  - minimum: 158 cubic feet per second (4,500 L/s)
  - maximum: 1,099 cubic feet per second (31,100 L/s)
- Discharge
  - location: Cowan Creek (at mouth) (1991)
  - minimum: 0.64 cubic feet per second (18 L/s)
  - maximum: 1.22 cubic feet per second (35 L/s)

North Fork Kentucky River is a river in Kentucky in the United States. It is a fork of the Kentucky River that it joins just upstream of Beattyville. It is nearly 148 miles (238 km) long with an average slope of 3.2 feet per mile (0.61 m/km), and an overall basin size (at Jackson) of 1,101 square miles (2,850 km^{2})

== Basin and hydrology ==
The river rises at Payne Gap in Letcher County, in the Appalachian plateaus, flowing initially westward past Whitesburg in the Kanawha section (of the Cumberland Plateau) north of Pine Mountain. Several of its early tributaries flow off the north side of Pine Mountain into it, one of the principal ones being Cowan Creek. The basin size within Letcher County is 131 square miles (340 km^{2}).

It then flows generally northwest, in a winding course, past Hazard and Jackson.

The discharge rate at Hazard varies seasonally, being high in the winter and spring and low in the summer and autumn. This is brought about by higher rainfall during the first half of the calendar year, and regularly causes floods in the spring.

=== Water quality, and connections to mining ===
Half of one percent of the area of the North Fork Kentucky River basin has been disturbed by mining. As a result of these land disturbances, the annual sediment yield for the North Fork basin is roughly 15 times the yield over the entire Kentucky River basin, at an estimated 1,500 short tons per square mile (530 t/km^{2}). Three quarters of the sediment load is deposited between Jackson and Heidelberg, estimated by the USGS and KGS to be mostly just upstream of the latter.

Because of the mining, the North Fork is also one of the three major sources of dissolved solids in the Kentucky River system. It is the origin of one third of the dissolved sulphates found in the Kentucky River, and the location of the highest concentrations of iron (more than 4 times the concentration over the whole Kentucky River basin), and manganese. The measured increases in dissolved solids over the years 1976–1986, between 3% and 10% per year, matched the increase in coal production during those same years.

Calcium and magnesium cations, one of the causes of water hardness, are elevated in the North Fork because of surface mining disturbances of calcium and magnesium bearing rock, the overall Kentucky River system being classified as hard to very hard, with exceptions in tributaries that are unaffected by Eastern Kentucky Coalfield mining. The North Fork is responsible for one third of the Kentucky River's dissolved magnesium and one tenth of its dissolved calcium.

Not enough data are available to explain the elevated aluminium concentrations in the North Fork, as few samples have been taken with highly fluctuating measurements, but the elevated barium concentrations correlate with the suspended sediment measurements and are thus attributed to underclay disturbances caused by mining, as do its elevated copper concentrations which are thus likewise attributed. The elevated concentrations of manganese are considered to be of natural origin, because although they are high in the mined parts of the North Fork basin, they are also high in other parts of the Kentucky River basin where there is no mining and no correlation with suspended sediment measurements.

=== Floods ===
The Kentucky River basin, including North Fork and its tributaries such as Troublesome, suffered a major flood in January and February 1957, although that did not exceed the highest on record for Troublesome itself at that point, which had been the flood of February 1939. The worst hit place was Hazard; but most of the settlements along the various tributaries were damaged to some degree.

== Biota ==
The North Fork was the location of seven species of freshwater mussels as of 1975, and their habitat had suffered from significant reduction since the start of the 20th century. The reservoir at Carr Fork has been classified as eutrophic because of the sedimentation.

Contrastingly, whilst Buckhorn Creek has been affected by mining activity, its biota were found to be surviving fairly well, with 42 species of fish observed in the 1960s and 1970s and several species of algae and benthic invertebrates. It is an important recolonization source for downstream Troublesome Creek.

== Tributaries and other locations ==
- Its major tributaries are:
  - Troublesome Creek, whose further tributaries and locations are in its article
  - Campbell Creek at altitude 785 feet (239 m) and the location of the Krypton railway station
    - Left Fork 0.75 miles (1.21 km) upstream at altitude 850 feet (260 m)
    - Right Branch 1.75 miles (2.82 km) upstream at altitude 955 feet (291 m)
    - Right Fork 2.25 miles (3.62 km) upstream at altitude 1,005 feet (306 m)
    - Left Fork 2.25 miles (3.62 km) upstream at altitude 1,005 feet (306 m)
  - Big Meadow Branch (a.k.a. Oliver Branch) 1.25 miles (2.01 km) upstream of Krypton at altitude 790 feet (240 m)
  - Little Meadow Branch 2 miles (3.2 km) upstream of Krypton at altitude 795 feet (242 m)
  - Cary Branch 1.25 miles (2.01 km) downstream of Yerkes at altitude 800 feet (240 m)
  - Forked Mouth Creek, the location of the Yerkes railway station at altitude 795 feet (242 m)
    - Laurel Fork 0.375 miles (0.604 km) upstream
    - Colwell Fork 0.5 miles (0.80 km) upstream at altitude 855 feet (261 m)
    - Ivy Gap Fork 1 mile (1.6 km) upstream at altitude 885 feet (270 m)
  - Willard Creek at altitude 800 feet (240 m), whose further tributaries and locations are in its article
  - Ben Couch Branch 0.625 miles (1.006 km) downstream of Typo
  - the North Fork tributaries at Hazard, Kentucky, whose article includes further locations and:
    - Lower Second Creek
    - First Creek and the location of the Typo railway station
    - Lotts Creek, whose further tributaries and locations are in its own article
    - Upper Second Creek
    - Walker Branch
    - Gregory Branch
    - Big Creek at altitude 810 feet (250 m), whose further tributaries and locations are in its own article
  - Bear Branch 4.5 miles (7.2 km) upstream of Hazard at altitude 870 feet (270 m)
  - Buckeye Creek 5.75 miles (9.25 km) upstream of Hazard at altitude 875 feet (267 m)
  - Carr Fork 6.25 miles (10.06 km) upstream of Hazard at altitude 880 feet (270 m), whose further tributaries and locations are in its article
  - Macies Creek, whose further tributaries and locations are in its article
  - Big Branch 6 miles (9.7 km) upstream of Hazard at altitude 905 feet (276 m) and the location of the Hombre (now Fusonia) railway station
  - Ford Branch 1 mile (1.6 km) upstream of Hombre/Fusonia at altitude 915 feet (279 m)
  - Dike Branch 6 miles (9.7 km) upstream of Macies
  - Campbell Branch 7 miles (11 km) upstream of Macies at altitude 900 feet (270 m)
  - Brier Branch 7.5 miles (12.1 km) upstream of Macies at altitude 900 feet (270 m)
  - Leatherwood Creek 1 mile (1.6 km) upstream of Brier at altitude 905 feet (276 m) , whose further tributaries and locations are in its article
  - Bull Creek 4.5 miles (7.2 km) upstream of Hombre/Fusonia at altitude 930 feet (280 m)
    - Lick Branch at altitude 1,213 feet (370 m)
    - Meadow Branch
      - Little Meadow Branch
  - Line Fork at altitude 1,207 feet (368 m)
    - Bear Branch 3/4 mile (1.2 km) upstream
    - Campbell Branch
    - Long Branch
    - Saltlick Branch
    - Turkey Creek
      - Bates Fork
        - Left Fork
      - Bark Camp Branch
    - Tolby Branch
    - Whitaker Branch
    - Big Branch
    - Defeated Creek
      - Big Looney Branch
      - Oldhouse Branch
      - Wilson Fork (a.k.a. Right Fork)
      - Wolfpen Branch
      - Grassy Spring Branch
    - Ingram Creek
      - Flintfield Branch
    - Cornetts Branch
    - Picture Branch
    - Trace Branch
      - Shipley Fork
    - Long Branch
    - Coyle Branch
    - Jakes Branch
    - Bear Branch
  - Elk Creek
  - Rockhouse Creek just upstream of Blackey
    - Crases Branch 0.75 miles (1.21 km) upstream
    - Caudill Branch
    - Spring Branch
    - Doty Branch
    - Blair Branch
    - Garner Branch
    - Little Colly Creek the location of Tillie
      - Cow Branch
    - Elkhorn Branch
    - Daniels Branch
    - Camp Branch
      - Sugar Branch
      - Little Sandlick Branch
    - Trace Fork
    - Buck Creek
    - Beaverdam Branch
    - Indian Creek
    - Love Branch
    - Big Branch
    - Mill Creek
    - Stephens Fork
  - Tolson Branch
  - Mill Branch
  - Kings Creek
    - Big Bottom Branch
    - Muddy Branch
    - Lynn Branch
    - Carrion Branch
    - Fugate Branch
  - Smoot Creek
    - Johnson Branch
    - Bee-tree Branch
    - Trace Fork
  - Kingdom-come Creek
    - Frazier Branch
    - Alfred Branch
    - Cotton Patch Branch
    - Stillhouse Branch
    - Day Fork
    - Right Fork
  - Dry Fork
    - Stevens Branch
    - Loggy Hollow
  - Cowan Creek whose course is followed by Kentucky Highway 931
    - Little Cowan Creek whose course is followed by Kentucky Highway 2035
  - Sandlick Creek just upstream of which is Whitesburg
  - Crafts Colly Creek
    - Allen Branch
    - Licking Rock Branch
    - Right Fork
    - Stallards Fork
  - Cram Creek
  - Pine Creek
  - Bottom Fork
  - Thornton Creek
    - Wolf Pen Branch
  - Millstone Creek
    - Left Fork
      - Cane Fork
    - Right Fork
      - Meadow Fork
      - Barn Branch
  - Boone Fork the location of Kona
    - Little Creek
    - Yonts Fork
      - Quillen Fork the location of Hemphill
    - Wrights Fork the location of Fleming-Neon
      - Bottom Fork
      - She Fork
      - Chopping Branch
      - Tom Biggs Branch
      - Bark Camp Branch
    - Potter Fork
    - Wolf-pen Branch
  - Ritter Branch
  - Laurel Fork
  - Holbrook Branch
  - Fishpond Branch
  - Buck Branch

Three miles upstream from its confluence with the South Fork, it receives the Middle Fork. It joins the South Fork to form the Kentucky River at Beattyville.

=== Connections ===
A gap connects Whitaker Branch to a minor branch of Tolson Branch.

A trail leads from the Jakes Branch of Line Fork to the Stony Fork of Leatherwood Creek. A gap leads from Little Colly Creek to Camp Branch. Over a ridge from Daniels Branch in one direction is Little Carr Creek and in the other is the Trace Fork of Rockhouse Creek. Over a ridge from Sandlick Creek is the Camp Branch of Rockhouse Creek.

A road leads from the Little Sandlick Branch past Polly and over a gap to Sandlick Branch. A gap from Indian Creek leads to Millstone. A gap from Trace Fork of Smoot Creek leads to Little Colly Creek.

=== Mines ===
In 1916, Caudill Branch was the location of Nancy Caudill's and Ison Caudill's mines.

The Swift Coal and Timber Company had mines on Turkey Creek; Line Fork just downstream of Defeated Creek (on land owned by Mose Ison); Defeated Creek itself, and its Wilson Fork and Wolfpen Branch; and many other locations on Line Fork from Cornetts Branch all of the way to Line's headwaters including on Picture Branch, Shipley Fork, Long Branch, Coyle Branch, and Jakes Branch.

== See also ==
- List of rivers of Kentucky

== Sources ==
- Quinones, Ferdinand; Mull, Donald S.; York, Karen; Kendall, Victoria (August 1981). Hydrology of Area 14, Eastern Coal Province, Kentucky. Water Resources Investigations. Louisville, Kentucky: United States Geological Survey. doi:10.3133/ofr81137.
- Hodge, James Michael (1918). Coals of the North Fork of Kentucky River in Perry and Portions of Breathitt and Knott Counties. Reports of the Kentucky Geological Survey 4th series 1912–1918. Vol. 3. Frankfort, Kentucky: The State Journal Company. (Coals of the North Fork of Kentucky River in Perry and Portions of Breathitt and Knott Counties at the Internet Archive)
- Crider, Albert Foster (1916). The Coals of Letcher County. Reports of the Kentucky Geological Survey 4th series 1912–1918. Vol. 4. Frankfort, Kentucky: The State Journal Company. (The Coals of Letcher County at the Internet Archive)
- Rennick, Robert M. (2000). "Perry County — Post Offices". County Histories of Kentucky. No. 273. Morehead State University.
- Mull, D. S. (1965). Ground-Water Resources of the Jenkins-Whitesburg Area Kentucky (PDF). U.S. Geological Survey water-supply papers. Vol. 1809-A. United States Geological Survey.
- United States Federal Highway Administration (1994). US 119 Highway Transportation Project, Partridge to Whitesburg, Lechter County: Environmental Impact Statement. FHWA-KY-EIS-93-01-A.
- Smoot, James L.; Liebermann, Timothy D.; Evaldi, Ronald D.; White, Kevin D. (1995). Water-quality Assessment of the Kentucky River Basin, Kentucky: Analysis of Available Surface-water-quality Data Through 1986. U.S. Geological Survey water-supply papers. Vol. 2351. United States Geological Survey.
- United States Army Corps of Engineers, Louisville District (1958-06-30). Review of Reports on Kentucky River and Tributaries. Louisville, Kentucky: Secretary of the Army.
- Verhoeff, Mary (1917). The Kentucky River Navigation. Filson Club publications. Vol. 28. Louisville, Kentucky: John P. Morton. (The Kentucky River Navigation at the Internet Archive)
