= WJMD =

- Hazard, Kentucky; United States
- Frequency: 104.7 MHz
- Branding: "Where Jesus Makes the Difference"

Programming
- Format: Contemporary Christian
- Affiliations: ABC News Radio; Salem Communications

Ownership
- Owner: Hazard Broadcasting, Inc.

History
- Call sign meaning: Where Jesus Makes the Difference

Technical information
- Licensing authority: FCC
- Facility ID: 26496
- Class: A
- ERP: 480 watts
- HAAT: 346.0 meters
- Transmitter coordinates: 37°11′36.00″N 83°11′4.00″W

Links
- Public license information: Public file; LMS
- Webcast: Listen Live
- Website: WJMD Online

WJMD (104.7 FM) is a radio station broadcasting a Contemporary Christian format. It is licensed to Hazard, Kentucky, United States. The station is currently owned by Hazard Broadcasting, Inc. and features programming from ABC News Radio and Salem Communications.

== See also ==
- Campus radio
- List of college radio stations in the United States
