= Kentucky Geological Survey =

Research center in Kentucky

The Kentucky Geological Survey (KGS) is a research center of the University of Kentucky that provides information on the geology of Kentucky to researchers, industry professionals, governmental agencies, and the public. Since establishment in 1854, KGS has been a reporting agency for Kentucky lawmakers, an Immigration Bureau, a source of data for researchers, and is currently a research institute as part of the University of Kentucky. At one point, the official Kentucky State Geologist was prohibited by law from being associated with the University of Kentucky.

It is one of the United States's oldest geological organizations, pre-dating the United States Geological Survey by 25 years. It has worked with the USGS in several joint mapping programs, and because of one such program from 1949 to 1956 Kentucky became the first state of the United States to be fully topographically mapped at a scale of 1:24,000, which was then extended in a project run from 1960 to 1978 to have the whole of Kentucky geologically mapped at 1:24,000 scale, at a cost of US$21,000,000 (equivalent to $103,660,714 in 2025) and involving an estimated 660 person-years.

== Purpose ==
As Kentucky's premier organization for geological science, the KGS seeks to advance the Commonwealth and its citizens through timely, unbiased research that encompasses all aspects of the state's geological heritage and natural resource endowments. KGS centers its research and engagement around building resilience for the citizens that it serves, promoting discovery, innovation, and creativity in addressing problems and presenting opportunities in earth and environmental science.

== History ==
=== Preliminaries ===
Before the first Geological Survey of Kentucky was carried out, an initial reconnaissance was performed by Professor William Williams Mather in 1838, hired by Governor James Clark, after State Senator Wingate and State Representative J. T. Morehead had introduced resolutions in the Kentucky General Assembly on 1837-12-12 calling for a survey to be performed.

=== First Survey: Owen ===
The full, First Series, geological survey was established by law on March 4, 1854. It was only partly completed by David Dale Owen before he died. It comprised four volumes, 2012 pages, of topographic maps, and rock and soil analyses. There were also several plates with fossils.

=== Second Survey: Shaler and Procter ===
The Second survey was headed by a formal State Geologist, Governor Preston H. Leslie appointing N. S. Shaler from Harvard University for the task in 1873. It took 7 years to complete, with a team of geologists working under Shaler, and yielded a Second Series Part One of reports that came to six volumes, 2886 pages, with an ancillary set of memoirs. It had a budget of US$10,000 (equivalent to $268,750 in 2025), and one of Shaler's team was chemist Robert Peter who analysed soil composition throughout the state.

Shaler was, however, forced to resign as state geologist when the legislature decided that the office-holder had to be a resident of Kentucky, and he was replaced by John Robert Procter, his office assistant, who was not a geologist by training and who also had to double up as the director of the State Immigration Bureau. This resulted in the Second Series Part Two that came to eight volumes, 3020 pages, and a further 400 pages of "county surveys" in pamphlets.

A lot of this, at least 1336 pages worth, was a simple copy of the Shaler work. Procter simply had neither the time nor the expertise for the job, and the survey petered out when he left for Washington in 1893.

=== Third survey: Norwood ===
A 1904 law established a third survey, and directly appointed the head of the Geological Museum, professor Charles J. Norwood, as its director. Norwood and the geologists working for him produced 2761 pages in nineteen volumes, two county reports, and four progress reports.

=== Fourth survey: Hoeing ===
A 1912-03-07 law established a fourth survey, which reestablished an office of State Geologist once more, abolishing the joint office of Director of the survey and curator of the Geological Museum that Norwood had held. The law also required that the State Geologist not have any concurrent academic position, such as Norwood had had at the University of Kentucky, requiring it to be a full-time position.

The State Geologist was a gubernatorial appointment again, and that year James B. McCreary appointed Joseph B. Hoeing to the office, who had worked for all three of Shaler, Procter, and Norwood as cartographer and assistant geologist and who had also been State Forester. The Fourth Series of reports was 4280 pages in five volumes and four miscellaneous reports, with an accompanying series of maps at the county, region, and state levels.

=== Fifth Survey: Barton ===
Hoeing resigned when in 1918 the legislature abolished the State Geologist office and the Geological Survey, replacing it with a Deputy level office under the Commissioner of Geology and Forestry, abolishing the State Forester office at the same time. Forester John Earle Barton was appointed to this new Deputy Commissioner post on 1918-07-01.

Although there had been economic forces behind prior surveys, the Fifth Series of reports was especially strongly motivated by Kentucky's 1917 oil boom, and professor Willard R. Jillson of the University of Kentucky became an assistant geologist under Barton in 1918 to provide oil and gas surveys in particular. At Barton's recommendation, A. O. Stanley appointed Jillson as Barton's replacement on 1919-02-01. The Fifth Series was 1567 pages comprising four bulletins, and several mineral resource report pamphlets.

=== Sixth Survey: Jillson ===
As the doubled-up responsibilities of Procter had done before, the combination of Forestry and Geology under a single Commissioner led to time and budget conflicts between the two, and in response in 1920 the legislature set up a separate State Geologist post again, abolishing the joint Geology and Forestry department, to which Edwin P. Morrow appointed Jillson on 1920-04-01.

The Sixth survey produced a Sixth Series of reports, in twenty-five volumes, with roughly fifty minor additional articles, alongside thirty detailed county maps of coal and natural gas fields, as well as state-wide geological maps, maps of other mineral resources in Wester Kentucky. Jillson himself was a prolific writer on the subject of geology, and he had a policy of hiring geologists for fieldwork during the summer, rather than for permanent year-round work that might conflict with other commitments.

To fund all of this work, the state of Kentucky allocated US$50,000 (equivalent to $909,305 in 2025) in 1926, which was matched dollar-for-dollar by the United States Geological Survey. By 1927 it was estimated that the State Geologist had published 8500 pages in 147 titles.

=== Seventh Survey: McFarlan ===
In 1932, the Kentucky Geological Survey was transferred to the University of Kentucky and renamed the Bureau of Mineral and Topographic Survey. Arthur C. McFarlan was appointed State Geologist and Director of the Bureau. However, the Seventh Survey lasted barely two years and produced only six bulletins, totaling 51 pages, focused on the state's oil and gas resources. Assistant geologist Louise Barton Freeman was McFarlan's co-author on some of the bulletins.

=== Eighth Survey: Jones ===
In 1934, the Kentucky Geological Survey was reorganized as a subdivision—the Division of Geology—within the Kentucky Department of Mines and Minerals, and Daniel J. Jones was appointed Director and State Geologist. During Jones's tenure from 1934 to 1948, the Survey produced numerous bulletins, reports, reprints, and other publications, focusing primarily on the geology of oil and gas in the state.

=== Ninth Survey: Jones and McFarlan ===
In 1948, the Kentucky Geological Survey was once again transferred to the University of Kentucky and established as a research bureau within the Department of Geology under the act of the Kentucky General Assembly (KRS 151). Daniel J. Jones remained State Geologist, and Arthur C. McFarlan was appointed Director of the Bureau. From 1948 to 1958, the Ninth Survey produced 22 bulletins, 15 reports of investigation, 8 information circulars, 11 special reports, and 19 reprints covering Kentucky's geology, coal, oil and gas, groundwater, and other natural resources.

=== Tenth Survey: Hagan ===
In 1958, the Kentucky Geological Survey was formally established as a research center (bureau) within the University of Kentucky by the General Assembly through an amendment to KRS 151.010. Wallace W. Hagan was appointed Director and State Geologist, a position he held until his retirement in 1978. The Tenth Survey played a pioneering role in comprehensive state geological mapping. Through a landmark joint program with the U.S. Geological Survey from 1959 to 1978, Kentucky became the first state in the nation to be fully mapped geologically at a 1:24,000 scale. This ambitious program involved approximately 660 person-years of work and produced 707 maps, creating a foundational body of geological knowledge that continues to benefit the Commonwealth and its citizens.

=== Eleventh Survey: Haney ===
The Eleventh Kentucky Geological Survey began in 1978 with the appointment of Dr. Donald C. Haney as Director and State Geologist. Under Dr. Haney's leadership, KGS made significant advancements in coal assessment, groundwater research, mine subsidence programs, earthquake monitoring, and the development of computer databases to serve the public. Dr. Haney was a principal author of the National Geologic Mapping Act, passed by the 102nd Congress in 1992, which supported KGS's efforts to convert paper geologic maps into digital formats using GIS. He also championed state legislation establishing the Kentucky Groundwater Data Repository (KRS 151.035), the Kentucky Groundwater Monitoring Network (KRS 151.625), the Kentucky Oil and Gas Data Repository (KRS 353.550), and the Kentucky Seismic and Strong-Motion Network. During his tenure, Dr. Haney collaborated with the Kentucky General Assembly, the University of Kentucky, industry partners, and public officials to construct the Mining and Mineral Resources Building on the UK campus and the Kentucky Well Sample and Core Library (now the Earth Analysis Research Library) on Iron Works Pike. From 1978 to 1999, KGS was transformed into a modern research center with updated office facilities and state-of-the-art online data and information services accessible to all citizens of the Commonwealth.

=== Twelfth Survey: Cobb ===
The Twelfth Kentucky Geological Survey began in 1999 with the appointment of Dr. James C. Cobb as Director and State Geologist. Under Dr. Cobb's leadership, KGS modernized the delivery of geologic information, completed the computerization of geologic maps, and conducted research on natural resources, caves and karst systems, groundwater, and geologic hazards. The Survey completed all 30 × 60-minute geologic maps—a national milestone in geologic mapping—and produced digital maps and GIS products that expanded access to geologic information for Kentucky, setting a standard unmatched by other states. In 2007, KGS received $5 million from the General Assembly and $8.9 million from federal and industry partners to support a research project on carbon sequestration in Kentucky, which was completed in 2012.

=== Thirteenth Survey: Haneberg ===
The 13th Survey began with the appointment of Dr. William C. Haneberg as Director and State Geologist in 2016. The 13th Survey strengthened collaborations in radon, public health, and climate resilience; expanded geologic hazards programs; and supported an ambitious reorganization and modernization of the Earth Analysis Research Library (EARL), formerly the Well Sample and Core Library.

=== Fourteenth Survey: McGlue ===
The current 14th Survey began on August 1, 2024, with the appointment of Dr. Michael McGlue as Director and State Geologist for Kentucky.

== Sources ==
- Robinson, L. C. (January 1927). "The Kentucky Geological Survey". Register of the Kentucky State Historical Society. 25 (73): 86–93. JSTOR 23370088.
- Smath, Margaret Luther (2014). "Kentucky Geological Survey". In Kleber, John E. (ed.). The Kentucky Encyclopaedia. University Press of Kentucky. pp. 501–502. ISBN 9780813159010.
