= WZQQ (FM) =

Radio station in Hyden, Kentucky

- Hyden, Kentucky; United States
- Broadcast area: Hazard, Kentucky
- Frequency: 97.9 MHz
- Branding: Rock 97.9

Programming
- Format: Classic rock
- Affiliations: ABC News Radio

Ownership
- Owner: Mountain Broadcasting, Inc.

History
- First air date: November 7, 1988
- Former call signs: WZQQ (1988–1993); WRNG (1993); WZQQ (1993–2009); WKIC (2009–2019)

Technical information
- Licensing authority: FCC
- Facility ID: 37110
- Class: C3
- ERP: 2,000 watts
- HAAT: 346 meters
- Transmitter coordinates: 37°11′36″N 83°11′04″W

Links
- Public license information: Public file; LMS
- Webcast: Listen Live
- Website: wsgs.com

WZQQ (97.9 MHz) is an FM radio station operated by Leslie County Broadcasting with studios on Main Street in Hazard, Kentucky. It airs a classic rock music format.

The station has been assigned these call letters by the Federal Communications Commission since February 12, 2019.
