= WKIC (AM) =

Radio station in Hazard, Kentucky

- Hazard, Kentucky; United States
- Frequency: 1390 kHz
- Branding: WKIC 96.9

Programming
- Format: Top 40/CHR
- Affiliations: ABC News Radio

Ownership
- Owner: Mountain Broadcasting Service, Inc.
- Sister stations: WSGS

History
- First air date: November 23, 1947 (as WKIC)
- Former call signs: WKIC (1947–2009); WZQQ (2009–2019)

Technical information
- Licensing authority: FCC
- Facility ID: 43981
- Class: D
- Power: 5,000 watts day
- Transmitter coordinates: 37°14′21.00″N 83°12′39.00″W
- Translator: 96.9 W245CP (Hazard)

Links
- Public license information: Public file; LMS
- Webcast: Listen Live
- Website: wsgs.com

WKIC (1390 AM) is a radio station in Hazard, Kentucky. The station was known as WKIC for over sixty years, before assuming the call sign WZQQ when the WKIC call sign was moved to the FM dial at 97.9. The station is currently owned by Mountain Broadcasting Service, Inc. and features programming from ABC News Radio.

The station reassumed the WKIC call sign on February 12, 2019.
