= Hazard, Kentucky =

- City
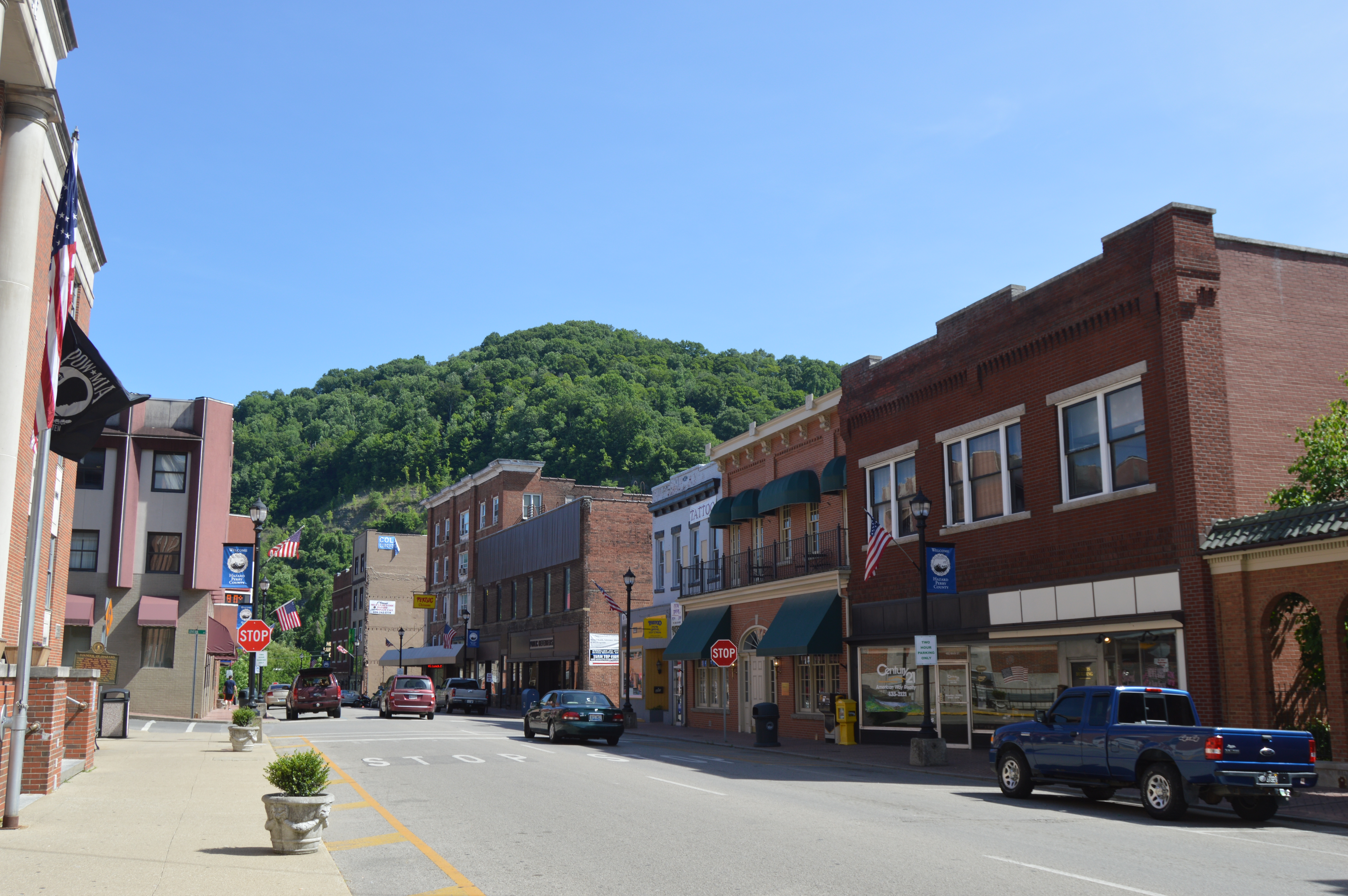
- Main Street in Hazard

- Flag Seal
- Motto: Queen City of the Mountains
- Location of Hazard in Perry County, Kentucky
- Coordinates: 37°14′55″N 083°11′42″W
- Country: United States
- State: Kentucky
- County: Perry
- Incorporated: April 30, 1884
- Named for: Cdre. Oliver Hazard Perry

Government
  - Mayor: Donald "Happy" Mobelini
  - City Manager: Derrick Hall
  - Assistant City Manager: Amie Bedwell
  - City Treasurer / Secretary to the Mayor

Area
  - Total: 7.60 sq mi (19.68 km^{2})
  - Land: 7.45 sq mi (19.30 km^{2})
  - Water: 0.15 sq mi (0.38 km^{2}) 0%
- Elevation: 928 ft (283 m)

Population (2020)
  - Total: 5,263
  - Estimate (2024): 4,808
  - Density: 706.4/sq mi (272.76/km^{2})
- Time zone: UTC−5 (EST)
  - Summer (DST): UTC−4 (EDT)
- ZIP Codes: 41701–41702
- Area code: 606
- FIPS code: 21-35362
- GNIS feature ID: 0512617
- Website: www.hazardky.gov

Hazard is a home rule-class city in, and the county seat of, Perry County, Kentucky, United States. The population was 5,263 at the 2020 census.

== History ==
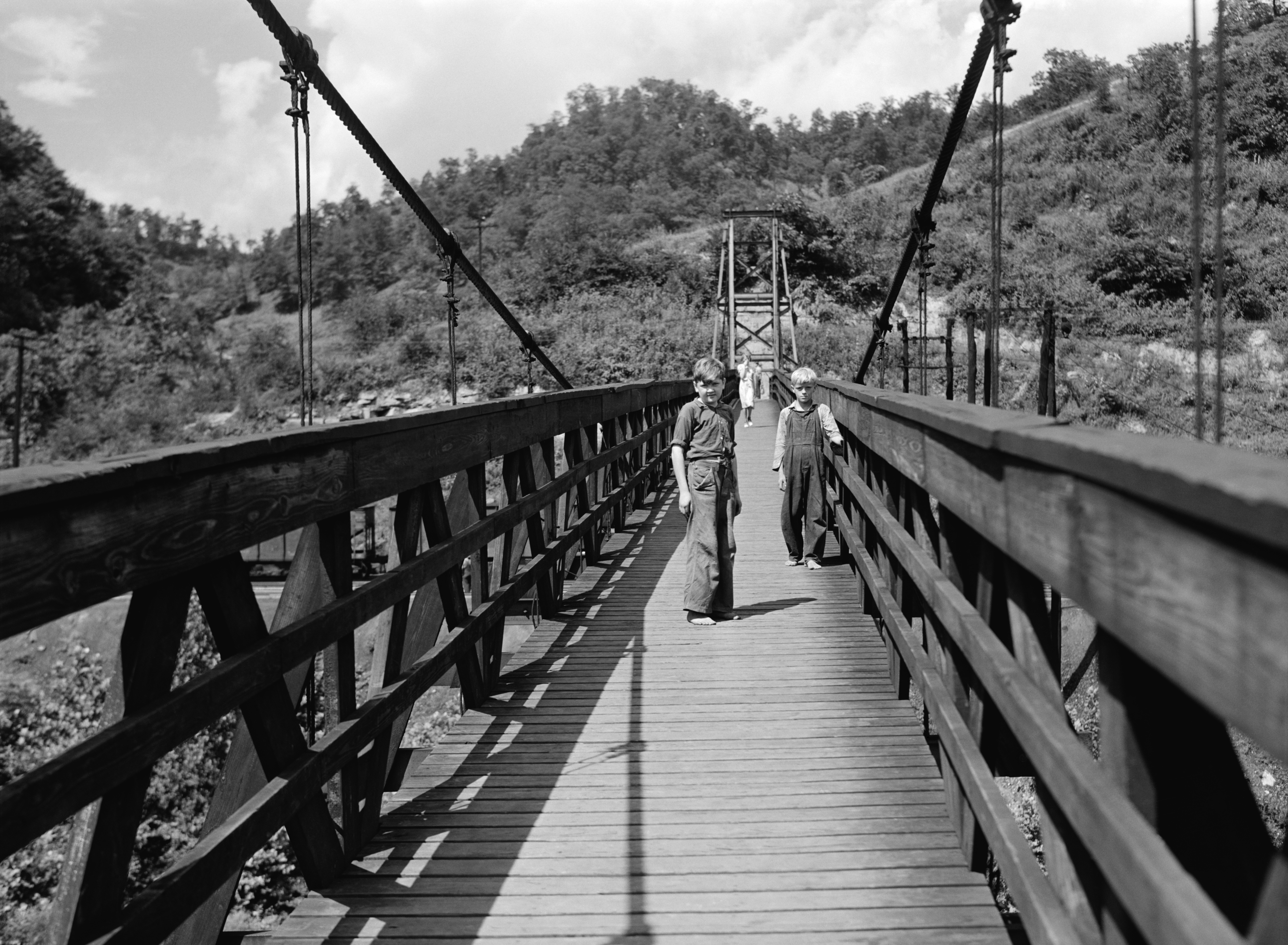
Coal miners' children cross a footbridge into Hazard, Kentucky, July 1940. Photograph by Marion Post Wolcott.

Local landowner Elijah Combs Sr. laid out the town in 1824 as the planned seat of the newly established Perry County. Both the town and the county were named for Cdre. Oliver Hazard Perry, a commander in the 1813 Battle of Lake Erie in the War of 1812. The post office was initially known as Perry Court House but the name was officially changed to Hazard in 1854. The city was formally incorporated by the state assembly in 1884.

Long isolated by the surrounding mountains, Hazard was opened to the outside world by the arrival of the railroad in 1912. The only access to the valley had previously been 45 miles down the North Fork of the Kentucky River or a two-week trip over the surrounding mountains. The railroad brought prosperity to the town, which ended up on the start of the Great Depression.

The song "High Sheriff of Hazard" was written by Tom Paxton in reference to a coal miner's strike in 1964.

Although the television series The Dukes of Hazzard was set in Georgia, cast members made appearances in the community. In 1981, Catherine Bach, James Best, Sorrell Booke and Rick Hurst, visited Hazard during its Black Gold Festival. In January 1982, series' star Tom Wopat delivered a $25,000 check from Warner Communications to the families of eight miners killed in a December 1981 explosion.

After several decades of population decline, the city saw a rapid increase of new residents as the growth rate approached 20% between 2010 and 2020. In July 1999, Hazard was the first stop on President Bill Clinton's tour of poverty-stricken communities that had failed to share in the boom of the 1990s. Hillary Clinton visited Hazard on November 2, 2008, at a political rally for Democratic U.S. Senate candidate Bruce Lunsford.

In July, 2022, the city was affected by the 2022 Appalachian floods upwards of 14-16" of rain falling during a 5-day period. Entire communities were swept away by flood waters, leading to over 600 helicopter rescues and countless swift water rescues by boat, and 45 deaths, 7 from Perry County. The storm "totally annihilated" Perry County's infrastructure, Sheriff Joe Engle told CNN. "Water, telephone, internet, electricity, all the basic roads, all the basic things you would build a community around have just disappeared," he said.

The Red Cross estimated that nearly 2,300 houses were damaged beyond repair, but determined almost 80% of those lost were not in the flood plain. FEMA reported that only 4% of those applying for housing recovery assistance had flood insurance.

== Geography ==
Hazard is located at 37°15′21″N 83°11′37″W (37.255910, −83.193706).

According to the United States Census Bureau, the city has a total area of 7.0 square miles (18 km^{2}), all land.

== Climate ==
The climate in this area is characterized by hot, humid summers and generally mild to cool winters. According to the Köppen Climate Classification system, Hazard has a humid subtropical climate, abbreviated "Cfa" on climate maps.

== Demographics ==
Historical population
Census	Pop.	Note	%±
1880	76		—
1910	587		—
1920	4,348		640.7%
1930	7,021		61.5%
1940	7,397		5.4%
1950	6,985		−5.6%
1960	5,958		−14.7%
1970	5,459		−8.4%
1980	5,371		−1.6%
1990	5,416		0.8%
2000	4,806		−11.3%
2010	4,456		−7.3%
2020	5,263		18.1%
2024 (est.)	4,808		−8.6%
U.S. Decennial Census

=== 2020 census ===
As of the 2020 census, Hazard had a population of 5,263. The median age was 41.7 years. 20.1% of residents were under the age of 18 and 18.7% of residents were 65 years of age or older. For every 100 females, there were 95.1 males, and for every 100 females age 18 and over, there were 95.8 males age 18 and over.

96.5% of residents lived in urban areas, while 3.5% lived in rural areas.

There were 2,072 households, of which 28.5% had children under the age of 18 living in them. Of all households, 33.7% were married-couple households, 21.6% were households with a male householder and no spouse or partner present, and 36.7% were households with a female householder and no spouse or partner present. About 34.7% of all households were made up of individuals, and 12.4% had someone living alone who was 65 years of age or older.

There were 2,434 housing units, of which 14.9% were vacant. The homeowner vacancy rate was 3.3%, and the rental vacancy rate was 11.0%.

Racial composition as of the 2020 census
Race	Number	Percent
White	4,608	87.6%
Black or African American	210	4.0%
American Indian and Alaska Native	11	0.2%
Asian	143	2.7%
Native Hawaiian and Other Pacific Islander	0	0.0%
Some other race	48	0.9%
Two or more races	243	4.6%
Hispanic or Latino (of any race)	61	1.2%

=== Demographic estimates ===
As of the census of 2021, the population density was 692.5 inhabitants per square mile (267.4/km^{2}).

=== 2000 census ===
In 2000, there were 1,946 households, out of which 30.2% had children under the age of 18 living with them, 42.9% were married couples living together, 18.3% had a female householder with no husband present, and 34.9% were non-families. Of all households, 31.7% were made up of individuals, and 13.7% had someone living alone who was 65 years of age or older. The average household size was 2.30 and the average family size was 2.88.

In the city, the population was spread out, with 21.9% under the age of 18, 8.5% from 18 to 24, 28.0% from 25 to 44, 23.9% from 45 to 64, and 17.7% who were 65 years of age or older. The median age was 39 years. For every 100 females, there were 85.6 males. For every 100 females age 18 and over, there were 82.3 males.

The median income for a household in the city was $20,690, and the median income for a family was $27,226. Males had a median income of $34,398 versus $22,386 for females. The per capita income for the city was $14,782. About 30.9% of families and 30.5% of the population were below the poverty line, including 44.3% of those under age 18 and 13.9% of those age 65 or over.

== Education ==
- Galen College of Nursing
- Hazard Community and Technical College
- Hazard Independent Schools – a school district that serves the city; operates one elementary school, one middle school, and one high school
  - Hazard High School
- Perry County Schools – operates six elementary schools, one K–12 school, one high school, and one alternative school
- Hazard Christian Academy

Hazard has a lending library, the Perry County Public Library.

== Media ==
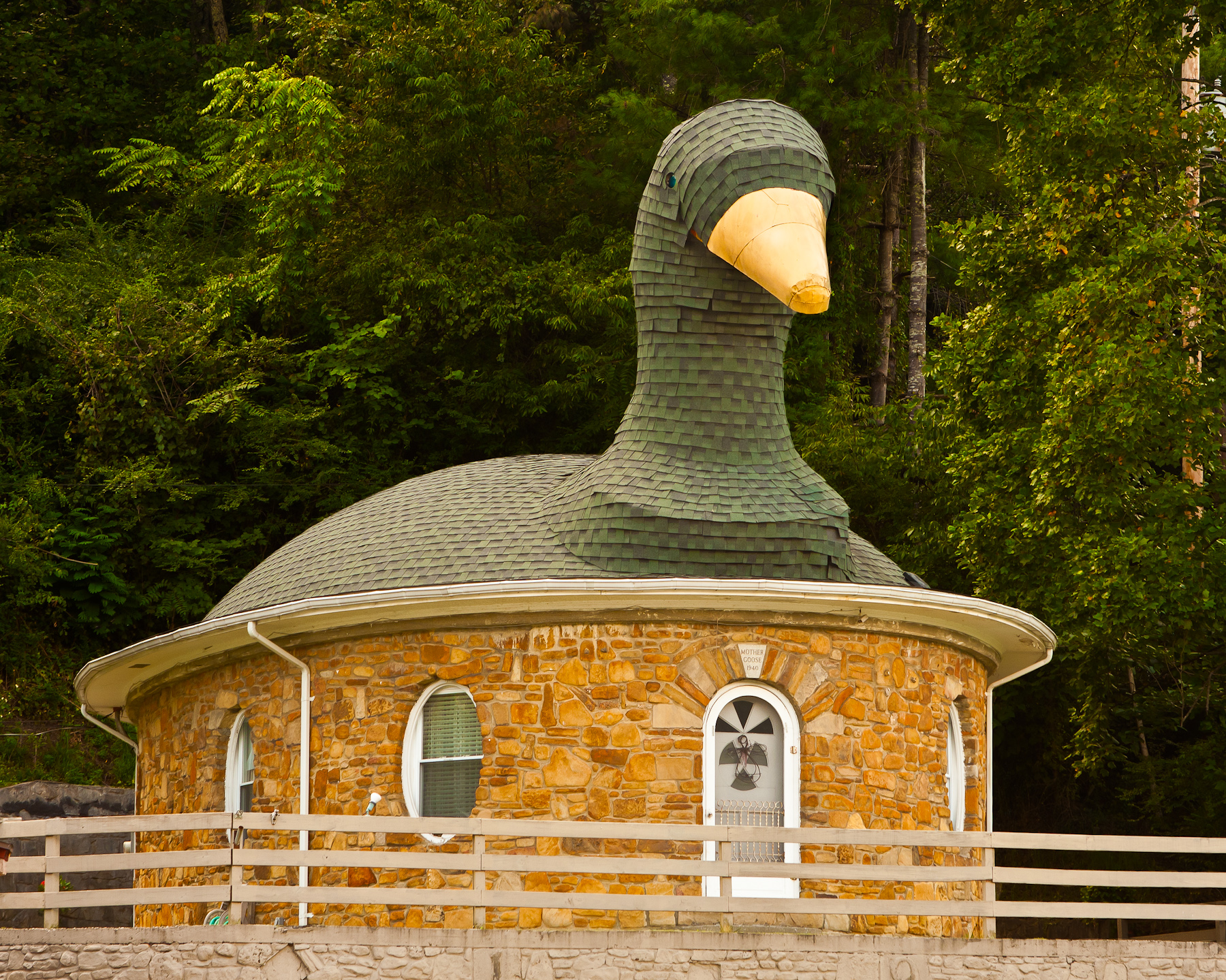
The Mother Goose House in Hazard, Kentucky

=== Television ===
- WYMT-TV, a semi-satellite of CBS affiliate WKYT-TV in Lexington
- WKHA, a satellite station of Kentucky Educational Television

=== Radio ===
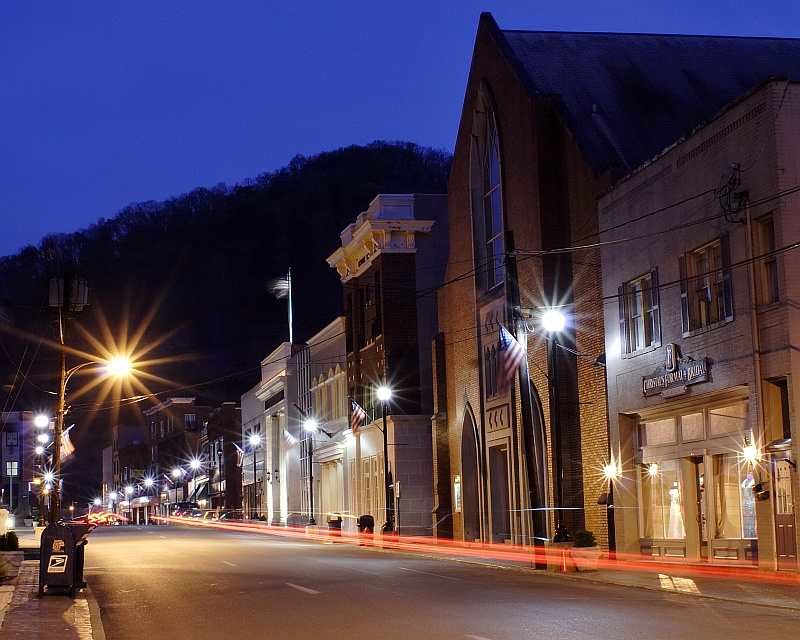
Main Street

- WSGS
- WKIC
- WZQQ
- WJMD
- WEKH, a satellite station of WEKU
- WQXY
- WLZD-LP

=== Newspapers ===
- Hazard Herald
- Perry County Advocate

== Notable people ==
- Red Allen, Bluegrass singer
- Baddiewinkle, Internet personality
- Martin Fugate, patriarch of "Blue Fugates", a family with a genetic trait that led to the blood disorder methemoglobinemia
- J. Dudley Goodlette, politician and lawyer
- Louann Brizendine, neuropsychiatrist, clinician, researcher, and professor
- Joe Craft, businessman and philanthropist
- Rebecca Gayheart, actress
- Daniel Mongiardo, physician, state senator, and Lieutenant Governor of Kentucky
- Brandon Smith, businessman, state representative and senator
- Sam Smith, basketball player, one of the first three African American basketball players at the University of Louisville
- Mary Lou Turner, country music singer
