= National Register of Historic Places listings in Breathitt County, Kentucky =

Location of Breathitt County in Kentucky

This is a list of the National Register of Historic Places listings in Breathitt County, Kentucky.

It is intended to be a complete list of the properties on the National Register of Historic Places in Breathitt County, Kentucky, United States. The locations of National Register properties for which the latitude and longitude coordinates are included below, may be seen in a map.

There are 7 properties listed on the National Register in the county. Another property was once listed but has been removed.

This National Park Service list is complete through NPS recent listings posted March 21, 2025.

== Current listings ==
	Name on the Register	Image	Date listed	Location	City or town	Description
1	Breathitt County Jail	Breathitt County Jail	February 21, 1986 (#86000271)	1027 College St. 37°33′11″N 83°23′03″W	Jackson	
2	Crain's Wholesale and Retail Store	Crain's Wholesale and Retail Store	February 21, 1986 (#86000272)	College and Broadway Sts. 37°33′08″N 83°23′05″W	Jackson	Two-story nine-bay brick commercial building built by 1914, with a pressed metal cornice and a George Mesker cast iron facade first floor. Building is missing.
3	Jackson Commercial District	Jackson Commercial District	February 21, 1986 (#86000284)	Main St. between Court west to Broadway St. 37°33′11″N 83°23′08″W	Jackson	
4	Jackson Post Office	Jackson Post Office	July 23, 1990 (#90001087)	359 Broadway Street; 37°33′13″N 83°23′12″W	Jackson	
5	M.E. Church, South	M.E. Church, South	February 21, 1986 (#86000280)	1022 College St. 37°33′11″N 83°23′01″W	Jackson	
6	Morris Fork Presbyterian Church and Community Center		November 15, 2010 (#10000908)	908 Morris Fork Rd. 37°22′54″N 83°31′02″W	Morris Fork	
7	Stacey Hotel	Stacey Hotel	February 21, 1986 (#86000282)	Broadway and College Sts. 37°33′09″N 83°23′04″W	Jackson	

== Former listing ==
	Name on the Register	Image	Date listed	Date removed	Location	City or town	Description
1	L & N Railroad Depot		February 21, 1986 (#86000279)	February 6, 1990	Armory Dr.	Jackson	

== See also ==
- List of National Historic Landmarks in Kentucky
- National Register of Historic Places listings in Kentucky
