= Robinson Forest =

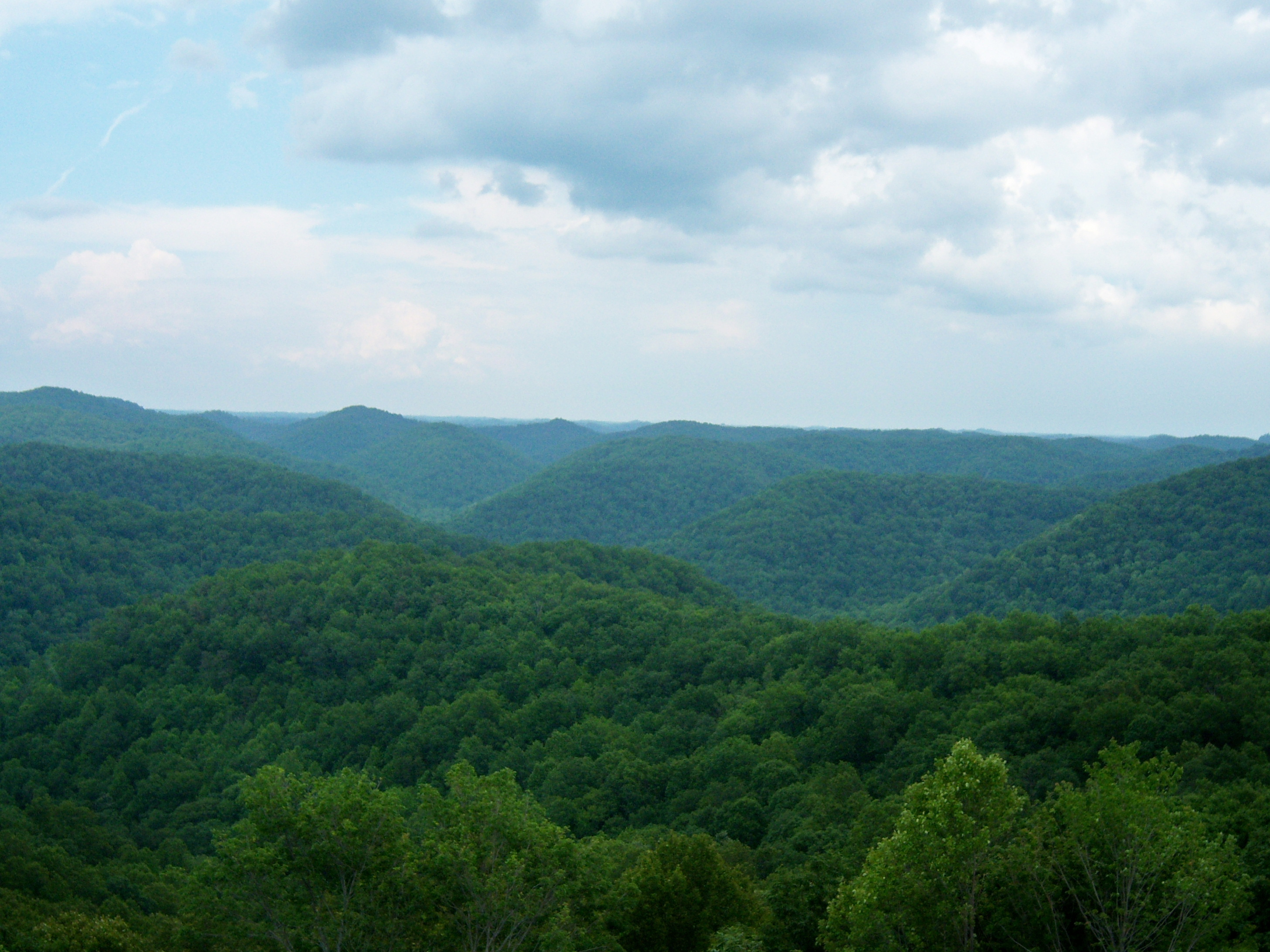
- Interactive map of Robinson Forest
- Location: Breathitt, Knott, and Perry counties, Kentucky
- Nearest city: Jackson, Kentucky
- Coordinates: 37°28′23″N 83°08′36″W
- Area: 14,786 acres (59.84 km^{2})
- Established: 1923
- Governing body: University of Kentucky Department of Forestry

The Robinson Forest is a research, education, and extension forest owned by the University of Kentucky and managed by the Department of Forestry in the College of Agriculture, Food, and Environment. The forest covers 14,786 acres (59.84 km^{2}) in Breathitt, Knott and Perry counties in Kentucky's Cumberland Plateau region. The main block of Robinson Forest contains approximately 10,000 contiguous acres while the remaining acreage is found in outlying tracts.

== History ==
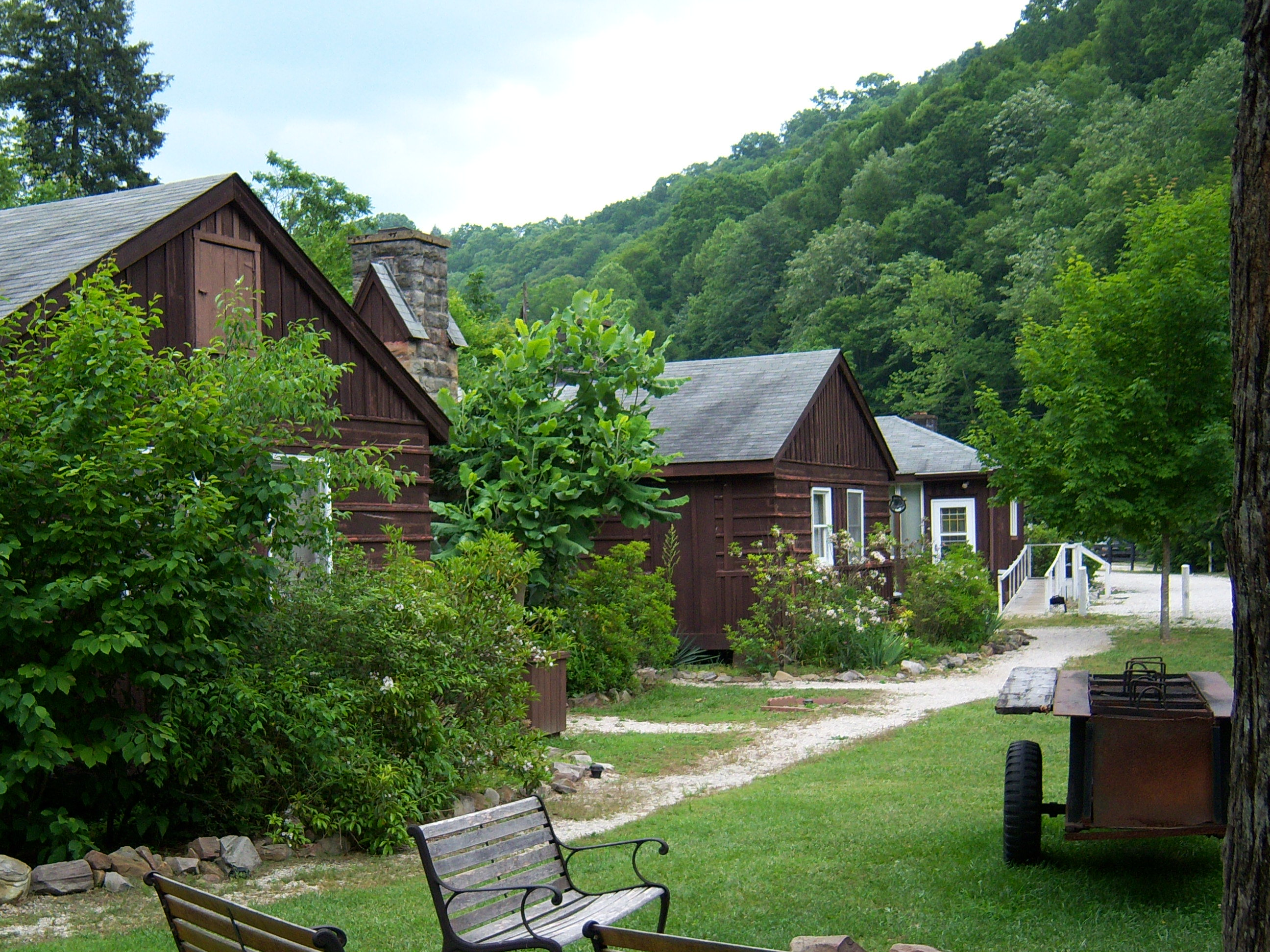
Cabins constructed from salvaged American chestnut trees killed by the chestnut blight.

In 1908, E.O Robinson and Fredrick W. Mowbray of the Mowbray-Robinson Lumber Company based out of Cincinnati, Ohio purchased nearly 15,000 acres (61 km^{2}) of land in Perry, Knott and Breathitt counties in Kentucky. They bought most of that land from Miles Back (1853–1940). By 1914 a narrow gauge railroad was constructed, connecting the once isolated region to the sawmills in West Irvine and Quicksand, thereby providing access to the Louisville and Nashville Railroad.

However, by 1922 the majority of the timber had been extracted and E.O. Robinson decided to donate the land to the University of Kentucky. Robinson's main intention for donating the land was for the establishment of an agricultural research facility for the purpose of agricultural experimental work and teaching, and for the practical demonstration of reforestation. As a way to transfer the tract, he set up the E.O. Robinson Mountain Fund in 1923. This fund not only promoted land management but also called for the general improvement of welfare and education in the residents of Eastern Kentucky. By 1925, workers from the university moved to the forest and work began on removing the former structures and forest regeneration began in certain areas. The first forester, C.H. Burrage, spent several years mapping property boundaries and organizing fire protection.

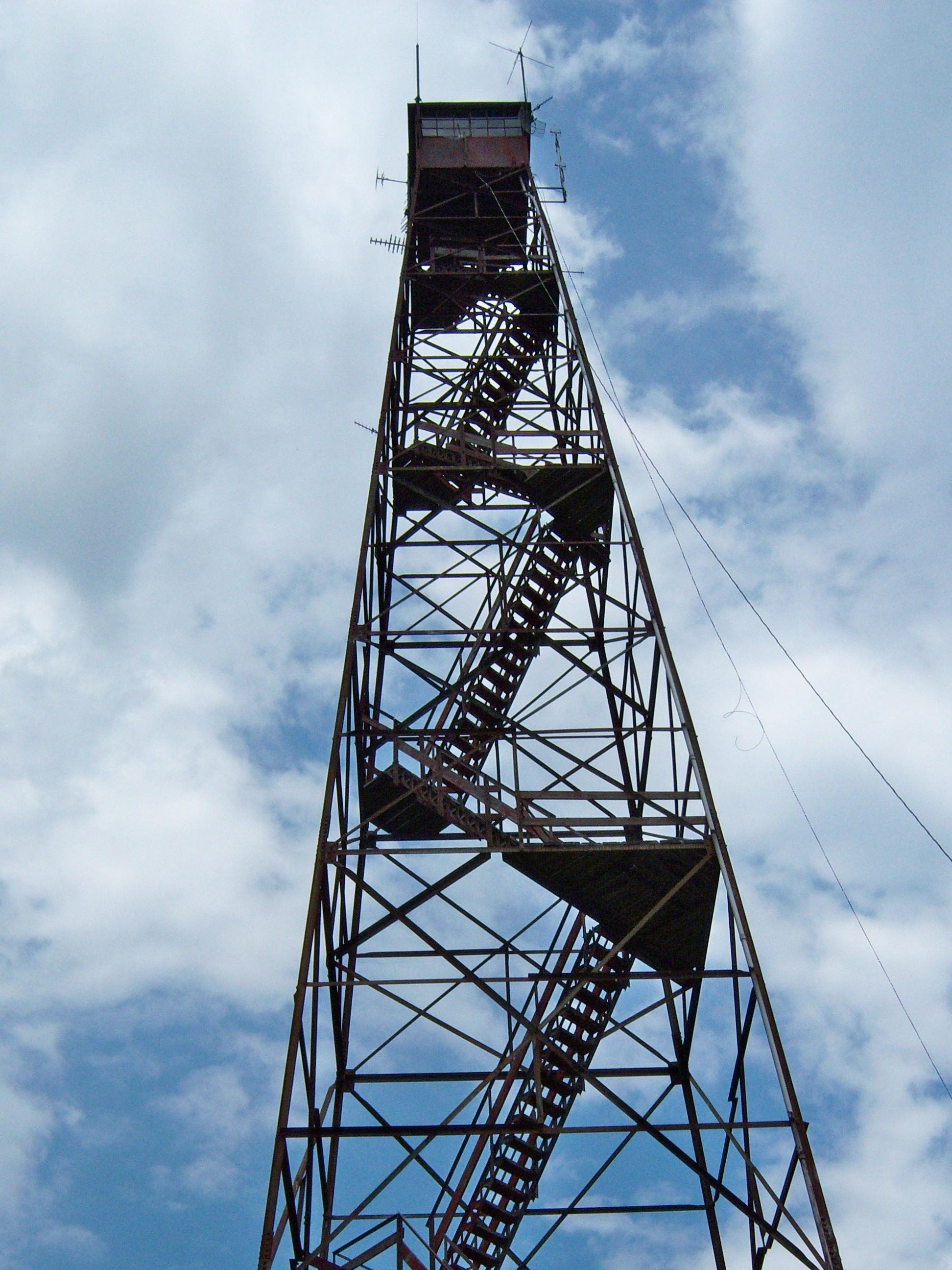
Robinson Forest Fire Tower

From 1933 to 1937, the Civilian Conservation Corps was involved in many projects within the forest including: building bridges, fire towers, and fire breaks; installing telephone lines; establishing tree plantations; doing timber stand improvements; and improving roads. They also removed American chestnuts that had been killed by the chestnut blight. These logs were then used in 1939 by the National Youth Authority to build the cabins and other facilities on present-day Boardinghouse Branch. In 1947, the forest also became a wildlife restoration area. White-tailed deer, wild turkey, and ruffed grouse were successfully stocked.

In 1970, the University of Kentucky's Department of Forestry was established, creating new interest in forestry and water quality. Since that time management of the forest has been performed by the department operating under guidelines approved by the University of Kentucky's Board of Trustees. Today, Robinson Forest serves as one of the largest educational forests east of the Mississippi River.

== See also ==
- Bernheim Arboretum and Research Forest
- Berea College Forest
- Duke Forest
- Clemson Experimental Forest
- West Virginia University Research Forest
