= Kentucky Route 315 =

Rural highway in the state of Kentucky, USA

Kentucky Route 315
- KY 315 highlighted in red

Route information
- Maintained by KYTC
- Length: 11.5 mi (18.5 km)

Major junctions
- South end: KY 28 near Morris Fork
- KY 1933 near Talbert
- North end: KY 30 near Turkey

Location
- Country: United States
- State: Kentucky
- Counties: Breathitt

Highway system
- Kentucky State Highway System; Interstate; US; State; Parkways
← KY 314	→ KY 316

Kentucky Route 315 (KY 315) is a 11.5-mile-long (18.5 km) state highway in the U.S. state of Kentucky. The highway travels through mostly rural areas of Breathitt County.

== Route description ==
KY 315 begins at an intersection with KY 28 east-northwest of Morris Fork, within Breathitt County. It travels to the east-northeast, paralleling Freeman Fork, and curves to the south-southeast. It then curves back to the north-northeast and begins paralleling the Middle Fork Kentucky River, which it follows for the rest of its length. The highway curves to the east-southeast and then to the west-northwest. It then curves back to the north-northeast and passes Herald Cemetery before it intersects the western terminus of KY 1933. It curves to the west-southwest and crosses over Elsome Creek. KY 315 curves to the north-northeast and travels through Sebastians Branch. It has an eastern curve to the northwest. It curves to the north-northeast and passes Combs Cemetery before it curves to the north-northwest. The highway curves to the north-northeast and back to the north-northwest before meeting its northern terminus, an intersection with KY 30.

== Major intersections ==
The entire route is in Breathitt County.

Location	mi	km	Destinations	Notes
	0.0	0.0	KY 28	Southern terminus
	4.6	7.4	KY 1933 west	Eastern terminus of KY 1933
	11.5	18.5	KY 30	Northern terminus
1.000 mi = 1.609 km; 1.000 km = 0.621 mi
