= WMTC (AM) =

- Vancleve, Kentucky; United States
- Frequency: 730 kHz

Programming
- Format: Defunct (formerly Southern Gospel / Christian talk)
- Affiliations: Salem Communications

Ownership
- Owner: Kentucky Mountain Holiness Association
- Sister stations: WMTC-FM

History
- First air date: June 1948
- Call sign meaning: Winning Men To Christ

Technical information
- Facility ID: 65757
- Class: D
- Power: 5,000 watts day 50 watts night
- Transmitter coordinates: 37°36′12.00″N 83°26′39.00″W

Links
- Website: mountaingospel.org

WMTC (730 AM) was a radio station broadcasting a Christian format. Formerly licensed to Vancleve, Kentucky, United States, the station was owned by the Kentucky Mountain Holiness Association for its entire existence. WMTC's format consisted of Southern Gospel music, as well as Christian talk and teaching programs such as; Revive our Hearts with Nancy Leigh DeMoss, Joni & Friends, Focus on the Family, and Unshackled!, as well as children's programming such as Adventures in Odyssey.

WMTC went off the air on February 20, 2013. The station's license was surrendered to the Federal Communications Commission (FCC) by the licensee on March 7, 2013, and the FCC cancelled WMTC's license on March 12, 2013.
