= WMTC =

WMTC can refer to:

- WMTC-FM, a radio station (99.9 FM) licensed to serve Vancleve, Kentucky, United States
- WMTC (AM), a defunct radio station (730 AM) formerly licensed to serve Vancleve, Kentucky
- World Motorcycle Test Cycle or WMTC - an initiative stipulating test methods for measuring the fuel consumption of motorcycles
