= Breathitt County High School =

Coordinates: 37.55477°N 83.38432°W

Breathitt High School
- 2307 Bobcat Lane; Jackson, Kentucky 41339; United States

Information
- Type: Public
- Established: 1927 in Quicksand, Kentucky, Moved in 1938 to Jackson, Kentucky Current building - est. 1982
- School district: Breathitt County Schools (State Management)
- Principal: Daphne Noble
- Teaching staff: 43.36 (on FTE basis)
- Grades: 7 to 12
- Enrollment: 731 (2023–2024)
- Student to teacher ratio: 16.86
- Colors: Royal blue and white
- Sports: Football, volleyball, girls' soccer, boys' basketball, girls' basketball, boys' cross country, girls' cross country, boys' track and field, girls' track and field, boys' golf, girls' golf, cheerleading, baseball, and fast pitch softball
- Mascot: Bobcat
- Team name: Bobcats/Ladycats (aka Lady Bobcats)
- Feeder schools: Breathitt Middle School
- Website: https://bhs.breathitt.k12.ky.us/

Breathitt County High School (aka Breathitt High School) is a public high school located in the city of Jackson, Kentucky nestled in the Appalachian Mountains of Eastern Kentucky. The 2023 enrollment is 519 students. The school colors are royal blue and white. The current principal is Daphne Noble. With about 70 certified staff, Breathitt County High offers a wide range of courses leading to two separate diploma tracks. Students can receive a college preparation diploma or technical preparation diploma. Both meet the stringent standards set forth by the Kentucky Department of Education.

== History ==
=== Beginnings ===
The high school was established in 1927 in Quicksand, Kentucky, just south of the county seat of Jackson. Kentucky. It came about when in the office of the superintendent of Breathitt County and the Jackson City School board of education disagreed on ways of education and how it should be run. It was during that time that the county school children went to the city school (which is an independent school) since it was the only public high school in the county. Soon, the idea of building a county high school was born.

In 1927, it was decided that the high school would be located in the growing logging town of Quicksand, 3 miles (4.8 km) southeast of Jackson. The county would use the Quicksand Common Grade School building that was donated to the county school system, in 1917, by E. O. Robinson, and F. W. Mowbray, the heads of the Mowbray and Robinson Company, a major logging company and the major employer for the boomtown. It would be known as Breathitt County High School, but many locals sometimes called it Quicksand High School (due to its location, since not many high schools then were known by the county name) or Breathitt High School (due to many reasons, but mainly because many high schools in the area back then only had three initials and not many schools existed as a unified county school with "county" in the name). It was used so often and was so common that when the second building was constructed, they carved over top of the entrance "Breathitt High School" instead of "Breathitt County High School". This is why the name "Breathitt High School" is still used by many locals today.

=== The first high school in Quicksand ===
The campus was located on a hill overlooking the town of Quicksand. It was set up much like a college campus, with a boys' and girls' dormitory. These were needed due to inefficient roads, lack of many motor vehicles, and the long travel it would take to go back and forth every day; most students walked to school. Most kids stayed for weekdays and went home on weekends. There were five buildings on campus:

- The main building housed the auditorium, the cafeteria, four classrooms, and the administrator's office.
- Boys' dormitory
- Girls' dormitory
- Gymnasium, located just behind the main building
- Vlassroom building

The first year of its existence, with 24 students and two faculty members, was headed by L. K. Rice as principal. Within its first year, it housed a boys' and girls' basketball team that competed in the KHSAA. There were two graduates for its first commencement: Roy Bach and Wayne Davis.

Enrollment and faculty continued to grow through the end of the decade and up into the 1930s, despite the effects of the Great Depression. They gained many more extracurricular activities and classes over the years like music, boys' and girls' glee club, and FFA.

=== The move to Jackson: the second high school ===
By the mid-1930s, the board of education knew the buildings were becoming inefficient to contain the rapid growth of the student body and faculty. In 1936, an 8-acre (32,000 m^{2}) property was bought on Court Street and next to the North Fork of the Kentucky River in Jackson. Building began immediately and the school was completed to be opened in September 1938. It was a two-story red brick building that had about 40 classrooms and a separate gymnasium with an auditorium that housed around 200 people. There was a huge field behind the school for sporting activities of recreation. The building was dedicated in January 1938 by First Lady Eleanor Roosevelt during her visit to the county. All this was due to the efforts from current Superintendent Marie Roberts-Turner and her fighting for better education to the children of Breathitt County. There were 46 graduates from the graduating class of the new high school (Class of 1939).

With a growing number of students due to the paving of many roads and bus transportation, more was added throughout the years. The high school added more buildings to its campus, including:

- Arts and Industrial Building - housed the art room, band room, chorus room, and the industrial arts
- Library Building - a two-story building that housed the library and study hall
- Little Red School - an elementary school (grades k-8) that was originally built for the purpose of giving high school students a chance to teach, but the enrollment soon grew and more buildings grew as well.
- Breathitt Coliseum - built in 1963 due to the overcrowding of the previous gymnasium. For two or three years prior, the high school used Lees College's Van Meter Gym for games. It housed, not only the gym, but the ROTC, classrooms, and a stage for use of theatre. In 2000, it would be renamed the Fairce O. Woods Coliseum. There is no air conditioning in that building, but it has oversized ceiling fans.
- Football field - built in 1977, a year after the first football team was organized at Breathitt County H.S.
- Baseball field - built around the 1960s. It would, eventually be flipped around due to the use of the field for football and the new football stadium. In 2006, a new baseball and softball complex was built behind LBJ Elementary School.
- Carl D. Perkins Vocational Building - built around 1969 as a means to increase vocational education. A second building was built later. Both buildings are known as the Breathitt County Area Technology Center.
- Greenhouse
- Various small buildings

Soon, another entrance from Washington Avenue was built due to the oncoming of the new road.

=== Time takes its toll: the third high school ===
In the early 1980s, age was taking a toll on many campus buildings. Little Red Elementary had been consolidated with other schools to form L. B. J. Elementary and Sebastian Middle School, which housed 7th and 8th grades. It was decided to build a new high school. Many fought to keep the old brick high school. Moving the high school to another piece of property was considered, but in the end, it was more convenient to keep the high school where it was, due to the domed gymnasium, vocational school, and recently built football field.

In 1980, construction began on a building connected to the Fairce O. Woods Coliseum. The original brick high school was torn down in the middle of the academic year, which caused some classes to move to alternative locations. Students moved into the new building during the spring semester of 1982.

The new high school could house approximately 1,200 students. It had many modern classrooms and was two stories high. It contained:

- spacious classrooms
- new science labs
- a larger lunchroom with a full size kitchen
- conference room
- drafting room
- a new P.E. gymnasium that could be used as a practice facility and would eventually house volleyball. It contained a second floor for practices and expansion seating. It contained a stage for theater, and boys' and girls' shower facilities.
- shop class
- FFA (Agriculture) room
- Chorus room, which would later be turned into the CAD and technology room. Chorus would be moved to the band room.
- Band room
- home economics rooms
- two-level library
- front office and lobby

The new high school provided new things that many students had not seen before at the old high school. This included a modern P.A. system, digital clocks in the hallways (which would be replaced in 2000), and an elevator. This building is still in use today, with a few differences due to renovations and changes.

== Mascot, school colors, and school (fight) song ==
In the early days, Breathitt County High School's teams were known as the Owls. In the mid-1930s, just before the move to Jackson, this was changed to the Bobcats. It has been said that the current nickname of "Bobcats" was adopted due many basketball players buying Bobcat Candy at a nearby store after games. This seemed to have a more intimidating sound than "Owls", and became the official nickname.

Variants have been used for other sports, such as TrackCats or GolfCats. Baseball sometimes uses "BatCats", and volleyball uses "VolleyCats". Most clubs and sports just use "Bobcats" or "LadyCats".

The original school colors were purple and gold. Supposedly, they were "borrowed" from the neighboring high school and rival Jackson City School. These colors were only kept for a couple of years, and were changed to red, white, and blue. Around the early 1930s, the red was dropped and the primary colors were just royal blue and white. This was probably due to the rise of the University of Kentucky men's basketball program and Coach Adolph Rupp.

The school song, sometimes called the fight song, is based on the University of Notre Dame's school song, and has the same melody. It is not known who wrote lyrics, or what year they were written. They may have been written in the 1930s or 1940s, when basketball at the high school was rising in interest.

== Sports ==
Breathitt County High School is known for its athletic programs, currently under the heading of Kyle Moore, Breathitt County Schools' athletic director and head football coach.

Sports include boys' basketball, girls' basketball, football, baseball, fast-pitch softball, track and field, golf, volleyball, tennis, cross country, and cheerleading.

=== Football ===
In 1975, it was decided that the high school would field a football team due to the ongoing popularity in the region and the growing student body. At the time, there was a field and no stadium to play in. Most games were played during the day. Attendees stood or sat on buses or vehicles. The next year, it was agreed to build a stadium for fans to enjoy the game. Due to the construction, most games except two had to be played away. These home games were played at the local National Guard Amory.

Soon Breathitt County became a powerhouse in 3A, with their first undefeated season coming in 1978. In 1995, due to low student enrollment, they moved down to AA and became dominant in the class.

In football, the Bobcats won the KHSAA Class AA State Championships in 1995, 1996, and 2002. From 1995 to 1997 they boasted a winning streak of 42 games without a defeat. They went undefeated in 1995 and 1996. They had another undefeated season in 2002. In 2008, the Bobcats were KHSAA Class AAA runners-up.

The head coach is Kyle Moore.

The stadium is the Mike Holcomb Athletic Complex. This newer stadium replaced the old Breathitt Stadium built-in 1976. Constructed in 1998 and is one of few stadiums in the State of Kentucky to have a roof to cover spectators. According to KHSAA's website, it holds approximately 6,000 people. It has also been dubbed the nicknamed "The Riverbank" due to its location at the banks of the North Fork of the Kentucky River and the drainage of Panbowl Lake which once was part of the river.

=== Boys' basketball ===
The high school has had a boys' basketball team since its founding in 1927. They have won twelve regional championships and countless district championships. Many contribute to the golden years of the 1950s and 1960s with coach Fairce O. Woods. Due to his many years of success, he was elected to the KHSAA Hall of Fame. The Breathitt Coliseum, built in 1963, a circular domed arena, was renamed the Fairce O. Woods Coliseum in 2000.

=== Girls' basketball ===
The first girls' team started the same year as the school's founding, and lasted until the 1931–1932 season, when the KHSAA discontinued girls' basketball in high school. The prevailing thought at the time was that the game was too strenuous an activity for girls. In 1975, KHSAA revived girls' basketball. The school soon hired a coach and started a varsity team again.

The girls' team made it to the KHSAA Sweet Sixteen Finals in 1978, only to be runners-up to Laurel County High School. Irene (Moore) Strong was crowned Kentucky "Miss Basketball" that same year.

The Ladycats, in recent years, made a run of regional titles. They won the 14th Regional Tournament four times in a row up to 2010 (2006–07, 2007–08, 2008–09, 2009–10).

== Extracurriculars ==
Breathitt County High School has a variety of extracurricular activities available to students including several clubs. Future Farmers of America is the oldest club, founded the same year the school was opened in 1927.

Other extracurricular activities (non-sports) include:

- Academic Team
- HOSA
- Band - Marching Band, Pep Band, Concert Band
- JROTC
- Future Farmers of America
- Future Business Leaders of America
- Teens For Christ
- National Honor Society
- FCCLA
- Journalism
- Science Club
- STOP Club
- French Club
- Gifted and Talented

== Breathitt County Area Technology Center ==
Located on the Breathitt County High School campus, Breathitt County Area Technology Center is a vocational school where students can receive college credit and work in areas such as electricity, automotive technology, health services, construction, desktop publishing, and web design. Consisting of two buildings, the area technology center provides services to all local high schools, including Jackson High School, Riverside Christian High School, Oakdale Vocational High School and Mount Carmel High School.

== Notable alumni ==
- MiKyle McIntosh - basketball player, College Park SkyHawks
- Jeffrey Reddick - screenwriter, actor, film producer, creator of the Final Destination franchise
