= WBFC (AM) =

- Stanton, Kentucky; United States
- Frequency: 1470 kHz
- Branding: Mountain Gospel Radio

Programming
- Format: Southern gospel; Christian talk
- Affiliations: Salem Media Group; Moody Radio

Ownership
- Owner: Kentucky Mountain Bible College
- Sister stations: WMTC-FM

History
- First air date: June 21, 1975

Technical information
- Licensing authority: FCC
- Facility ID: 31074
- Class: D
- Power: 2,500 watts day 25 watts night
- Transmitter coordinates: 37°52′58″N 83°52′56″W
- Translator: (98.7 MHz) W254DH (Stanton)

Links
- Public license information: Public file; LMS
- Website: http://mountaingospel.org/

WBFC (1470 AM) is a Christian radio station licensed to Stanton, Kentucky, United States, playing a southern gospel format. The station is currently owned by Kentucky Mountain Bible College and features programming from Salem Media Group and Moody Radio.
