= MiKyle McIntosh =

Canadian basketball player (born 1994)

No. 21 – Panteras de Aguascalientes
- Position: Small forward
- League: LNBP

Personal information
- Born: July 19, 1994 (age 32) Toronto, Ontario, Canada
- Listed height: 6 ft 7 in (2.01 m)
- Listed weight: 240 lb (109 kg)

Career information
- High school: Christian Faith Center Academy (Creedmoor, North Carolina); 22 Feet Academy (Jackson, Kentucky)
- College: Illinois State (2014–2017); Oregon (2017–2018)
- NBA draft: 2018: undrafted
- Playing career: 2018–present

Career history
- 2018: Anyang KGC
- 2018–2019: Raptors 905
- 2019: Hamilton Honey Badgers
- 2019–2020: Oostende
- 2020–2021: ESSM Le Portel
- 2021–2022: Tasmania JackJumpers
- 2023–2024: College Park Skyhawks
- 2025–2026: Vancouver Bandits
- 2026–present: Panteras de Aguascalientes

Career highlights
- Second-team All-MVC (2017)

MiKyle Mervyn McIntosh (born July 19, 1994) is a Canadian professional basketball player for the Vancouver Bandits of the Canadian Elite Basketball League. He played college basketball for the Illinois State Redbirds and the Oregon Ducks.

== Early life ==
McIntosh is a native of Pickering, Ontario. He attended the Christian Faith Center Academy in Creedmoor, North Carolina. For his senior season he transferred to Breathitt County High School while playing basketball at 22 Feet Academy. McIntosh averaged 17.6 points, 6.0 rebounds and 4.2 assists per game, shooting 46 percent from the floor for 22 ft Academy. McIntosh received recruiting attention from UCLA, Miami, and Kentucky but committed to Illinois State.

== College career ==
McIntosh was ruled a non-qualifier by the NCAA and had to redshirt his freshman year at Illinois State. As a sophomore, McIntosh averaged 10.9 points and 4.8 rebounds and was named MVC Most Improved Player. On January 16, 2017, McIntosh was named Missouri Valley Conference Player of the Week after contributing 20 points, five rebounds and four assists in a win against Wichita State. As a junior, McIntosh averaged 12.5 points and 5.6 rebounds per game on a team that won a school-record 28 games and the MVC regular season title. He was named to the Second Team All-Missouri Valley Conference. After the season, McIntosh took advantage of the NCAA graduate transfer rule to move to another program without sitting out a season. He chose Oregon after considering an offer from Oklahoma. In his senior season at Oregon, McIntosh posted 11.8 points and 6.1 rebounds per game.

== Professional career ==
After going undrafted in the 2018 NBA draft, McIntosh signed a summer league deal with the Portland Trail Blazers. On August 18, 2018, McIntosh signed with Anyang KGC of the Korean Basketball League. On December 20, he moved to Raptors 905 of the NBA G League. McIntosh averaged 10.8 points, 5.2 rebounds and 1 assist per game.

After the conclusion of the 2018–19 NBA G League season, McIntosh was drafted into the startup Canadian Elite Basketball League's Hamilton Honey Badgers, where he would reunite with former Raptors 905 teammates, Derek Cooke and Duane Notice. In July 2019, he signed with BC Oostende in Belgium.

On June 15, 2020, he has signed with ESSM Le Portel of the French LNB Pro A.

On August 12, 2021, McIntosh signed with the Tasmania JackJumpers for the 2021–22 NBL season.

=== College Park Skyhawks (2023–2024) ===
On October 29, 2023, McIntosh joined the College Park Skyhawks of the NBA G League.

=== Vancouver Bandits (2025) ===
On May 21, 2025 McIntosh signed with the Vancouver Bandits of the Canadian Elite Basketball League.
