= Whick, Kentucky =

Unincorporated community in Kentucky, United States

Whick
- Unincorporated community
- Location within the state of Kentucky Whick (the United States)
- Coordinates: 37°25′18″N 83°22′34″W
- Country: United States
- State: Kentucky
- County: Breathitt
- Elevation: 807 ft (246 m)
- Time zone: UTC-6 (Central (CST))
  - Summer (DST): UTC-5 (CST)
- ZIP codes: 41390
- GNIS feature ID: 516291

Whick is an unincorporated community and coal town in Breathitt County, Kentucky, United States. Its post office closed in 2004.
