= Wolf Coal, Kentucky =

Unincorporated community in Kentucky, United States

Wolf Coal
- Unincorporated community
- Location within the state of Kentucky Wolf Coal (the United States)
- Coordinates: 37°23′54″N 83°22′40″W
- Country: United States
- State: Kentucky
- County: Breathitt
- Elevation: 787 ft (240 m)
- Time zone: UTC-5 (Eastern (EST))
  - Summer (DST): UTC-4 (EDT)
- ZIP codes: 41393
- GNIS feature ID: 516432

Wolf Coal is an unincorporated community and coal town located in Breathitt County, Kentucky, United States.
