= Kentucky Mountain Holiness Association =

American Christian denomination

- Classification: Methodist
- Orientation: Wesleyan-Holiness movement
- Theology: Wesleyan-Arminian
- Leader: Rev. David Spencer
- Associations: Christian Holiness Partnership
- Region: Eastern Kentucky
- Founder: Dr. Lela G. McConnell
- Origin: 1925; Vancleve, Kentucky
- Separated from: Methodist Episcopal Church (1925)
- Congregations: 13
- Primary schools: Mount Carmel High School, Mount Carmel Elementary School
- Secondary schools: Kentucky Mountain Bible College

The Kentucky Mountain Holiness Association (KMHA) is a Christian denomination in eastern Kentucky aligned with Holiness Methodist beliefs. The Association was begun in 1925 by Lela G. McConnell, a deaconess in the Methodist Episcopal Church. The Association maintains a Wesleyan-Holiness doctrine with a strong emphasis on sanctification. The association maintains an elementary school, a high school, a four-year Bible college, two radio stations, a district of churches, and a farm. Rev. David Spencer is the current association president.

Although the Kentucky Mountain Holiness Association has 15 member churches, it does not consider itself to be a "denomination," and many of its member churches list themselves as "non-denominational." The Kentucky Mountain Holiness Association joined the National Holiness Association as a member (now known as the Christian Holiness Partnership), though many of its members are present at the Interchurch Holiness Convention as well.

== History ==
The first organization, the Mount Carmel Church and School, was established by Dr. Lela G. McConnell in 1925. The first groundbreaking was on 10 March 1925. The Kentucky Mountain Holiness Association was formally incorporated in February 1931, and the Vancleve Bible School, known as the Kentucky Mountain Bible Institute (later Kentucky Mountain Bible College) was opened in October of the same year. A second grade school was opened in Lee City in 1935. A 100-acre farm was purchased for $4500 on July 3, 1942. The radio station was added by private donations, and went on the air July 23, 1948.

== Member organizations ==
=== Schools ===
- Kentucky Mountain Bible College, Vancleve, KY
- Mount Carmel Schools, Vancleve, KY

=== Radio stations ===
The KMHA operates a Moody-affiliate radio station. It features both local, Southern Gospel programming and DJs, as well as syndicated shows and SRN news.

- WMTC-FM 99.9 FM, Vancleve, Kentucky

=== Churches ===
- Bear Pen Worship Center, Campton, KY
- Burning Fork Community Church, Salyersville, KY
- Five Mile Community Church, Vancleve, KY
- Index Community Church, West Liberty, KY
- Lakeview Community Church, Salt Lick, KY
- London Community Church, London, KY
- Mt. Carmel Community Church, Vancleve, KY
- Old Time Religion Chapel, Campton, KY
- Red River Community Church, Hazel Green, KY
- Spencer Fork Community Church, Booneville, KY
- Tallega Community Church, Beattyville, KY
- Wide Creek Community Church, Lee County, KY
- Woodsbend Community Church, West Liberty, KY
- Jackson Community Church, Breathitt County, Kentucky
- Sharpsburg Community Church

Sharpsburg, KY

=== Farm ===
- KMHA Farms, Vancleve, KY
