= Hazard Community and Technical College =

Public college in Hazard, Kentucky, US

- Type: Public community college
- Established: 1968
- Affiliations: Kentucky Community and Technical College System
- President: Jennifer Lindon
- Students: 4,717
- Location: Hazard, Kentucky, United States; 38°14′6″N 83°10′33″W
- Colors: Navy █ and Gold █
- Website: hazard.kctcs.edu

Hazard Community and Technical College (HCTC) is a public community college with its main campus in Hazard, Kentucky, United States. It is part of the Kentucky Community and Technical College System (KCTCS). Established as Hazard Community College in 1968, the name of the college was changed to Hazard Community and Technical College in 2003. HCTC has four campuses: the Hazard Campus and Technical Campus, both in Hazard, the Lees College Campus in Jackson (formerly Lees College, est. 1883), and the Leslie County Center. HCTC is accredited by the Southern Association of Colleges and Schools (SACS).

== Service area ==
The primary service area of HCTC includes:

- Breathitt County
- Knott County
- Lee County
- Leslie County
- Letcher County
- Owsley County
- Perry County
- Wolfe County

== Campuses ==
Hazard Community and Technical College (HCTC) consists of several campus locations as well as offering classes online.

=== HCTC Hazard Campus ===
HCTC Hazard Campus is located right off Highway 15 in Hazard, Kentucky. Selected Allied Health classes also are offered in the Bailey-Stumbo Building at the University of Kentucky Center for Rural Health adjacent to the Appalachian Regional Medical Center in Hazard, located 4 miles from the Hazard Campus. The campus includes the First Federal Center (FFC), the J. Marvin Jolly Classroom Center (JCC), and the Challenger Learning Center.

=== HCTC Lees College Campus ===
HCTC Lees College Campus is located in Jackson, Kentucky. The campus consists of Jackson Hall, J. Phil Smith Administration Building, Van Meter Gymnasium, Telford Computer Center, Library/Science Building, and the Breathitt County Life Skills Center.

=== HCTC Technical Campus ===
HCTC Technical Campus is located 3 miles from the Hazard Campus in Hazard, Kentucky, and is the home of many of HCTC s technical programs. Buildings include Devert Owens Building, Walter Prater Education Center, Industrial Education Building, and Heavy Equipment Building. The Technical Campus also houses HCTC s Kentucky Coal Academy and Smart Energy Training Center.

=== HCTC Leslie County Center ===
HCTC Leslie County Center is located 21 miles west of the Hazard Campus in Hyden, Kentucky. This location also houses the renowned Kentucky School of Bluegrass and Traditional Music. Classes toward the Associate in Arts and Associate in Science degrees, as well as specialized workshops, are offered at this center.
