= Lees College =

Lees College Campus of Hazard Community and Technical College is a campus a public community college campus in Jackson, Kentucky, United States. It is a campus of Hazard Community and Technical College and was founded in 1883 as Jackson Academy, an elementary and high school for Breathitt County. It is one of the oldest higher education institutions in the region. In 1996, college board voted to close the college and become part of the University of Kentucky's Community College System. A year later, state legislature passed a bill to take all community and technical colleges of the state and form the Kentucky Community and Technical College System. Once KCTCS was formed, the campus became part of Hazard Community and Technical College as a northern hub campus to the college's service area.

== History ==
=== Founding of Jackson Academy ===
John J. Dickey came to the small town of Jackson in November 1882 in an effort to convince the community to start a high school. His mission was to establish a high school in every county seat in Eastern Kentucky. He aimed to educate young men so that they could attend Kentucky colleges in (Lexington, Winchester, Danville, Georgetown etc. The expectation was that graduates would return home to teach other children.

Jackson was one of the many places where he had planned to stop. However, his horse became lame and Dickey was stuck in Jackson for a few weeks. During this time, he visited the homes of many residents and found a great need for education. The town had only two elementary schools and no high school in the entire county. In January 1883, Dickey began a subscription school with the help of R.A. Hurst (a local lawyer and teacher). The school was located in the basement of the county courthouse, with Dickey serving as principal and Hurst his assistant. There were initially 51 pupils.

During this time, Anson G.P. Dodge was staying in Jackson. He was the son of William E. Dodge, a Member of Congress for New York City, a millionaire and philanthropist. Anson Dodge represented the Kentucky Union Railroad Company (later the Lexington and Eastern Railway) and wanted to build a railroad through the region – specifically the county. He proposed that Dickey move the school to Jackson, build up the morale and intellectual side, and he (Dodge) would build up the material side of Jackson: to allow it to become a "great country". Dodge offered board and tuition to 25 young men of the county for three years. The catch: that the people of Breathitt County would provide a school building and a boardinghouse for the students. This was the start of what became Old Lees, now the J. Phil Smith Administration Building.

The new building would not come easily. Dickey wanted to secure subscriptions to build the new school building and secure a deed to have the building erected. He proposed erecting a $10,000 brick building, and Dodge pledged to provide $3,500 for a building if the people of Breathitt County could raise $3,500 themselves.

Trustees of the public school were formed by the summer of 1883: John Jay Dickey (president), S.H. Patrick (secretary), William M. Combs (treasurer), S.H. Hurst, E.C. Strong, Willie Spencer, and Sam Jett. This ensured a committee to secure a site for the building and article of incorporation for the continuity of the school.

By October 1883, more than $3,657 had been raised for the building, but there was no property owned on which to erect the building. The first students graduated in May 1885, but land was not acquired until 1886. At that point the school acquired more than 3 acres of land. A contract was agreed to build the building for $4,680 – a far cry from the original plan of $10,000. It was to be made of brick, with two stories, have a chapel, a bell tower, a basement, and multiple classrooms. This building would not be completed until the summer of 1888 due to many financial complications with the contractor. In addition, Dodge failed to pay his balance and Dickey assumed responsibility for Dodge's pledge.

By July 1890, Dickey had resigned his responsibilities as principal of Jackson Academy to take over as editor of the Jackson Hustler, a newspaper in Jackson. D. Floyd Hagins was elected to succeed Dickey as principal. Dickey remained in Jackson until 1895 when he moved to London, Kentucky to help with the building of the Bennett Memorial School, later the Sue Bennett College.

=== Acquisition by Central University ===
When Dickey resigned, the board of trustees still owed the building contractor $4,000. To address this debt but keep the school open, in 1891 the trustees sold the property to Lindsay Hughes Blanton, acting representative for Central University in Richmond, Kentucky. The school's name was changed to Jackson Collegiate Institution, and it encompassed all grades from primary to higher education.

=== Donations ===
In 1897 Susanna Preston Walker Lees (otherwise known as Susan P. Lees), of New York, made large donations to the institute. This money was used to remodel the school building. In honor of the renovation, Central University decided to rename the school as S.P. Lees Collegiate Institute. The main building was known as Old Lees. When Susanna Lees died in 1902, she left $20,000 to the institute.

Cyrus H. McCormick of Chicago also donated money to the school. Another building was acquired through these donations, a chapel in South Jackson across from the railroad depot. It was renamed the McCormick Chapel. Besides church services it was used as a school.

=== Transition in the early 1900s ===
At this time the institute's owning body, Central University, was going through tough financial times of its own. They had lost a few programs and faced low enrollment. Central University therefore merged with Centre College, which it had split from with three decades before. All institution control went to Centre College's main campus in Danville and the university changed its name to Central University of Kentucky. (It changed back to Centre College in 1918 due to a Kentucky legislation ruling). All the buildings in Richmond in 1906 were used for a new institution, known as Eastern Kentucky State Normal School; today it is Eastern Kentucky University.

In October 1906, control of S. P. Lees Collegiate Institute was passed to the Southern Synod of Kentucky (Presbyterian Church), which had been responsible for Central University before the consolidation.

Around this time (by 1911) the board of trustees sold a piece of property on Highland Avenue to the Jackson Grade Common School. It built an elementary school and, later, a high school. This became Jackson Independent Schools, locally known as Jackson City School.

=== Upgrade to a junior college ===
In 1917, the board of trustees elected John C. Hanley as president of Lees. The board hired him to upgrade the institution to a junior college. By doing so, it would have to meet the standards of the accreditation of the Southern Association of Colleges and Schools to be declared a "junior college" i.e. biology labs, cafeteria, dormitory space, curriculum, library, extracurricular activities, efficient faculty (with the degrees standard to teach), and so on.

In response, Lees did start a Boys and Girls Basketball teams. They used the neighboring Jackson City School's Gymnasium (now their old gym) as their home court and adopted a mascot, the Bearcats (changed to Generals around the 1950s). But by 1925 when Hanley left to become president of Sayre School in Lexington, Kentucky, the school had failed to become a junior college.

In October 1927, Lees Collegiate Institution finally became Lees Junior College, offering two years of college coursework. Even following this, there were arguments about accreditation.

Jackson Hall (co-ed dorm) also opened in 1927. It replaced Little Hall, which had been struck by lightning and burned down. The new hall was named after the city because the residents had donated to help build a new dormitory.

Around the same time, Lees Junior College was in the news as they started their inaugural football season. "St. Xavier U. beats Lees College: 132-0". Many of the players were still in high school (Jackson City) and new to football.

=== Van Meter's development of the college ===
In 1928 President Donald W. Miller left the college and Jesse O. Van Meter was hired as acting president. The chairman of the board of trustees asked Van Meter to keep the college open until February 1, 1929, when it was assumed it would be shut down, because of financial and accreditation problems.

Yet in less than a year Van Meter had achieved a fully accredited faculty, clean facilities, cemented sidewalks and updated scientific equipment for the school. The student body more than doubled from 33 to over 100 students in a semester. Two years later there were more than 300 students. Van Meter devised an early method of student loans with one of the local banks. He ensured the survival of the school for decades to come.

In the 1930s, Van Meter created a football field, the Barkley Bowl, named after (then) Senator and future vice president Alben W. Barkley. It was completed in 1935, with funding from the Works Progress Administration and donations.

Lees continued to grow through the 1930s and 40s, to an average of 350 students a semester. Enrolment was lower during World War II and the college had to shut down for a semester.

Van Meter retired in 1948. Van Meter Gymnasium, completed in 1957, was named in his honor. This also contained rooms for the music/orchestra program, a stage for the arts/music program, a student center with a bowling lane, a multipurpose room, and later an electric organ inside the main gymnasium. This was supported by fundraising of $250,000 under the motto, "Lees College: the Great Mountain Benefactress".

=== The 1950s, 60s and 70s ===
After the retirement of Van Meter, the college continued to grow despite disputes over whether to keep accreditation. Robert Landolt (president 1948–58) oversaw the building of Van Meter Gymnasium and the growth of men's basketball. A starring member of the 1954-55 basketball team, Kenneth Paul Mink, later achieved international fame when he became a member of the Roane State College team, Harriman, Tn., at age73, becoming the world's oldest college basketball player (2008-09). The administrations of J. Phil Smith (1958–1959) and Lawrence H. Hollander (1959–1960) did not last long, but continued the growth and prosperity of Lees Junior College. In 1961, Troy R. Eslinger became president of Lees and remained in post for 27 years.

Eslinger oversaw many changes to the campus, including the renovation of Old Lees and the removal of the belltower.

In 1963 the board of trustees began plans to build a new dorm room because of the overflow of Jackson Hall and the very small Bach Hall. With the help of the E.O. Robinson Mountain Fund and Mr. and Mrs. Robert Meteer, the new dorm was completed in 1966. It was called Meteer Hall, as the Meteers had donated $10,000 towards it.

Around the same time, E.O. Robinson Mountain Fund provided a second gift as it proposed to donate $25,000 to the college on the basis that they match the funds. This was the start of the plans for the new Library/Science Building on campus.

By the 1980s, Lees trustees were planning to update more of its campus. In Nancy Stamper Begley's Had It Not Been for Lees, she talks about plans for a new Performing Arts Student Center, with building to begin in the 1983–84 school year. The project fell through, possibly because of financial difficulties.

Lees Junior College officially changed its name to Lees College in 1984. It remained a private two-year liberal arts college despite the name change.

Eslinger retired in 1988.

=== Financial difficulties in the 1990s ===
In the 1990s Lees had financial problems. This was due to many factors: being a private college in a region of poverty; the spread of public institutions nearby; competition with other institutions for funding; little endowment; and many other factors. Enrollment was not the problem – the college was about average with about a 350 student population.

The board of trustees asked Charles Derrickson (a former alumnus and faculty member of Morehead State University) to help fix the situation after William Bradshaw resigned to move to another institution in 1992. Derrickson found that it was financially difficult to keep the college going and felt that the only way to not have the doors closed would be to have an outside institution take over. He convinced the board that this was the case.

Derrickson looked into several different institutes including Morehead State University, Pikeville College (now University of Pikeville), and the University of Kentucky. Eventually, the University of Kentucky were interested as they had tried to acquire Sue Bennett College, but this had fallen through due to a disagreement with SBC's board.

So, in December 1995, President Derrickson and the board of trustees signed the land and the facilities over to the University of Kentucky. This transfer officially took place in July 1996 once the Fall academic year began. Many local residents disagreed with this move, but others believed that this was the best option to keep the campus open.

Lees College became Lees College Campus of Hazard Community College. This name only stuck for a year when the KCTCS was formed by Kentucky Legislature by passing the Postsecondary Improvement Act of 1997. This meant that all community colleges became their own independent system (away from their universities) and added technical campuses as well.

Lees College, Inc. continues to support the campus and its students financially today.

== Principals, heads and presidents ==
=== Principals ===
- John Jay Dickey (January 1883 – October 1890)
- D. Floyd Hagins (October 1890 – April 1891)

=== Headmasters ===
- Eugene P. Mickel (April 1891 – 1893)
- Charles Alexander Logan (1893–1897)
- J.M. Moore/W.O. Shewmaker (1898–1899) +joint management+
- William Dinwiddie (1900–1903)
- M.L. Girton (1903–1907)

=== Presidents ===
- Lester Crego (1907–1908)
- Charles Augustine Leonard (June 1908 – spring 1915)
- R.M. Lacy (1915 – June 1917)
- John C. Hanley (spring 1917 – 1925)
- Sanford McBrayer Logan (1925 – spring 1927)
- Donald Wilson Miller (1927 – spring 1928)
- Jesse Oliver Van Meter (1928 – December 31, 1948)
- Robert G. Landolt (1949–1958)
- J. Phil Smith (July 1958 – July 1959)
- Lawrence H. Hollander (July 1959 – November 30, 1960)
- Frazier B. Adams (December 1–31, 1960)
- Troy Rhudy Eslinger (January 1, 1961 – May 1988)
- William Brandt Bradshaw (June 1988 – July 31, 1992)
- Charles Derrickson (August 1, 1992 – May 1996)

== Campus ==
- J. Phil Smith Administration Building – formerly known as Old Lees, it is the main administration building on campus and for the northern hub of HCTCS
- Van Meter Gymnasium – used for student activities, basketball, classrooms and a student lounge
- Jackson Hall – holds classrooms, conference rooms, offices, a cafeteria and a bookstore
- E.O. Robinson Library and Science Building – holds classrooms and the Lees College Library
- Robert L. Telford Technology Center – newly renovated center for labs, technology, and classrooms
- Combs Building – located at the corner of Main Street and Washington Avenue
- Breathitt County Life Skills Center – once the Jefferson Hotel and located on Main Street, it now houses offices and classrooms of many different higher education institutions including those of Morehead State University at Jackson and HCTCS

== Former campus buildings and facilities ==
- Little Hall was built around 1890 and destroyed by a fire around 1926. Named for C.J. Little, it was located on Washington Avenue where Jackson Hall is today. It was used as a women's boarding house
- McCormick Chapel was bought around 1905 and sold around the 1930s. It was located on Railroad Street across from the old Jackson Train and Freight Depot in South Jackson. The building still stands and is used for religious services but is no longer affiliated with the college.
- Barkley Bowl was built in 1935 by WPA funds and demolished in 1963. It was used for football and baseball for the college and Jackson City School. Both programs were short-lived and it was then used for campus and community events.
- Bach Hall was built around the 1920s and demolished in 2011. Once located on Main Street across from the Robinson Library, it was, originally, Bach Hospital (not associated with the college). It was acquired by the college in the 1940s to be a dormitory due to the overflow of Jackson Hall. In 1963, it was replaced by Meteer Hall. Morehead State University eventually used the space as part of their regional campuses but moved out in 2004. The building was empty for years until demolished.
- Lees' Bookstore Building wasbuilt around the 1910s and demolished around 2005. It was located on the corner of Jefferson Avenue and Highland Avenue. The building wasn't affiliated with the college until it was acquired by the college around the 1960s. It was initially used for offices and classrooms, but eventually became a bookstore for the college. Once Jackson Hall was renovated around the late 1990s, the bookstore was moved to the basement of Jackson Hall and the building returned to use as classrooms and offices until it was decided to level the building for expanded parking for the college.
- Meteer Hall was built around 1966 and demolished in 2009. The building was on the south end of campus adjacent to Highland Avenue, across from the Jackson City Schools. It was in use as a dormitory until 2006.
- College Avenue Building was located next to the Breathitt County Public Library; the building was sold in 2013.
