= Jackson Methodist Church (Jackson, Kentucky) =

American historic building, built 1922

- Jackson First United Methodist Church
- U.S. National Register of Historic Places
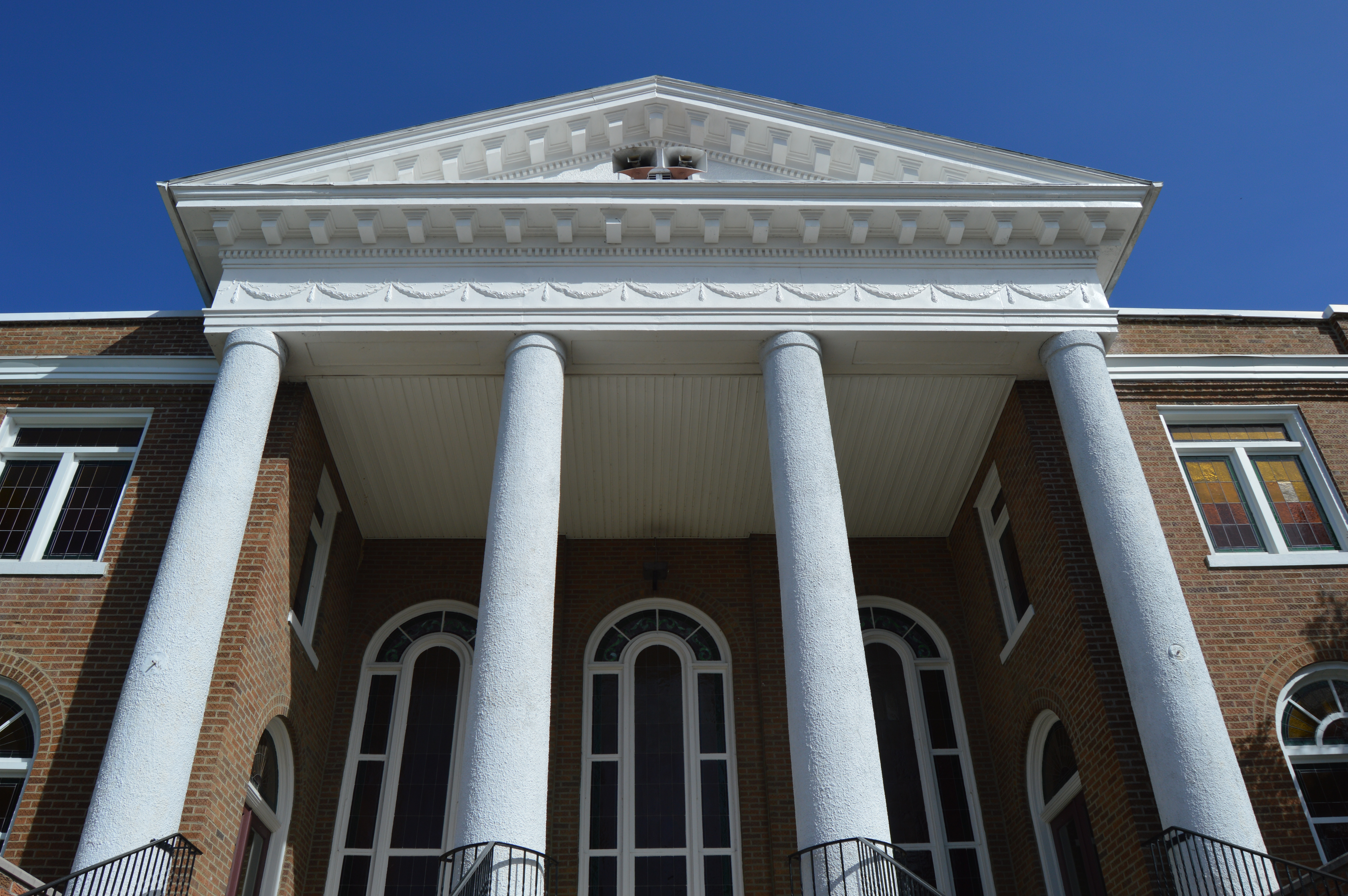
- Jackson First United Methodist Church

- Location within Kentucky Location within the United States
- Location: 1022 College Ave., Jackson, Kentucky
- Coordinates: 37°33′10″N 83°23′2″W
- Area: 0.4 acres (0.16 ha)
- Built: 1922
- Architect: Harris, Willard
- Architectural style: Classical Revival
- MPS: Jackson MRA
- NRHP reference No.: 86000280
- Added to NRHP: February 21, 1986

The Jackson First United Methodist Church is a historic church at 1022 College Ave. in Jackson, Kentucky. It was built in 1922. It was added to the National Register of Historic Places in 1986 as M.E. Church, South.

It is a United Methodist church.

It has a two-story Classical Revival sanctuary with a monumental portico. It was built of brick to replace the congregation's previous building, which had been destroyed by fire.
