= John Swanel Inskip =

American minister and evangelist (1816–1884)

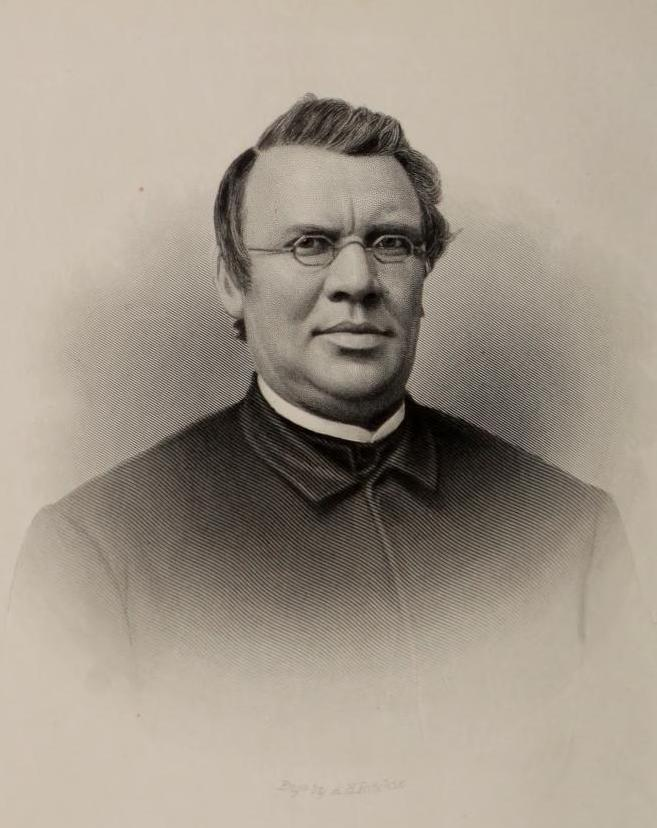
- Born: August 10, 1816; Huntingdon, England
- Died: March 7, 1884 (aged 67); Ocean Grove, New Jersey, US
- Resting place: Green-Wood Cemetery, Brooklyn, New York City
- Citizenship: United States
- Education: Dickinson College (attended)
- Occupations: Minister; evangelist
- Title: President, National Camp Meeting Association for the Promotion of Holiness
- Spouse: Martha Jane Inskip (m. 1836)

John Swanel Inskip (August 10, 1816 – March 7, 1884) was an American minister and evangelist affiliated with the Methodist Episcopal Church. He was a proponent of family sittings in church and a leader in the holiness movement, serving as founder and president of the National Camp Meeting Association for the Promotion of Holiness from 1867 until his death.

== Early life and education ==
Inskip was born in Huntingdon, England, on August 10, 1816, to businessman Edward Inskip and Martha Swanel. The family emigrated to Wilmington, Delaware, in 1820 and moved to Chester County, Pennsylvania, in 1832. His father was a religious skeptic, but his mother prayed and read the Bible to her children. Converted by Levi Scott on April 10, 1832, Inskip joined the Methodist Episcopal congregation in London Grove Township and became a local preacher on May 23, 1835. He attended Dickinson College in 1835, though he rarely spoke of his time there and probably left the college within a year.

== Ministries ==
Inskip preached in three circuits in the Philadelphia area and achieved ordination as a deacon in Wilmington in 1838. He became a preacher in charge for the first time at Easton, Pennsylvania, in 1840. He was ordained an elder in Philadelphia that year. From 1841 to 1845 he served churches in or near Philadelphia, gaining large numbers of converts.

In 1846, Inskip transferred to the Ohio Conference of the Methodist Episcopal Church and preached in Cincinnati, Dayton, Urbana, Springfield, and Troy. In 1847, he condemned the Mexican War in a sermon, prompting denunciations printed in Dayton newspapers. As a pastor in Dayton and Springfield, he encouraged "family sittings" or "promiscuous sittings", allowing men and women to sit together in church and renting pews to families to raise funds. Although his congregations supported promiscuous sittings, the practice scandalized other church leaders. Inskip defended the practice in his 1851 book Methodism Explained and Defended. The Ohio Conference voted to "admonish him of his error" in 1851. Inskip appealed this ruling to the 1852 General Conference, which reversed the Ohio Conference's decision.

In 1852, Inskip moved back east to serve pastorates at a total of five churches in New York and Brooklyn. In 1861, he enlisted as chaplain of the Union Army's 14th Brooklyn Regiment, resigning fourteen months later due to poor health and resuming his preaching first in Birmingham, Connecticut, and then in New York City and Baltimore.

== Holiness movement ==
During the years following the Civil War, Inskip became a leader of the holiness movement, which stressed the doctrine of entire sanctification and demanded members lead sinless lives. In 1867 in Vineland, New Jersey, he founded and became the first president of the National Camp Meeting Association for the Promotion of Holiness, which organized camp meetings and revival meetings across the country and sought to promote a more disciplined emotionalism than was typical of revivals at the time. Inskip spent the next fifteen years as a peripatetic evangelist, touring the United States and even visiting England, India, and Australia to conduct revival meetings in 1880–1881. He also edited the weekly Christian Standard and Home Journal, published in Philadelphia as an organ of the national holiness movement from 1876 to 1884. Inskip also edited Holiness Miscellany, an 1882 collection of essays by other holiness movement leaders explaining and relaying personal experiences of entire sanctification.

== Personal life ==
Inskip married Martha Jane Foster in November 1836 and had one child with her. She played important roles as organizer, fundraiser, and teacher throughout his ministry.

In October 1883, Inskip suffered a paralyzing stroke from which he never recovered. He died at his seaside cottage on March 7, 1884, in Ocean Grove, New Jersey.

His remains were interred at the Green-Wood Cemetery in Brooklyn.
