= Christian Holiness Partnership =

Ecumenical Organization of Christian Holiness Groups

The Christian Holiness Partnership is an international organization of individuals, organizational and denominational affiliates within the holiness movement. It was founded under the leadership of Rev. John Swanel Inskip in 1867 as the National Camp Meeting Association for Christian Holiness, later changing its name to the National Holiness Association, by which it was known until 1997, when its current name was adopted. Its stated purpose is to promote "the message of scriptural holiness" primarily through evangelistic camp meetings. The Christian Holiness Partnership is headquartered in Clinton, Tennessee.

The Christian Holiness Partnership facilitates cooperative efforts among denominations, camp meetings, institutions such as colleges, seminaries, missionary agencies and publishing houses, and individuals.

Its membership includes twenty-one denominations, three missionary agencies, forty-eight colleges and seminaries, six publishing houses, two thousand camp meetings, and individual local churches (some of which are independent).

The last known website for the organization is holiness.org as captured by Internet Archive on October, 18. 2001. The site documented both Dr. Marlin Hotle (editor of the Holiness Digest and the District Superintendent of the Tennessee District of The Wesleyan Church) as the Executive Director of the Christian Holiness Partnership and the Partnership Press as publisher for the CHP.

== Member bodies ==
As of 2005, affiliated Protestant churches and organizations included:

- American Rescue Workers
- The Association of Evangelical Churches, Inc.
- Association of Independent Methodists
- Bible Holiness Movement
- Brethren in Christ Church
- Churches of Christ in Christian Union
- Church of God (Anderson)
- Church of the Nazarene
- Congregational Methodist Church
- Evangelical Christian Church
- Evangelical Church of North America
- Evangelical Friends Church - Eastern Region
- Evangelical Methodist Church
- Free Methodist Church
- Japan Immanuel General Mission
- Kentucky Mountain Holiness Association
- Missionary Church (North Central District)
- Primitive Methodist Church
- The Salvation Army (USA)
- The Salvation Army (Canada & Bermuda)
- United Methodist Church
- Wesleyan Church

== See also ==
- Interchurch Holiness Convention
- Wesleyan Holiness Consortium
- Global Wesleyan Alliance
- World Gospel Mission
