= Breathitt County Jail =

- U.S. National Register of Historic Places
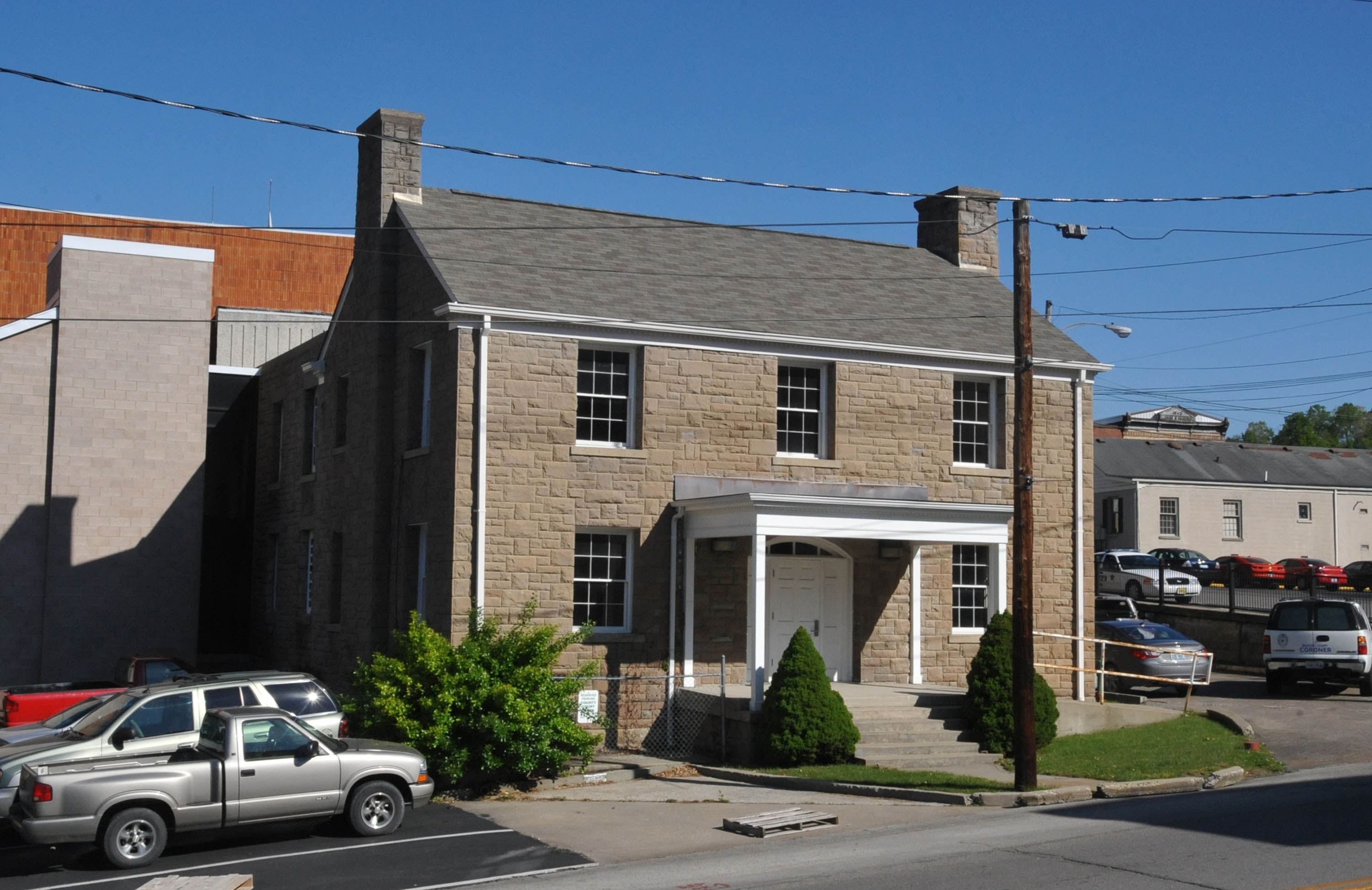

- Location within Kentucky Location within the United States
- Location: 1027 College St., Jackson, Kentucky
- Coordinates: 37°33′11″N 83°23′3″W
- Area: 0.2 acres (0.081 ha)
- Built: c. 1934
- Built by: Works Progress Administration
- Architectural style: Classical Revival
- MPS: Jackson MRA
- NRHP reference No.: 86000271
- Added to NRHP: February 21, 1986

Breathitt County Jail is a historic building in Jackson, Kentucky, United States. The Works Progress Administration built it around 1934 as part of their work in Breathitt County. The ashlar stone jail has a three-bay facade, stone chimneys on each side, and a central porch with an arched doorway. Breathitt County Jail was added to the National Register of Historic Places on February 21, 1986.
