= Stacey Hotel =

- U.S. National Register of Historic Places
- Location: Broadway and College Sts., Jackson, Kentucky
- Coordinates: 37°33′09″N 83°23′04″W
- Area: 0.1 acres (0.040 ha)
- Built: 1914-1920
- MPS: Jackson MRA
- NRHP reference No.: 86000282
- Added to NRHP: February 21, 1986

The Stacey Hotel, at Broadway and College Sts. in Jackson, Kentucky, was built during 1914 to 1920. It was listed on the National Register of Historic Places in 1986.

It was a three-story, six-bay brick commercial building with a cast iron first floor facade. It had rounded arched windows with brick corbelling.

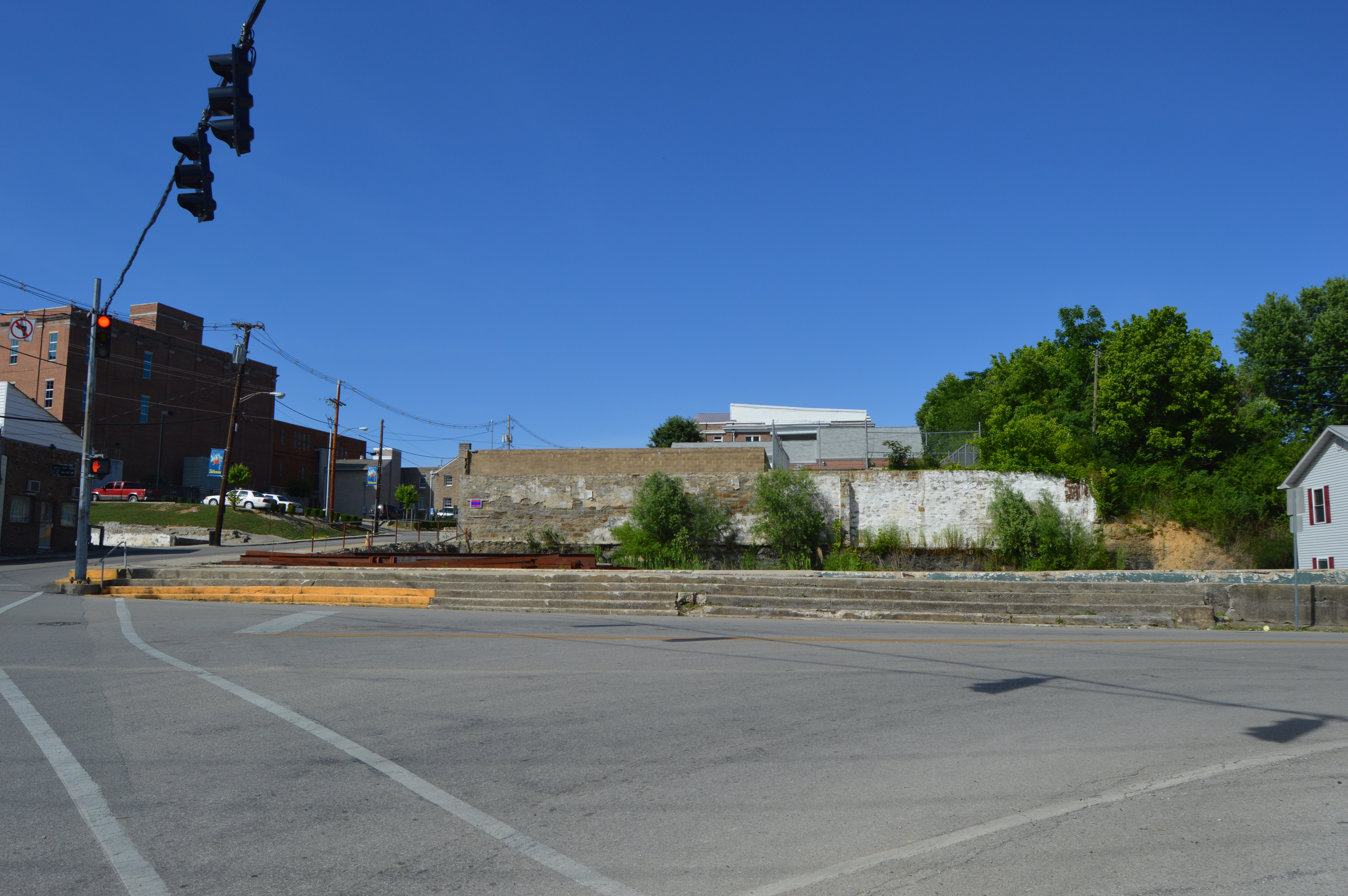
Photo of site in 2014, sans hotel.

The building appears to have been destroyed or moved.
