= Jackson Commercial District =

Historic district in Kentucky, United States

- U.S. National Register of Historic Places
- U.S. Historic district
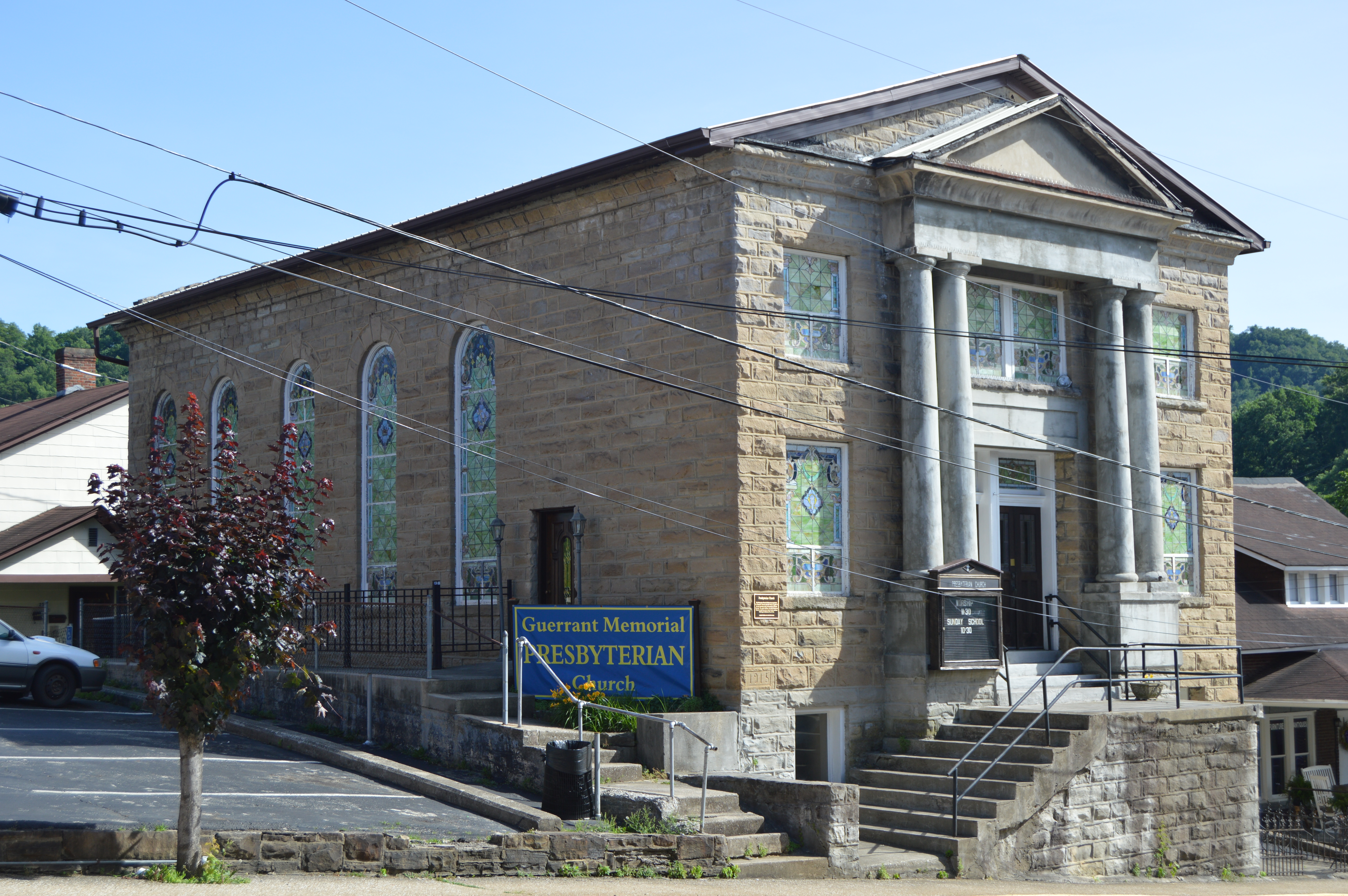

- Location within Kentucky Location within the United States
- Location: Main Street between Court Street West to Broadway Street, Jackson, Kentucky
- Coordinates: 37°33′11″N 83°23′08″W
- Area: 2.8 acres (1.1 ha)
- Architect: Multiple
- Architectural style: Classical Revival, Late Gothic Revival, Mixed (more Than 2 Styles From Different Periods)
- MPS: Jackson MRA
- NRHP reference No.: 86000284
- Added to NRHP: February 21, 1986

The Jackson Commercial District in Jackson, Kentucky is a 2.8 acres (1.1 ha) historic district which was listed on the National Register of Historic Places in 1986. The listing included 13 contributing buildings, two non-contributing buildings and two non-contributing sites.

It covers Main Street from Court Street West to Broadway South. Most of the buildings are two-story brick buildings. According to its NRHP nomination, "the buildings are Jackson's best examples of the vernacular style of the era. Technology and craftsmanship are apparent in the cast iron storefronts, pressed metal cornices, brick corbelling, and stone work."

It includes:

- Hotel Jefferson
- Guerrant Memorial Presbyterian Church
- Kash Building
- more.
