= Crain's Wholesale and Retail Store =

- U.S. National Register of Historic Places
- Location: College and Broadway Sts., Jackson, Kentucky
- Coordinates: 37°33′08″N 83°23′05″W
- Area: 0.1 acres (0.040 ha)
- Built: c.1908-1914
- Built by: Mesker, George, Ironworks, other
- MPS: Jackson MRA
- NRHP reference No.: 86000272
- Added to NRHP: February 21, 1986

Crain's Wholesale and Retail Store, at College and Broadway Sts. in Jackson, Kentucky, was built in c.1908-1914. It was listed on the National Register of Historic Places in 1986.

It was a two-story nine-bay brick commercial building. It has a pressed metal cornice and a cast iron facade first floor produced by the George Mesker Ironworks.

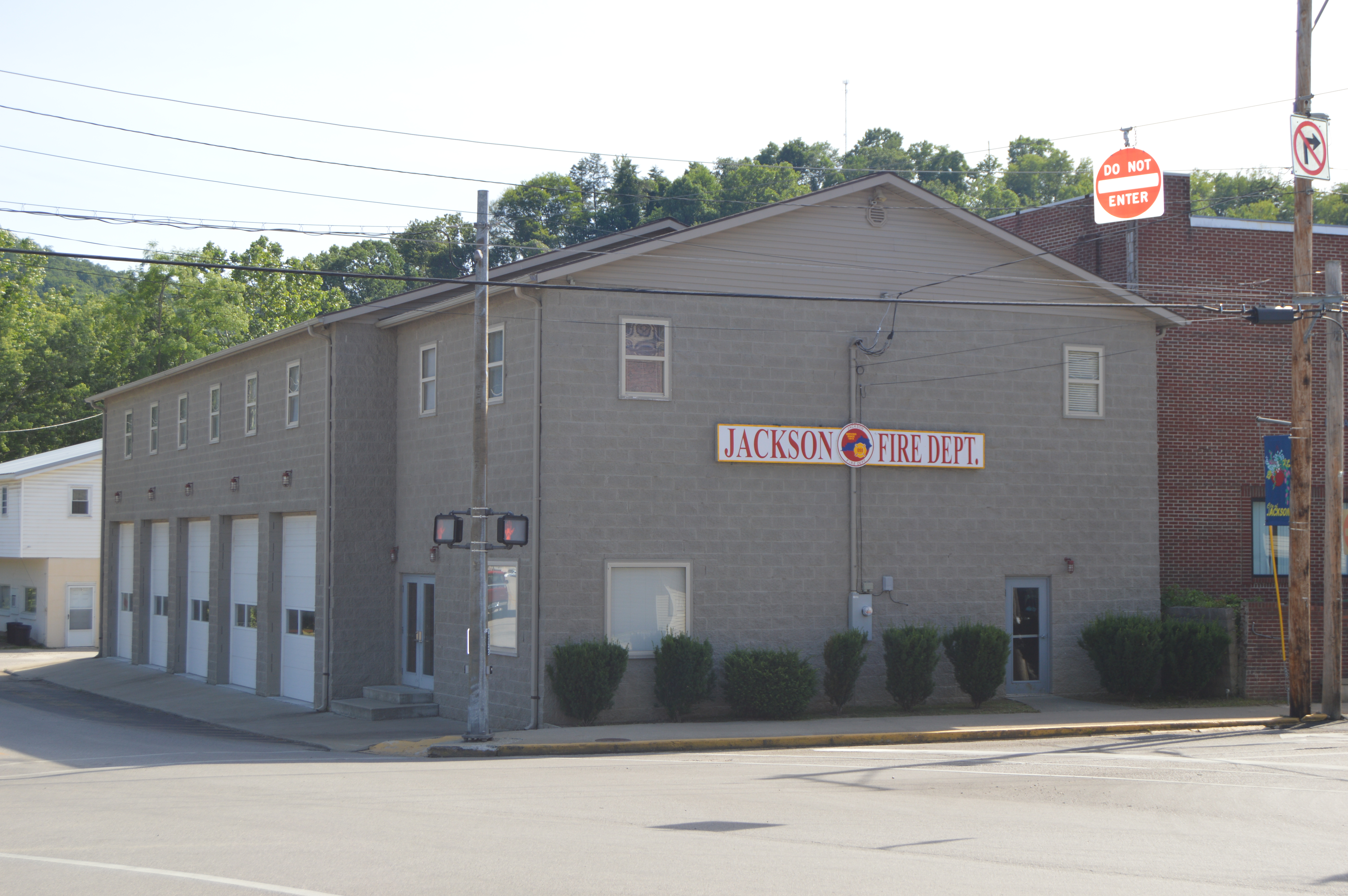
Photo of Jackson Fire Department building on site, from June 2014

The building appears to have been moved or destroyed.
