= Breathitt County, Kentucky =

County in Kentucky, United States

- County
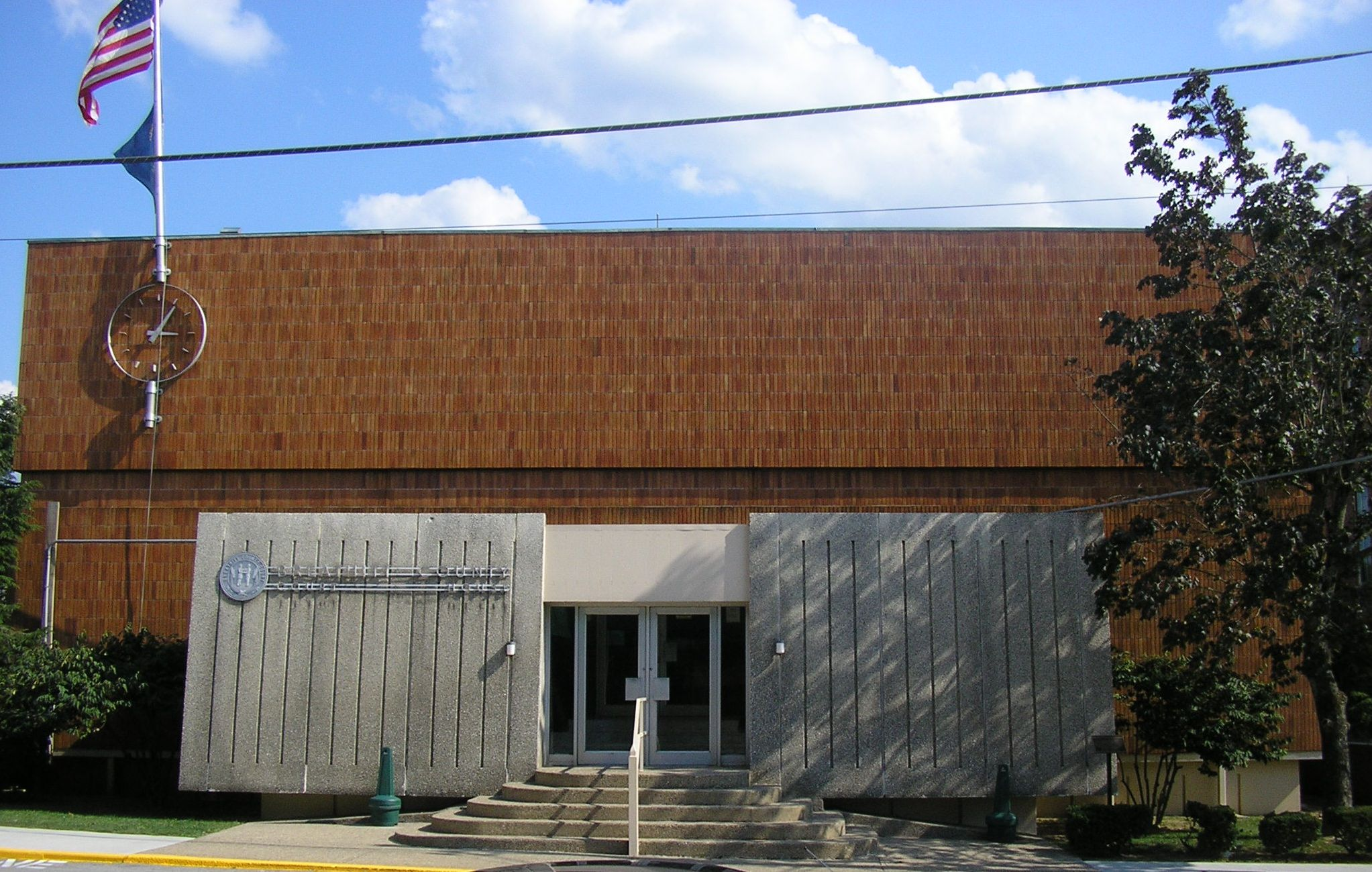
- Breathitt County Courthouse in Jackson

- Location within the U.S. state of Kentucky
- Coordinates: 37°31′N 83°19′W
- Country: United States
- State: Kentucky
- Founded: 1839
- Named for: John Breathitt
- Seat: Jackson
- Largest city: Jackson

Government
  - Judge/Executive: Jeff Noble (D)

Area
  - Total: 495 sq mi (1,280 km^{2})
  - Land: 492 sq mi (1,270 km^{2})
  - Water: 2.9 sq mi (7.5 km^{2}) 0.6%

Population (2020)
  - Total: 13,718
  - Estimate (2025): 12,558 ▼
  - Density: 27.9/sq mi (10.8/km^{2})
- Time zone: UTC−5 (Eastern)
  - Summer (DST): UTC−4 (EDT)
- Congressional district: 5th
- Website: breathittcounty.ky.gov

Breathitt County (/ˈbrɛˌθɪt/ BREH-thit) is a county located in the eastern portion of the U.S. state of Kentucky. As of the 2020 census, the population was 13,718. Its county seat is Jackson. The county was formed in 1839 and was named for John Breathitt, who was Governor of Kentucky from 1832 to 1834. Breathitt County was formerly a dry county, until a public vote in July 2016 passed, allowing alcohol sales.

== History ==
The area now encompassed by Kentucky's Breathitt County was first bounded in 1772, when all of what is now the state of Kentucky was in the frontier county of Fincastle County, Virginia. Fincastle was divided in 1776, with the western portion named Kentucky County, Virginia. In 1780, Virginia set aside all land in Kentucky County for soldiers who had served in the Revolutionary War. In 1780, Kentucky County was divided into 3 counties, Jefferson, Fayette, and Lincoln. Lincoln County was divided in 1799, with part becoming Knox County. In 1807, the Legislature partitioned the upper part of Knox to create Clay County. On February 6, 1839, a portion of Clay (along with portions of Estill and Perry counties) was partitioned off to create Breathitt County. It was named for Governor John Breathitt. The first people to actually settle on the land that became Breathitt County were Joseph Back (1745–1819), his wife Elizabeth Hoffman-Maggard (1755–1826), and their four children: Joseph Back Jr. (1773–1802); John Back (1774–1854); Mary Back (1777–1807); and Henry Back (1785–1871).

== Geography ==
According to the United States Census Bureau, the county has a total area of 495 square miles (1,280 km^{2}), of which 492 square miles (1,270 km^{2}) is land and 2.9 square miles (7.5 km^{2}) (0.6%) is water.

The North and Middle Forks of the Kentucky River pass through the county as the main water drainages.

=== Adjacent counties ===
- Wolfe County - northwest
- Magoffin County - northeast
- Knott County - east
- Perry County - southeast
- Owsley County - southwest
- Lee County - west

== Demographics ==
Historical population
Census	Pop.	Note	%±
1840	2,195		—
1850	3,785		72.4%
1860	4,980		31.6%
1870	5,672		13.9%
1880	7,742		36.5%
1890	8,705		12.4%
1900	14,322		64.5%
1910	17,540		22.5%
1920	20,614		17.5%
1930	21,143		2.6%
1940	23,946		13.3%
1950	19,964		−16.6%
1960	15,490		−22.4%
1970	14,221		−8.2%
1980	17,004		19.6%
1990	15,703		−7.7%
2000	16,100		2.5%
2010	13,878		−13.8%
2020	13,718		−1.2%
2025 (est.)	12,558	▼	−8.5%
US Decennial Census; 1790–1960 1900–1990; 1990–2000 2010–2020

Breathitt County, Kentucky – Racial composition Note: the US Census treats Hispanic/Latino as an ethnic category. This table excludes Latinos from the racial categories and assigns them to a separate category. Hispanics/Latinos may be of any race.
Race (NH = Non-Hispanic)	% 2020	% 2010	% 2000	Pop 2020	Pop 2010	Pop 2000
White alone (NH)	95%	97.8%	98.1%	13,038	13,575	15,797
Black alone (NH)	0.4%	0.3%	0.4%	57	43	62
American Indian alone (NH)	0.1%	0.1%	0.1%	11	12	14
Asian alone (NH)	0.3%	0.5%	0.3%	37	67	47
Pacific Islander alone (NH)	0.1%	0.1%	0%	11	12	4
Other race alone (NH)	0%	0.1%	0%	0	9	2
Multiracial (NH)	3.4%	0.5%	0.4%	471	71	68
Hispanic/Latino (any race)	0.7%	0.6%	0.7%	93	89	106

=== 2020 census ===
As of the 2020 census, the county had a population of 13,718. The median age was 42.7 years. 22.2% of residents were under the age of 18 and 18.3% of residents were 65 years of age or older. For every 100 females there were 99.0 males, and for every 100 females age 18 and over there were 94.7 males age 18 and over.

The most reported ancestries in 2020 were English (42.5%), Irish (5.1%), German (3.2%), and Scottish (1.4%).

The racial makeup of the county was 95.4% White, 0.4% Black or African American, 0.1% American Indian and Alaska Native, 0.3% Asian, 0.1% Native Hawaiian and Pacific Islander, 0.1% from some other race, and 3.7% from two or more races. Hispanic or Latino residents of any race comprised 0.7% of the population.

0.0% of residents lived in urban areas, while 100.0% lived in rural areas.

There were 5,716 households in the county, of which 29.0% had children under the age of 18 living with them and 30.9% had a female householder with no spouse or partner present. About 32.1% of all households were made up of individuals and 13.0% had someone living alone who was 65 years of age or older.

There were 6,551 housing units, of which 12.7% were vacant. Among occupied housing units, 74.8% were owner-occupied and 25.2% were renter-occupied. The homeowner vacancy rate was 1.6% and the rental vacancy rate was 7.7%.

=== 2000 census ===
As of the census of 2000, there were 16,100 people, 6,170 households, and 4,541 families in the county. The population density was 32 per square mile (12/km^{2}). There were 6,812 housing units at an average density of 14 per square mile (5.4/km^{2}). The racial makeup of the county was 98.69% White, 0.39% Black or African American, 0.09% Native American, 0.29% Asian, 0.02% Pacific Islander, 0.08% from other races, and 0.43% from two or more races. 0.66% of the population were Hispanic or Latino of any race.

There were 6,170 households, out of which 34.10% had children under the age of 18 living with them, 55.00% were married couples living together, 14.20% had a female householder with no husband present, and 26.40% were non-families. 23.80% of all households were made up of individuals, and 9.00% had someone living alone who was 65 years of age or older. The average household size was 2.54 and the average family size was 3.00.

The county population contained 25.50% under the age of 18, 10.00% from 18 to 24, 28.90% from 25 to 44, 24.00% from 45 to 64, and 11.50% who were 65 years of age or older. The median age was 36 years. For every 100 females there were 97.40 males. For every 100 females age 18 and over, there were 92.70 males.

The median income for a household in the county was $19,155, and the median income for a family was $23,721. Males had a median income of $26,208 versus $20,613 for females. The per capita income for the county was $11,044. About 28.10% of families and 33.20% of the population were below the poverty line, including 42.90% of those under age 18 and 26.80% of those age 65 or over.

== Politics ==
United States presidential election results for Breathitt County, Kentucky
Year	Republican		Democratic		Third party(ies)	
Year	No.	%	No.	%	No.	%
1880	330	29.10%	797	70.28%	7	0.62%
1884	459	34.08%	870	64.59%	18	1.34%
1888	505	43.61%	636	54.92%	17	1.47%
1892	566	36.42%	977	62.87%	11	0.71%
1896	776	38.92%	1,204	60.38%	14	0.70%
1900	850	34.92%	1,573	64.63%	11	0.45%
1904	829	34.66%	1,537	64.26%	26	1.09%
1908	1,620	50.33%	1,567	48.68%	32	0.99%
1912	910	30.34%	1,682	56.09%	407	13.57%
1916	1,584	43.09%	2,067	56.23%	25	0.68%
1920	2,464	47.09%	2,737	52.31%	31	0.59%
1924	1,708	37.59%	2,826	62.19%	10	0.22%
1928	2,309	43.35%	3,017	56.65%	0	0.00%
1932	1,371	23.23%	4,524	76.65%	7	0.12%
1936	1,790	30.96%	3,980	68.85%	11	0.19%
1940	1,602	28.66%	3,977	71.14%	11	0.20%
1944	1,230	29.40%	2,922	69.85%	31	0.74%
1948	957	22.38%	3,295	77.06%	24	0.56%
1952	1,381	28.99%	3,383	71.01%	0	0.00%
1956	2,423	42.71%	3,246	57.22%	4	0.07%
1960	1,996	37.64%	3,307	62.36%	0	0.00%
1964	669	12.43%	4,714	87.57%	0	0.00%
1968	1,361	29.09%	2,954	63.15%	363	7.76%
1972	1,846	40.65%	2,677	58.95%	18	0.40%
1976	1,014	22.16%	3,544	77.45%	18	0.39%
1980	1,532	27.69%	3,916	70.79%	84	1.52%
1984	2,855	45.25%	3,435	54.45%	19	0.30%
1988	2,149	38.51%	3,387	60.70%	44	0.79%
1992	1,303	24.42%	3,496	65.52%	537	10.06%
1996	1,058	23.11%	3,106	67.85%	414	9.04%
2000	2,084	41.08%	2,902	57.20%	87	1.71%
2004	2,542	42.77%	3,327	55.97%	75	1.26%
2008	2,671	53.10%	2,205	43.84%	154	3.06%
2012	3,318	66.25%	1,562	31.19%	128	2.56%
2016	3,991	69.55%	1,537	26.79%	210	3.66%
2020	4,265	75.34%	1,301	22.98%	95	1.68%
2024	4,036	78.86%	1,002	19.58%	80	1.56%

During the 20th century, Breathitt County was a Democratic stronghold typical of rural Appalachia, only voting Republican narrowly once. Starting in 1912, Breathitt County continuously voted for the Democratic presidential nominee, a streak that would last until the 2004 election. Since 2008, the county has voted for the Republican nominee each election by increasingly wide margins. Despite this, 79% of registered voters remain Democrats and Democrats still occupy all county offices.

In gubernatorial elections, Breathitt County has only voted for the Republican nominee on three occasions: 1907, 1919 and 2015.

=== Elected officials ===
Elected officials as of January 3, 2025
U.S. House	Hal Rogers (R)	KY 5
Ky. Senate	Brandon Smith (R)	30
Ky. House	Chris Fugate (R)	84

== Economy ==
=== Coal companies ===
- Arch Coal
- US Coal

== Education ==
=== K-12 education ===
There are two school districts in the county: Jackson Independent School District and Breathitt County School District. The former includes a portion of Jackson and some unincorporated areas, while the latter has the remainder of the city and county. The Jackson school district operates Jackson City School a single K-12 facility. The county school district operates several schools, including:

- Sebastian Elementary School(Formerly Sebastian Middle School) – Jackson, Kentucky (Opened 1970)
- Highland-Turner Elementary School – Canoe, Kentucky (Opened 1992)
- Breahitt Elementary School (Formerly LBJ Elementary)
- Breathitt County High School – Jackson, Kentucky (New School Opened 1982)

Private schools:

- Mount Carmel School – Vancleve
- Oakdale Christian Academy – Jackson
- Riverside Christian School – Lost Creek

=== Higher education ===
- Lees College Campus of Hazard Community and Technical College (part of the Kentucky Community and Technical College System) – Jackson, Kentucky
- Kentucky Mountain Bible College – Vancleve, Kentucky

=== Breathitt Area Technology Center ===
The Breathitt Area Technology Center serves both the Jackson Independent and the Breathitt County school districts. It is located on the campus of Breathitt County High School. The school is operated by the state of Kentucky. While most of the funding comes from the state, much of the equipment is purchased with federal Carl D. Perkins Vocational and Technical Education Act funds, which are aimed at advancing technical education.

The school is focused on technical education, offering these technical programs:

- Automotive Technology
- Construction Technology
- Electrical Technology
- Health Sciences
- Office Technology

=== UK Robinson Station ===
The community of Quicksand is the location for the University of Kentucky Robinson Station. This agriculture research facility is a pivotal asset in Breathitt County, furthering the scientific studies in the areas of agriculture and forestry.

== Health care ==
- Breathitt County Family Health Center, Jackson, Kentucky

Breathitt County health care providers were featured in a November 23, 2013, article in The Washington Post: "In Rural Kentucky, Health-Care Takes Back Seat as the Long-Uninsured Line Up". As of 2014 the county had the highest morbidity rate in the state of Kentucky.

== Communities ==
=== City ===
- Jackson (county seat)

=== Unincorporated communities ===
- Altro
- Bays
- Caney
- Canoe
- Chenowee
- Clayhole
- Cockrell Fork (on line between Breathitt and Perry Counties)
- Crockettsville
- Elkatawa
- Evanston
- Fishtrap
- Flintville
- Frozen/Frozen Creek
- Fugates Fork
- Guage
- Haddix
- Hardshell Caney
- Hayes Branch
- Leatherwood
- Lost Creek
- Morris Fork
- Ned
- Nix Branch
- Noble
- Noctor
- Oakdale
- Portsmouth
- Quicksand
- River Caney
- Riverside
- Rose Branch
- Rousseau
- Rowdy
- Saldee
- Sebastians Branch
- Shoulder Blade/Shoulderblade
- Smith Branch
- South Fork
- Stevenson
- Troublesome Creek
- Turners Creek
- Vancleve
- War Creek
- Watts
- Whick
- Wilstacy
- Wolf Coal

== Nature viewing ==
In the community of Southfork, there is a local elk viewing area where elk can be seen.

== Notable people ==
- Kim Davis, the Rowan County clerk known for her refusal to comply with a federal court order directing her to issue marriage licenses to same-sex couples, was born in Breathitt County.
- Jeffrey Reddick, writer for the Final Destination franchise, was born in Jackson.
- Sturgill Simpson, country music artist/singer was born in Jackson, the county seat of Breathitt County and spent much of his childhood there.
- Chad Warrix, member of the country music duo Halfway to Hazard

== See also ==
- National Register of Historic Places listings in Breathitt County, Kentucky
- Robinson Forest
