= Morris Fork, Kentucky =

Unincorporated community in Kentucky, United States

- Unincorporated community
- Location within Kentucky
- Coordinates: 37°22′57″N 83°30′58″W
- Country: United States
- State: Kentucky
- County: Breathitt
- Elevation: 860 ft (260 m)
- Time zone: UTC-5 (Eastern (EST))
  - Summer (DST): UTC-4 (EDT)
- Area code: 606
- GNIS feature ID: 514068

Morris Fork is an unincorporated community in Breathitt County, Kentucky. Morris Fork is 3.2 miles (5.1 km) northwest of Buckhorn. The Morris Fork Presbyterian Church and Community Center, which is listed on the National Register of Historic Places, is located in Morris Fork.
