= Oakdale Christian Academy =

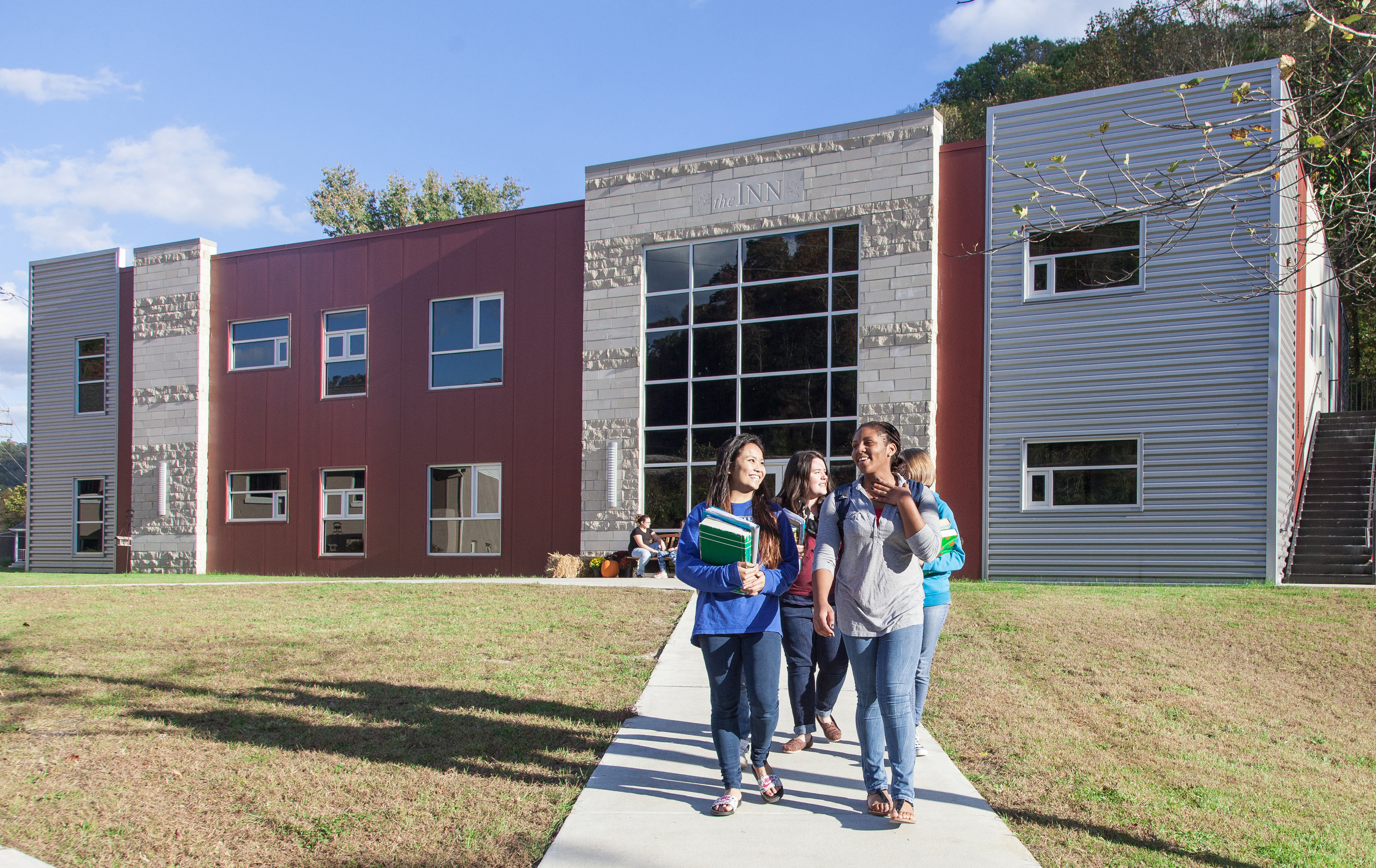

Location
- 5801 Beattyville Road; Jackson, Kentucky 41339; United States; 37°32′50.0″N 83°30′02.5″W

Information
- Former names: Oakdale Vocational School; Oakdale Christian High School
- Type: Private, boarding and day school
- Religious affiliation: Methodist
- Established: 1921
- Founder: Elizabeth E. O'Connor
- NCES School ID: 00516658
- President: Daniel Roach
- Teaching staff: 7.6 (on an FTE basis)
- Grades: 7–12
- Gender: Co-educational
- Enrollment: 60 (2017-2018)
- Student to teacher ratio: 7.9
- Colors: Blue, Green, and White
- Athletics conference: Kentucky Christian School Athletic Association
- Nickname: Wildcats
- Accreditation: Southern Association of Colleges and Schools
- Website: www.oakdalechristian.org

Oakdale Christian Academy is a private, Methodist, co-educational boarding and day school in Jackson, Kentucky, United States. It was established in 1921 by Elizabeth E. O’Connor.

== History ==
Oakdale was founded in 1921 by Elizabeth E O'Connor in a one-room elementary school for local children. It was originally called Oakdale Vocational School, and served needy children. It was later renamed Oakdale Christian High School.

In 1968, the Free Methodist Church of North America gave the governance and authority of Oakdale Christian High School to an independent board of trustees. This occurred as the Free Methodist Church's priorities shifted from domestic to foreign missions.

Oakdale is accredited by the Southern Association of Colleges and Schools (SACS) and the Association of Christian Schools International (ACSI).
