= WMTC-FM =

WMTC
- Vancleve, Kentucky; United States
- Frequency: 99.9 MHz
- Branding: Mountain Gospel

Programming
- Format: Southern gospel / Christian talk
- Affiliations: Salem Media Group; Moody Radio

Ownership
- Owner: Kentucky Mountain Bible College
- Sister stations: WBFC (AM)

History
- First air date: January 1, 1991
- Call sign meaning: Winning Men to Christ

Technical information
- Licensing authority: FCC
- Facility ID: 34241
- Class: A
- ERP: 6,000 watts
- HAAT: 100 meters (330 ft)
- Transmitter coordinates: 37°36′12″N 83°26′39″W

Links
- Public license information: Public file; LMS
- Webcast: Listen Now
- Website: www.mountaingospel.org

WMTC (99.9 FM) is a Christian radio station, licensed to Vancleve, Kentucky, United States. The station is currently owned by the Kentucky Mountain Bible College and features programming from Salem Media Group and Moody Radio. WMTC's format consists of Southern gospel music, as well as Christian talk and teaching programs such as Revive our Hearts with Nancy DeMoss Wolgemuth, Focus on the Family, and Unshackled!, as well as children's programming such as Adventures in Odyssey.
