= Quicksand, Kentucky =

Unincorporated community in Kentucky, United States

Quicksand
- Unincorporated community
- Location within the state of Kentucky Quicksand (the United States)
- Coordinates: 37°31′44″N 83°20′42″W
- Country: United States
- State: Kentucky
- County: Breathitt
- Elevation: 810 ft (250 m)
- Time zone: UTC-5 (Eastern (EST))
  - Summer (DST): UTC-4 (EDT)
- ZIP codes: 41363
- GNIS feature ID: 501479

Topographic map

Quicksand is an unincorporated community located in Breathitt County, Kentucky, United States. This small community is along the North Fork of the Kentucky River, directly across the river from where Quicksand Creek flows into the river.

The community post office closed in 1996. Prior to that, its population had been reported in 1987 at roughly 100.

Regarding the community's 19th-century naming, postmaster Rosa Lea Davis told the Los Angeles Times, "a man was returning on his horse, and as the horse neared the center of the river, the horse began to sink. The man cried out for help. People ran to the river bank, but before they could get to him, the man and horse sank from sight, never to be seen again." Despite the story and the location's name, no actual quicksand is known to exist in the area.

Historians and Board-Certified genealogists have proven that Joseph Back (1745–1819) was the first member of the Back (or Bach) family to settle in Quicksand, and that he was the great-grandson of Johann Christoph Bach, who was a cousin to Johann Sebastian Bach, the famous classical musician. This has been documented in many books, including The Bach (Back) Family from Southeastern Kentucky by Dr. Mary Back Simpson, The Kentucky by Dr. Thomas D. Clark, and In the Land of Breathitt by the Kentucky Writer's Project (and the WPA).

== History ==
Joseph Back (1745–1819) was the son of Johann Heinrich Bach, who was the grandson of Johann Christoph Bach. Johann Heinrich had sailed, from Thuringia, Germany, to America, on the ship Lydia, in 1740, with his brother, Johann William Bach, and his cousin, Johann Jacob Bach. The clerk spelled their names phonetically on the passenger list. All three men were listed, as taking their oaths together, later that day, at the Custom House. Upon arrival, Johann Heinrich Bach simplified the spelling of his name to be John Henry Back, so that other colonists could more easily pronounce it and spell it, which was a common practice among immigrants. He settled along Crooked Creek (aka Meander Run), in the part of Orange County, Virginia that later became Culpeper County in 1749, and Madison County in 1792. He owned 786 acres there (next door to Henry Field). He was a well-known and highly respected millwright, building and selling gristmills, all around that area. He had three sons: John Back (1738–1794), who married Margaret Hoffman; Henry Back (1740–1809), who married Margaret's sister, Elizabeth Hoffman; and Joseph Back (1745–1819), who married Elizabeth Hoffman-Maggard (not related to those two Hoffman sisters).

In 1791, John Henry Back's son, Joseph Back (1745–1819), and his wife, Elizabeth Hoffman-Maggard Back, who had been orphaned as a child and then raised by the Maggard family, left Virginia and migrated here, along with their four children: Joseph Back Jr. (1773–1802); John Back (1774–1854); Mary Back (1777–1807); and Henry Back (1785–1871). Samuel Maggard (1774–1853), who was their son John's best friend, went with them. Joseph also brought their old Family Bible (a Catechism) with them. That Bible documented their family's genealogy, and is now on display at the Breathitt County Public Library, in Jackson. Numerous other heirlooms from Joseph Back's family are now on display at the Breathitt County Museum, in Jackson, including his survey chains, and his wife's small spinning wheel.

When Joseph Back's wife Elizabeth Hoffman-Maggard Back died, in 1826, she was buried along the Cumberland River. The Maggard Cemetery was later built around her grave because of her close connections to the Maggard family. Sadly, her gravestone was illegally removed, in 1988, and replaced with one depicting her sister-in-law, who had a similar name.

Joseph Back had tried to buy land near Quicksand, back in 1782, through a Treasury Warrant, for 791 acres (Virginia Patent Series #4414.0). Joseph "assigned" (sold) half of that Warrant to his friend Stephen Jett (1735–1793). However, their 791 acres was later stolen from them by Jacob Myers. That's why Joseph Back never owned any land in Kentucky. (Jacob Myers later divided up that 791-acre parcel into several smaller parcels, which he sold; curiously, one of those smaller parcels was later owned by another man named Joseph Back.)

Joseph and Elizabeth's son John Back (1774–1853) married Catherine Robertson, and in 1836, John and his son Joseph bought 2,500 acres of land in Quicksand, for $2,000 in gold. That land extended, from Quicksand, up Quicksand Creek, on both sides of the creek, for eight miles. Two generations later, John's grandson, Miles Back (1853–1940), was said to own over 20,000 acres, in and around Quicksand. His big, two-story house was up on the hill, in Quicksand, overlooking the North Fork of the Kentucky River. Miles was married three times, and he had at least twenty children.

Starting in the early 1900s, some members of this family went back to using the original spelling of their last name (Bach), while others maintained the simplified spelling (Back). That is why both spellings are used within the family.

In 1908, Miles sold 15,000 acres to Fred Mowbray and Edward Robinson, who operated a lumber company in Cincinnati. They built a massive sawmill along the river, in Quicksand, just down the hill from Miles Back's house; it was called "The Mowbray-Robinson Lumber Company." From about 1909 until about 1922, their lumber company cut down all of the old hardwood forests around there. They sold the lumber to the Singer Sewing Machine Company, in South Bend, Indiana, which manufactured wooden cabinets for their sewing machines. Singer made about 10,000 sewing machine cabinets a day.

However, clear-cutting all those trees created an environmental disaster, in and around Quicksand. In 1923, Fred Mowbray and Edward Robinson donated all of that devastated land to the University of Kentucky, forcing the college and the taxpayers to pay, to replant the trees, and to attempt to fix all the damage. The university established The Robinson Substation, on land donated by Miles Back, to do that. The Substation was also located just down the hill from Miles' house, along the river. It was on the other side of the Quicksand Bridge, from where the sawmill had been. The people at the Substation replanted some of the trees, and they also worked to improve the agricultural output in the community. The Substation is still in operation today, although the name has been changed to The Robinson Center.
