= Jackson Independent School District =

School district in Kentucky, United States

Address
- 940 Highland Avenue Jackson, Kentucky, 41339; United States
- Coordinates: 37.55305°N 83.37954°W

District information
- Type: Public
- Grades: Pre-K through 12
- Superintendent: Wayne Sizemore

Students and staff
- District mascot: Tiger
- Colors: Purple, Gold and White

Other information
- Website: JCS website

Jackson Independent School District is a school district serving grades pre-k through 12. It is located in the hills of Eastern Kentucky, in Jackson, Kentucky, USA.

The elementary school portion is named after Herbert W. Spencer, after it was rebuilt in the 1960s when the original elementary school caught fire. Though, locally, it's referred to as Jackson City School.
