= Vancleve, Kentucky =

Unincorporated community in Kentucky, United States

- Unincorporated community
- Location within Kentucky
- Coordinates: 37°37′39″N 83°24′49″W
- Country: United States
- State: Kentucky
- County: Breathitt
- Elevation: 718 ft (219 m)
- Time zone: UTC-5 (Eastern (EST))
  - Summer (DST): UTC-4 (EDT)
- ZIP code: 41385
- Area code: 606
- GNIS feature ID: 509273

Vancleve is an unincorporated community in Breathitt County, Kentucky, at the junction of Kentucky Route 15 and Kentucky Route 205 5.4 miles (8.7 km) north-northwest of Jackson. Vancleve has a post office with ZIP code 41385, which opened on November 6, 1903. Kentucky Mountain Bible College is in Vancleve.
