= Kentucky Mountain Bible College =

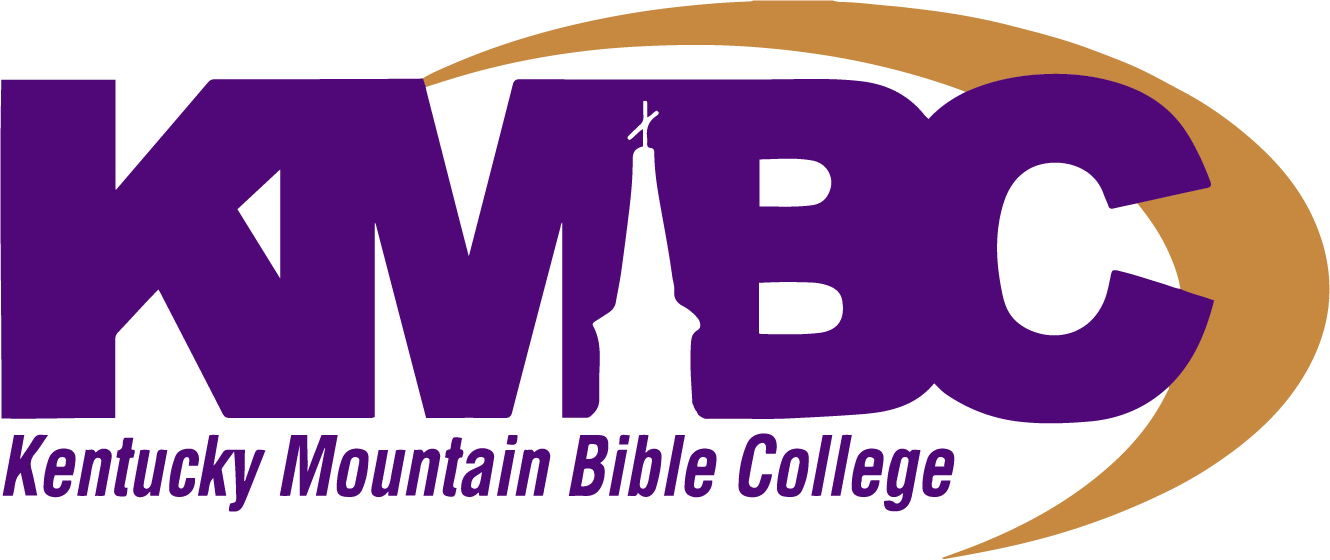
- KMBC Logo
- Former names: Kentucky Mountain Bible Institute, Vancleve Bible School
- Motto: Training Holiness Leaders
- Type: Private Bible college
- Established: 1931
- Affiliations: Kentucky Mountain Holiness Association, Mount Carmel High School, National Association of Independent Colleges and Universities
- Religious affiliation: Kentucky Mountain Holiness Association
- President: Robert D. Pocai
- Academic staff: 17
- Administrative staff: 30
- Students: 89
- Location: Vancleve, Kentucky, United States; 37.60356°N 83.43894°W
- Campus: Rural
- Colors: Purple, Gold, and White
- Website: www.kmbc.edu

Kentucky Mountain Bible College (KMBC) is a private Holiness bible college in Vancleve, Kentucky, United States. It is a ministry of the Kentucky Mountain Holiness Association. The college claims that over 70% of its graduates have entered Christian ministry, including speakers, missionaries, and pastors in over 60 countries worldwide.

== History ==
=== 1931-1939: Origins and destruction of first campus ===
Kentucky Mountain Bible College was initially established by Lela G. McConnell and Martha Archer in 1931. as an offshoot of the nearby Mount Carmel High School. Mr. and Mrs. W. H. Pelfrey donated the land, which had been at one time used by a defunct coal mining company as a commissary, approximately three miles from the present site. Because of the "young people with the call of God upon them" who "felt the need of further training beyond the high school work in order to fit them better for missionary work", the Kentucky Mountain Bible Institute, signed as the "Vancleve Church School", was established in order to train young people from the Appalachian foothills of Eastern Kentucky in the areas of ministry and missions.

After the remodeling of the commissary, Kentucky Mountain Bible Institute (KMBI) opened in October, 1931 with Martha Archer as its first principal and teacher, Lela McConnell as a second teacher, and just two students. KMBI initially offered a two-year Bible course. After the first semester, additional faculty and students were added. A men's dormitory was completed in 1937. In 1938, KMBI expanded to a three-year program which included practical studies. The program was a full Bible course offering theology, psychology, ethics, church history, English, speech, Greek, homiletics, instrumental music, and vocal music.

On February 5, 1939, heavy snow and rains caused the river to rise and back up, flooding KMBI's buildings. The bridge that connected KMBI with Mount Carmel had also been washed away. Although the WPA appropriated funds to rebuild the bridges, KMHA workers rebuilt their own bridge within 6 weeks. The other bridges remained closed for almost two years.

At 3:30 am on July 5, 1939, a cloudburst on Frozen Creek caused a flash flood that destroyed the original school, as well 44 nearby homes, 60 barns, livestock, and killed 54 men and women, including several KMBI students and faculty. The effort to recover and bury bodies lasted for weeks, with one student being found 50 miles downstream. This was the first flood on record that had come rushing down the river, as the other floods had been backups which were mostly still water. Both of KMBI's buildings, the old commissary and the dormitory, were destroyed. Of the buildings' sixteen occupants, nine drowned. These included staff member Mr. Horace Myers, his three children Titus, Philip, and Lela Grace, students Elsie Booth and Christine Holman, and three guests of the Myers. Mrs. Myers alone survived her family.

=== 1939-1948: Second campus and rebuilding ===
On 20 October 1939, three and a half months after the flood, the school re-opened at a new site donated by Mr. and Mrs. Fred Fletcher, and his sister, Laura. Located on a hill and above the flood plain, the new three-acre campus featured only a half-finished building with 18 students when it opened. This building was developed into the modern Administration building and girls' dorm. Growth and building continued at a feverish pace, starting with the Myers Chapel in 1940, named for the drowned teacher who had given of himself to KMBI. Swauger Hall was constructed right before Brengle Hall, and by 1945, the campus was well-developed.

=== 1948-1970: Continued expansion ===
Archer Auditorium was begun in the summer of 1961 and was ready for graduation classes for 1962.

=== 1981-1993: Eldon Neihof and accreditation ===
In 1989 Candidate Status was granted for institutional accreditation with the Accrediting Association of Bible Colleges (now Association for Biblical Higher Education). In 1994, KMBC was granted membership with AABC.

=== 1993-Present ===
With the recognition as an accredited school by the AABC, KMBC began offering a Bachelor of Arts in Religion and an Associate in Arts in Bible/Biblical Studies.

Several facilities including the Davis Memorial Building, which serves as a library, the renovation of the basement in Brengle Hall, the addition of the Coffeehouse underneath Swauger, and the new Helen Matthews Luce Chapel. The current president, Robert D. Pocai, became president in 2022.

In 2003, the college objected to a phone number it had been assigned with the prefix 666, which is associated in Christian tradition with Satan. The local phone company changed the prefix to another newly available exchange.

The college was granted an exception to Title IX in 2017 which allows it to legally discriminate against LGBT students for religious reasons. All faculty and staff must yearly affirm that they will avoid the homosexual lifestyle.

== Academics ==
KMBC offers three degrees: an associate degree in Biblical Studies, a bachelor's degree in Religion, and a Masters of Ministry.

== Campus ==
The campus of Kentucky Mountain Bible College is located on a hilltop off of Kentucky route 541 in Vancleve, KY. There have been numerous additions in recent years, the most recent of which is the Helen Matthews Luce Chapel & Fine Arts Building.

=== Gibson Library ===
The Gibson Library is housed in the Davis Memorial Building. It has over 30,000 items including books, CDs, DVDs, videos, sheet music, song flashcards, and Sunday school supplies.

== Student life ==
Recreation in the area includes hiking, rock climbing, canoeing, and other outdoor activities.

A student-led social committee organizes social events throughout the school year.

Chapel takes place at Kentucky Mountain Bible College three times per week (Tuesday, Thursday, and Friday). Student chapel attendance is expected. In addition to chapel, undergraduate students are required to choose a local church to attend every Sunday.

Voluntary group personal discipleship and private mentoring is available to all students.
