= Jackson, Kentucky =

- City
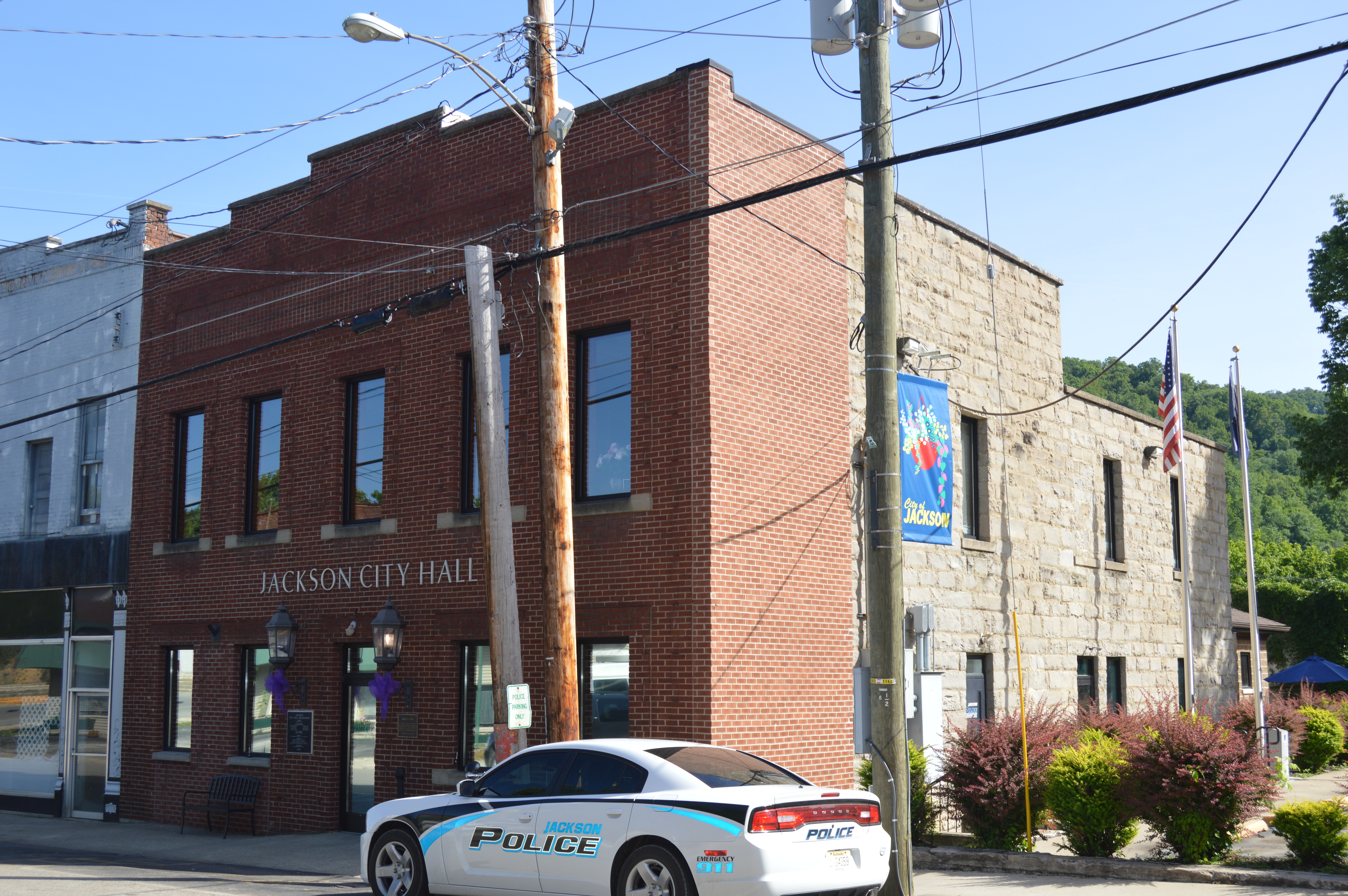
- Jackson City Hall

- Location of Jackson in Breathitt County, Kentucky

- Location within Kentucky Location within the United States
- Coordinates: 37°33′11″N 83°23′18″W
- Country: United States
- State: Kentucky
- County: Breathitt
- Established: 1839
- Incorporated: 1845
- Reincorporated: 1890
- Named for: Andrew Jackson

Area
  - Total: 2.67 sq mi (6.92 km^{2})
  - Land: 2.51 sq mi (6.50 km^{2})
  - Water: 0.16 sq mi (0.42 km^{2})
- Elevation: 774 ft (236 m)

Population (2020)
  - Total: 2,237
  - Estimate (2022): 2,157
  - Density: 891.8/sq mi (344.32/km^{2})
- Time zone: UTC−5 (Eastern (EST))
  - Summer (DST): UTC−4 (EDT)
- ZIP codes: 41307, 41339
- Area code: 606
- FIPS code: 21-39952
- GNIS feature ID: 0495097
- Website: cityofjacksonky.org

Jackson is a home rule-class city in Breathitt County, Kentucky, United States, and its county seat. The population was 2,237 at the 2020 census. It was the home of the Jackson Academy, which became Lees College.

== History ==
Upon the creation of Breathitt County in 1839, local landowner Simon Cockrell Sr. donated 10 acres (4.0 ha) to serve as its seat of government. The community was originally known as Breathitt, Breathitt Town, or Breathitt Court House after the county, but upon its incorporation as a city by the Kentucky Assembly in 1843, it was renamed Jackson to honor former U.S. president Andrew Jackson.

Local feuds led the national press to publish stories about Jackson and "Bloody Breathitt". In fact, state troops were dispatched twice in the 1870s and again in 1903 – after the assassination of U.S. Commissioner James B. Marcum on the courthouse steps – to restore order.

The Kentucky Union Railroad reached the city in 1891, and Jackson boomed until the Louisville and Nashville Railroad continued the line on to Hazard in 1912. A fire on Halloween, 1913, burned down much of the town.

== Geography ==
Jackson is located at 37°33′11″N 83°23′18″W (37.553012, −83.388249). The city is nestled in the heart of the Cumberland Plateau of the Appalachian Mountains, with the downtown located on the north bank of the North Fork of the Kentucky River. To limit flooding, the Kentucky River was redirected in 1963 by way of a small cut-through through the mountain, and its former channel, a river meander, was left behind as Panbowl Lake, now a prime attraction for fishermen.

According to the United States Census Bureau, Jackson has a total area of 2.7 square miles (6.9 km^{2}), of which 2.5 square miles (6.5 km^{2}) is land and 0.15 square miles (0.4 km^{2}), or 6.11%, is water.

=== Climate ===
The climate in this area is characterized by relatively moderate temperatures and evenly distributed precipitation throughout the year. The Köppen climate classification places the city in the humid subtropical zone, which is abbreviated as Cfa. The normal monthly mean temperature ranges from 34.9 °F (1.6 °C) in January to 75.4 °F (24.1 °C) in July. On average, there are 17 days where temperatures remain at or below freezing and 15 days with highs at or above 90 °F (32 °C) per year. In addition, although the area falls under USDA hardiness zone 6b, the record longest streak without 0 °F (−18 °C) lows occurred from February 6, 1996, to January 15, 2009 (12 years, 344 days). The highest recorded temperature was 104 °F (40 °C) on June 29, 2012, and the lowest recorded temperature was −18 °F (−28 °C) on January 19, 1994, and January 20 and 21, 1985.

Precipitation averages 48.3 inches (1,230 mm) annually, falling on an average 144 days, and the wettest month by normal rainfall is May. Normal winter snowfall is 23.5 inches (60 cm), though, as is typical in areas in the humid subtropical zone, snow cover does not remain for long, as there is an average of only 18 days with at least 1 inch (2.5 cm) of snow cover.

Climate data for Jackson, Kentucky (Julian Carroll Airport, 1,381 ft or 421 m AMSL, 37°35′29″N 83°18′52″W), 1991–2020 normals, extremes 1981–present
Month	Jan	Feb	Mar	Apr	May	Jun	Jul	Aug	Sep	Oct	Nov	Dec	Year
Record high °F (°C)	78 (26)	80 (27)	87 (31)	92 (33)	91 (33)	104 (40)	101 (38)	101 (38)	98 (37)	97 (36)	84 (29)	79 (26)	104 (40)
Mean daily maximum °F (°C)	44.2 (6.8)	48.8 (9.3)	58.0 (14.4)	69.2 (20.7)	75.7 (24.3)	82.2 (27.9)	85.0 (29.4)	84.4 (29.1)	79.0 (26.1)	68.8 (20.4)	57.4 (14.1)	47.6 (8.7)	66.7 (19.3)
Daily mean °F (°C)	35.8 (2.1)	39.7 (4.3)	47.8 (8.8)	58.2 (14.6)	65.6 (18.7)	72.6 (22.6)	75.7 (24.3)	74.9 (23.8)	69.1 (20.6)	58.7 (14.8)	48.1 (8.9)	39.7 (4.3)	57.2 (14.0)
Mean daily minimum °F (°C)	27.4 (−2.6)	30.5 (−0.8)	37.6 (3.1)	47.3 (8.5)	55.6 (13.1)	62.9 (17.2)	66.5 (19.2)	65.3 (18.5)	59.1 (15.1)	48.5 (9.2)	38.8 (3.8)	31.8 (−0.1)	47.6 (8.7)
Record low °F (°C)	−18 (−28)	−8 (−22)	7 (−14)	20 (−7)	30 (−1)	44 (7)	52 (11)	45 (7)	34 (1)	26 (−3)	13 (−11)	−13 (−25)	−18 (−28)
Average precipitation inches (mm)	3.96 (101)	4.06 (103)	4.71 (120)	4.54 (115)	5.17 (131)	5.25 (133)	5.10 (130)	4.26 (108)	3.42 (87)	3.45 (88)	3.50 (89)	4.47 (114)	51.89 (1,318)
Average snowfall inches (cm)	7.4 (19)	6.7 (17)	4.0 (10)	0.4 (1.0)	0.0 (0.0)	0.0 (0.0)	0.0 (0.0)	0.0 (0.0)	0.0 (0.0)	0.1 (0.25)	0.7 (1.8)	4.1 (10)	23.4 (59)
Average precipitation days (≥ 0.01 in)	14.4	13.8	14.4	13.2	13.8	12.7	12.6	10.5	8.2	9.5	11.0	13.9	148.0
Average snowy days (≥ 0.1 in)	6.3	5.6	3.3	0.5	0.0	0.0	0.0	0.0	0.0	0.1	1.1	4.7	21.6
Source: NOAA

== Demographics ==
Historical population
Census	Pop.	Note	%±
1870	54		—
1880	88		63.0%
1900	941		—
1910	1,346		43.0%
1920	1,503		11.7%
1930	2,109		40.3%
1940	2,099		−0.5%
1950	1,978		−5.8%
1960	1,852		−6.4%
1970	1,887		1.9%
1980	2,651		40.5%
1990	2,466		−7.0%
2000	2,490		1.0%
2010	2,231		−10.4%
2020	2,237		0.3%
2022 (est.)	2,157		−3.6%
U.S. Decennial Census

=== 2020 census ===
As of the 2020 census, Jackson had a population of 2,237. The median age was 42.7 years. 21.9% of residents were under the age of 18 and 20.6% of residents were 65 years of age or older. For every 100 females there were 86.4 males, and for every 100 females age 18 and over there were 80.4 males age 18 and over.

0.0% of residents lived in urban areas, while 100.0% lived in rural areas.

There were 998 households in Jackson, of which 26.9% had children under the age of 18 living in them. Of all households, 32.2% were married-couple households, 21.4% were households with a male householder and no spouse or partner present, and 42.0% were households with a female householder and no spouse or partner present. About 40.6% of all households were made up of individuals and 15.6% had someone living alone who was 65 years of age or older.

There were 1,145 housing units, of which 12.8% were vacant. The homeowner vacancy rate was 3.3% and the rental vacancy rate was 11.0%.

Racial composition as of the 2020 census
Race	Number	Percent
White	2,155	96.3%
Black or African American	9	0.4%
American Indian and Alaska Native	4	0.2%
Asian	20	0.9%
Native Hawaiian and Other Pacific Islander	1	0.0%
Some other race	7	0.3%
Two or more races	41	1.8%
Hispanic or Latino (of any race)	13	0.6%

=== Demographic estimates ===
Data USA reported that Jackson's median household income increased from $30,898 in 2019 to $32,644 in 2020, a 5.65% increase.

== Arts and culture ==
Jackson is home to numerous festivals. The Breathitt County Honey Festival takes place annually (since 1978) during the Labor Day Weekend. It begins on the Thursday before Labor Day and runs through Labor Day. Breathitt County Heritage Festival takes place in conjunction with the July 4th celebration with Pig Out in the Park, the city's Independence Day celebration. Downtown Christmas includes a parade and festivities held around the first weekend of December.

== Education ==
=== Primary and secondary ===
Much of the city is in the Jackson Independent Schools school district, which operates Jackson City School, an elementary, middle and high school combined.

The remainder of the city is in the Breathitt County School District. Schools relevant to the city include Breathitt Elementary School, Eugene Sebastian Elementary School and Breathitt County High School in Jackson.

There is a private school, Oakdale Christian Academy. There is also a vocational school, Breathitt County Area Technology Center on the campus of Breathitt County High School; the vocational school serves both Breathitt County Schools and Jackson Independent Schools.

=== Post-secondary ===
- Hazard Community and Technical College, Lees College Campus
- Morehead State University at Jackson – Breathitt County Skills Center
- Kentucky Mountain Bible College – located in Vancleve

=== Educational Centers ===
- Breathitt County Museum – currently located in the Senior Citizens Center on the second floor. Through the use of grant money the defunct Breathitt County Jail has been partially renovated to host the museum, but is yet to be completed.
- Breathitt County Public Library – located on College Avenue in Jackson.

== Transportation ==
=== Highways ===
- KY 15 The highway goes north to Campton and the Mountain Parkway and south to Hazard and the Hal Rogers Parkway. It is the main artery into the city and, currently, it is being relocated and changed to four lanes around and inside the city. It has been locally named (within the county) as the Breathitt County Veterans Highway.
- KY 30 The highway goes east to Salyersville and west to Booneville. It merges with KY 15 (at the present time) throughout most of the city. The west end is known, locally, as Booneville Road.
- KY 52 The highway's eastern terminus starts in the city of Jackson at the intersection with KY 30 and heads west towards Beattyville. It is locally known as Beattyville Road.
- KY 205 The highway goes north to the Mountain Parkway by way of Lee City in Wolfe County and eventually to West Liberty in Morgan County. The highway's southern terminus starts at the intersection of KY 15. Recently, an old section of KY 15 was annexed to the highway, and it is possible, once more of the re-routed KY 15 is finished, that it could annex more of the old KY 15 sections.
- KY 1812 -Not a Primary State Highway – The highway goes north to Campton and south to intersect and end near the KY 15 and KY 30 junction in Jackson. In the north, it connects with KY 205 and follows it until it intersects with the new section of KY 15; it follows KY 15 for a mile and then splits only to intersects KY 15 in Jackson once more; it then breaks away only to connect (partially) with Main Street and then heads south. It is part of what was once the original KY 15 when it was built in 1925. It can be a winding and curvy road in many places with a few hairpin turns as well. It is known locally by different names depending on which road it intersects or what section. i.e. Old Quicksand Rd., Broadway, College Ave, Brown St., Main Street, Washington Ave., Panbowl Rd., and so on.

=== Airports ===
Julian Carroll Airport is a publicly owned airport off KY 30. It is home to the National Weather Service Forecast Office that oversees most of the eastern part of the state.

=== Railroads ===
CSX is a freight and minerals only line that goes north to Beattyville and eventually to Winchester and south to Hazard. Before CSX owned the line, it was part of the L&N Railway as a passenger and freight line. Before that, it was owned by the defunct Lexington and Eastern Railway Company as a passenger and freight line. The old Jackson Depot and Freight Station located in the South Jackson section on Armory Drive was torn down in the late 1980s.

== Notable people ==
- Jay Huguely, television producer of Magnum PI
- Daniel Noble, Medal of Honor recipient for his service during the American Civil War
- Jeffrey Reddick, screenwriter of Final Destination
- Marea Stamper, DJ, producer, and musician under the stage name the Blessed Madonna
- Willie Sandlin, Medal of Honor recipient for his service during World War I
- Sturgill Simpson, country singer
- Chad Warrix, country singer of Halfway to Hazard
- The family of JD Vance, current vice president of the United States, and author of Hillbilly Elegy, was from Jackson, "the spiritual mountain home of the Vances." Vance also spent summers there growing up.
