= Kentucky Route 80 =

Highway in Kentucky, United States

Kentucky Route 80
- KY 80 highlighted in red

Route information
- Maintained by KYTC
- Length: 483.550 mi (778.198 km)

Major junctions
- West end: KY 58 / KY 123 in Columbus
- I-69 in Mayfield; I-24 near Cadiz; I-169 in Hopkinsville; I-165 in Bowling Green; US 31W in Bowling Green; I-65 in Oakland; US 31E in Glasgow; US 27 in Somerset; I-75 in London; US 23 / Corridor B in Watergap
- East end: SR 80 east of Elkhorn City

Location
- Country: United States
- State: Kentucky
- Counties: Hickman, Carlisle, Graves, Calloway, Marshall, Trigg, Christian, Todd, Logan, Warren, Barren, Metcalfe, Adair, Russell, Casey, Pulaski, Laurel, Clay, Leslie, Perry, Knott, Floyd, Pike

Highway system
- Kentucky State Highway System; Interstate; US; State; Parkways
← KY 79	→ KY 81

Kentucky Route 80 (KY 80) is a 483.55-mile-long (778.20 km) state highway in the southern part of the U.S. state of Kentucky. The route originates on the state's western border at Columbus in Hickman County and stretches across the southern portion of the state, terminating southeast of Elkhorn City on the Virginia state line. It is the longest Kentucky State Highway, though the official distance as listed in route logs is much less due to multiple concurrencies with U.S. Route 68 (US 68) and US 23.

The route was split into two segments from 2003 to November 2009. Construction and relocation of KY 80 in Graves, Calloway, and Marshall counties during this time caused the route to be split. A new, four-laned 8.5-mile (13.7 km) section of KY 80 opened in Calloway County on November 25, 2009. The route is now a four-lane divided highway from Mayfield to Bowling Green after the widening to four lanes from Canton to Cadiz was completed in 2020.

== Route description ==
=== Jackson Purchase region ===
From Columbus, the road passes through Hickman, Carlisle, and Graves counties to Mayfield. Before 2003, the road passed through Mayfield and into Marshall County before converging with US 68 in Aurora. The two-lane segment of former KY 80 from Mayfield to Aurora now has two separate designations. From Mayfield to Brewers in Marshall County, the road retains its former co-designation as KY 58. The segment from Brewers to Aurora is now designated as KY 402.

From Mayfield, KY 80 travels along a four-lane corridor into Calloway County and on to the northern outskirts of Murray. The route continues through eastern Calloway County and into Marshall County before converging with US 68 near the eastern terminus of KY 402 in Aurora.

=== Concurrency with U.S. 68 ===
From Aurora, it follows US 68 through Trigg County, and dissects the Land Between the Lakes National Recreation Area. The two routes then makes their way through Christian, Todd, and Logan counties to Bowling Green (Warren County).

From Bowling Green through Glasgow to Edmonton, Kentucky Route 80 remains overlapped with US 68 through eastern Warren, Barren and Metcalfe Counties until the two routes split just north of downtown Edmonton. KY 80 is part of the Kentucky Scenic Byways system for its entire concurrency with US 68.

=== Glasgow to Somerset ===
From Glasgow to Somerset, KY 80 is paralleled (and largely supplanted) by the Louie B. Nunn Cumberland Expressway, which was officially designated as the future route of Interstate 66 (I-66), but the interest in that project has been lost.

KY 80 serves rural portions of Barren, Metcalfe, Adair (including Columbia), Russell (including Russell Springs), and southern Casey counties while en route to Somerset, in Pulaski County.

=== Somerset to Hazard ===
Between Somerset and London (Laurel County), KY 80 is again the primary route. From London to Hazard, KY 80 is again supplanted, this time by the Hal Rogers Parkway (formerly the Daniel Boone Parkway), a Super-two highway that acts as an expressway in the area. KY 80 serves rural portions of Clay, Leslie, and Perry counties, including the cities of Manchester and Hyden, where US 421 runs concurrently with KY 80 between those two cities, before rejoining the Parkway near Hazard.

=== Hazard to Pikeville and the Virginia border ===
KY 80 is a modern four-lane highway, though not controlled access, from Hazard through Knott County to Watergap in Floyd County where it joins US 23 southeastward. The section of Kentucky Route 80 from Hazard to Watergap was completely new construction; most of the remnants of KY 80's old alignment were renamed with several designations, primarily KY 550. KY 80 continues, concurrent with US 23 to Pikeville, and joins US 460 until reaching Belcher in southern Pike County; it continues solo through Elkhorn City, and continues into Virginia as Virginia State Route 80.

== History ==
=== Before 1980 ===
KY 80's original western terminus was located near Bristow, just east of Bowling Green from its 1929 establishment through the early 1950s; the segment from Columbus to US 68 in Aurora was originally signed as KY 98. In the late 1940s, when US 68 was rerouted to its current routing between Bowling Green and Perryville, KY 80's western terminus was truncated to its junction with US 68 in Edmonton. KY 80 was extended to its late-20th century length, including the concurrency with US 68, at sometime in 1954. From around 1948 through 1952, Russell S. Dyche, an editor for the London Sentinel-Echo, led a years-long effort to persuade the Kentucky Department of Highways (now the Kentucky Transportation Cabinet) to extend the KY 80 designation westward onto its route from Edmonton to Columbus, including the US 68 concurrency. Dyche, who also led a motorcade to KY 80's current western terminus all the way from Elkhorn City, continued to promote the highway until his late 1959 death. In 1978, the segment of KY 80 from Somerset to London was named the Russell Dyche Memorial Highway.

=== Columbus–Belmont ferry ===
Originally, KY 80 continued westward via a ferry crossing of the Mississippi River to Belmont, Missouri, where it continued westward as Missouri Route 80, which travels west to US 61/US 62 (and I-55 in the present day) between New Madrid and Sikeston, Missouri. The toll ferry service was discontinued in 1984.

=== Proposed Interstate 66 in the Daniel Boone National Forest ===
The state's I-66 proposals called for KY 80 to be bypassed in the area between Somerset and London, with the new road to share only the crossing over the Rockcastle River gorge. This proposal has met with controversy in the mid-2000s, with area residents preferring that the new Interstate be built on the existing KY 80 right of way. The project has since lost interest.

=== Late 20th century realignments ===
KY 80's original alignments in Knott and Perry counties were renumbered to KY 550 at some point around 1979–1980. Several other segments of KY 80 were rerouted in various areas between Somerset and Prestonsburg between 1977 and 1984.

=== Widening project in south-central Kentucky ===
When the US 68/KY 80 four-lane realignment between Hopkinsville and Bowling Green was completed in the late 1990s, several of the route's old alignments were kept intact, notably in areas between Hopkinsville and Bowling Green. As new four-lane segments were completed, old alignments of US 68/KY 80 in Fairview, Elkton, Russellville, and Auburn were converted into business routes of US 68 as the widening project continued. Sometime in 2007, the route was rerouted onto a bypass route around Cadiz; the original alignment in that city also became a US 68 business loop. In the early 2010s, US 68 and KY 80's alignment in Bowling Green would eventually be rerouted on Veterans Memorial Boulevard. The highway's Glasgow alignment was rerouted onto much of the Veterans Outer Loop in 2015.

=== Rerouting in the Purchase area ===
The KY 80 alignment from Brewers to Aurora was renumbered as KY 402 at some point during the 2002/2003 fiscal year. Around that time, KY 80 was re-routed onto a four-lane highway from Mayfield to Aurora via the northern outskirts of Murray. The segment from US 641 to US 68 was completed in 2006, while the remainder was built during the 2008/2009 fiscal year.

=== Eggners Ferry Bridge collapse of 2012 ===
On January 26, 2012, the Eggner's Ferry Bridge carrying KY 80 and US 68 over Kentucky Lake (Tennessee River) near Aurora collapsed because a cargo ship crashed into one of the bridge's support pillars. The bridge re-opened to traffic in May 2012, but it was replaced by a four-lane bridge that was built more than three years afterwards. A new bridge with similar design over Lake Barkley was completed in 2018 to replace the old bridge near Canton.

== Major intersections ==
County	Location	mi	km	Destinations	Notes
Hickman	Columbus	0.000	0.000	KY 58 / KY 123 south / Great River Road (National Route) south	Western end of KY 123/Great River Road concurrency
Hickman		1.526	2.456	KY 123 north / Great River Road (National Route) north	Eastern end of KY 123/Great River Road concurrency; western end of Great River Road Alternate concurrency
Carlisle	Arlington	6.005	9.664	KY 1772 south	Northern terminus of KY 1772
Carlisle	Arlington	6.379	10.266	US 51 / Great River Road (Alternate National Route) south – Bardwell, Clinton	Eastern end of Great River Road Alternate concurrency
Carlisle	Milburn	13.367	21.512	KY 1371 north	Southern terminus of KY 1371
Carlisle	Milburn			KY 1377 north	Southern terminus of KY 1377
Carlisle	Fulgham	15.528	24.990	KY 307 – Fulton	
Graves	Fancy Farm	19.758	31.797	KY 339 north	Western end of KY 339 concurrency
Graves	Fancy Farm	19.801	31.867	KY 339 south	Eastern end of KY 339 concurrency
Graves		26.128	42.049	KY 384 west	Eastern terminus of KY 384
Graves	Mayfield	28.328– 28.528	45.589– 45.911	I-69 north / US 45 Byp. north / KY 80 Bus. east (Broadway Street) – Fulton, Benton	Western end of I-69/US 45 Bypass concurrency; I-69 exit 22; western terminus of KY 80 Bus.
Graves	Mayfield			I-69 south – Fulton	Eastern end of I-69 concurrency; I-69 exit 22
Graves	Mayfield			US 45 / US 45 Byp. ends – Fulton, Mayfield	Eastern end of US 45 Bypass concurrency; southern terminus of US 45 Bypass
Graves	Mayfield	30.727	49.450	KY 303 (Cuba Road)	
Graves		31.215	50.236	KY 121 Bus. north (Paris Road)	Southern terminus of KY 121 Bus.
Graves		31.314	50.395	KY 97 south / KY 121 north (South Castleman Bypass) – Sedalia	Western end of KY 121 concurrency
Graves		32.902	52.951	KY 940 north	Southern terminus of KY 940
Graves		33.925	54.597	KY 1124 east	Western terminus of KY 1124
Graves		34.550	55.603	KY 121 south – Farmington	Eastern end of KY 121 concurrency
Graves		37.973	61.112	KY 564 – Farmington	
Graves		39.617	63.757	KY 1124	
Calloway		41.335	66.522	KY 1836 (Hammond Road) to KY 121	
Calloway		44.811	72.116	KY 299	
Calloway		46.780	75.285	KY 783	Access to Murray-Calloway County Airport
Calloway		49.827	80.189	US 641 – Benton, Murray	
Calloway		51.791	83.350	KY 1483	
Calloway		56.907	91.583	KY 94C south	Northern terminus of KY 94C
Calloway		56.401	90.769	KY 464	
Calloway		57.847	93.096	KY 1551	
Calloway		59.462	95.695	KY 1346	
Marshall		63.407	102.044	KY 94 west (Resort Road)	Eastern terminus of KY 94
Marshall		63.243	101.780	US 68 west to KY 402 – Paducah	Western end of US 68 concurrency
Kentucky Lake		63.825– 64.644	102.716– 104.034	Eggner's Ferry Bridge	
Trigg	Land Between the Lakes	67.244	108.219	KY 453 (The Trace)	Interchange
Trigg	Lake Barkley	72.096– 72.696	116.027– 116.993	Canton Bridge	
Trigg	Canton	73.996	119.085	KY 164 east (Linton Road)	Western terminus of KY 164
Trigg		75.835	122.045	KY 1489 east (State Park Road)	Western terminus of KY 1489; access to Lake Barkley State Resort Park, Lake Barkley State Park Airport
Trigg		78.090	125.674	KY 272 east (Old Canton Pike)	Western terminus of KY 272
Trigg		79.591	128.089	KY 1489 west (Blue Spring Road)	Eastern terminus of KY 1489; access to Lake Barkley State Park Airport
Trigg		80.678	129.839	US 68 Bus. east (Canton Road) – Cadiz Business District	Western terminus of US 68 Bus.
Trigg		81.183	130.651	KY 1175 (Old Dover Road)	
Trigg		82.401	132.612	KY 139 (South Road) – Dover	
Trigg	Cadiz	85.068	136.904	US 68 Bus. west (Main Street) – Cadiz Business District	Eastern terminus of US 68 Bus.
Trigg	Cadiz	85.088	136.936	KY 3468 east	Western terminus of KY 3468
Trigg	Cadiz	88.078	141.748	KY 3468 west	Eastern terminus of KY 3468; access to Trigg County Museum
Trigg	Cadiz	88.313	142.126	KY 276 west (Rocky Ridge Road) / KY 1585 south (North Montgomery Road)	Eastern terminus of KY 276; northern terminus of KY 1585
Trigg	Cadiz	88.613– 88.813	142.609– 142.931	I-24 – Nashville, Paducah	Exit 65 on I-24
Trigg		89.348	143.792	KY 958 north (Barefield Road)	Southern terminus of KY 958
Trigg		92.098	148.217	KY 128 north (Wallonia Road) – Cerulean	Southern terminus of KY 128
Trigg		92.335	148.599	KY 3186 east (Tobacco Road) – Gracey	Western terminus of KY 3186
Christian		93.179	149.957	KY 1026 (Gracey-Sinking Fork Road) – Gracey	
Christian		93.840	151.021	KY 3186 west (Lester Road) – Gracey	Eastern terminus of KY 3186
Christian		95.392	153.519	KY 1349 north (Quisenberry Lane)	Southern terminus of KY 1349
Christian		99.877	160.736	US 68 Byp. east / US 68 Truck east / KY 1682 east (Eagle Way) to I-169	Western terminus of US 68 Byp./US 68 Truck route
Christian	Hopkinsville	101.661	163.608	KY 91 north (Princeton Road)	Southern terminus of KY 91
Christian	Hopkinsville	101.862	163.931	KY 109 north (Dawson Springs Road)	Western end of KY 109 concurrency; access to Pennyrile Forest State Resort Park
Christian	Hopkinsville	102.577	165.082	KY 1007 (North Drive)	
Christian	Hopkinsville	103.306	166.255	KY 107 south (South Main Street)	Western end of KY 107 concurrency (westbound)
Christian	Hopkinsville	103.370	166.358	US 41 north (South Virginia Street)	Western end of US 41 concurrency (westbound); western end of KY 107 concurrency (eastbound)
Christian	Hopkinsville	103.429	166.453	Liberty Street	Western end of US 41 concurrency (eastbound)
Christian	Hopkinsville	103.489	166.549	KY 2544 north (South Clay Street)	
Christian	Hopkinsville	103.609	166.743	KY 107 north (South Campbell Street)	
Christian	Hopkinsville	103.694	166.879	US 41 Alt. south (Walnut Street)	Northern terminus of US 41 Alt.
Christian	Hopkinsville	103.899	167.209	US 41 south / KY 109 south (East 9th Street)	Eastern end of US 41/KY 109 concurrency
Christian	Hopkinsville	104.199– 104.299	167.692– 167.853	I-169 – Fort Campbell, Madisonville	I-169 exit 9
Christian	Hopkinsville	105.683	170.080	KY 1979 west (East 7th Street)	Eastern terminus of KY 1979
Christian	Hopkinsville	107.089	172.343	US 68 Byp. west / US 68 Truck west (Martin Luther King Highway)	Eastern terminus of US 68 Byp./US 68 Truck route
Christian		108.621	174.809	KY 1716 north (Overby Lane)	Southern terminus of KY 1716
Christian		111.313	179.141	KY 1027 south (Rosetown Road)	Northern terminus of KY 1027
Christian		111.711	179.781	US 68 Alt. east (Jefferson Davis Road) – Fairview	Western terminus of US 68 Alt.
Christian		112.453	180.976	KY 1843 (Vaughns Grove-Fairview Road)	
Christian		112.975	181.816	Britmart Road – Jefferson Davis Monument Historic Site	Former KY 1801; historic site to the south
Todd		113.730	183.031	US 68 Alt. west (Jefferson Davis Road) – Fairview	Eastern terminus of US 68 Alt.
Todd	Tress Shop	117.757	189.512	KY 475 south / Tress Shop Road (to Stringtown Road)	Northern terminus of KY 475
Todd		118.999	191.510	US 68 Bus. east (West Jefferson Davis Highway) – Elkton	Western terminus of US 68 Bus.
Todd	Elkton	121.763	195.959	KY 181 (Greenville Road/North Main Street) – Elkton, Guthrie	Access to Standard Field, Lake Malone State Park, Elkton Historic District, and Birthplace of Robert Penn Warren
Todd		124.048	199.636	US 68 Bus. west (East Jefferson Davis Highway) – Elkton	Eastern terminus of US 68 Bus.
Todd		126.962	204.326	KY 1309 east (Old Volney Road) – Daysville	Western terminus of KY 1309
Logan	Whippoorwill	130.456	209.949	KY 1151 (Union Church Road)	
Logan	Russellville	135.762	218.488	US 431 south / US 68 Bus. east (Hopkinsville Road) – Adairville, Clarksville, TN	Western end of US 431 concurrency; western terminus of US 68 Bus.
Logan	Russellville	136.335	219.410	KY 178 (Highland Lick Road)	
Logan	Russellville	137.343	221.032	US 431 north (Terry Wilcut Highway) – Lewisburg, Central City	Eastern end of US 431 concurrency; access to Lake Malone State Park
Logan	Russellville	137.726	221.649	KY 3519 (Lewisburg Road/North Main Street)	
Logan	Russellville	139.933	225.200	KY 79 (Morgantown Road/Peyton Street)	
Logan	Russellville	141.560	227.819	US 68 Bus. west (Bowling Green Road) / US 79 south – Franklin	Eastern terminus of US 68 Bus.; northern terminus of US 79; access to Russellville-Logan County Airport
Logan		145.819	234.673	KY 2369 south (Dennis Corinth Road)	Northern terminus of KY 2369
Logan		148.246	238.579	KY 722 west (Duncans Chapel Road)	Eastern terminus of KY 722
Logan		149.037	239.852	US 68 Bus. east (West Main Street) – Auburn Business District	Western terminus of US 68 Bus.
Logan	Auburn	150.702	242.531	KY 103 (Chandlers Road/North College Street) – Chandlers Chapel, Auburn Business District	
Logan		152.042	244.688	US 68 Bus. west (East Main Street) – Auburn Business District	Eastern terminus of US 68 Bus.
Logan		153.974	247.797	KY 73 (Cave Springs Road/South Union Road) – South Union	Access to 1869 Shaker Tavern, Historic Franklin
Logan		155.223	249.807	KY 1466 (Shakertown Road)	Access to Shaker Museum Historic Site
Logan		156.634	252.078	KY 2349 south (Stamps Road to Hardison Road)	Northern terminus of KY 2349
Warren		157.010	252.683	KY 240 east (Petros Road)	Western terminus of KY 240
Warren		159.892	257.321	KY 242 east (Richpond-Rockfield Road) – Rockfield	Western terminus of KY 242
Warren		161.713	260.252	KY 1083 north (Browning Road)	Southern terminus of KY 1083
Warren	Bowling Green	164.147	264.169	KY 432 north (Blue Level Road)	Southern terminus of KY 432
Warren	Bowling Green	164.747– 164.899	265.135– 265.379	I-165 to I-65 – Owensboro	I-165 Exit 5
Warren	Bowling Green	166.025	267.191	US 231 south (Campbell Lane) / US 68 Bus. east (Russellville Road)	Western end of US 231 concurrency
Warren	Bowling Green	167.537	269.625	US 231 north / US 231 Bus. south (Morgantown Road) to I-165	Eastern end of US 231 concurrency
Warren	Bowling Green	168.349	270.931	KY 2665 (Glen Lily Road)	
Warren	Bowling Green	169.287	272.441	KY 1435 north (Barren River Road)	Southern terminus of KY 1435
Warren	Bowling Green	171.153	275.444	KY 185 north (Gordon Avenue)	Southern terminus of KY 185
Warren	Bowling Green	171.462	275.941	US 68 Bus. west (Kentucky Street) / KY 234 east (7th Avenue)	Eastern terminus of US 68 Bus.
Warren	Bowling Green	171.939	276.709	US 31W south (East Riverview Drive)	Western end of US 31W concurrency
Warren	Bowling Green	173.391	279.046	KY 3225 west (Old Louisville Road)	Eastern terminus of KY 3225
Warren	Bowling Green	174.358	280.602	KY 1402 east (Porter Pike) to Plum Springs Loop / KY 957	Western terminus of KY 1402
Warren	Bowling Green	174.640	281.056	KY 446 east to I-65 – Louisville, Nashville	Interchange; western terminus of KY 446; access to Corvette Museum
Warren	Bowling Green	175.354	282.205	KY 957 north	Southern terminus of KY 957
Warren	Bowling Green	177.673	285.937	KY 526 west (Mt Olivet Road) to KY 1320	Eastern terminus of KY 526
Warren	Bowling Green	178.174	286.743	US 31W north (Louisville Road)	Eastern end of US 31W concurrency
Warren				KY 3145 to I-65	Southbound entrance only; partial interchange opened July 6, 2017; northern terminus of KY 3145 until December 21, 2018
Warren	Oakland	183.463	295.255	I-65 south – Nashville	Southbound entrance only; I-65 exit 36
Warren		185.173	298.007	KY 101 (Smiths Grove-Scottsville Road) to I-65	
Warren	Hays	189.501	304.972	KY 259 north	Southern terminus of KY 259
Barren	Merry Oaks	191.343	307.937	KY 2240 south	Northern terminus of KY 2240
Barren	Bon Ayr	194.181	312.504	KY 255 (Park City-Bon Ayr Road/Bon Ayr Road)	
Barren		196.236	315.811	KY 685 (Stovall Road/Beckton Road)	
Barren		198.093	318.800	KY 2189 north (Park City-Glasgow Road)	Southern terminus of KY 2189
Barren	Glasgow	200.259	322.286	US 68 Bus. east (West Main Street) / KY 3600 south (Veterans Outer Loop) to Cumberland Expressway / KY 1297	Northern terminus of KY 3600
Barren	Glasgow	201.536	324.341	KY 90 (Happy Valley Road)	
Barren	Glasgow	203.471	327.455	US 31E (North Jackson Highway)	
Barren	Glasgow	205.758	331.135	US 68 Bus. west (Columbia Avenue/Edmonton Road) / KY 1519 south (Veterans Outer Loop) to Cumberland Expressway	Eastern terminus of US 68 Bus.; northern terminus of KY 1519
Barren		205.937	331.423	KY 740 north (Coral Hill Road)	Southern terminus of KY 740
Metcalfe	Wisdom	215.023	346.046	KY 640 (Knob Lick-Wisdom Road/Wisdom Road)	
Metcalfe		218.710– 218.970	351.980– 352.398	Cumberland Expressway – Bowling Green, Somerset	Exit 27 on Cumberland Parkway
Metcalfe	Edmonton	219.609	353.426	KY 3234 west (Old Glasgow Road)	Eastern terminus of KY 3234
Metcalfe	Edmonton	221.066	355.771	KY 861 west (Randolph Street)	Eastern terminus of KY 861
Metcalfe	Edmonton	221.931	357.163	KY 163 south (South Main Street)	Northern terminus of KY 163
Metcalfe	Edmonton	222.371	357.871	US 68 east (Greensburg Street) to Cumberland Expressway	Eastern end of US 68 concurrency
Metcalfe	Edmonton	223.338	359.428	KY 3524 west (Industrial Drive)	Eastern terminus of KY 3524
Metcalfe	Gascon	225.054	362.189	KY 2399 west (Cork-Gascon Road)	Eastern terminus of KY 2399
Adair		232.968	374.926	KY 768 south	Western end of KY 768 concurrency
Adair	Weed	233.307	375.471	KY 768 north (Weed-Keltner Road)	Eastern end of KY 768 concurrency
Adair		237.825	382.742	KY 2982 east	Western terminus of KY 2982
Adair		238.733	384.204	KY 959 north (Milltown Church Road)	Southern terminus of KY 959
Adair		240.364	386.828	KY 2973 north (Lampton Road)	Southern terminus of KY 2973
Adair		241.847	389.215	KY 61 south (South Burkesville Road) to Cumberland Expressway	Western end of KY 61 concurrency
Adair	Columbia	243.217	391.420	KY 55 (Columbia Bypass) to KY 61 north – Greensburg, Campbellsville	Eastern end of KY 61 concurrency; southern terminus of KY 55
Adair	Columbia	243.977	392.643	KY 2287 north (Greensburg Road)	Western end of KY 2287 concurrency
Adair	Columbia	244.005	392.688	KY 2287 south (Tutt Street)	Eastern end of KY 2287 concurrency
Adair	Columbia	244.484	393.459	KY 55 Bus. north (Campblesville Road) / KY 439 north (Greensburg Street) to Cumberland Expressway	Western end of KY 55 Bus. concurrency; traffic circle around Adair County Courthouse; southern terminus of KY 439; access to Lindsey Wilson College
Adair	Columbia	244.964	394.231	KY 2290 north (Lowes Lane)	Southern terminus of KY 2290
Adair	Columbia	245.070	394.402	KY 55 Bus. south (Jamestown Street) to Cumberland Expressway – Glens Fork	Eastern end of KY 55 Bus. concurrency
Adair		246.458	396.636	KY 3491 north (Greenhills Road)	Southern terminus of KY 3491
Adair		249.696	401.847	KY 2968 south (Powell Road)	Northern terminus of KY 2968
Adair		250.392	402.967	KY 531 north (Christine Road)	Southern terminus of KY 531
Adair		251.143	404.175	KY 1729 east (Sano Road)	Western terminus of KY 1729
Russell	Royville	256.368	412.584	KY 1729 west	Eastern terminus of KY 1729
Russell	Russell Springs	257.136	413.820	KY 1870 west (Old Columbia Road)	Eastern terminus of KY 1870
Russell	Russell Springs	257.336	414.142	KY 430 south (Jamestown Road)	Northern terminus of KY 430
Russell	Russell Springs	258.012	415.230	KY 379 south (Main Street)	Western end of KY 379 concurrency
Russell	Russell Springs	258.330	415.742	KY 1545 north (Bottoms Road)	Southern terminus of KY 1545
Russell	Russell Springs	258.396	415.848	KY 379 north / KY 3017 south (Lakeway Drive)	Eastern end of KY 379 concurrency; northern terminus of KY 3017
Russell	Russell Springs	258.614	416.199	US 127 to Cumberland Expressway – Liberty, Jamestown	
Russell		261.200	420.361	KY 910 east	Western terminus of KY 910
Russell		262.145	421.881	KY 76 north	Western end of KY 76 concurrency
Russell	Fonthill	262.685	422.751	KY 76 south	Eastern end of KY 76 concurrency
Casey	Windsor	269.092	433.062	KY 910 south (Leslie Coms Road)	Western end of KY 910 concurrency
Casey	Windsor	269.249	433.314	KY 910 north – Liberty	Eastern end of KY 910 concurrency
Pulaski		272.700	438.868	KY 837	
Pulaski		276.594– 276.821	445.135– 445.500	Cumberland Expressway	Exit 78 on Cumberland Parkway
Pulaski		277.032	445.840	KY 3262 west	Eastern terminus of KY 3262
Pulaski		278.210	447.736	KY 2993 north (Coldweather Church Road)	Southern terminus of KY 2993
Pulaski	Nancy	280.160	450.874	KY 196 south	Northern terminus of KY 196
Pulaski	Nancy	280.685	451.719	KY 235 south	Northern terminus of KY 235
Pulaski		282.155	454.084	KY 3189 north (Pulaski County Park Road)	Southern terminus of KY 3189; access to Pulaski County Park
Pulaski		284.489	457.841	KY 1001 east (Lees Ford Dock Road)	Western terminus of KY 1001; access to Lee's Ford Marina
Pulaski		287.109	462.057	KY 1248 west	Eastern terminus of KY 1248
Pulaski		287.235	462.260	KY 3261 south	Western end of KY 3261 concurrency
Pulaski		277.546	446.667	KY 914 east (Southeastern Bypass) / KY 80 Bus. east / KY 3261 north – Burnside	Western end of KY 914 concurrency; eastern end of KY 3261 concurrency; western terminus of KY 80 Bus.
Pulaski		278.337	447.940	KY 914 west (Southeastern Bypass) to Cumberland Expressway – Bowling Green	Eastern end of KY 914 concurrency, eastern terminus of KY 6017, KY 80 continues left along KY 914, keep straight for KY 6017
Pulaski		288.374	464.093	KY 80 Conn. (Hacker Connector) to KY 3261 (Hacker Road)	
Pulaski	Somerset	289.456	465.834	KY 1225 south (Tigers Way) to KY 80 Bus.	Northern terminus of KY 1225
Pulaski	Somerset	289.913	466.570	KY 3263 west (Ringgold Road)	Eastern terminus of KY 3263; access to Eastern Kentucky University Somerset Campus
Pulaski	Somerset	290.541	467.580	US 27 to Cumberland Expressway – Stanford, Burnside, Bowling Green	Access to Lake Cumberland Regional Airport and Somerset Community College
Pulaski	Somerset	290.797	467.992	KY 2300 south (Clifty Road)	Northern terminus of KY 2300
Pulaski	Somerset	291.295	468.794	KY 1247 (North Main Street) – Somerset	
Pulaski	Somerset	291.268	468.750	KY 39 (Crab Orchard Road) – Crab Orchard, Somerset	
Pulaski	Somerset	292.403	470.577	KY 3260 east (Pumphouse Road)	Western terminus of KY 3260
Pulaski	Somerset	292.856	471.306	KY 80 Bus. west (East Mt. Vernon Street) to KY 192	Eastern terminus of KY 80 Bus.
Pulaski		293.292	472.008	KY 914 west (Southeastern Bypass) to US 27 / KY 90 – Burnside, Monticello	Access to Burnside Island State Park and Big South Fork National River and Recreation Area
Pulaski	Sugar Hill	295.336	475.297	KY 3260 west (Pumphouse Road)	Eastern terminus of KY 3260
Pulaski	Barnesburg	297.681	479.071	KY 1317 north (Pine Hill Road)	Southern terminus of KY 1317
Pulaski		299.314	481.699	KY 461 north to I-75 north – Mount Vernon	Interchange; southern terminus of KY 461
Pulaski	Shopville	299.929	482.689	KY 692 west (Grundy Road)	Eastern terminus of KY 692
Pulaski		301.035	484.469	KY 1003 south	Northern terminus of KY 1003
Pulaski		303.067	487.739	KY 1675 south – Stab	Northern terminus of KY 1675
Pulaski	Squib	309.382	497.902	KY 1956 east (Old London Road)	Western terminus of KY 1956
Laurel		318.893	513.209	KY 1535 (Newberry Road/Sinking Creek Road)	
Laurel		320.241	515.378	KY 1035 (Pine Top Road)	
Laurel	London	321.352	517.166	KY 1956 west (Somerset Road)	Eastern terminus of KY 1956
Laurel	London	321.983– 322.125	518.181– 518.410	I-75 – Knoxville, Lexington	Exit 41 on I-75
Laurel	London	322.488	518.994	Hal Rogers Parkway east / US 25 north (North Laurel Road)	Western end of US 25 concurrency; western terminus of Hal Rogers Parkway
Laurel	London	323.193	520.129	KY 3432 west (West 16th Street)	Eastern terminus of KY 3432
Laurel	London	323.468	520.571	KY 1769 north (Moren Road)	Southern terminus of KY 1769
Laurel	London	323.946	521.341	KY 1006 south (West 5th Street)	Northern terminus of KY 1006
Laurel	London			US 25 south (Main Street)	Eastern end of US 25 concurrency
Laurel	London	324.167	521.696	KY 354 north (Tobacco Road)	Southern terminus of KY 354
Laurel	London	324.687	522.533	KY 638 east (North McWhorter Street)	Eastern terminus of KY 638
Laurel	London	325.562	523.941	KY 472 east	Western terminus of KY 472
Laurel	London	326.157	524.899	KY 192 to I-75 / Hal Rogers Parkway	
Laurel		328.089	528.008	KY 1561 south (Conley Road)	Northern terminus of KY 1561
Laurel		328.652	528.914	KY 1305 east (Tom Cat Trail)	Western terminus of KY 1305
Laurel		329.131	529.685	KY 521 south (Laurel Road)	Northern terminus of KY 523
Laurel		329.367	530.065	KY 830 south (Rough Creek Road)	Northern terminus of KY 830
Laurel		331.825	534.021	KY 488 north (Mount Salem Road)	Southern terminus of KY 488
Laurel	Lida	333.572	536.832	KY 1305 west (Tom Cat Trail)	Eastern terminus of KY 1305
Laurel		334.321	538.037	KY 1803 (Marydell Road/Blackwater Road)	
Laurel		336.680	541.834	KY 1803 south (Marydell Road)	Northern terminus of KY 1803
Clay	Manchester	345.143– 345.243	555.454– 555.615	Hal Rogers Parkway – Hazard, London	Exit 20 on Hal Rogers Parkway
Clay	Manchester	345.343	555.776	US 421 / KY 11 north / KY 2076 north	Western end of US 421/KY 11 concurrency; southern terminus of KY 2076
Clay	Manchester	345.658	556.283	KY 3480 north	Southern terminus of KY 3480
Clay		346.531	557.688	KY 11 south	Eastern end of KY 11 concurrency
Clay	Garrard	346.951	558.364	KY 1999 east (Paces Creek Road)	Western terminus of KY 1999
Clay		348.566	560.963	KY 149 east (Lockard's Creek Road)	Western terminus of KY 149
Clay		351.660	565.942	KY 1524 east	Western terminus of KY 1524
Clay		351.848	566.244	KY 2443 west (Goose Rock Shortcut)	Eastern terminus of KY 2443
Clay		353.887	569.526	KY 873 north (Elk Creek Mountain Road)	
Clay		359.658	578.813	KY 66 south – Peabody, Beverly	Western end of KY 66 concurrency; access to Red Bird Mission
Clay	Big Creek	360.433	580.061	KY 66 north to Hal Rogers Parkway – Oneida	Eastern end of KY 66 concurrency
Leslie		362.810	583.886	KY 3428 north (Ulysses Creek)	Southern terminus of KY 3428
Leslie	Bobs Fork	364.438	586.506	KY 1482 north	Southern terminus of KY 1482
Leslie	Hyden	375.045	603.576	KY 118 north to Hal Rogers Parkway – Hazard, Manchester	Southern terminus of KY 118
Leslie	Hyden	375.566	604.415	KY 257 north	Southern terminus of KY 257
Leslie	Hyden	376.072	605.229	US 421 south – Harlan	Eastern end of US 421 concurrency
Leslie		377.997	608.327	KY 3426 north (Flackey Branch Road)	Southern terminus of KY 3426
Leslie		381.332	613.694	KY 699 east (Cutshin Road) – Cutshin	Western terminus of KY 699
Leslie	Wooton	382.276	615.214	KY 1807 east (Wooton Road)	Western terminus of KY 1807
Perry		388.117	624.614	KY 1096 east (Big Creek Road)	Western terminus of KY 1096
Perry		390.169	627.916	KY 451 north	Western end of KY 451 concurrency
Perry		390.411	628.306	KY 451 south to Hal Rogers Parkway	Eastern end of KY 451 concurrency
Perry		391.049	629.332	KY 2021 west	Eastern terminus of KY 2021
Perry	Hazard	393.652	633.521	KY 15 south – Hazard	Ramp from KY 15 south and ramp to KY 15 south
Perry	Hazard	393.752	633.682	KY 15 north / KY 550 east (Combs Road)	Ramp from KY 15 north and ramp to KY 15 north; western end of concurrency with KY 15
Perry	Hazard	395.333	636.227	KY 15 north to Hal Rogers Parkway west – London, Jackson, Campton	Exit 59 from Hal Rogers Parkway; eastern end of KY 15 concurrency; access to Buckhorn Lake State Resort Park
Perry		398.719	641.676	KY 1146 north (Lost Creek Road) – Dice	Western end of KY 1146 concurrency
Perry		399.141	642.355	KY 1146 south (Bulan-Hiner Road) – Bulan, Darfork	Eastern end of KY 1146 concurrency
Perry		399.933	643.630	KY 3351 north (Pigeonroost Road) – Upper Pidgeonroost	Southern terminus of KY 3351
Perry		402.022	646.992	KY 476 Conn. to KY 476 – Dwarf, Stacy	Short connector to KY 476
Knott		403.904	650.020	KY 2102 south (Trace Branch Road)	Northern terminus of KY 2102
Knott	Big Branch	405.269	652.217	KY 3209 west to KY 1087	Eastern terminus of KY 3209
Knott		408.952	658.144	KY 1102 south (Montgomery Creek Road)	Northern terminus of KY 1102
Knott		411.276	661.885	KY 160 – Hindman	
Knott		415.054	667.965	KY 1087 / KY 1098 – Vest, Soft Shell	
Knott		417.904	672.551	KY 2029 north	Southern terminus of KY 2029
Floyd	West Garrett	424.582	683.298	KY 777 north to KY 7 / KY 550	Southern terminus of KY 777
Floyd	Garrett	424.854	683.736	KY 80 Conn. to KY 7 / KY 550 – Lackey, Garrett, Wayland, Hueysville	Ramp to KY 7/KY 550
Floyd		426.475	686.345	KY 680 east – McDowell, Wheelwright	Western terminus of KY 680
Floyd	Eastern	428.004	688.806	KY 550 west – Eastern, Hueysville, Garrett	Eastern terminus of KY 550
Floyd		428.336	689.340	KY 2554 east	
Floyd	Langley	429.236	690.788	KY 777 – Maytown	
Floyd	Martin	430.920	693.499	KY 3188 east	Western terminus of KY 3188
Floyd	Martin	431.354	694.197	KY 1210 west (Stephens Branch)	Eastern terminus of KY 1210
Floyd	Martin	431.434	694.326	KY 3188 west	Eastern terminus of KY 3188
Floyd	Martin	431.906	695.085	KY 122 east – Martin, McDowell	Western end of KY 122 concurrency
Floyd	Martin	432.742	696.431	KY 80 Spur east (The New Bridge) to KY 1428	Western terminus of KY 80 Spur
Floyd		433.018	696.875	KY 3190 south	Northern terminus of KY 3190
Floyd		433.110	697.023	KY 122 west	Eastern end of KY 122 concurrency
Floyd		436.077	701.798	KY 3383 south	Northern terminus of KY 3383
Floyd	Prestonsburg	437.707– 437.810	704.421– 704.587	US 23 north / US 460 west / KY 302 north (Watergap Road) – Pikeville, Prestonsburg	Western end of US 23/US 460 concurrency
Floyd	Allen	440.047	708.187	KY 1428	
Floyd	Banner	441.627	710.730	KY 1426 east	Western terminus of KY 1426
Floyd	Betsy Layne	448.162	721.247	KY 2557 west	Eastern terminus of KY 2557
Floyd	Harold	449.716	723.748	KY 680 west	Western terminus of KY 680
Pike		450.607	725.182	KY 1384 east	Western terminus of KY 1384
Pike		451.810	727.118	KY 3218 east	Western terminus of KY 3218
Pike		453.949	730.560	KY 2061 north	Southern terminus of KY 2061
Pike	Coal Run Village	465.035	748.401	KY 3227 east (Stone Coal Creek Road)	Western terminus of KY 3227
Pike	Pikeville	457.122	735.667	US 119 north – Meta, Williamson	Western end of US 119 concurrency
Pike	Pikeville	457.804	736.764	KY 3495 south	Northern terminus of KY 3495
Pike	Pikeville	458.592	738.032	KY 1460 north	Southern terminus of KY 1460
Pike	Pikeville	458.892	738.515	KY 1384 (Hambley Boulevard) – Pikeville	Interchange; signed as exit 24
Pike	Pikeville	459.592	739.642	KY 1426 east – Downtown Pikeville	Western end of KY 1426 concurrency; interchange; signed as exit 23
Pike	Pikeville	459.810	739.992	KY 3496 north	Southern terminus of KY 3496
Pike	Pikeville	459.932	740.189	KY 1426 west	Eastern end of KY 1426 concurrency
Pike	Pikeville	463.818	746.443	US 23 south / US 119 south – Virgie, Jenkins	Eastern end of US 23/US 119 concurrency; interchange
Pike	Crooked Creek	465.102	748.509	KY 122 west	Eastern terminus of KY 122
Pike	East Shelbiana	465.112	748.525	KY 1460 north	Southern terminus of KY 1460
Pike	Sutton	466.712	751.100	KY 3226 south	Northern terminus of KY 3226
Pike	Millard	467.530	752.417	KY 1441 north – Fishtrap	Southern terminus of KY 1441
Pike	Millard	468.348	753.733	KY 1789 east – Fishtrap Dam	Western terminus of KY 1789
Pike	Marrowbone	471.869	759.400	KY 195 south	Northern terminus of KY 195
Pike	Belcher	476.808	767.348	US 460 east – Grundy, Va.	Eastern end of US 460 concurrency
Pike	Cedarville	479.015	770.900	KY 3174 (Corridor Q) / KY 1373 north	Southern terminus of KY 1373; future US 460
Pike	Elkhorn City	479.962	772.424	KY 197 south	Northern terminus of KY 197
Pike		483.749	778.519	SR 80 east – Breaks Interstate Park	Virginia commonwealth line
1.000 mi = 1.609 km; 1.000 km = 0.621 mi: Concurrency terminus; Incomplete access

== Special routes ==
=== Mayfield business route ===
Kentucky Route 80 Business
- Location: Mayfield
- Length: 2.199 mi (3.539 km)

Kentucky Route 80 Business (KY 80 Bus.) is a business spur of KY 80 located in Mayfield, in Graves County. The main alignment of KY 80 was rerouted around Mayfield on a new four-lane alignment. Previously, KY 80 had 2.199-mile (3.539 km) gap within the city from the Purchase Parkway (now-Interstate 69) interchange to US 45 in downtown Mayfield. KY 80's main alignment resumed beyond the US 45 junction.

The entire route is in Mayfield, Graves County.

mi	km	Destinations	Notes
0.000	0.000	I-69 / US 45 Byp. / KY 80 west – Fulton, Calvert City, Paducah, Fancy Farm	Western terminus, continues as KY 80
1.825	2.937	US 45 / KY 58 – Paducah, Murray	Eastern terminus, continues as KY 58
1.000 mi = 1.609 km; 1.000 km = 0.621 mi

=== Pulaski County connector route ===
Kentucky Route 80 Connector
- Location: Pulaski County

Kentucky Route 80 Connector (KY 80 Conn.) is a roadway in Pulaski County that connects KY 80 with KY 3261. It is located on the west side of Somerset just outside of the city limits.

=== Somerset business route ===
Kentucky Route 80 Business
- Location: Somerset
- Length: 5.157 mi (8.299 km)

Kentucky Route 80 Business (KY 80 Bus.) is a business route of KY 80 located in Somerset, the Pulaski County seat. It begins on the west side of Somerset at KY 80's junction with the KY 914 bypass. It intersects US 27 and KY 1247 in downtown. Its eastern terminus after intersecting KY 192 is at mile point 21.161 of the main route of KY 80 on the east side of Somerset.

=== Floyd County spur route ===
Kentucky Route 80 Spur
- Location: Floyd County

Kentucky Route 80 Spur (KY 80S) is a spur route of KY 80 in southern Floyd County. It connects KY 80 with KY 1428 at Martin.
