= 2022 Appalachian floods =

Catastrophic flood event from July 26 to August 1

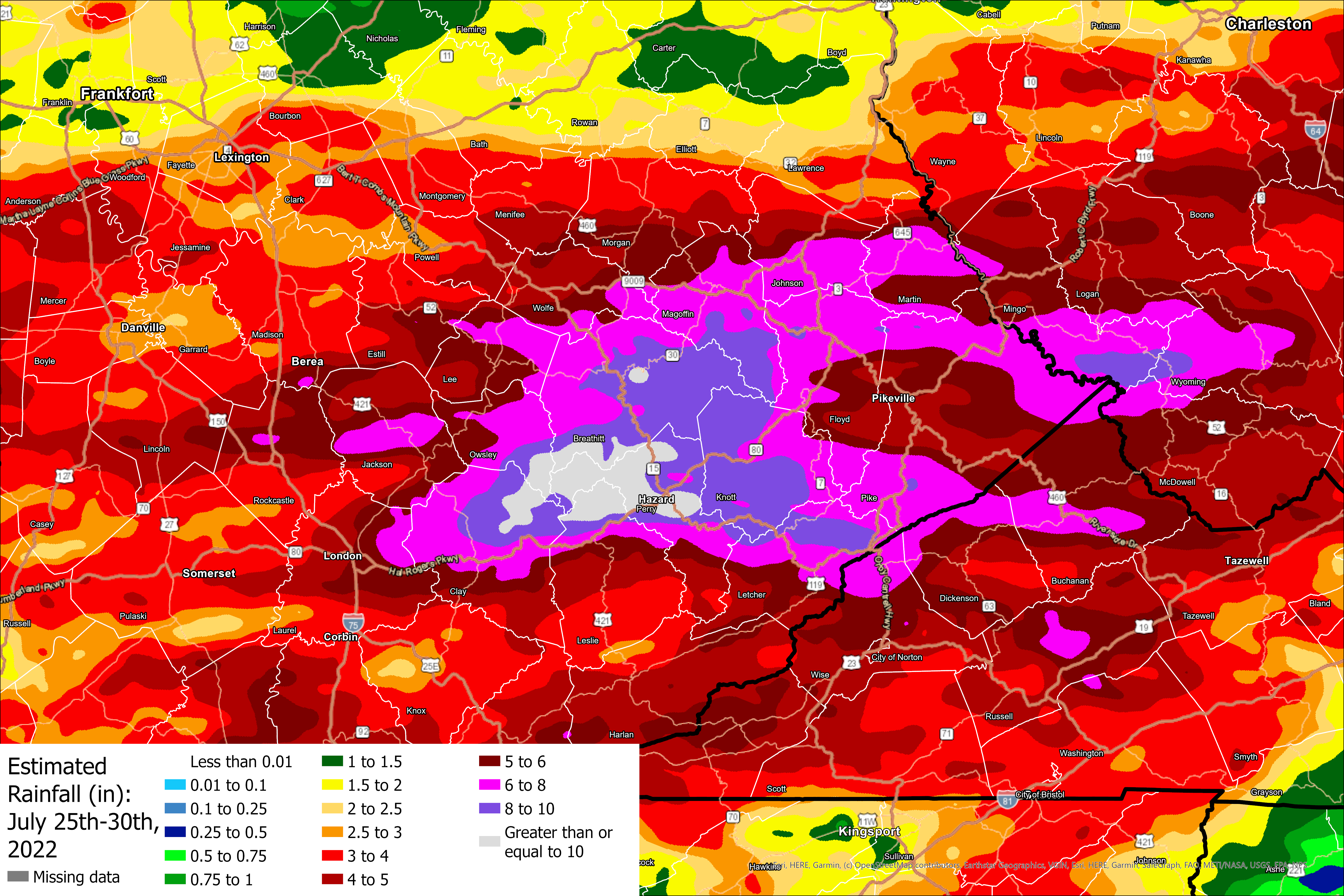
- Radar estimated rainfall in Eastern Kentucky and surrounding areas from July 25 to 30, highlighting the counties that received the most rain.
- Date: July 26 – August 1
- Location: Central Appalachia (Eastern Kentucky, Southwest Virginia, Southwest West Virginia)
- Deaths: 39 direct deaths (+6 indirect)
- Property damage: $450 million – $950 million (2023 USD)

Between July 26 and August 1, 2022, widespread and catastrophic flooding swept through portions of eastern Kentucky, southwestern Virginia, and southern West Virginia. 45 people died from the floods. Entire homes and parts of some communities were swept away by flood waters, leading to costly damage to infrastructure in the region. Over 600 helicopter rescues and countless swift water rescues by boat were needed to evacuate people who were trapped by the quickly rising flood waters. The flood event is said to be the deadliest natural disaster to hit eastern Kentucky in more than 80 years.

== Meteorological history ==
Strong low-level winds brought in copious amounts of low-level moisture, which interacted with a stationary front located near the Kentucky-Tennessee border and the upper-level jet stream to produce prolonged and repeated thunderstorms along and north of the front. These thunderstorms tracked over the same areas for several days in a row. These thunderstorms caused an intense swath of heavy rainfall with some areas reporting rainfall totals of 10 inches (250 mm) or greater in parts of eastern Kentucky.

== Flood event ==
=== July 26 ===
The flood event first began in southwestern West Virginia on July 26. In Mingo County, the Gilbert Creek area along the Kentucky/Virginia/West Virginia border had several homes impacted and several bridges washed out, limiting access to some areas. More flooding occurred in nearby McDowell County as well, in addition to other areas. This, combined with additional rainfall and flooding on July 28, led to a state of emergency being declared by Governor Jim Justice for six counties: Mingo, McDowell, Fayette, Greenbrier, Logan, and Wyoming. Partly as a result of the flooding, Huntington, West Virginia recorded their wettest July on record with 9.41 in (239 mm) of rain.

=== July 28–29 ===
Governor of Kentucky Andy Beshear declared a state of emergency on July 28. after what was described as a thousand-year flooding event. The Kentucky Court of Justice closed the judicial centers in Floyd, Letcher, Magoffin, and Perry counties due to the extreme flooding. The storms dumped up to 10.4 inches (260 mm) of rain on parts of the state. Kentucky cities severely affected by the floods include Hazard, Jackson, Paintsville, Prestonsburg, Martin, Pikeville, Hindman, Whitesburg, Fleming-Neon, and Jenkins.

Many roads were shut down in these areas including Main Street in Hazard, Mayo Trail in Pikeville, KY 317 in Fleming-Neon, Lakeside Drive and Main Street in Jenkins, South Fork Road, South Mountain Road, Bold Camp Road, and Main Street in Pound, Virginia, and portions of US 23 in Wise, Virginia. Evacuations were ordered in the downtown areas of cities that were severely flooded including Hazard, Fleming-Neon, Jenkins, Martin, Pound, and Clintwood, Virginia. The North Fork of the Kentucky River set record high crests in Whitesburg and Jackson, and over 33,000 customers lost electricity.

In Hindman in Knott County, nearly all buildings in the downtown area sustained some level of flood damage from Troublesome Creek, which passes through the area. The Appalachian Artisan Center sustained extensive damage to the museum and several studios, a new swimming pool and skatepark in town were severely damaged, and many homes and businesses were heavily damaged or destroyed. Nearby, Hindman Settlement School and Appalachian School of Luthiery were both flooded with several feet of water and heavily damaged, along with the Troublesome Creek Stringed Instrument Company. Upstream from Hindman, Alice Lloyd College in Pippa Passes sustained major damage due to Troublesome Creek, along with the surrounding community. Just northwest of Hindman, in a particularly tragic incident, four children were killed when they were swept out of their mother's arms along Montgomery Creek. Both parents survived despite being stranded in a tree for eight hours.

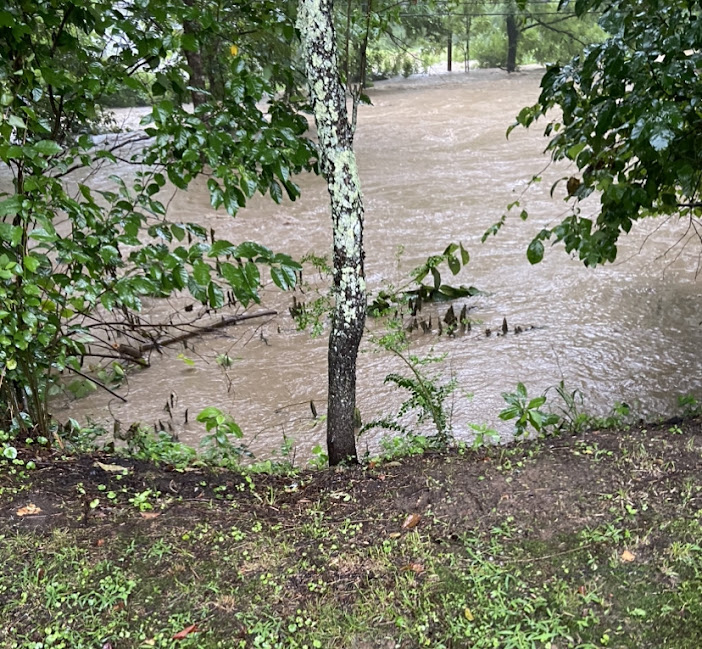
Poor Fork Cumberland River in southern Letcher County during flooding.

In Letcher County, Whitesburg, and surrounding communities were severely impacted by the North Fork River and Rockhouse Creek. Many businesses were destroyed in Whitesburg, including a used car dealership that had been in business for four decades. At Appalshop, which housed a vast media collection of Appalachian history, some of the media vault's contents were swept away and scattered about, including film of oral history, musical performances, and photo collections. The North Fork rose about 18 feet (5.5 m) in 10 hours to set a record crest in Whitesburg of approximately 20 feet (6.1 m), beating the previous 1957 record by over 5 feet (1.5 m), before the gauge was apparently destroyed in the flood. In southern Knott County, Carr Creek Lake rose over 15 feet (4.6 m) in 12 hours along the Carr Fork River, a tributary of the North Fork.

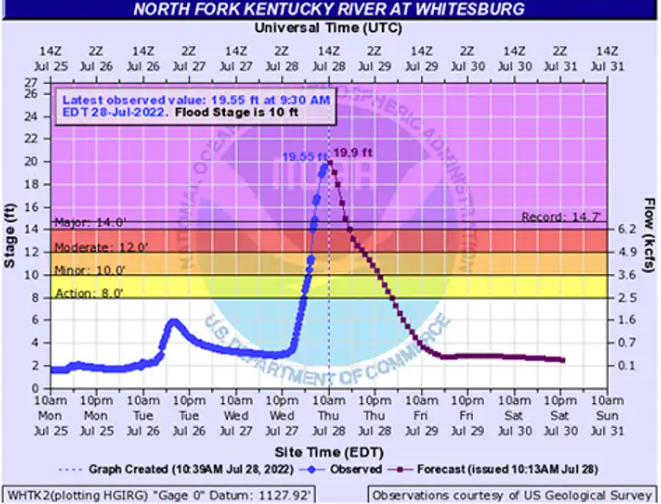
USGS river gauge for the North Fork of the Kentucky River in Whitesburg, showing water levels of almost 20 ft (6.1 m), exceeding the previous record level by over 5 ft (1.5 m).

Buckhorn in Perry County was inundated by Squabble Creek, a tributary of the Middle Fork of the Kentucky River, with numerous homes and Buckhorn School being completely flooded. The pavement was pulled up from the parking lot, and classrooms within the school building were destroyed ahead of the school's scheduled start date of August 11. Robinson Elementary in the Ary community of northern Perry County sustained exterior wall and roof collapse along Troublesome Creek, downstream of Hindman and Knott County. Further along the creek in Breathitt County, the community of Lost Creek was also inundated, with roads covered and homes swept off their foundations.

The Oneida community in Clay County was cut off by downed power lines and washed-out roads and bridges, with floodwater impacting many homes that had previously been flooded by an event in March 2020.

Parts of Floyd and Johnson counties were impacted by severe thunderstorms and flooding first on July 26, affecting homes and roads. More severe flooding occurred on July 28, with the towns of Martin, Wayland, and Garrett in Floyd County being among those impacted. Numerous water rescues were conducted, with people being taken to the Wayland Fire Department, among other places. KY 7, KY 122, and KY 550 in Floyd County were shut down due to floodwaters.

Pike County in far eastern Kentucky also sustained flooding, with multiple roads being blocked by downed trees and power lines as well. In the Virgie area, south of Pikeville, Shelby Creek overran its banks and inundated several homes, leading to the closure of KY 610 in the area.

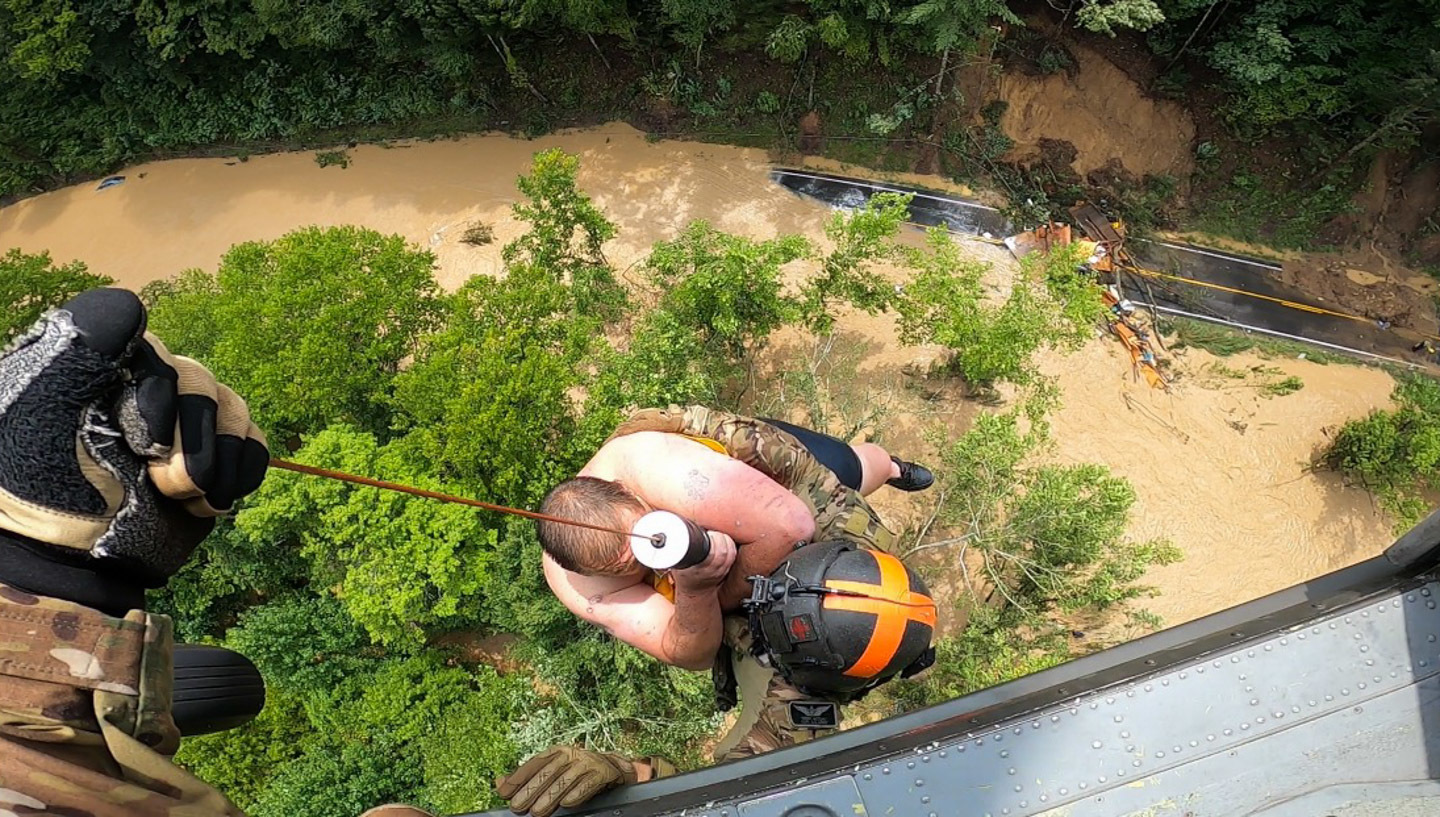
An airlift during the flood in Kentucky.

Late on July 28 and into July 29, part of the city of Jackson was evacuated and KY 15 was closed after officials became concerned that water from the North Fork River would top Panbowl Dam along KY 15 and potentially flood approximately 110 homes, 13 businesses, and other structures around Panbowl Lake, although the river began receding before the dam was overtopped. The North Fork River set a record crest in Jackson of 43.47 feet (13.25 m), besting the previous record of 43.1 feet (13.1 m) from February 4, 1939, while meteorologists at the National Weather Service forecast office in Jackson became trapped at the office due to nearby high water.

The fatality count from the event in Kentucky reached 38, with 17 deaths occurring in Knott County, nine in Breathitt County, seven in Perry County, three in Letcher County, and two in Clay County. A 39th fatality occurred in the days following the event due to an illness contracted during cleanup efforts. A 40th fatality occurred in September during cleanup efforts in Pike County.

University professors and data analysts described the extreme flooding as made more likely by climate change in the United States. Meteorologist Jeff Berardelli of WFLA in Tampa, Florida commented that the flooding in Kentucky was "simply in its own universe", and that an event that would happen on average one in a thousand years before global warming made its likelihood greater. The government's Fourth National Climate Assessment says that the heaviest precipitation events have intensified.

Criticism was lobbed at local mining companies for failing to return the land to its natural state after decades of mining caused the loss of the natural ridge lines and vegetation.

The rainfall observed over the region during July 25–30 was over 600 percent of normal totals. The four-day rainfall totals of 14–16 inches (360–410 mm) in some areas were reported to have a less than a 0.1 percent chance of occurring in any given year.

=== July 31 – August 1 ===
More rainfall over waterlogged areas led to more flooding on August 1 in Knott and Letcher counties. Downtown areas of Hindman and Fleming-Neon were again inundated by floodwaters in the early hours of August 1. KY 550 was again flooded in Knott County, affecting the communities of Mousie and Fisty, along with Hindman. Flooding was also reported in other areas such as Floyd County, Pike County, and Harlan County. Roads in Floyd County were flooded or blocked by downed trees and power lines.

As a result of flooding on July 28 and again on August 1, Fleming-Neon was left with its city hall, bank, pharmacy, and post office flooded, with more than a foot of mud covering the inside of the city hall building.

== Aftermath ==
On July 28, Kentucky Governor Andy Beshear commented, "We are currently experiencing one of the worst, most devastating flooding events in Kentucky's history." On July 29, President Joe Biden declared that a major disaster existed in Kentucky and ordered federal aid to supplement state and local recovery efforts in the areas affected by severe storms, flooding, landslides, and mudslides. Search and rescue efforts continued for days following the floods.

A shelter was opened on July 28 at the Breathitt County Courthouse in Jackson for displaced residents, as well as other shelters in schools and churches around Perry County and Hazard and the Floyd County Community Center near the town of Martin. Wolfe County, north of Jackson, opened three school buildings as shelters as well. About 150 residents were housed at nearby state parks, while at least another 150 went to American Red Cross shelters. Curfews were established in areas such as Hindman and Breathitt County after reports of looting.

Some residents in Kentucky were stuck in their homes, unable to leave because of washed-out roads and bridges, leading to over 420 people being rescued by helicopter or boat. By August 2, more than 5,600 customers in eastern Kentucky were still without power and more than 18,000 service connections were without water. An additional 45,600 customers were under a boil water advisory, according to Governor Beshear. Numerous people remained stranded in rural areas as a result of roads being washed away, with the only access in some instances being by ATV. The infrastructure problems caused difficulty in pinpointing the number of missing people in the days after the event.

The office manager of Troublesome Creek Stringed Instrument Company in Hindman set up a GoFundMe account for donations to help with flood relief, while Appalshop and Hindman Settlement School received help to keep valuable media archives refrigerated to prevent ruin. Some archives were transported to a freezer at East Tennessee State University in the days after the event.

School systems in Perry, Breathitt, and Floyd counties delayed the start of the school year due to recovery efforts. Several classrooms in Breathitt County were destroyed, along with the district's maintenance building and the bus garage. Several other counties in the area had modified starts to the school year as well.

The University of Kentucky men's basketball team announced plans to play two games against Gonzaga, in 2022 and 2023, to raise money for Kentucky flood relief.

As of August 2024, flood recovery efforts were still ongoing in some areas.

== See also ==
- 2016 West Virginia flood – another catastrophic flood event that occurred just to the east six years earlier.
- July–August 2022 United States floods – other flood events that occurred in the United States around the same time.
- February 2025 North American storm complex – another significant flood event that impacted the same areas almost three years later.
