= Fish trap (disambiguation) =

A fish trap is a trap used for fishing.

Fish trap or Fishtrap may also refer to:

- Fishtrap, Alabama, an unincorporated community in Talladega County
- Fishtrap, Kentucky, an unincorporated community located in Pike County
- Fishtrap, Washington, a ghost town
- Fishtrap Lake State Park, in Pike County, Kentucky
  - Fishtrap Lake, in the above park
- Fishtrap Cove, in Antarctica
