= Mousie =

Mousie or Mousey may refer to:

== Nickname ==
- Mousey Alexander (1922–1988), American jazz drummer
- Mary Baird (nurse) (1907–2009), Northern Irish nurse and health service administrator nicknamed "Mousie"
- Paul Garner (1909–2004), American actor nicknamed "Mousie"
- Diana Lewis (1919–1997), American actress nicknamed "Mousie", wife of actor William Powell
- Joseph "Mousie" Massimino (born c. 1951), an underboss of the Philadelphia crime family
- Bruce Strauss (born 1952), American retired boxer called "Mousie" during his school years
- Marcia "Mousie" Williams, a 2007 inductee into the United States Show Jumping Hall of Fame

== Other uses ==
- Mousie, Kentucky, United States, an unincorporated community
- Mousey, a 1974 Canadian film
- Mousie, a character in the 1993 American film Mi Vida Loca
- Mousie, winner of the 1868 Prix Vanteaux French horse race
