= Kentucky Route 610 =

State highway in Kentucky, United States

Kentucky Route 610
- KY 610 highlighted in red

Route information
- Maintained by KYTC
- Length: 8.944 mi (14.394 km)

Major junctions
- West end: KY 805 at Dorton
- East end: KY 122 near Virgie

Location
- Country: United States
- State: Kentucky
- Counties: Pike

Highway system
- Kentucky State Highway System; Interstate; US; State; Parkways
← KY 609	→ KY 611

Kentucky Route 610 (KY 610) is a 8.944-mile-long (14.394 km) state highway in Pike County, Kentucky, that runs from KY 805 at Dorton to KY 122 northwest of Virgie via Myra, Jonancy, Ellwood, and Virgie.

== Major intersections ==
The entire route is in Pike County.

Location	mi	km	Destinations	Notes
	0.000	0.000	KY 805	Western terminus
	1.065	1.714	KY 3527 south (Dr. Roy Sanders Memorial Highway)	Northern terminus of KY 3527
	7.969	12.825	KY 1469 east (Penny Highway)	West end of KY 1469 overlap
	8.323	13.395	KY 1469 west (Old Long Fork Road)	East end of KY 1469 overlap
	8.944	14.394	KY 122 (Indian Creek Road / Robinson Creek Road)	Eastern terminus
1.000 mi = 1.609 km; 1.000 km = 0.621 mi: Concurrency terminus
