= Kentucky Route 550 =

State highway in eastern Kentucky

Kentucky Route 550
- KY 550 highlighted in red

Route information
- Maintained by KYTC
- Length: 43.212 mi (69.543 km)
- Existed: c. 1979-80–present

Major junctions
- West end: KY 15 / KY 80 at Hazard
- KY 476 at Dwarf; KY 160 at Hindman; KY 7 at Lackey; KY 80 at Garrett
- East end: KY 80 / Judge Road at Eastern

Location
- Country: United States
- State: Kentucky
- Counties: Perry, Knott, Floyd

Highway system
- Kentucky State Highway System; Interstate; US; State; Parkways
← KY 549	→ KY 551

Kentucky Route 550 (KY 550) is a 43.212 miles (69.543 km) state highway in eastern Kentucky that runs from Kentucky Routes 15 and 80 in northwestern Hazard to Kentucky Route 80 and Judge Road in Eastern via Darfork, Dwarf, Fisty, Carrie, Hindman, Garner, Mousie, Lackey, Garrett, and Eastern.

== Route description ==
The route begins at an interchange-type junction of KY 80 and KY 15 at Hazard. It runs concurrently with KY 476 for most of its course through eastern Perry County. At Dwarf, KY 550 separates and moves into Knott County. It then goes to the county seat of Hindman, where it meets KY 160. It then has a runs concurrently with KY 7 after it enters Floyd County. It crosses KY 80 for the second time while concurrent with KY 7. KY 550 continues into southern Floyd County until reaching its eastern terminus at a third intersection with KY 80 at the town of Eastern.

== History ==
Most of KY 550 is an original, old alignment of KY 80. KY 550 was first designated along this roadway when KY 80 was rerouted to a four-lane divided highway on December 27, 1982.

The original KY 550 was in Carroll County, running from US 42 in Ghent to KY 1112 in Easterday. This was decommissioned by 1977, and the road was reinstated into the state highway system as KY 2949 in 1987.

== Major intersections ==
County	Location	mi	km	Destinations	Notes
Perry	Hazard	0.000– 0.104	0.000– 0.167	KY 15 / KY 80 (Combs Road)	Western terminus; continues as KY 80 west beyond KY 15 / KY 80 east
Perry		0.876	1.410	Park Avenue Connector (KY 3194 east)	Western terminus of KY 3194
Perry		2.497	4.019	KY 476 south (North Main Street) / KY 1440 south (Upper Second Creek Road)	West end of KY 476 overlap; northern terminus of KY 1440
Perry		3.455	5.560	KY 1088 east	Western terminus of KY 1088
Perry		4.443	7.150	KY 1146 south (Hardburly Road)	West end of KY 1146 overlap
Perry		4.768	7.673	KY 1146 north	East end of KY 1146 overlap
Perry		8.217	13.224	KY 476 north	East end of KY 476 overlap
Knott		9.551	15.371	KY 2102 north (Trace Branch Road)	Southern terminus of KY 2102
Knott	Fisty	10.473	16.855	KY 721 south	Northern terminus of KY 721
Knott		13.503	21.731	KY 1102 north (Montgomery Creek Road)	Southern terminus of KY 1102
Knott	Carrie	16.743	26.945	KY 3392 south (Mill Creek Road)	Northern terminus of KY 3392
Knott		18.033	29.021	KY 1231 south (Big Branch Road)	Northern terminus of KY 1231
Knott		18.923	30.454	KY 2759 north (Ogden Branch Road)	Southern terminus of KY 2759
Knott	Hindman	21.123	33.994	KY 160 east	West end of KY 160 overlap
Knott	Hindman	21.273	34.236	KY 160 west (Hindman Bypass)	East end of KY 160 overlap
Knott		23.123	37.213	KY 1098 west (Possum Trot Road)	Eastern terminus of KY 1098
Knott		24.993	40.222	KY 1697 east (Spruce Pine Road)	Western terminus of KY 1697
Knott	Mousie	31.057	49.981	KY 1087 west	Eastern terminus of KY 1087
Floyd	Lackey	36.264	58.361	KY 7 south	West end of KY 7 overlap
Floyd	Garrett	36.855	59.312	KY 777 north (Stone Coal Road)	West end of KY 777 overlap
Floyd	Garrett	37.124	59.745	KY 777 south (Bridge Street)	East end of KY 777 overlap
Floyd	Garrett	37.312	60.048	KY 80 Conn. to KY 80 – Hindman, Prestonsburg	
Floyd	Hueysville	38.821	62.476	KY 7 north (Raccoon Road)	East end of KY 7 overlap
Floyd		40.717	65.528	KY 850 north	Southern terminus of KY 850
Floyd	Eastern	42.765	68.824	To KY 80	
Floyd	Eastern	43.212	69.543	KY 80 / Judge Road	Eastern terminus; continues as Judge Road beyond KY 80
1.000 mi = 1.609 km; 1.000 km = 0.621 mi: Concurrency terminus
