= Kentucky Route 680 =

State highway in Kentucky, United States

Kentucky Route 680

Route information
- Maintained by KYTC
- Length: 18.728 mi (30.140 km)

Major junctions
- West end: KY 80 south-southeast of Eastern
- KY 122 in Minnie and McDowell
- East end: US 23 / US 460 / KY 80 in Harold

Location
- Country: United States
- State: Kentucky
- Counties: Floyd

Highway system
- Kentucky State Highway System; Interstate; US; State; Parkways
← KY 679	→ KY 681

Kentucky Route 680 (KY 680) is an 18.728-mile-long (30.140 km) state highway in Kentucky. KY 680's western terminus is at KY 80 south-southeast of Eastern, and the eastern terminus is at U.S. Route 23 (US 23), US 460 and KY 80 in Harold.

== History ==
KY 680 was formed in 1963.

The original KY 680 ran from KY 141 & KY 758 in Union County southeast and northeast to Bordley; this became part of KY 758 when it was extended.

== Major intersections ==
The entire route is in Floyd County.

Location	mi	km	Destinations	Notes
	0.000	0.000	KY 80	Western terminus
	2.640	4.249	KY 777 north	Western end of KY 777 concurrency
	2.884	4.641	KY 777 south	Eastern end of KY 777 concurrency
	4.166	6.705	KY 1086 south	Northern terminus of KY 1086
Minnie	5.026	8.089	KY 122 north	Western end of KY 122 concurrency
McDowell	6.773	10.900	KY 122 south	Eastern end of KY 122 concurrency
	7.668	12.340	KY 1929 south	Northern terminus of KY 1929
	12.214	19.657	KY 979 south	Western end of KY 979 concurrency
	14.871	23.933	KY 979 north	Eastern end of KY 979 concurrency
	15.640	25.170	KY 979 south	Western end of second KY 979 concurrency
	15.688	25.247	KY 979 north	Eastern end of second KY 979 concurrency
Harold	18.030	29.016	KY 979 south / KY 1426 east	Western end of KY 1426 concurrency; northern terminus of KY 979
Harold	18.185	29.266	KY 1426 west	Eastern end of KY 1426 concurrency
Harold	18.728	30.140	US 23 / US 460 / KY 80	Eastern terminus
1.000 mi = 1.609 km; 1.000 km = 0.621 mi: Concurrency terminus
