= WKVG =

WKVG may refer to:

- WKVG (FM), a radio station (94.5 FM) licensed to serve Greenville, South Carolina, United States
- WKVG (AM), a defunct radio station (1000 AM) formerly licensed to serve Jenkins, Kentucky, United States
- WFSH-FM, a radio station (105.1 FM) licensed to serve Sheffield, Pennsylvania, United States, which held the call sign WKVG in 2023
