= 1981 Allen shooting =

Mass shooting in Kentucky, US

- Location of the shooting in Floyd County, Kentucky
- Location: 37°37′48.9″N 82°43′12.42″W; 5359 KY-1428, Floyd County, Kentucky, US
- Date: October 16, 1981; 45 years ago c. 11:45 a.m. (EST; UTC−05:00)
- Attack type: Mass shooting; mass murder
- Weapon: Semi-automatic .30-caliber M1 carbine (never recovered)
- Deaths: 5
- Injuries: 4 (3 by gunfire)
- Perpetrator: William Owen "Okie" Bevins
- Motive: Personal grievance; Witness elimination

On October 16, 1981, a mass shooting occurred at the Mountain Truck Parts store near Allen, Kentucky, United States. Triggered by an extortion dispute with a local couple, 70-year-old William Owen "Okie" Bevins entered the business with an M1 carbine and opened fire, killing five people and injuring three others.

Bevins was arrested shortly after at his home. During his 1983 trial, he pleaded guilty to all charges and was sentenced to death. He died of a stroke in May 1989 before his sentence could be carried out.

== Background ==
In November 1929, Bevins, who was 18 years old at the time, was indicted by a Floyd County grand jury for a willful murder that reportedly took place at a local church social. In 1930, he was convicted of the capital offense and sentenced to life imprisonment. Bevins served eight years in prison and was paroled in July 1938.

Decades later, Bevins, then a retired coal miner, maintained an off-and-on relationship with Katie Sue Click. Click had known Bevins since she was seven years old, and testified that their sexual relationship began when she was 13 or 14. She received money from Bevins in exchange for sexual favors, but later stated he coerced her into continuing to see him once or twice a week for seven years through threats of violence, warning that he would kill her if she tried to end it.

Click testified she attempted to end the relationship twice, but Bevins threatened her family and threatened to use pornographic materials he forced her to produce to have her children taken away. According to her testimony, in the weeks leading up to the shooting, Bevins was growing angry over his increasing impotence and had started following and watching her and her husband everywhere. Four days before the shooting, Bevins brought a rifle with him to her house during his final visit.

== Shooting ==
At 11:30 a.m. October 16, 1981, Bevins waited on the front porch of the home of 28-year-old Roger Dale Click in Allen for Click, his 22-year-old wife Katie Sue, and their three children to return. According to the defense, the events of that morning were triggered by a financial dispute over sexual favors, an assertion Katie Sue strongly denied at trial. The defense claimed that days earlier, an initial price of $50 had been set over the phone for a sexual encounter with Katie Sue, which was subsequently raised to $100 after she informed Bevins that her husband insisted on the higher amount.

Later, upon arriving in their pickup truck across the street from the Mountain Truck Parts store, Roger Click allegedly demanded $200 instead. Bevins asked to pay the remaining $100 on credit, but Click refused. Bevins approached the right side of the truck, said, "I'm tired of people pushing me around," aimed a .30-caliber M1 carbine at Katie Sue's head, and threatened to kill the occupants if anyone exited. Katie Sue instructed Click to drive to the auto parts store to call the police.

At 11:45 a.m., Katie Sue hid her children behind the building, covering her baby with her sweater, before entering through a rear entrance. Meanwhile, Click entered through the front to use the telephone, followed shortly by Bevins stepping through the front door. Seeing Bevins enter, store co-owner Tommy Joe Reitz, who had seen the argument outside, began leaving the building as fast as he could. As he headed for the exit, Reitz passed Katie Sue, who asked him, "Where can I hide?" Reitz told her, "Upstairs." Bevins had planned to target Click and carried out the broader shooting inside the store to eliminate potential witnesses. Carrying an M1 carbine, equipped with a modified pistol grip and a 30-round magazine, at waist level, Bevins threatened to kill everyone among the roughly 15 people inside if Click did not hang up the phone.

Customer Rufus Hamilton, who knew Bevins, intervened, saying, "Now Okie, don't do that." Standing no more than two feet away, Bevins shot Hamilton in the chest. As he fell, Hamilton said, "Lord have mercy." Bevins then shot Click, who collapsed across the counter and fell to the floor. Customer Anderson Newsome, a friend of Hamilton, ran between the aisles, sustaining a bullet wound to the hip after being pushed out of the line of fire by another person. Newsome fled over an outside embankment alongside two other men, including Reitz, who suffered a sprained ankle from the 20-foot drop.

Store clerk Roger Dale Wright was shot through the right shoulder while running between two supply shelves toward a rear exit. Store employee Ronnie Bryant fled toward the rear to warn co-worker Michael Halbert. Finding the rear window too small for escape, Bryant and Halbert ran for the front entrance. Halbert, who also knew Bevins, raised his hands and said, "Peace brother, we don't want any trouble." Bevins shot Bryant in the chest and then shot Halbert, who fell onto Bryant.

Outside, Katie Sue saw Bevins shoot another man attempting to escape over boxes. Road salesman Julian Patrick hid in the aisles but encountered Bevins. Bevins asked Patrick if he knew him; when Patrick answered no, Bevins said, "I'm going to let you live, but if you ever think you know me, I'll come back and kill you," and allowed Patrick to hide.

Customer Charles May entered the store mid-attack and encountered Bevins near several bodies. May begged for his life. Bevins ordered him to the back of the store, systematically shooting any wounded victim who quivered on the floor as they walked. Bevins ordered May to hang up the phone Click had used. When it rang, Bevins forced May to answer, tell the caller the store was closed, and hang up. Bevins spared May, warning him not to report the incident.

Bevins walked through the store, shooting the wounded until all moaning stopped. He exited the building with his rifle and returned to his home in Printer, Kentucky, eight miles away. Upon arriving, he encountered 19-year-old Stanley Collins and 26-year-old Leroy Meredith Jr. Bevins confessed to the shooting and threatened, "I'll shoot you if you tell anybody."

Inside the store, employee Ronnie Bryant regained consciousness. Hearing the phone ring, Bryant crawled from under Halbert's body, answered it, and stated "Get an ambulance here. We've all been shot."

At 1:25 p.m., Kentucky State Police officers arrived at Bevins' home, where he sat on the front porch. As State Trooper Arnold Weddington approached with his drawn service revolver, Bevins offered no resistance, stating, "Why don't you just fucking shoot me? I'm 70 years old. It don't matter to me," and was taken into custody.

== Aftermath ==
Following the attack, Mountain Truck Parts remained closed for about a week while law enforcement officers conducted their investigation at the scene.

On June 19, 1984, the Mountain Truck Parts building was destroyed in an accidental fire that caused over $500,000 in damage. The blaze began during a routine trash-burning procedure outside, gutting the store's inventory and the upstairs apartment. Rendered irreparable, the structure was subsequently slated for demolition.

== Victims ==
Five people were killed at the scene. Autopsies performed on the deceased revealed a total of 26 gunshot wounds: Roger Hatfield was shot eight times, Rufus Hamilton seven times, Roger Click six times, Jarvey Hamilton three times, and Michael Halbert twice. Furthermore, the examinations established that each man had been shot at least once after falling from the initial burst of gunfire. Three others were injured by gunfire, sustaining one gunshot wound each, while another victim sprained his right ankle while fleeing. Investigators recovered 29 brass shell casings inside the store and found no bullet holes, confirming every fired round struck a victim.

=== Killed ===
- Rufus Hamilton, 42, of Ligon, Kentucky.
- Roger Dale Click, 28, of Allen, Kentucky.
- Michael Joe Halbert, 28, of Martin, Kentucky.
- Roger Hatfield, 34, of Mohawk, West Virginia.
- Jarvey Hamilton, 27, of Grethel, Kentucky.

=== Injured ===
- Ronnie Bryant, 24, of Hueysville, Kentucky.
- Anderson Newsome, 42, of Ligon, Kentucky.
- Roger Dale Wright, 23, of Emma, Kentucky.
- Tommy Joe Reitz, 26, of Allen, Kentucky.

== Trial and sentencing ==
Following his arrest on the afternoon of October 16, Bevins was charged with five counts of murder and held without bond. Bevins was initially taken to the Floyd County Jail in Prestonsburg, Kentucky, for questioning. A Floyd County judge later ordered Bevins to be transferred to Laurel County, Kentucky, for his own protection. State Attorney General Steven Beshear requested this move to protect Bevins from angry relatives of the victims.

On November 9, 1981, Bevins appeared in Laurel Circuit Court in London, Kentucky. He pleaded not guilty to all charges, which officially included five counts of murder and three counts of first-degree assault, and he continued to be held at the Laurel County Jail.

On January 15, 1982, a change of venue was granted for the trial. The defense argued that an impartial trial could not be held in Floyd County or adjoining counties due to extensive media coverage, the local popularity of the victims, and hostile community sentiment. The court subsequently ordered the case transferred to Greenup County, Kentucky.

In late May 1982, following a mental evaluation by a state psychiatrist that found Bevins competent to stand trial, the court scheduled the trial to begin on November 29, 1982, in Greenup Circuit Court, with prosecutors seeking the death penalty and ruling out plea bargaining. However, the trial was postponed in October 1982, initially being pushed to February 1983 at the request of defense attorney Lester Burns due to a scheduling conflict with another trial, and later rescheduled by the court to April 4, 1983.

The trial commenced on April 4, 1983, in Greenup Circuit Court before Judge James Donaldson Atkinson Jr. Following jury selection, a jury was seated on April 5, with all members expressing support for the death penalty. During opening arguments the following day, the defense pursued an insanity plea, alleging that Bevins had been the victim of "sexual extortion" by victim Roger Click and his wife, Katie Sue. The prosecution vigorously disputed this, countering that Bevins had forced an ongoing sexual relationship upon Katie Sue and refused to allow her to end it. The proceedings concluded abruptly later that afternoon. Following the testimony of the prosecution's first witness, surviving shooting victim Ronnie Bryant, Bevins withdrew his previous pleas and pleaded guilty to all five counts of murder and three counts of first-degree assault, leaving sentencing entirely to the court.

During the subsequent sentencing phase, Katie Sue Click testified that Bevins had initiated their relationship when she was a young teenager and threatened her life if she ended the affair. The defense and prosecution then presented conflicting psychiatric testimonies regarding whether Bevins suffered from an extreme emotional disturbance at the time of the killings. During closing arguments on April 12, the defense requested life sentences, arguing that a financial demand by the Clicks for sexual favors immediately preceding the shooting acted as a catalyst, while the prosecution urged the death penalty for a calculated crime. On April 22, 1983, Judge Atkinson formally sentenced Bevins to death in the electric chair for the five murders and remanded him to the Kentucky State Penitentiary in Eddyville, Kentucky. Because death sentences carry an automatic appeal to the state Supreme Court, no execution date was set.

On March 20, 1986, the Kentucky Supreme Court unanimously upheld Bevins's death sentence. The court rejected the defense's argument that Bevins did not fully understand the consequences of his guilty plea, noting that trial transcripts proved otherwise. Writing for the court, Justice Charles M. Leibson concluded that pleading guilty was a sound legal strategy; leaving the sentencing to a judge avoided a likely jury recommendation of death given the devastating testimony of the first witness and the "bizarre and sordid" details of Bevins's relationship with Katie Sue Click.

In August 1986, the Kentucky Supreme Court denied a request by Bevins to reconsider his death sentence. Following the decision, Paul Isaacs, head of the state Department of Public Advocacy, stated that defense attorneys would pursue additional appeals through either the U.S. Supreme Court or Greenup Circuit Court.

On January 27, 1987, the U.S. Supreme Court declined to hear an appeal regarding Bevins's murder convictions and death sentence. In his petition to the court, Bevins had challenged the voluntary nature of his 1983 guilty pleas and questioned how Kentucky law determines whether crimes are committed under "extreme emotional distress".

On the afternoon of May 20, 1989, Bevins, then the oldest death-row inmate in the United States, died of a stroke at Lourdes Hospital in Paducah, Kentucky. He had been transferred to the hospital from the Kentucky State Penitentiary earlier in the week suffering from abdominal pain and pneumonia.
