= Harold, Kentucky =

Unincorporated community in Kentucky, United States

- Unincorporated community
- Location within the state of Kentucky Harold (the United States)
- Coordinates: 37°32′12″N 82°38′00″W
- Country: United States
- State: Kentucky
- County: Floyd
- Elevation: 673 ft (205 m)
- Time zone: UTC-5 (Eastern (EST))
  - Summer (DST): UTC-4 (EDT)
- ZIP code: 41635
- Area code: 606
- GNIS feature ID: 493775

Harold is an unincorporated community located in Floyd County, Kentucky, United States.

== History ==
A post office was established in the community in 1905 and named for local merchant Harold Hatcher, a member of the Hatcher family and an early area settler.

On August 18, 2025, 33-year-old Henry Foster was fatally shot by Kentucky state troopers after they responded to an incident where they said he had threatened to harm himself with a gun beforehand.

== Geography ==
Harold is located on Kentucky Route 80, U.S. Route 460, Kentucky Route 680, and U.S. Route 23. It also has a northern terminus at Kentucky Route 979 and Kentucky Route 1426.

== Notable people ==
Professional baseball player Dixie Howell was born in Harold. The community was also home to Dean Mullins, one of the seven perpetrators of the Lillelid murders.

== Media ==
- WPRT-FM has a former "sister" station that moved to 105.3 FM, now using the call sign WXKZ, which is owned by Gearheart Communications in the community, and broadcasts an oldies format.
- WXLR is a radio station that airs a Classic rock music format and is stationed in the community. It also broadcasts the U of L Sports Network.
