= Mary Baird =

Mary Baird may refer to:

- Mary Baird Bryan (1861–1930), née Baird, American writer and suffragette, wife of Williams Jennings Bryan
- Mary Baird (nurse) (1907–2009), Northern Irish nurse and health service administrator
