= WIFX-FM =

- Jenkins, Kentucky; United States
- Broadcast area: Southeastern Kentucky; Southwestern Virginia
- Frequency: 94.3 MHz (HD Radio)
- Branding: Foxy 94.3

Programming
- Format: Hot adult contemporary
- Affiliations: Fox News Radio; PRN Radio

Ownership
- Owner: Gearhart Communications; (AJSPD, LLC)
- Sister stations: WXLR, WXKZ-FM

History
- First air date: May 10, 1975
- Former call signs: WREM-FM (1980–1981)
- Call sign meaning: "Foxy"

Technical information
- Licensing authority: FCC
- Facility ID: 37155
- Class: C2
- Power: 6,300 watts horizontal; 6,240 watts vertical
- HAAT: 410 meters (1,350 ft)
- Transmitter coordinates: 37°09′59.0″N 82°37′13.0″W

Links
- Public license information: Public file; LMS

WIFX-FM is a hot adult contemporary formatted broadcast radio station licensed to Jenkins, Kentucky, serving Southeastern Kentucky and Southwestern Virginia. WIFX is owned and operated by Gearhart Communications.

== History ==
The station went on the air as WREM-FM on May 10, 1975. As a newly launched companion station for WREM (AM 1000, later WKVG), it originally broadcast a variety format.

On November 23, 1981, the station changed its call sign to the current WIFX. It began airing a Top 40 format the same year. Sometime later in that decade, it began airing its current Hot AC format.

In May 2013, the station launched "Foxy and Friends", a local morning show to replace John Boy and Billy, which was moved to a sister station. "Foxy and Friends" features hosts Tiffany, Tim, and Jake.
