= Royville (disambiguation) =

Royville is a commune in Upper Normandy, France.

Royville may also refer to:

- Royville, Indiana, an unincorporated community
- Royville, Kentucky, a community in Russell County, Kentucky
