= Belcher, Kentucky =

Unincorporated community in Kentucky, United States

- Unincorporated community
- Location within Kentucky
- Coordinates: 37°20′30″N 82°22′25″W
- Country: United States
- State: Kentucky
- County: Pike
- Elevation: 778 ft (237 m)
- Time zone: UTC-5 (Eastern (EST))
  - Summer (DST): UTC-4 (EDT)
- ZIP code: 41513
- Area code: 606
- GNIS feature ID: 486774

Belcher is an unincorporated community in Pike County, Kentucky. Belcher is located at the junction of U.S. Route 460 and Kentucky Route 80 2.9 miles (4.7 km) north-northwest of Elkhorn City. Belcher has a post office with ZIP code 41513.

Belcher has been noted for its unusual place name.
