= Banner, Kentucky =

Unincorporated community in Kentucky, United States

- Unincorporated community
- Location within the state of Kentucky Banner (the United States)
- Coordinates: 37°35′57″N 82°42′5″W
- Country: United States
- State: Kentucky
- County: Floyd
- Elevation: 659 ft (201 m)
- Time zone: UTC-5 (Eastern (EST))
  - Summer (DST): UTC-4 (EST)
- ZIP codes: 41603
- GNIS feature ID: 507449

Banner is an unincorporated community in Floyd County, Kentucky, United States. It was also known as Mouth of Prater.

== History ==
A post office has been in operation at Banner since 1897. The community was named in honor of David Banner, a local settler.

== Geography ==
Banner lies at the intersection of Kentucky Route 80 and U.S. Route 23 at the western terminus of Kentucky Route 1426.
