= Dixie Howell (pitcher) =

American baseball player (1920–1960)

- Pitcher
- Born: January 7, 1920; Harold, Kentucky, U.S.
- Died: March 18, 1960 (aged 40); Hollywood, Florida, U.S.
- Batted: Left Threw: Right

MLB debut
- September 14, 1940, for the Cleveland Indians

Last MLB appearance
- April 26, 1958, for the Chicago White Sox

MLB statistics
- Win–loss record: 19–15
- Earned run average: 3.78
- Innings pitched: 226 1/3
- Stats at Baseball Reference

Teams
- Cleveland Indians (1940); Cincinnati Reds (1949); Chicago White Sox (1955–1958)

Millard Filmore "Dixie" Howell (January 7, 1920 – March 18, 1960) was an American relief pitcher who played in six Major League Baseball seasons between 1940 and 1958, as well as 19 years in the minors. Listed at 6 ft 2 in (1.88 m), 210 lb., Howell batted left-handed and threw right-handed. A native of Harold, Kentucky, he grew up in Dehue, West Virginia.

== Career ==
Howell spent three years in the Cleveland Indians' minor league system (1937–39) before joining the big team in 1940. While in the minors, he set a record in the Eastern League by striking out 20 batters in a single game (1939). In three relief appearances for the Indians, he posted a 1.80 earned run average in five innings pitched and did not have a decision.

In 1943, Howell was purchased by the Cincinnati Reds and assigned to the International League. He helped the Syracuse Chiefs clinch the league pennant with a 13–9 mark and was promoted to the major league roster for the next season. But in November 1943, he entered military service with the U.S. Army. He served in France and Belgium during World War II and was taken prisoner by the German troops in September 1944, being liberated by advancing Allied forces six months later.

Howell went to spring training with Cincinnati in 1946, playing for Syracuse for the next four years. He had a 17–12 record with the Chiefs in 1948, and appeared in five games with the Reds in 1949.

In 1950, Howell was purchased by the New York Giants and assigned to the Minneapolis Millers of the American Association. He enjoyed a fine season with the Millers, going 14–2 during the regular season and pitching a no-hitter against Columbus on August 10. He was sold to Philadelphia Phillies on January 20, returned to the Giants on May 15, purchased by the Chicago White Sox a week later, and assigned to the Memphis Chicks of the Southern Association.

Howell remained with the Chicks in 1953 and 1954, before returning to major league action in 1955 with the White Sox as an experienced relief specialist, and for the next four years. His most productive season came in 1955, when he recorded career-highs in wins (8), earned run average (2.93), saves (9), games finished (25) and innings (73 2/3).

In a six-season career, Howell posted a 19–15 record with a 3.78 earned run average and 19 saves in 115 appearances, including 99 strikeouts, 103 walks, two starts, 68 games finished and 226 1/3 innings of work. He also helped himself with the bat, hitting a .243 average (18-for-74) with five home runs and nine run batted in in 124 games, including two doubles, one triple, eight runs, and a .500 slugging percentage.

After that, Howell pitched for the Indianapolis Indians of the American Association in 1958 and 1959. He died at age 40 after suffering a heart attack while running at the Indians' 1960 spring training camp in Hollywood, Florida.
