= Wayland, Kentucky =

City in Floyd County, Kentucky, United States

- City
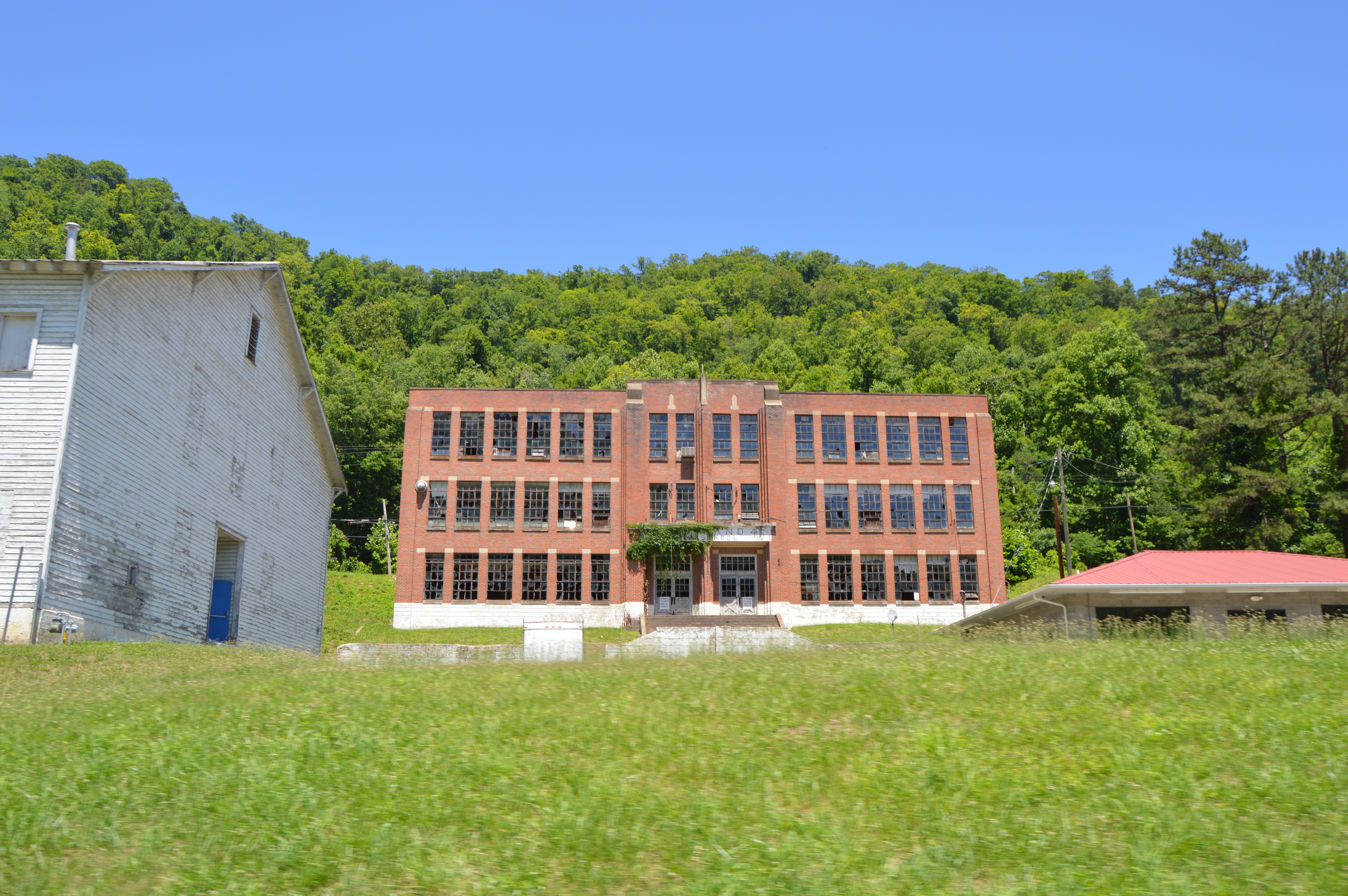
- The former Wayland High School

- Location of Wayland in Floyd County, Kentucky.
- Coordinates: 37°27′03″N 82°47′59″W
- Country: United States
- State: Kentucky
- County: Floyd
- Incorporated: 1923

Government
  - Type: City Commission
  - Mayor: Jerry Fultz

Area
  - Total: 2.71 sq mi (7.02 km^{2})
  - Land: 2.71 sq mi (7.01 km^{2})
  - Water: 0 sq mi (0.00 km^{2})
- Elevation: 1,161 ft (354 m)

Population (2020)
  - Total: 389
  - Density: 143.6/sq mi (55.45/km^{2})
- Time zone: UTC-5 (Eastern (EST))
  - Summer (DST): UTC-4 (EDT)
- ZIP code: 41666
- Area code: 606
- FIPS code: 21-81012
- GNIS feature ID: 2405695

Wayland is a home rule-class city in Floyd County, Kentucky, United States. As of the 2020 census, Wayland had a population of 389.

== History ==
In 1911, the Elk Horn Coal Company established a coal camp at the confluence of Steele Creek and the Right Fork of Beaver Creek. This place had been known as “Martin’s Mill” since before the start of the Civil War, due to Rev. “Old” John Martin's Grist Mill, which was located on Mill Creek. During the Civil War, after the Battle of Middle Creek, Confederate General Humphrey Marshall and his forces camped there at the mill, while on their way back to Virginia. During the period of 1911 to 1914 the coal camp was called different names, including “Camp Steele Creek” and “Watson Town.” They later named this place Wayland, after Clarence Wayland Watson, the president of the company. In April 1914 the railroad arrived, and on May 18, the town post office was established. The coal camp's construction wasn't completed until the early 1920s. Wayland was incorporated as a sixth-class city in 1923.

On July 28, 2022, Wayland, as well as many other places in eastern Kentucky, was hit by devastating flash flooding.

== Geography ==
Wayland is located in southwestern Floyd County in the valleys of the Right Fork Beaver Creek and its tributary, Steele Creek. Kentucky Route 7 passes through the city, leading north (downstream along the Right Fork) 3.5 miles (5.6 km) to Garrett and south (upstream) 9 miles (14 km) to Topmost.

According to the United States Census Bureau, the city has a total area of 2.6 square miles (6.8 km^{2}), all land.

== Education ==
The city's public schools are operated by the Floyd County Schools system. Most students residing in Wayland attend: Duff-Allen Central Elementary School and Floyd Central High School.

== Demographics ==
Historical population
Census	Pop.	Note	%±
1920	1,862		—
1930	2,436		30.8%
1940	2,888		18.6%
1950	1,807		−37.4%
1960	1,340		−25.8%
1970	384		−71.3%
1980	601		56.5%
1990	359		−40.3%
2000	298		−17.0%
2010	426		43.0%
2020	389		−8.7%
U.S. Decennial Census

At the 2000 census there were 298 people, 118 households, and 86 families living in the city. The population density was 430.6 inhabitants per square mile (166.3/km^{2}). There were 133 housing units at an average density of 192.2 per square mile (74.2/km^{2}). The racial makeup of the city was 99.66% White, and 0.34% from two or more races. Of the 118 households 32.2% had children under the age of 18 living with them, 55.9% were married couples living together, 15.3% had a female householder with no husband present, and 27.1% were non-families. 25.4% of households were one person and 13.6% were one person aged 65 or older. The average household size was 2.53 and the average family size was 3.07.

The age distribution was 26.5% under the age of 18, 10.1% from 18 to 24, 25.2% from 25 to 44, 23.8% from 45 to 64, and 14.4% 65 or older. The median age was 35 years. For every 100 females, there were 88.6 males. For every 100 females age 18 and over, there were 79.5 males.

The median household income was $14,688 and the median family income was $20,938. Males had a median income of $24,625 versus $25,625 for females. The per capita income for the city was $7,886. About 30.4% of families and 38.4% of the population were below the poverty line, including 59.6% of those under the age of eighteen and 36.7% of those sixty five or over.
