= Kentucky Route 122 =

State highway in Kentucky, United States

Kentucky Route 122

Route information
- Maintained by KYTC
- Length: 51.427 mi (82.764 km)

Major junctions
- South end: KY 114 near Prestonsburg
- KY 80 near Martin
- North end: US 460 / KY 80 near Shelbiana

Location
- Country: United States
- State: Kentucky
- Counties: Floyd, Pike

Highway system
- Kentucky State Highway System; Interstate; US; State; Parkways
← KY 121	→ KY 123

Kentucky Route 122 (KY 122) is a 51.427-mile-long (82.764 km) state highway in Kentucky. It runs from KY 114 east of Prestonsburg to U.S. Route 460 (US 460) west of Shelbiana.

== Future ==
Currently, KY 122 ends at US 460 and KY 80 on the banks of the Levisa Fork of the Big Sandy River. However, a new route for US 460 is under construction to the south. It is unknown where KY 122 will end at once the new highway is complete.

== Major intersections ==
County	Location	mi	km	Destinations	Notes
Floyd		0.000	0.000	KY 114	Western terminus
Floyd		8.520	13.712	KY 80 east	West end of KY 80 overlap
Floyd	Martin	8.702	14.005	KY 3190 south (River Bottom Road) / Reynolds Lane	Northern terminus of KY 3190
Floyd	Martin	8.978	14.449	KY 80 Spur east (The New Bridge)	Western terminus of KY 80 Spur
Floyd	Martin	9.814	15.794	KY 80 west	East end of KY 80 overlap
Floyd	Martin	9.937	15.992	KY 1428 north (Main Street)	Southern terminus of KY 1428
Floyd	Printer	12.334	19.850	KY 2030 east	Western terminus of KY 2030
Floyd	Drift	16.942	27.266	KY 1101 south (Turner Road)	Northern termimus of KY 1101
Floyd	Minnie	18.225	29.330	KY 680 west	West end of KY 680 overlap
Floyd	McDowell	19.972	32.142	KY 680 east	East end of KY 680 overlap
Floyd	Hi Hat	27.243	43.843	KY 979 north	Southern terminus of KY 979
Floyd		29.060	46.768	KY 1091 west	Eastern terminus of KY 1091
Floyd		29.770	47.910	KY 1498 south	Northern terminus of KY 1498
Floyd		31.030	49.938	KY 306 south	Northern terminus of KY 306
Floyd	Melvin	32.434	52.197	KY 466 south	Northern terminus of KY 466
Pike		40.685	65.476	KY 610 west	Eastern terminus of KY 610
Pike		42.285	68.051	KY 3415 north (Little Robinson Creek)	Southern terminus of KY 3415
Pike		45.855	73.796	KY 2167 north to US 23 / US 119	Southern terminus of KY 2167
Pike		51.167	82.345	KY 2552 east (Shelby Dry Fork)	Western terminus of KY 2552
Pike		51.427	82.764	US 460 / KY 80 (Shelbiana Road)	Eastern terminus
1.000 mi = 1.609 km; 1.000 km = 0.621 mi: Concurrency terminus
