= Bob Conley (baseball) =

American baseball player (1934–2022)

- Pitcher
- Born: February 1, 1934; Mousie, Kentucky, U.S.
- Died: February 14, 2022 (aged 88); Whiting, New Jersey, U.S.
- Batted: Right Threw: Right

MLB debut
- September 11, 1958, for the Philadelphia Phillies

Last MLB appearance
- September 16, 1958, for the Philadelphia Phillies

MLB statistics
- Win–loss record: 0–0
- Earned run average: 7.56
- Innings pitched: 8 1/3
- Stats at Baseball Reference

Teams
- Philadelphia Phillies (1958)

Robert Burns Conley (February 1, 1934 – February 14, 2022) was an American professional baseball starting pitcher, who played in Major League Baseball (MLB) briefly for the 1958 Philadelphia Phillies. Listed at 6 ft 1 in (1.85 m), 188 lb (85 kg), he batted and threw right-handed.

A native of Mousie, Kentucky, Conley started two big league games in the closing weeks of the 1958 season. In his MLB debut, he allowed three earned runs in seven innings of work against the Los Angeles Dodgers but left the game for a pinch hitter trailing, 3–1. (The Phils rallied to win for reliever Turk Farrell, by scoring three runs in the eighth inning.) But in his second start, the Chicago Cubs knocked Conley out of the game in the second inning by scoring four runs off him on three singles and a base on balls.

All told, Conley's major league stat line includes seven runs and nine hits allowed, in two starts, yielding one walk with no strikeouts, in 8 1/3 innings of work, for a 7.56 earned run average (ERA). He did not have a decision.

Conley played eight years (1953–60) of Minor League Baseball (MiLB), all but one game spent in the Phillies' organization, and won 68 out of 121 decisions (.562).

Conley died in Whiting, New Jersey on February 14, 2022, aged 88.

== See also ==
- 1958 Philadelphia Phillies season
- Philadelphia Phillies all-time roster
