= Kentucky Route 979 =

State highway in Kentucky, United States

Kentucky Route 979
- KY 979 highlighted in red

Route information
- Maintained by KYTC
- Length: 18.671 mi (30.048 km)

Major junctions
- South end: KY 122 north-northeast of Buckingham
- North end: KY 680 / KY 1426 in Harold

Location
- Country: United States
- State: Kentucky
- Counties: Floyd

Highway system
- Kentucky State Highway System; Interstate; US; State; Parkways
← KY 978	→ KY 980

Kentucky Route 979 (KY 979) is an 18.671-mile-long (30.048 km) state highway in Kentucky. KY 979's southern terminus is at KY 122 north-northeast of Buckingham, and the northern terminus is at KY 680 and KY 1426 in Harold

== Major intersections ==
The entire route is in Floyd County.

Location	mi	km	Destinations	Notes
	0.000	0.000	KY 122	Southern terminus
	7.208	11.600	KY 3380 west	Eastern terminus of KY 3380
	11.421	18.380	KY 680 west	Southern end of KY 680 concurrency
	14.081	22.661	KY 680 east	Northern end of KY 680 concurrency
	14.154	22.779	KY 3379 south	Northern terminus of KY 3379
	15.511	24.963	KY 680 west	Southern end of second KY 680 concurrency
	15.623	25.143	KY 680 east	Northern end of second KY 680 concurrency
	17.792	28.633	KY 1426 east	Southern end of KY 1426 concurrency
Harold	18.671	30.048	KY 680 / KY 1426 west	Northern terminus, northern end of KY 1426 concurrency
1.000 mi = 1.609 km; 1.000 km = 0.621 mi
