= Kentucky Route 1426 =

State highway in Kentucky, United States

Kentucky Route 1426
- KY 1426 highlighted in red

Route information
- Maintained by KYTC
- Length: 34.708 mi (55.857 km)

Major junctions
- West end: US 23 in Banner
- KY 680 southwest of Harold; US 23 / US 119 / US 460 / KY 80 in Pikeville; KY 194 southwest of Meta
- East end: US 119 east-northeast of Meta

Location
- Country: United States
- State: Kentucky
- Counties: Floyd, Pike

Highway system
- Kentucky State Highway System; Interstate; US; State; Parkways
← KY 1425	→ KY 1427

Kentucky Route 1426 (KY 1426) is a 34.708-mile-long (55.857 km) state highway in Kentucky. KY 1426's western terminus is at U.S. Route 23 (US 23) in Banner, and the eastern terminus is at US 119 east-northeast of Meta

== Major intersections ==
County	Location	mi	km	Destinations	Notes
Floyd	Banner	0.000	0.000	US 23	Western terminus
Floyd		6.404	10.306	KY 2030 west	Eastern terminus of KY 2030
Floyd		7.684	12.366	KY 680 east	Western end of KY 680 concurrency
Floyd		7.928	12.759	KY 680 west / KY 979 south	Eastern end of KY 680 concurrency, northern terminus of KY 979
Floyd		8.807	14.173	KY 979 south	Eastern end of KY 979 concurrency
Pike		17.502	28.167	KY 3417 north	Southern terminus of KY 3417
Pike		17.836	28.704	KY 3416 west	Eastern terminus of KY 3416
Pike	Pikeville	19.391	31.207	US 23 south / US 119 south / US 460 east / KY 80 east	Western end of US 23, US 119, US 460 and KY 80 concurrency
Pike	Pikeville	19.513	31.403	KY 3496 north	Southern terminus of KY 3496
Pike	Pikeville	20.028	32.232	US 23 north / US 119 north / US 460 west / KY 80 west	Eastern end of US 23, US 119, US 460 and KY 80 concurrency, interchange
Pike	Pikeville	21.243	34.187	KY 3496	
Pike	Pikeville	21.963	35.346	KY 1460 east	Western end of KY 1460 concurrency
Pike	Pikeville	22.378	36.014	KY 1460 west	Eastern end of KY 1460 concurrency
Pike		25.414	40.900	US 119 south	Western end of US 119 concurrency
Pike		25.536	41.096	US 119 north	Eastern end of US 119 concurrency, interchange
Pike		27.931	44.951	KY 1441 south	Northern terminus of KY 1441
Pike		31.042	49.957	KY 194 west	Western end of KY 194 concurrency
Pike		31.953	51.423	KY 194 east	Eastern end of KY 194 concurrency
Pike		32.842	52.854	KY 2169 south	Northern terminus of KY 2169
Pike		34.707	55.856	US 119	Eastern terminus, interchange
1.000 mi = 1.609 km; 1.000 km = 0.621 mi: Concurrency terminus
