= Langley, Kentucky =

Unincorporated community in Kentucky, United States

- Unincorporated community
- Location within the state of Kentucky Langley (the United States)
- Coordinates: 37°31′54″N 82°47′27″W
- Country: United States
- State: Kentucky
- County: Floyd
- Elevation: 656 ft (200 m)
- Time zone: UTC-5 (Eastern (EST))
  - Summer (DST): UTC-4 (EST)
- ZIP codes: 41645
- GNIS feature ID: 495981

Langley is an unincorporated community in Floyd County, Kentucky, United States. It corresponds to the Maytown census-designated place.

== History ==
A season five episode of My Ghost Story documented paranormal activity at a private residence in Langley.

== Geography ==
Langley is on Kentucky Route 80 and Kentucky Route 777. It is also on Kentucky Route 2554.

== Notable people ==
- Andrew J. May, lawyer and former member of the Kentucky U.S. House of Representatives.
- Bob Tallent, guard for the 1965–66 Kentucky Wildcats men's basketball team.
