= Lackey, Kentucky =

Unincorporated community in Kentucky, United States

- Unincorporated community
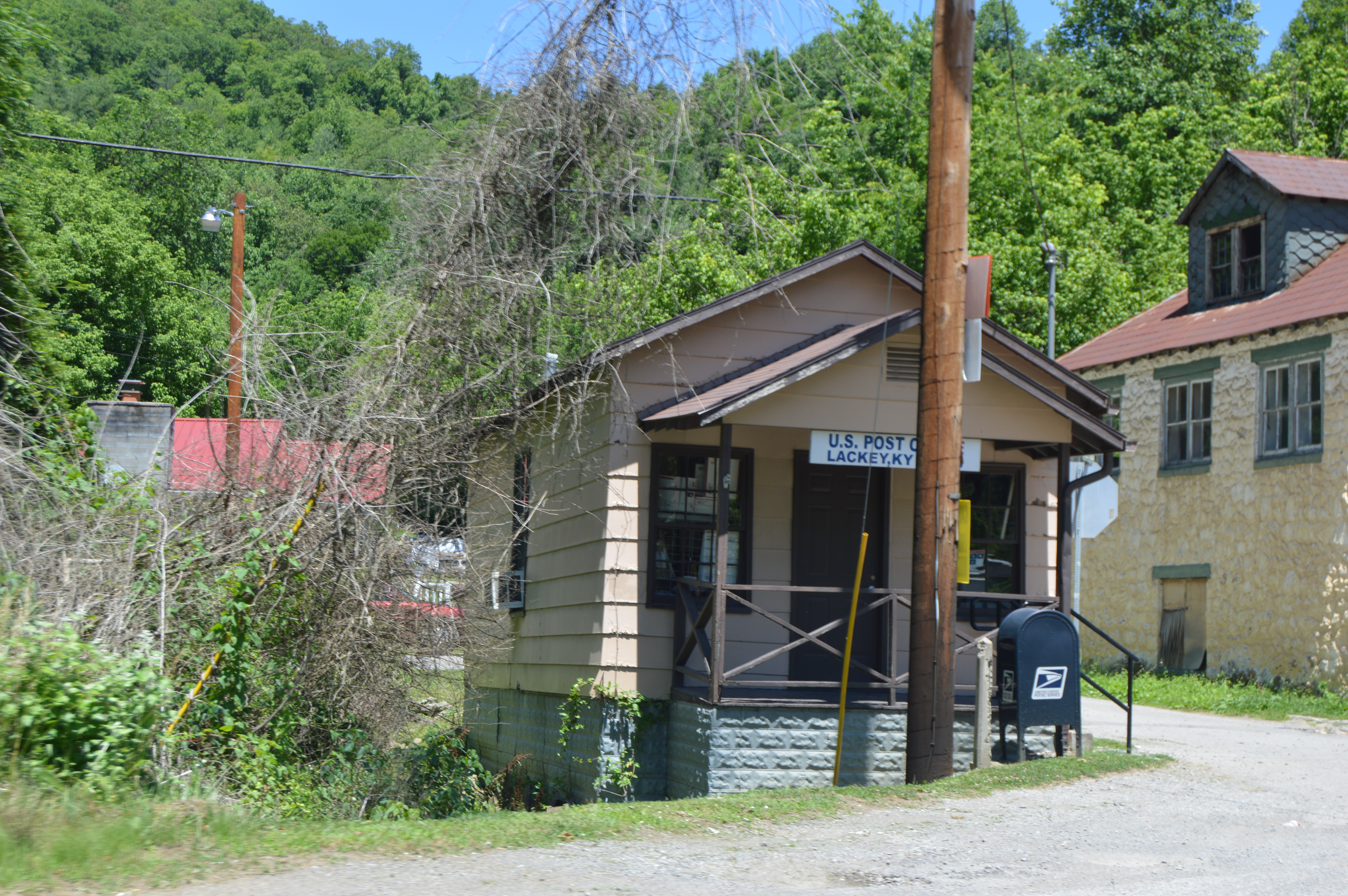
- Lackey post office

- Location within the state of Kentucky Lackey (the United States)
- Coordinates: 37°28′6″N 82°49′44″W
- Country: United States
- State: Kentucky
- County: Floyd
- Elevation: 827 ft (252 m)
- Time zone: UTC-5 (Eastern (EST))
  - Summer (DST): UTC-4 (EST)
- ZIP codes: 41643
- GNIS feature ID: 495888

Lackey is an unincorporated community in Floyd County, Kentucky, United States. Lackey was home to a pack horse library as part of the Pack Horse Library Project in the late 1930s and early 1940s.

== Geography ==
Lackey is located on Kentucky Route 80, Kentucky Route 7, and the southern end of the Kentucky Route 550 overlap.
