= Minnie, Kentucky =

Unincorporated community in Kentucky, United States

- Unincorporated community
- Location within the state of Kentucky Minnie (the United States)
- Coordinates: 37°28′20″N 82°45′15″W
- Country: United States
- State: Kentucky
- County: Floyd
- Elevation: 702 ft (214 m)
- Time zone: UTC-5 (Eastern (EST))
  - Summer (DST): UTC-4 (EST)
- ZIP codes: 41651
- GNIS feature ID: 498414

Minnie is an unincorporated community in Floyd County, Kentucky, United States.

The community was so named because a large share of the first settlers were miners.

== Geography ==
Minnie is located on Kentucky Route 122 at the west end of the Kentucky Route 680 overlap. It is also on Kentucky Route 1086.
