= WXLR =

- Harold, Kentucky; United States
- Frequency: 104.9 MHz
- Branding: 104.9 The X

Programming
- Format: Classic rock

Ownership
- Owner: Adam D. Gearheart
- Sister stations: WIFX, WXKZ

History
- First air date: 1994

Technical information
- Licensing authority: FCC
- Facility ID: 440
- Class: A
- ERP: 370 watts
- HAAT: 281 meters (923 feet)
- Transmitter coordinates: 37°31′59″N 82°29′40″W

Links
- Public license information: Public file; LMS

WXLR (104.9 FM, "The X") is a radio station licensed to serve Harold, Kentucky. The station is owned by Adam D. Gearheart. It airs a Classic rock music format.

The station has been assigned these call letters by the Federal Communications Commission since November 10, 1993.
