= Fishtrap Lake State Park =

State park in Kentucky, United States

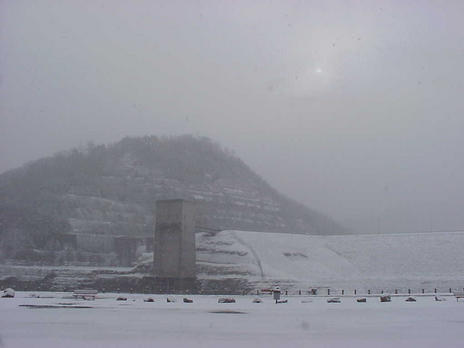
- Fishtrap Lake and dam during a winter storm

- Location within Kentucky Location within the United States
- Type: Kentucky state park
- Location: Pike County, Kentucky
- Coordinates: 37°26′06″N 82°25′10″W
- Area: 300 acres (120 ha)
- Created: 2003
- Operator: Kentucky Department of Parks
- Open: Year-round
- Website: Official website

Fishtrap Lake State Park was a park located southeast of Pikeville, Kentucky in Pike County. The park opened to the public in 2003. Fishtrap Lake, the park's main feature, covers approximately 1,130 acres (460 ha).
