= Meta, Kentucky =

Unincorporated community in Kentucky, United States

- Unincorporated community
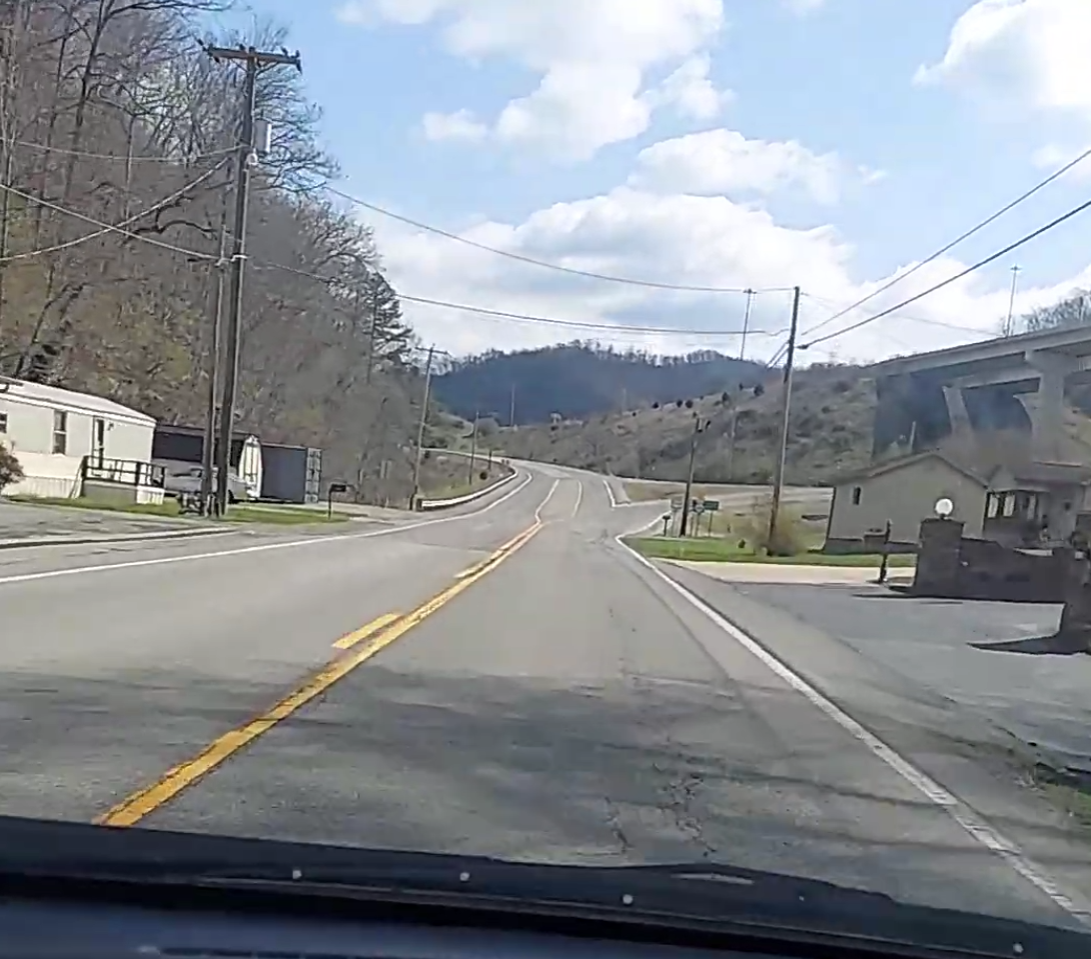
- Looking east, the interchange between Bent Branch Road and US 119 in Meta

- Location within Kentucky
- Coordinates: 37°34′13″N 82°26′15″W
- Country: United States
- State: Kentucky
- County: Pike
- Elevation: 748 ft (228 m)
- Time zone: UTC-5 (Eastern (EST))
  - Summer (DST): UTC-4 (EDT)
- Area code: 606
- GNIS feature ID: 498086

Meta is an unincorporated community in Pike County, Kentucky. Meta is located at the junction of Kentucky Route 1426 and Kentucky Route 2169 7.7 miles (12.4 km) northeast of Pikeville. The community had a post office from 1896 to 1959.

== Climate ==
The climate in this area is characterized by hot, humid summers and generally mild to cool winters. According to the Köppen Climate Classification system, Meta has a humid subtropical climate, abbreviated "Cfa" on climate maps.
