= Farmington, Kentucky =

Census-designated place in Kentucky, United States

- Census-designated place
- Location within Kentucky Location within the United States
- Coordinates: 36°40′13″N 88°31′25″W
- Country: United States
- State: Kentucky
- County: Graves

Area
  - Total: 1.55 sq mi (4.01 km^{2})
  - Land: 1.53 sq mi (3.97 km^{2})
  - Water: 0.015 sq mi (0.04 km^{2})
- Elevation: 554 ft (169 m)

Population (2020)
  - Total: 234
  - Density: 152.6/sq mi (58.91/km^{2})
- Time zone: UTC-6 (Central (CST))
  - Summer (DST): UTC-5 (CDT)
- ZIP Code: 42040
- Area codes: 270 & 364
- GNIS feature ID: 2629616

Farmington is an unincorporated community and census-designated place (CDP) in Graves County, Kentucky, United States. Farmington is located 8 miles (13 km) southeast of Mayfield, the Graves County seat, and 13 miles (21 km) west of Murray. As of the 2020 census, Farmington had a population of 234.

Farmington was laid out in 1836 and named for the fertile land and rustic setting.

Farmington was home to Farmington High School until 1986 when the six remaining high schools of the county combined to form Graves County High School. Farmington Elementary School is located near central Farmington. Farmington Elementary School is ranked among the highest in the state, receiving a National Blue Ribbon award in 2007. Farmington Elementary School spends $4,477 per student; the average school expenditure in the U.S. is $6,058. There are about 18 students per teacher in Farmington.

== Demographics ==
Historical population
Census	Pop.	Note	%±
2020	234		—
U.S. Decennial Census
