= Garrett, Floyd County, Kentucky =

Unincorporated community in Kentucky, United States

Garrett, Kentucky
- Unincorporated community
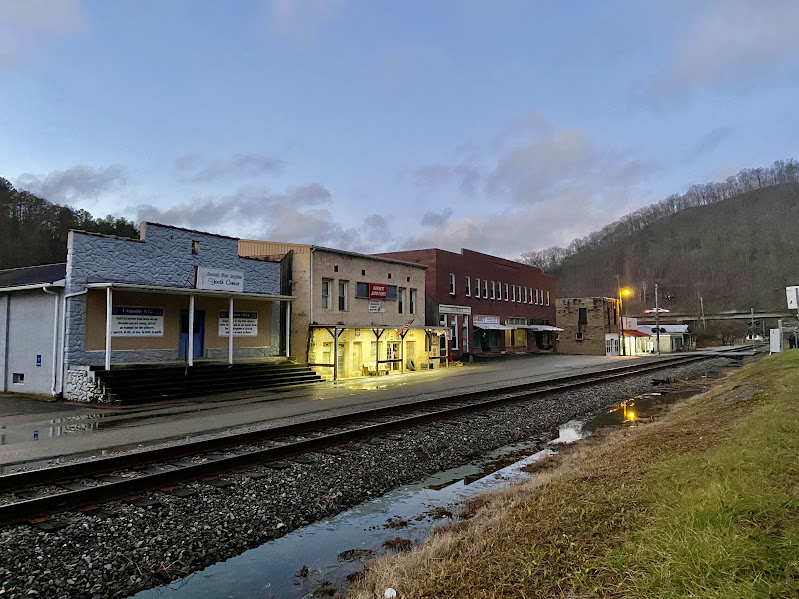
- Front Street in Garrett

- Location within the state of Kentucky Garrett (the United States)
- Coordinates: 37°28′47″N 82°49′54″W
- Country: United States
- State: Kentucky
- County: Floyd
- Elevation: 876 ft (267 m)
- Time zone: UTC-5 (Eastern (EST))
  - Summer (DST): UTC-4 (EST)
- ZIP codes: 41630
- GNIS feature ID: 492717

Garrett is an unincorporated community and coal town in Floyd County, Kentucky, United States.

== History ==
The Elk Horn Coal Company founded the town. It was home to an Old Regular Baptist church named Stone Coal Church, which was one of the New Salem Association's oldest churches. It was divided into two bodies when its delegates walked out.

A post office was established in 1910 and named "Ballard". In 1914, the name was changed to Garrett in honor of brothers John and Robert Garrett, both Baltimore bankers and coal company financiers.

Between July 26 and July 28, during the 2022 Appalachian floods, the nearby town of Jackson recorded eight inches of precipitation, leading to widespread destruction and loss of life in and around Garrett.

== Geography ==
Garrett is located at the intersection of Kentucky Route 80 and Kentucky Route 7. It is also on Kentucky Route 550 and Kentucky Route 777. The CSX E&BV Subdivision also passes through the center of town between Front Street and State Route 7.

== Notable person ==
Resident Jeremy Hall served as a guard during the 1995–96 Wisconsin Badgers men's basketball team.
