= Myra, Kentucky =

Unincorporated community in Kentucky, United States

Myra
- Unincorporated community
- Location within the state of Kentucky Myra (the United States)
- Coordinates: 37°17′23″N 82°36′00″W
- Country: United States
- State: Kentucky
- County: Pike
- Elevation: 961 ft (293 m)
- Time zone: UTC-5 (Eastern (EST))
  - Summer (DST): UTC-4 (EDT)
- ZIP codes: 41549
- GNIS feature ID: 508667

Myra is an unincorporated community located in Pike County, Kentucky, United States.
