= Kentucky Route 777 =

State highway in Kentucky, United States

Kentucky Route 777
- KY 777 highlighted in red

Route information
- Maintained by KYTC
- Length: 9.463 mi (15.229 km)

Major junctions
- South end: KY 80 in Garrett
- KY 7 by Garrett
- North end: KY 2554 west of Langley

Location
- Country: United States
- State: Kentucky
- Counties: Floyd

Highway system
- Kentucky State Highway System; Interstate; US; State; Parkways
← KY 776	→ KY 778

Kentucky Route 777 (KY 777) is a 9.463-mile-long (15.229 km) state highway in Kentucky. KY 680's southern terminus is at KY 80 in Garrett, and the northern terminus is at KY 2554 west of Langley

== Major intersections ==
The entire route is in Floyd County.

Location	mi	km	Destinations	Notes
Garrett	0.000	0.000	KY 80	Southern terminus
	0.289	0.465	KY 7 north	Southern end of KY 7 concurrency
	0.558	0.898	KY 7 south	Northern end of KY 7 concurrency
	4.227	6.803	KY 680 east	Southern end of KY 680 concurrency
	4.471	7.195	KY 680 west	Northern end of KY 680 concurrency
	8.533	13.733	KY 80	
	9.463	15.229	KY 2554	Northern terminus
1.000 mi = 1.609 km; 1.000 km = 0.621 mi: Concurrency terminus
