= Fishtrap, Kentucky =

Unincorporated community in Kentucky, United States

Fishtrap
- Unincorporated community
- Location within the state of Kentucky Fishtrap (the United States)
- Coordinates: 37°26′7″N 82°24′16″W
- Country: United States
- State: Kentucky
- County: Pike
- Elevation: 722 ft (220 m)
- Time zone: UTC-5 (Eastern (EST))
  - Summer (DST): UTC-4 (EDT)
- ZIP codes: 41525
- GNIS feature ID: 2120629

Fishtrap was an unincorporated community located in Pike County, Kentucky, United States. Their Post Office has been closed. The community was flooded during the creation of Fishtrap Lake.
