= Printer, Kentucky =

Unincorporated community in Kentucky, United States

- Unincorporated community
- Location within the state of Kentucky Printer (the United States)
- Coordinates: 37°31′47″N 82°44′47″W
- Country: United States
- State: Kentucky
- County: Floyd
- Elevation: 673 ft (205 m)
- Time zone: UTC-5 (Eastern (EST))
  - Summer (DST): UTC-4 (EDT)
- ZIP codes: 41655
- GNIS feature ID: 508877

Printer is an unincorporated community and coal town in Floyd County, Kentucky, United States.

The community is named after John Printer Meade, a pioneer citizen.

The community is located on Kentucky Route 122 at the western terminus of Kentucky Route 2030.

== 1981 Allen shooting ==
On October 16, 1981, a mass shooting occurred, when 70-year-old William Bevins shot eight people at an auto parts store near Allen, Kentucky, killing five and wounding three others. Bevins then returned to his home in Printer, where he was arrested. The shooting was sparked by a dispute with one of the victims.
