= Martin, Kentucky =

- City
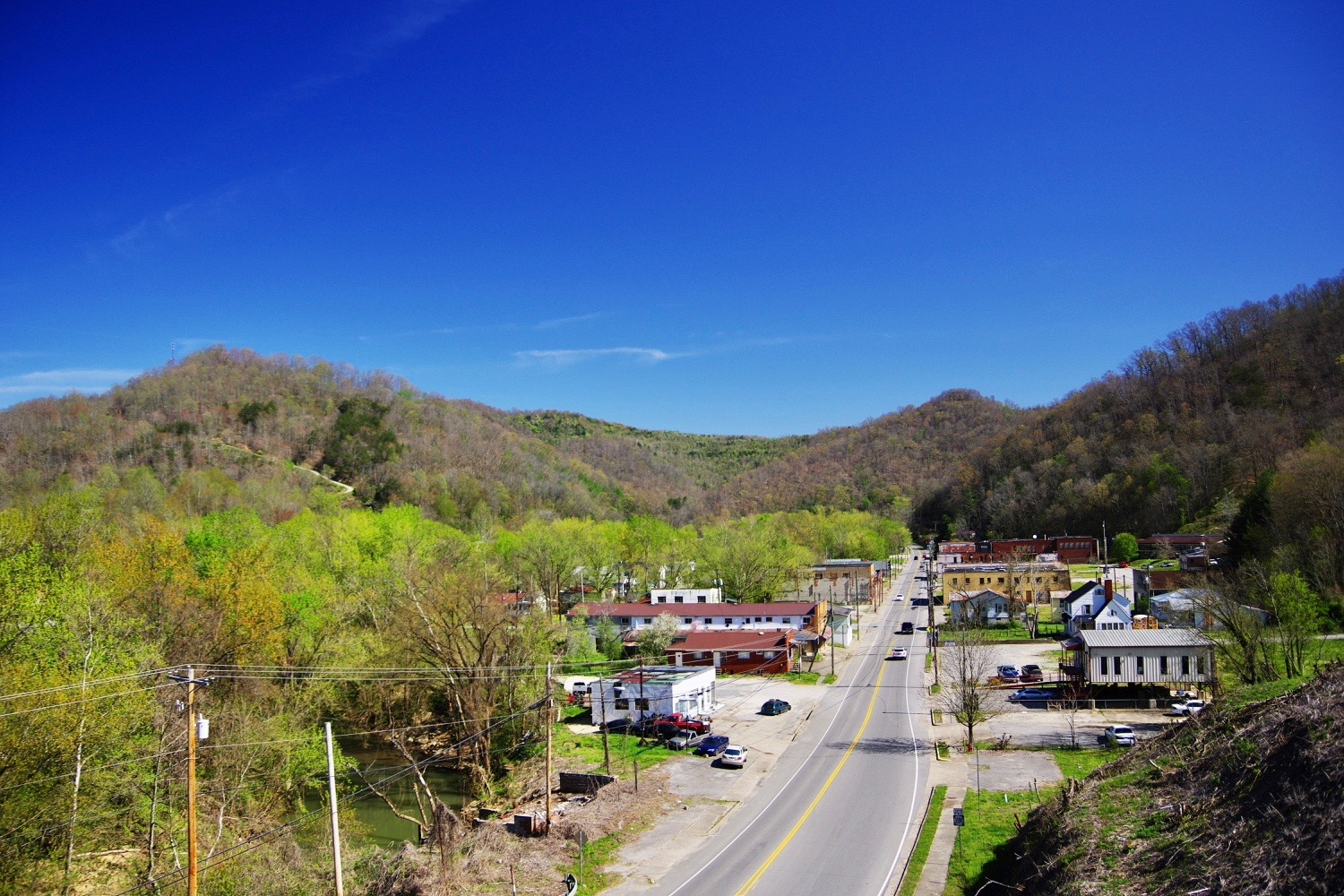
- Main Street in Martin

- Location of Martin in Floyd County, Kentucky.
- Coordinates: 37°34′22″N 82°45′10″W
- Country: United States
- State: Kentucky
- County: Floyd
- Incorporated: 1920

Government
  - Type: Mayor-Council
  - Mayor: Sam Howell

Area
  - Total: 0.75 sq mi (1.95 km^{2})
  - Land: 0.73 sq mi (1.90 km^{2})
  - Water: 0.023 sq mi (0.06 km^{2})
- Elevation: 656 ft (200 m)

Population (2020)
  - Total: 513
  - Density: 700.9/sq mi (270.62/km^{2})
- Time zone: UTC-5 (Eastern (EST))
  - Summer (DST): UTC-4 (EDT)
- ZIP code: 41649
- Area code: 606
- FIPS code: 21-50286
- GNIS feature ID: 497596

Martin is a home rule-class city in Floyd County, Kentucky, in the United States. As of the 2020 census, Martin had a population of 513.

== History ==
Martin developed as a coal mining community in the early 1900s. Its first post office, established in 1910, was named "Bucks Branch" after a tributary of Beaver Creek, the stream that runs through the city. In 1913, the community was renamed "Smalley" after a local landowner, Smalley Crisp. By 1915, however, the community had been renamed "Martin" after the postmaster, Martin Van Allen. The post office began officially using this name in 1926.

== Geography ==
Martin is located near the center of Floyd County. Kentucky Routes 80 and 122 run along the western side of the city. KY 80 leads southwest 41 miles (66 km) to Hazard and north 5 miles (8 km) to U.S. Route 23 at a point 3 miles (5 km) south of Prestonsburg, the county seat. KY 122 leads northwest by a narrower road 11 miles (18 km) to Prestonsburg and south 4 miles (6 km) to Printer. Kentucky Route 1428 (signed as Main Street within the city) connects Martin with Allen to the northeast.

According to the United States Census Bureau, the city of Martin has a total area of 0.75 square miles (1.95 km^{2}), of which 0.02 square miles (0.05 km^{2}), or 2.67%, is water. Beaver Creek, a tributary of the Levisa Fork, flows northward through the center of Martin.

== Demographics ==
Historical population
Census	Pop.	Note	%±
1930	799		—
1940	957		19.8%
1950	1,170		22.3%
1960	992		−15.2%
1970	786		−20.8%
1980	827		5.2%
1990	694		−16.1%
2000	633		−8.8%
2010	634		0.2%
2020	513		−19.1%
U.S. Decennial Census

As of the census of 2000, there were 633 people, 295 households, and 166 families residing in the city. The population density was 1,357.5 inhabitants per square mile (524.1/km^{2}). There were 339 housing units at an average density of 727.0 per square mile (280.7/km^{2}). The racial makeup of the city was 97.31% White, 0.32% Native American, 1.11% Asian, 1.11% Pacific Islander, and 0.16% from two or more races. Hispanic or Latino of any race were 0.95% of the population.

There were 295 households, out of which 28.8% had children under the age of 18 living with them, 31.2% were married couples living together, 21.7% had a female householder with no husband present, and 43.4% were non-families. 40.3% of all households were made up of individuals, and 17.6% had someone living alone who was 65 years of age or older. The average household size was 2.08 and the average family size was 2.81.

In the city, the population was spread out, with 24.6% under the age of 18, 8.2% from 18 to 24, 24.6% from 25 to 44, 25.8% from 45 to 64, and 16.7% who were 65 years of age or older. The median age was 38 years. For every 100 females, there were 77.8 males. For every 100 females age 18 and over, there were 72.2 males.

The median income for a household in the city was $12,917, and the median income for a family was $18,571. Males had a median income of $35,469 versus $19,167 for females. The per capita income for the city was $10,773. About 46.1% of families and 44.0% of the population were below the poverty line, including 64.8% of those under age 18 and 19.5% of those age 65 or over.

== Government ==
Martin uses a mayor–council form of government.

== Education ==
Martin's public schools are operated by Floyd County Schools. The following schools are in Martin:

- May Valley Elementary School
- Renaissance Learning Center
