= WXKZ-FM =

- Prestonsburg, Kentucky; United States
- Frequency: 105.3 MHz
- Branding: Oldies 105.3

Programming
- Format: Oldies
- Affiliations: Fox News Radio

Ownership
- Owner: Gearheart Communications; (Adam D. Gearheart)
- Sister stations: WIFX-FM; WXLR

History
- First air date: 1967
- Former call signs: WPRT-FM (1967–1984); WBVS (1984–1987)

Technical information
- Licensing authority: FCC
- Facility ID: 18549
- Class: A
- ERP: 4,700 watts
- HAAT: 113 meters (371 ft)
- Transmitter coordinates: 37°39′24″N 82°45′58″W

Links
- Public license information: Public file; LMS
- Website: gearheartradio.com

WXKZ-FM (105.3 MHz, "Oldies 105.3 The Kat") is a radio station licensed to serve Prestonsburg, Kentucky. The station is owned by Gearheart Communications and licensed to Adam D. Gearheart. It airs an oldies music format.

In addition to its music programming, WXKZ-FM carries a selection of local sporting events.

The station has been assigned these call letters by the Federal Communications Commission since February 2, 1987.
