= Mary Baird (nurse) =

Northern Irish nurse and health service administrator

- Born: Mary Frances Josephine Baird; 22 May 1907; Belfast, Ireland
- Died: 25 June 2009 (aged 102); Belfast, Northern Ireland
- Occupations: Nurse; health service administrator

Mary Baird, MBE (22 May 1907 - 25 June 2009) was a Northern Irish nurse and health service administrator, working as Northern Ireland's first health visitor.

== Early life ==
Mary Frances Josephine Baird was born in Belfast on 22 May 1907. She was the sixth of the nine children of Robert Baird, an RIC constable, and his wife, Frances Harriet (née Hogan). She had four brothers and four sisters. Her father won an award for bravery in 1911 while serving as acting sergeant in Derry, going on to become a station commandant with the Garda Síochána in County Cavan in 1924. The family moved with him as he moved postings, settling in Belfast by the mid-1920s, which ended his service in the Garda Síochána. Members of her family called her "Maisie", and later "Mousie". When she left school, she became an apprentice to a Belfast milliner, but she became her mother's carer when she was disabled by arthritis, and it was then she decided to train as a nurse.

== Career ==
From 1927-1929 Baird trained as a nurse in Royal Victoria Hospital, Belfast (BVH), registering with the General Nursing Council in 1929. She went on to train as a midwife in Dublin's Rotunda Hospital in 1930, registering as a midwife in 1931. Her first paid position was as a private nurse in Sir William Whitla's Belfast home, as he had been disabled by a stroke in 1929. Baird took up a position in Belfast's public health department in 1931, being one of the first health visitors appointed after the passing of the Local Government Act 1929 in Northern Ireland. She provided child and maternity care in the community, organising clubs for young mothers and their children supported by the Belfast Corporation where attendees needed food. From 1938 she was the non-medical supervisor of midwives.

Baird had joined the Territorial Army Nursing Service as a student nurse, and was called up to join Queen Alexandra's Imperial Military Nursing Service in 1941. For a long time, she was a sister in Bangor hospital and attended to local military personnel, but in the preparations for the D-Day landings she was posted to southern England in early 1944. Baird was one of the first nurses to land in France at the Mulberry temporary harbour at Arromanches, staying with the army as it advanced towards Germany, nursing casualties in field hospitals. In later life, Baird never spoke about her wartime experiences, but Field Marshal Bernard Montgomery cited her "outstanding devotion to duty in north-west Europe", and she was awarded the France and Germany Star.

In 1946, Baird returned to Belfast to work in the Belfast Corporation's public health department as the head of all community nursing services, including domiciliary midwives, health visitors, and Queen's district nurses. In 1948 Baird became Superintendent Nursing Officer, Belfast County Borough Health Committee, a post she held until her retirement. She was involved in the massive changes that took place during the establishment of the National Health Service (NHS) in 1948. Having been employed by Belfast Corporation and not the new NHS, Baird was eligible to be appointed to the Northern Ireland Hospitals Authority board where she represented the Royal College of Nursing until 1964.

She served as Chair of the Northern Ireland branch of the Royal College of Nursing (RCN) from 1959 to 1961, and again in 1963. Her role included sitting on the RCN Finance Committee and Establishment and General Purposes Committee 1961-1962. Baird was also the RCN representative on the NI Local Government Superannuation Committee. On Ministry of Labour tribunals, Baird served inter alia. She was also active with the British Legion. In North Belfast, she was involved in the foundation and administration of a home for retired nurses. She retired from her post in March 1969, but remained active in voluntary groups and in public life.

In 1964, she was awarded an MBE.

== Later life ==
Baird was a lifelong member of the RVH League of Nurses. In 2000 her portrait was featured as part of series of photographs representing the stages of human life by artist Avril Wilson. She died on 25 June 2009 in a nursing home in Belfast, aged 102.
