= Royville, Kentucky =

Unincorporated community in Kentucky, United States

Royville
- Unincorporated community
- Location within the state of Kentucky Royville (the United States)
- Coordinates: 37°4′00″N 85°6′21″W
- Country: United States
- State: Kentucky
- County: Russell
- Elevation: 1,079 ft (329 m)
- Time zone: UTC-6 (Central (CST))
  - Summer (DST): UTC-5 (EDT)
- GNIS feature ID: 502444

Royville is an unincorporated community located in Russell County, Kentucky, United States.

The community derives its name from John Roy, a town merchant.
