= WKVG (AM) =

Radio station in Jenkins, Kentucky

- Jenkins, Kentucky; United States
- Broadcast area: Eastern Kentucky; Southwest Virginia
- Frequency: 1000 kHz

Ownership
- Owner: Martins & Associates Inc.

History
- First air date: 1970
- Last air date: March 3, 2023
- Former call signs: WREM (1970–1981); WIFX (1981–1990)
- Call sign meaning: "Kentucky Virginia Gospel"

Technical information
- Facility ID: 40502
- Class: D
- Power: 1,000 watts (days only)
- Transmitter coordinates: 37°09′59.0″N 82°37′13.0″W
- Translator: 103.5 W278BK (Jenkins)

WKVG was a southern gospel formatted broadcast radio station licensed to Jenkins, Kentucky, serving Eastern Kentucky and Southwest Virginia. WKVG had been owned and operated by Martins & Associates Inc.

== History ==
The station was first licensed, as WREM, in 1970. It was assigned the WKVG call letters by the Federal Communications Commission (FCC) on April 4, 1990. The license for WKVG was surrendered by Martin & Associates on March 3, 2023, and cancelled by the FCC on April 5, 2023.
