= McDowell, Kentucky =

Unincorporated community in Kentucky, United States

- Census-designated place
- Location in Kentucky
- Coordinates: 37°27′32″N 82°44′03″W
- Country: United States
- State: Kentucky
- County: Floyd

Area
  - Total: 2.48 sq mi (6.42 km^{2})
  - Land: 2.47 sq mi (6.41 km^{2})
  - Water: 0 sq mi (0.00 km^{2})
- Elevation: 824 ft (251 m)

Population (2020)
  - Total: 661
  - Density: 266.9/sq mi (103.05/km^{2})
- Time zone: UTC-5 (Eastern (EST))
  - Summer (DST): UTC-4 (EDT)
- ZIP code: 41647
- FIPS code: 21-48954
- GNIS feature ID: 2629652

McDowell is an unincorporated community and census-designated place (CDP) in Floyd County, Kentucky, United States. As of the 2020 census, McDowell had a population of 661.

== Demographics ==
Historical population
Census	Pop.	Note	%±
2020	661		—
U.S. Decennial Census

== See also ==
- List of census-designated places in Kentucky
