= Mousie, Kentucky =

Unincorporated community in Kentucky, United States

- Unincorporated community
- Location within Kentucky Location within the United States
- Coordinates: 37°25′6″N 82°52′42″W
- Country: United States
- State: Kentucky
- County: Knott
- Elevation: 797 ft (243 m)
- Time zone: UTC-5 (Eastern (EST))
  - Summer (DST): UTC-4 (EDT)
- ZIP codes: 41839
- GNIS feature ID: 498964

Mousie is an unincorporated community within Knott County, Kentucky, United States.

== History ==
A post office called Mousie has been in operation since 1916. Mousie was the name of the first postmaster's daughter. According to one account, the girl's name was Mousie Martin.

== Notable people ==
- Bob Conley, baseball player
