= Virgie, Kentucky =

Census-designated place in Kentucky, United States

- Census-designated place (CDP)
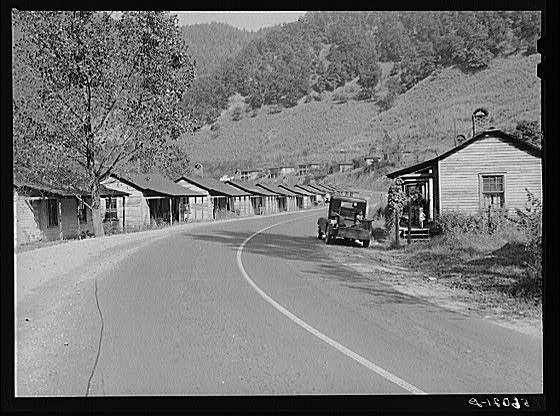
- Company homes in Virgie in 1940

- Location in Pike County and the state of Kentucky.
- Coordinates: 37°20′06″N 82°34′47″W
- Country: United States
- State: Kentucky
- County: Pike

Area
  - Total: 1.02 sq mi (2.65 km^{2})
  - Land: 1.02 sq mi (2.65 km^{2})
  - Water: 0 sq mi (0.00 km^{2})
- Elevation: 902 ft (275 m)

Population (2020)
  - Total: 274
  - Density: 267.6/sq mi (103.33/km^{2})
- Time zone: UTC-5 (Eastern (EST))
  - Summer (DST): UTC-4 (EDT)
- ZIP codes: 41572
- Area code: 606
- GNIS feature ID: 506067

Virgie is a Census-designated place (CDP) located along Kentucky Route 1469 in Pike County, Kentucky, United States. Virgie's post office was established as Clintwood on April 3, 1890, with James M. Damron as postmaster. It was later renamed "Virgie" after the daughter of local resident, W.O.B. Ratliff, who was a lawyer and lumber dealer in Pikeville.

The 2020 United States census reported Virgie's population was 274.

In recent years, Virgie has gained some popularity from the musician Tyler Childers' song, "Follow you to Virgie", as the setting of the song's story.

== Geography ==
Virgie is located at an elevation of 902 feet (275 m).

== Demographics ==
Historical population
Census	Pop.	Note	%±
2020	274		—
U.S. Decennial Census

== Education ==
Public education in Virgie is administered by Pike County Schools, which operates Valley Elementary School and Shelby Valley High School. Formerly George F. Johnson Elementary School and Virgie Middle School (formerly Virgie High School) were the education systems in the town of Virgie, until the new integrated primary school system known as Valley Elementary.

Virgie has a lending library, a branch of the Pike County Public Library.

== Notable residents ==
- Todd May – 1982 Kentucky "Mr. Basketball"
- Cassidy Rowe – 2022 - former Kentucky Wildcats women's basketball
- Josh Osborne - Grammy winning and multi hit Country Music Songwriter
