= Fishtrap Lake =

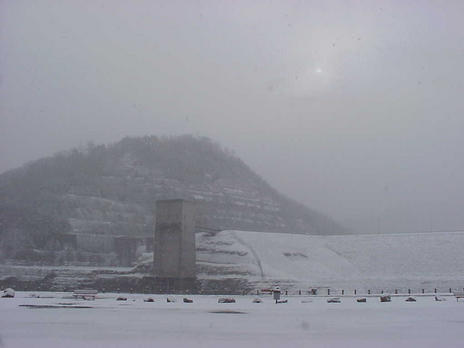
- Fishtrap Lake and dam during a winter storm

- Location within Kentucky
- Location: Pike County, Kentucky
- Coordinates: 37°25′55″N 82°24′55″W
- Type: reservoir
- Primary inflows: Levisa Fork of the Big Sandy River
- Primary outflows: Levisa Fork of the Big Sandy River
- Basin countries: United States
- Surface area: 1,130-acre (5 km^{2})
- Max. depth: 84 feet (26 m)
- Surface elevation: 757 feet (231 m)

Fishtrap Lake is a 1,130-acre (5 km^{2}) reservoir in Pike County, Kentucky. Dedicated by President Lyndon B. Johnson in 1968, the lake was formed by the impounding of the Levisa Fork of the Big Sandy River at the 195-foot-high Fishtrap Dam (37°25′55″N 82°24′55″W) by the United States Army Corps of Engineers.

It is the primary attraction of Fishtrap Lake State Park.
