= Grady Wallace =

American basketball player (1934–2006)

Personal information
- Born: January 20, 1934 Floyd County, Kentucky, U.S.
- Died: August 17, 2006 (aged 72) Columbia, South Carolina, U.S.
- Listed height: 6 ft 4 in (1.93 m)
- Listed weight: 165 lb (75 kg)

Career information
- High school: Betsy Layne (Betsy Layne, Kentucky)
- College: Pikeville (1953–1955); South Carolina (1955–1957)
- NBA draft: 1957: 5th round, 40th overall pick
- Drafted by: Boston Celtics
- Position: Forward
- Number: 14, 42

Career highlights
- Consensus second-team All-American (1957); NCAA scoring champion (1957); First-team All-ACC (1957); Second-team All-ACC (1956); No. 42 retired by South Carolina Gamecocks
- Stats at Basketball Reference

Grady A. Wallace (January 20, 1934 – August 17, 2006) was an All-American basketball player for the South Carolina Gamecocks in 1955–56 and 1956–57. As a senior in 1957, Wallace led the National Collegiate Athletic Association (NCAA) in scoring with 31.3 points per game (ppg), which edged out future Naismith Basketball Hall of Famers Elgin Baylor (29.7) and Wilt Chamberlain (29.6).

Wallace was born in Mare Creek (now called Stanville), Kentucky, the son of Rufus and Sudie (Smith) Wallace. He was raised in Betsy Layne in Floyd County and attended Betsy Layne High School from 1949 to 1953.

He spent two years at Pikeville Junior College in his home state of Kentucky before enrolling at the University of South Carolina.

In Wallace's junior season of college, his first with the Gamecocks, he averaged 23.9 ppg. He scored a school record 54 points against Georgia on December 21, 1956 (John Roche would later score 56 in 1971) and owns four of the top six single-game scoring outputs in USC history. His career average of 28.0 ppg is the highest in school history, and his career rebound average of over 12 per game is the second highest.

Wallace was selected by the Boston Celtics in the 1957 NBA draft in the fifth round (40th pick overall) but never played professionally. After college, he played two seasons with the industrial league Phillips 66ers. He later coached at Cardinal Newman High School in South Carolina for nine seasons, leading the team to two state titles.

He would later become the first men's basketball player in USC history to have his jersey number retired. Wallace died of heart failure in Columbia, South Carolina, on August 17, 2006, at the age of 72. Survivors included his wife, Janet, children Leigh Ann and Thomas, and three grandchildren.

== See also ==
- List of NCAA Division I men's basketball season scoring leaders
