= Wheelwright, Kentucky =

- City
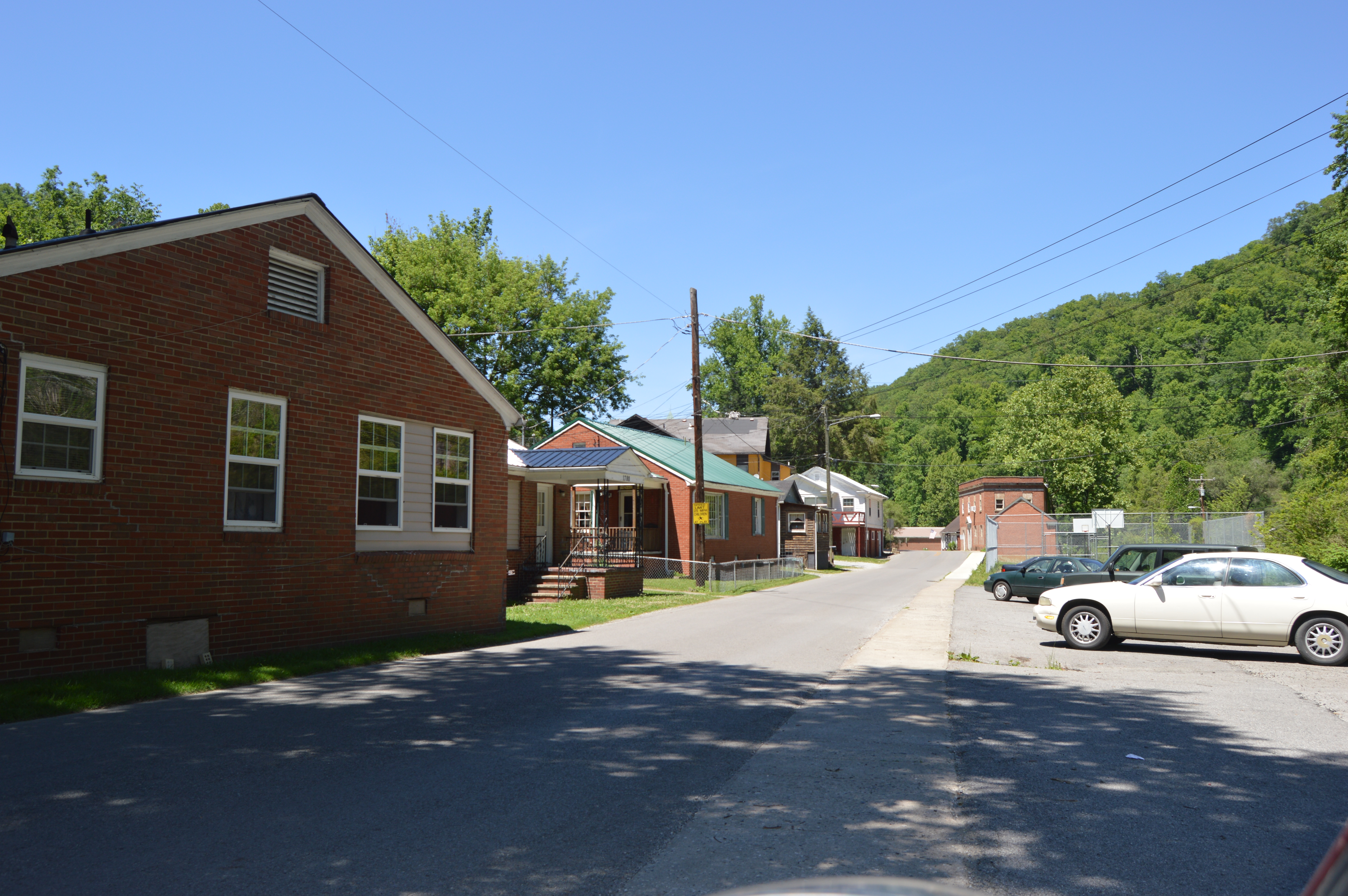
- Housing on South Main Street

- Location of Wheelwright in Floyd County, Kentucky.
- Coordinates: 37°19′57″N 82°43′15″W
- Country: United States
- State: Kentucky
- County: Floyd
- Incorporated: February 6, 1917

Government
  - Type: City Commission
  - Mayor: Don "Booty" Hall

Area
  - Total: 1.76 sq mi (4.57 km^{2})
  - Land: 1.76 sq mi (4.57 km^{2})
  - Water: 0 sq mi (0.00 km^{2})
- Elevation: 1,237 ft (377 m)

Population (2020)
  - Total: 509
  - Density: 288.7/sq mi (111.45/km^{2})
- Time zone: UTC-5 (Eastern (EST))
  - Summer (DST): UTC-4 (EDT)
- ZIP code: 41669
- Area code: 606
- FIPS code: 21-82272
- GNIS feature ID: 2405727

Wheelwright is a home rule-class city in Floyd County, Kentucky, United States. The population was 509 at the 2020 census, down from 780 in 2010 and 1,042 in 2000.

== History ==
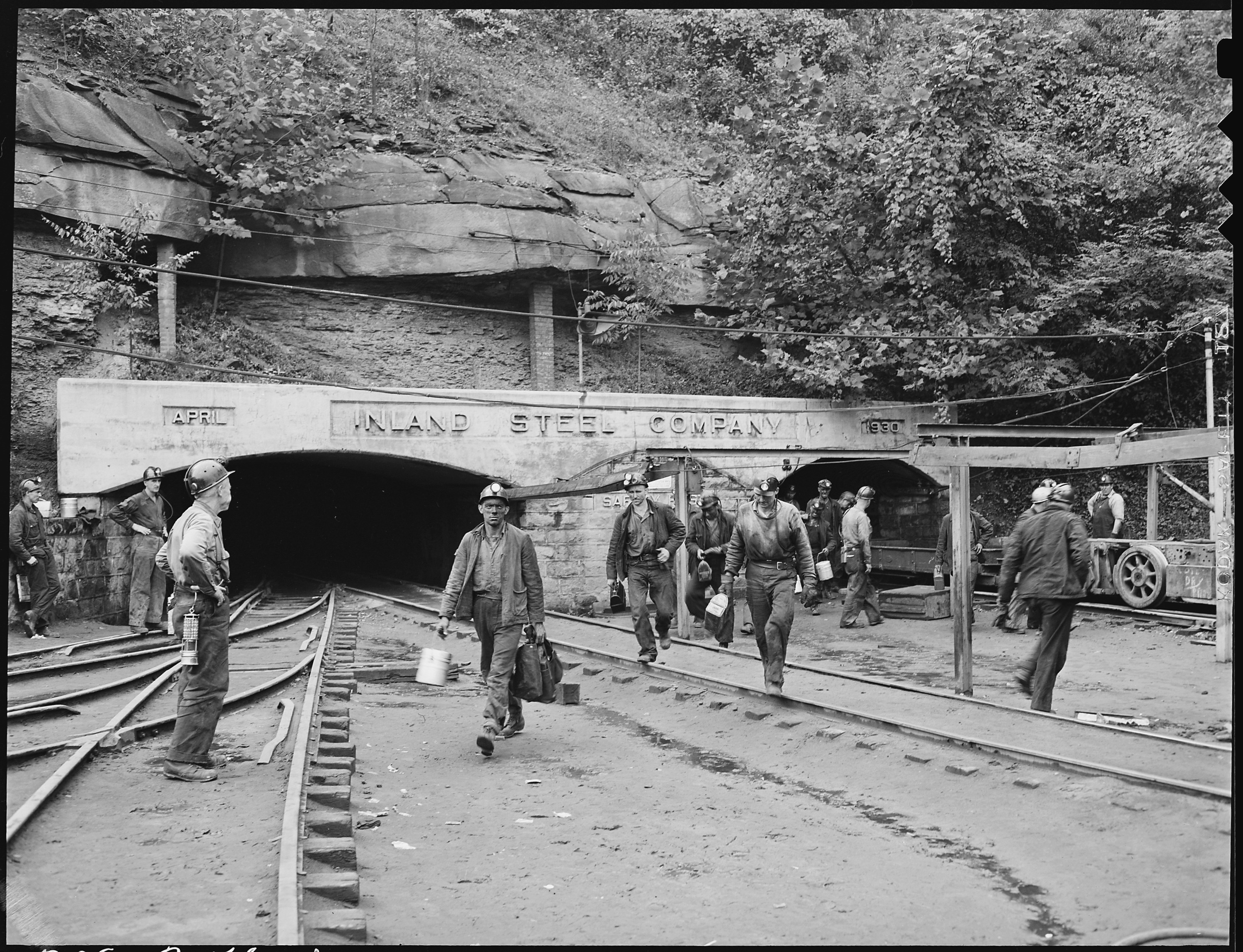
The town produced coal for the Inland Steel Company

Before the arrival of coal mining jobs, many locals lived by farming or logging. The land which would later become Wheelwright was owned by the Hall family. In 1916, the Halls sold their land to the Elk Horn Coal Company. That same year a post office was established with the name Wheelwright, named for the company's president at that time, Jere H. Wheelwright. The city was officially incorporated in 1917. Elk Horn leased its mines from the Consolidation Coal. In 1930, Consolidation sold the Wheelwright coal camp to Inland Steel. In 1966, Inland Steel sold the camp to Island Creek Coal. The mine closed in the 1970s. After the mine was abandoned, the Kentucky Housing Corporation purchased the town, rehabilitated the homes, and sold the homes to residents.

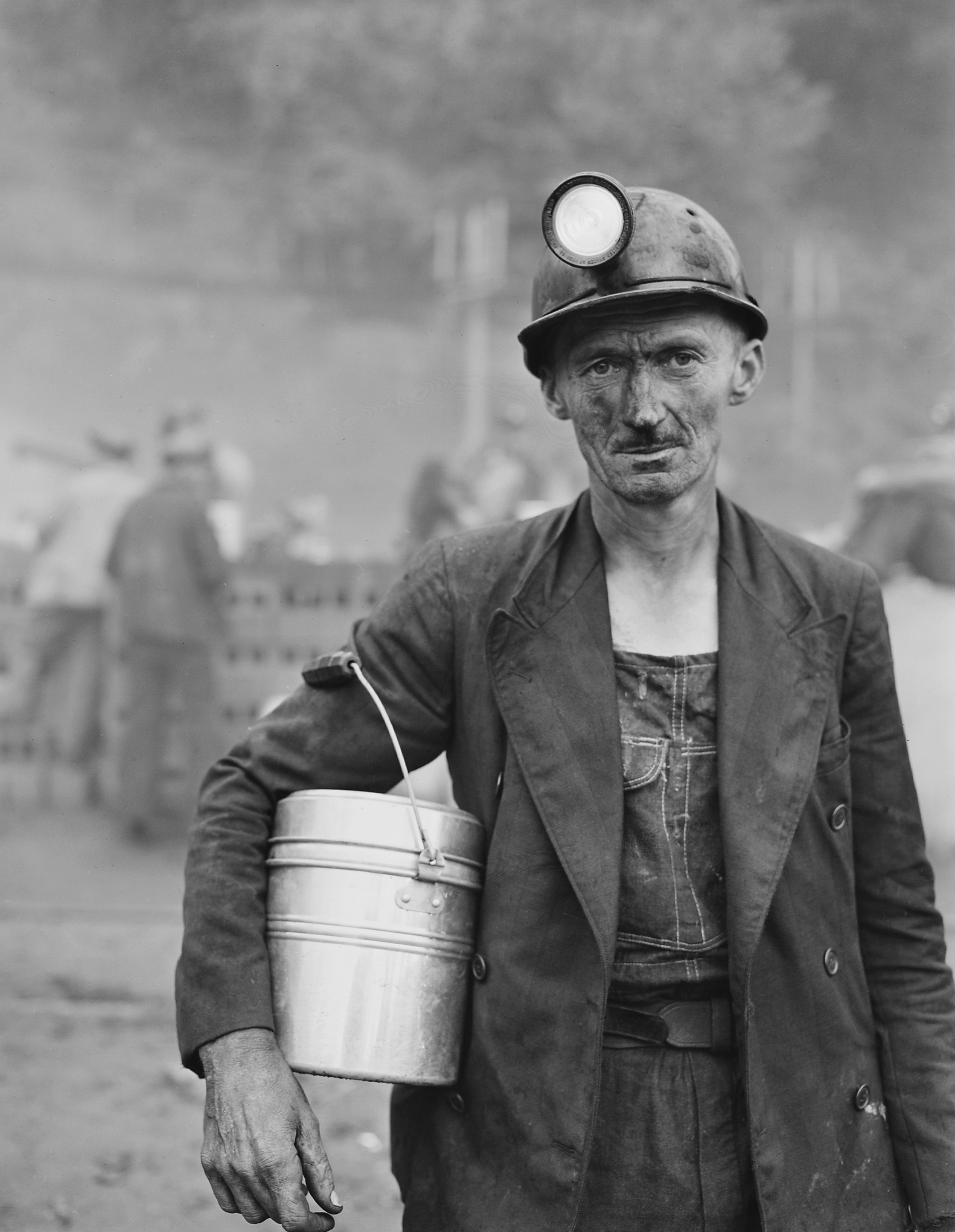
Coal loader Harry Fain in Wheelwright, 1946

Wheelwright is a coal town. When the city was founded, the coal company built housing, stores, churches, schools, and medical facilities to provide for the miners' families. Miners employed the coal company would have used these services to provide food and other necessities to their families. At one time, the coal company had at least 2,300 miners on its payroll.

Wheelwright was home to one of the pack horse libraries in the 1930s and early 1940s.

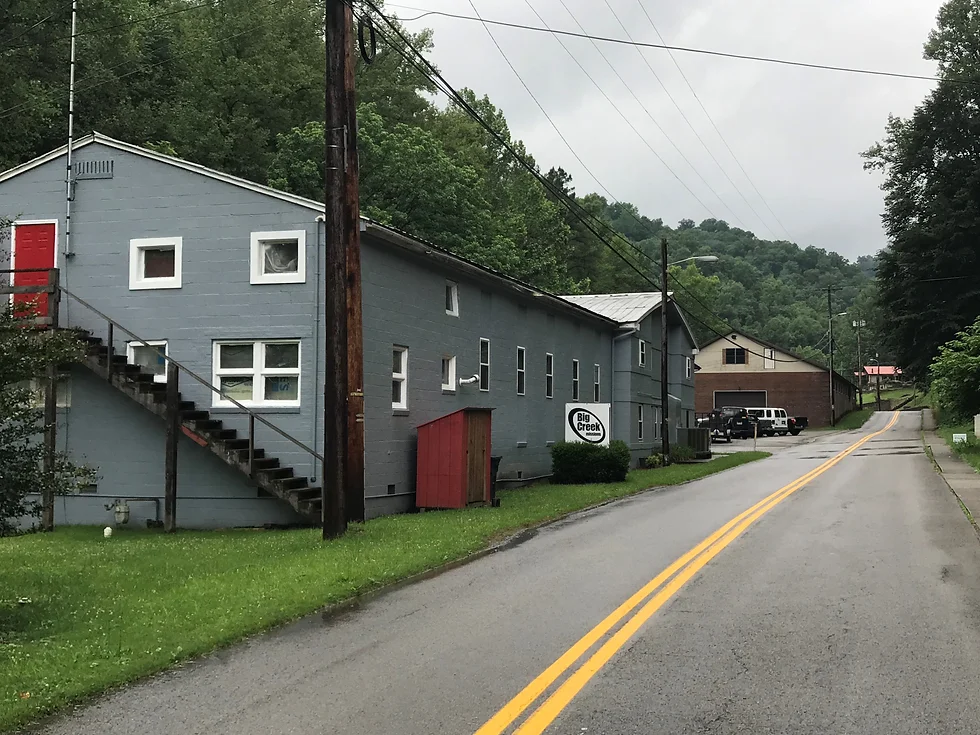
The Main Building of Big Creek Wheelwright

In 2018, Big Creek Missions purchased a building that was a former church, and repurposed it to act as a Christian Mission Retreat Center. Since 2018, Big Creek has helped the population of Floyd County with architecture, landscaping, and food banks.

== Geography ==
Wheelwright is located at the southern end of Floyd County in the valley of the Right Fork Otter Creek. There is just one way in and out of the city, via the Junction Bridge, located in Bypro, also referred to as "Wheelwright Junction", on state route 122. The original metal structure was replaced by concrete in 1959. This bridge is now known as the Timothy Hall Memorial Bridge, in honor of City Commissioner Timothy Hall, who died in a car crash.

According to the United States Census Bureau, the city has a total area of 1.8 square miles (4.6 km^{2}), all land.

== Demographics ==
Historical population
Census	Pop.	Note	%±
1920	506		—
1930	1,822		260.1%
1940	2,027		11.3%
1950	2,037		0.5%
1960	1,518		−25.5%
1970	793		−47.8%
1980	865		9.1%
1990	721		−16.6%
2000	1,042		44.5%
2010	780		−25.1%
2020	509		−34.7%
U.S. Decennial Census

As of the census of 2000, there were 1,042 people, 203 households, and 146 families residing in the city. The population density was 598.0 inhabitants per square mile (230.9/km^{2}). There were 236 housing units at an average density of 135.4 per square mile (52.3/km^{2}). The racial makeup of the city was 63.15% White, 34.74% African American, 0.10% Asian, 1.25% from other races, and 0.77% from two or more races. Hispanic or Latino of any race were 1.73% of the population.

There were 203 households, out of which 36.0% had children under the age of 18 living with them, 53.7% were married couples living together, 16.3% had a female householder with no husband present, and 27.6% were non-families. 26.1% of all households were made up of individuals, and 10.3% had someone living alone who was 65 years of age or older. The average household size was 2.53 and the average family size was 3.08.

In the city, the population was spread out, with 13.7% under the age of 18, 22.7% from 18 to 24, 43.4% from 25 to 44, 13.6% from 45 to 64, and 6.5% who were 65 years of age or older. The median age was 29 years. For every 100 females, there were 290.3 males. For every 100 females age 18 and over, there were 330.1 males.

The median income for a household in the city was $14,808, and the median income for a family was $20,625. Males had a median income of $30,625 versus $16,563 for females. The per capita income for the city was $5,367. About 36.8% of families and 40.0% of the population were below the poverty line, including 47.0% of those under the age of 18 and 11.6% of those ages 65 and older. As of the census in 2014, there were 556 people left in the city of Wheelwright.

== Government ==
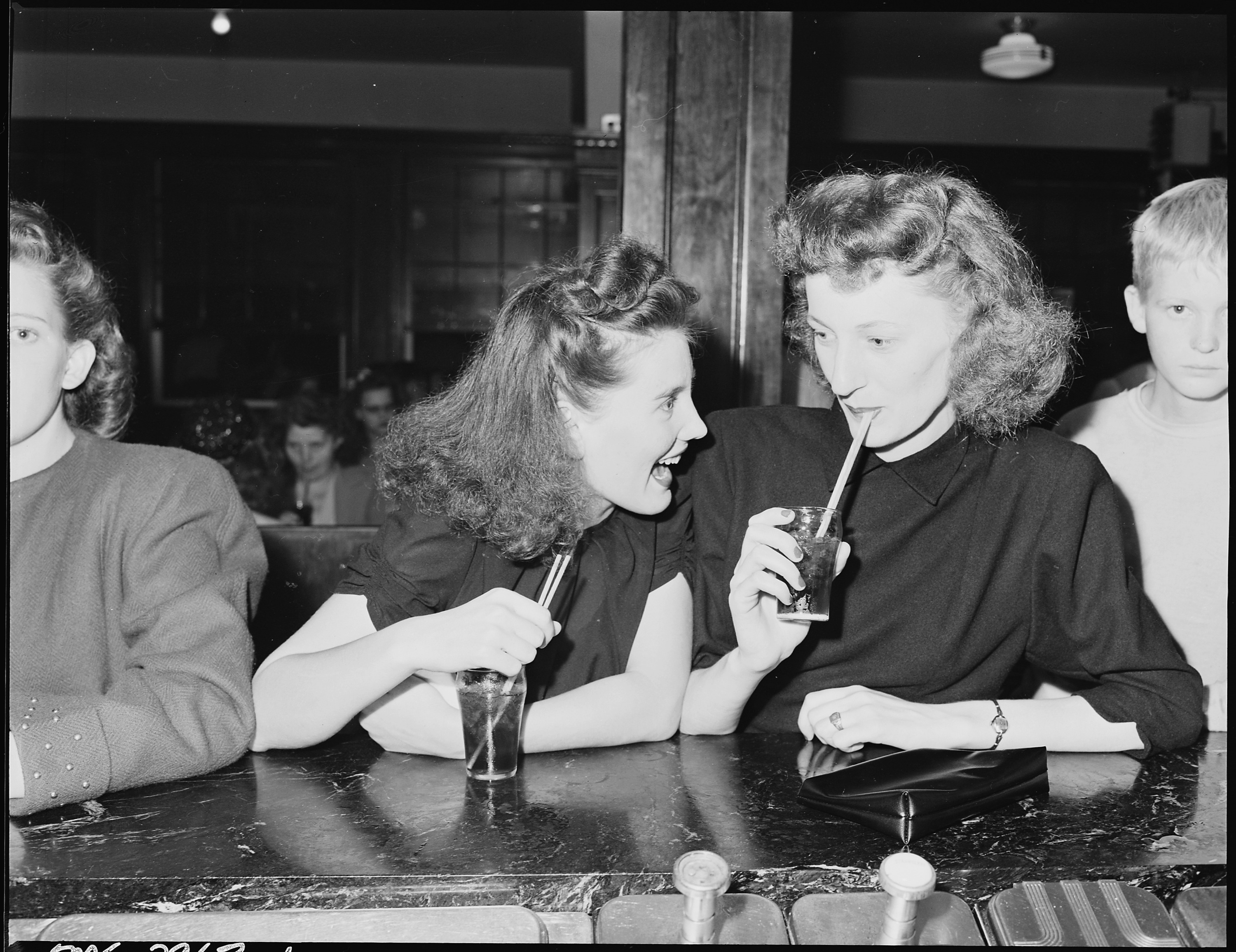
Future Wheelright Mayor Ella Jane Fain, age 18 (right) and her cousin at the soda fountain in 1946

Wheelwright is governed by a city commission form of government. Its current mayor is Don "Booty" Hall. The city commission consists of Michael Bub Tackett Jr., Dana McCown and Bill Newsome.

== Education ==
Floyd County's public schools are operated by Floyd County Schools. Most students residing in the city of Wheelwright attend:

- South Floyd Elementary School
- Floyd Central High School

== Prison ==
The Corrections Corporation of America (now CoreCivic)-owned Otter Creek Correctional Center in Wheelwright closed in 2012, due in part to a riot by Indiana prisoners in 2001, and subsequent widespread sexual abuse of women inmates. The prison, renamed the Southeast State Correctional Complex and operated by the Kentucky Department of Corrections under a lease from CoreCivic, reopened as a male facility in September 2020.
