= Midas, Kentucky =

Unincorporated community in Kentucky, United States

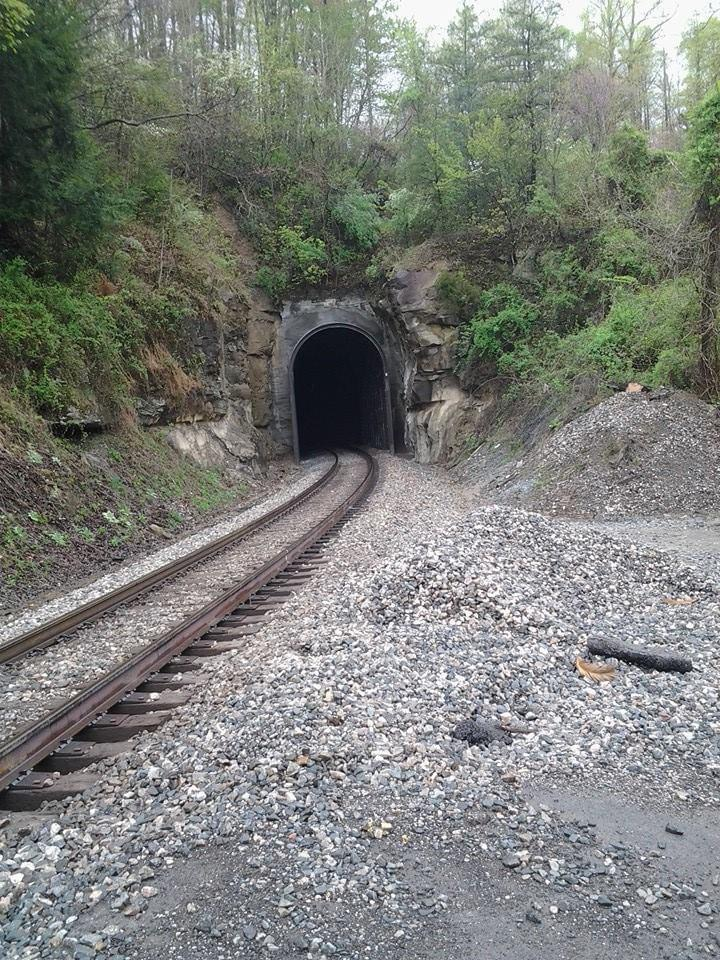
- Tunnel at Midas, KY

- Location within the state of Kentucky Midas (the United States)
- Coordinates: 37°30′44″N 82°50′06″W
- Country: United States
- State: Kentucky
- County: Floyd
- Elevation: 709 ft (216 m)
- Time zone: UTC-05:00 (Eastern (EST))
  - Summer (DST): UTC-04:00 (EDT)
- ZIP code: 41640
- GNIS feature ID: 508596

Midas is an unincorporated community located in Floyd County, Kentucky. It is located around the intersection of Midas Road and Kentucky Route 550, north of Hueysville (separated by Midas Tunnel) and west of Eastern. Not much remains except some scattered residences, Midas Road, and the Midas Tunnel. CSX E&BV Subdivision passes through Midas and crosses Midas Road after exiting the tunnel.

== Civil War history ==
On January 10, 1862, the Battle of Middle Creek was fought near Prestonburg. Brig. Gen. Humphrey Marshall and his Confederate troops retreated using the Left Fork of Middle Creek. They went south and camped near Midas at the Joseph Gearheart Farm, located midway between Midas and Hueysville. After staying for a week, Humphrey and his troops traveled farther up Beaver Creek before retreating out of Kentucky and into Virginia.

== Later history ==
A 1918 survey noted that the Midas Oil & Gas Company was one of "eighteen or twenty oil and gas operating concerns in Floyd County, Kentucky". By 1927, it was reported that a 9 million cubic foot gas facility was being offered for sale in "Midas, Floyd County, Kentucky, on branch of Chesapeake & Ohio Railway Co.", and in 1937, it was reported that the Inland Gas Corporation had "a sixteen-inch line with a capacity of about thirty-five million cubic feet per day extending from Midas on Right Beaver Creek northwardly" through Floyd County and several neighboring counties. In 1970, the Inland Gas Company sought permission and approval from the Federal Power Commission to abandon its Midas Compressor Station in Floyd County.
