= George G. Hatcher =

American educator and politician

66th and 68th Secretary of State of Kentucky
- In office January 5, 1948 – January 7, 1952
- Governor: Earle Clements; Lawrence Wetherby
- Preceded by: Charles D. Arnett
- Succeeded by: Charles K. O'Connor
- In office January 1, 1940 – January 3, 1944
- Governor: Keen Johnson; Simeon Willis
- Preceded by: Charles K. O'Connor
- Succeeded by: Charles K. O'Connor

Deputy Clerk of the Kentucky Court of Appeals
- In office 1936–1939

City Clerk of Ashland, Kentucky
- In office 1932–1936

Personal details
- Born: January 25, 1903 Bonanza, Kentucky, U.S.
- Died: December 26, 1983 (aged 80) Lexington, Kentucky, U.S.
- Resting place: Frankfort Cemetery
- Party: Democratic
- Spouse(s): Vada Ball (m. 1929); Lorraine Jarrell (m. 1948)
- Children: 4
- Parent(s): George Marion Hatcher; Mary Clarinda Fairchild
- Education: Berea College; Eastern Kentucky State Teachers College

George Glenn Hatcher (January 25, 1903 – December 29, 1983) was an American educator and politician who served two non-consecutive terms as Secretary of State of Kentucky from 1940 to 1944 and 1948 to 1952, City Clerk of Ashland, Kentucky from 1932 to 1936, and Deputy Clerk of the Kentucky Court of Appeals from 1936 to 1939. He was a member of the Democratic Party.

== Early life and education ==
George Glenn Hatcher was born on January 25, 1903, in Bonanza, Floyd County, Kentucky, to George Marion Hatcher and Mary Clarinda Fairchild. He attended the common schools of Floyd County, and later attended Berea College for two years from 1919 to 1921. He also attended Eastern Kentucky State Teachers College. He married Vada Bell on February 27, 1929, they had one child, Mary. His second marriage was to Lorraine Jarrell, on October 15, 1948, they had three children, Elissa, Elizabeth, and Glenna Jo.

== Career ==
After graduating, Hatcher was employed as a teacher in Floyd County Schools. From 1925 to 1932, he worked for the American Rolling Mill Company, serving in management roles.

=== Political career ===
While working at steel mills, Hatcher was a political organizer in Boyd County, Kentucky. A Democrat, he was elected city clerk of Ashland, Kentucky, and served in this role for four years from 1932 to 1936. In 1936, he was appointed Deputy Clerk of the Kentucky Court of Appeals, a position he held from 1936 to 1939.

=== Secretary of State of Kentucky (1940–1944) ===
In 1939, Hatcher ran for Secretary of State of Kentucky against Charles Trivett. Hatcher defeated Trivett taking 168,832 votes to Trivett's 94,372 votes. Hatcher assumed office on January 1, 1940. In the course of his term, he put in place many procedures that expedited services to businesses and governments across Kentucky. He also helped modernize the office of Secretary of State. These modernizations included photo-recording devices and addressograph-like methods to establish precise record keeping. After he left office, he found work in business and sales.

==== Second term (1948–1952) ====
In 1947, Hatcher ran for a second, non-consecutive term as secretary of state against E. E. Hughes. Hatcher defeated Hughes and assumed office on January 1, 1948. Hatcher was the first person to serve two complete terms as secretary of state in the 20th century. During his term, he represented Kentucky at the National Secretary of States Association and served as chairman of the Eastern Kentucky Appalachian Commission. In 1950, he ran in the primary for U.S. senator against Earle Clements. He came in second place taking 40,240 votes to Clements 114,835 votes. In 1951, he lost a bid for Kentucky Auditor of Public Accounts, losing to T. Herbert Tinsley. After leaving office, he again found work in business.

=== Later career ===
In 1955, Hatcher ran for Clerk of the Kentucky of Appeals, but lost in the primary. In 1962, he served as assistant to the commissioner of the Kentucky Department of Finance. In 1964, he developed a state local records program to help preserve historical records that were being destroyed or lost. In the following years, he continued to serve in various roles in the state government. He later accepted a job in the Franklin County Judge/Executive office, which he served in until his retirement.

== Personal life ==
After his retirement, Hatcher spent most of his time doing historical research. He was known for his extensive knowledge of eastern Kentucky history, lore, and politics.

== Death ==
Hatcher died on December 29, 1983, at the Albert B. Chandler Hospital in Lexington, Kentucky. He was 80 years old. He was interred at the Frankfort Cemetery in Frankfort, Kentucky.
