= BLHS =

BLHS may refer to:

- Ben Lomond High School, Ogden, Utah, United States
- Betsy Layne High School, Betsy Layne, Kentucky, United States
- Bishop LeBlond High School, St. Joseph, Missouri, United States
- Bishop Luers High School, Fort Wayne, Indiana, United States
- Bushwick Leaders High School for Academic Excellence, New York, New York, United States
- Bishop Lynch High School, Dallas, Texas, United States
