= Allen Central High School =

Location
- 442 KY Rt. 550; Eastern, (Floyd County), Kentucky 41622; United States; 37.517138°N 82.808581°W

Information
- School type: State School, Public Secondary School
- Status: Consolidated
- Closed: 2017
- School district: Floyd County Schools
- NCES District ID: 2101950
- Superintendent: Henry Webb
- CEEB code: 180723
- NCES School ID: 210195000404
- Principal: Larry Begley
- Faculty: 29.50 (on an FTE basis)
- Grades: 9–12
- Gender: 205 Male : 173 Female
- Enrollment: 378 (2015–16)
  - Grade 9: 87
  - Grade 10: 92
  - Grade 11: 92
  - Grade 12: 105
  - Special education: 2
- Student to teacher ratio: 14.00
- Schedule type: Semester
- Schedule: Monday - Friday
- Hours in school day: 7
- Campuses: 1
- Campus: Rural: Distant
- Colors: Columbia blue and grey with dark red
- Athletics conference: KHSAA
- Nickname: Rebels
- Team name: Fighting Rebels
- Yearbook: The Floyd Countian
- Feeder schools: Allen Central Middle School, James A. Duff Elementary, May Valley Elementary
- Website: floyd.achs.schoolfusion.us

Allen Central High School (Allen Central, Central, or ACHS) was a Title I American high school located in Eastern, Floyd County, Kentucky, United States, and was one of four public high schools in the Floyd County School system. The school colors were Columbia blue and gray; however, over time dark red has been added.

Built in the early 70s, with its first students being received in the fall of 1972, the first principal at Allen Central was Dave Hensley. After his death, a bridge that carries Kentucky Route 80 in front of Allen Central Middle School and Hensley's former home was renamed the Dave Hensley Memorial Bridge.

The nickname of Allen Central is Rebels. American football games are played on Rebel Field. Basketball, volleyball and archery are played in the J. H. Campbell Gymnasium. The school plays host to many county and district tournaments due to its centralized location.

In 2014, plans were made to consolidate Allen Central and South Floyd High School into a new Floyd Central High School, located near the Allen Central campus. The new school opened in the fall of 2017. At that time, Allen Central was converted into a technical education hub for the Floyd County school district, while South Floyd High was converted to an elementary school.

== Mascot and flag scandals ==
Since the school's opening, the school has displayed symbols of the Confederate States of America. A Confederate flag was displayed in the school gymnasium as recently as January 2007, and the school mascot is a Confederate soldier who, as of late 2006, appeared on a sign at the entrance to the school. A nearby courtyard has blue brick forming the Cross of St. Andrew, and a mural in the lobby shows a rebel soldier carrying the flag on horseback. Other images of rebel soldiers and Confederate flags cover the same walls. The images have stoked controversy, since many consider them to be racist symbols, whether in Floyd County, in Kentucky, and elsewhere, although there is also support in the county for retaining the symbols.

Allen Central adopted the school flag and mascot in 1972, when four other schools were consolidated to form the high school. Students formed a committee and chose the mascot. The four previous schools and their mascots were the Maytown Wildcats, the Garrett Black Devils, the Wayland Wasps and the Martin Purple Flash.

== Academic courses ==
Allen Central High School provides 33 main courses along with participation in the Floyd County Early College Academy. They include:

- Mathematics: Algebra I, Algebra II, Geometry, Precalculus, Calculus
- Social studies: Introduction to Social Studies, World Civilizations, History, Geography, Psychology, United States History, Sociology
- The Sciences: Integrated Science I, Integrated Science II, Biology, Human Anatomy, Biomedical Science
- English Language Arts: English I, English II, English III, English IV, English Communications
- Enrichment: Junior Reserve Officers' Training Corps, Practical Living Studies, Music, Guitar, Physical Education, Health, Art, Drama
- Foreign languages: Spanish I, Spanish II
- On-campus college credit classes: College Algebra, College Precalculus, English 100, English 200, Music 100

== Sports ==
Boys' Basketball, Girls' Basketball, Volleyball, Archery, American football, Baseball, Softball

== Extracurricular activities ==
Academic Team, NHD History Club, Kentucky Youth Assembly, Math Club, Drama Club, Student Tech. Leadership Program, Yearbook Team

== Notes ==
- "Allen Central High School". Archived from the original on 29 June 2006.
- "Our Rebel Years Allen Central High School".
- Eastern Kentucky students hold onto Confederate school symbols
- "Kentucky Department of Education". Archived from the original on August 9, 2006.
