= Orcadian =

Orcadian may refer to:

- Something of, from, or related to Orkney
  - Orcadians
  - Orcadian dialect of Scots

== See also ==
- Orcadia (disambiguation)
- Orkney (disambiguation)
