= Allen shooting =

Allen shooting may refer to:

- 1981 Allen shooting
- 2022 shooting of Kentucky police officers, which occurred in Allen, Kentucky
- 2023 Allen, Texas, mall shooting
