= Betsy Layne, Kentucky =

Census-designated place in Kentucky, United States

- Census-designated place
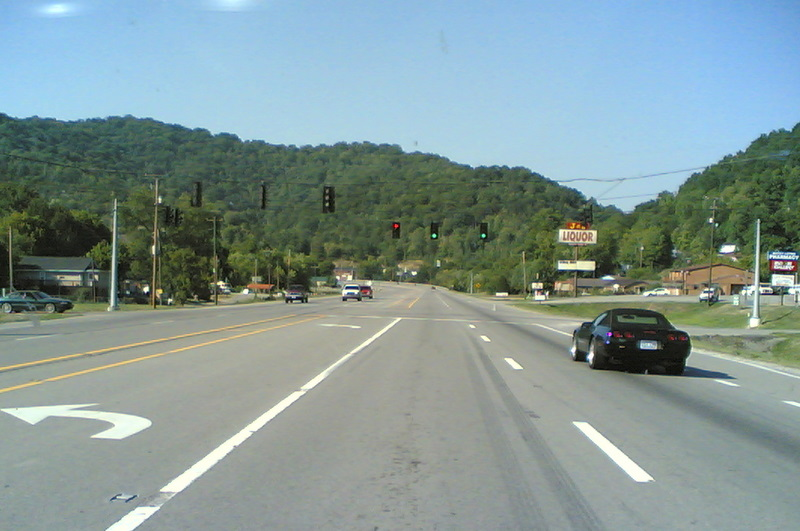
- U.S. 23 in Betsy Layne

- Location within the state of Kentucky
- Coordinates: 37°33′15″N 82°37′34″W
- Country: United States
- State: Kentucky
- County: Floyd
- Settled: 1875

Area
  - Total: 1.83 sq mi (4.75 km^{2})
  - Land: 1.81 sq mi (4.68 km^{2})
  - Water: 0.027 sq mi (0.07 km^{2})
- Elevation: 879 ft (268 m)

Population (2020)
  - Total: 651
  - Density: 360.0/sq mi (138.99/km^{2})
- Time zone: UTC-5 (Eastern (EST))
  - Summer (DST): UTC-4 (EDT)
- ZIP code: 41605
- FIPS code: 21-06220
- GNIS feature ID: 2629576

Betsy Layne is a census-designated place (CDP) and coal town in Floyd County, Kentucky, United States. It was established in 1875 along the Levisa Fork. The post office opened on May 1, 1908, with Clayton S. Hitchins as postmaster. Its ZIP code is 41605. The 2010 census reported the population to be 688. Stage actress Bette Henritze (born 1924) was a native of Betsy Layne.

Betsy Layne is located along the eastern border of Floyd County. It is bordered to the east by Pike County. U.S. Route 23 passes through the community, leading northwest 13 miles (21 km) to Prestonsburg and southeast 12 miles (19 km) to Pikeville.

In addition to being treated as a census-designated place by the United States Census Bureau, they also consider Betsy Layne and the nearby community of Stanville as a combined Census County Division (CCD). It had a population of 4,601 at the 2020 census. The CCD also includes the communities of Banner, Dana, Harold, Ivel and Tram.

== Demographics ==
Historical population
Census	Pop.	Note	%±
2020	651		—
U.S. Decennial Census

== Notable person ==
- Natasha Cornett – murderer sentenced to life imprisonment for the Lillelid murders
