= Statue of Abraham Lincoln (Prestonsburg, Kentucky) =

- Year: 2010
- Subject: Abraham Lincoln
- Dimensions: 62 ft (19 m)
- Weight: Over a ton
- Location: Prestonsburg, Kentucky; 37.650598°N 82.813495°W

The Middle Creek National Battlefield Seated Lincoln Statue is a sculpture located in Prestonsburg, Kentucky at the Middle Creek National Battlefield. Originally commissioned by lawyer Eric C. Conn and established in Stanville, Kentucky, the statue was later sold and relocated.

The statue is 19 feet (5.8 m) in height including the base of the statue, and the Lincoln statue itself is six feet (1.8 m) high. The statue has been called the 'Second Largest Seated Lincoln Statue in the World;' after the Abraham Lincoln Memorial on the National Mall. However, the seated Lincoln statue in Boise, Idaho, is taller at 9 feet (2.75 m) without a base.

== History ==
Conn at first commissioned smaller studies of what would become the statue. The statue was dedicated on November 4, 2010, the anniversary of the first and only Kentuckian elected to the White House. The stated purpose of the statue is to remind Kentuckians that Abraham Lincoln was born and spent many years of his youth in Kentucky. Conn reportedly financed the entire cost of the statue without any outside financial support. The cost of the statue was reported to be $500,000.

The statue was first located in a small town in rural Kentucky off of Highway U.S. 23. The estimated population of the rural town of Stanville, Kentucky is 415 based on the 2000 Census.

In July 2019, the statue was refurbished and relocated to the Middle Creek National Battlefield.

== Description ==
The statue and base stands almost 19 feet (5.8 m) in height. Conn maintained that the statue, if the concrete base is included, is the second-largest seated Lincoln statue in the world. The largest is the Abraham Lincoln Memorial on the National Mall in Washington, D.C. The statue is white with a white base.

A crane had to put the statue in place. It had to be delivered in three pieces due to the large size. The statue weighs over a ton, not counting its cement base that is 16 feet square (1.5 m^{2}) and six feet (1.8 m) high.

== See also ==
- List of statues of Abraham Lincoln
- List of sculptures of presidents of the United States
