= Prestonsburg High School =

Location
- 825 Blackcat Boulevard; Prestonsburg, KY 41653; 37.67694°N 82.78005°W

Information
- School type: Public
- School district: Floyd County Schools
- Superintendent: Tonya Horne-Williams
- Principal: Brandon Kidd
- Faculty: 31.50 (on FTE basis)
- Grades: 9–12
- Enrollment: 492 (2022-2023)
- Student to teacher ratio: 15.62
- Campus: Small town
- Color
- Team name: Blackcats
- Website: School website

Prestonsburg High School, located in Prestonsburg, Kentucky, is one of three public high schools in the Floyd County School District of eastern Kentucky

== Athletics ==
Prestonsburg High is a member of the Kentucky High School Athletic Association (KHSAA) and home to the Blackcats; the school colors are red, black, and white. Football games are played on the Josh Francis Memorial Field. Soccer, baseball, and softball games are played on Stone Crest. Basketball and volleyball games are played in the Blackcat Field House. Tennis matches are played on the tennis courts at Archer Park.

Starting the 2017 school year, Coach Brandon Gearheart ( a South Floyd High School alumni) has been named the Boys' Basketball team head coach. Mr. Gearheart has been the Girls' head coach for the past few years.
