= Leonard W. Roberts =

Leonard W. Roberts (January 28, 1912 - April 29, 1983) was an early folklorist, professor, and publisher.

== Early life ==
Roberts was born in Floyd County, Kentucky to Lewis Jackson and Rhoda Jane (Osborn) Roberts. He was educated in a one-room school before attending Pikeville High School. He left high school for a stint in the U.S. Army, but later returned to graduate. Thereafter, he attended Berea College where he received his BA in English and Music in 1939. He taught in Kentucky and North Carolina. He studied creative writing at the University of Iowa, earning a MA in 1943. He taught in the Army V-12 program at the University of North Carolina, Chapel Hill. He pursued a doctoral degree in Folklore Studies, which he continued at Indiana University and the University of Kentucky. In 1945, he returned to Berea College, teaching English in the Foundation School and later at Pine Mountain Settlement School (1950–1953). During this time, he encouraged his students to collect folktales and folk songs from their families. His folklore scholarship was distinctive for its emphasis on magic tales as he was one of only a few scholars collecting and publishing such material. His dissertation, which he completed in 1953, focused on his collection of folk narratives, mostly sound recordings from Leslie and Perry Counties. The University of Kentucky Press published it in 1953 as South from Hell-fer-Sartin: Kentucky Mountain Folktales. He thereafter taught at various colleges before accepting a position as professor at Pikeville College.

== Pikeville College ==
While at Pikeville College, he founded Pikeville College Press which published the literary journal Twigs (which later became Cumberlands), as well as numerous books of poetry and regional history. He also founded the Appalachian Studies Center. He served on the Board of the Preservation Council of Pike County. He edited Truda Williams McCoy's book The McCoys: Their Story (1976), which was the first account of the Hatfield-McCoy Feud from the McCoy perspective. In his career, Roberts also taught at the Berea Foundation School, Morehead State University, Union College (Kentucky), and West Virginia Wesleyan College.

== Death and legacy ==
Roberts was killed in a traffic accident and is buried in Ivel, Kentucky.

== Publications ==
- I Bought Me a Dog and Other Folktales from the Southern Mountains (Berea, KY: Council of the Southern Mountains), 1954. [reprinted in 1959 and 1972]
- South from Hell-fer-Sartin (Lexington, KY: University of Kentucky Press), 1955. [reprinted in 1987, ISBN 0-8131-1637-6]
- Nippy and the Yankee Doodle and More Folk Tales from the Southern Mountains (Berea, KY: Council of the Southern Mountains), 1958. [reprinted in 1963]
- Up Cutshin and Down Greasy: Folkways of a Kentucky Family (Lexington, KY: University of Kentucky Press), 1959. [reprinted in 1988, ISBN 0-8131-1638-4]
- Old Greasybeard: Tales from the Cumberland Gap (Pikeville, KY: Pikeville College Press), 1969. [reprinted in 1980]
- The McCoys: Their Story [as editor] (Pikeville, KY: Preservation Council Press), 1976. ISBN 0-916814-00-9
- In the Pine: Selected Kentucky Folksongs (Pikeville, KY: Pikeville College Press), 1978.
- The Couches Tales and Songs reprinted later as Sang Branch Settlers (Pikeville, KY: Pikeville College Press), 1980. ISBN 0-933302-05-3
