= Orcadia (disambiguation) =

Orcadia refers to the islands of Orkney.

Orcadia may also refer to:

== Places ==
- A hamlet in Rural Municipality of Orkney No. 244, Saskatchewan, Canada

== Ships ==
- Orcadia, a World War I Admiralty M-class destroyer
- Orcadia, a World War II Algerine-class minesweeper
- MV Orcadia (1962), an Orkney ferry built by Hall, Russell & Co, Aberdeen
- MV Orcadia (1977), a ferry owned by Pentland Ferries since 2015

== Biology ==
- Orcadia (protist), a genus of foraminifera in the order Globigerinida
- Orcadia (fungus), a genus of sac fungi in the order Pezizales

== Other uses ==
- A 2001 episode of the TV show Comedy Lab
