= Dwale =

Dwale may refer to:

- Dwale, Kentucky, a census-designated place
- Dwale (anaesthetic), an anaesthetic potion used in medieval medicine
- Atropa belladonna, a poisonous plant
