= Nelson Allen =

American politician

Member of the Kentucky Senate from the 18th district
- In office January 1, 1974 – January 1, 1991
- Preceded by: Luther K. Plummer
- Succeeded by: Charlie Borders

Personal details
- Party: Democratic

Nelson Robert Allen (October 27, 1933–April 28, 2005) was a former Kentucky state Senator renowned for his commitment to education. Allen was a resident of Greenup County, KY. He was born in Hueysville, Kentucky, Floyd County, Kentucky and received a master's degree in Education as well as an honorary doctorate from Morehead State University. He was also a Navy veteran of the Korean War.

Allen was elected to the state Senate in 1973 from the 18th District (which includes Greenup, Carter, Lewis, Mason, Bracken, and Robertson Counties) and served until 1991. He was chairman of the Senate Education Committee from 1976 to 1990 and was among the legislators most involved in crafting the landmark 1990 Kentucky Education Reform Act. Allen was named Most Colorful Senator in the 1976, 1978, 1980 and 1982 sessions by the Capitol Press Corps.

Allen was married to his wife for 40 years, Carol Lynne Rice Allen of Bellefonte, Kentucky, who was unsuccessful in her 2006 bid for the state Senate seat once held by her husband. He served as principal of Bellefonte and Russell Central Elementary Schools in the Russell Independent School district from 1960 to 1994. He also served as president of the Eastern Kentucky Education Association and was also elected to the Greenup County Fiscal Court, a position he held at the time of his death. Allen was also a well known college and high school basketball official.
