= Risner =

Risner is a surname. Notable people with the surname include:

- Dalton Risner (born 1995), American football player
- Friedrich Risner (c.1533–1580), German mathematician from Hersfeld, Hesse
- James Robinson Risner (1925–2013), United States Air Force general officer and fighter pilot

== See also ==
- Risner, Kentucky
