= Walter Gee =

Walter Gee may refer to:

- Walter Gee (trade unionist), British trade union leader and politician
- Walter Gee (American politician), member of the Kentucky House of Representatives
