= Trams in Oceania =

Trams in Oceania may refer to:

- Trams in Australia
- Trams in New Zealand

== See also ==
- Tram (disambiguation)
