= Pyramid, Kentucky =

Unincorporated community in Kentucky, United States

- Unincorporated community
- Location within the state of Kentucky Pyramid (the United States)
- Coordinates: 37°33′53″N 82°43′45″W
- Country: United States
- State: Kentucky
- County: Floyd
- Elevation: 679 ft (207 m)
- Time zone: UTC-5 (Eastern (EST))
  - Summer (DST): UTC-4 (EDT)
- GNIS feature ID: 508886

Pyramid is an unincorporated community located in Floyd County, Kentucky, United States.
