= Eric C. Conn =

American criminal

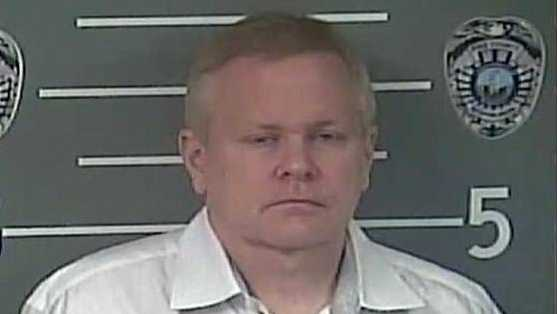
- Born: September 29, 1960 (age 65); Pikeville, Kentucky
- Other name: "Mr. Social Security"
- Occupation: Attorney (former)
- Known for: Social Security fraud scheme

Eric Christopher Conn (born September 29, 1960) is an American former attorney and convicted felon who is best known for his role in orchestrating the largest Social Security fraud scheme in United States history. The Social Security Administration estimated that Conn's fraud scheme cost the taxpayers around $550 million. He was captured in December 2017 after six months on the run and was subsequently sentenced to 27 years in prison.

== Early life and education ==
Conn was born in Pikeville, Kentucky, to a family with a long history of practicing law in the area. He attended Betsy Layne High School, where he excelled academically and participated in various extracurricular activities. After graduating in 1978, he attended Morehead State University, where he earned his bachelor's degree in 1982. He went on to earn his Juris Doctor degree from the Ohio Northern University College of Law in Ada, Ohio in 1987.

== Legal career ==
Eric C. Conn began his legal career in 1987, specializing in Social Security disability claims. He quickly gained a reputation as a highly successful and flamboyant attorney, known for his aggressive marketing tactics, such as purchasing billboards, radio and television ads, and using the nickname "Mr. Social Security." In the 1990s and 2000s, he became one of the top disability lawyers in the United States, managing a lucrative law firm based in Stanville, Kentucky, with clients spanning the entire country.

== Social Security fraud scheme ==
Conn's fraud scheme, which ran from 2004 to 2016, involved submitting thousands of falsified medical documents prepared by corrupt physicians. Conn bribed them to produce fraudulent medical evidence in order to support his clients' claims, often without even examining the clients. The submissions received unquestioning approval by corrupt Huntington-based judge David B. Daugherty, who took $609,000 in bribes from Conn to approve the unmerited disability claims. This enabled Conn to collect millions of dollars in fees, in total, from his clients and the Social Security Administration.

== Investigation and conviction ==
In 2011, The Wall Street Journal exposed Conn's fraud scheme, prompting an investigation by the U.S. Senate Committee on Homeland Security and Governmental Affairs. The investigation culminated in a 2013 report that detailed Conn's fraudulent activities and led to criminal charges being filed against him.

In March 2017, Conn pleaded guilty to one count of theft of government money and one count of payment of gratuities. He was placed under house arrest pending sentencing but cut off his electronic monitoring device in June 2017, becoming a fugitive-at-large. After six months on the run, Conn was captured in La Ceiba, Honduras and extradited to the United States. In September 2018, he was sentenced to 27 years in prison for his role in the fraud scheme. He remains in custody at FCI Fort Dix, New Jersey, 40 mi (64 km) from Philadelphia, Pennsylvania, with a scheduled release date of November 2039.

In addition, David B. Daugherty pleaded guilty to two counts of accepting illegal gratuities and was sentenced to four years in prison and required to pay restitution of $93 million. Daughtery was incarcerated in 2017 and died in prison in 2019, at age 83. As well, the psychologist who accepted bribes in exchange for signing false medical forms, Alfred Bradley Adkins, was convicted of wire fraud, mail fraud, conspiracy to commit fraud, and making false statements, receiving a sentence of 25 years in prison. He remains in custody at FCI Ashland, 5 mi (8.0 km) outside of Ashland, Kentucky, with a scheduled release date of December 2037.

== Legacy ==
=== Impacts on the Social Security disability system ===
The Eric C. Conn case raised significant concerns about the vulnerability of the Social Security disability system to fraud and led to reforms aimed at improving oversight and accountability. In the wake of the scandal, thousands of Conn's former clients were subject to claim re-evaluations, leading to financial hardship and distress for many individuals. This included clients who would otherwise have been approved for disability, but were unknowingly entangled by Conn's scheme to get their original benefits through his bribery and fraud rather than legitimate medical review and documentation.

=== The Big Conn ===
On 6 May 2022, Apple TV+ released a multi-part docuseries, called The Big Conn. The series was produced by McMillion$'s production company, FunMeter; an accompanying podcast was also produced for each episode.
