= Hi Hat, Kentucky =

Unincorporated community in Kentucky, United States

- Unincorporated community
- Location within the state of Kentucky Hi Hat (the United States)
- Coordinates: 37°23′30″N 82°43′45″W
- Country: United States
- State: Kentucky
- County: Floyd
- Elevation: 1,030 ft (310 m)
- Time zone: UTC-5 (Eastern (EST))
  - Summer (DST): UTC-4 (EDT)
- ZIP codes: 41636
- GNIS feature ID: 494104

Hi Hat is an unincorporated community and coal town located in Floyd County, Kentucky, United States. Its post office is still open.

== History ==
A post office was established in the community, then known as Fed, in 1881. In 1943, the coal town was renamed for the Hi Hat Elkhorn Mining Company.

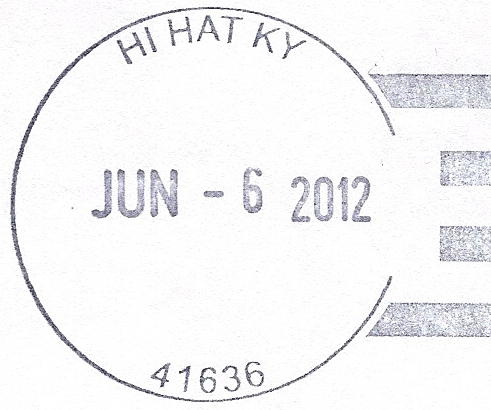

== Geography ==
Hi Hat is located on Kentucky Route 122 at the southern terminus of Kentucky Route 979. The community was once located at a dead end of the Long Fork Subdivision, a railroad line owned and operated by CSX Transportation that split from the E&BV Subdivision at Martin.

== Education ==
Hi Hat is served by the Floyd County School District and is home to South Floyd PK-8 School. The now-defunct South Floyd High School was also located here.
