= Robin L. Webb =

American politician (born 1960)

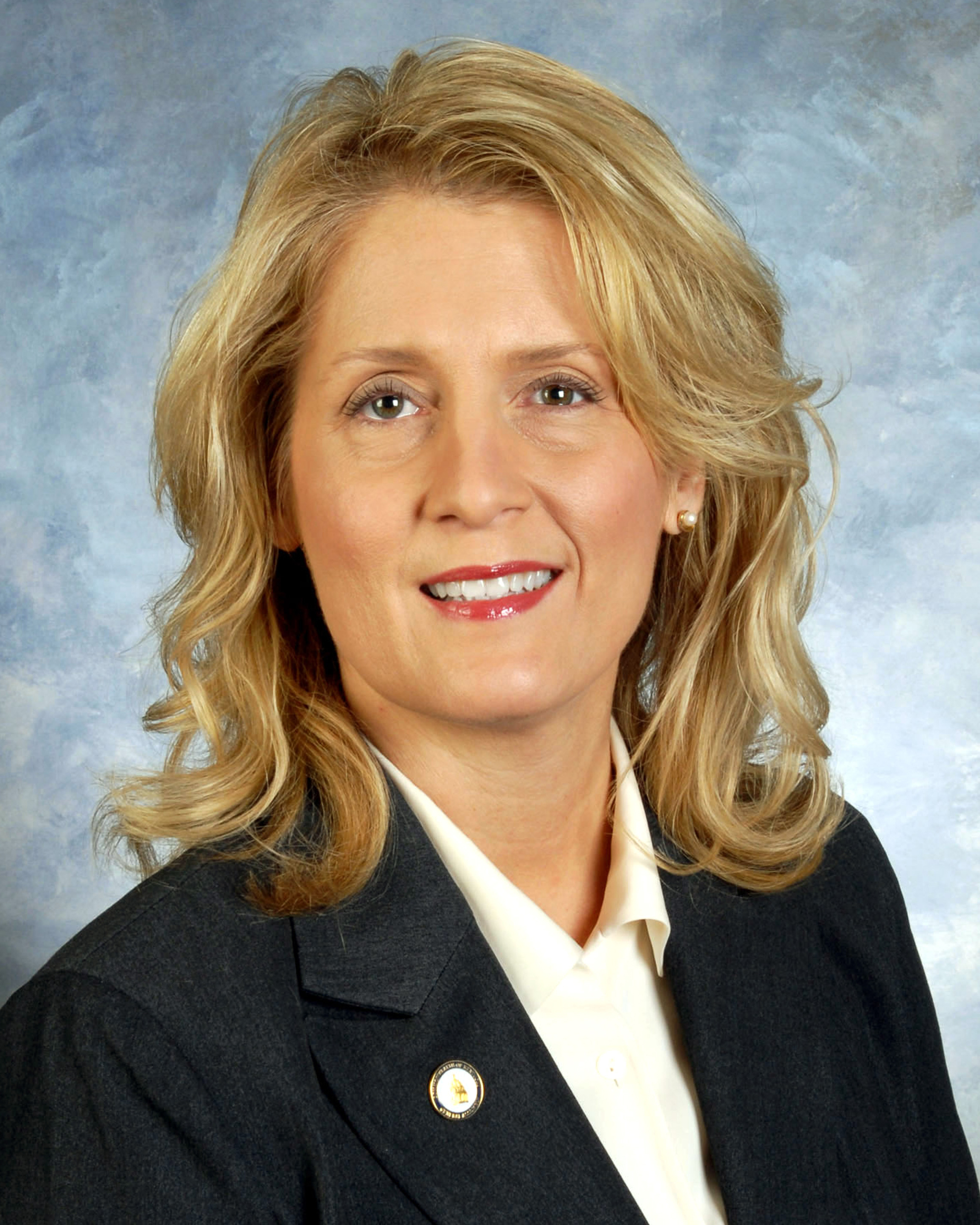
- Official portrait, 2008

Member of the Kentucky Senate from the 18th district
- Incumbent
- Assumed office September 1, 2009
- Preceded by: Charlie Borders

Member of the Kentucky House of Representatives from the 96th district
- In office January 1, 1999 – September 1, 2009
- Preceded by: Walter Gee
- Succeeded by: Jill York

Personal details
- Born: September 6, 1960 (age 65)
- Party: Democratic (before 2025); Republican (2025–present)
- Education: Morehead State University (AS, BS); Northern Kentucky University (JD)

Robin Lynn Webb (born September 6, 1960) is an American politician who is a member of the Kentucky Senate. Initially elected in 2009 as a Democratic candidate, she became a Republican on May 30, 2025. She represents the 18th district, which includes Boyd, Carter, Greenup, and Lewis Counties. At the time of her party switch, she was the last remaining Democratic senator to represent a district which had voted for a Republican candidate for president.

She formerly served as a member of the Kentucky State Representative for the 96th District from 1999 to 2009, resigning to run for Kentucky Senate. She was first elected to the house in 1998, defeating Republican Ramona Gee, the widow of previous representative Walter Gee, who had died in office between the primary and general elections.

Webb has a law office based in Grayson, Kentucky where she lives. She attended Morehead State University and obtained her AAS and BS. She furthered her education at Northern Kentucky University's Chase College of Law, obtaining her J.D. Robin worked as a coal miner until the age of 25. Her father, Dr. Robert Webb, was a member of the Kentucky Department of Fish and Wildlife Resources Commission for over 30 years.
