= Burton, Kentucky =

Unincorporated community in Kentucky, United States

- Unincorporated community
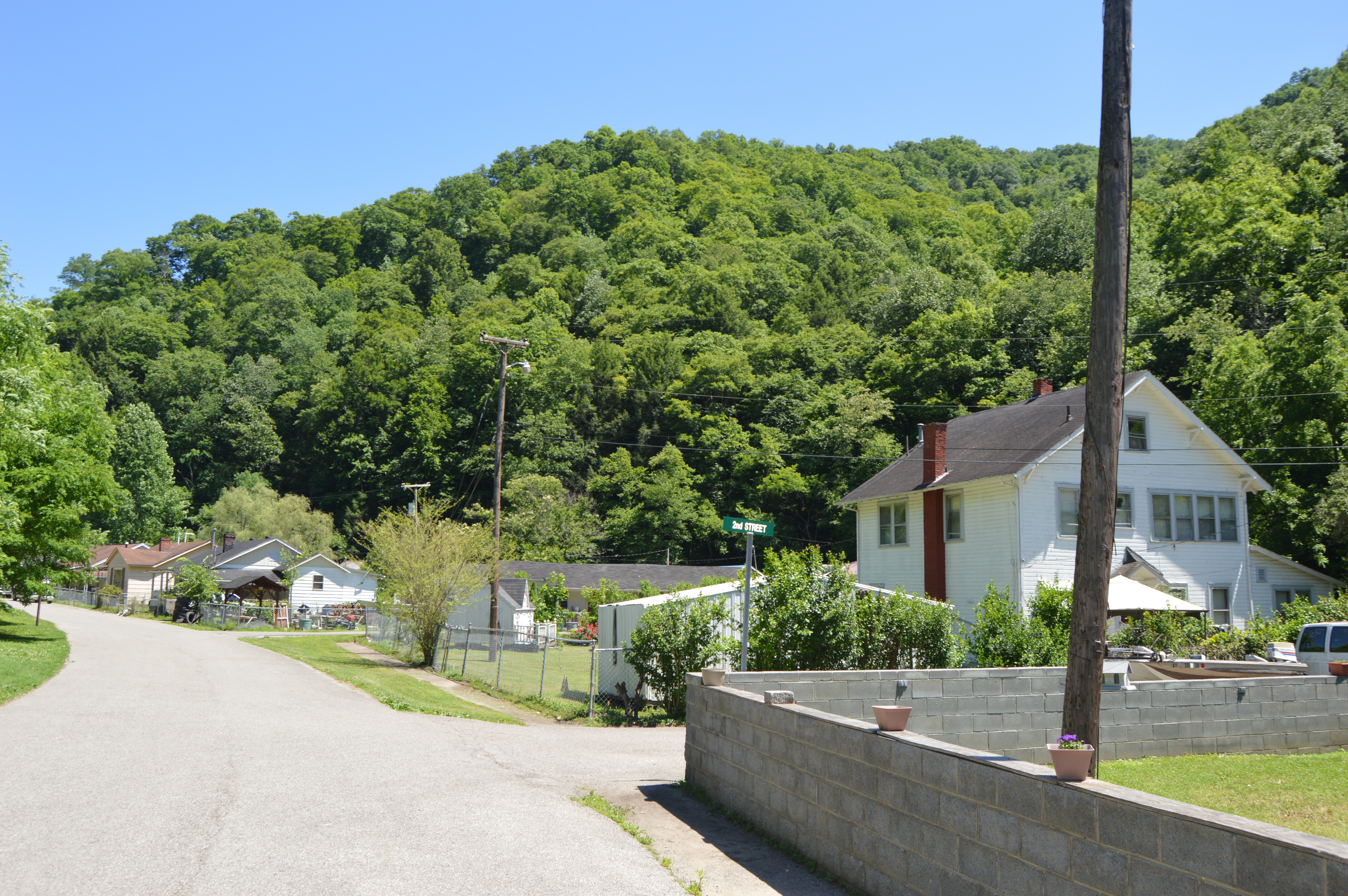
- Street scene in Lower Burton

- Location within the state of Kentucky Burton (the United States)
- Coordinates: 37°21′34″N 82°43′26″W
- Country: United States
- State: Kentucky
- County: Floyd
- Elevation: 909 ft (277 m)
- Time zone: UTC-5 (Eastern (EST))
  - Summer (DST): UTC-4 (EST)
- GNIS feature ID: 488469

Burton is an unincorporated community and coal town in Floyd County, Kentucky, United States.
