= Eastern, Kentucky =

Unincorporated community in Kentucky, United States

- Unincorporated community
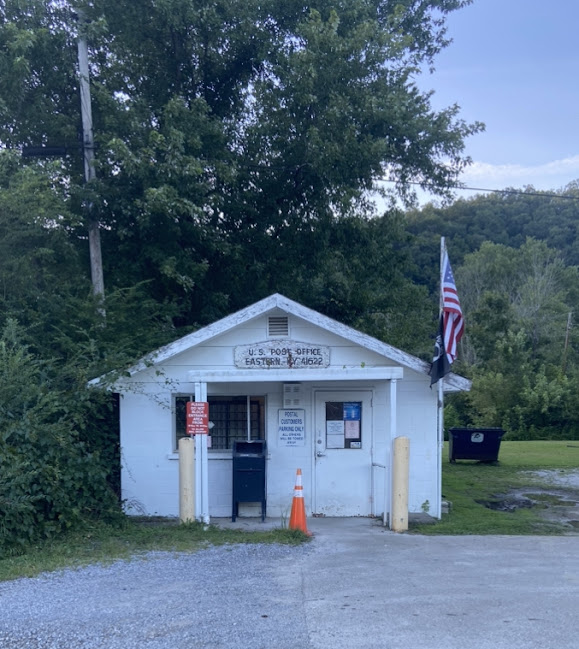
- Eastern post office

- Location within the state of Kentucky Eastern (the United States)
- Coordinates: 37°31′01″N 82°48′22″W
- Country: United States
- State: Kentucky
- County: Floyd
- Elevation: 673 ft (205 m)
- Time zone: UTC-5 (Eastern (EST))
  - Summer (DST): UTC-4 (EDT)
- ZIP codes: 41622
- Area code: 606
- GNIS feature ID: 491508

Eastern is an unincorporated community located in Floyd County, Kentucky, United States.

== Geography ==
Eastern is on Kentucky Route 80 and the eastern terminus of Kentucky Route 550. The western end of Kentucky Route 680 is south-southeast of the community.

== Education ==
Three Floyd County Schools are located in Eastern:

- James A. Duff Elementary School
- Allen Central Middle School
- Allen Central High School

A new Floyd Central High School is nearing completion in the community. It will replace both Allen Central High and South Floyd High School, and is expected to open in the fall of 2017. At that time, Allen Central will be converted into a technical education hub for the Floyd County school district.

Eastern has a public library, a branch of the Floyd County Public Library.

Allen Central High School's athletic teams are nicknamed the "Rebels." The school features various Confederate iconography.

== Notable people ==
- Stephen Cochran, country singer
- Sportscaster Kenny Rice, known nationally for his horse racing reporting, grew up in Eastern.
