= Floyd Central High School (Kentucky) =

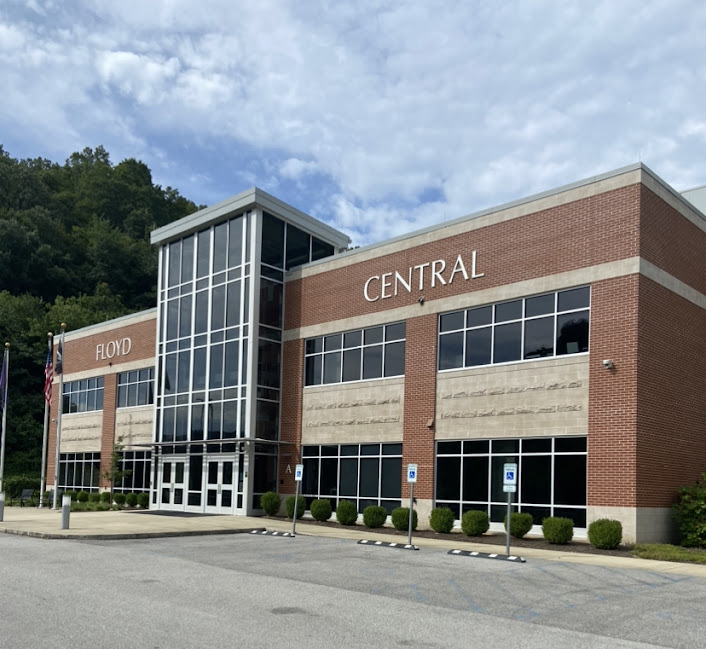
- Floyd Central in 2023

Location
- 651 Kentucky Route 680 West; Eastern, (Floyd County), Kentucky 41622; United States
- 37.4998°N 82.8042°W

Information
- School type: Public school (government funded), high school
- Established: 2017
- School district: Floyd County Schools
- Superintendent: Larry Hammond(interim)
- Principal: Greta Thornsberry
- Teaching staff: 35.00 (FTE)
- Grades: 9–12
- Enrollment: 530 (2023–2024)
- Student to teacher ratio: 15.14
- Campus: Rural: Remote
- Colors: Kentucky Teal, Black, Gold
- Athletics conference: KHSAA
- Nickname: Jaguars
- Feeder schools: Duff Allen Central Elementary School, May Valley Elementary School, and South Floyd Elementary
- Website: https://fchs.floyd.kyschools.us/

Floyd Central High School (FCHS) is a secondary school located in Floyd County, Kentucky, United States, that opened in September 2017. The high school is a consolidation of Allen Central High School and South Floyd High School. The school mascot is Jaguars. School colors are Kentucky Teal, Black, and Gold.

== Academics ==
Along with the standard curriculum, FCHS will also offer online college courses, AP & dual credit courses.

== JROTC ==
Keeping with decade old tradition that Allen Central High School had, FCHS will have their own JROTC unit.

== Sports ==
The Jaguars will compete in the 15th Region, 58th District in basketball, baseball, volleyball and softball. The football team will be aligned in Class 3A, District 6. Floyd Central also has golf, cheer leading, archery and also will be having a bass fishing team. In their first year in the Floyd County Conference, the golf team won the championship. In the first ever football game, the Jags beat Harlan High School.

== See also ==
- List of high schools in Kentucky
