= Solomon Stratton =

Solomon Stratton (c. 1745–1818) was an American soldier and frontiersman born in Amherst County, Virginia. He was a veteran of the Revolutionary War and George Rogers Clark's 1778 expedition to Illinois in which Fort Kaskaskia was captured from the British. After learning of the purpose and destination of the Clark's expedition, many of the Virginia recruits from west of the Alleghany mountains objected and returned to their homes. Stratton, along with a few other fellow Virginians, reasserted their commitments to Clark in the face of their neighbors' cowardice, and stayed through the completion of the expedition. In 1788, Solomon, accompanied by his sons, explored the Southern Appalachian region and in 1796 established one of the first settlements in what is now Eastern Kentucky. In 1797 he helped to found the city of Prestonsburg, Kentucky. He died in 1818 near present-day Stanville, Kentucky and was buried in an unmarked grave near the Big Sandy River.
