= Glo, Kentucky =

Unincorporated community in Kentucky, United States

- Unincorporated community
- Location within the state of Kentucky Glo (the United States)
- Coordinates: 37°26′52″N 82°48′34″W
- Country: United States
- State: Kentucky
- County: Floyd
- Elevation: 718 ft (219 m)
- Time zone: UTC-5 (Eastern (EST))
  - Summer (DST): UTC-4 (EDT)
- GNIS feature ID: 492920

Glo is an unincorporated community and coal town located in Floyd County, Kentucky, United States.
