= Estill, Kentucky =

Unincorporated community in Kentucky, United States

- Unincorporated community
- Location within the state of Kentucky Estill (the United States)
- Coordinates: 37°27′25″N 82°49′8″W
- Country: United States
- State: Kentucky
- County: Floyd
- Elevation: 935 ft (285 m)
- Time zone: UTC-5 (Eastern (EST))
  - Summer (DST): UTC-4 (EST)
- ZIP codes: 41627
- GNIS feature ID: 491820

Estill is an unincorporated community and coal town in Floyd County, Kentucky, United States.

== History ==
The community was said to have been named for Captain James Estill. The community also had a post office that closed in 1995.
