= Charlie Borders =

American politician

Member of the Kentucky Senate from the 18th district
- In office January 1, 1991 – July 15, 2009
- Preceded by: Nelson Allen
- Succeeded by: Robin L. Webb

Personal details
- Party: Republican
- Education: Morehead State University (B.S.), (M.B.A.)

Charlie Borders is a former Republican member of the Kentucky State Senate from January 1991 until his resignation in July 2009.

Borders, who attended Morehead State University, works in real estate in Greenup, Kentucky.

In 2009, Borders resigned from his legislative post to become a member of Kentucky's Public Service Commission. A special election was called to replace him, and Democratic candidate Robin L. Webb won.

== Sources ==
- article on Borders
