= Warco, Kentucky =

Unincorporated community in Kentucky, United States

- Unincorporated community
- Location within the state of Kentucky Warco (the United States)
- Coordinates: 37°32′39″N 82°46′33″W
- Country: United States
- State: Kentucky
- County: Floyd
- Elevation: 659 ft (201 m)
- Time zone: UTC-5 (Eastern (EST))
  - Summer (DST): UTC-4 (EDT)
- GNIS feature ID: 506212

Warco is an unincorporated community in Floyd County, Kentucky, United States.
