= Willie Edward Taylor Carver Jr. =

American author

Willie Edward Taylor Carver Jr. is an American educator and author from Floyd County, Kentucky. In 2021, Carver was named the 2022 Kentucky Teacher of the Year, after teaching French and English at Montgomery County High School. In 2022, he resigned from his position, citing homophobia, later that same year testifying before the United States House Oversight Subcommittee on Civil Rights and Civil Liberties.

Willie is the author of Gay Poems for Red States, a collection of narrative poems published by the University Press of Kentucky in 2023. Gay Poems for Red States was named a Book Riot 2023 Best Book of the Year, an IndieBound and American Booksellers Association's must-have book for poetry lovers, a Top Ten Best Book of Appalachia by Read Appalachia, a top ten 2022 Southern Book in Garden and Gun, and selected as a 2023 Over the Rainbow Book List book by the American Library Association. In 2024, it was named a Stonewall Book Award Honor Book and won a Whippoorwill Honor Award for Rural Young Adult Literature. Gay Poems for Red States has since been named a 2025 Judy Gaines Young Book Award nominee and the winner of a Rainbow Advocacy 2025 Award.

Carver has published poetry in Southern Humanities Review, North Meridian Review, Chase Law Review, Untelling Magazine, 2RulesofWriting, Another Chicago Magazine, Largehearted Boy, Smoky Blue Literary Magazine, Good River Review, Salvation South, The Louisville Review, Right Hand Pointing, Harbor Review, Young Ravens Literary Review, and Ghost City Press.

Carver is also the author of Tore All to Pieces, a fragmented novel about the lives of a fictional Appalachian community, published by the University Press of Kentucky in 2026. His creative writing has been published by Salvation South, Untelling Magazine, North Meridian Review, and in a variety of anthologies and books, including Trouble in Censorville (Disobedience Press), Had I a Dove (Red Hawk Publications), Discarded (Backwoods Literary Press), and Rural Education and Queer Identities (Routledge).

Carver currently works at the University of Kentucky Gatton College of Business and Economics as an academic advisor. He contributes to MSNBC and Heinemann.

In 2023, he was featured on Good Morning America 3, where he spoke about the need for stories that reflect students' experiences.
