= Orkney (disambiguation) =

Orkney may refer to:

== Places ==
=== Scotland ===
- Orkney, an archipelago in Scotland, also known as the Orkney Islands
  - Mainland, Orkney, the largest island in the Orkney archipelago
  - Orkney (Scottish Parliament constituency), the constituency for the Orkney Islands in the Scottish Parliament in Edinburgh
  - Orkney Islands Council, the local authority for Orkney

=== Antarctica ===
- South Orkney Islands, a group of islands in the South Atlantic Ocean.

=== South Africa ===
- Orkney, North West, a mining town in South Africa
- Orkney Snork Nie, a sitcom in Afrikaans set in Orkney, North West Province

=== Canada ===
- Rural Municipality of Orkney No. 244, Saskatchewan
- Orkney, Saskatchewan, a village

=== United States ===
- Orkney, Kentucky

== See also ==
- Orkney and Shetland (UK Parliament constituency) the constituency for Orkney in the British Parliament in London
- Orkney Movement, part of an electoral coalition, the Orkney and Shetland Movement, formed for the 1987 UK general election
- Heart of Neolithic Orkney, a World Heritage Site on Mainland Orkney
