= Dwale, Kentucky =

Census-designated place in Kentucky, United States

- Census-designated place
- Location in Kentucky
- Coordinates: 37°37′15″N 82°43′38″W
- Country: United States
- State: Kentucky
- County: Floyd

Area
  - Total: 0.63 sq mi (1.63 km^{2})
  - Land: 0.61 sq mi (1.58 km^{2})
  - Water: 0.023 sq mi (0.06 km^{2})
- Elevation: 758 ft (231 m)

Population (2020)
  - Total: 239
  - Density: 392.2/sq mi (151.43/km^{2})
- Time zone: UTC-5 (Eastern (EST))
  - Summer (DST): UTC-4 (EDT)
- ZIP code: 41621
- Area code: 606
- FIPS code: 21-23104
- GNIS feature ID: 2629606

Dwale is an unincorporated community and census-designated place in Floyd County, Kentucky, United States. As of the 2020 census, Dwale had a population of 239.

The origins of the name Dwale are unclear. Although it is said to have been named after a town in Wales, no such Welsh place name has been found.

== Geography ==
Dwale is located in north-central Floyd County on the west side of the Levisa Fork, just north of Allen. U.S. Route 23 passes through Dwale, leading northwest 5 miles (8 km) to Prestonsburg, the county seat, and southeast 22 miles (35 km) to Pikeville.

According to the U.S. Census Bureau, the Dwale CDP has a total area of 0.67 square miles (1.74 km^{2}), of which 0.66 square miles (1.70 km^{2}) is land and 0.02 square miles (0.04 km^{2}), or 2.57%, is water.

== Demographics ==
Historical population
Census	Pop.	Note	%±
2020	239		—
U.S. Decennial Census
