= Blue Moon, Kentucky =

Unincorporated community in Kentucky, United States

- Unincorporated community
- Location within the state of Kentucky Blue Moon (the United States)
- Coordinates: 37°30′27″N 82°41′52″W
- Country: United States
- State: Kentucky
- County: Floyd
- Elevation: 902 ft (275 m)
- Time zone: UTC-5 (Eastern (EST))
  - Summer (DST): UTC-4 (EDT)
- GNIS feature ID: 507533

Blue Moon is an unincorporated community located in Floyd County, Kentucky, United States.

A post office was established in 1936 by Alex L. Meade, a local schoolteacher. The name was selected by Meade's daughter Alice, who had received a bottle of Blue Moon perfume as a Christmas present. The post office closed in 1957.
