= Bonanza, Kentucky =

Unincorporated community in Kentucky, United States

- Unincorporated community
- Location within the state of Kentucky Bonanza (the United States)
- Coordinates: 37°41′31″N 82°51′50″W
- Country: United States
- State: Kentucky
- County: Floyd
- Elevation: 686 ft (209 m)
- Time zone: UTC-5 (Eastern (EST))
  - Summer (DST): UTC-4 (EDT)
- GNIS feature ID: 507547

Bonanza is an unincorporated community in Floyd County, Kentucky, United States.

== History ==
The Bonanza post office closed in July 1969.

== Notable person ==
- George G. Hatcher, former Secretary of State of Kentucky.
