= Tram (disambiguation) =

A tram, tramcar, or streetcar, is an urban rail transit type in which vehicles, whether individual railcars or multiple-unit trains, runs primarily on streets; also used in mining.

Tram (or trams) may also mean:

== Transport ==
- TRAM (company), a Spanish transportation company in Barcelona
- Aerial tramway
- Light rail, an urban rail transit type running on streets, similar to a tram
- Trackless train, sometimes called parking lot trams or just "trams"
- Tramcar (Wildwood), Boardwalk, Wildwood, New Jersey, US
- Transit Museum Society (TRAMS), Vancouver, Canada
- Transporte Metropolitano de la Plana (TRAM), the trolleybus system in Castellón de la Plana
- TramCité the Quebec city tramway

== Acronym ==
- TRAM (genetic), genetic systems with Turnover, Redundancy And Modularity
- TRAM flap, Transverse Rectus Abdominis Myocutaneous flap, in surgical breast reconstruction
- Texture memory, in computer storage
- Target Recognition and Attack Multi-Sensor system, on U.S. Navy A-6E Intruder aircraft
- Teatr RAbochey Molodyozhi, the Russian acronym for Leningrad Workers' Youth Theatre
- TRAnsputer Module, see Transputer § TRAMs

== Other uses ==
- Tram (band)
- Tram (film), a short animation
- Tram, Kentucky
- Tram-34 a blocker of calcium-activate potassium channels
- "The Tram", an episode of the Italian TV series Door into Darkness
- Caesura, a musical symbol known as "tram-lines" in the UK

== See also ==
- Tramway (disambiguation)
