= Jump Station, Kentucky =

Unincorporated community in Kentucky, United States

Coordinates: 37.4928775°N 82.7562701°W

Jump Station is an unincorporated community in Floyd County, Kentucky.

== History ==
A post office called Jump was established in 1927, and remained in operation until 1953. The community has the name of one Mr. Jump, a businessperson in the local mining industry.
