= Alphoretta, Kentucky =

Unincorporated community in Kentucky, United States

- Unincorporated community
- Location within the state of Kentucky Alphoretta (the United States)
- Coordinates: 37°33′47″N 82°45′52″W
- Country: United States
- State: Kentucky
- County: Floyd
- Elevation: 692 ft (211 m)
- Time zone: UTC-5 (Eastern (EST))
  - Summer (DST): UTC-4 (EDT)
- GNIS feature ID: 485898

Alphoretta is an unincorporated community and coal town in Floyd County, Kentucky, United States.
