= Hippo, Kentucky =

Unincorporated community in Kentucky, United States

- Unincorporated community
- Location within the state of Kentucky Hippo (the United States)
- Coordinates: 37°31′15″N 82°52′8″W
- Country: United States
- State: Kentucky
- County: Floyd
- Elevation: 745 ft (227 m)
- Time zone: UTC-5 (Eastern (EST))
  - Summer (DST): UTC-4 (EDT)
- ZIP codes: 41637
- GNIS feature ID: 508252

Hippo is an unincorporated community located in Floyd County, Kentucky, United States.

A post office was established in the community in 1902 and named for local resident Bee Madison "Hippo" Craft. At the time "hippo," short for hypochondriac, was Southern slang for an irritable and complaining person, something Craft was apparently known for in town.

Their post office closed in June 1996.
