= Wonder, Kentucky =

Unincorporated community in Kentucky, United States

- Unincorporated community
- Location within the state of Kentucky Wonder (the United States)
- Coordinates: 37°38′1″N 82°36′24″W
- Country: United States
- State: Kentucky
- County: Floyd
- Elevation: 728 ft (222 m)
- Time zone: UTC-5 (Eastern (EST))
  - Summer (DST): UTC-4 (EDT)
- GNIS feature ID: 509399

Wonder is an unincorporated community located in Floyd County, Kentucky, United States. It is on Kentucky Route 3385.
