= Cliff, Kentucky =

Unincorporated community in Kentucky, United States

- Unincorporated community
- Location within the state of Kentucky Cliff (the United States)
- Coordinates: 37°40′53″N 82°46′50″W
- Country: United States
- State: Kentucky
- County: Floyd
- Elevation: 623 ft (190 m)
- Time zone: UTC-5 (Eastern (EST))
  - Summer (DST): UTC-4 (EST)
- GNIS feature ID: 489665

Cliff is an unincorporated community and coal town in Floyd County, Kentucky, United States. Their post office closed in 1973.
