= Bette Henritze =

American actress (1924–2018)

- Born: May 23, 1924; Betsy Layne, Kentucky, U.S
- Died: February 22, 2018 (aged 93); Lynbrook, New York, U.S
- Other name: Bette Howe
- Occupations: Actress, singer
- Years active: 1949-2009

Bette Joan Henritze (May 23, 1924 – February 22, 2018) was an American actress of stage, film, and television.

She played supporting roles in films like The World According to Garp, The Hospital, Far From Heaven, and Judy Berlin. She was most known for her work in Off-Broadway theatre. In 1967 she received the Obie Award for Best Actress for excellence in Off-Broadway work in the 1966-1967 theatre season.

== Personal life ==
Henritze was born in Betsy Layne, Kentucky, the daughter of Ada (née Howell; 1905–1983) a secretary, and William Price Henritze (1901–1982), an electrician. She moved to New York City to study theatre at the American Academy of Dramatic Arts and the HB Studio.

== Theatre ==
She made her Broadway debut in 1948 in Jenny Kissed Me, credited as Bette Howe. In 1950 Henritze was performing with the company at the Barter Theatre in Virginia. As a member of the Phoenix Theatre Company at the Phoenix Theatre in New York City (a now defunct off-Broadway house) she began performing with them in their 1959 production of The Power and the Glory as a peasant woman. She followed this with Lysistrata as Nikodike and in 1960 with performances in Peer Gynt, She Stoops to Conquer, and The Plough and the Stars as Bessie. In 1963, she was in the original cast of the Edward Albee play The Ballad of the Sad Café, starring Colleen Dewhurst.

She had made her Off-Broadway debut in 1956 performing in two plays by playwright Seán O'Casey, Purple Dust and Pictures in the Hallway. She also acted in several productions with the New York Shakespeare Festival including The Merchant of Venice, The Winter's Tale, and King Lear. In 1963, she played Mary Todd Lincoln in Abe Lincoln in Illinois at the Phoenix and then at Circle in the Square she played Emilia in Othello in 1964 and various roles in their 1965 production of Baal by Bertolt Brecht.

In 1967, Henritze was the only female acting recipient of the Obie Award for Best Actress in Off-Broadway theatre. She received the award after being hailed for her performances in Measure for Measure as Mariana, The Long Christmas Dinner as Ermengarde, Queens of France as Mademoiselle Pointevin, The Displaced Person as Mrs. Shortley, The Rimers of Eldritch as Mary Windrod, and All's Well That Ends Well as Mariana. She followed this in 1968 with the Broadway musical Here's Where I Belong, that closed after one performance.

In 1970, she portrayed Anna Ames in The Happiness Cage, later reprising her role in the film version The Happiness Cage. In 1972, she played Ursula in Much Ado About Nothing on Broadway, and performed in the musical Lotta. In 1974, she was in the original Broadway cast alongside Janie Sell and Phyllis Somerville of Over Here!, which was nominated for the Tony Award for Best Musical. In 1978, she played Susan Ramsden in Man and Superman. In 1979, she appeared in the Roundabout Theatre Company production of A Month in the Country, which starred Tammy Grimes. In 1985, she was in the original cast of The Octette Bridge Club on Broadway. The following year, she performed with Marisa Tomei in Daughters, off-Broadway.

In 1989 she played Eva Temple in Orpheus Descending which starred Vanessa Redgrave. In 1990 she was in the original cast of Lettice and Lovage on Broadway which starred Maggie Smith and Margaret Tyzack. Her last Broadway credits were in Inherit the Wind in 1996, and the original cast of Waiting in the Wings by Noël Coward in 1999.

== Film ==
Henritze made her film debut in the Oscar-winning film The Hospital (1971). In 1972 she played a role in Rage. In the same year, she played Anna Krauss in The Mind Snatchers with Joss Ackland and Christopher Walken (1972). In 1982 she appeared in the Oscar nominated film, The World According to Garp, and in 1986 Brighton Beach Memoirs as Mrs. Murphy. In 1991 she played Emma in Other People's Money and in 1998 as Mrs. Skinner in The Object of My Affection. In 1999, she played Dolores Engler in Judy Berlin. In 2002, Henritze appeared in the Oscar nominated film Far from Heaven as Mrs. Leacock, and in 2009 she appeared as Annie in Taking Woodstock.

== Television ==
Henritze made her television debut on the series The Edge of Night and next appeared on The Defenders and East Side/West Side. She played the Mother in The Dangerous Christmas of Red Riding Hood starring Liza Minnelli in 1965. In 1973 she got to play the role of Ursula she had played Off-Broadway and on Broadway in Much Ado About Nothing when it was filmed for television. In 1996 she was in the cast of the Emmy Award-winning television movie, Harvest of Fire.

== Death ==
On February 22, 2018, Henritze died in Lynbrook, New York, at the age of 93.
