= Hueysville, Kentucky =

Unincorporated community in Kentucky, United States

- Unincorporated community
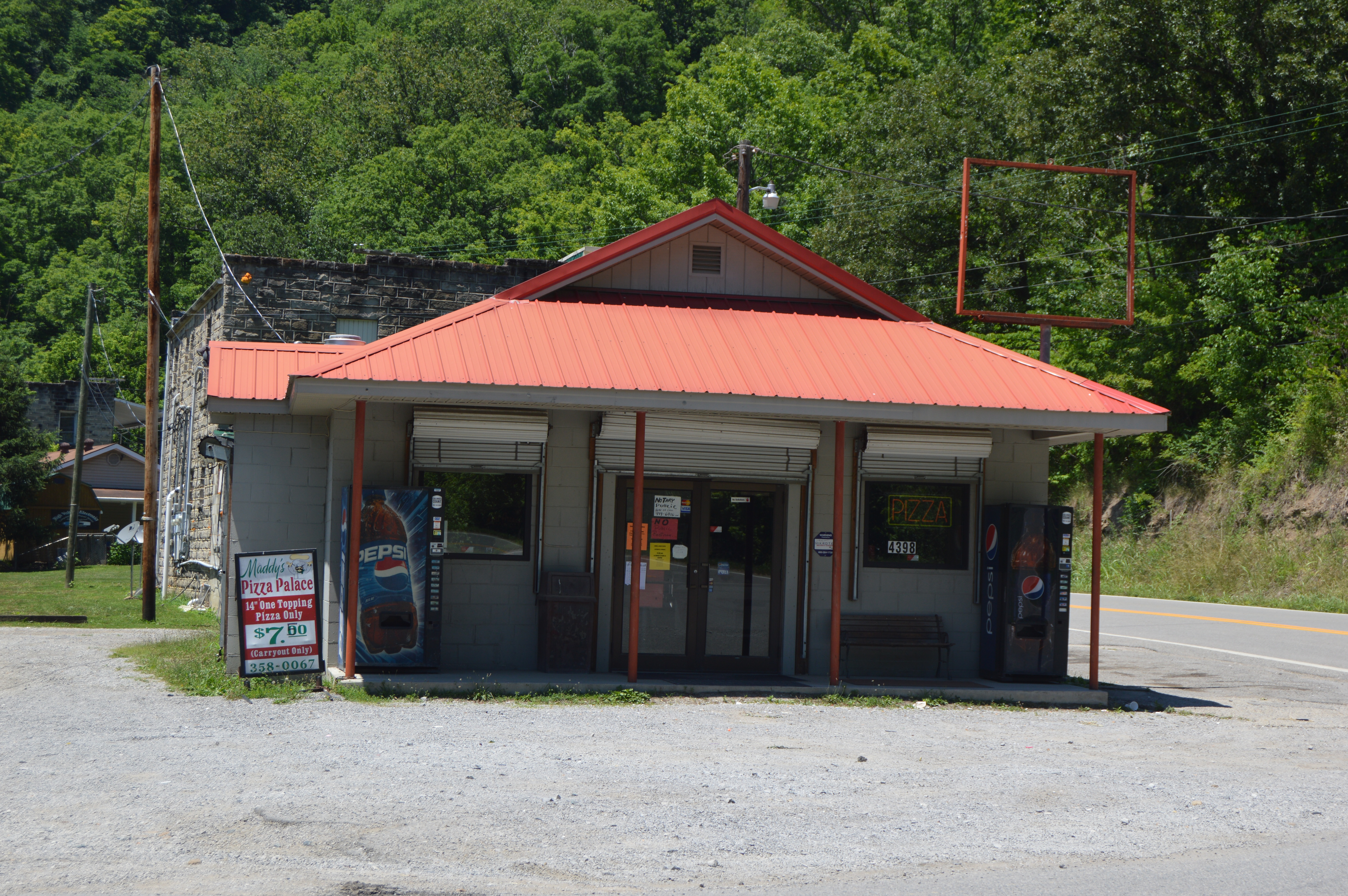
- Restaurant at the junction of Kentucky Routes 7 and 550, east of Hueysville

- Location within the state of Kentucky Hueysville (the United States)
- Coordinates: 37°29′55″N 82°50′28″W
- Country: United States
- State: Kentucky
- County: Floyd

Government
- Elevation: 715 ft (218 m)
- Time zone: UTC-5 (Eastern (EST))
  - Summer (DST): UTC-4 (EST)
- GNIS feature ID: 487709, 2097294

Hueysville, also known as Bosco, is an unincorporated community in Floyd County, Kentucky, United States. It has a post office with a ZIP Code of 41640. Hueysville is located on Salt Lick Creek Road (former Kentucky Route 7) west of Kentucky Route 550 (former KY 80). CSX Transportation's E&BV Subdivision passes through Hueysville. It is also on Kentucky Route 80.

== History ==
A post office was established in Hueysville in 1858 and was known as Hueysville from 1887 to 1889, when postmaster Mike Staley changed the name to Mike. A post office named Bosco also served the area from 1902 to 1916, when service was transferred to Hueysville. On January 19, 1990, a loaded CSX coal train was involved in a freak accident near Hueysville, when the train struck a rockslide while passing through a tunnel. The rockslide caused the train to derail, causing part of the tunnel to collapse. Kentucky Route 550 was shut down as it passes over the tunnel, and the collapse made the road unsafe. The derailment and collapse caushighwayhe road and railroad to remain closed for an extended period, causing many businesses to suffer in Hueysville since the accident cut off traffic between Hueysville and Eastern.

== Notable person ==
- Nelson Allen, Democratic Kentucky State Senator.
