= Bypro, Kentucky =

Unincorporated community in Kentucky, United States

- Unincorporated community
- Location within the state of Kentucky Bypro (the United States)
- Coordinates: 37°21′34″N 82°43′16″W
- Country: United States
- State: Kentucky
- County: Floyd
- Elevation: 948 ft (289 m)
- Time zone: UTC-5 (Eastern (EST))
  - Summer (DST): UTC-4 (EST)
- ZIP codes: 41612
- GNIS feature ID: 2097308

Bypro is an unincorporated community and coal town in Floyd County, Kentucky, United States. Their post office closed in 2004. It was also known as Coal.
