= Walter Gee (American politician) =

American politician

Member of the Kentucky House of Representatives from the 96th district
- In office January 1, 1991 – May 28, 1998
- Preceded by: Gene Cline
- Succeeded by: Robin L. Webb

Personal details
- Born: 1927
- Died: May 28, 1998 (aged 70)
- Party: Republican

Walter Gee (1927 – May 28, 1998) was an American politician from Kentucky who was a member of the Kentucky House of Representatives from 1991 to 1998. Gee was first elected in 1990, defeating incumbent Democratic representative Gene Cline. He died in office in May 1998 and was succeeded by Democrat Robin L. Webb, who defeated his wife Ramona in the general election.
