= Ivel, Kentucky =

Unincorporated community in Kentucky, United States

- Unincorporated community
- Location within the state of Kentucky Ivel (the United States)
- Coordinates: 37°35′28″N 82°40′6″W
- Country: United States
- State: Kentucky
- County: Floyd
- Elevation: 643 ft (196 m)
- Time zone: UTC-5 (Eastern (EST))
  - Summer (DST): UTC-4 (EDT)
- ZIP codes: 41642
- GNIS feature ID: 508321

Ivel is an unincorporated community and coal town in Floyd County, Kentucky, United States.

== History ==
A post office was established in the community in 1905. The town takes its name from the Ivy Creek.

On November 8, 2004, an NGL pipeline failed in a housing division in the community. The vapor cloud from the leak ignited, seriously burning a Kentucky State Trooper evacuating those living in the area. Eight others were injured, and five houses were destroyed. The pipeline, only 65 miles (105 km) long, had 11 previous corrosion failures. Installed in the 1950s, the ruptured 4-inch steel transmission line belonged to Kentucky-West Virginia Gas Co., a division of Equitable Gas in Pittsburgh. Still, it was operated by Colorado-based Mark West Hydrocarbon. Investigators found external corrosion and a small hole in the pipeline.

== Notable person ==
Leonard W. Roberts, an early folklorist, professor, and publisher, was killed in a car accident and is buried in Ivel.
