= Betsy Layne High School =

Public school in Betsy Layne, Floyd County, Kentucky, United States

Location
- 554 Bobcat Blvd; Betsy Layne, Kentucky 41605; United States
- Coordinates: 37°33′46″N 82°38′16″W

Information
- School type: Public school (government funded), high school
- School district: Floyd County Schools
- NCES District ID: 2101950
- CEEB code: 180215
- NCES School ID: 210195000406
- Principal: Jody Roberts
- Teaching staff: 26.00 (FTE)
- Grades: 9–12
- Gender: Coed
- Enrollment: 412 (2023–2024)
- Student to teacher ratio: 15.85
- Campus: Rural
- Colors: Blue and White
- Nickname: Bobcats
- Feeder schools: Betsy Layne Elementary School, John M. Stumbo Elementary School
- Website: blhs.floyd.kyschools.us

Betsy Layne High School (BLHS) is a secondary school located in Betsy Layne, Floyd County, Kentucky, United States, and is one of three public high schools in the Floyd County School system.
