= Risner, Kentucky =

Human settlement in the United States of America

- Unincorporated community
- Location within the state of Kentucky Risner (the United States)
- Coordinates: 37°35′12″N 82°50′25″W
- Country: United States
- State: Kentucky
- County: Floyd
- Elevation: 709 ft (216 m)
- Time zone: UTC-5 (Eastern (EST))
  - Summer (DST): UTC-4 (EDT)
- GNIS feature ID: 508942

Risner is an unincorporated community in Floyd County, in the U.S. state of Kentucky.

== History ==
A post office called Risner was established in 1923 and remained in operation until 1984. The community was named after a family of settlers.
