= Orkney, Kentucky =

Unincorporated community in Kentucky, United States

- Unincorporated community
- Location within the state of Kentucky Orkney (the United States)
- Coordinates: 37°25′48″N 82°44′7″W
- Country: United States
- State: Kentucky
- County: Floyd
- Elevation: 741 ft (226 m)
- Time zone: UTC-5 (Eastern (EST))
  - Summer (DST): UTC-4 (EDT)
- GNIS feature ID: 508757

Orkney is an unincorporated community and coal town in Floyd County, Kentucky, United States. It was also known as Mouth of Spewing Camp.
