= Floyd County Schools (Kentucky) =

School district in Kentucky, United States

Location
- 106 North Front Avenue, Prestonsburg (Floyd County) Kentucky 41653 United States
- Coordinates: 37.668104°N 82.775696°W

District information
- Type: Public
- Grades: Pre-Kindergarten to 12
- Superintendent: Anna Shepherd
- Schools: 13
- Budget: $61,411,000 (2008-2009 school year)
- NCES District ID: 2101950.

Students and staff
- Students: 6,050
- Teachers: 390.70 (on an FTE basis)
- Student–teacher ratio: 15.49

Other information
- Website: www.floyd.kyschools.us

Floyd County Schools is the school district created to serve the public education needs of Floyd County, Kentucky.

The district has 13 schools serving a total of about six thousand students.

The school district comprises seven elementary schools :

- Allen Elementary School, Allen serving grades PK-8
- Betsy Layne Elementary School, Betsy Layne serving grades PK-8
- Duff-Allen Central Elementary School, Eastern serving grades PK-8
- John M. Stumbo Elementary School, Grethel serving grades PK-8
- May Valley Elementary School, Martin serving grades PK-8
- Prestonsburg Elementary School, Prestonsburg serving grades PK-5
- South Floyd Elementary School, Hi Hat serving grades PK-8

At the end of the 2016–17 school year, McDowell and Osborne Elementary closed. The two schools consolidated into a single school at the campus that was occupied by South Floyd High School, which also closed at that time.

There is one middle school serving grades 6-8:

- James D. Adams Middle School, Prestonsburg

And three high schools serving grades 9-12:

- Floyd Central High School, Eastern
- Betsy Layne High School, Betsy Layne
- Prestonsburg High School, Prestonsburg

At the end of the 2016–17 school year, Allen Central and South Floyd closed and consolidated into the new Floyd Central High School at a new campus in Eastern.

There are also some schools organized for non-traditional learning:

- Floyd County Area Technology Center, Martin, a trade school open to all county high school students.
- Home Instruction Elementary, Prestonsburg
- Home Instruction H.S., Prestonsburg
- Renaissance Learning Center, The local alternative school located in Martin

In 2020, the Floyd County School of Innovation opened in the same building that houses RLC. Students go for half a day to take classes related to STEM.
