= South Floyd High School =

Location
- 299 Mount Raider Drive; Hi Hat, (Floyd County), Kentucky 41636; United States; 37.382675°N 82.73494°W

Information
- School type: Public school (government funded), high school
- Established: 1993
- School district: Floyd County Schools
- NCES District ID: 2101950
- CEEB code: 181770
- NCES School ID: 210195000472
- Principal: Stacy Shannon
- Faculty: 17.40 (on an FTE basis)
- Grades: 9–12
- Enrollment: 266 (2015–16)
  - Grade 9: 73
  - Grade 10: 75
  - Grade 11: 57
  - Grade 12: 61
- Student to teacher ratio: 17.01
- Campus: Rural: Remote
- Colors: Black, Silver, and Purple
- Nickname: Raiders
- Feeder schools: South Floyd Middle School

South Floyd High School (SFHS) was a secondary school located in Hi Hat, Floyd County, Kentucky, U.S.A., and was one of five public high schools in the Floyd County School system.

The school closed at the end of the 2016–17 school year. Along with Allen Central High School, it was consolidated into the new Floyd Central High School. The South Floyd campus remains in use as an elementary school, absorbing the current McDowell and Osborne Elementary Schools.

== Administration ==
South Floyd High School Principal was Stacy Shannon South Floyd .
