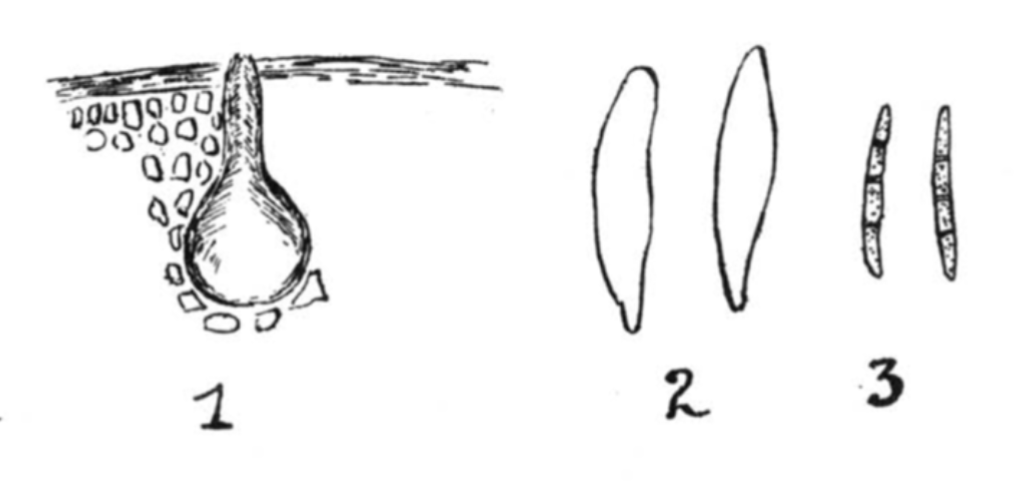
- First illustration of Orcadia ascophylli by Sutherland in 1914

Scientific classification
- Domain: Eukaryota
- Kingdom: Fungi
- Division: Ascomycota
- Class: Pezizomycetes
- Order: Pezizales
- Genus: Orcadia; G.K. Sutherland 1914

Species
- O. ascophylli; O. pelvetiana

= Orcadia (fungus) =

Genus of fungi

Orcadia is a genus of marine parasitic ascomycete fungi described in 1914 by Geo. K. Sutherland, classified initially as a member of the Hypocreales within the Pyrenomycetes. Its taxonomic position is uncertain, although it is currently placed in the order Pezizales, in the class Pezizomycetes.

== Description ==
Orcadia is characterized by an absence of stromata; perithecia entirely immersed in the thallus of their host through a long tapering beak; soft, white walls of perithecia that never become black; cylindrical or clavate asci, containing 8 septate spores; and the presence of paraphyses.

== Distribution ==
The species O. ascophylli was originally described from the Orkney Islands (Scotland). It is also common at Aberystwyth (Wales), where it parasites on old worn thalli of Ascophyllum nodosum. The species O. pelvetiana is found in Orkney and Clare Island, where it parasites Pelvetia canaliculata.
