= Bushwick Leaders High School for Academic Excellence =

Public school in New York City

Coordinates: 40°41′43″N 73°55′39″W

- 797 Bushwick Avenue; Brooklyn, NY 11221

Information
- Type: Public
- Established: 2002
- Principal: Enrique Garcia
- Enrollment: 415
- Website: http://www.bushwickleaders.org

Bushwick Leaders High School for Academic Excellence (BLHS) was a small New York City Public High School located in Bushwick, Brooklyn.

== History ==
Bushwick Leaders High School was opened in 2002 serving only 9th graders and starting with fewer than 100 students. The school served 9th through 12th graders with more than 400 students on its roster at peak enrollment. Its original location was 271 Melrose Street.

The creator and principal of Bushwick Leaders is Catherine Reilly, who was asked to step down in 2020

In 2019, the high school was placed on the state status list due to low state test scores, notably in math. The school later announced it would be closing in 2022 and merging with neighboring schools.

== Advanced Placement (AP) and Honors ==
Several AP and Honors courses could be taken at Bushwick Leaders such as AP Spanish, AP Statistics, and AP Chemistry.

== See also ==
- Education in New York City
- List of high schools in New York City
