= Stanville, Kentucky =

Unincorporated community in Kentucky, United States

- Unincorporated community
- Location in Kentucky
- Coordinates: 37°33′48″N 82°38′33″W
- Country: United States
- State: Kentucky
- County: Floyd
- Elevation: 718 ft (219 m)
- Time zone: UTC-5 (Eastern (EST))
  - Summer (DST): UTC-4 (EDT)
- ZIP code: 41659
- Area code: 606
- GNIS feature ID: 2629684

Stanville (formerly Mare Creek) is an unincorporated community in Floyd County, Kentucky, United States. It had a population of 415 in 2000.

== History ==
Stanville has a statue of Abraham Lincoln, which was relocated there from nearby Prestonsburg.

== Notable people ==
- Dan Jack Combs, Kentucky Court of Appeals judge and Kentucky Supreme Court justice.
- Eric C. Conn, former attorney and convicted criminal, managed a lucrative law firm in Stanville in the 1990s and 2000s, becoming one of the top disability lawyers in the US, and had clients from all over the country.
- Solomon Stratton, soldier and explorer, died in Stanville.
- Grady Wallace, All-American basketball player, born in Mare Creek.
