= Orcadia riedeli =

Orcadia riedeli Temporal range: Pleistocene–Present, 2.59–0 Ma

Scientific classification
- Domain: Eukaryota
- Clade: Diaphoretickes
- Clade: SAR
- Clade: Rhizaria
- Phylum: Retaria
- Subphylum: Foraminifera
- Class: Globothalamea
- Order: Globigerinida
- Family: Globigerinellidae
- Genus: Orcadia; Boltovskoy & Watanabe, 1982
- Species: O. riedeli

Binomial name
- Orcadia riedeli (Rögl & Bolli, 1973) Boltovskoy & Watanabe, 1982

Synonyms
- Hastigerinella riedeli Rögl & Bolli, 1973; Hastigerinopsis riedeli (Rögl & Bolli, 1973) Poore, 1979; Berggrenia riedeli (Rögl & Bolli, 1973) Saito, Thompson & Breger, 1981

Genus of shelled amoebae

Orcadia riedeli is a planktonic marine foraminifera. It is the only species in the monotypic genus Orcadia. It was originally classified in the genus Hastigerinella. It is found in the surface water of oceans and has a cosmopolitan distribution. The phylogenetic position of this genus remains enigmatic; it was originally assigned to the family Hastigerinidae, but was later moved to Globigerinellidae, in the order Globigerinida.

== Taxonomy ==
The species Hastigerinella riedeli, described in 1973, was transferred into a separate genus Orcadia in 1982 by Argentinian paleontologists Esteban Boltovskoy and Silvia Watanabe, thus originating the name Orcadia riedeli. It was provisionally assigned to the family Hastigerinidae in order Globigerinida, until the year 2022, when a new classification of planktonic foraminifera placed it in the family Globigerinellidae.

== Description ==
Orcadia riedeli is a species characterized by a low trochospiral and thin test; an interiomarginal, extraumbilical to umbilical aperture with a rounded lip; and triangular spines located in the distal areas of the test chambers.

== Ecology & distribution ==
Orcadia riedeli is a planktonic microorganism with a cosmopolitan distribution. It is found in the sea surface from polar to tropical oceans. It has been reported from the temperate eastern North Atlantic Ocean and the Atlantic sector of the Antarctic Ocean. It has also been reported more recently in the Indian sector of the Antarctic Ocean, specifically in the subtropical front, where it may account for up to 7% of the total planktonic foraminiferal stock in the water surface. This indicates a potential expansion of the geographical range of O. riedeli, since early sampling campaigns of the Indian sector in the 1970s did not record this species.
