= 2022 shooting of Kentucky police officers =

Mass shooting in Kentucky, U.S.

- Location: Allen, Kentucky, United States
- Date: June 30, 2022 c. 6:44 p.m.
- Target: Responding police officers in Floyd County, Kentucky
- Attack type: Mass shooting, shootout, ambush
- Weapons: .308-caliber rifle Several AR-15–style rifles
- Deaths: 3
- Injuries: 4
- Perpetrator: Lance Preston Storz

On June 30, 2022, a mass shooting involving police officers occurred in Allen, Kentucky, United States. Three police officers and a police dog were killed, and four others were injured, including three police officers. The shooter, 49-year-old Lance Storz, was arrested and charged with murder and attempted murder of a police officer.

== Shooting ==
Floyd County Sheriff John Hunt reported that around 2:30 p.m. on June 30, an officer received a phone call from someone who said that Lance Storz was holding a woman against her will and abusing her. The officer and another went to the home, where the woman was outside, and went with officers, who found Storz to be still inside the home. Storz's home was on an elevated spot that had a clear field of fire for about 200 yards with one single-lane road leading up to the property. With testimony from the woman, officers procured a protection order for the woman and went to Storz's home to arrest him over the assault allegations.

The shooting began at around 6:44 p.m. when four sheriff's deputies arrived at a residence in Allen, Kentucky, to serve an emergency protective order related to a domestic violence situation. According to a witness, the gunman used the butt of a firearm to break out a window in front of the home and then began firing out of it. Another reported that when they arrived they saw Storz pull back his blinds in a window and then open his front door and begin to open fire.

Additional police officers responded shortly after. The Floyd County Sheriff described the shooting as "planned". Officers were forced to retreat under their patrol vehicles, with at least one of them suffering carbon monoxide poisoning as a result. The suspect surrendered hours later after negotiations that included his family members. Storz was taken into custody around 10:00 pm outside his home.

== Victims ==
Two police officers – Floyd County Deputy Sheriff William Petry, who was also a former SRO at Floyd County Schools and a Kentucky State Police Trooper, and Prestonsburg Police Department Captain Ralph Frasure – died at the scene. A third officer also with the Prestonsburg Police Department, Jacob R. Chaffins, died in the hospital on July 1, the day after the shooting. K9 police dog Drago also died on the scene.

Three other officers were injured; two remained hospitalized in stable condition, while the third was treated and released. An emergency management official was also injured. The injuries were due to glass, shrapnel, gunfire, and other debris. In November 2022, a deputy underwent surgery to have his leg amputated due to injuries he sustained from the shooting.

== Perpetrator ==
The gunman, 49-year-old Lance Preston Storz (October 1972 – February 28, 2023), had been living in Allen for more than a year. Storz previously lived in St. Petersburg, Florida, before moving to Kentucky. Neighbors described him as friendly and helpful prior to the shooting. Throughout his life, Storz had both an extensive traveling history and extensive criminal history, with his criminal history dating back to the 1990s while living in the Orlando Area city of DeLand, Florida.

=== Legal proceedings ===
On July 1, the day after the shooting, Storz was arraigned on multiple charges, including two counts of murder of a police officer. One of the charges was originally the attempted murder of a police officer. However, the judge announced at the hearing that the charge had been upgraded to murder. He pleaded not guilty and was jailed on a $10 million bond, and his next court appearance was scheduled for July 11.

=== Suicide ===
On February 28, 2023, Storz was found dead of an apparent suicide inside his jail cell at the Pike County Detention Center. Authorities reported that Storz hanged himself near the bathroom area of his cell.

== Aftermath ==
A large memorial was created outside of Prestonburg City Hall and the Floyd County Courthouse. The Prestonsburg Police Department posted on its Facebook page that they were transporting the bodies of two of the deceased officers from Frankfort towards Martin, with the route locations for those who wished to pay their respects.

== Response ==
Governor Andy Beshear used social media to post about the shooting on the morning of July 1, highlighting the tragic loss of the officers and asking for prayers for the community. Kentucky Attorney General Daniel Cameron also posted to social media highlighting the heroic actions of the officers and their sacrifices.
