= Dana, Kentucky =

Unincorporated community in Kentucky, United States

- Unincorporated community
- Location within the state of Kentucky Dana (the United States)
- Coordinates: 37°33′15″N 82°41′28″W
- Country: United States
- State: Kentucky
- County: Floyd
- Elevation: 712 ft (217 m)
- Time zone: UTC-5 (Eastern (EST))
  - Summer (DST): UTC-4 (EST)
- ZIP codes: 41615
- GNIS feature ID: 507809

Dana is an unincorporated community in Floyd County, Kentucky, United States. It is located on U.S. Route 23 and Kentucky Route 1426. It also has a terminus on Kentucky Route 3381.
