= Tram, Kentucky =

Unincorporated community in Kentucky, United States

- Unincorporated community
- Location in Kentucky
- Coordinates: 37°34′10″N 82°38′51″W
- Country: United States
- State: Kentucky
- County: Floyd
- Elevation: 820 ft (250 m)
- Time zone: UTC-5 (Eastern (EST))
  - Summer (DST): UTC-4 (EDT)
- ZIP code: 41663
- Area code: 606
- GNIS feature ID: 2629696

Tram is an unincorporated community in Floyd County, Kentucky, United States.
