= Allen, Kentucky =

- City
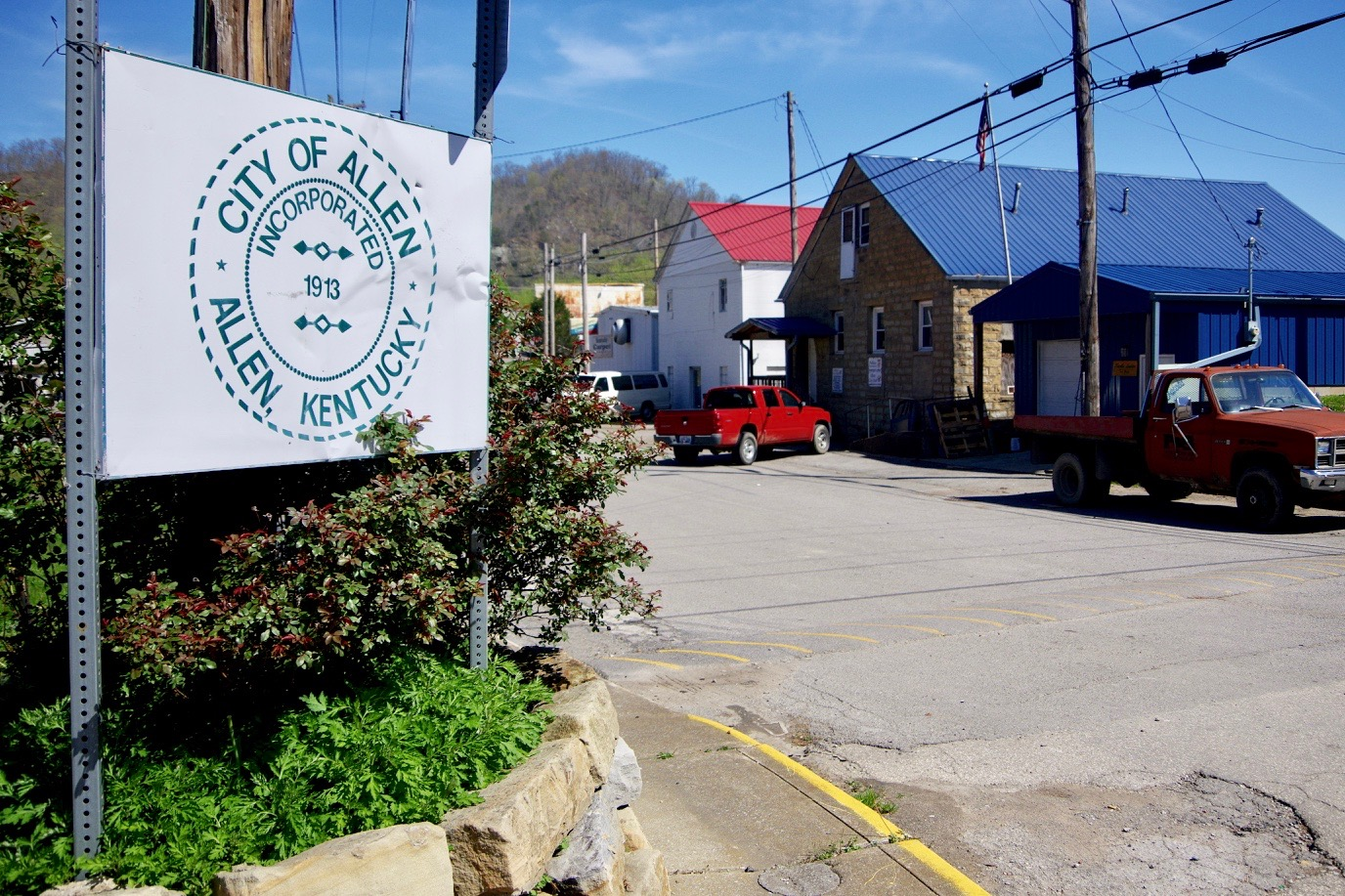
- Main Street in Allen
- Nickname: Allen City
- Location of Allen in Floyd County, Kentucky.
- Coordinates: 37°36′34″N 82°43′40″W
- Country: United States
- State: Kentucky
- County: Floyd
- Incorporated: 1913

Government
  - Type: City Commission

Area
  - Total: 0.19 sq mi (0.50 km^{2})
  - Land: 0.18 sq mi (0.46 km^{2})
  - Water: 0.015 sq mi (0.04 km^{2})
- Elevation: 643 ft (196 m)

Population (2020)
  - Total: 182
  - Density: 1,018.7/sq mi (393.33/km^{2})
- FIPS code: 21-00946
- GNIS feature ID: 0485866

Allen, also known as Allen City, is a home rule-class city in Floyd County, Kentucky, in the United States. As of the 2020 census, Allen had a population of 182.

== History ==
Allen was first settled in the early 19th century. The first post office was named "Mouth of Beaver" and was established on August 21, 1854 (Thomas P. Johns, postmaster). The town began to develop rapidly c. 1904-1905 after the establishment of a Chesapeake and Ohio Railway station. The station was interchangeably known as "Beaver Creek" and "Beaver Creek Junction". In 1905, another post office opened and was named "Allen" after local resident T.J. Allen. The town was formally incorporated by the state assembly in 1913. In 1936, the railroad station was renamed to prevent confusion during mail delivery. An area outside the city limits known as "New Allen" began to develop in 1937 after a bridge was constructed across the Levisa Fork River.

On October 16, 1981, a mass shooting occurred, when 70-year-old William Bevins shot eight people at an auto parts store, killing five and wounding three others. The shooting was sparked by a dispute with one of the victims.

On June 30, 2022, a mass shooting targeting police officers occurred in Allen. Three police officers and a police dog were killed, and four other people were injured, including three officers. The alleged shooter, 49-year-old Lance Storz, was arrested and charged with murder and attempted murder of a police officer.

== Geography ==
According to the United States Census Bureau, Allen has a total area of 0.2 square miles (0.5 km^{2}), of which 0.02 square miles (0.04 km^{2}), or 7.06%, is water.

== Demographics ==
Historical population
Census	Pop.	Note	%±
1920	216		—
1930	284		31.5%
1940	368		29.6%
1950	421		14.4%
1960	370		−12.1%
1970	724		95.7%
1980	338		−53.3%
1990	229		−32.2%
2000	150		−34.5%
2010	193		28.7%
2020	182		−5.7%
U.S. Decennial Census

As of the census of 2010, there were 193 people, 67 households residing in the city. There were 67 housing units. The racial makeup of the city was 99.48% White, 0.00% African American, 0.00% Hispanic or Latino, 0.00% Asian or Pacific Islander, 0.00% Native American and 0.52% from two or more races.
