= Floyd County, Kentucky =

County in Kentucky, United States

- County
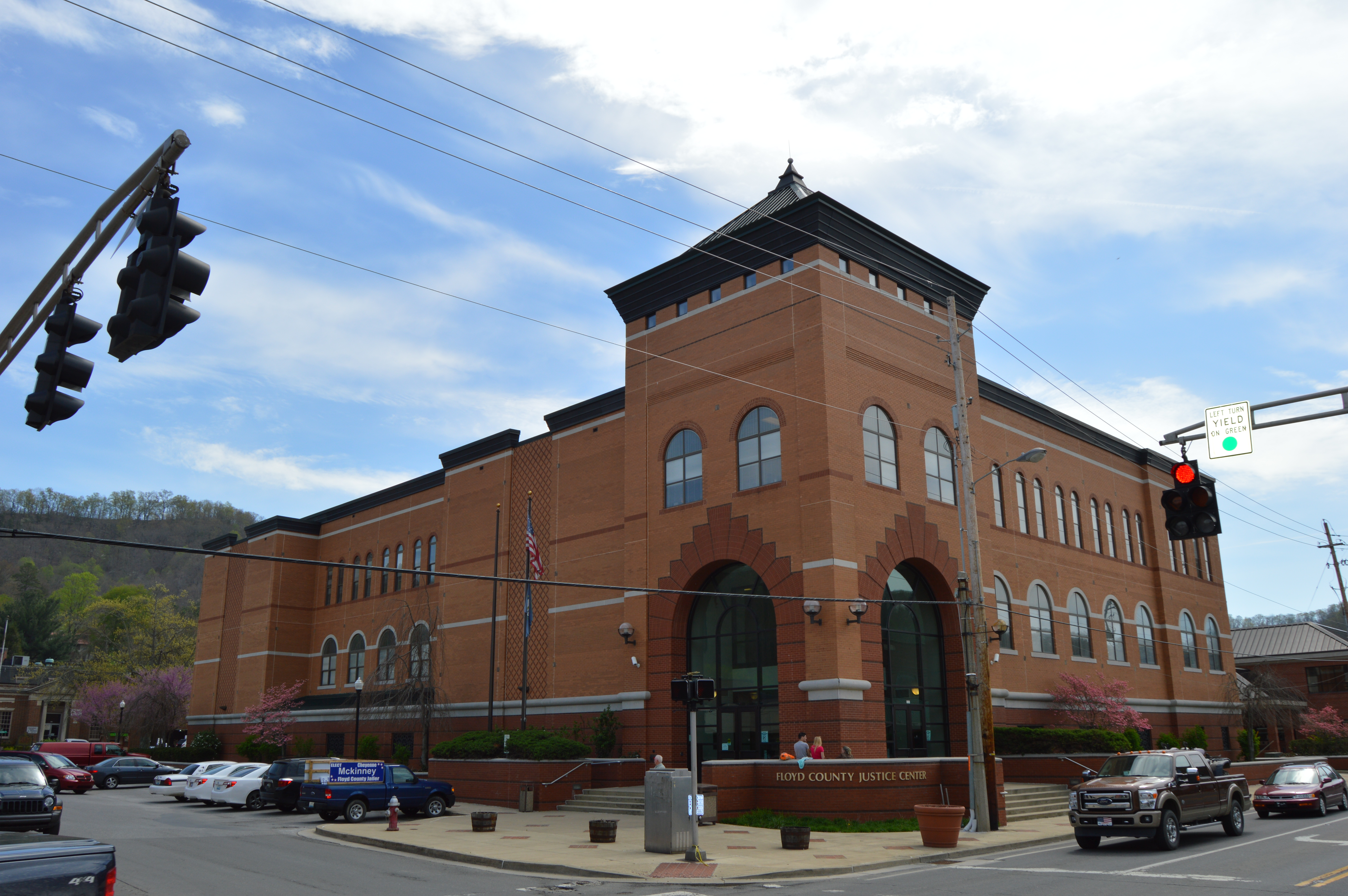
- Floyd County Courthouse

- Location within the U.S. state of Kentucky
- Coordinates: 37°34′N 82°45′W
- Country: United States
- State: Kentucky
- Founded: 1800
- Named for: John Floyd
- Seat: Prestonsburg
- Largest city: Prestonsburg

Government
  - Judge/Executive: Robbie Williams (I)

Area
  - Total: 396 sq mi (1,030 km^{2})
  - Land: 393 sq mi (1,020 km^{2})
  - Water: 2.4 sq mi (6.2 km^{2}) 0.6%

Population (2020)
  - Total: 35,942
  - Estimate (2025): 34,401 ▼
  - Density: 91.5/sq mi (35.3/km^{2})
- Time zone: UTC−5 (Eastern)
  - Summer (DST): UTC−4 (EDT)
- Congressional district: 5th
- Website: www.floydcountykentucky.com

Floyd County is a county located in the U.S. state of Kentucky. As of the 2020 census, the population was 35,942. Its county seat is Prestonsburg. The county, founded in 1800, is named for Colonel John Floyd (1750–1783).

== History ==
On December 13, 1799, the Kentucky General Assembly passed legislation to form Floyd County as the 40th county of Kentucky. The county was made from parts of Fleming, Montgomery, and Mason County, Kentucky. The legislation became effective on June 1, 1800. The county was named for James John Floyd, a pioneer surveyor who helped lay out the city of Louisville. The county seat was Preston's Station, later renamed Prestonsburg. The first court house burned down on April 8, 1808, destroying all the early records, so the earliest records of government activity do not date prior to 1808. Prestonsburg was used as a Confederate stronghold during the Civil War and two battles took place nearby, the Battle of Ivy Mountain on November 8, 1861, and the Battle of Middle Creek on January 10, 1862. Both were Union victories.

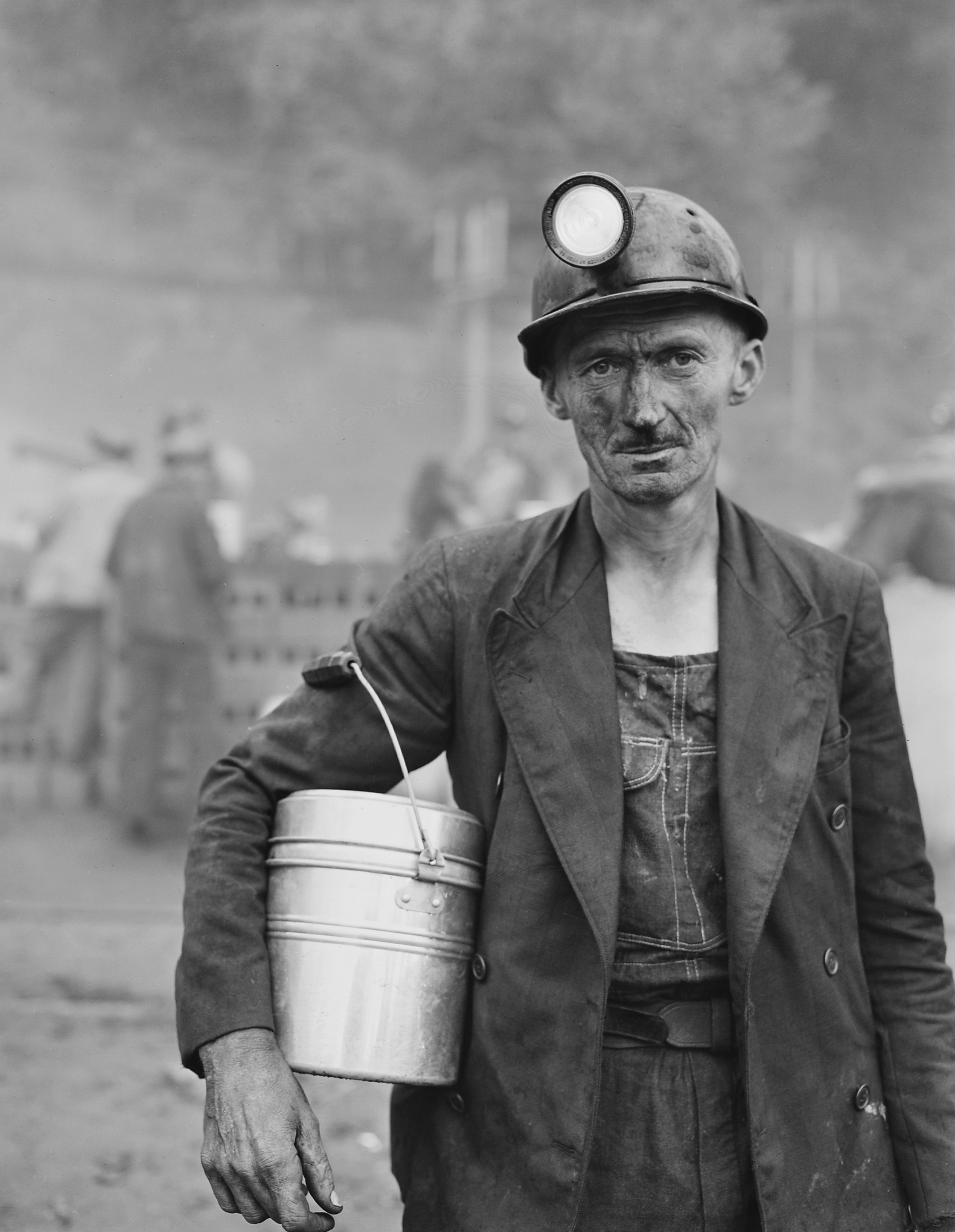
A coal miner in Wheelwright, Kentucky, 1946

Since the early 1900s, coal mining has had a large presence in Floyd County. In 1900, the first commercial coal mine in eastern Kentucky was opened in the Floyd County community of Betsy Layne. Soon, coal would become the dominant industry in Floyd County. With the arrival of coal, coal towns began popping up all over the county. These coal towns included Wheelwright, Bypro, Emma, Garrett, Wayland, and many more. By 1950, the county had a population of over 50,000 people. With the decline of coal in eastern Kentucky, people began migrating away from the area in large numbers, in what's known as the Hillbilly Highway. As of 2016, the county had 23 coal mines in operation, and produced roughly around 640,000 tons of coal.

On February 28, 1958, the county was the site of one of the deadliest bus accidents in U.S. history, leaving 27 people dead.

On October 16, 1981, a mass shooting occurred in Allen, when 70-year-old William Bevins shot eight people at an auto parts store, killing five and wounding three others. Bevins was arrested and sentenced to death. He died of a stroke in May 1989 before his sentence could be carried out.

On June 30, 2022, a mass shooting targeting police officers occurred in Allen, a city in Floyd County. Three police officers and a police dog were killed, and four other people were injured. The alleged shooter, 49-year-old Lance Storz, was arrested and charged with murder and attempted murder of a police officer before committing suicide in the county jail.

== Geography ==
According to the United States Census Bureau, the county has a total area of 396 square miles (1,030 km^{2}), of which 393 square miles (1,020 km^{2}) is land and 2.4 square miles (6.2 km^{2}) (0.6%) is water.

=== Adjacent counties ===
- Johnson County (north)
- Martin County (northeast)
- Pike County (east)
- Knott County (southwest)
- Magoffin County (northwest)

== Demographics ==
Historical population
| Census | Pop. | Note | %± |
|---|---|---|---|
| 1810 | 3,485 | | — |
| 1820 | 8,207 | | 135.5% |
| 1830 | 4,347 | | −47.0% |
| 1840 | 6,302 | | 45.0% |
| 1850 | 5,714 | | −9.3% |
| 1860 | 6,388 | | 11.8% |
| 1870 | 7,877 | | 23.3% |
| 1880 | 10,176 | | 29.2% |
| 1890 | 11,256 | | 10.6% |
| 1900 | 15,552 | | 38.2% |
| 1910 | 18,623 | | 19.7% |
| 1920 | 27,427 | | 47.3% |
| 1930 | 41,942 | | 52.9% |
| 1940 | 52,986 | | 26.3% |
| 1950 | 53,500 | | 1.0% |
| 1960 | 41,642 | | −22.2% |
| 1970 | 35,889 | | −13.8% |
| 1980 | 48,764 | | 35.9% |
| 1990 | 43,586 | | −10.6% |
| 2000 | 42,441 | | −2.6% |
| 2010 | 39,451 | | −7.0% |
| 2020 | 35,942 | | −8.9% |
| 2025 (est.) | 34,401 | ▼ | −4.3% |
U.S. Decennial Census; 1790-1960 1900-1990; 1990-2000 2010-2020

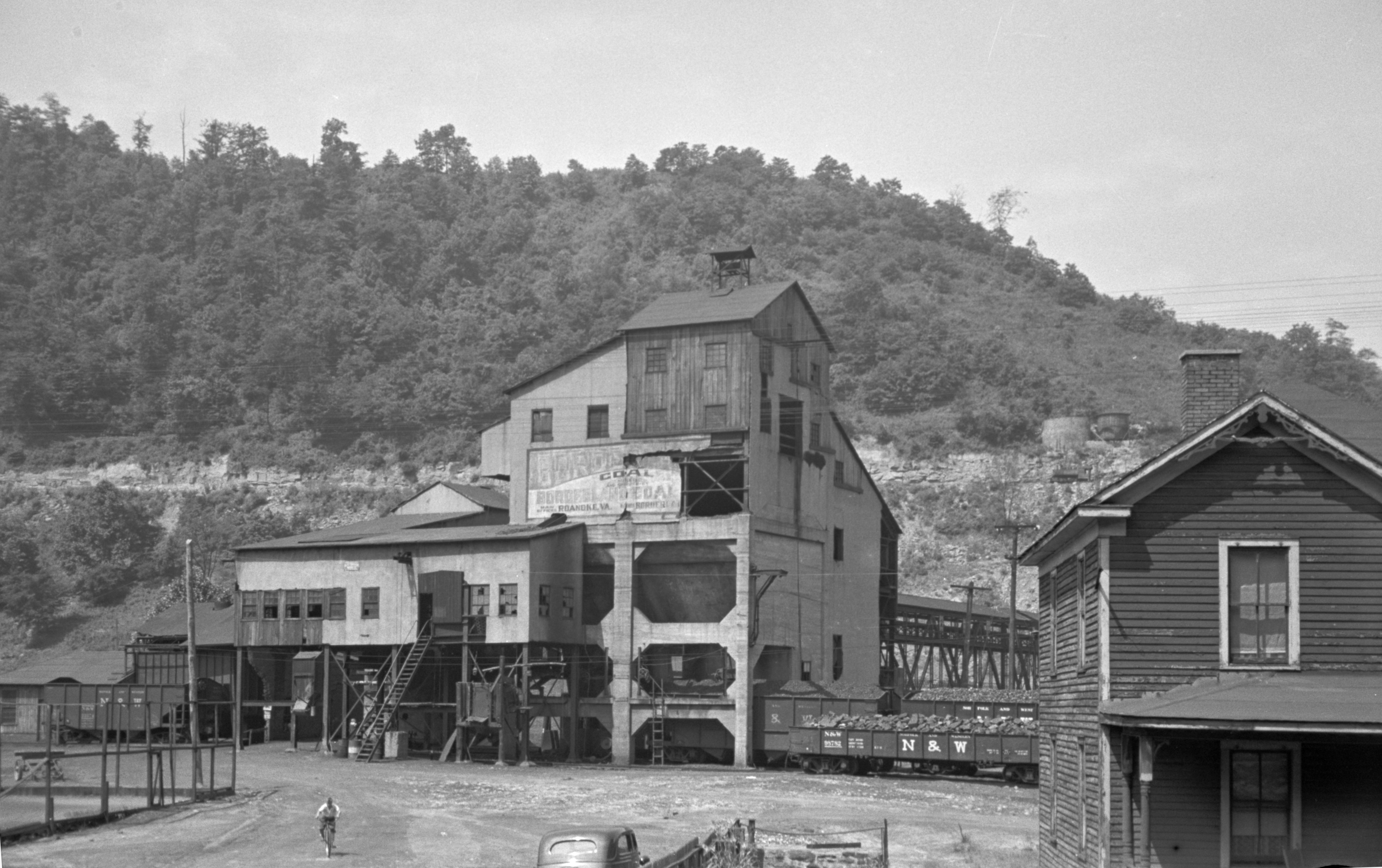
Coal mining has long been a major industry in Floyd County.

=== 2020 census ===
As of the 2020 census, the county had a population of 35,942. The median age was 42.8 years. 22.0% of residents were under the age of 18 and 18.6% of residents were 65 years of age or older. For every 100 females there were 95.7 males, and for every 100 females age 18 and over there were 92.0 males age 18 and over.

The racial makeup of the county was 96.9% White, 0.3% Black or African American, 0.1% American Indian and Alaska Native, 0.3% Asian, 0.0% Native Hawaiian and Pacific Islander, 0.2% from some other race, and 2.2% from two or more races. Hispanic or Latino residents of any race comprised 0.9% of the population.

21.8% of residents lived in urban areas, while 78.2% lived in rural areas.

There were 14,946 households in the county, of which 30.1% had children under the age of 18 living with them and 29.7% had a female householder with no spouse or partner present. About 29.6% of all households were made up of individuals and 12.9% had someone living alone who was 65 years of age or older.

There were 17,333 housing units, of which 13.8% were vacant. Among occupied housing units, 70.7% were owner-occupied and 29.3% were renter-occupied. The homeowner vacancy rate was 1.4% and the rental vacancy rate was 8.8%.

=== 2010 census ===
As of the census of 2010, there were 39,451 people living in the county. 98.2% were White, 0.7% Black or African American, 0.2% Asian, 0.1% Native American, 0.2% of some other race and 0.6% of two or more races. 0.6% were Hispanic or Latino (of any race).

=== 2000 census ===
As of the census of 2000, there were 42,441 people, 16,881 households, and 12,272 families living in the county. The population density was 108 per square mile (42/km^{2}). There were 18,551 housing units at an average density of 47 per square mile (18/km^{2}). The racial makeup of the county was 97.73% White, 1.29% Black or African American, 0.12% Native American, 0.24% Asian, 0.08% Pacific Islander, 0.12% from other races, and 0.42% from two or more races. 0.61% of the population were Hispanic or Latino of any race. The Kentucky Melungeons live primarily in Floyd and Magoffin counties. These families once lived in certain pockets or clusters within Floyd County, some continue to do this. However, most of these Melungeon families have now spread out or moved away, and so they cannot be defined by one valley, ridge, hollow, watershed, area, etc. However, some of their known historic residences were: The upper waters of both the Right and Left Forks of Beaver Creek, as well as its smaller streams, branches, and forks; extending into Knott County as well.

There were 16,881 households, out of which 33.00% had children under the age of 18 living with them, 56.50% were married couples living together, 12.30% had a female householder with no husband present, and 27.30% were non-families. 25.20% of all households were made up of individuals, and 10.20% had someone living alone who was 65 years of age or older. The average household size was 2.45 and the average family size was 2.93.

In the county, the population was spread out, with 23.60% under the age of 18, 9.40% from 18 to 24, 30.30% from 25 to 44, 24.50% from 45 to 64, and 12.20% who were 65 years of age or older. The median age was 37 years. For every 100 females there were 96.70 males. For every 100 females age 18 and over, there were 95.00 males.

The median income for a household in the county was $21,168, and the median income for a family was $25,717. Males had a median income of $30,242 versus $20,569 for females. The per capita income for the county was $12,442. About 26.90% of families and 30.30% of the population were below the poverty line, including 39.80% of those under age 18 and 20.50% of those age 65 or over.

== Education ==
The county's public schools are operated by the Floyd County School District.

== Economy ==
=== Coal companies in Floyd County ===
- Blackhawk Mining
- James River Coal Company
- Frasure Creek Mining

== Politics ==
United States presidential election results for Floyd County, Kentucky
| Year | Republican | | Democratic | | Third party(ies) | |
| Year | No. | % | No. | % | No. | % |
|---|---|---|---|---|---|---|
| 1912 | 961 | 31.74% | 1,553 | 51.29% | 514 | 16.97% |
| 1916 | 1,823 | 44.84% | 2,217 | 54.53% | 26 | 0.64% |
| 1920 | 2,825 | 43.68% | 3,597 | 55.61% | 46 | 0.71% |
| 1924 | 3,773 | 44.02% | 4,220 | 49.23% | 579 | 6.75% |
| 1928 | 5,109 | 47.17% | 5,721 | 52.83% | 0 | 0.00% |
| 1932 | 3,415 | 28.49% | 8,537 | 71.22% | 34 | 0.28% |
| 1936 | 3,375 | 29.77% | 7,962 | 70.23% | 0 | 0.00% |
| 1940 | 3,711 | 28.97% | 9,100 | 71.03% | 0 | 0.00% |
| 1944 | 3,197 | 29.26% | 7,729 | 70.74% | 0 | 0.00% |
| 1948 | 3,127 | 25.88% | 8,823 | 73.03% | 132 | 1.09% |
| 1952 | 4,238 | 32.13% | 8,940 | 67.78% | 11 | 0.08% |
| 1956 | 6,166 | 43.77% | 7,907 | 56.13% | 15 | 0.11% |
| 1960 | 5,010 | 33.66% | 9,876 | 66.34% | 0 | 0.00% |
| 1964 | 2,352 | 16.75% | 11,644 | 82.93% | 45 | 0.32% |
| 1968 | 3,550 | 27.22% | 8,333 | 63.89% | 1,160 | 8.89% |
| 1972 | 6,099 | 44.20% | 7,544 | 54.67% | 157 | 1.14% |
| 1976 | 3,108 | 23.31% | 10,151 | 76.13% | 74 | 0.56% |
| 1980 | 4,179 | 27.16% | 10,975 | 71.34% | 231 | 1.50% |
| 1984 | 5,218 | 33.57% | 10,259 | 66.00% | 66 | 0.42% |
| 1988 | 5,296 | 29.81% | 12,327 | 69.39% | 141 | 0.79% |
| 1992 | 3,540 | 18.96% | 13,351 | 71.50% | 1,783 | 9.55% |
| 1996 | 3,139 | 21.82% | 9,655 | 67.12% | 1,590 | 11.05% |
| 2000 | 5,068 | 32.92% | 10,088 | 65.53% | 238 | 1.55% |
| 2004 | 6,612 | 36.97% | 11,132 | 62.24% | 141 | 0.79% |
| 2008 | 7,741 | 49.43% | 7,530 | 48.09% | 388 | 2.48% |
| 2012 | 9,784 | 65.71% | 4,733 | 31.79% | 373 | 2.51% |
| 2016 | 11,993 | 72.51% | 4,015 | 24.27% | 532 | 3.22% |
| 2020 | 12,250 | 74.91% | 3,884 | 23.75% | 219 | 1.34% |
| 2024 | 12,326 | 78.64% | 3,061 | 19.53% | 286 | 1.82% |

Floyd County was historically a Democratic stronghold, voting Democratic in every election from 1852 until 2008. The county gave Bill Clinton over 65% in both 1992 and 1996 while George W. Bush never received more than 37% of the county's vote. Like the rest of the state outside of Jefferson County (Louisville) and Fayette County (Lexington), the county eventually shifted to the Republican Party, but became one of the last counties in Kentucky to make that transition.

In 2008, its votes went to the Republican Party's presidential candidate for the first time in the county's history, and in 2016 Donald Trump won 72.5% of its vote. The county has trended strongly Republican since 2004, shifting from a 25% margin for the Democrat that year, to a 59.2% margin for the Republican in 2024.

=== Elected officials ===
Elected officials as of January 3, 2025
| U.S. House | Hal Rogers (R) | KY 5 |
| Ky. Senate | Scott Madon (R) | 29 |
| Ky. House | Ashley Tackett Laferty (D) | 95 |

== Communities ==
=== Cities ===
- Allen
- Martin
- Prestonsburg (county seat)
- Wayland
- Wheelwright

=== Census-designated places ===
- Auxier
- Betsy Layne
- Dwale
- Maytown
- McDowell

=== Other unincorporated places ===
- Alphoretta
- Banner
- Beaver
- Blue Moon
- Blue River
- Bonanza
- Burton
- Bypro
- Cliff
- Dana
- David
- Dema (part)
- Drift
- Eastern
- Emma
- Estill
- Garrett
- Glo
- Grethel
- Halo
- Harold
- Hi Hat
- Hippo
- Hueysville
- Ivel
- Jacks Creek
- Jump Station
- Lackey
- Langley
- Ligon
- Melvin
- Midas
- Minnie
- Orkney
- Printer
- Pyramid
- Risner
- Stanville
- Teaberry
- Tram
- Warco
- Watergap
- Weeksbury
- Wonder
- Woods

== Notable residents ==
- Willie Edward Taylor Carver Jr. — educator and author, 2022 Kentucky Teacher of the Year
- Kelly Coleman — professional basketball player
- Bette Henritze — stage, film and TV actress
- Boyd Holbrook — actor and model
- Kenny Rice — sportscaster

== See also ==
- Big Sandy Area Development District
- East Kentucky Science Center
- Eula Hall
- James John Floyd
- Samuel May House
- Mountain Arts Center
- National Register of Historic Places listings in Floyd County, Kentucky
