= May House =

May House may refer to:

== Hong Kong ==
- May House, part of the Hong Kong Police Headquarters

== United States ==
- May-Stringer House, Brooksville, Florida, listed on the National Register of Historic Places (NRHP)
- Asa May House (Capps, Florida), listed on the NRHP
- Robert May House, Anchorage, Kentucky, listed on the NRHP in Anchorage, Kentucky
- David L. May House, Elizabethtown, Kentucky, listed on the NRHP in Hardin County, Kentucky
- Samuel May House, Prestonsburg, Kentucky, listed on the NRHP
- Sophie May House, Norridgewock, Maine, listed on the NRHP in Somerset County, Maine
- Meyer May House, Grand Rapids, Michigan, listed on the NRHP
- Dr. H. A. May House, Washington, Missouri, listed on the NRHP in Franklin County, Missouri
- Albert May House, Stevensville, Montana, listed on the NRHP
- Rundlet-May House, Portsmouth, New Hampshire, listed on the NRHP
- David and Mary May House, Cincinnati, Ohio, listed on the NRHP
- Asa May House (West Fairlee, Vermont), listed on the NRHP
- Eli May House, Fort Atkinson, Wisconsin, listed on the NRHP in Jefferson County, Wisconsin
