= Timeline of Kentucky history =

This is a timeline of Kentucky history.

== Early history ==
- Approximately 1718:Eskippakithiki established.
- Before 1750, Kentucky was populated nearly exclusively by Cherokee, Chickasaw, Shawnee and several other tribes of Native Americans See also Pre-Columbian
- April 13, 1750 • While leading an expedition for the Loyal Land Company in what is now southeastern Kentucky, Dr. Thomas Walker was the first recorded American of European descent to discover and use coal in Kentucky;
- By 1751 surveyor-explorer and Indian scout Christopher Gist, representing the Ohio Company, together with a bonded African, mapped the Ohio River area from its headwaters (near today's Pittsburgh) and crossed into what is now Kentucky.
- Approximately 1754-55:Eskippakithiki abandoned. Eskippakithiki is the last known Native American settlement in the state of Kentucky.

== Seven Years War / French and Indian War ==
- 1754 The Piqua, of the Shawnee nation, abandoned Eskippakithiki, "place of blue licks" - or Little Pict Town as the European traders called it. This may also have been the town that the Wyandot (of the Iroquois nations) referred to as Kentucky or "Meadow" and so the name for the nearby river came to serve as the name for the whole area. Eskppakithiki was probably the last permanent non-European town in the area that became Kentucky; later European-American settlers called the well-kept farmlands around the stockaded village location the "Indian Old Fields."
- 1767 Daniel Boone led his first band of hunters as far west as what is now Floyd County, Kentucky and hunted along the Big Sandy River.
- 1769 Judge Richard Henderson financed a venture proposed by John Finley to find the Cherokees' Warriors Path through a gap in the Cumberland Mountains; Finley convinced his friend Daniel Boone to lead a hunting party on a long hunt in Kentucky, including John Stewart, Boone's brother-in-law; they cleared a trail through the Cumberland Gap; on December 22, a Shawnee war party confiscated their store of pelts, warning them not to return, but Daniel Boone, his brother Squire and John Stewart remained in Kentucky for two more years, exploring and hunting - tales of these exploits drew the attention of easterners eager for new lands to settle.

== Lord Dunmore's War ==
- June 16, 1774 • James Harrod and 37 men, while on a surveying expedition ordered by Lord Dunmore, royal governor of Virginia, claimed the territory in what is now Mercer County, Kentucky as the first English settlement west of the Alleghenies, Harrod's Town; in July they abandoned the few buildings there when called into military service, but returned the next spring with women (like Ann Kennedy Wilson Poague Lindsay McGinty) to build up what became a bustling frontier town at Old Fort Hill.

== Revolutionary War ==
- March 10, 1775 • Daniel Boone along with 35 axmen begin to blaze a trail from Fort Chiswell through Cumberland Gap into central Kentucky. Financed by the Transylvania Company, the trail eventually came to be known as the Wilderness Road.
- June 1775 • Led by Major John Morrison, a small band of Virginia militia including Levi Todd and William McConnell camped at a spring near Elkhorn Creek. Upon hearing about the Battle of Lexington, a skirmish between the British and the Minutemen of Lexington, Massachusetts, the soldiers named their campsite Lexington in honor of the first military conflict in the American Revolution; McConnell built a cabin on the site (later called McConnell's Station); Lexington, Kentucky was one of the first permanent settlements by the English moving west into the frontier territory of what was then at the center of a colonial war between France, England and Spain.
- 1777 • Levi Todd moved to Kentucky and settled in Harrodsburg where he became the first clerk of Kentucky County in the Commonwealth of Virginia.
- May 27, 1778 *(1778) George Rogers Clark arrives at the Falls of the Ohio and establishes Corn Island settlement.
- 1779 • Lexington Station is established on the "Town Branch" of Elkhorn Creek; refurbished by Col. John Todd (Virginia soldier) in 1781 as a blockhouse fort; the town of Lexington was established in 1782.
- August 19, 1782 • The Battle of Blue Licks in what is now Robertson County, was the last major conflict of the American Revolutionary War; Col. John Todd, co-founder of the town of Lexington, is one of the dead.

== Between the wars ==
- October 1, 1789 • Jenny Brevard Wiley, mother of four children and pregnant with her fifth at the time, was kidnapped from her home in Virginia by a war party of Cherokees, Shawnees, Wyandots and Delawares; forced to work for her captors at Little Mud Lick Creek in Johnson County, Kentucky, she escaped and returned to her husband, eventually returning to live with her new family in the same area where she had been held as a slave. Jenny Wiley State Resort Park near Dewey Lake in eastern Kentucky and the Jenny Wiley Stakes thoroughbred race at Keeneland Race Course in Lexington, Kentucky are named after her.
- June 1, 1792 • Kentucky became the fifteenth state to be admitted to the union and Isaac Shelby, a military veteran from Virginia, was elected the first Governor of the Commonwealth of Kentucky.
- 1795 • Free Frank McWorter builds and manages a farming settlement in Pulaski County, Kentucky while enslaved by his father, George McWhorter; his saltpeter factory becomes highly profitable during the War of 1812 and by 1817 he had earned enough money of his own to purchase his wife Lucy from her master, and in 1819 bought his own freedom from his father, earning the moniker Free Frank; he traded his saltpeter plant in 1829 in exchange for the freedom of his eldest son Frank and moved with his family to Illinois, continuing to purchase the freedom of his relatives.
- December, 1811 through February, 1812 • A series of very large or great earthquakes strike the New Madrid Seismic Zone creating a "Hell on Earth" scenario for early Kentuckians, both native and European.
- 1818 • The portion of Kentucky west of the Tennessee River was purchased from the Chickasaw by U.S. President Andrew Jackson, hence the name of this region — The Jackson Purchase.
- May 27, 1830 • A veto by President Andrew Jackson prevented the federal funding of refurbishing of the Maysville Road from the Ohio River to Lexington since, according to Jackson, the bill only benefited the Commonwealth of Kentucky; this was a personal and political blow to Henry Clay and the Whig Party's American System.
- February 2, 1833 • Kentucky's legislature passed the Non-Importation Act was part of a national trend to strengthen the laws regarding slavery and the rising efforts for personal liberty, including the increased efforts within the Underground Railroad freedom movement in which the state of Kentucky focused as an important crossroads. The act was repealed in 1849 as part of the work in building the state's new constitution.
- January 1856 • Margaret Garner led seven members of her family out of slavery in Kentucky, walking across the frozen Ohio River from the Covington side to Cincinnati, Ohio; but they are pursued by federal marshals and Archibald K. Gaines who surround the cabin where they are hiding; she tried to kill her two children and herself rather than surrender but succeeds only in killing her daughter Mary before being captured; her story became widely known and was immortalized in Toni Morrison's 1987 novel Beloved.

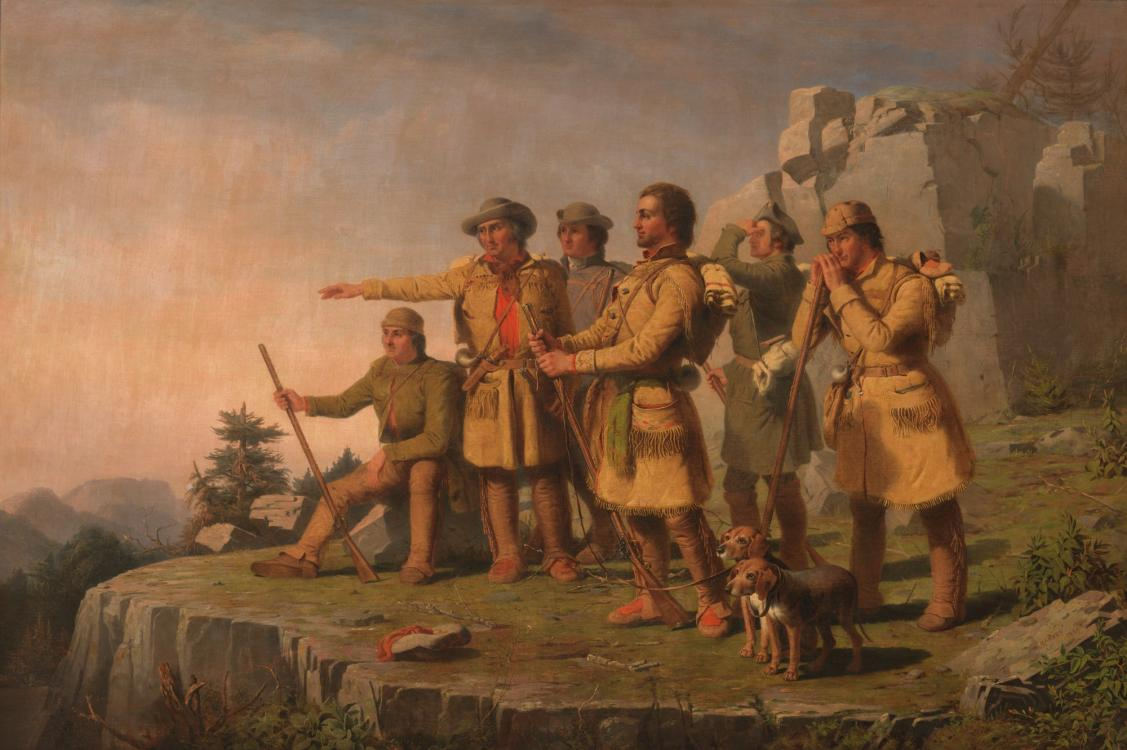
Boone's First View of Kentucky, William Tylee Ranney (1849)

== Civil War ==
See Timeline of Kentucky in the Civil War

== Post Civil War period ==
- January 31, 1865 • The Constitutional Amendment ending slavery in the U.S. is passed and enough states ratify it by December - Kentucky's legislature, not under federal "reconstruction," refused to ratify the Thirteenth Amendment until Kentucky woman legislator, Mae Street Kidd won this battle in 1976.
- May 17, 1875 • The first Kentucky Derby was won by a colt named Aristides ridden by African-American jockey, Oliver Lewis in front of an estimated crowd of 10,000 people.

== Twentieth century ==
- January 1937 • A massive flood occurs as the result of snowmelt and record rainfall affecting nearly every Kentucky town and city along the Ohio River, its tributaries and the Mississippi.

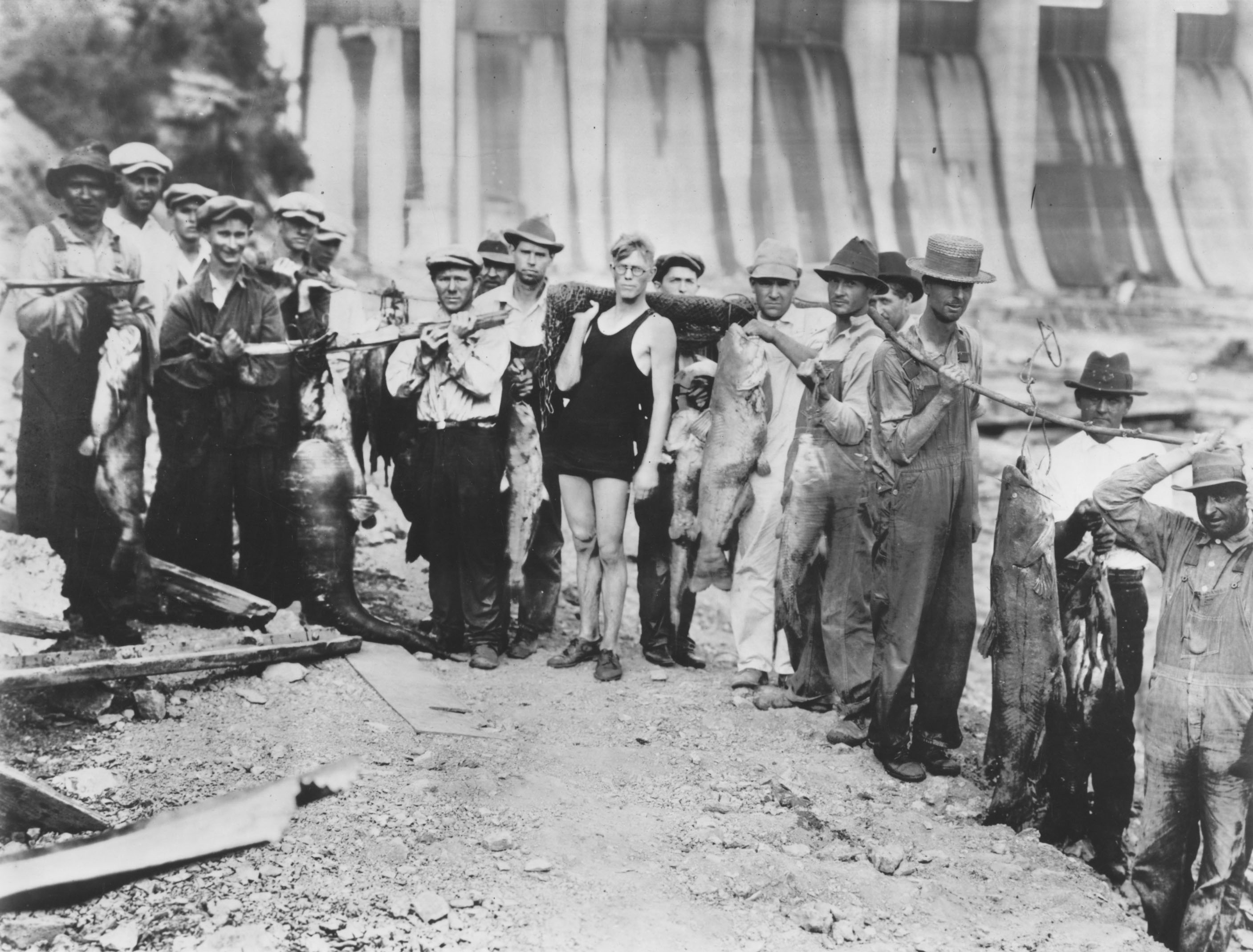
Tennessee River in 1940 (Dam Fish Catch)

- 1954 • A twelve-year-old then known as Cassius Clay approached a Louisville police officer named Joe Martin to report that his bicycle had been stolen. Martin, then the coach of Louisville's city boxing program, tells Cassius that instead of "whooping" the thief, he should learn to box. The next day, the boy takes his first boxing lessons, the first step on a journey that would take him to a legendary boxing career.
- February 28, 1958 • Prestonsburg bus disaster — A school bus traveling on US 23 in Floyd County collides with a wrecker truck and plunges into a flooded Levisa Fork River. The driver and 26 children drown in what remains the deadliest bus disaster in U.S. history.
- May 28, 1977 • Beverly Hills Supper Club fire — A fire at the Beverly Hills Supper Club, a nightclub in Southgate in Campbell County, kills 165 and injures over 200.
- May 14, 1988 • Carrollton bus collision — Larry Mahoney, intoxicated and driving the wrong way on Interstate 71 in Carroll County, hits a converted school bus carrying a youth group from First Assembly of God in Radcliff. The crash and the ensuing fire kill 27, which equals the toll from the Prestonsburg disaster 30 years earlier.
- December 1, 1997 • 1997 Heath High School shooting — Michael Carneal, an emotionally troubled freshman at Heath High School in McCracken County, opens fire on a group of his fellow students who were leaving a preschool prayer meeting. Three are killed and five wounded, with one of the wounded left a paraplegic. Carneal is eventually sentenced to three concurrent life sentences plus 120 years.

== Twenty-first century ==
- August 27, 2006 – Comair Flight 5191 crashes shortly after takeoff from Blue Grass Airport in Lexington. Of the 50 passengers and crew on board, 49 are killed.
- November 3, 2015 – In the gubernatorial election, Jenean Hampton is elected Lieutenant Governor on the ticket of Matt Bevin, becoming the first African American ever elected to statewide office.

== See also ==
- Outline of Kentucky
- History of Kentucky
- List of Kentucky state legislatures

Cities

- Timeline of Louisville, Kentucky
- Timeline of Lexington, Kentucky
- Timeline of Newport, Kentucky
