= National Register of Historic Places listings in Anchorage, Kentucky =

This is a list of properties and historic districts on the National Register of Historic Places in Anchorage, Kentucky. Latitude and longitude coordinates of the 35 sites listed on this page may be displayed in a map or exported in several formats by clicking on one of the links in the adjacent box.

National Register sites elsewhere in Jefferson County are listed separately.

This National Park Service list is complete through NPS recent listings posted July 11, 2025.

== Current listings ==
	Name on the Register	Image	Date listed	Location	Description
1	Anchorage Historic District	Anchorage Historic District	December 5, 1980 (#80001554)	Kentucky Route 146; 38°16′02″N 85°32′33″W	
2	The Anchorage	The Anchorage	December 5, 1980 (#80001555)	804 Evergreen Rd. 38°15′24″N 85°32′17″W	
3	Bayless House	Bayless House	December 5, 1980 (#80001556)	1116 Bellewood Rd. 38°15′45″N 85°32′48″W	
4	Bonavita-Weller House	Bonavita-Weller House	July 12, 1983 (#83002637)	12006 Ridge Rd. 38°15′42″N 85°31′54″W	
5	Bonnycot	Bonnycot	July 12, 1983 (#83002638)	1111 Bellewood Rd. 38°15′42″N 85°32′38″W	
6	Central Kentucky Lunatic Asylum	Central Kentucky Lunatic Asylum	July 12, 1983 (#83002646)	2201 Lakeland Rd. 38°16′41″N 85°33′18″W	
7	Citizens National Life Insurance Building	Citizens National Life Insurance Building	November 11, 1977 (#77000622)	11405 Park Rd. 38°16′00″N 85°32′30″W	
8	Coldeway House	Coldeway House	December 5, 1980 (#80001557)	12005 E. Osage Rd. 38°16′11″N 85°31′59″W	
9	James Courteney House	James Courteney House	December 5, 1980 (#80001558)	12006 Hazelwood Rd. 38°16′01″N 85°31′54″W	
10	Otto F. Eitel House	Otto F. Eitel House	December 10, 1998 (#98001488)	12004 La Grange Rd. 38°16′40″N 85°31′03″W	
11	Forrester House	Forrester House	April 9, 1984 (#84001559)	1103 Evergreen Rd. 38°15′40″N 85°32′12″W	
12	Garr House		July 12, 1983 (#83002669)	2100 Evergreen Rd. 38°16′30″N 85°32′44″W	
13	Richard Gwathmey House	Richard Gwathmey House	July 12, 1983 (#83002676)	1205 Elm Rd. 38°15′49″N 85°32′04″W	
14	Hannah House	Hannah House	December 5, 1980 (#80001559)	1306 Evergreen Rd. 38°15′53″N 85°32′23″W	
15	Hausgen House	Hausgen House	July 12, 1983 (#83002677)	1404 Walnut Lane; 38°15′58″N 85°32′49″W	
16	Hillcrest	Hillcrest	December 5, 1980 (#80001560)	11600 Owl Creek Rd. 38°15′38″N 85°32′28″W	
17	Hite-Foree Log House	Hite-Foree Log House	July 30, 1976 (#76000899)	12401 Lucas Lane; 38°16′42″N 85°31′28″W	
18	Jones Estate	Jones Estate	December 5, 1980 (#80001561)	1905 Stonegate Rd. 38°16′16″N 85°32′04″W	
19	John Marshall Sr. House	John Marshall Sr. House	December 5, 1980 (#80001562)	12106 Osage Rd. 38°16′11″N 85°31′44″W	
20	Robert May House	Robert May House	July 12, 1983 (#83002702)	11104 Owl Creek Lane; 38°15′46″N 85°32′54″W	
21	Nash–McDonald House	Nash–McDonald House	December 5, 1980 (#80001564)	1306 Bellewood Rd. 38°15′52″N 85°32′39″W	
22	Newland Log House	Newland Log House	July 12, 1983 (#83002713)	12007 Log Cabin Lane; 38°15′28″N 85°31′57″W	
23	Nock House	Nock House	December 5, 1980 (#80001565)	1401 Elm Rd. 38°15′54″N 85°32′04″W	
24	Presbyterian Manse	Presbyterian Manse	July 12, 1983 (#83002724)	1302 Bellewood Rd. 38°15′51″N 85°32′41″W	
25	Railway Depot	Railway Depot	December 5, 1980 (#80001566)	1500 Evergreen Rd. 38°15′56″N 85°32′25″W	
26	St. Lukes Church	St. Lukes Church	December 5, 1980 (#80001569)	1204 Maple Lane; 38°15′46″N 85°32′25″W	
27	Shallcross	Shallcross	December 5, 1980 (#80001567)	11804 Ridge Rd. 38°15′43″N 85°32′06″W	
28	Sherley Mansion		July 12, 1983 (#83002732)	2018 Homewood Dr. 38°16′36″N 85°32′10″W	
29	Simrall-Warfield House	Simrall-Warfield House	December 5, 1980 (#80001568)	1509 Cold Spring Rd. 38°16′04″N 85°31′42″W	
30	James Thompson House	James Thompson House	December 5, 1980 (#80001570)	1400 Walnut Lane; 38°15′54″N 85°32′49″W	
31	Twin Gates Carriage House		July 14, 1983 (#83002743)	11801 Osage Rd. 38°16′09″N 85°32′11″W	
32	James Walker House	James Walker House	July 12, 1983 (#83002745)	1902 Evergreen Rd. 38°16′19″N 85°32′35″W	
33	John Webb House	John Webb House	December 5, 1980 (#80001571)	12200 Lucas Lane; 38°16′36″N 85°31′41″W	
34	Eustace Williams House	Eustace Williams House	July 12, 1983 (#83002750)	11705 Owl Creek Lane; 38°15′43″N 85°32′17″W	
35	Dr. Winston's House	Dr. Winston's House	December 5, 1980 (#80001572)	11906 Ridge Rd. 38°15′42″N 85°32′02″W	

== Former listing ==
	Name on the Register	Image	Date listed	Date removed	Location	Description
1	Dorsey-O'Bannon'Hebel House		September 25, 1979 (#79000996)	February 5, 1991	East of Anchorage at 13204 Factory Lane	Moved in 1987

== See also ==
- National Register of Historic Places listings in Jefferson County, Kentucky
- List of National Historic Landmarks in Kentucky
- List of attractions and events in the Louisville metropolitan area
