= National Register of Historic Places listings in Floyd County, Kentucky =

Location of Floyd County in Kentucky

This is a list of the National Register of Historic Places listings in Floyd County, Kentucky.

This is intended to be a complete list of the properties and districts on the National Register of Historic Places in Floyd County, Kentucky, United States. The locations of National Register properties and districts for which the latitude and longitude coordinates are included below, may be seen in a map.

There are 16 properties and districts listed on the National Register in the county; 1 of these is a National Historic Landmark. Another property was once listed but has been removed.

This National Park Service list is complete through NPS recent listings posted August 28, 2026.

== Current listings ==
	Name on the Register	Image	Date listed	Location	City or town	Description
1	G.D. Callihan House	G.D. Callihan House	May 18, 1989 (#89000389)	105 W. Graham St. 37°39′54″N 82°46′22″W	Prestonsburg	
2	B.F. Combs House	B.F. Combs House	May 18, 1989 (#89000390)	41 N. Arnold Ave. 37°40′08″N 82°46′30″W	Prestonsburg	
3	Fitzpatrick-Harmon House		May 18, 1989 (#89000388)	102 E. Court St. 37°40′07″N 82°46′20″W	Prestonsburg	Old house with a Colonial Revival-style portico added in the 1950s.
4	Front Street Historic District	Front Street Historic District	May 18, 1989 (#89000398)	Roughly Front St. between W. Court St. and Ford St. 37°40′00″N 82°46′31″W	Prestonsburg	
5	Harkins Law Office Building	Harkins Law Office Building	May 18, 1989 (#89000395)	1 S. Arnold Ave. 37°40′03″N 82°46′26″W	Prestonsburg	
6	Joseph D. Harkins House	Joseph D. Harkins House	May 18, 1989 (#89000394)	204 N. Arnold Ave. 37°40′16″N 82°46′38″W	Prestonsburg	
7	Samuel May House	Samuel May House	April 1, 1980 (#80001526)	690 N. Lake Dr. 37°41′00″N 82°46′42″W	Prestonsburg	
8	May-Fitzpatrick House	May-Fitzpatrick House	May 18, 1989 (#89000392)	39 S. Arnold Ave. 37°40′00″N 82°46′23″W	Prestonsburg	
9	May-Latta House	May-Latta House	May 18, 1989 (#89000393)	33 N. Arnold Ave. 37°40′06″N 82°46′29″W	Prestonsburg	
10	Methodist Episcopal Church, South	Methodist Episcopal Church, South	May 18, 1989 (#89000391)	S. Arnold Ave. between Ford St. and W. Graham St. 37°39′57″N 82°46′23″W	Prestonsburg	Part of the Methodist Episcopal Church, South
11	Middle Creek Battlefield	Middle Creek Battlefield	March 26, 1992 (#91001665)	3 miles west of Prestonsburg at the junction of Kentucky Routes 114 and 404; 37°39′02″N 82°48′50″W	Prestonsburg	
12	Spruce Pine Elementary School		August 31, 2026 (#100013338)	5906 State Highway 2030; 37°30′54″N 82°40′38″W	Banner vicinity	
13	Town Branch Bridge	Town Branch Bridge	May 18, 1989 (#89000396)	County Road 1334 over Levisa Fork; 37°39′51″N 82°46′24″W	Prestonsburg	Demolished
14	US Post Office-Prestonsburg	US Post Office-Prestonsburg	May 18, 1989 (#89000417)	Central Ave. and E. Court St. 37°40′06″N 82°46′20″W	Prestonsburg	
15	West Prestonsburg Bridge	West Prestonsburg Bridge	May 18, 1989 (#89000397)	Over Levisa Fork between Prestonsburg and West Prestonsburg; 37°40′21″N 82°46′43″W	Prestonsburg	
16	Wheelwright Commercial District	Wheelwright Commercial District	November 19, 1980 (#80001527)	Main St. 37°19′58″N 82°43′15″W	Wheelwright	

== Former listing ==
	Name on the Register	Image	Date listed	Date removed	Location	City or town	Description
1	Garfield Place		December 4, 1974 (#74000871)	February 3, 1988	2nd Ave.	Prestonsburg	aka Garfield Headquarters, John M. Burns House

== See also ==
- List of National Historic Landmarks in Kentucky
- National Register of Historic Places listings in Kentucky
