= Jenny Wiley =

American pioneer (1760–1831)

- Born: Jean Sellards; 1760
- Died: 1831 (aged 70–71)
- Resting place: Near the farm in River, Kentucky where she spent her final years
- Known for: Being taken captive by Native Americans in 1789 for eleven months.

Jenny Wiley, born Jean "Jenny" Sellards (1760–1831), in British Colonial America, was a pioneer woman who was taken captive by Native Americans in 1789, where she witnessed the death of her brother and children. She escaped after 11 months of captivity. Jenny Wiley State Resort Park in Prestonsburg, Kentucky is named in her honor.

== Early life ==
Jenny Wiley was born to Hezekiah Sellards and mother Jean Brevard Sellards. Her family moved to Walkers Creek area, in what is now Bland County, Virginia. In 1778, Jenny met and married Thomas Wiley, a Scots/Irish immigrant in 1779, near Walker's Station.

Soon after, they built a cabin in which to live to raise a family.

== Capture ==
On October 1, 1789, Thomas set out for a trading post with a horse heavy laden with ginseng to barter for domestic necessaries. That afternoon, Jenny's brother-in-law, John Borders, heard owl-call signals in the woods that made him suspect Native Americans were in the area and planning an attack. He warned his sister-in-law to take her children and leave the cabin, but Jenny first wanted to finish some household chores.

A group of eleven Native Americans, composed of two Cherokees, three Shawnees, three Wyandots, and three Delawares, stormed the cabin. Jenny and her brother heard the attackers coming and tried to barricade the door, and also attempted to fight them off. They killed her younger brother of about fifteen years of age and three of her children; they initially spared her youngest child of about fifteen months. Jenny, who was expecting her fifth child, and the surviving child, were then taken captive. There was some dispute amongst her captors about whether to kill her and her baby as they were slowing down the party, but they kept her and her baby alive until the baby became ill. The captors killed the child while Jenny slept. She gave birth shortly thereafter, but that child was also murdered, by scalping. The test was to put the baby on a piece of wood and send it down the river; if it cried, they would scalp it. If it did not cry, it would be allowed to live.

== Escape ==
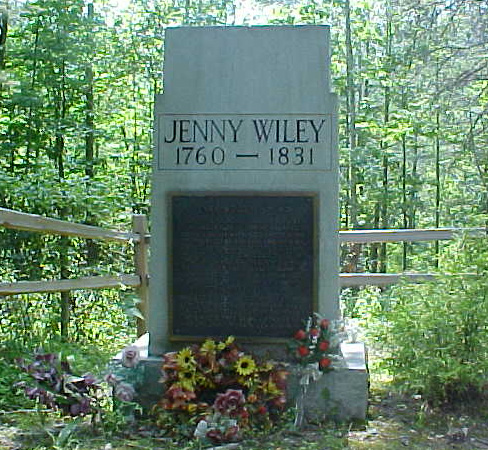
Gravesite of Jenny Wiley

Jenny was held captive by the Native Americans for several months in what is now Little Mud Lick Creek, Johnson County, Kentucky. She escaped with help from Mathias Harman, and helped into Floyd County (now Johnson County). She was then aided in crossing a major river by longhunter Henry Skaggs. With the help of the settlers at Harman's Blockhouse, Jenny made her way back to Walker's Creek and was reunited with her husband, Thomas.

The Native American bands had raided settlements in this area and killed many settlers. Outrage among settlers caused many men to volunteer, along with militia units, to rid the area of these raiding parties.

In approximately 1800, the Wiley family crossed the Big Sandy River, and settled in what is currently Johnson County, Kentucky. Jenny and her husband Thomas started a new family and had five children consisting of the following:

- Jane Wiley, married Richard Williamson, son of American Revolutionary War patriot at the Battle of Point Pleasant also settled on Twelve Pole Creek
- Sarah "Sally" Wiley, married twice (1) Christian Yost; (2) Samuel Murray and resided in Wayne County
- Hezekiah Wiley, married Christine Nelson and settled on Twelve Pole Creek, Wayne County, (West) Virginia
- Adam Brevard Wiley married Sally Stapleton,
- William Wiley married Nellie Dillon

Jenny Wiley lived in Johnson County with her family until her death in 1831. She was buried near the farm in River where she spent her final years.

== State Park ==
Jenny Wiley State Resort Park was established in her honor just northeast of Prestonsburg near highway Route 23. The park is centered around 1,100-acre (4.5 km^{2}) Dewey Lake, and includes the Jenny Wiley Theatre.

== Jenny's horse race ==
Wiley is also honored by a Thoroughbred horse race named in her honor and run each year at Keeneland Race Course in Lexington, Kentucky. An event for fillies and mares, the race is called the Jenny Wiley Stakes and attracts some of the best female horses in American horse racing.
