= Front Street Historic District =

Front Street Historic District may refer to:
(sorted by state, then city/town)

- Front Street (River Park Drive) Historic District, Guttenberg, Iowa, listed on the National Register of Historic Places (NRHP) in Clayton County, Iowa
- Front Street District, Greenup, Kentucky, listed on the NRHP in Greenup County, Kentucky
- Front Street Historic District (Prestonsburg, Kentucky), listed on the NRHP in Floyd County, Kentucky
- Front Street Historic District (Weymouth, Massachusetts), listed on the NRHP in Norfolk County, Massachusetts
- North Front Street Commercial District, Mankato, Minnesota, listed on the NRHP in Blue Earth County, Minnesota
- Front Street Historic District (Pascagoula, Mississippi), listed on the NRHP in Jackson County, Mississippi
- Front Street Historic District (Exeter, New Hampshire), listed on the NRHP in Rockingham County, New Hampshire
- Front Street-Parade Hill-Lower Warren Street Historic District, Hudson, NY, superseded on the NRHP by the Hudson Historic District
- South Front Street Historic District, Philadelphia, PA, listed on the NRHP in Philadelphia, Pennsylvania
