= First United Methodist Church (Prestonburg, Kentucky) =

Historic church in Kentucky, United States

- Methodist Episcopal Church, South
- U.S. National Register of Historic Places
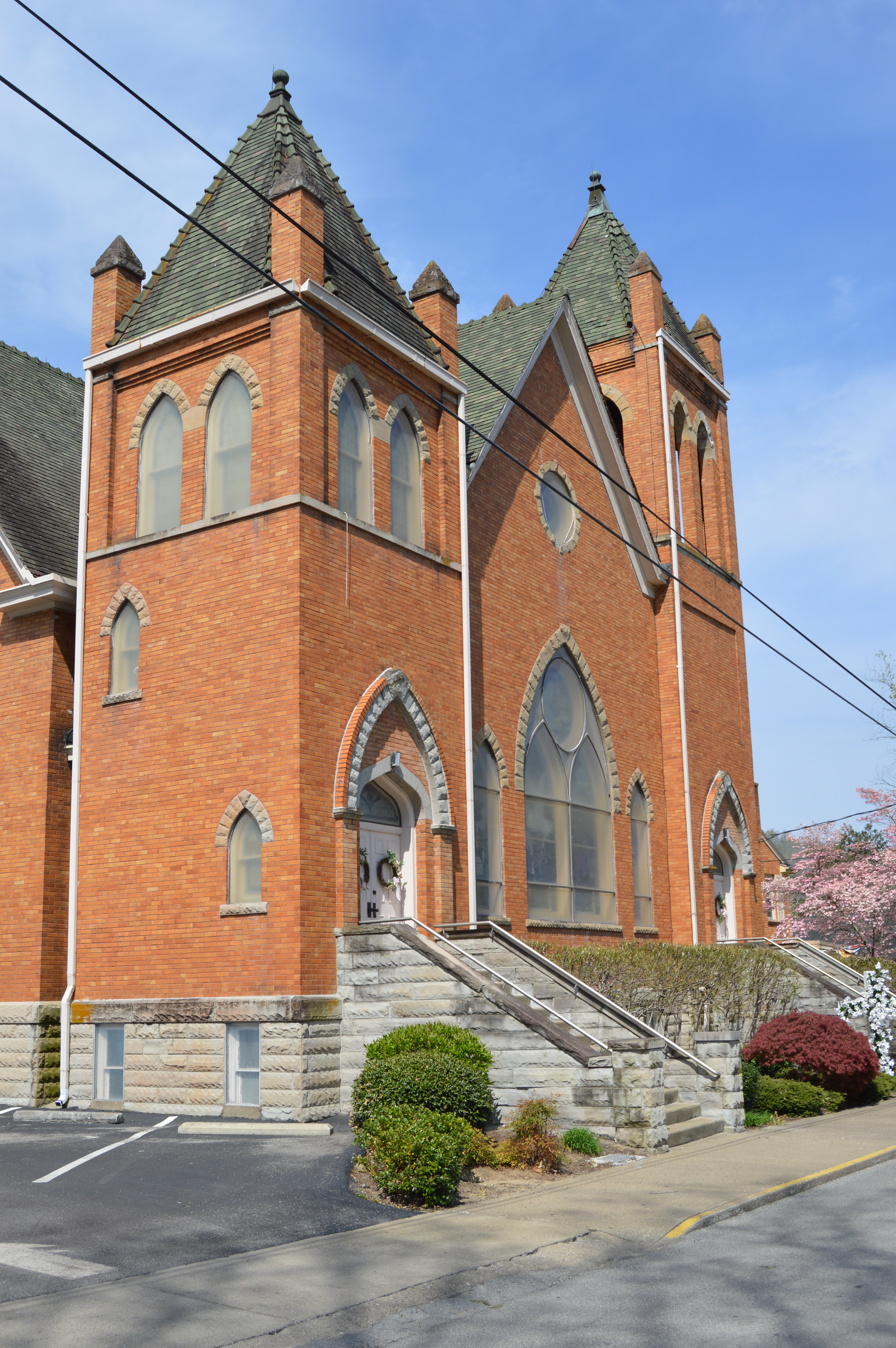
- Front of the church

- Location within Kentucky Location within the United States
- Location: S. Arnold Ave. between Ford St. and W. Graham St., Prestonsburg, Kentucky
- Coordinates: 37°39′56″N 82°46′24″W
- Area: less than one acre
- Built: 1917
- Architectural style: Late Gothic Revival
- MPS: Prestonsburg MPS
- NRHP reference No.: 89000391
- Added to NRHP: May 18, 1989

The First United Methodist Church in Prestonburg, Kentucky is a historic church.

It was listed on the National Register of Historic Places as Methodist Episcopal Church, South in 1989. It is a historic Methodist church building on S. Arnold Avenue between Ford Street and W. Graham Street in Prestonsburg, Kentucky.

It was built in 1917 in a Late Gothic Revival style. It is a brick building with yellow sandstone trim on a raised concrete block foundation. The brick is glazed with a yellow-orange mottled finish and is laid in running bond.

== See also ==
- National Register of Historic Places listings in Floyd County, Kentucky
