= Presbyterian Manse =

Presbyterian Manse may refer to:

- Presbyterian Manse (Anchorage, Kentucky)
- Presbyterian Manse (Natchez, Mississippi)
- Presbyterian Parsonage (Westerville, Ohio)
- Presbyterian Manse (Edisto Island, South Carolina)
- Presbyterian Manse (Jefferson, Texas)

== See also ==
- List of Presbyterian churches
- Presbyterian Church (disambiguation)
