= Mountain Arts Center =

Theater and performing arts center in Prestonsburg, Kentucky

- Interactive map of Mountain Arts Center
- Location: 50 Hal Rogers Drive; Prestonsburg, Kentucky, U.S.
- Coordinates: 37°39′23″N 82°47′35″W
- Seating type: Reserved
- Capacity: 1,054
- Type: Performing arts center

Construction
- Opened: October 1996

Website
- Venue website

The Mountain Arts Center is a performing arts venue located at 50 Hal Rogers Drive in Prestonsburg, Kentucky. The center was established in October 1996 and became home to the Kentucky Opry. Its main feature is the 1,054 seat theater, along with several large meeting rooms, a recording studio, an arts education room, individual instruction halls, and an art gallery featuring exhibits from many local artists. The theater is also home to the Dance Etc. school of dance annual performances of The Nutcracker and Spring Recitals.

Major musicians and bands to have used the center's stage in the past include: Dwight Yoakam, Loretta Lynn, George Jones, Montgomery Gentry, Ricky Skaggs, Patty Loveless, Ralph Stanley, IIIrd Tyme Out, Merle Haggard, The Temptations, Percy Sledge, The Platters, The Drifters, The Kingsmen, The Bishops, John Hagee, Dottie Rambo, Government Mule, Railroad Earth, and Steve Green.

== See also ==
- Jenny Wiley Theatre
- Paramount Arts Center
