= William B. Wood (builder) =

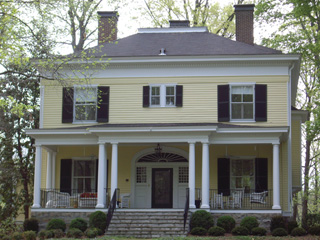
Hausgen House

William B. Wood was a building contractor in Kentucky, active in the 1890s.

A number of his works are listed on the National Register of Historic Places.

- Hausgen House, 1404 Walnut Lane Anchorage, KY (Wood William B.), NRHP-listed
- Hillcrest, 11600 Owl Creek Rd. Anchorage, KY (Wood, William B.), NRHP-listed

- John Marshall Sr. House, 12106 Osage Rd. Anchorage, KY (Wood, William B.), NRHP-listed
- Middletown United Methodist Church, Madison and Main Sts. Middletown, KY (Wood, William, B.), NRHP-listed
- Shallcross, 11804 Ridge Rd. Anchorage, KY (Wood, William B.), NRHP-listed
- James Thompson House, 1400 Walmut Land Anchorage, KY (Wood, William B.), NRHP-listed
- Dr. Winston's House, 11906 Ridge Rd. Anchorage, KY (Wood, William B.), NRHP-listed
