= East Kentucky Science Center =

- Location within Kentucky Location within the United States
- Established: March 2004
- Location: 7 Bert T. Combs Drive, Prestonsburg, Kentucky 41653
- Coordinates: 37.686°N 82.781°W
- Type: Science center, planetarium
- Website: bigsandy.kctcs.edu/EKSC

The East Kentucky Science Center was once a private, non-profit science center and planetarium located on the main campus of Big Sandy Community and Technical College in Prestonsburg, Kentucky. As of 2008, the EKSC became part of Big Sandy Community and Technical College, which now funds and operates the Science Center.. The center features a planetarium, exhibit hall with traveling exhibits, science classrooms, and gift shop.

== History ==
Low test scores in both mathematics and science captured the attention of educators and local residents in 1994. A coalition was formed that focused on promoting and implementing science education into the region. At one of the first meetings, John Rosenburg proposed an ambitious plan: to build a science center and planetarium similar to the one in Gastonia, North Carolina, his hometown. Rosenburg had already created the proposal for the East Kentucky Center for Science, Mathematics and Technology, which gained support of State Representative Greg Stumbo.

After outreach education operations in 1997 proved that the majority of population within the region had difficulty in understanding mathematics and science, the organization began developing hands-on programs that would help overcome these issues. In 1998, the Kentucky General Assembly appropriated $1.6 million for the construction of the building and another $1 million for the centers equipment. The awarded funds were based on figures provided by a consulting architect working under the assumption that costs were significantly lower than those required for a project built on the campus of a community college. The centers board of directors noticed this mistake and was forced to downsize the building plan. The new revised plans called for a 12,000 sq ft (1,100 m^{2}) facility, with an 85-seat, 40 ft (12 m). planetarium, 3,000 sq ft (280 m^{2}). exhibit area, 1,000 sq ft (93 m^{2}). science classroom, gift shop and offices. In 2000, the organization received an additional $1 million for the construction of the building. Groundbreaking ceremonies were held on November 9, 2001, and construction began in September 2002. Finally in March 2004, the East Kentucky Center for Science, Mathematics and Technology, which was shortened to the Eastern Kentucky Science Center, opened to the public.

As of July 1, 2008, the East Kentucky Science Center became part of Big Sandy Community and Technical College which is part of the Kentucky Community and Technical College System.

During the Fall of 2011, The East Kentucky Science Center and Planetarium made a $200,000.00 upgrade to the Planetarium. A Spitz SciDome HD Full Dome projection system was installed to complement the GOTO Chronos Star Machine and the SkyLase Laser system. In 2018 a SkyLase Manual Laser controller was installed to do live laser, and in 2019, a new Chroma Cove LED lighting system was installed. These upgrades greatly enhanced the programs and made the Planetarium one of the most technologically advanced Planetariums in the country.

It is also known as the East Kentucky Science Center and Planetarium, and the East Kentucky Science Center and Varia Planetarium.
