= List of Kentucky General Assemblies =

List of Kentucky state legislatures

The following is a list of legislative terms of the Kentucky General Assembly, the law-making branch of government of the U.S. state of Kentucky. Kentucky became part of the United States on June 1, 1792.

== Legislatures ==
=== Regular sessions ===
| Name | Start date | End date | Last election |
|---|---|---|---|
Kentucky Constitution of 1792
| ? | | | |
Kentucky Constitution of 1799
| ? | | | |
Kentucky Constitution of 1850
| 1850-51 Kentucky General Assembly | November 4, 1850 | March 24, 1851 | August 1850 |
| 1851-52 Kentucky General Assembly | November 3, 1851 | January 9, 1852 | August 1851 |
| 1853-54 Kentucky General Assembly | December 31, 1853 | March 10, 1854 | August 1853 |
| 1855-56 Kentucky General Assembly | December 31, 1855 | March 10, 1856 | August 1855 |
| 1857-58 Kentucky General Assembly | December 7, 1857 | February 17, 1858 | August 1857 |
| 1859-60 Kentucky General Assembly | December 5, 1859 | March 5, 1860 | August 1859 |
| 1861-63 Kentucky General Assembly: Regular Session; Adjourned Session; Adjourned Session; Adjourned Session | September 2, 1861 | October 4, 1861 | August 1861 |
| 1861-63 Kentucky General Assembly: Regular Session; Adjourned Session; Adjourned Session; Adjourned Session | November 27, 1861 | December 23, 1861 | August 1861 |
| 1861-63 Kentucky General Assembly: Regular Session; Adjourned Session; Adjourned Session; Adjourned Session | February 12, 1862 | March 17, 1862 | August 1861 |
| 1861-63 Kentucky General Assembly: Regular Session; Adjourned Session; Adjourned Session; Adjourned Session | January 8, 1863 | March 3, 1863 | August 1861 |
| 1863-65 Kentucky General Assembly: Regular Session; Adjourned Session | December 7, 1863 | February 22, 1864 | August 1863 |
| 1863-65 Kentucky General Assembly: Regular Session; Adjourned Session | January 4, 1865 | June 5, 1865 | August 1863 |
| 1865-67 Kentucky General Assembly: Regular Session; Adjourned Session | December 4, 1865 | February 19, 1866 | August 1865 |
| 1865-67 Kentucky General Assembly: Regular Session; Adjourned Session | January 3, 1867 | March 11, 1867 | August 1865 |
| 1867-69 Kentucky General Assembly: Regular Session; Adjourned Session | December 2, 1867 | March 10, 1868 | August 1867 |
| 1867-69 Kentucky General Assembly: Regular Session; Adjourned Session | January 5, 1869 | March 16, 1869 | August 1867 |
| 1869-71 Kentucky General Assembly: Regular Session; Adjourned Session | December 6, 1869 | March 22, 1870 | August 1869 |
| 1869-71 Kentucky General Assembly: Regular Session; Adjourned Session | January 4, 1871 | March 23, 1871 | August 1869 |
| 1871-73 Kentucky General Assembly: Regular Session; Adjourned Session | December 4, 1871 | March 29, 1872 | August 1871 |
| 1871-73 Kentucky General Assembly: Regular Session; Adjourned Session | January 7, 1873 | April 24, 1873 | August 1871 |
| 1873-74 Kentucky General Assembly | December 1, 1873 | February 23, 1874 | August 1873 |
| 1875-76 Kentucky General Assembly | December 31, 1875 | March 20, 1876 | August 1875 |
| 1877-78 Kentucky General Assembly | December 31, 1877 | April 10, 1878 | August 1877 |
| 1879-80 Kentucky General Assembly | December 31, 1879 | May 6, 1880 | August 1879 |
| 1881-82 Kentucky General Assembly | November 28, 1881 | April 24, 1882 | August 1881 |
| 1883-84 Kentucky General Assembly | December 31, 1883 | May 12, 1884 | August 1883 |
| 1885-86 Kentucky General Assembly | December 30, 1885 | May 18, 1886 | August 1885 |
| 1887-88 Kentucky General Assembly | December 30, 1887 | May 4, 1888 | August 1887 |
| 1889-90 Kentucky General Assembly | December 30, 1889 | May 27, 1890 | August 1889 |
Kentucky Constitution of 1891
| 1891-93 Kentucky General Assembly: Regular Session; Adjourned Session | December 30, 1891 | August 16, 1892 | August 1891 |
| 1891-93 Kentucky General Assembly: Regular Session; Adjourned Session | November 15, 1892 | July 3, 1893 | August 1891 |
| 1894 Kentucky General Assembly | January 2, 1894 | March 13, 1894 | November 1893 |
| 1896 Kentucky General Assembly | January 7, 1896 | March 17, 1896 | November 1895 |
| 1898 Kentucky General Assembly | January 4, 1898 | March 15, 1898 | November 1897 |
| 1900 Kentucky General Assembly | January 2, 1900 | March 13, 1900 | November 1899 |
| 1902 Kentucky General Assembly | January 7, 1902 | March 18, 1902 | November 1901 |
| 1904 Kentucky General Assembly | January 5, 1904 | March 15, 1904 | November 1903 |
| 1906 Kentucky General Assembly | January 2, 1906 | March 13, 1906 | November 1905 |
| 1908 Kentucky General Assembly | January 7, 1908 | March 17, 1908 | November 1907 |
| 1910 Kentucky General Assembly | January 4, 1910 | March 15, 1910 | November 1909 |
| 1912 Kentucky General Assembly | January 2, 1912 | March 12, 1912 | November 1911 |
| 1914 Kentucky General Assembly | January 6, 1914 | March 17, 1914 | November 1913 |
| 1916 Kentucky General Assembly | January 4, 1916 | March 14, 1916 | November 1915 |
| 1918 Kentucky General Assembly | January 8, 1918 | March 20, 1918 | November 1917 |
| 1920 Kentucky General Assembly | January 6, 1920 | March 17, 1920 | November 1919 |
| 1922 Kentucky General Assembly | January 3, 1922 | March 15, 1922 | November 1921 |
| 1924 Kentucky General Assembly | January 8, 1924 | March 19, 1924 | November 1923 |
| 1926 Kentucky General Assembly | January 5, 1926 | March 17, 1926 | November 1925 |
| 1928 Kentucky General Assembly | January 3, 1928 | March 16, 1928 | November 1927 |
| 1930 Kentucky General Assembly | January 7, 1930 | March 20, 1930 | November 1929 |
| 1932 Kentucky General Assembly | January 5, 1932 | March 17, 1932 | November 1931 |
| 1934 Kentucky General Assembly | January 2, 1934 | March 15, 1934 | November 1933 |
| 1936 Kentucky General Assembly | January 7, 1936 | February 15, 1936 | November 1935 |
| 1938 Kentucky General Assembly | January 4, 1938 | March 1, 1938 | November 1937 |
| 1940 Kentucky General Assembly | January 2, 1940 | March 14, 1940 | November 1939 |
| 1942 Kentucky General Assembly | January 6, 1942 | March 3, 1942 | November 1941 |
| 1944 Kentucky General Assembly | January 4, 1944 | March 15, 1944 | November 1943 |
| 1946 Kentucky General Assembly | January 8, 1946 | March 21, 1946 | November 1945 |
| 1948 Kentucky General Assembly | January 6, 1948 | March 19, 1948 | November 1947 |
| 1950 Kentucky General Assembly | January 3, 1950 | March 17, 1950 | November 1949 |
| 1952 Kentucky General Assembly | January 8, 1952 | March 21, 1952 | November 1951 |
| 1954 Kentucky General Assembly | January 5, 1954 | March 19, 1954 | November 1953 |
| 1956 Kentucky General Assembly | January 3, 1956 | February 18, 1956 | November 1955 |
| 1958 Kentucky General Assembly | January 7, 1958 | March 21, 1958 | November 1957 |
| 1960 Kentucky General Assembly | January 5, 1960 | March 18, 1960 | November 1959 |
| 1962 Kentucky General Assembly | January 2, 1962 | March 16, 1962 | November 1961 |
| 1964 Kentucky General Assembly | January 7, 1964 | March 20, 1964 | November 1963 |
| 1966 Kentucky General Assembly | January 4, 1966 | March 18, 1966 | November 1965 |
| 1968 Kentucky General Assembly | January 2, 1968 | March 15, 1968 | November 1967 |
| 1970 Kentucky General Assembly | January 6, 1970 | March 20, 1970 | November 1969 |
| 1972 Kentucky General Assembly | 1972 | | November 1971 |
| 1974 Kentucky General Assembly | 1974 | | November 1973 |
| 1976 Kentucky General Assembly | 1976 | | November 1975 |
| 1978 Kentucky General Assembly | 1978 | | November 1977 |
| 1980 Kentucky General Assembly | 1980 | | November 1979 |
| 1982 Kentucky General Assembly | 1982 | | November 1981 |
| 1984 Kentucky General Assembly: Organizational Session; Regular Session | January 4, 1983 | January 6, 1983 | November 1981 (House); November 1983 (Senate) (Note: The organizational session was held prior to the November 1983 Senate elections.) |
| 1984 Kentucky General Assembly: Organizational Session; Regular Session | January 3, 1984 | April 13, 1984 | November 1981 (House); November 1983 (Senate) |
| 1986 Kentucky General Assembly: Organizational Session; Regular Session | January 8, 1985 | January 11, 1985 | November 1984 (House); November 1983 (Senate) |
| 1986 Kentucky General Assembly: Organizational Session; Regular Session | January 7, 1986 | April 15, 1986 | November 1984 (House); November 1983 (Senate) |
| 1988 Kentucky General Assembly: Organizational Session; Regular Session | January 6, 1987 | January 8, 1987 | November 1986 |
| 1988 Kentucky General Assembly: Organizational Session; Regular Session | January 5, 1988 | April 15, 1988 | November 1986 |
| 1990 Kentucky General Assembly: Organizational Session; Regular Session | January 3, 1989 | January 6, 1989 | November 1988 |
| 1990 Kentucky General Assembly: Organizational Session; Regular Session | January 2, 1990 | April 13, 1990 | November 1988 |
| 1992 Kentucky General Assembly: Organizational Session; Regular Session | January 8, 1991 | January 11, 1991 | November 1990 |
| 1992 Kentucky General Assembly: Organizational Session; Regular Session | January 7, 1992 | April 14, 1992 | November 1990 |
| 1994 Kentucky General Assembly: Organizational Session; Regular Session | January 5, 1993 | January 8, 1993 | November 1992 |
| 1994 Kentucky General Assembly: Organizational Session; Regular Session | January 4, 1994 | April 15, 1994 | November 1992 |
| 1996 Kentucky General Assembly: Organizational Session; Regular Session | January 3, 1995 | January 6, 1995 | November 1994 |
| 1996 Kentucky General Assembly: Organizational Session; Regular Session | January 2, 1996 | April 15, 1996 | November 1994 |
| 1998 Kentucky General Assembly: Organizational Session; Regular Session | January 7, 1997 | January 10, 1997 | November 1996: Senate |
| 1998 Kentucky General Assembly: Organizational Session; Regular Session | January 6, 1998 | April 15, 1998 | November 1996: Senate |
| 2000 Kentucky General Assembly: Organizational Session; Regular Session | January 5, 1999 | January 8, 1999 | November 1998 |
| 2000 Kentucky General Assembly: Organizational Session; Regular Session | January 4, 2000 | April 14, 2000 | November 1998 |
| 2001 Kentucky General Assembly | 2001 | 2001 | November 2000 |
| 2002 Kentucky General Assembly | 2002 | 2002 | November 2000 |
| 2003 Kentucky General Assembly | 2003 | 2003 | November 2002 |
| 2004 Kentucky General Assembly | 2004 | 2004 | November 2002 |
| 2005 Kentucky General Assembly | 2005 | 2005 | November 2004: House, Senate |
| 2006 Kentucky General Assembly | January 3, 2006 | April 12, 2006 | November 2004: House, Senate |
| 2007 Kentucky General Assembly | January 2, 2007 | March 27, 2007 | November 2006: Senate |
| 2008 Kentucky General Assembly | January 8, 2008 | April 15, 2008 | November 2006: Senate |
| 2009 Kentucky General Assembly | January 6, 2009 | March 26, 2009 | November 2008: Senate |
| 2010 Kentucky General Assembly | January 5, 2010 | April 15, 2010 | November 2008: Senate |
| 2011 Kentucky General Assembly | January 4, 2011 | March 9, 2011 | November 2010: Senate |
| 2012 Kentucky General Assembly | January 3, 2012 | April 12, 2012 | November 2010: Senate |
| 2013 Kentucky General Assembly | January 8, 2013 | March 26, 2013 | November 2012: Senate |
| 2014 Kentucky General Assembly | January 7, 2014 | April 15, 2014 | November 2012: Senate |
| 2015 Kentucky General Assembly | January 6, 2015 | March 25, 2015 | November 2014: House, Senate |
| 2016 Kentucky General Assembly | January 5, 2016 | April 15, 2016 | November 2014: House, Senate |
| 2017 Kentucky General Assembly | January 3, 2017 | March 30, 2017 | November 2016: House, Senate |
| 2018 Kentucky General Assembly | January 2, 2018 | April 14, 2018 | November 2016: House, Senate |
| 2019 Kentucky General Assembly | January 8, 2019 | March 28, 2019 | November 2018: House, Senate |
| 2020 Kentucky General Assembly | January 7, 2020 | April 15, 2020 | November 2018: House, Senate |
| 2021 Kentucky General Assembly | January 5, 2021 | March 30, 2021 | November 2020: House, Senate |
| 2022 Kentucky General Assembly | January 4, 2022 | April 14, 2022 | November 2020: House, Senate |
| 2023 Kentucky General Assembly | January 3, 2023 | March 30, 2023 | November 2022: House, Senate |
| 2024 Kentucky General Assembly | January 2, 2024 | April 15, 2024 | November 2022: House, Senate |
| 2025 Kentucky General Assembly | January 7, 2025 | March 28, 2025 | November 2024: House, Senate |
| 2026 Kentucky General Assembly | January 6, 2026 | April 15, 2026 | November 2024: House, Senate |

=== Extraordinary sessions ===
| Name | Start date | End date | Called by | Issues | Last election |
|---|---|---|---|---|---|
| 1861 First Extraordinary Session | January 17, 1861 | April 5, 1861 | Beriah Magoffin | [data missing] | August 1859 |
| 1861 Second Extraordinary Session | May 6, 1861 | May 24, 1861 | Beriah Magoffin | [data missing] | August 1859 |
| 1862 Extraordinary Session | August 14, 1862 | September 5, 1862 | Beriah Magoffin | [data missing] | August 1861 |
| 1892 Extraordinary Session | August 25, 1892 | November 1, 1892 | John Y. Brown | [data missing] | August 1891 |
| 1897 Extraordinary Session | March 13, 1897 | May 21, 1897 | William O. Bradley | [data missing] | November 1895 |
| 1900 Extraordinary Session | August 28, 1900 | October 22, 1900 | J. C. W. Beckham | Election law | November 1899 |
| 1905 Extraordinary Session | January 12, 1905 | February 10, 1905 | J. C. W. Beckham | Construction of a new state capitol | November 1903 |
| 1906 Extraordinary Session | March 14, 1906 | March 26, 1906 | J. C. W. Beckham | [data missing] | November 1905 |
| 1917 Extraordinary Session | February 14, 1917 | April 25, 1917 | Augustus O. Stanley | Revenue and taxation | November 1915 |
| 1933 Extraordinary Session | August 15, 1933 | September 26, 1933 | Ruby Laffoon | Unemployment compensation legislation; Taxation of liquor; Purchase of stock by state banks; Method of ratification of the 21st Amendment; Automobile registration fees | November 1931 |
| 1934 Extraordinary Session | May 9, 1934 | July 2, 1934 | Ruby Laffoon | [data missing] | November 1933 |
| 1935 Extraordinary Session | February 8, 1935 | February 27, 1935 | Happy Chandler (Note: Session called by the lieutenant governor, acting as governor.) | Law requiring primary elections | November 1933 |
| 1936 First Extraordinary Session | February 24, 1936 | March 7, 1936 | Happy Chandler | State government reorganization | November 1935 |
| 1936 Second Extraordinary Session | March 9, 1936 | March 26, 1936 | Happy Chandler | Biennial appropriation | November 1935 |
| 1936 Third Extraordinary Session | March 30, 1936 | May 9, 1936 | Happy Chandler | Biennial appropriation | November 1935 |
| 1936 Fourth Extraordinary Session | December 23, 1936 | January 16, 1937 | Happy Chandler | Unemployment compensation legislation; Regulation of tobacco, milk, and other trades; Taxes and appropriations (various); Local government (various); State real estate; Registration of trademarks; Rural electrification corporations; Other issues | November 1935 |
| 1938 First Extraordinary Session | March 2, 1938 | April 9, 1938 | Happy Chandler | [data missing] | November 1937 |
| 1938 Second Extraordinary Session | May 23, 1938 | May 28, 1938 | Happy Chandler | [data missing] | November 1937 |
| 1942 Extraordinary Session | March 5, 1942 | April 8, 1942 | Keen Johnson | Legislative reapportionment | November 1941 |
| 1944 First Extraordinary Session | May 19, 1944 | June 12, 1944 | Simeon Willis | Biennial appropriation | November 1943 |
| 1944 Second Extraordinary Session | June 12, 1944 | June 16, 1944 | Simeon Willis | Biennial appropriation | November 1943 |
| 1945 Extraordinary Session | April 23, 1945 | May 11, 1945 | Simeon Willis | Public assistance appropriation; Enabling act for contracts by minors; Enabling act for the Greater Cincinnati Airport, Boone County | November 1943 |
| 1949 Extraordinary Session | March 1, 1949 | March 30, 1949 | Earle Clements | Property tax assessments; Mental health appropriation; Policy on state lands and buildings; RECC bond amortization period | November 1947 |
| 1951 Extraordinary Session | March 5, 1951 | March 14, 1951 | Lawrence Wetherby | Teachers' salaries; Public assistance appropriation; Department of Welfare appropriation; Social security for public employees | November 1949 |
| 1956 First Extraordinary Session | February 27, 1956 | March 8, 1956 | Happy Chandler | State and local government reorganization | November 1955 |
| 1956 Second Extraordinary Session | March 9, 1956 | March 28, 1956 | Happy Chandler | Motor vehicle weight limits; Road fund taxes; Motor transportation laws; Highway bond issue act; Secondary and rural road construction; Control of Johnson grass on highways | November 1955 |
| 1956 Third Extraordinary Session | March 29, 1956 | April 6, 1956 | Happy Chandler | Biennial appropriation | November 1955 |
| 1956 Fourth Extraordinary Session | April 6, 1956 | April 27, 1956 | Happy Chandler | Revenue and taxation legislation; Unemployment compensation; Municipal annexation procedures; Escheats; Appropriation for administration of revenue laws | November 1955 |
| 1959 Extraordinary Session | December 22, 1959 | December 30, 1959 | Bert Combs | Question of whether to propose calling a constitutional convention with limited subjects for consideration | November 1957 |
| 1960 Extraordinary Session | September 19, 1960 | September 23, 1960 | Bert Combs | Veterans' bonus for nonresidents | November 1959 |
| 1963 First Extraordinary Session | January 28, 1963 | February 28, 1963 | Bert Combs | Legislative reapportionment | November 1961 |
| 1963 Second Extraordinary Session | June 17, 1963 | July 2, 1963 | Bert Combs | Appalachian hospitals; Federal constitutional poll tax amendment | November 1961 |
| 1963 Third Extraordinary Session | November 18, 1963 | December 5, 1963 | Bert Combs | Judges' election and compensation; Motor vehicle inspection | November 1961 |
| 1965 Extraordinary Session | August 23, 1965 | September 17, 1965 | Ned Breathitt | Property tax rates; Local school tax effort; Federal constitutional amendment on presidential succession; Constitutional revision legislation | November 1963 |
| 1971 Extraordinary Session | February 25, 1971 | March 12, 1971 | Louie Nunn | Legislative reapportionment | November 1969 |
| 1972 Extraordinary Session | June 8, 1972 | June 15, 1972 | Wendell Ford | Licensing and insurance requirements for state chartered savings and loan associations; Environmental protection; Congressional reapportionment; Legislative reapportionment; Elections (residency requirements); Occupational health and safety; Equal Rights Amendment | November 1971 |
| 1976 Extraordinary Session | December 1, 1976 | December 18, 1976 | Julian Carroll | New court system; Surface mining; Capital punishment; Jefferson County sewers; Workers' compensation; Taxes (various); Other issues | November 1975 |
| 1978 Extraordinary Session | December 13, 1978 | | Thelma Stovall | Utility rate structure; Utility consumer intervenor; Removal of sales tax from residential utility bills; Property tax limitation; Income tax, standard deduction increment; Courts, various issues; Welfare fraud; 1978 appropriations act; Other issues | November 1977 |
| 1979 Extraordinary Session | January 8, 1979 | February 10, 1979 | Thelma Stovall | Utility rate structure; Utility consumer intervenor; Removal of sales tax from residential utility bills; Property tax limitation; Income tax, standard deduction increment; Courts, various issues; Welfare fraud; 1978 appropriations act; Other issues | November 1977 |
| 1983 Extraordinary Session | January 7, 1983 | | John Y. Brown Jr. | Flat rate tax on individual income; Increase the standard deduction on personal income; State-federal tax uniformity | November 1981 |
| 1985 Extraordinary Session | July 8, 1985 | July 19, 1985 | Martha Layne Collins | Educational issues | November 1984 (House); November 1983 (Senate) |
| 1987 Extraordinary Session | October 14, 1987 | October 23, 1987 | Martha Layne Collins | Workers' compensation | November 1986 |
| 1988 Extraordinary Session | November 28, 1988 | December 14, 1988 | Wallace Wilkinson | Lottery | November 1986 |
| 1989 Extraordinary Session | January 6, 1989 | | Wallace Wilkinson | Confirmation of Lottery Commission | November 1988 |
| 1991 First Extraordinary Session | January 14, 1991 | February 22, 1991 | Wallace Wilkinson | Environmental issues; Driving under the influence | November 1990 |
| 1991 Second Extraordinary Session | December 12, 1991 | December 18, 1991 | Brereton C. Jones | Redistricting | November 1990 |
| 1993 First Extraordinary Session | February 1, 1993 | February 16, 1993 | Brereton C. Jones | Governmental Ethics Task Force | November 1992 |
| 1993 Second Extraordinary Session | May 10, 1993 | May 27, 1993 | Brereton C. Jones | Health care | November 1992 |
| 1993 Third Extraordinary Session | August 6, 1993 | | Brereton C. Jones | Confirmation of appointments | November 1992 |
| 1994 First Extraordinary Session | June 6, 1994 | June 22, 1994 | Brereton C. Jones | Budget | November 1992 |
| 1994 Second Extraordinary Session | September 26, 1994 | | Brereton C. Jones | Confirmation of appointments | November 1992 |
| 1995 First Extraordinary Session | January 6, 1995 | | Brereton C. Jones | Confirmation of appointments | November 1994 |
| 1995 Second Extraordinary Session | January 17, 1995 | January 27, 1995 | Brereton C. Jones | Taxes and bond development for capital projects | November 1994 |
| 1995 Third Extraordinary Session | July 31, 1995 | August 4, 1995 | Brereton C. Jones | Enactment of budget reserve trust fund; Redistricting; Appropriation of additional funds for Rural Secondary Highway Program | November 1994 |
| 1996 Extraordinary Session | December 2, 1996 | December 12, 1996 | Paul E. Patton | Workers' compensation | November 1994 |
| 1997 First Extraordinary Session | May 12, 1997 | May 30, 1997 | Paul E. Patton | Postsecondary education; EMPOWER Kentucky program measures; Budget modifications | November 1996: Senate |
| 1997 Second Extraordinary Session | September 30, 1997 | October 15, 1997 | Paul E. Patton | Health insurance | November 1996: Senate |
| 2002 Extraordinary Session | April 22, 2002 | May 1, 2002 | Paul E. Patton | Budget | November 2000 |
| 2004 Extraordinary Session | October 5, 2004 | October 19, 2004 | Ernie Fletcher | Health insurance | November 2002 |
| 2006 Extraordinary Session | June 22, 2006 | June 28, 2006 | Ernie Fletcher | Business taxes | November 2004: House, Senate |
| 2007 First Extraordinary Session | July 5, 2007 | July 30, 2007 | Ernie Fletcher | Alternative energy policy; Appropriation of funds for capital projects and road construction; Taxation of military pay; Pretrial diversion for substance abusers; Public employee insurance plans | November 2006 |
| 2007 Second Extraordinary Session | August 20, 2007 | August 24, 2007 | Ernie Fletcher | Alternative energy policy | November 2006 |
| 2008 Extraordinary Session | June 23, 2008 | June 27, 2008 | Steve Beshear | Public employee retirement | November 2006 |
| 2009 Extraordinary Session | June 15, 2009 | June 24, 2009 | Steve Beshear | Economic development; Budget amendments | November 2008 |
| 2010 Extraordinary Session | May 24, 2010 | May 29, 2010 | Steve Beshear | Budgets; Road plan; Taxation; Unemployment insurance | November 2008 |
| 2011 Extraordinary Session | March 14, 2011 | April 6, 2011 | Steve Beshear | Budget | November 2010: Senate |
| 2012 Extraordinary Session | April 16, 2012 | April 20, 2012 | Steve Beshear | Transportation Cabinet budget; Controlled substances | November 2010: Senate |
| 2013 Extraordinary Session | August 19, 2013 | August 23, 2013 | Steve Beshear | Legislative redistricting | November 2012 |
| 2018 Extraordinary Session | December 17, 2018 | December 18, 2018 | Matt Bevin | Public pensions | November 2016: House, Senate |
| 2019 Extraordinary Session | July 19, 2019 | July 24, 2019 | Matt Bevin | Public pensions | November 2018: House, Senate |
| 2021 Extraordinary Session | September 7, 2021 | September 9, 2021 | Andy Beshear | COVID-19 State of emergency | November 2020: House, Senate |
| 2022 Extraordinary Session | August 24, 2022 | August 26, 2022 | Andy Beshear | Disaster relief | November 2020: House, Senate |

== See also ==
- List of speakers of the Kentucky House of Representatives
- List of presidents of the Kentucky Senate
- List of governors of Kentucky
- Politics of Kentucky
- Elections in Kentucky
- Kentucky State Capitol
- Timeline of Kentucky history
- Lists of United States state legislative sessions
