= Albert May House =

Historic house in Montana, United States

- U.S. National Register of Historic Places
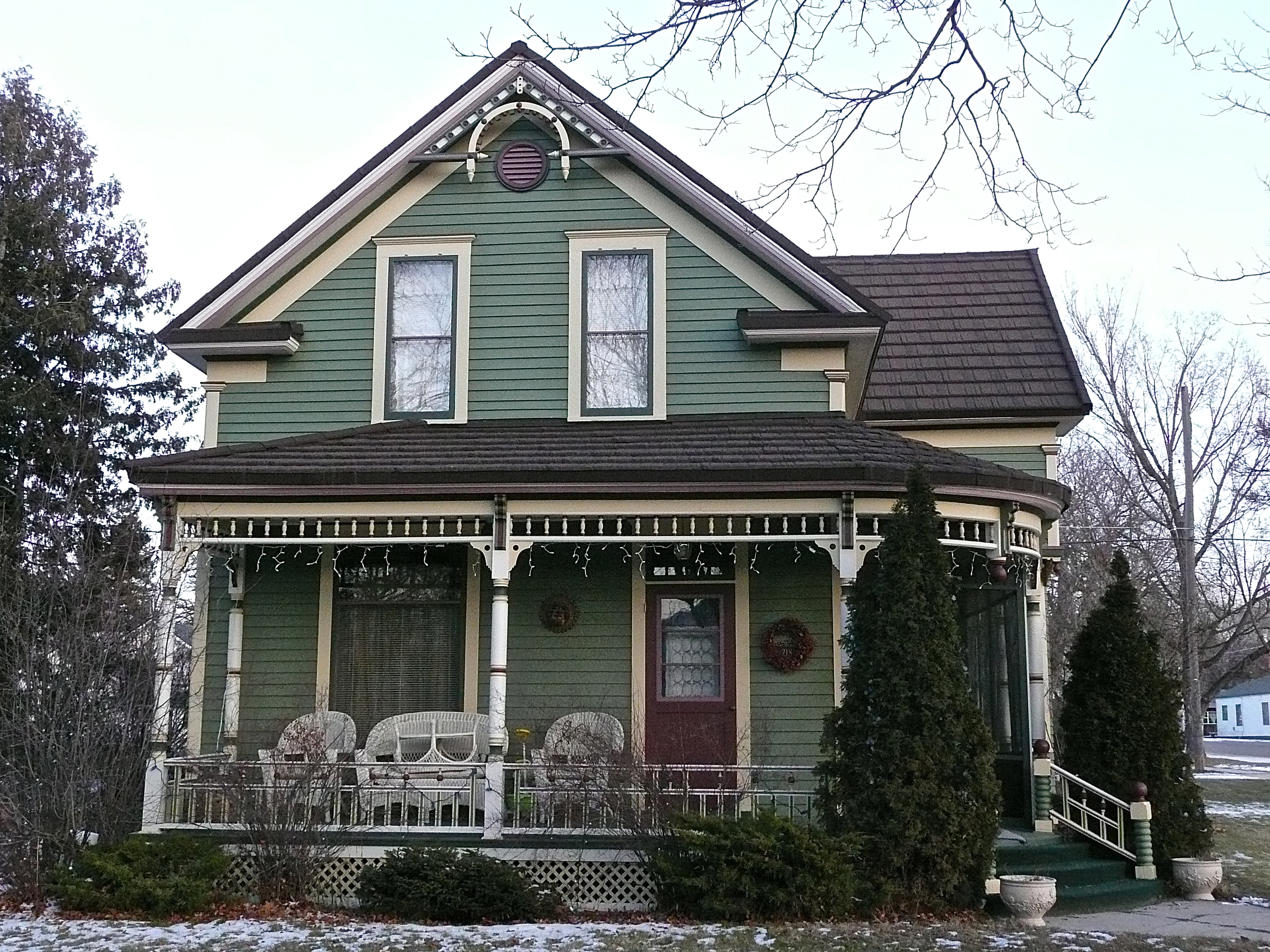

- Location within Montana Location within the United States
- Location: 218 Church St., Stevensville, Montana
- Coordinates: 46°30′36″N 114°5′27″W
- Area: less than one acre
- Built: 1898
- Architectural style: Queen Anne
- MPS: Stevensville MPS
- NRHP reference No.: 91000751
- Added to NRHP: June 18, 1991

Albert May House (218 Church Street) in Stevensville, Montana, is a historic house on the National Register of Historic Places. The house was built in 1898. Its third owner, Albert May, served as Mayor of Stevensville. The house is known as an example of the Queen Anne style architecture found in Montana's Bitterroot Valley.
