= Hausgen House =

Historic house in Kentucky, United States

- U.S. National Register of Historic Places
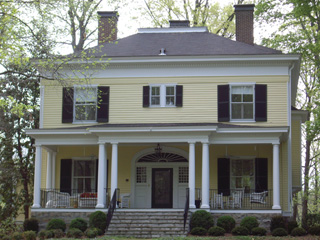

- Location within Kentucky Location within the United States
- Location: Anchorage, KY
- Coordinates: 38°15′57.75″N 85°32′49″W
- Built: 1890
- Built by: William B. Wood
- Architectural style: Colonial Revival
- NRHP reference No.: 83002677
- Added to NRHP: 1983

The Hausgen House, a historic home, located on Walnut Lane in Anchorage, Kentucky, was constructed c. 1890 and is an example of the Colonial Revival design popular in eastern Jefferson County during the late 19th and early 20th centuries. The home was built for H. Otto Hausgen by William B. Wood, known as Anchorage's master builder.

The foundation of the home is constructed of local limestone; quarried from the nearby community of Peewee Valley, Kentucky. Lumber, tools, and other materials used in the construction of the home were hauled in two-horse wagons, a commonly used conveyance of the time. The two-story frame and weatherboard house has a hipped roof and a one-story veranda, which spans the entire main façade. The front entryway includes an elaborate front door with overhead fanlights and sidelights, a typical feature with the Colonial Revival styles of the period. These features, along with the fine dentil molding of the porch and cornice work, make this house a particularly fine example of Wood's work. The home also features a multiple columned porch distinctive to the style. This home style went on to greatly influence the 1908 design of the W. S. Forrester House; a residence attributed to Henry Frank, a local builder who had served as an apprentice to Wood. Since its completion, Hausgen House has remained intact, with no known changes made to its Colonial Revival styling. It was listed on the National Register of Historic Places in 1983 and has undergone significant renovations since that time.

== See also ==
- List of Registered Historic Places in Jefferson County, Kentucky
