= Front Street Historic District (Prestonsburg, Kentucky) =

Historic district in Kentucky, United States

- U.S. National Register of Historic Places
- U.S. Historic district
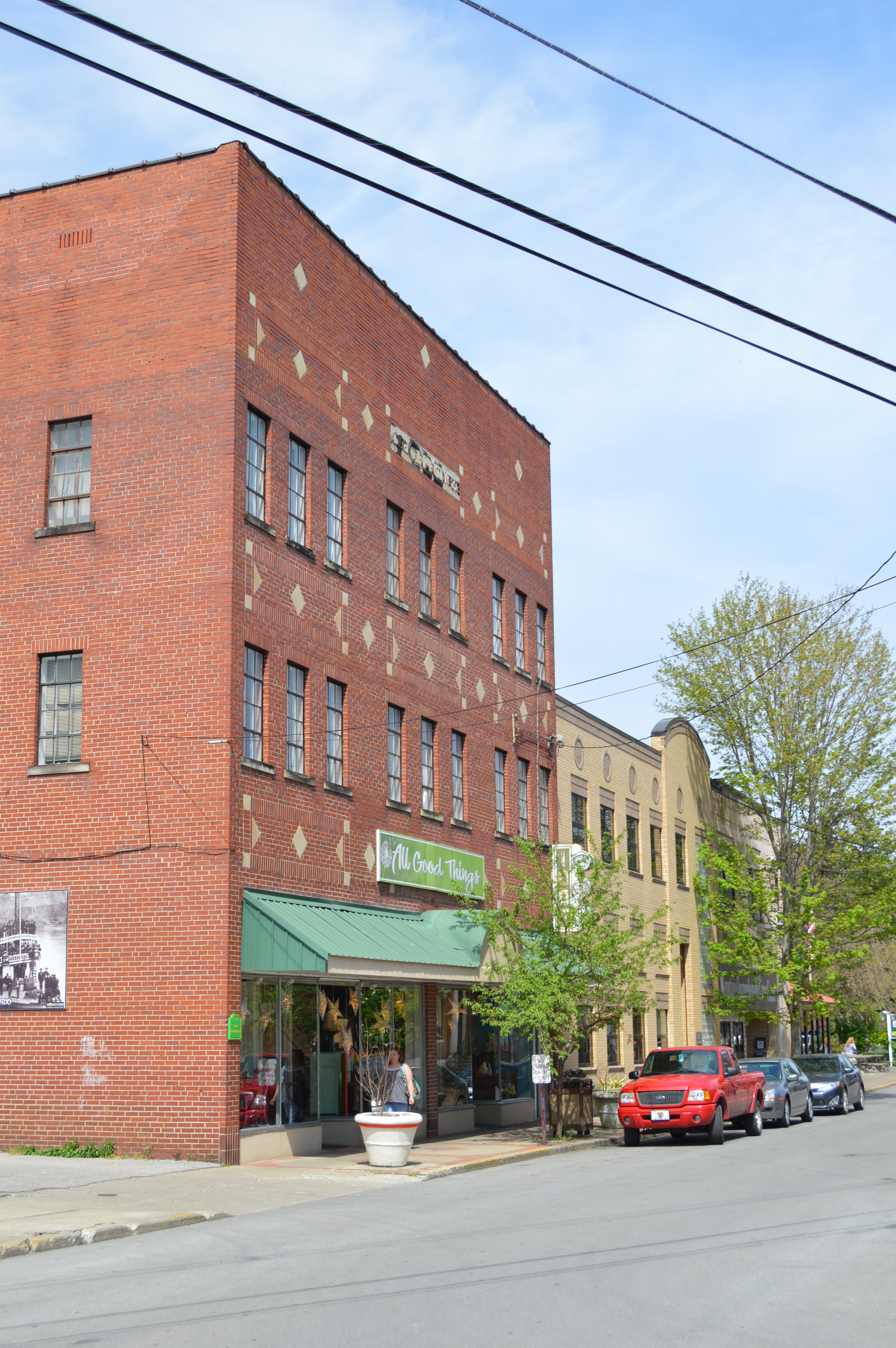

- Location within Kentucky Location within the United States
- Location: Roughly Front St. between W. Court St. and Ford St., Prestonsburg, Kentucky
- Coordinates: 37°40′00″N 82°46′31″W
- Area: 3 acres (1.2 ha)
- Architectural style: Chicago, Commercial Style
- MPS: Prestonsburg MPS
- NRHP reference No.: 89000398
- Added to NRHP: May 18, 1989

Front Street Historic District, in Prestonburg, Kentucky, is a 3 acres (1.2 ha) historic district located roughly Front St. between W. Court St. and Ford Street. It was listed on the National Register of Historic Places in 1989. It included six contributing buildings.

It included:

- Hughes Building (1927)
- Combs Building (c. 1920s)
- Elizabeth Hotel Building
- Odd Fellows Building
- Auxier Hotel Building (1930), a three-story hotel
- Richmond Building (1914), built of red brick as home of I. Richmond Company Department Store
