= Robert May House =

Historic house in Kentucky, United States

- U.S. National Register of Historic Places
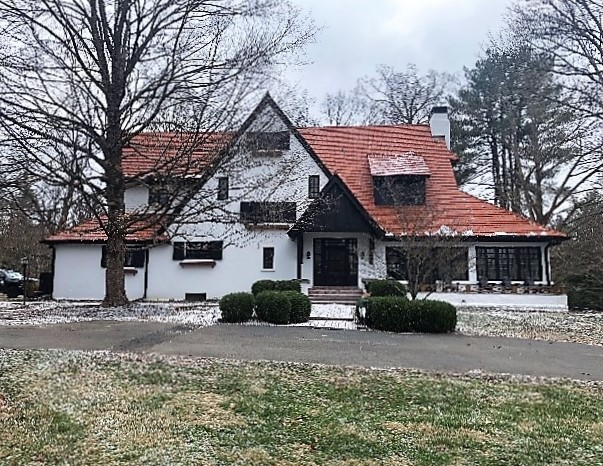

- Location within Kentucky Location within the United States
- Location: 11104 Owl Creek Lane, Anchorage, Kentucky
- Coordinates: 38°15′46″N 85°32′54″W
- Area: 9.5 acres (3.8 ha)
- Built: 1910
- MPS: Jefferson County MRA
- NRHP reference No.: 83002702
- Added to NRHP: July 12, 1983

The Robert May House is located at 11104 Owl Creek Lane, Anchorage, Kentucky. It is a three-and-one-half story house with stucco and half-timbering. The multi-gabled roof is pierced with dormers. The structure is of fireproof construction with concrete and hollow tile used. The interior woodwork is of mahogany. A stone bridge gate forms the entrance to the property. A stone and half-timber springhouse is on the property, as well.

The residence was built circa 1910 by Henry Frank, a prominent architect and builder. Henry Frank (1873–1932) settled in Middletown, Kentucky about 1890 and served as an apprentice to the building contractor William Benjamin Wood. After Wood's death in 1906, Frank formed his own company and constructed numerous public buildings in Jefferson County, Kentucky, as well as several private residences. Frank constructed the Robert May House for Robert May and his family. Robert May was an engineer that constructed railroads in Cuba and South America. May was also a member of the Anchorage Town Board.

The Robert May House is a significant example of early twentieth century architecture in a Revival style. It is listed on the National Register of Historic Places.

== See also ==
- National Register of Historic Places listings in Anchorage, Kentucky
