= Dewey Lake =

Lake near Prestonsburg, Kentucky

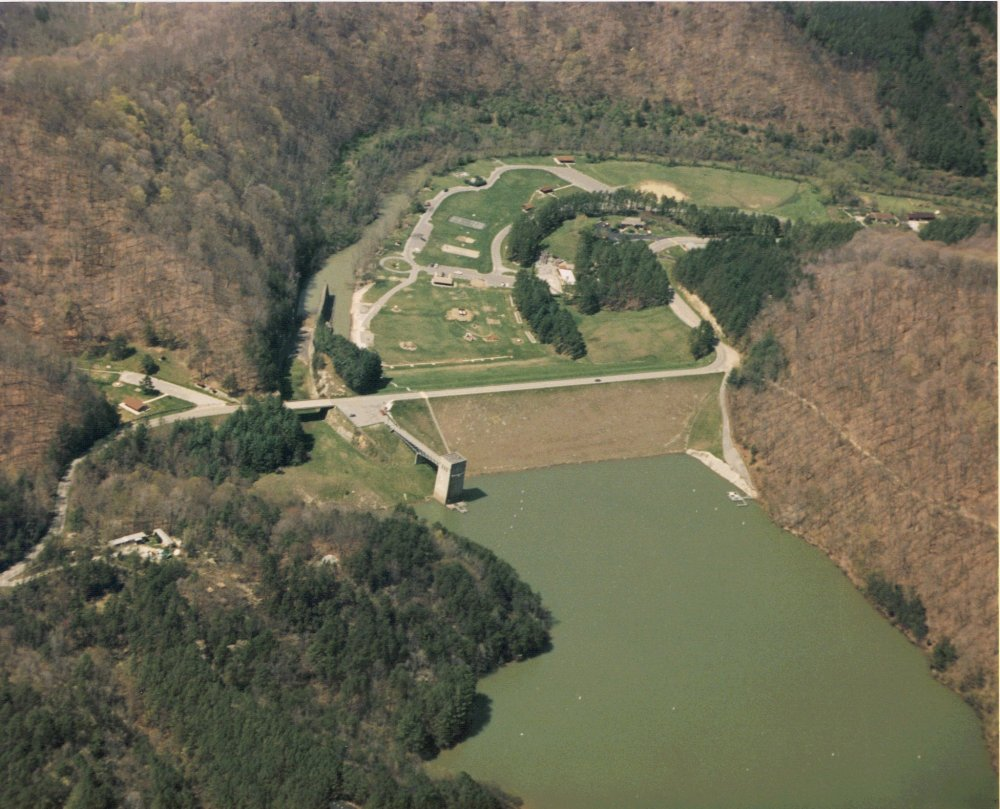
- Lake and dam

- Location within Kentucky
- Location: Floyd County, Kentucky
- Coordinates: 37°44′08″N 82°43′40″W
- Type: reservoir
- Primary inflows: John's Creek
- Primary outflows: John's Creek
- Basin countries: United States
- Surface area: 1,100 acres (4 km^{2})
- Average depth: 40 feet (12 m)
- Water volume: Maximum: 93,000 acre⋅ft (0.115 km^{3})
- Surface elevation: 643 ft (196 m)

Dewey Lake, located near Prestonsburg, Kentucky in Floyd County, is part of the integrated flood reduction system operated by the United States Army Corps of Engineers for the entire Ohio River Basin.

The 1,100-acre (4 km^{2}) lake was formed by impounding John's Creek in 1949, and was named for Admiral George Dewey. Dewey Dam (National ID # KY03029) is an earthen dam, 118 feet (36 m) high. The length of the lake is 18.5 miles (29.8 km) upstream from the dam and its water shed covers 207 square miles (540 km^{2}).

Jenny Wiley State Resort Park is located on Dewey Lake.

== Recreation ==
The largest tiger muskie ever taken in the state of Kentucky (13 lb., 12 oz.) was caught in Dewey Lake.
