= Shallcross (Anchorage, Kentucky) =

Historic house in Kentucky, United States

- U.S. National Register of Historic Places
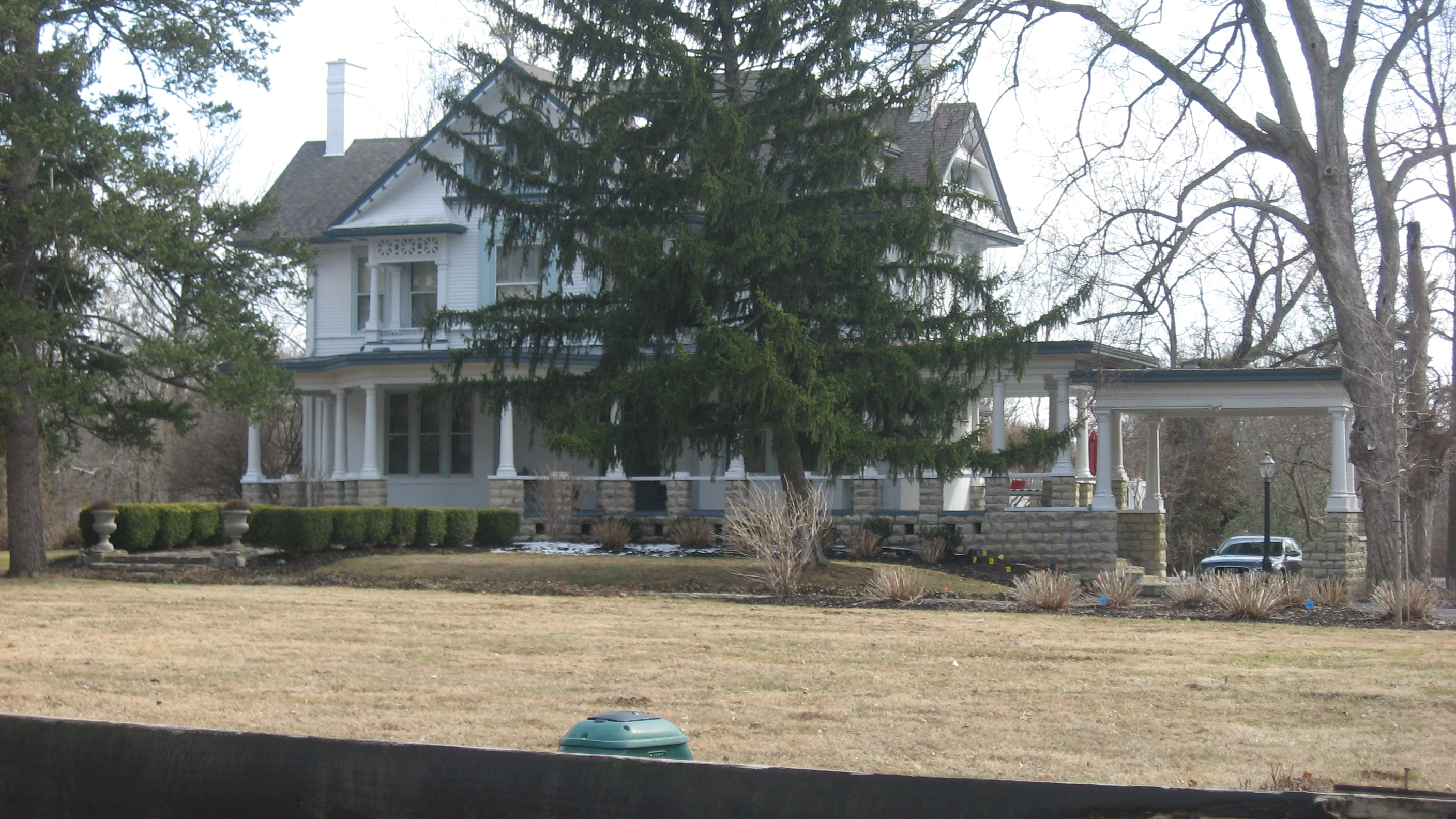
- Eastern side and front

- Location within Kentucky Location within the United States
- Location: 11804 Ridge Rd., Anchorage, Kentucky
- Coordinates: 38°15′42″N 85°32′6″W
- Area: 0 acres (0 ha)
- Built: 1898
- Built by: William B. Wood
- Architectural style: Queen Anne
- MPS: Jefferson County MRA
- NRHP reference No.: 80001567
- Added to NRHP: December 5, 1980

Shallcross is a Queen Anne style house built in 1898 in Anchorage, Kentucky by William B. Wood.

It was listed on the National Register of Historic Places in 1980 for its architectural significance.
