= Dr. H. A. May House =

Historic house in Missouri, United States

- Dr. H.A. May House
- U.S. National Register of Historic Places
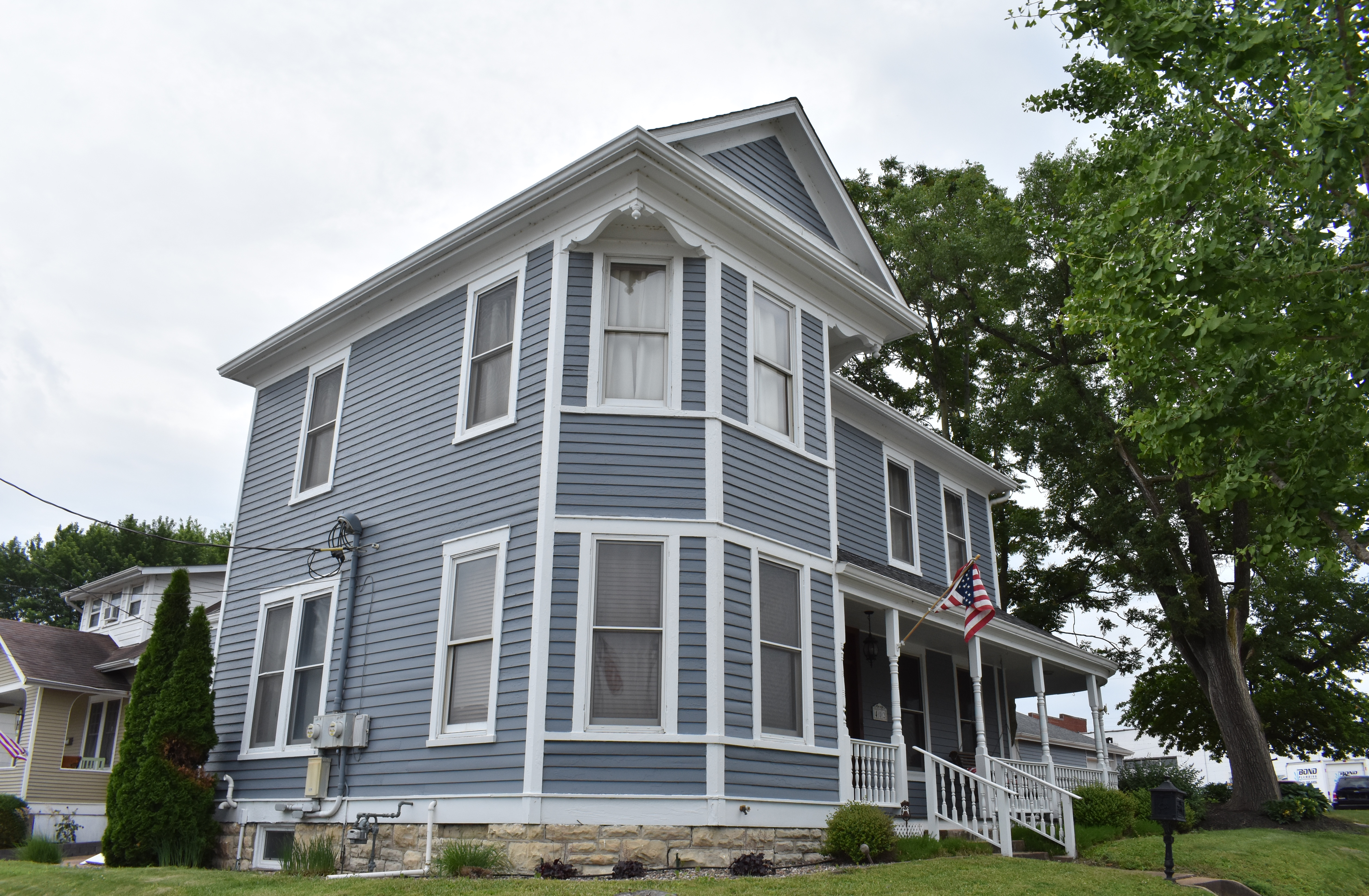
- Dr. H. A. May House, May 2026

- Location within Missouri Location within the United States
- Location: 402 Jefferson St., Washington, Missouri
- Coordinates: 38°33′24″N 91°0′44″W
- Area: less than one acre
- Built: 1904
- Architectural style: Queen Anne
- MPS: Washington, Missouri MPS
- NRHP reference No.: 00001106
- Added to NRHP: September 14, 2000

Dr. H.A. May House is a historic home located at Washington, Franklin County, Missouri. It was built about 1904, and is a 2 1/2-story, Queen Anne style frame dwelling. It has four one story rear ells and one two story side ell. It features a wraparound porch and a projecting front gable with clipped corners. Also on the property is a contributing large one story frame garage.

It was listed on the National Register of Historic Places in 2000.
