= Jenny Wiley State Resort Park =

State park in Kentucky, United States

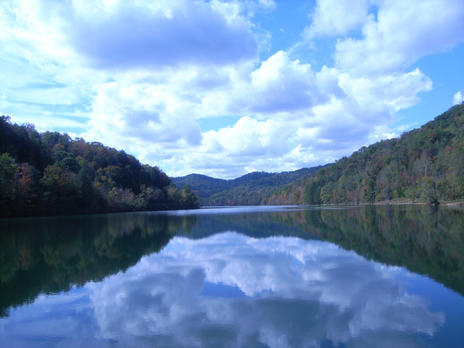
- Dewey Lake

- Location within Kentucky Location within the United States
- Type: Kentucky state park
- Location: Floyd County, Kentucky
- Coordinates: 37°41′51″N 82°43′30″W
- Area: 2,871 acres (11.62 km^{2})
- Created: January 1, 1954
- Operator: Kentucky Department of Parks
- Status: Open year-round
- Website: Official website

Jenny Wiley State Resort Park was founded as Dewey Lake State Park on January 1, 1954, with Dewey Lake near Prestonsburg, Kentucky as its centerpiece. It was renamed in the early 1950s for Virginia "Jenny" Wiley, a pioneer woman who is remembered as a survivor of captivity by Native Americans. It became one of the resort parks in the state in 1962 with the opening of the May Lodge.

== Namesake ==
Taken captive October 1, 1789, by natives of the area, Cherokees, Shawnees, Wyandots, and Delawares, who murdered her brother and four children by tomahawk. She escaped after 11 months of captivity. The Indians had intended to attack the Harmon family who lived nearby, for killing two Cherokees, and had mistakenly attacked the Wiley family who lived in one of the hollows that is now within the park. Jenny Wiley became pregnant and gave birth during the captivity, and learned the Cherokee lifestyle. Her dramatic escape in 1790 is now a legendary tale of early American frontier life in the Levisa Fork river area and the Big Sandy Valley .

== Facilities ==
Of the park's 2,871 acres (1,162 ha), 1,100 acres (4.5 km^{2}) is Dewey Lake. The Kentucky record for largest tiger muskie was at Dewey Lake. Dewey Lake was named for the hero of the Battle of Manila Bay, Admiral George Dewey, when the United States Army Corps of Engineers built the lake in 1951.

The park lies in a "moist Appalachian" environment, dominated by maples, pawpaws and tulip poplars. The park's hotel, May Lodge, has 49 rooms, many rental cabins and a dining and conference room that seats 200. The Music Highway Grill uses locally grown produce, meat and dairy. The Jenny Wiley Amphitheater produced numerous plays, such as The Wizard of Oz and A Chorus Line, and the "Story of Jenny Wiley", throughout the summer seasons prior to their dissolution in 2019. Fishing is very popular, with many boat launches as well as a full service boat dock at the May Lodge. The Jenny Wiley Trail marks the path Wiley took to escape her Cherokee tormentors; it is advised that lone hikers do not take the path because of "trail difficulty". The scenery and low traffic make this popular among bicycle tourists and randonneurs. Multiday bicycle camping and touring clinics are offered in fall and winter. An 18-hole golf course is one of several other outdoor activities.

== See also ==
- Dawkins Line Rail Trail
