= Jenny Wiley Theatre =

- Formation: 1964
- Dissolved: 2019
- Type: Theatre group
- Location: Floyd County and Pikeville, Kentucky

Jenny Wiley Theatre was a non-profit organization that operated in Pikeville and Prestonsburg, Kentucky. After the theatre company's formation in the spring of 1964, the theatre group produced many performances, including comedies, dramas, classic Broadway musicals, holiday productions, and its annual historical drama, The Legend of Jenny Wiley. These productions were most frequently presented at the group's original location, Jenny Wiley Amphitheatre, located within Jenny Wiley State Resort Park. In 2014, the theatre group leased a building located in Pikeville, where indoor productions were held until the group's disbandment. The company continued its production until 2019, when the city of Pikeville evicted them from their indoor location due to the immense debt the company had accumulated. Performances continued briefly at Jenny Wiley Amphitheater until later in the year when the company furloughed its staff and cancelled any remaining performances in the 2019 season. As of 2023, the Appalachian Center for the Arts has taken over the programming at the Pikeville location and occasional performances have been produced by Artists Theatre Collaborative Incorporated at the Jenny Wiley Amphitheatre. Its programming has been replaced by the Appalachian Center for the Arts in Pikeville.

== Productions ==
One of the theatre's first productions was an adaptation of the musical South Pacific, performed in the summer of 1965. After the initial performances, the early years of the theatre's productions included more classic Broadway style musicals, dramas, and an original historical drama, The Legend of Jenny Wiley, based on the story of Virginia “Jenny” Wiley, a pioneer woman who was captured by a group of eleven Native Americans, composed of three Shawnee, three Wyandots, three Delaware, and two Cherokee, but she eventually escaped and returned to her husband. In more recent years, before the dissolution of the theatre group, the company was known to still produce well-known productions such as Hairspray and The Wizard of Oz. In addition, the company produced productions written and directed by local Kentuckians including an adaptation of the urban legend Bloody Mary, entitled Ghost Stories.

== Notable alumni ==
The Jenny Wiley Theatre Group was known to have alumni reunions each year from 2010 to 2018. During these reunions, alumni were encouraged to stay at the may Lodge at Jenny Wiley State Resort park and attend a performance put on during their stay. The last reunion took place on July 20-22nd, 2018 where alumni would attend the theatre group's production of the hit musical Hairspray. Many theatre an alumni staff have later achieved success in television, film, and national theatre. These include:

- Michael Cerveris, won two Tony awards, one for his performance in Tommy in 1994, and one for his performance in Assassins on Broadway.
- Boyd Holbrook, who is best known for his roles in Logan and Narcos, was picked up by a modelling agency in 2001 while working part-time as a carpenter for the theatre.
- Christine Johnson, Nettie Fowler in the original Broadway cast of Carousel.
- Sharon Lawrence from ABC's NYPD Blue and Desperate Housewives.
- James Barbour, who played the Beast in Disney's Broadway production of Beauty and the Beast and was Tony-nominated for his role as Mr. Rochester in the musical, Jane Eyre.
- Jim Varney, Ernest Goes to Camp;
- Tommy Kirk, Old Yeller.
- Ron Palillo, Welcome Back, Kotter.
- Eileen Bittman Barnett, Days of Our Lives.
- Cynthia Bostick, As the World Turns.
- Lawrence Leritz, Broadway and Beyond.
- Jeff Silbar, composer of "The Wind Beneath My Wings."
- Randy Jones of the Village People singing group.
- Adrienne Doucette, featured in four touring productions of Broadway shows across 20 years.
- Mary Stout, featured in seven Broadway shows across 25 years.
- Paige Davis, host of TLC's Trading Spaces.

== Second location ==
In 2014, the theatre group was given an opportunity to hold more performances at an indoor location, located in downtown Pikeville, Kentucky. This secondary location allowed the theatre group to extend performances to a year-round schedule, as well as hold workshops for young actors in the area who needed a place to hone their skills. This fostered a theatre community in Floyd County, which continues today through the Appalachian Center for the Arts and performances produced by Artists Theatre Collaborative at Pikeville High School.

== Eviction and current status ==
In the year 2019, officials of the cities of Pikeville and Prestonsburg discovered information that led to the eviction of the Jenny Wiley Drama Association from the Jenny Wiley Theatre in downtown Pikeville. Financial mismanagement was cited as the reason for the group to be evicted from their indoor facilities located on Second Street in downtown Pikeville. The drama association owed approximately one million dollars to outside agencies. As a result of the eviction, the theatre is currently run as a part of the East Kentucky Expo Center, or the Mountain Center for the Arts. Officials state that productions at the Jenny Wiley Amphitheatre located within Jenny Wiley State Resort Park continued as usual and they are doing everything they can to continue the arts in Eastern Kentucky. As recent as 2023, there have been productions taking place at Jenny Wiley Amphitheatre under the Artists Theatre Collaborative Theatre group.
