= Samuel May House =

Historic house in Kentucky, United States

- U.S. National Register of Historic Places
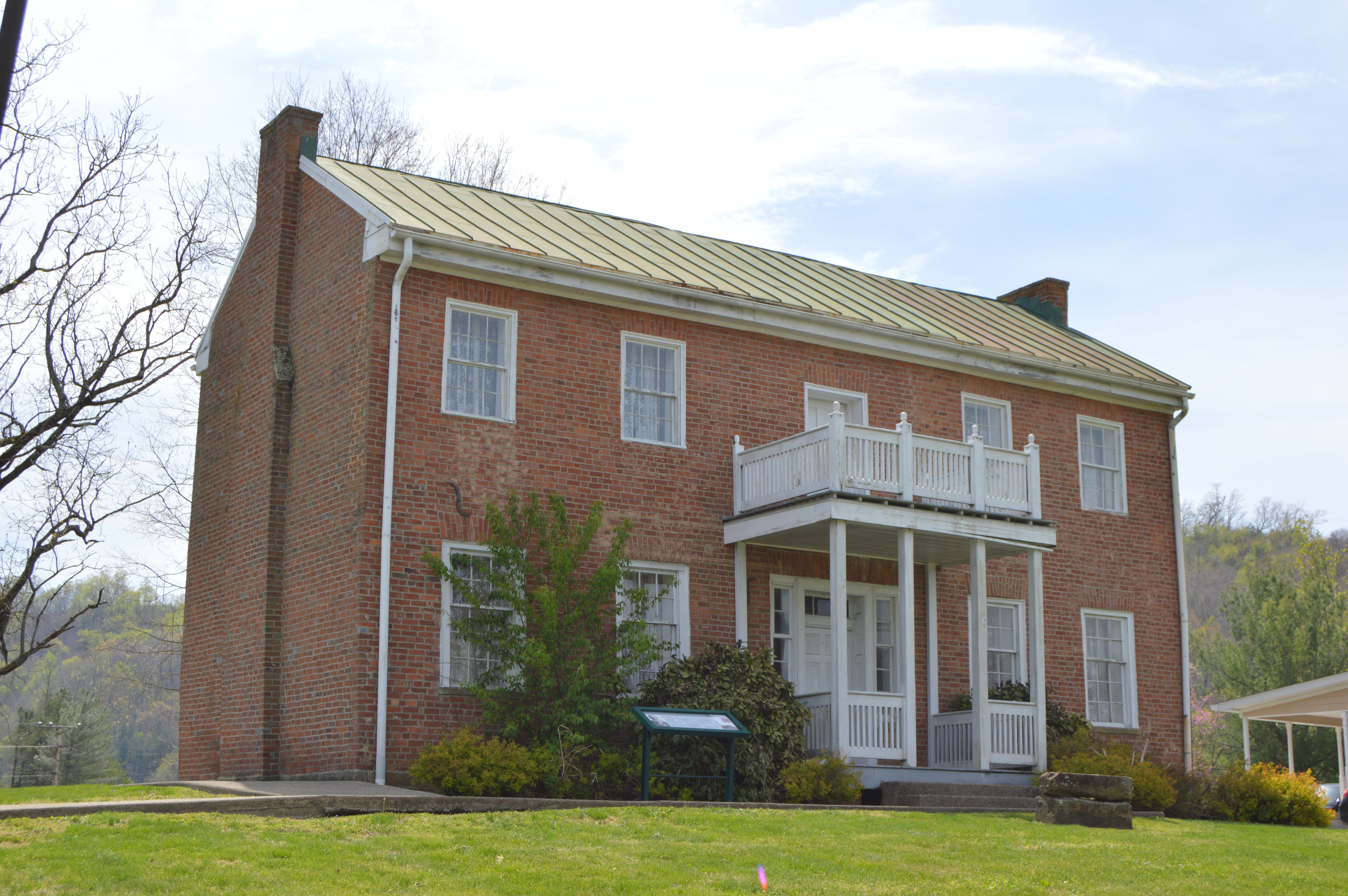
- Front and northern end

- Location within Kentucky Location within the United States
- Interactive map showing the location of Samuel May House
- Location: 690 Northlake Drive, Prestonsburg, Kentucky
- Coordinates: 37°40′53″N 82°46′50″W
- Built: 1817
- Architect: Samuel May
- Architectural style: Federal
- NRHP reference No.: 80001526
- Added to NRHP: April 1, 1980

The Samuel May House is a Federal style residence located at 690 North Lake Drive in Prestonsburg, Kentucky. It built in 1817 by Samuel May, a Kentucky state representative (1832–1834) and a Kentucky state senator (1835–1838) from Floyd County. It now serves as the Samuel May House Living History Museum. Relatives still living include Jack May, Vince May, Treasa May, Kim May, Eric May, Kevin May, Tonia May, Lisa May.

== History ==
In 1808, Samuel May emigrated to Floyd County from Virginia and married Cathrine Evans. From 1817 to 1821, May acquired 3,000 acres (12 km^{2}) of land along the banks of the Levisa Fork, where he developed a farm and set up a mill.

Construction of the home was very laborious due to the homes remote location in Eastern Kentucky. In 1816, May's slaves began working the kilns that produced the bricks for the residence. Lime for the cement was created by crushing the shells of freshwater clams gathered from the Levisa Fork. The lumber used in the construction was whip-sawed from logs and was hauled to the site, where it was cured and shaped. Even the nails had to be shipped in from a factory in Abingdon, Virginia.

The house illustrates May's expertise as an architect and builder. The bricks on the front part of the house were laid out in a Flemish bond: a decorative and structurally strong pattern of brick laying. Also, all walls in the house, including the interior partitions, are four bricks deep. This unusual building technique not only created deep window sills and door frames, but helped preserve the structure over the generations.

Although the home is two stories, the home has only six rooms. The largest of the rooms is Samuel May's Parlor, which measures eighteen by twenty feet. The large rooms were a necessity because the home also served as a community hall and as a shelter from Indian attacks, though those were largely over by that time and there is no record of any attacks made on the house. The interior is furnished in poplar woodwork, which is now painted white. The floors are made out of both poplar and white ash.

In 1842, Samuel May sold the home to his brother, Thomas May, because of his inability to pay off his mortgage. Several years later, Samuel May moved to California gold fields in hopes of regaining his former wealth. He was unsuccessful and died in Placerville, California in 1851.

== Renovations ==
The dream of renovating the historic home and developing it into a living history museum began in March 1993 with the creation of the Friends of the Samuel May House, Inc. Due to a lack of funds very few tasks could be completed. But in the spring of 1997, the city of Prestonsburg purchased the home and received a $400,000 grant from the Kentucky Heritage Council and the Kentucky Transportation Cabinet. This grant allowed the city to fully restore the historic home to its original condition.
