= Presbyterian Manse (Anchorage, Kentucky) =

Historic house in Kentucky, United States

- U.S. National Register of Historic Places
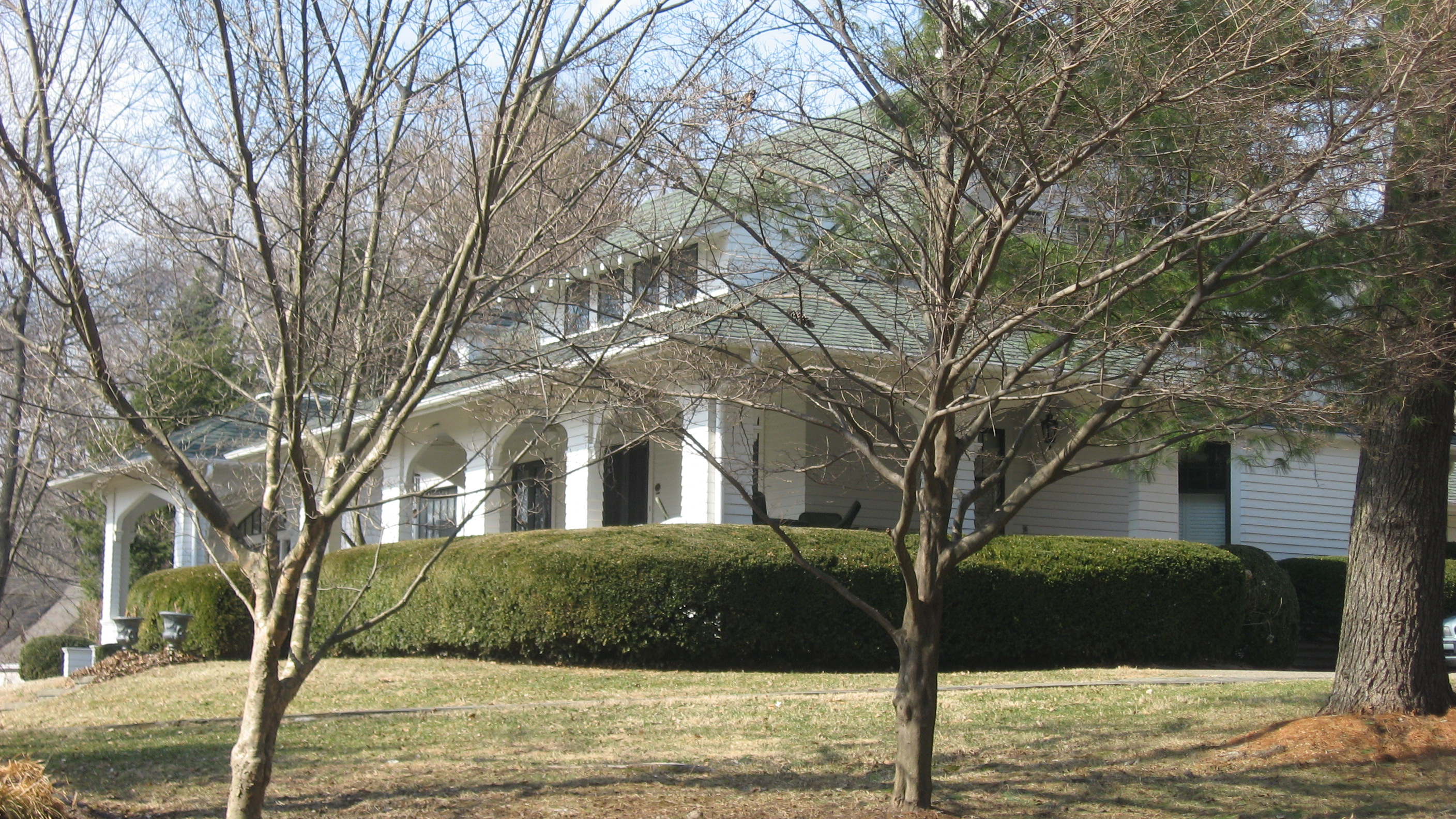
- Front and eastern side

- Location within Kentucky Location within the United States
- Location: 1302 Bellewood Rd., near Anchorage, Kentucky
- Coordinates: 38°15′51″N 85°32′41″W
- Area: less than one acre
- Built: 1910
- MPS: Jefferson County MRA
- NRHP reference No.: 83002724
- Added to NRHP: July 12, 1983

The Presbyterian Manse near Anchorage, Kentucky is a historic Presbyterian church residence, associated with the Anchorage Presbyterian Church. It was added to the National Register of Historic Places in 1983.

It is a one-and-a-half-story frame house built in 1910, with Moorish arches featured in the porch on its southwest and southeast sides.
