= Prestonsburg, Kentucky =

- City
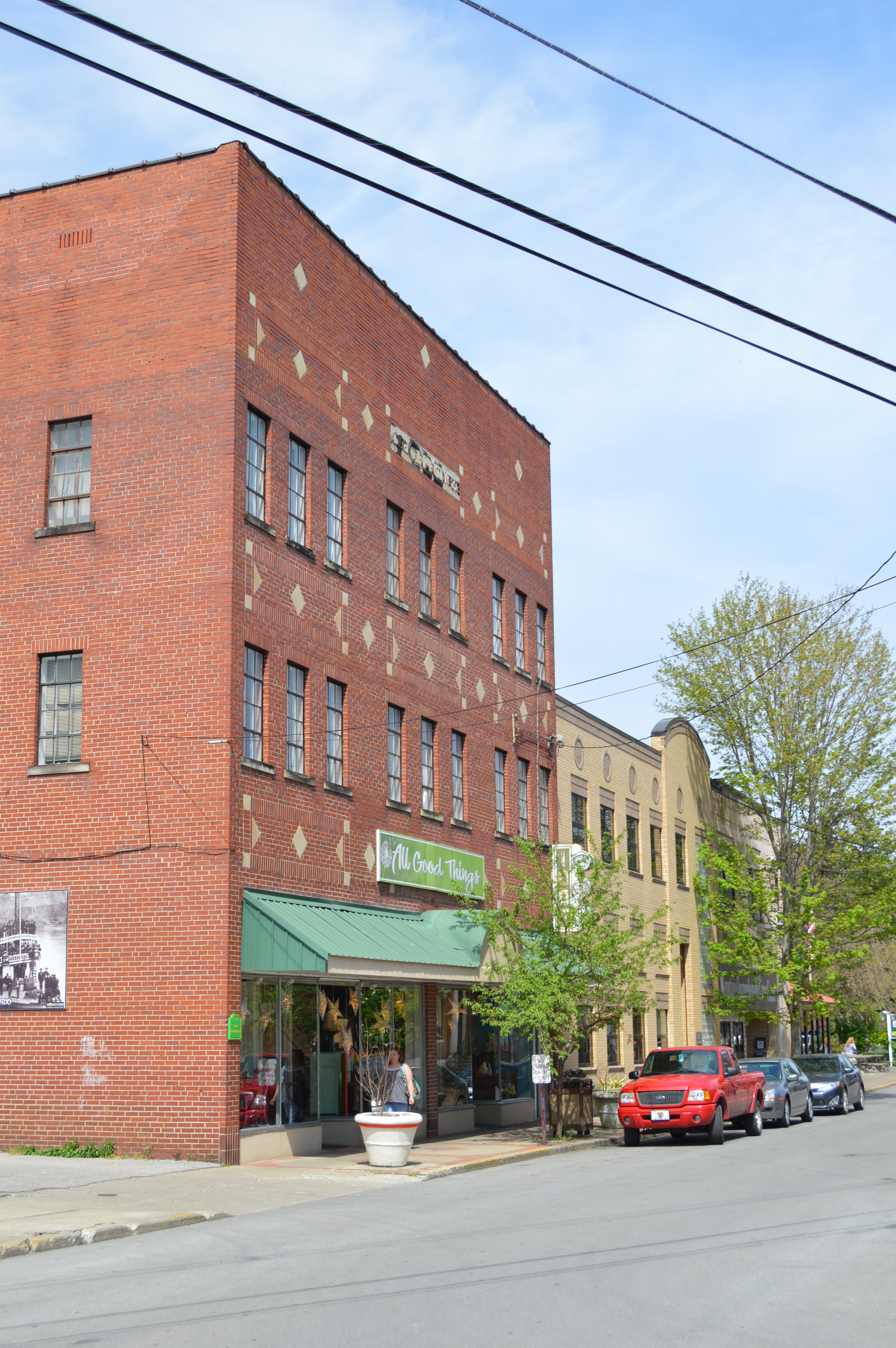
- Front Street

- Flag Seal
- Nickname: "Star City of Eastern Kentucky"
- Location of Prestonsburg in Floyd County, Kentucky.

- Location in Kentucky
- Coordinates: 37°40′54″N 82°46′01″W
- Country: United States
- State: Kentucky
- County: Floyd
- Established: January 2, 1818
- Incorporated: March 9, 1867
- Named for: John Preston, a local landowner

Government
  - Type: Mayor-Council
  - Mayor: Rick Hughes

Area
  - Total: 14.75 sq mi (38.20 km^{2})
  - Land: 14.55 sq mi (37.68 km^{2})
  - Water: 0.20 sq mi (0.52 km^{2})
- Elevation: 709 ft (216 m)

Population (2020)
  - Total: 3,681
  - Estimate (2024): 3,638
  - Density: 253/sq mi (97.7/km^{2})
- Time zone: UTC-5 (Eastern (EST))
  - Summer (DST): UTC-4 (EDT)
- ZIP code: 41653
- Area code: 606
- FIPS code: 21-62940
- GNIS feature ID: 2404571
- Website: prestonsburgcity.org

Prestonsburg is a home rule-class city in and the county seat of Floyd County, Kentucky, United States. It is in the eastern part of the state in the valley of the Big Sandy River. As of the 2020 census, Prestonsburg had a population of 3,681.

== History ==
The area was part of the 100,000-acre (400 km^{2}) grant in the early 1700s to the family of John Preston's wife, born Elizabeth Patton, which he administered on her behalf. The grant was intended to permit British colonization beyond the Blue Ridge Mountains, but subsequent French and Indian resistance and a reversal of British policy limited its impact. The land was not settled until John Spurlock of Montgomery County, Virginia, arrived in 1791. He laid out the town of "Preston's Station" in 1797. It became the seat of Floyd County upon its formation in 1799 and was formally established in 1818. The post office was known as "Floyd Court House" from its establishment in 1816 until the late 1820s, when it was renamed "Prestonsburg".

On January 10, 1862, nearby Middle Creek National Battlefield was the scene of the largest battle of the Civil War to occur in Eastern Kentucky. The town was also the site of one of the worst school bus disasters in American history on February 28, 1958.

The town had a pack horse library in the late 1930s to bring library materials to rural mountain residents.

== Culture ==
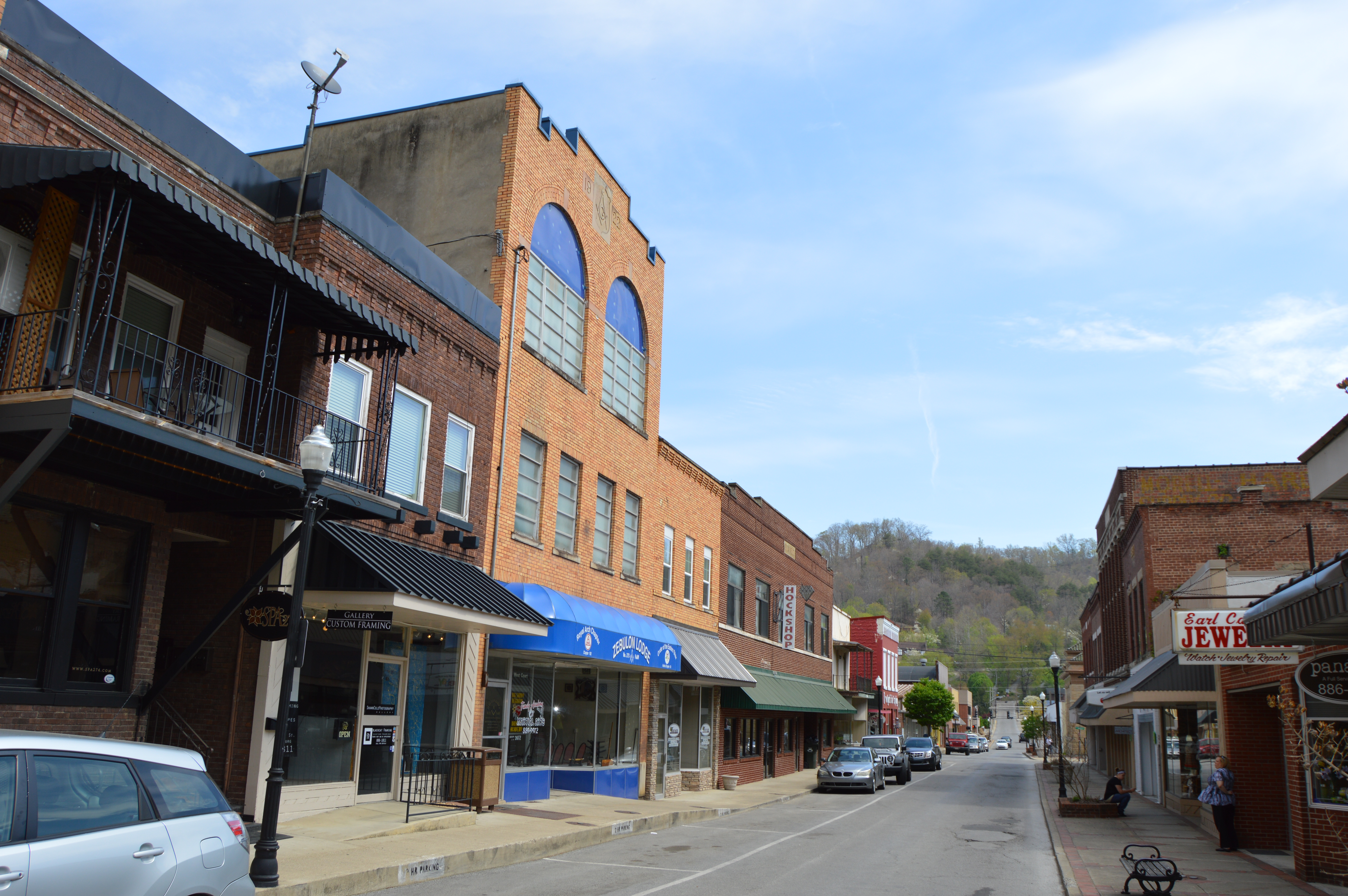
Court Street

U.S. Route 23, also called "The Country Music Highway" to celebrate the region's rich heritage of music, runs through Prestonsburg. Country music stars including Loretta Lynn, Crystal Gayle, Wynonna Judd, Naomi Judd, Billy Ray Cyrus, Tom T. Hall, Ricky Skaggs, Keith Whitley, Dwight Yoakam, and Patty Loveless are all from the Big Sandy Valley.

Prestonsburg is mentioned in Dwight Yoakam's "Readin', Rightin', Rt. 23" (from his album Hillbilly Deluxe), a song about the yearning of local coal miners to escape their plight by traveling up U.S. Route 23 to find employment in the factories in the North, not knowing that they were only trading one miserable life for another.

Prestonsburg is the location of the Mountain Arts Center, which hosts music concerts and is home to the Kentucky Opry. Middle Creek National Battlefield is the site of the largest and most significant Civil War battle in Eastern Kentucky.

Prestonsburg is home to the Samuel May House, the Big Sandy Valley's oldest known brick home. Built by Samuel May in 1817, the house was used by the Confederate forces as a recruiting station during the American Civil War. The 5th Kentucky Infantry CSA and 10th Kentucky Cavalry were organized there. The house was used as a residence until 1981 and was donated to the City of Prestonsburg in 1992. It has since been restored and maintained as a living history museum.

The Jenny Wiley Theatre was in Prestonsburg and offered theatrical productions all year long at both the outdoor Jenny Wiley Amphitheater, in Jenny Wiley State Resort Park, and the nearby Mountain Arts Center. The Theatre's presentations of classic Broadway musicals, comedies, historical dramas and holiday productions kept theatre-goers entertained for over 40 years.

Prestonsburg is also the home of the East Kentucky Science Center. Opened in 2004, the Science Center contains one of the nation's most technologically advanced planetariums.

== Geography ==
Prestonsburg is in northern Floyd County in the eastern part of the state, along the banks of the Levisa Fork of the Big Sandy River. It is 13 miles (21 km) south of Paintsville and 25 miles (40 km) northwest of Pikeville. According to the United States Census Bureau, Prestonsburg has an area of 12.9 square miles (33.4 km^{2}), of which 12.7 square miles (32.9 km^{2}) is land and 0.2 square miles (0.5 km^{2}), or 1.52%, is water.

=== Climate ===
Climate data for Prestonsburg, Kentucky
Month	Jan	Feb	Mar	Apr	May	Jun	Jul	Aug	Sep	Oct	Nov	Dec	Year
Record high °F (°C)	80 (27)	83 (28)	88 (31)	93 (34)	94 (34)	101 (38)	105 (41)	105 (41)	99 (37)	89 (32)	87 (31)	82 (28)	105 (41)
Mean daily maximum °F (°C)	44 (7)	49 (9)	60 (16)	70 (21)	78 (26)	86 (30)	89 (32)	88 (31)	81 (27)	71 (22)	59 (15)	48 (9)	69 (20)
Mean daily minimum °F (°C)	24 (−4)	26 (−3)	34 (1)	41 (5)	52 (11)	61 (16)	66 (19)	65 (18)	57 (14)	43 (6)	34 (1)	27 (−3)	44 (7)
Record low °F (°C)	−26 (−32)	−16 (−27)	−4 (−20)	20 (−7)	29 (−2)	36 (2)	46 (8)	47 (8)	35 (2)	21 (−6)	13 (−11)	−10 (−23)	−26 (−32)
Average precipitation inches (mm)	3.31 (84)	3.20 (81)	3.95 (100)	3.55 (90)	4.54 (115)	4.24 (108)	4.51 (115)	3.88 (99)	3.43 (87)	2.97 (75)	3.44 (87)	3.60 (91)	44.62 (1,133)
Source: The Weather Channel.

== Demographics ==
Historical population
Census	Pop.	Note	%±
1840	84		—
1870	179		—
1880	265		48.0%
1890	305		15.1%
1900	409		34.1%
1910	1,120		173.8%
1920	1,667		48.8%
1930	2,105		26.3%
1940	2,328		10.6%
1950	3,585		54.0%
1960	3,133		−12.6%
1970	3,422		9.2%
1980	4,011		17.2%
1990	3,558		−11.3%
2000	3,612		1.5%
2010	3,255		−9.9%
2020	3,681		13.1%
2024 (est.)	3,638		−1.2%
U.S. Decennial Census

=== 2020 census ===
As of the 2020 census, Prestonsburg had a population of 3,681. The median age was 42.7 years. 20.5% of residents were under the age of 18 and 21.5% of residents were 65 years of age or older. For every 100 females there were 87.2 males, and for every 100 females age 18 and over there were 83.2 males age 18 and over.

79.5% of residents lived in urban areas, while 20.5% lived in rural areas.

There were 1,609 households in Prestonsburg, of which 28.4% had children under the age of 18 living in them. Of all households, 38.3% were married-couple households, 20.2% were households with a male householder and no spouse or partner present, and 34.7% were households with a female householder and no spouse or partner present. About 37.7% of all households were made up of individuals and 16.9% had someone living alone who was 65 years of age or older.

There were 1,792 housing units, of which 10.2% were vacant. The homeowner vacancy rate was 2.0% and the rental vacancy rate was 6.0%.

Racial composition as of the 2020 census
Race	Number	Percent
White	3,530	95.9%
Black or African American	14	0.4%
American Indian and Alaska Native	2	0.1%
Asian	30	0.8%
Native Hawaiian and Other Pacific Islander	0	0.0%
Some other race	9	0.2%
Two or more races	96	2.6%
Hispanic or Latino (of any race)	55	1.5%

=== 2000 census ===
As of the census of 2000, there were 3,612 people, 1,563 households, and 956 families residing in the city. The population density was 332.2 inhabitants per square mile (128.3/km^{2}). There were 1,683 housing units at an average density of 154.8 units per square mile (59.8 units/km^{2}). The racial makeup of the city was 97.51% White, 0.33% African American, 0.50% Native American, 0.53% Asian, 0.44% from other races, and 0.69% from two or more races. Hispanic or Latino of any race were 1.02% of the population.

There were 1,563 households, out of which 26.4% had children under the age of 18 living with them, 43.4% were married couples living together, 14.5% had a female householder with no husband present, and 38.8% were non-families. 37.0% of all households were made up of individuals, and 17.0% had someone living alone who was 65 years of age or older. The average household size was 2.09 and the average family size was 2.72.

In the city, the population was spread out, with 20.2% under the age of 18, 9.2% from 18 to 24, 26.1% from 25 to 44, 23.9% from 45 to 64, and 20.5% who were 65 years of age or older. The median age was 41 years. For every 100 females, there were 83.1 males. For every 100 females age 18 and over, there were 80.8 males.

The median income for a household in the city was $20,810, and the median income for a family was $27,852. Males had a median income of $30,809 versus $22,439 for females. The per capita income for the city was $18,013. About 26.3% of families and 27.5% of the population were below the poverty line, including 44.2% of those under the age of 18 and 10.3% of those 65 and older.

== Education ==
Schools are managed by Floyd County Schools.

- Prestonsburg Elementary School
- James D. Adams Middle School
- Prestonsburg High School
- Big Sandy Community and Technical College

Prestonsburg has a public library, a branch of the Floyd County Public Library.

== Notable people ==
- Allison Ball, Kentucky State Treasurer
- Bert Combs, 50th Governor of Kentucky
- Boyd Holbrook, actor and fashion model
- Greg Stumbo, former speaker of the Kentucky House of Representatives
- Janet Stumbo, former Kentucky Supreme Court justice
- John W. Langley, former US Congressman
- Andrew J. May, former US Congressman
- Leslie Kendrick, dean, University of Virginia Law School
- Francis A. Hopkins, former US Congressman
- Green Haywood Hackworth, former judge, International Court of Justice

== See also ==
- Floyd County Chronicle & Times
- Big Sandy Area Development District
- East Kentucky Science Center
