= National Register of Historic Places listings in Magoffin County, Kentucky =

Location of Magoffin County in Kentucky

This is a list of the National Register of Historic Places listings in Magoffin County, Kentucky.

It is intended to be a complete list of the properties on the National Register of Historic Places in Magoffin County, Kentucky, United States. The locations of National Register properties for which the latitude and longitude coordinates are included below, may be seen in a map.

There are 3 properties listed on the National Register in the county.

This National Park Service list is complete through NPS recent listings posted June 6, 2026.

-

== Current listings ==
	Name on the Register	Image	Date listed	Location	City or town	Description
1	Gardner Farmstead		September 29, 2015 (#15000653)	Licking Station Rd. 37°44′42″N 83°04′50″W	Salyersville	
2	Judge D.W. Gardner House		March 28, 1979 (#79001021)	Kentucky Route 7; 37°44′40″N 83°04′06″W	Salyersville	
3	Salyersville Bank	Salyersville Bank	November 7, 1997 (#97001340)	Junction of W. Maple and N. Church Sts. 37°45′10″N 83°04′09″W	Salyersville	

== See also ==
- List of National Historic Landmarks in Kentucky
- National Register of Historic Places listings in Kentucky
