= Kentucky Route 7 =

State highway in Kentucky

Kentucky Route 7
- KY 7 highlighted in red

Route information
- Maintained by KYTC
- Length: 203.073 mi (326.814 km)

Major junctions
- South end: KY 15 in Jeff
- US 23 in South Shore; US 460 in West Liberty and Salyersville; Mountain Parkway in Salyersville; US 60 / KY 1 in Grayson; I-64 in Grayson
- North end: East First Avenue in South Shore

Location
- Country: United States
- State: Kentucky
- Counties: Perry, Letcher, Knott, Floyd, Magoffin, Morgan, Elliott, Carter, Greenup

Highway system
- Kentucky State Highway System; Interstate; US; State; Parkways
← KY 6	→ KY 8

Kentucky Route 7 (KY 7) is a 203.073-mile-long (326.814 km) state highway in the U.S. state of Kentucky.

== Route description ==
Kentucky Route 7 begins at a junction with KY 15 at Jeff in Perry County. The route continues through the cities of Blackey in Letcher County, Wayland in Floyd County, Salyersville in Magoffin County, West Liberty in Morgan County, Sandy Hook in Elliott County, Grayson in Carter County, and South Shore in Greenup County, where the route terminates at East First Avenue a short distance north of US 23.

== History ==
Beginning in the early 1960s, KY 7 was relocated near Bruin when a portion of the Little Sandy River was impounded to create Grayson Lake. To facilitate a growing number of recreational enthusiasts, KY 7 was reconstructed on a new two-lane alignment from the northern edge of the Grayson Lake recreational area to Grayson between 1965 and 1975.

The route between Salyersville and Grayson was designated a part of the London-Ashland Highway in the mid-1990s. The designation extends along KY 7 and KY 30 between Interstate 64 in Grayson to Interstate 75 in London. As such, much of KY 7 between the southern boundary of Grayson Lake to Sandy Hook has been upgraded or relocated to a new alignment. The new alignments feature a 60 mph (97 km/h) design speed, full 12-foot (3.7 m) shoulders, and 12-foot (3.7 m) travel lanes.

== Major intersections ==
County	Location	mi	km	Destinations	Notes
Perry	Jeff	0.000	0.000	KY 15 – Whitesburg, Hazard	Southern terminus
Perry	Jeff	0.397	0.639	KY 7 Conn. north	Road connecting KY 15 with northbound KY 7
Perry	Viper	2.534	4.078	KY 1165 south (Left Fork Maces Creek Road)	Northern terminus of KY 1165
Perry	Fusionia	7.425	11.949	KY 2447 east (Kodak-Fusionia Road)	Western terminus of KY 2447
Perry		9.999	16.092	KY 1165 north	Southern terminus of KY 1165
Perry		11.438	18.408	KY 699 west – Leatherwood Battlefield, Brashearville	Eastern terminus of KY 669
Letcher	Ulvah	14.705	23.665	KY 1103 south – Lilley Cornett Woods	Northern terminus of KY 1103
Letcher	Blackey	18.850	30.336	KY 3408 north	Southern terminus of KY 3408
Letcher	Blackey	19.467	31.329	KY 588 east	Western terminus of KY 588
Letcher	Letcher	20.649	33.231	KY 2036 south	Northern terminus of KY 2036
Letcher	Isom	27.067	43.560	KY 15 / KY 160 north – Hazard, Jackson	South end of KY 15/KY 160 overalp
Letcher	Isom	27.727	44.622	KY 15 / KY 160 south – Whitesburg, Jenkins	North end of KY 15/KY 160 overlap
Letcher		32.254	51.908	KY 931 south	Northern terminus of KY 931
Letcher	Colson	33.101	53.271	KY 1410 west	Eastern terminus of KY 1410
Letcher	Deane	38.795	62.435	KY 317 south – Fleming-Neon	Northern terminus of KY 317
Knott	Hall	43.624	70.206	KY 1498 north – Wheelwright	Southern terminus of KY 1498
Knott	Kite	46.593	74.984	KY 582 west	Eastern terminus of KY 582
Knott		52.720	84.845	KY 1091 east (Old House Branch Road)	Western terminus of KY 1091
Knott		57.183	92.027	KY 899 south – Alice Lloyd College	Northern terminus of KY 899
Floyd	Wayland	59.916	96.425	KY 1086 north	Southern terminus of KY 1086
Floyd	Lackey	62.606	100.755	KY 550 west	South end of KY 550 overlap
Floyd	Garrett	63.197	101.706	KY 777 north	South end of KY 777 overlap
Floyd	Garrett	63.466	102.139	KY 777 south	North end of KY 777 overlap
Floyd	Garrett	63.654	102.441	KY 80 Conn. to KY 80 – Hindman, Prestonsburg	
Floyd	Hueysville	65.163	104.870	KY 550 east	North end of KY 550 overlap
Floyd		67.983	109.408	KY 2029 south	Northern terminus of KY 2029
Magoffin		72.537	116.737	KY 3336 south	Northern terminus of KY 3336
Magoffin		78.231	125.901	KY 404 east (Howard Branch Road)	Western terminus of KY 404
Magoffin		79.314	127.644	KY 542 west	Eastern terminus of KY 542
Magoffin		83.327	134.102	KY 1734 east (Salt Lick Road)	Western terminus of KY 1734
Magoffin		85.402	137.441	KY 1766 north (Puncheon Creek Road)	Southern terminus of KY 1766
Magoffin	Swampton	86.310	138.902	KY 1471 south (Half Mountain Road)	Northern terminus of KY 1471
Magoffin	Royalton	88.331	142.155	KY 867 east	South end of KY 867 overlap
Magoffin	Sublett	89.063	143.333	KY 867 west	North end of KY 867 overlap
Magoffin		93.730	150.844	KY 1090 south (Lakeville Road)	Northern terminus of KY 1090
Magoffin	Salyersville	93.943– 94.038	151.187– 151.339	Mountain Parkway – Campton, Prestonsburg, Lexington	Interchange; Mountain Parkway exit 75
Magoffin	Salyersville	95.110	153.065	US 460 east (Parkway Drive) to KY 114 – Burning Fork, Staffordsville, Paintsville	South end of US 460 concurrency
Magoffin	Salyersville	95.413	153.552	KY 40 east (Maple Street) – Falcon	Western terminus of KY 40
Magoffin		96.716	155.649	KY 30 west – Jackson	Eastern terminus of KY 30
Magoffin		97.631	157.122	KY 2019 north (Elk Creek Road)	Southern terminus of KY 2019
Magoffin		102.036	164.211	KY 134 west – Adale	Eastern terminus of KY 134
Magoffin	Edna	102.872	165.556	KY 1081 west	South end of KY 1081 overlap
Magoffin	Wonnie	104.666	168.444	KY 1081 east	North end of KY 1081 overlap
Morgan		107.728	173.371	KY 1081 east	Western terminus of KY 1081
Morgan		108.939	175.320	KY 1000 south – Caney	Northern terminus of KY 1000
Morgan		111.580	179.571	KY 364 south	Northern terminus of KY 364
Morgan	West Liberty	118.562	190.807	KY 172 east – Crocker, Patoker Branch, Fairgrounds	Western terminus of KY 172
Morgan	West Liberty	118.682	191.000	Dogwood Lane (KY 2499 south) – West Liberty Airport	
Morgan	West Liberty	118.951	191.433	Glenn Avenue (KY 2494 west)	
Morgan	West Liberty	119.481	192.286	Broadway Street (KY 2495 south)	
Morgan	West Liberty	119.543	192.386	US 460 west (Main Street) – Frenchburg	North end of US 460 concurrency
Morgan		121.033	194.784	KY 519 north – Morehead	Southern terminus of KY 519
Morgan	Pomp	122.066	196.446	KY 1161 east	Western terminus of KY 1161
Morgan	Wrigley	126.253	203.185	KY 711	
Elliott		131.612	211.809	KY 173 north – Morehead	Southern terminus of KY 173
Elliott	Little Sandy	132.609	213.413	KY 702 south	Northern terminus of KY 702
Elliott	Faye	133.715	215.193	KY 650 north (Doctors Branch Road)	South end of KY 650 overlap
Elliott	Faye	134.174	215.932	KY 650 south (Welles Creek Road)	North end of KY 650 overlap
Elliott	Sandy Hook	136.530	219.724	KY 556 west (North Ruin Road)	Eastern terminus of KY 556
Elliott	Sandy Hook	136.660	219.933	KY 32 east (Brown Ridge Road) – Louisa	South end of KY 32 overlap
Elliott	Sandy Hook	136.901	220.321	Kentucky Avenue (KY 2526 north)	
Elliott	Sandy Hook	136.982	220.451	Kentucky Avenue (KY 2526 south)	
Elliott	Sandy Hook	138.210	222.427	KY 557 west (Fannin Road)	Eastern terminus of KY 557
Elliott	Newfoundland	140.396	225.945	KY 32 west (Brown Ridge Road) – Morehead	North end of KY 32 overlap
Elliott	Green	141.923	228.403	KY 504 west / Prison Road – Little Sandy Correctional Complex	Eastern terminus of KY 504; prison directly to the east
Elliott		142.308– 142.466	229.023– 229.277	Bridge over the Little Sandy River	
Elliott		142.519	229.362	KY 706 south	Northern terminus of KY 706
Elliott		142.900	229.975	KY 885 north (Bear Flats Road)	Southern terminus of KY 885
Elliott		145.789	234.625	KY 409 south (Bruin Road)	Northern terminus of KY 409
Elliott		147.519	237.409	KY 3353 south (Horton Flats Road)	Northern terminus of KY 3353
Carter		148.509	239.002	Grayson Lake State Park	
Carter		149.391	240.422	KY 986 west	Eastern terminus of KY 986
Carter		150.949	242.929	KY 3295 west (Rattlesnake Ridge Road)	Eastern terminus of KY 3295
Carter		152.756	245.837	KY 1496 east – Grayson Lake Wildlife Management Area	Western terminus of KY 1496
Carter		153.880	247.646	KY 1444 north (Mayhew Flats Road)	Southern terminus of KY 1444
Carter		153.995	247.831	KY 1661 north	Southern terminus of KY 1661
Carter		157.124	252.867	KY 1661 south	Northern terminus of KY 1661
Carter	Grayson	157.656	253.723	KY 773 east	Western terminus of KY 773
Carter	Grayson	158.832	255.615	US 60 / KY 1 south – Olive Hill, Hitchins, Ashland	South end of KY 1 concurrency; US 60 both ways, KY 1 to the east
Carter	Grayson	159.345	256.441	Academic Parkway – Kentucky Christian University	
Carter	Grayson	160.358– 160.526	258.071– 258.342	I-64 – Ashland, Lexington	Interchange; I-64 exit 172
Carter	Grayson	160.624	258.499	KY 1947 west	Eastern terminus of KY 1947
Carter		160.887	258.923	AA Hwy (KY 9) north – Vanceburg, Maysville	Southern terminus of the AA Highway/KY 9
Carter	Pactolus	161.682	260.202	KY 1 north	North end of KY 1 concurrency
Carter		162.127	260.918	KY 1959 south	Northern terminus of KY 1959
Carter		166.605	268.125	AA Hwy (KY 9) south – Grayson	South end of KY 9/AA Highway concurrency
Carter		167.617	269.753	AA Hwy (KY 9) north – Vanceburg, Maysville	North end of KY 9/AA Highway concurrency
Carter	Gesling	172.252	277.213	KY 2 west – Carter	South end of KY 2 concurrency
Carter		175.503	282.445	AA Hwy (KY 9) – Grayson, Vanceburg, Maysville	
Carter		175.932	283.135	KY 1773 west	Eastern terminus of KY 1773
Greenup	Kehoe	176.973	284.810	KY 784 (Lost Creek Road/Three Prong Road)	
Greenup		182.988	294.491	KY 2 east – Greenup	North end of KY 2 concurrency
Greenup		188.551	303.443	KY 2070 west (Big White Oak Road)	Eastern terminus of KY 2070
Greenup	Lynn	190.257	306.189	KY 827 east (Coal Branch Road) – Greenup	Western terminus of KY 827
Greenup		193.649	311.648	AA Hwy (KY 10) – Maysville, Vanceburg, Greenup	
Greenup		198.628	319.661	KY 3308 west	Eastern terminus of KY 3308
Greenup	Sunshine	201.830	324.814	KY 784 south (White Oak Road)	Northern terminus of KY 784
Greenup	South Shore	202.730	326.262	KY 2540 west (SM Roberson Drive)	Eastern terminus of KY 2540
Greenup	South Shore	203.040	326.761	US 23 – Portsmouth, Ohio, Lloyd, Greenup	
Greenup	South Shore	203.073	326.814	5th Avenue / South Shore Drive	Northern terminus of KY 7; road continues north as Main Street for approximately 0.3 miles before ending
1.000 mi = 1.609 km; 1.000 km = 0.621 mi: Concurrency terminus
