= 2008 United States presidential election in Kentucky =

- November 4, 2008
- Turnout: 64.04%▼

Nominee	John McCain	Barack Obama
Party	Republican	Democratic
Home state	Arizona	Illinois
Running mate	Sarah Palin	Joe Biden
Electoral vote	8	0
Popular vote	1,048,462	751,985
Percentage	57.37%	41.15%

McCain
40–50%
50–60%
60–70%
70–80%
80–90%
90–100%
Obama
40–50%
50–60%
60–70%
70–80%
80–90%
90–100%
Tie/No Data
President before election
George W. Bush
Republican
Elected President
Barack Obama
Democratic

The 2008 United States presidential election in Kentucky took place on November 4, 2008, and was part of the 2008 United States presidential election. Voters in Kentucky chose eight representatives to the Electoral College, or electors, who voted for president and vice president.

Kentucky was won by Republican nominee John McCain by a 16.22% margin of victory with 57.40% of the vote. Prior to the election, all seventeen news organizations considered it a state McCain would win, or otherwise a red state. Hillary Clinton had led McCain in hypothetical polls of the state during the Democratic primaries, but once Barack Obama secured the Democratic nomination Kentucky was reclassified as safe for the GOP. Obama did, however, improve on John Kerry's performance by two points. This was the first time since 1960 that Kentucky did not vote for the winning candidate in a presidential election.

This was the first time ever that Floyd County or Knott County voted for the Republican candidate, and the first time since 1908 that Breathitt County voted for the Republican candidate. Obama became the first Democrat ever to win the presidency without carrying numerous historically Democratic counties in the state, primarily in the Eastern Coalfield, Bluegrass, and Jackson Purchase regions. As of 2024, this remains the last time that a Democratic presidential nominee has won over 40% of the vote in Kentucky, and the last election in which Rowan County, Hancock County, Menifee County, Wolfe County, or Henderson County voted for the Democratic candidate.

== Primaries ==
- 2008 Kentucky Democratic presidential primary
- 2008 Kentucky Republican presidential primary

== Campaign ==
=== Predictions ===
Sixteen news organizations made state-by-state predictions of the election. Their last predictions before election day were:

Source	Ranking
D.C. Political Report	Likely R
Cook Political Report	Solid R
The Takeaway	Solid R
Electoral-vote.com	Solid R
Washington Post	Solid R
Politico	Solid R
RealClearPolitics	Solid R
FiveThirtyEight	Solid R
CQ Politics	Solid R
The New York Times	Solid R
CNN	Safe R
NPR	Solid R
MSNBC	Solid R
Fox News	Likely R
Associated Press	Likely R
Rasmussen Reports	Safe R

=== Polling ===
McCain won every pre-election poll against Obama, almost all of them by a double-digit margin and with at least 49% of the vote. The final three polls averaged McCain leading 56% to 41%.

=== Fundraising ===
John McCain raised a total of $1,220,017. Barack Obama raised $2,394,198.

=== Advertising and visits ===
Obama spent $183,738, while a conservative interest group spent just $212. Each ticket visited the state once.

== Analysis ==
Since 1964, Kentucky has only gone Democratic three times--Jimmy Carter in 1976 and Bill Clinton in 1992 and 1996, both of whom were White Southerners, whereas Obama was an African American "big-city liberal" from Chicago. (Similar socio-cultural dynamics existed in other Southern and Appalachian states with a large ancestral Democratic base, such as Tennessee, West Virginia, and Arkansas.)

In the 2008 primary, exit polls conducted found that 30 percent of Clinton supporters opted not to vote for Obama in the general election, 40% would vote McCain and the rest would support Obama in the general election. Several counties in the southeastern part of the state swung Republican and went to McCain as solidly Democratic Floyd and Knott counties voted Republican for the first time ever, and Breathitt County voted Republican for the first time since 1908. Obama decided to not spend campaign funds on Kentucky and instead went to more viable battleground states like North Carolina and Indiana instead. McCain won Kentucky by a margin of 16.22 points on election day and performed slightly worse than George Bush in 2004. Obama improved upon Kerry's performance in big cities and urban areas while McCain improved upon Bush in rural areas. Kentucky was the first state called for either candidate.

At the same time, incumbent Republican U.S. Senator Mitch McConnell, who also served as Senate Minority Leader at the time, was just narrowly reelected with 52.97% of the vote to Democrat Bruce Lunsford's 47.03%. Republicans also held onto an open seat vacated by Ron Lewis in Kentucky's 2nd Congressional District. At the state level, however, Democrats picked up two seats in the Kentucky House of Representatives.

== Results ==
United States presidential election in Kentucky, 2008
Party	Candidate	Running mate	Votes	Percentage	Electoral votes
Republican	John McCain	Sarah Palin	1,048,462	57.40%	8
Democratic	Barack Obama	Joe Biden	751,985	41.17%	0
Independent	Ralph Nader	Matt Gonzalez	15,378	0.84%	0
Libertarian	Bob Barr	Wayne Allyn Root	5,989	0.33%	0
Constitution	Chuck Baldwin	Darrell Castle	4,694	0.26%	0
Totals			1,826,508	100.00%	8
Voter turnout (Voting age population)					57.5%

=== By county ===
County	John McCain Republican		Barack Obama Democratic		Various candidates Other parties		Margin		Total
County	#	%	#	%	#	%	#	%	Total
Adair	5,512	75.53%	1,668	22.86%	118	1.61%	3,844	52.67%	7,298
Allen	5,258	71.15%	2,024	27.39%	108	1.46%	3,234	43.76%	7,390
Anderson	6,885	65.25%	3,462	32.81%	205	1.94%	3,423	32.44%	10,552
Ballard	2,537	62.49%	1,427	35.15%	96	2.36%	1,110	27.34%	4,060
Barren	11,133	66.24%	5,434	32.33%	240	1.43%	5,699	33.91%	16,807
Bath	2,234	49.17%	2,210	48.65%	99	2.18%	24	0.52%	4,543
Bell	6,681	69.61%	2,782	28.99%	135	1.41%	3,899	40.62%	9,598
Boone	33,812	66.59%	16,292	32.09%	670	1.32%	17,520	34.50%	50,774
Bourbon	4,820	57.86%	3,385	40.64%	125	1.50%	1,435	17.22%	8,330
Boyd	11,430	55.30%	8,886	42.99%	354	1.71%	2,544	12.31%	20,670
Boyle	7,701	60.95%	4,769	37.74%	165	1.30%	2,932	23.21%	12,635
Bracken	2,066	60.78%	1,241	36.51%	92	2.71%	825	24.27%	3,399
Breathitt	2,671	53.10%	2,205	43.84%	154	3.06%	466	9.26%	5,030
Breckinridge	5,281	61.97%	3,110	36.49%	131	1.54%	2,171	25.48%	8,522
Bullitt	20,102	65.42%	10,177	33.12%	447	1.45%	9,925	32.30%	30,726
Butler	3,696	69.64%	1,555	29.30%	56	1.06%	2,141	40.34%	5,307
Caldwell	3,866	62.36%	2,212	35.68%	121	1.95%	1,654	26.68%	6,199
Calloway	8,991	58.37%	6,165	40.02%	248	1.61%	2,826	18.35%	15,404
Campbell	24,046	59.67%	15,622	38.77%	629	1.56%	8,424	20.90%	40,297
Carlisle	1,699	64.92%	879	33.59%	39	1.49%	820	31.33%	2,617
Carroll	2,032	52.99%	1,716	44.75%	87	2.27%	316	8.24%	3,835
Carter	5,252	53.52%	4,316	43.98%	245	2.50%	936	9.54%	9,813
Casey	4,679	78.55%	1,219	20.46%	59	0.99%	3,460	58.09%	5,957
Christian	13,699	60.14%	8,880	38.98%	199	0.87%	4,819	21.16%	22,778
Clark	9,664	61.84%	5,749	36.79%	215	1.38%	3,915	25.05%	15,628
Clay	5,710	77.54%	1,552	21.08%	102	1.38%	4,158	56.46%	7,364
Clinton	3,366	80.68%	761	18.24%	45	1.08%	2,605	62.44%	4,172
Crittenden	2,604	66.26%	1,254	31.91%	72	1.83%	1,350	34.35%	3,930
Cumberland	2,056	73.51%	697	24.92%	44	1.57%	1,359	48.59%	2,797
Daviess	23,692	54.31%	19,282	44.20%	648	1.49%	4,410	10.11%	43,622
Edmonson	3,562	67.59%	1,652	31.35%	56	1.06%	1,910	36.24%	5,270
Elliott	902	35.86%	1,535	61.03%	78	3.11%	-633	-25.17%	2,515
Estill	3,685	69.35%	1,555	29.26%	74	1.39%	2,130	40.09%	5,314
Fayette	59,884	46.91%	66,042	51.74%	1,722	1.36%	-6,158	-4.83%	127,648
Fleming	3,432	58.85%	2,279	39.08%	121	2.07%	1,153	19.77%	5,832
Floyd	7,741	49.43%	7,530	48.09%	388	2.48%	211	1.34%	15,659
Franklin	11,911	49.47%	11,767	48.87%	401	1.67%	144	0.60%	24,079
Fulton	1,530	54.16%	1,238	43.82%	57	2.02%	292	10.34%	2,825
Gallatin	1,840	57.63%	1,278	40.03%	75	2.35%	562	17.60%	3,193
Garrard	5,118	70.98%	2,012	27.91%	80	1.11%	3,106	43.07%	7,210
Grant	5,510	62.94%	3,112	35.55%	132	1.50%	2,398	27.39%	8,754
Graves	10,056	62.25%	5,843	36.17%	256	1.58%	4,213	26.08%	16,155
Grayson	6,605	66.70%	3,154	31.85%	144	1.45%	3,451	34.85%	9,903
Green	3,785	74.52%	1,204	23.71%	90	1.77%	2,581	50.81%	5,079
Greenup	8,849	56.01%	6,621	41.91%	328	2.08%	2,228	14.10%	15,798
Hancock	1,928	46.53%	2,135	51.52%	81	1.95%	-207	-4.99%	4,144
Hardin	23,896	59.75%	15,650	39.13%	444	1.11%	8,246	20.62%	39,990
Harlan	7,165	72.27%	2,586	26.08%	163	1.64%	4,579	46.19%	9,914
Harrison	4,520	59.55%	2,916	38.42%	154	2.03%	1,604	21.13%	7,590
Hart	4,397	64.49%	2,290	33.59%	131	1.92%	2,107	30.90%	6,818
Henderson	9,523	47.95%	10,049	50.60%	289	1.46%	-526	-2.65%	19,861
Henry	4,081	58.98%	2,725	39.38%	113	1.63%	1,356	19.60%	6,919
Hickman	1,406	62.49%	812	36.09%	32	1.42%	594	26.40%	2,250
Hopkins	11,916	61.59%	7,104	36.72%	328	1.70%	4,812	24.87%	19,348
Jackson	4,407	84.36%	743	14.22%	74	1.42%	3,664	70.14%	5,224
Jefferson	153,957	43.38%	196,435	55.34%	4,544	1.28%	-42,478	-11.96%	354,936
Jessamine	13,711	67.83%	6,236	30.85%	267	1.32%	7,475	36.98%	20,214
Johnson	5,948	69.84%	2,407	28.26%	162	1.90%	3,541	41.58%	8,517
Kenton	40,714	59.69%	26,480	38.82%	1,019	1.49%	14,234	20.87%	68,213
Knott	3,070	52.75%	2,612	44.88%	138	2.37%	458	7.87%	5,820
Knox	8,150	71.56%	3,074	26.99%	165	1.61%	5,076	44.57%	11,389
LaRue	4,153	67.22%	1,913	30.96%	112	1.81%	2,240	36.26%	6,178
Laurel	17,660	78.49%	4,618	20.52%	222	0.99%	13,042	57.97%	22,500
Lawrence	3,503	62.01%	2,036	36.04%	110	1.95%	1,467	25.97%	5,649
Lee	1,978	71.33%	752	27.12%	43	1.55%	1,226	44.21%	2,773
Leslie	3,574	81.28%	766	17.42%	57	1.30%	2,808	63.86%	4,397
Letcher	5,367	65.17%	2,623	31.85%	245	2.98%	2,744	33.32%	8,235
Lewis	3,213	67.06%	1,510	31.52%	68	1.42%	1,703	35.54%	4,791
Lincoln	6,273	68.55%	2,752	30.07%	126	1.38%	3,521	38.48%	9,151
Livingston	2,890	62.92%	1,622	35.31%	81	1.77%	1,268	27.61%	4,593
Logan	6,925	63.59%	3,811	35.00%	154	1.41%	3,114	28.59%	10,890
Lyon	2,220	57.59%	1,577	40.91%	58	1.50%	643	16.68%	3,855
McCracken	19,043	61.92%	11,285	36.69%	426	1.39%	7,758	25.23%	30,754
McCreary	4,078	75.42%	1,258	23.27%	71	1.33%	2,820	52.15%	5,407
McLean	2,386	53.96%	1,963	44.39%	73	1.65%	423	9.57%	4,422
Madison	19,694	60.53%	12,392	38.09%	451	1.38%	7,302	22.44%	32,537
Magoffin	2,434	52.33%	2,105	45.26%	112	2.41%	329	7.07%	4,651
Marion	3,842	50.45%	3,596	47.22%	177	2.32%	246	3.23%	7,615
Marshall	9,512	61.42%	5,683	36.70%	292	1.88%	3,829	24.72%	15,487
Martin	2,824	76.49%	808	21.89%	60	1.62%	2,016	54.60%	3,692
Mason	4,102	57.60%	2,891	40.60%	128	1.80%	1,310	17.00%	7,121
Meade	6,691	59.71%	4,343	38.76%	172	1.53%	2,348	20.95%	11,206
Menifee	1,155	46.40%	1,276	51.27%	58	2.33%	-121	-4.87%	2,489
Mercer	6,781	67.41%	3,159	31.40%	120	1.19%	3,622	36.01%	10,060
Metcalfe	2,734	65.11%	1,350	32.15%	115	2.74%	1,384	32.96%	4,199
Monroe	3,537	75.82%	1,067	22.87%	61	1.31%	2,470	52.95%	4,665
Montgomery	5,947	57.56%	4,234	40.98%	150	1.45%	1,713	16.58%	10,331
Morgan	2,396	54.72%	1,879	42.91%	104	2.37%	517	11.81%	4,379
Muhlenberg	6,447	50.02%	6,221	48.27%	221	1.71%	226	1.75%	12,889
Nelson	10,139	55.87%	7,654	42.18%	353	1.95%	2,485	13.69%	18,146
Nicholas	1,634	55.02%	1,272	42.83%	64	2.15%	362	12.19%	2,970
Ohio	5,687	57.22%	4,059	40.84%	192	1.94%	3,844	16.38%	9,938
Oldham	18,997	64.80%	10,000	34.11%	319	1.09%	8,997	30.69%	29,316
Owen	2,969	62.49%	1,694	35.66%	88	1.85%	1,275	26.83%	4,751
Owsley	1,279	75.86%	381	22.60%	26	1.54%	898	53.26%	1,686
Pendleton	3,676	63.36%	2,027	34.94%	99	1.70%	1,649	28.42%	5,802
Perry	6,762	65.18%	3,444	33.20%	169	1.62%	3,318	31.98%	10,375
Pike	12,655	55.89%	9,525	42.07%	463	2.04%	3,130	13.82%	22,643
Powell	2,837	57.06%	2,065	41.53%	70	1.41%	772	15.53%	4,972
Pulaski	19,862	77.09%	5,590	21.70%	314	1.21%	14,272	55.39%	25,766
Robertson	533	52.51%	451	44.43%	31	3.05%	82	8.08%	1,015
Rockcastle	4,757	75.82%	1,410	22.47%	107	1.71%	3,347	53.35%	6,274
Rowan	3,907	47.92%	4,074	49.96%	173	2.12%	-167	-2.04%	8,154
Russell	5,779	77.31%	1,569	20.99%	127	1.70%	4,210	56.32%	7,475
Scott	11,782	59.72%	7,712	39.09%	236	1.19%	4,070	20.63%	19,730
Shelby	11,451	61.76%	6,871	37.06%	218	1.18%	4,580	24.70%	18,540
Simpson	4,437	60.71%	2,775	37.97%	97	1.32%	1,662	22.74%	7,309
Spencer	5,378	66.82%	2,519	31.30%	152	1.88%	2,859	35.52%	8,049
Taylor	7,568	69.69%	3,165	29.14%	127	1.17%	4,403	40.55%	10,860
Todd	3,336	67.52%	1,543	31.23%	62	1.25%	1,793	36.29%	4,941
Trigg	4,189	64.18%	2,246	34.41%	92	1.41%	1,943	29.77%	6,527
Trimble	2,239	58.74%	1,484	38.93%	89	2.33%	755	19.81%	3,812
Union	3,120	51.71%	2,804	46.47%	110	1.82%	316	5.24%	6,034
Warren	25,993	58.88%	17,669	40.02%	483	1.10%	8,324	18.86%	44,145
Washington	3,305	62.65%	1,890	35.83%	80	1.52%	1,415	26.82%	5,275
Wayne	4,868	67.65%	2,201	30.59%	127	1.76%	2,667	37.06%	7,196
Webster	3,037	54.82%	2,390	43.14%	113	2.04%	647	11.68%	5,540
Whitley	10,015	73.08%	3,484	25.42%	205	1.50%	6,531	47.66%	13,704
Wolfe	1,408	47.44%	1,493	50.30%	67	2.26%	-85	-2.86%	2,968
Woodford	7,130	57.98%	5,027	40.88%	140	1.14%	2,103	17.10%	12,297
Totals	1,048,462	57.37%	751,985	41.15%	27,140	1.49%	296,477	16.22%	1,827,587

Counties that flipped from Republican to Democratic

- Fayette (largest municipality: Lexington)
- Hancock (largest municipality: Hawesville)
- Henderson (largest municipality: Henderson)

Counties that flipped from Democratic to Republican

- Bath (largest municipality: Owingsville)
- Breathitt (largest municipality: Jackson)
- Carter (largest municipality: Grayson)
- Floyd (largest municipality: Prestonburg)
- Knott (largest municipality: Hindman)
- Magoffin (largest municipality: Salyersville)
- Pike (largest municipality: Pikeville)

=== By congressional district ===
McCain carried five of the state's six congressional districts, including one held by a Democrat.

District	McCain	Obama	Representative
1st	61.85%	36.60%	Ed Whitfield
2nd	60.54%	38.03%	Ron Lewis (110th Congress)
2nd	60.54%	38.03%	Brett Guthrie (111th Congress)
3rd	43.36%	55.66%	John Yarmuth
4th	60.41%	37.96%	Geoff Davis
5th	67.01%	31.24%	Hal Rogers
6th	55.41%	43.22%	Ben Chandler

== Electors ==
Technically the voters of Kentucky cast their ballots for electors: representatives to the Electoral College. Kentucky was allocated eight electors because it had six congressional districts and two senators. All candidates who appear on the ballot or qualify to receive write-in votes must submit a list of eight electors, who pledge to vote for their candidate and his or her running mate. Whoever wins the majority of votes in the state is awarded all eight electoral votes. Their chosen electors then vote for president and vice president. Although electors are pledged to their candidate and running mate, they are not obligated to vote for them; an elector who votes for someone other than his or her candidate is known as a faithless elector.

The electors of each state and the District of Columbia met on December 15, 2008, to cast their votes for president and vice president. The Electoral College itself never meets as one body. Instead the electors from each state and the District of Columbia met in their respective capitols.

The following were the members of the Electoral College from Kentucky. All eight were pledged to and voted for John McCain and Sarah Palin:

1. James Henry Snider
2. Walter A. Baker
3. Edna M. Fulkerson
4. Amy B. Towles
5. Nancy Mitchell
6. Don Ball
7. Robert Gable
8. Elizabeth G. Thomas
