= Ivyton, Kentucky =

Unincorporated community in Kentucky, United States

- Unincorporated community
- Location within Kentucky Location within the United States
- Coordinates: 37°42′32″N 82°58′43″W
- Country: United States
- State: Kentucky
- County: Magoffin
- Elevation: 984 ft (300 m)
- Time zone: UTC-5 (Eastern (EST))
  - Summer (DST): UTC-4 (EDT)
- GNIS feature ID: 508324

Ivyton is an unincorporated community in Magoffin County, Kentucky, United States. It lies along Route 114 southeast of the city of Salyersville, the county seat of Magoffin County. Its elevation is 984 feet (300 m).

A post office was established in the community in 1883. The town was named for the natural abundance of ivy.
