= Mason, Magoffin County, Kentucky =

Unincorporated community in Kentucky, United States

Mason, Kentucky
- Unincorporated community
- Location within Kentucky Location within the United States
- Coordinates: 37°43′14″N 83°03′00″W
- Country: United States
- State: Kentucky
- County: Magoffin
- Elevation: 883 ft (269 m)
- Time zone: UTC-5 (Eastern (EST))
  - Summer (DST): UTC-4 (EDT)
- Area code: 606
- GNIS feature ID: 508554

Mason is an unincorporated community in Magoffin County, Kentucky, United States. The community is located along Kentucky Route 7 2.4 miles (3.9 km) south-southeast of Salyersville.
