= Flat Fork =

Flat Fork or Flatfork may refer to:

- Flat Fork, Kentucky, an unincorporated community
- Flat Fork (Brown Creek tributary), a stream in Anson County, North Carolina
- Flatfork, West Virginia, an unincorporated community
- Flatfork fern, a type of fern
