= Marshallville =

Marshallville is the name of several places in the United States:

- Marshallville, Georgia
- Marshallville, Kentucky
- Marshallville, New Jersey
- Marshallville, Ohio
