= Royalton, Kentucky =

Unincorporated community in Kentucky, United States

- Unincorporated community
- Location within Kentucky Location within the United States
- Coordinates: 37°40′30″N 83°1′19″W
- Country: United States
- State: Kentucky
- County: Magoffin
- Elevation: 879 ft (268 m)
- Time zone: UTC-5 (Eastern (EST))
  - Summer (DST): UTC-4 (EDT)
- ZIP codes: 41464
- Area code: 606
- GNIS feature ID: 502439

Royalton is an unincorporated community in Magoffin County, Kentucky, United States. It lies along Route 7 southeast of the city of Salyersville, the county seat of Magoffin County. Its elevation is 879 feet (268 m). Although it is unincorporated it had a post office, with the ZIP code 41464.

== History ==
Royalton was established as a company town by the Dawkins Lumber Company of Ashland Kentucky who opened a mill there on August 1, 1920. They were financed by the Royal Bank of Canada for which the town is named.

The lumber company established a railroad, the Dawkins Line, in order to transport lumber. After the lumber industry left the coal industry became big in Royalton. A coal tipple was built and the railroad was put to use by the Chesapeake and Ohio Railway in 1930 and later by CSX. The coal industry has since moved on and the Dawkins Line was sold to R.J. Corman in 2002 and abandoned in 2004. After the rail corridor was abandoned, the former railroad right-of-way was converted to the Dawkins Line Rail Trail, which opened in 2013.

The Royalton post office was established on September 20, 1920. In 2011 the post office was closed, one of several thousand being eliminated by the US Postal Service across the country in an effort to save revenue.
