= Swampton, Kentucky =

Unincorporated community in Kentucky, United States

- Unincorporated community
- Location within Kentucky Location within the United States
- Coordinates: 37°39′31″N 83°0′41″W
- Country: United States
- State: Kentucky
- County: Magoffin
- Elevation: 919 ft (280 m)
- Time zone: UTC-5 (Eastern (EST))
  - Summer (DST): UTC-4 (EDT)
- GNIS feature ID: 509170

Swampton is an unincorporated community in Magoffin County, Kentucky, United States. It lies along Route 7 southeast of the city of Salyersville, the county seat of Magoffin County. Its elevation is 919 feet (280 m).
