= Plutarch (disambiguation) =

Plutarch of Chaeronea (c. 46–120) was a Greek historian, biographer, essayist, and Middle Platonist.

Plutarch may also refer to the following people:

- Plutarch of Alexandria, an ancient Greek grammarian and deipnosophist
- Plutarch of Athens (circa 350-430), Greek philosopher and Neoplatonist
- Plutarch of Byzantium (1st century), Bishop of Byzantium
- Plutarch of Eretria (4th century BC), tyrant of Eretria
- Plutarch Heavensbee, a character in The Hunger Games series
- Saint Plutarch (died 202 AD), Egyptian martyr

== Places ==
- Plutarch (crater), a lunar impact crater
- Plutarch, Kentucky, an unincorporated community in Magoffin County
