= Wheelersburg, Kentucky =

Unincorporated community in Kentucky, United States

- Unincorporated community
- Location within Kentucky Location within the United States
- Coordinates: 37°49′36″N 83°0′40″W
- Country: United States
- State: Kentucky
- County: Magoffin
- Elevation: 853 ft (260 m)
- Time zone: UTC-5 (Eastern (EST))
  - Summer (DST): UTC-4 (EDT)
- GNIS feature ID: 509351

Wheelersburg is an unincorporated community in Magoffin County, Kentucky, United States. It lies along Route 1081 northeast of the city of Salyersville, the county seat of Magoffin County. Its elevation is 853 feet (260 m).
