= Judge D.W. Gardner House =

Historic house in Kentucky, United States

- Judge D. W. Gardner House
- U.S. National Register of Historic Places
- Location within Kentucky Location within the United States
- Location: Kentucky Route 7, Salyersville, Kentucky
- Coordinates: 37°44′40″N 83°04′06″W
- Area: 5 acres (2.0 ha)
- Built: 1885, c.1900
- NRHP reference No.: 79001021
- Added to NRHP: March 28, 1979

The Judge D. W. Gardner House, located on Kentucky Route 7 in Salyersville, Kentucky, was built in 1885. It has also been known as Greencrest. It was listed on the National Register of Historic Places in 1979.

It is a two-story, weatherboard house set back about 400 feet (120 m) from the road on a small rise, within a stone wall. It has "restrained ornamentation". It has single-story porches, added in about 1900.

The nomination form for the house for the National Register of Historic Places describes it as a "well-known local landmark rich in local tradition and heritage, because for over twenty years it served as the home of the state's circuit judge for several counties in this area. It attains added significance in being one of the few remaining older buildings in Salyersville."
