= Duco (disambiguation) =

Duco may refer to:

- Duco, a brand of automotive lacquer created by the DuPont Company
- Duco, Kentucky, a community in Magoffin County
- Duco Boxing, boxing promotion company in New Zealand
- Mike Duco, a Canadian hockey player
