= Foraker, Kentucky =

Unincorporated community in Kentucky, United States

- Unincorporated community
- Location within Kentucky Location within the United States
- Coordinates: 37°39′36″N 83°8′14″W
- Country: United States
- State: Kentucky
- County: Magoffin
- Elevation: 892 ft (272 m)
- Time zone: UTC-5 (Eastern (EST))
  - Summer (DST): UTC-4 (EDT)
- GNIS feature ID: 508021

Foraker is an unincorporated community in Magoffin County, Kentucky, United States. It lies along Kentucky Route 30 south of the city of Salyersville, the county seat of Magoffin County. Its elevation is 892 feet (272 m).
