= Gunlock =

Gunlock may refer to:

== Firearms ==
- Gunlock, a flintlock mechanism fitted to a cannon, that fires it when a cord is pulled
- Gunlock or gun lock, another name for a trigger lock, a device for securing firearms

== Geography ==
- Gunlock, Kentucky, United States
- Gunlock, Utah, United States
- Gunlock State Park, Utah

== Video games ==
- RayForce, a 1993 arcade game by Taito titled Gunlock in European arcades

== Comics ==
- Saiyuki (manga), Saiyuki Reload Gunlock
