= Gunlock, Kentucky =

Unincorporated community in Kentucky, United States

- Unincorporated community
- Location within Kentucky Location within the United States
- Coordinates: 37°32′51″N 82°55′34″W
- Country: United States
- State: Kentucky
- County: Magoffin
- Elevation: 1,001 ft (305 m)
- Time zone: UTC-5 (Eastern (EST))
  - Summer (DST): UTC-4 (EDT)
- ZIP codes: 41632
- GNIS feature ID: 508149

Gunlock is an unincorporated community in Magoffin County, Kentucky, United States. It lies along Route 7 southeast of the city of Salyersville, the county seat of Magoffin County. Its elevation is 1,001 feet (305 m).

A post office was established in the community in 1936. The first postmaster is said to have taken the name Gunlock from a newspaper article he read about a western ranch. Its post office, with the ZIP code of 41632, closed in 1998.
