= Kentucky Route 404 =

State highway in Kentucky, United States

Kentucky Route 404
- KY 404 highlighted in red

Route information
- Maintained by KYTC
- Length: 10.848 mi (17.458 km)

Major junctions
- West end: KY 7 southeast of Arthurmabel
- KY 850 in Goodloe
- East end: KY 114 in Prestonsburg

Location
- Country: United States
- State: Kentucky
- Counties: Magoffin, Floyd

Highway system
- Kentucky State Highway System; Interstate; US; State; Parkways
← KY 403	→ KY 405

Kentucky Route 404 (KY 404) is a 10.848-mile-long (17.458 km) state highway in the U.S. state of Kentucky. The highway connects mostly rural areas of Magoffin and Floyd counties with Prestonsburg.

== Route description ==
=== Magoffin County ===
KY 404 begins at an intersection with KY 7 (Licking River Road) southeast of Arthurmabel, in the southeastern part of Magoffin County. It travels to the east-southeast, paralleling Howard Branch, and crosses over Bear Branch. It curves to the east-northeast and stops paralleling the branch when it ends. The highway curves to the northeast and enters Floyd County.

=== Floyd County ===
KY 404 winds its way to the east-southeast and crosses over Lick Fork. It begins paralleling the fork and enters David. There, it crosses over the fork again. It then curves to the east-northeast. It crosses over the fork again and curves to the east. It enters Goodloe, where it intersects the northern terminus of KY 850. Here, Lick Fork merges into the Left Fork Middle Creek, and KY 404 begins paralleling it. The highway intersects the northern terminus of KY 1210 (Caney Fork Road) and crosses over Buckeye Branch before it travels through Blue River. It crosses over Sam Hale and Blue River branches and then enters the far western part of Prestonsburg. There, it crosses over Middle Creek and meets its eastern terminus, an intersection with KY 114.

== Major intersections ==
County	Location	mi	km	Destinations	Notes
Magoffin		0.000	0.000	KY 7 (Licking River Road)	Western terminus
Floyd	Goodloe	5.811	9.352	KY 850 south	Northern terminus of KY 850
Floyd		6.857	11.035	KY 1210 south (Caney Fork Road)	Northern terminus of KY 1210
Floyd	Prestonsburg	10.848	17.458	KY 114	Eastern terminus
1.000 mi = 1.609 km; 1.000 km = 0.621 mi
