= Dawkins Line Rail Trail =

Rail trail in Kentucky, U.S.

- Location within Kentucky Location within the United States
- Location: Eastern Kentucky Coal Fields, Johnson County and Magoffin County, Kentucky USA
- Nearest city: Paintsville, Kentucky
- Coordinates: 37°44′12″N 82°54′00″W
- Established: June 15, 2013
- Governing body: Kentucky Department of Parks
- Length: 18 mi (29 km)
- Trailheads: Swamp Branch; Royalton
- Use: Cycling, Equestrian, and Hiking
- Difficulty: Easy
- Season: All
- Surface: Crushed stone
- Website: Official site

The Dawkins Line Rail Trail is an 18-mile (29.0 km) rail trail in Johnson and Magoffin Counties in Kentucky. The multi-use trail, suitable for biking, walking, and horseback riding, occupies an abandoned rail corridor that was constructed in the early 20th century for the Dawkins Lumber Company. It is the longest rail trail in Kentucky.

== History ==
The name of the trail was derived from the Dawkins Lumber Company, which incorporated the Big Sandy and Kentucky River Railroad (BS&K) to construct the railroad in 1912. This rail corridor was developed as means of transportation for company employees and for the extraction of timber from remote areas. After the stock market crash of 1929, the BS&K was dissolved and the Chesapeake and Ohio Railway (C&O) acquired the railroad's stock on September 22, 1930.

After the construction of a tunnel at Carver in 1949, the rail corridor was further expanded into Breathitt County.

The rail line right-of-way was owned by CSX in 2002 when it was purchased by the R.J. Corman Railroad Group. R.J. Corman decided to abandon the 36 mile rail line in November 2004. In 2006, the Kentucky General Assembly provided the initial funds necessary to convert the abandoned right-of-way into a rail trail. In 2011, the right-of-way was purchased from R.J. Corman and the project began to move forward. The Kentucky State Parks received a multi-county coal severance grant of $500,000 to help support the development of the trail. The Kentucky Transportation Cabinet provided the Department of Parks with $2 million in transportation program funding for the first phase, as well as approximately $285,000 in Transportation Enhancement funding for trailheads.

After the construction of Phase One of the rail trail was completed, the park opened to the public on June 15, 2013. When Phase Two of the project is constructed, the trail will extend to Evanston in Breathitt County. When completed, the Dawkins Line Rail Trail will be a total of 36-miles (57.9 km) long.

Future work (4th QTR 2014 or later) involves restoring abandoned railbed from Royalton southwest to near the tunnel at the Magoffin and Breathitt County line.

== See also ==
- List of rail trails
- Jenny Wiley State Resort Park
- Paintsville Lake State Park
- Pine Mountain State Scenic Trail
