= Kentucky Route 114 =

State highway in Kentucky, United States

Kentucky Route 114
- KY 114 highlighted in red

Route information
- Maintained by KYTC
- Length: 17.543 mi (28.233 km)

Major junctions
- West end: US 460 near Salyersville
- US 23 / US 460 in Prestonsburg
- North end: KY 1428 near Prestonsburg

Location
- Country: United States
- State: Kentucky
- Counties: Magoffin, Floyd

Highway system
- Kentucky State Highway System; Interstate; US; State; Parkways
← KY 113	→ KY 115

Kentucky Route 114 (KY 114) is a 17.543-mile-long (28.233 km) state highway in Kentucky. It runs from U.S. Route 460 (US 460) southeast of Salyersville to KY 1428 in Prestonsburg.

== 2020 ==
Plans were underway to extend the Mountain Parkway from Salyersville to Prestonsburg by 2020 using the KY 114 route. This might have resulted in the end of KY 114.

== Major intersections ==
County	Location	mi	km	Destinations	Notes
Magoffin		0.000	0.000	US 460 (Rockhouse Road)	Western terminus
Magoffin		2.758	4.439	KY 1888 west (Burning Fork Road)	Eastern terminus of KY 1888
Floyd		5.306	8.539	KY 1427 east (Abbott Creek Road)	Western terminus of KY 1427
Floyd	Prestonsburg	14.593	23.485	KY 404 west	Eastern terminus of KY 404
Floyd		15.503	24.950	KY 2555 north (Old State Highway 114)	Southern terminus of KY 2555
Floyd		15.773	25.384	KY 122 east (Spurlock Creek)	Western terminus of KY 122
Floyd	Prestonsburg	16.399	26.392	US 23 / US 460 – Paintsville, Pikeville	Access to/from KY 114 via interchange
Floyd	Prestonsburg	17.108	27.533	KY 2555 south (Main Street)	Northern terminus of KY 2555
Floyd	Prestonsburg	17.543	28.233	KY 1428 (North Lake Drive)	Eastern terminus
1.000 mi = 1.609 km; 1.000 km = 0.621 mi
