= Salyersville National Bank =

- Salyersville Bank
- U.S. National Register of Historic Places
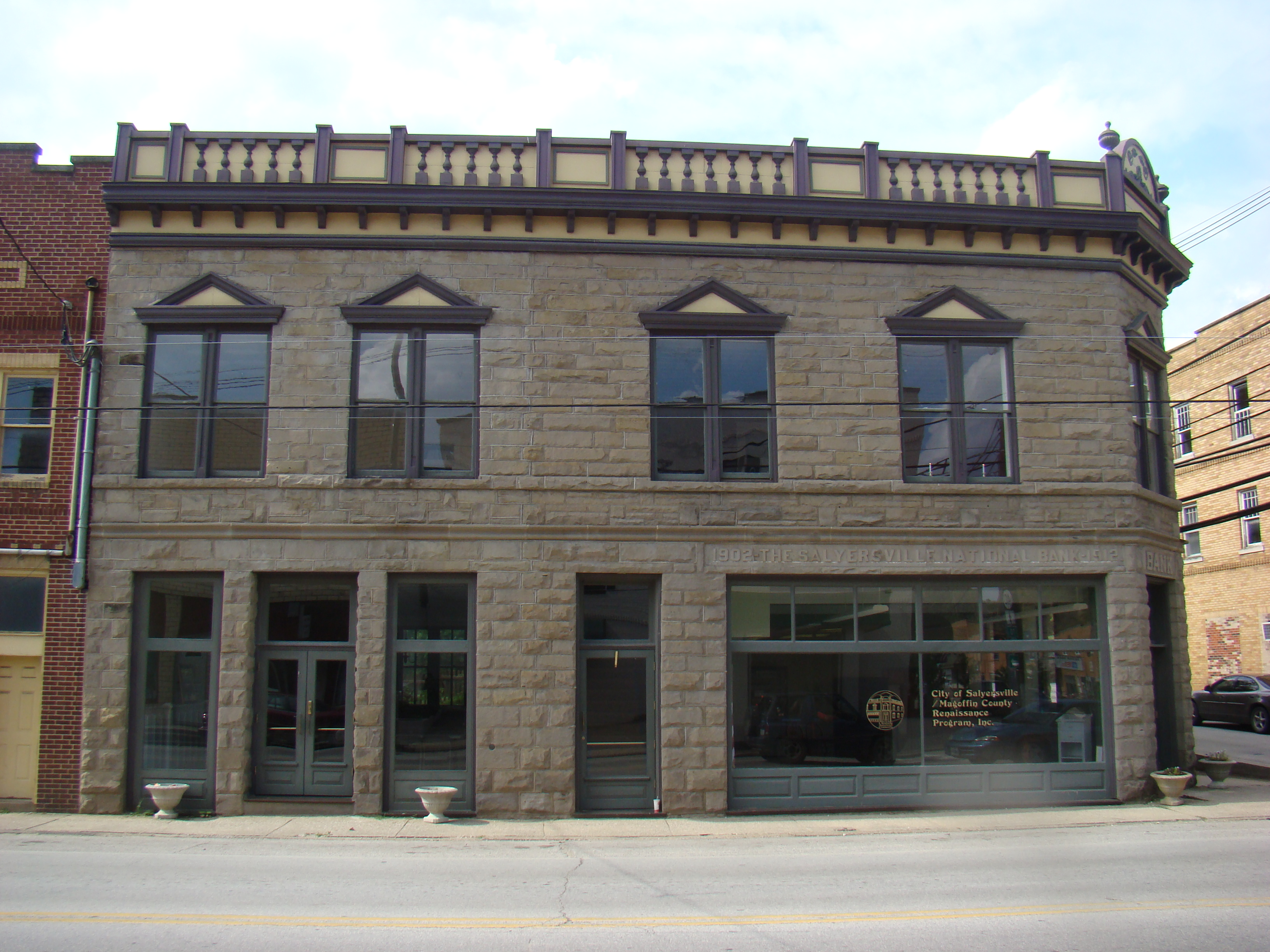
- Front of the bank

- Location within Kentucky Location within the United States
- Location: Salyersville, Kentucky
- Coordinates: 37°45′10″N 83°4′9″W
- Built: 1912
- Architectural style: Beaux Arts
- NRHP reference No.: 97001340
- Added to NRHP: November 7, 1997

Salyersville National Bank is a small community bank in Magoffin County, Kentucky. The bank originally operated out of offices located at the junction of Maple and North Church streets in Salyersville. Still in existence, this building is used by Salyersville Renaissance, a Main Street Program.

== History ==
The Salyersville National bank was chartered a national bank in 1902 by George Carpenter.

Salyersville Bank building was added to the National Register of Historic Places on November 7, 1997.
