= WRLV-FM =

- Salyersville, Kentucky; United States
- Frequency: 106.5 MHz
- Branding: Pure Country 106.5

Programming
- Format: Country
- Affiliations: Westwood One

Ownership
- Owner: Morgan County Industries, Inc.

History
- First air date: August 25, 1989

Technical information
- Licensing authority: FCC
- Facility ID: 37255
- Class: A
- ERP: 5,900 watts
- HAAT: 101 meters
- Transmitter coordinates: 37°45′27.00″N 83°3′50.00″W

Links
- Public license information: Public file; LMS

WRLV-FM (106.5 FM) is a radio station broadcasting a country music format. Established in 1989, the station is licensed to serve Salyersville, Kentucky, United States. The station is owned by Morgan County Industries, Inc.
