= Falcon, Kentucky =

Unincorporated community in Kentucky, United States

- Unincorporated community
- Nickname: Stringtown
- Location within Kentucky Location within the United States
- Coordinates: 37°47′23″N 83°0′7″W
- Country: United States
- State: Kentucky
- County: Magoffin

Government
  - Mayor: Bill Montgomery
- Elevation: 974 ft (297 m)
- Time zone: UTC-5 (Eastern (EST))
  - Summer (DST): UTC-4 (EDT)
- ZIP codes: 41426
- Area code: 606
- GNIS feature ID: 507973

Falcon is an unincorporated community in Magoffin County, Kentucky, United States. It lies along Route 40 northeast of the city of Salyersville, the county seat of Magoffin County. Its elevation is 974 feet (297 m). It has a post office with the ZIP code 41426.
