= Harper, Kentucky =

Unincorporated community in Kentucky, United States

Coordinates: 37°48′07″N 83°11′46″W

Harper is an unincorporated community in Magoffin County, Kentucky. A post office was established on March 7, 1915, and named after its first postmaster, Nannie Harper Arnett.
