= Cisco, Kentucky =

Unincorporated community in Kentucky, United States

- Unincorporated community
- Location within Kentucky Location within the United States
- Coordinates: 37°51′9″N 83°8′7″W
- Country: United States
- State: Kentucky
- County: Magoffin
- Elevation: 837 ft (255 m)
- Time zone: UTC-5 (Eastern (EST))
  - Summer (DST): UTC-4 (EDT)
- ZIP codes: 41410
- GNIS feature ID: 507703

Cisco is an unincorporated community within Magoffin County, Kentucky, United States.

The town was established in 1902 and is said to have been named for the first postmaster Hatler Cisco.
