= Gypsy, Kentucky =

Unincorporated community in Kentucky, United States

- Unincorporated community
- Location within Kentucky Location within the United States
- Coordinates: 37°39′45″N 82°57′50″W
- Country: United States
- State: Kentucky
- County: Magoffin
- Elevation: 974 ft (297 m)
- Time zone: UTC-5 (Eastern (EST))
  - Summer (DST): UTC-4 (EDT)
- ZIP codes: 41438
- GNIS feature ID: 508152

Gypsy is an unincorporated community within Magoffin County, Kentucky, United States.

== History ==
Gypsy was named for a daughter of the local schoolteacher who had successfully led the effort to get the community a post office in 1883. The post office there remained in operation from 1883 until it was discontinued in 1994.
