= Bethanna, Kentucky =

Unincorporated community in Kentucky, United States

- Unincorporated community
- Location within Kentucky Location within the United States
- Coordinates: 37°46′31″N 83°11′1″W
- Country: United States
- State: Kentucky
- County: Magoffin
- Elevation: 866 ft (264 m)
- Time zone: UTC-5 (Eastern (EST))
  - Summer (DST): UTC-4 (EDT)
- ZIP codes: 41401
- GNIS feature ID: 507498

Bethanna is an unincorporated community within Magoffin County, Kentucky, United States.
