= Magoffin County High School =

Location
- 1100 East Mountain Parkway; Salyersville, Kentucky 41465; United States
- Coordinates: 37°44′15″N 83°4′29″W

Information
- School type: Public
- Principal: Brian Conley
- Teaching staff: 40.00 (FTE)
- Grades: 9-12
- Enrollment: 586 (2023–2024)
- Student to teacher ratio: 14.65
- Campus type: Rural
- Colors: Maroon, White, Black
- Slogan: "We Are Magoffin"
- Mascot: Hornets
- Newspaper: The Buzz
- Yearbook: The Sting
- Website: Magoffin County High School

Magoffin County High School (MCHS) is a public secondary-level education high school located in Salyersville, Magoffin County, Kentucky and is part of the Magoffin County Public School District. MCHS is the only high school located within Magoffin County.

== History ==
Tragedy struck the Magoffin County High School building at Hornet Drive on March 2, 2012, when an EF3 tornado caused extensive damage to the primary building, along with multiple other buildings in the area. Two years passed until $40 Million in funding was raised to build a new complex for Magoffin County High School adjacent to the Mountain Parkway and US 460.

In August 2016 the new buildings were open to all students. This included a new Gymnasium, a new Football Field, a new Running Track, all new classrooms and cafeterias.

Starting in 2004, Magoffin County High School teamed up with local cable provider "Howard Cable" to create the "Magoffin County Schools Television" channel (MCS-TV). The channel's programming includes school athletics games, club-created programs, field trip memorial videos and other original programming focused on the county's public schools.

== Career and technical development ==
In addition to the primary Magoffin County High School building, the public school system offers the Magoffin County Career & Technical Center (MCCTC). The career development programs offered by MCCTC include Electricity, Carpentry, Welding, Computing and Horticulture.

== Clubs ==
Magoffin County High School offers many clubs to its students. These include Academic Team, Beta Club, Champions Against Drugs, Students Against Drunk Drivers, Christian Youth Club, Drama Club, Key Club, MCHS Band, MCHS Cheerleaders, MCHS Dance Team, MCHS Yearbook.

== Sports ==
Magoffin County High School offers many extra-curricular sports activities. These include boys' baseball, boys' and girls' basketball, cheerleading, boys' and girls' cross country, dance team, American football, girls' fast pitch softball, golf, boys' and girls' tennis, boys' and girls' track & field and girls' volleyball.

In 2006, Head Coach Steve Miller and his Magoffin County Lady Hornets basketball team won the 15th Regional Basketball Championship.

In 2024, the boys' basketball team became 15th Regional Champions and advanced to the Sweet 16 for the first time in the school's history.

The boys' and girls' track and field teams have produced numerous individual regional championships with respectful placings in state competitions. The Magoffin County High School Dance Team has won many regional and state championships.
