= Mashfork, Kentucky =

Unincorporated community in Kentucky, United States

- Unincorporated community
- Location within Kentucky Location within the United States
- Coordinates: 37°45′41″N 83°00′20″W
- Country: United States
- State: Kentucky
- County: Magoffin

Government
- Elevation: 915 ft (279 m)
- Time zone: UTC-5 (Eastern (EST))
  - Summer (DST): UTC-4 (EDT)
- ZIP codes: 41465
- GNIS feature ID: 508553

Mashfork is an unincorporated community within Magoffin County, Kentucky, United States.
