= Wonnie, Kentucky =

Unincorporated community in Kentucky, United States

- Unincorporated community
- Location within Kentucky Location within the United States
- Coordinates: 37°48′33″N 83°9′15″W
- Country: United States
- State: Kentucky
- County: Magoffin
- Elevation: 814 ft (248 m)
- Time zone: UTC-5 (Eastern (EST))
  - Summer (DST): UTC-4 (EDT)
- ZIP codes: 41475
- GNIS feature ID: 509400

Wonnie is an unincorporated community in Magoffin County, Kentucky, United States. It lies along U.S. Route 460 and Kentucky Route 1081 northwest of the city of Salyersville, the county seat of Magoffin County. Its elevation is 814 feet (248 m).
