= Ever, Kentucky =

Unincorporated community in Kentucky, United States

- Unincorporated community
- Location within Kentucky Location within the United States
- Coordinates: 37°50′55″N 83°3′7″W
- Country: United States
- State: Kentucky
- County: Magoffin
- Elevation: 1,027 ft (313 m)
- Time zone: UTC-5 (Eastern (EST))
  - Summer (DST): UTC-4 (EDT)
- ZIP codes: 41424
- GNIS feature ID: 507961

Ever is an unincorporated community within Magoffin County, Kentucky, United States.
