= Fritz, Kentucky =

Unincorporated community in Kentucky, United States

- Unincorporated community
- Location within Kentucky Location within the United States
- Coordinates: 37°42′5″N 83°9′6″W
- Country: United States
- State: Kentucky
- County: Magoffin
- Elevation: 879 ft (268 m)
- Time zone: UTC-5 (Eastern (EST))
  - Summer (DST): UTC-4 (EDT)
- ZIP codes: 41431
- GNIS feature ID: 508042

Fritz is an unincorporated community within Magoffin County, Kentucky, United States.

A post office first opened in the community in 1912 and has been known historically as Jondun and Nola. The name was changed to Fritz in 1916 in honor of Fritz Arnett, a resident who had filed the first application for the post office.
