= Gapville, Kentucky =

Unincorporated community in Kentucky, United States

- Unincorporated community
- Location within Kentucky Location within the United States
- Coordinates: 37°37′48″N 82°57′33″W
- Country: United States
- State: Kentucky
- County: Magoffin
- Elevation: 948 ft (289 m)
- Time zone: UTC-5 (Eastern (EST))
  - Summer (DST): UTC-4 (EDT)
- ZIP codes: 41433
- GNIS feature ID: 508065

Gapville is an unincorporated community within Magoffin County, Kentucky, United States.

A post office was established in the community in 1888. Gapville was named for a local mountain pass important to early travel through the area.
