= 2008 Kentucky Democratic presidential primary =

- May 20, 2008

60 Democratic National Convention delegates (51 pledged, 9 unpledged) The number of pledged delegates received

Candidate	Hillary Clinton	Barack Obama
Home state	New York	Illinois
Delegate count	37	14
Popular vote	459,511	209,954
Percentage	65.48%	29.92%
- Primary results by county Clinton: 50–60% 60–70% 70–80% 80–90% 90–100% Obama: 50–60%

The 2008 Kentucky Democratic presidential primary took place May 20, 2008, and had 51 delegates at stake. The winner in each of Kentucky's six congressional districts was awarded all of that district's delegates, totaling 34. Another 17 delegates were awarded to the statewide winner, Hillary Clinton. The 51 delegates represented Kentucky at the Democratic National Convention in Denver, Colorado. Nine other unpledged delegates, known as superdelegates, also attended the convention and cast their votes as well.

Kentucky had a closed primary, meaning it was open only to registered Democrats. Those wishing to participate in the primary had to register as Democrats 28 days prior to the primary.

There were 3,545 precincts in 120 counties with 1,629,845 Democratic registered voters, and the turnout was 43.0% of the registered voters.

== Polls ==
According to a poll from Rasmussen Reports taken before the primary, Hillary Clinton led Barack Obama 56-31 percent in Kentucky with 13 percent undecided.

As of April 30, two superdelegates had pledged support for Obama while three had endorsed Clinton.

== Results ==
Primary Date: May 20, 2008

National Pledged Delegates Determined: 51

Kentucky Democratic Presidential Primary Results – 2008
Party	Candidate	Votes	Percentage	Delegates
Democratic	Hillary Clinton	459,511	65.48%	37
Democratic	Barack Obama	209,954	29.92%	14
Democratic	Uncommitted	18,091	2.58%	0
Democratic	John Edwards	14,212	2.03%	0
Totals		701,768	100.00%	51
Voter turnout		43.00%		—

== Analysis ==
Hillary Clinton won a decisive two-to-one victory in Kentucky, a state located in the Appalachian region which had many of the demographics in her favor. According to exit polls, 89 percent of voters in the Kentucky Democratic Primary were white and they opted for Clinton by a margin of 72–23 compared to the 9 percent of African American voters who backed Obama by a margin of 90–7. Clinton won all age groups, all socioeconomic/income classes and educational attainment ladders of voters. Registered Democrats, who comprised 84 percent of the turnout, backed Clinton by a margin of 68–30. She also won all ideological groups. Regarding religion, Clinton dominated all major denominations by two-to-one margins, including Protestants which backed her 66–28, Roman Catholics supported her 66–31, and other Christians favored Clinton by a margin of 66–30. It was a conclusive landslide victory for Clinton.

Clinton carried all but two counties: Jefferson County, which contains Louisville, and Fayette County, which contains Lexington. Her best performance was in Southeast Kentucky, located in the heart of Appalachia, an area made up of less educated, lower-income, working-class whites. In fact, it was here where Clinton received her largest margin of victory in a county nationwide: Magoffin County gave Clinton 92.98 percent of the vote while Obama only received a meager 5.00 percent.

Kentucky was another state that highlighted Barack Obama's growing problem among working-class whites, a swing voting bloc also referred to as Reagan Democrats who Clinton claimed were crucial to Democrats winning back the White House. Exit polls in Kentucky supported Clinton's claim – of Kentucky voters who voted for Clinton, only one-third of voters said they would vote for Obama should he become the nominee while another one-third said they would vote for presumptive Republican presidential nominee John McCain and another one-third said they would not vote at all.

== See also ==
- Democratic Party (United States) presidential primaries, 2008
- Kentucky Republican primary, 2008
