= Gardner Farmstead =

- U.S. National Register of Historic Places
- Location within Kentucky Location within the United States
- Location: Licking Station Rd., Salyersville, Kentucky
- Coordinates: 37°44′42″N 83°04′50″W
- NRHP reference No.: 15000653
- Added to NRHP: September 29, 2015

Gardner Farmstead, on Licking Station Rd. near Salyersville, Kentucky was listed on the National Register of Historic Places in 2015.

The main house was built c.1830 as a two-story dog-trot log house built of half-dovetail notched logs, and evolved to be a five-bay I-house with a rear ell.
