= Ulvah, Kentucky =

Unincorporated community in Kentucky, United States

- Unincorporated community
- Location in Kentucky Location in the United States
- Coordinates: 37°7′40″N 83°3′8″W
- Country: United States
- State: Kentucky
- County: Letcher
- Elevation: 971 ft (296 m)
- Time zone: UTC-5 (Eastern (EST))
  - Summer (DST): UTC-4 (EDT)
- GNIS feature ID: 509257

Ulvah is an unincorporated community in Letcher County, Kentucky, United States. Its post office has ceased to exist.

Located on the North Fork of the Kentucky River, William T. Haney founded the community in 1897 as "Gourd". The Louisville and Nashville Railroad came through in 1912, and is said to have named a station after a line in the poem Lord Ullin's Daughter by Thomas Campbell, which the community adopted as its name.
