= Sunshine, Greenup County, Kentucky =

Unincorporated community in Kentucky, United States

- Unincorporated community
- Location within Kentucky Location within the United States
- Coordinates: 38°42′27″N 82°56′55″W
- Country: United States
- State: Kentucky
- County: Greenup
- Elevation: 541 ft (165 m)
- Time zone: UTC-5 (Eastern (EST))
  - Summer (DST): UTC-4 (EDT)
- GNIS feature ID: 504810

Sunshine is an unincorporated community located in Greenup County, Kentucky, United States.
