= 2008 Kentucky Republican presidential primary =

- May 20, 2008
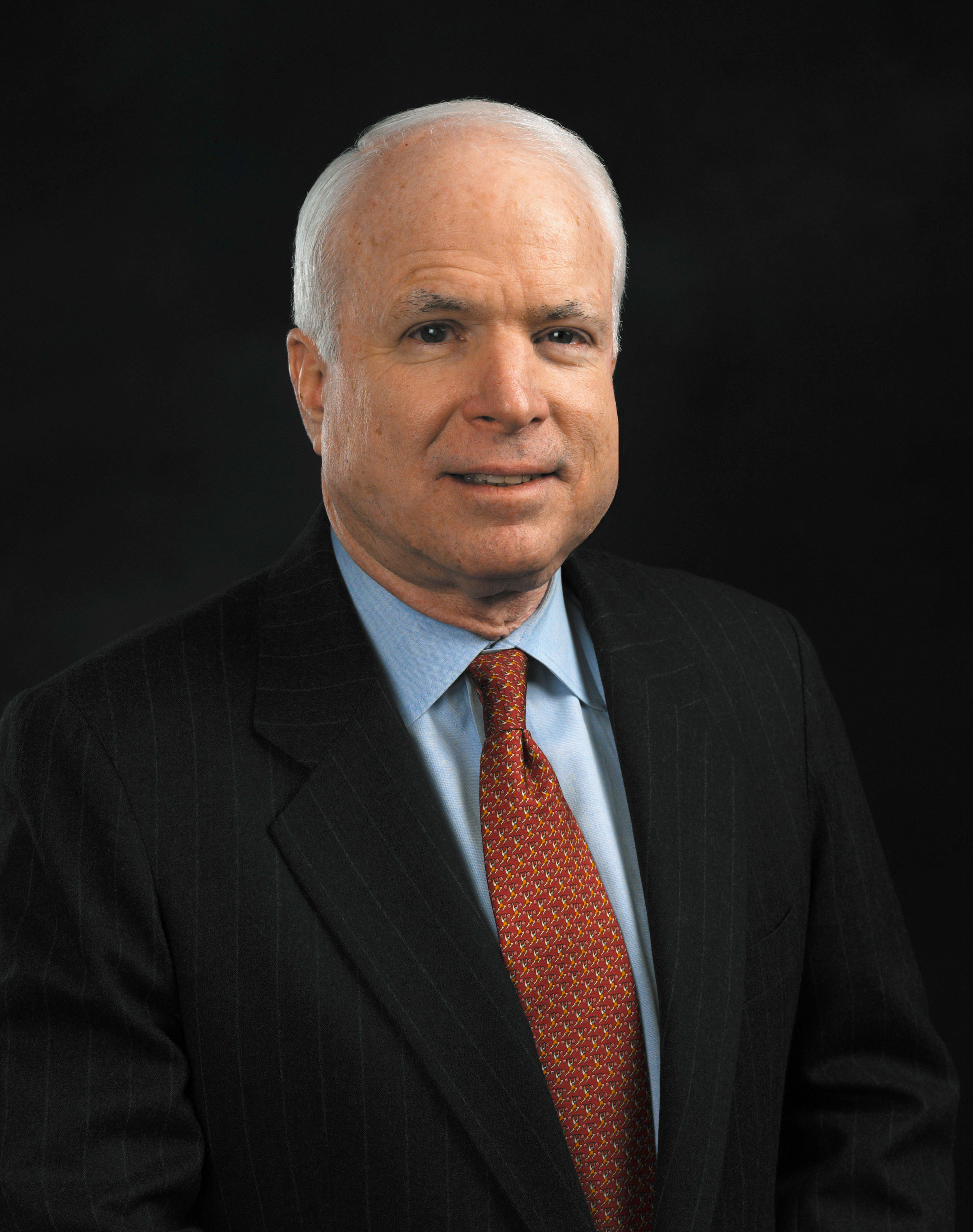

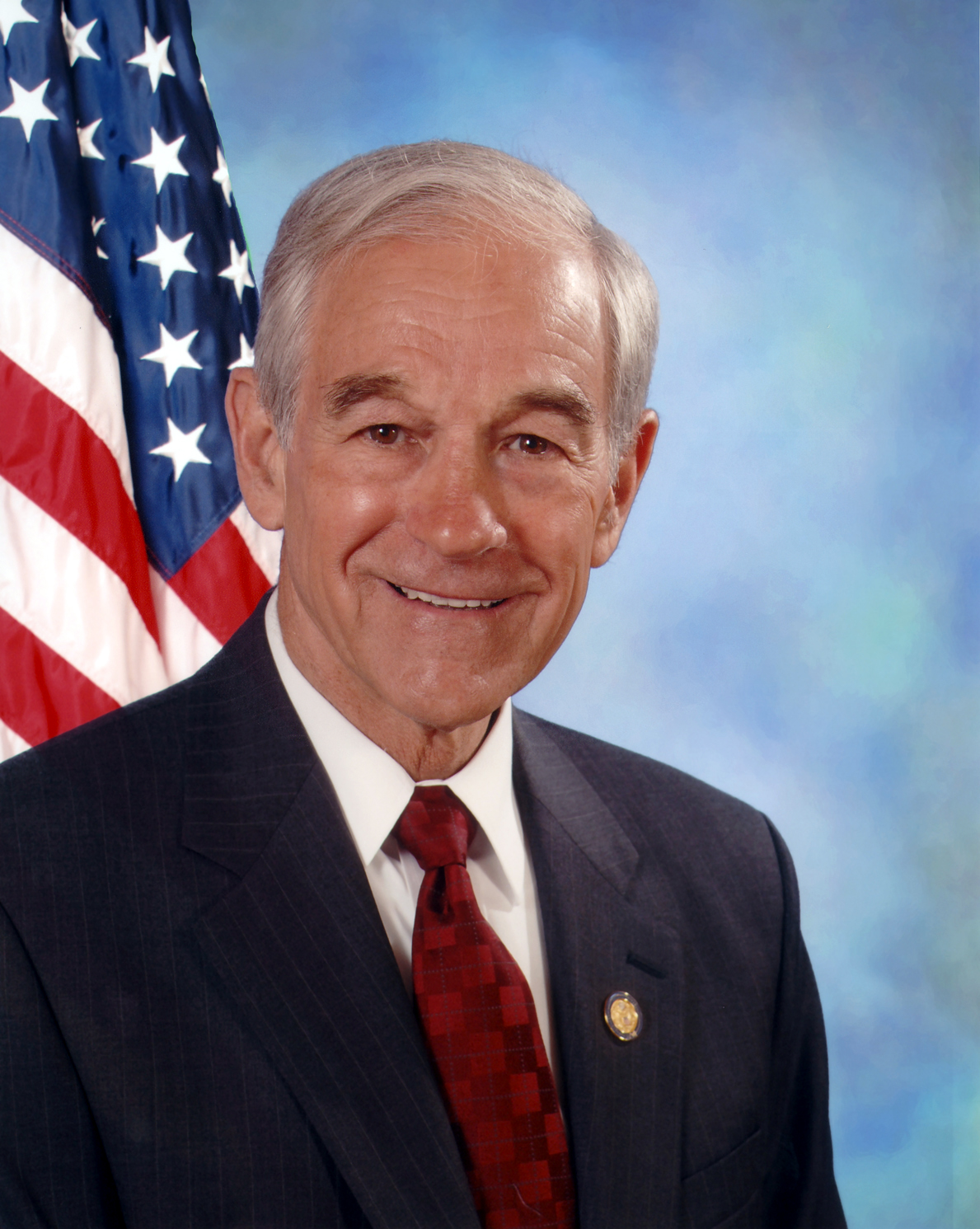

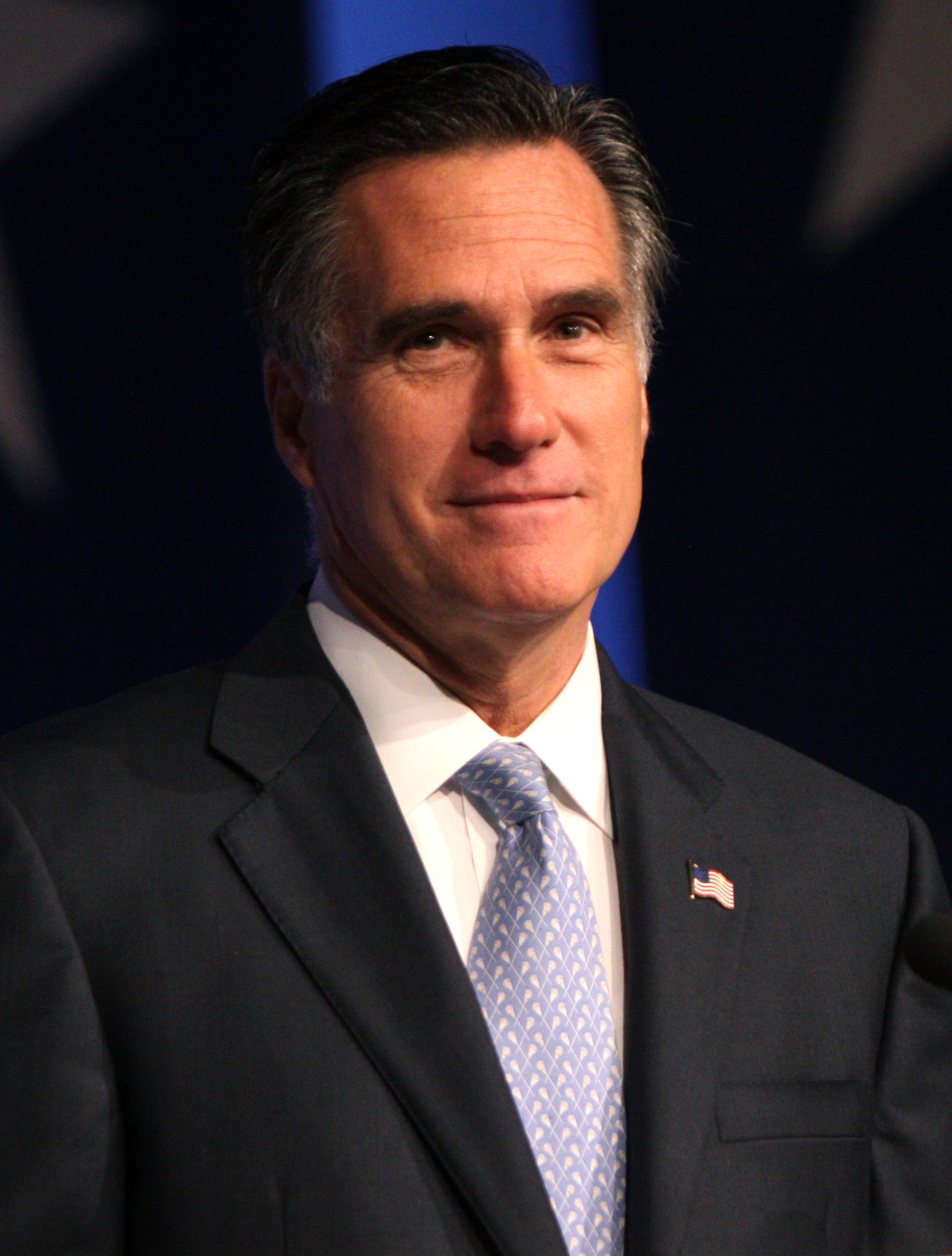
Candidate	John McCain	Mike Huckabee
Party	Republican	Republican
Home state	Arizona	Arkansas
Delegate count	42	0
Popular vote	142,918	16,388
Percentage	72.26%	8.29%
Candidate	Ron Paul	Mitt Romney
Party	Republican	Republican
Home state	Texas	Massachusetts
Delegate count	0	0
Popular vote	13,427	9,206
Percentage	6.79%	4.65%
- County results John McCain

The 2008 Kentucky Republican presidential primary took place on May 20, 2008. The only Republican candidates that were still in the race were Senator John McCain and Congressman Ron Paul. McCain was the presumptive Republican nominee, having already won enough delegates to secure his eventual nomination. McCain won the primary.

== Results ==
100% of precincts reporting
Candidate	Votes	Percentage	Delegates
John McCain	142,918	72.26%	42
Mike Huckabee*	16,388	8.29%	0
Ron Paul	13,427	6.79%	0
Mitt Romney*	9,206	4.65%	0
Rudy Giuliani*	3,055	1.54%	0
Alan Keyes*	2,044	1.03%	0
Uncommitted	10,755	5.44%	0
Total	197,793	100%	42

* Candidate dropped out of the race before the primary

== See also ==
- Kentucky Democratic primary, 2008
- Republican Party (United States) presidential primaries, 2008
