= Marshallville, Kentucky =

Unincorporated community in Kentucky, United States

- Unincorporated community
- Location within Kentucky Location within the United States
- Coordinates: 37°40′41″N 82°59′22″W
- Country: United States
- State: Kentucky
- County: Magoffin
- Elevation: 951 ft (290 m)
- Time zone: UTC-5 (Eastern (EST))
  - Summer (DST): UTC-4 (EDT)
- ZIP codes: 41452
- GNIS feature ID: 508545

Marshallville is an unincorporated community within Magoffin County, Kentucky, United States.
