= Flatfork, West Virginia =

Unincorporated community in West Virginia, United States

Flatfork
- Unincorporated community
- Location within the state of West Virginia
- Coordinates: 38°42′27″N 81°29′47″W
- Country: United States
- State: West Virginia
- County: Roane
- Elevation: 778 ft (237 m)
- Time zone: UTC-5 (Eastern (EST))
  - Summer (DST): UTC-4 (EDT)
- GNIS feature ID: 1740882

Flatfork is an unincorporated community in Roane County, in the U.S. state of West Virginia.

== History ==
A post office called Flat Fork was established in 1857, the name was changed to Flatfork in 1895, and the post office closed in 1935. The community takes its name from nearby Flat Fork creek.
