= Flat Fork, Kentucky =

Unincorporated community in Kentucky, United States

- Unincorporated community
- Location within Kentucky Location within the United States
- Coordinates: 37°50′16″N 83°1′43″W
- Country: United States
- State: Kentucky
- County: Magoffin
- Elevation: 919 ft (280 m)
- Time zone: UTC-5 (Eastern (EST))
  - Summer (DST): UTC-4 (EDT)
- ZIP codes: 41427
- GNIS feature ID: 508006

Flat Fork is an unincorporated community within Magoffin County, Kentucky, United States.

A post office was established in the community in 1934 and named for a fork in the nearby Little Paint Creek.
