= Edna, Kentucky =

Unincorporated community in Kentucky, United States

- Unincorporated community
- Location within Kentucky Location within the United States
- Coordinates: 37°47′36″N 83°9′2″W
- Country: United States
- State: Kentucky
- County: Magoffin
- Elevation: 827 ft (252 m)
- Time zone: UTC-5 (Eastern (EST))
  - Summer (DST): UTC-4 (EDT)
- ZIP codes: 41419
- GNIS feature ID: 507913

Edna is an unincorporated community within Magoffin County, Kentucky, United States.

A post office was established at Edna in 1900 and named for the local Edna Patton Amyx.
