= Burning Fork, Kentucky =

Unincorporated community in Kentucky, United States

- Unincorporated community
- Location within Kentucky Location within the United States
- Coordinates: 37°44′0″N 83°1′24″W
- Country: United States
- State: Kentucky
- County: Magoffin
- Elevation: 899 ft (274 m)
- Time zone: UTC-5 (Eastern (EST))
  - Summer (DST): UTC-4 (EDT)
- ZIP codes: 41405
- GNIS feature ID: 507625

Burning Fork is an unincorporated community located in Magoffin County, Kentucky, United States. The etymology of Burning Fork refers to a natural gas vein that was ignited and eventually extinguished by 1865.
