= Magoffin County, Kentucky =

County in the United States

- County
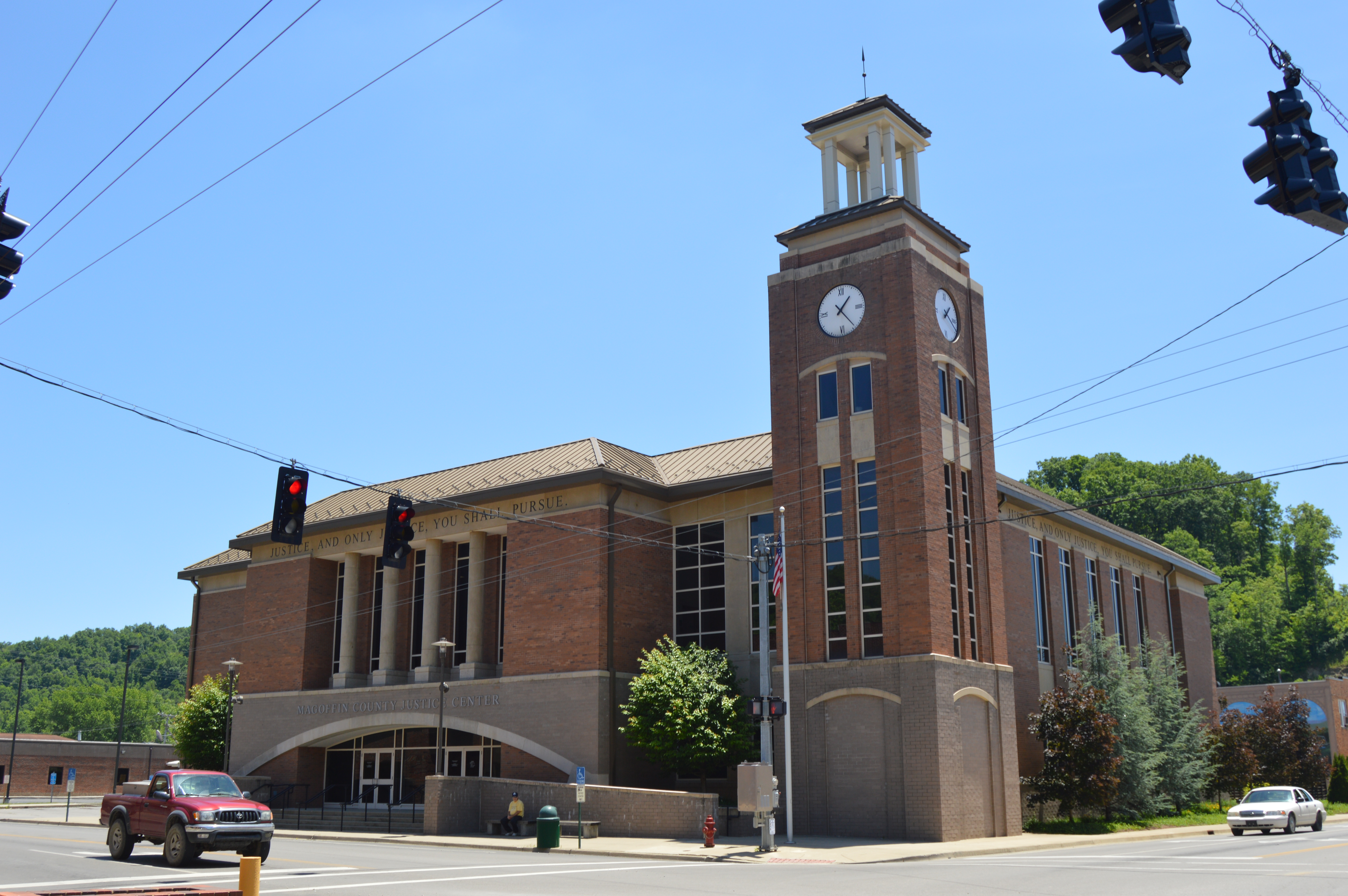
- Magoffin County justice center in Salyersville

- Location within the U.S. state of Kentucky
- Coordinates: 37°42′N 83°04′W
- Country: United States
- State: Kentucky
- Founded: 1860
- Named for: Beriah Magoffin
- Seat: Salyersville
- Largest city: Salyersville

Government
  - Judge/Executive: Don McFarland (D)

Area
  - Total: 309 sq mi (800 km^{2})
  - Land: 308 sq mi (800 km^{2})
  - Water: 0.7 sq mi (1.8 km^{2}) 0.2%

Population (2020)
  - Total: 11,637
  - Estimate (2025): 11,110 ▼
  - Density: 37.8/sq mi (14.6/km^{2})
- Time zone: UTC−5 (Eastern)
  - Summer (DST): UTC−4 (EDT)
- Congressional district: 5th
- Website: magoffincounty.ky.gov

Magoffin County is a county located in the U.S. state of Kentucky. As of the 2020 census, its population was 11,637. Its county seat is Salyersville. The county was formed in 1860 from adjacent portions of Floyd, Johnson, and Morgan Counties. It was named for Beriah Magoffin, who was governor of Kentucky (1859–62).

== History ==
The area now encompassed by Kentucky's Magoffin County was first bounded in 1772, when all of what is now the state of Kentucky was in the frontier county of Fincastle County, Virginia. Fincastle was divided in 1776, with the western portion named Kentucky County, Virginia. In 1780, the Virginia legislature set aside all land in Kentucky County for soldiers who had served in the Revolutionary War. In 1780, Kentucky County was divided into three counties: Jefferson, Fayette, and Lincoln. Fayette County was divided in 1785, with part becoming Bourbon County. In 1792, the southern part of Bourbon County was partitioned off to form Clark County The area was further divided in 1796 to form Montgomery County, with Fleming County being partitioned from the area in 1798. In 1800, Floyd County was created from portions of Fleming, Mason, and Montgomery Counties. In 1843, Johnson County was carved out of the previous Bath County area, which was created in 1811 from Montgomery County, and which lost a portion of its territory in 1843 for the creation of Johnson County.

In 1860, the Kentucky Legislature partitioned parts of Johnson, Floyd, and Morgan Counties, to create Magoffin County. Its boundaries have remained unchanged since that time.

During the Civil War, Magoffin County had a unionist majority existing in the area, albeit with highly divided sentiment. While about 123 men enlisted in the Confederate Army, roughly 308 men served in the Union Army.

According to sworn testimony accepted by the U.S. House of Representatives, more than 100 former Confederate soldiers voted in Magoffin County in the 1867 election for John D. Young over Samuel McKee.

As the late 19th century progressed, Magoffin County became a leading supplier in oil and gas production in the area, with some of the first oil wells in Eastern Kentucky being built in the county.

== Geography ==
According to the U.S. Census Bureau, the county has a total area of 309 square miles (800 km^{2}), of which 0.7 sq mi (1.8 km^{2}) (0.2% or about 450 ac) is covered by water. It is watered by Licking River.

=== Adjacent counties ===
- Morgan County (northwest)
- Johnson County (northeast)
- Floyd County (southeast)
- Knott County (south)
- Breathitt County (southwest)
- Wolfe County (west)

== Demographics ==
Historical population
Census	Pop.	Note	%±
1870	4,684		—
1880	6,944		48.2%
1890	9,196		32.4%
1900	12,006		30.6%
1910	13,654		13.7%
1920	13,859		1.5%
1930	15,719		13.4%
1940	17,490		11.3%
1950	13,839		−20.9%
1960	11,156		−19.4%
1970	10,443		−6.4%
1980	13,515		29.4%
1990	13,077		−3.2%
2000	13,332		1.9%
2010	13,333		0.0%
2020	11,637		−12.7%
2025 (est.)	11,110	▼	−4.5%
U.S. Decennial Census; 1790-1960 1900-1990; 1990-2000 2010-2021

=== 2020 census ===
As of the 2020 census, the county had a population of 11,637. The median age was 43.7 years. 21.3% of residents were under the age of 18 and 18.9% of residents were 65 years of age or older. For every 100 females there were 96.7 males, and for every 100 females age 18 and over there were 93.6 males age 18 and over.

The racial makeup of the county was 97.6% White, 0.1% Black or African American, 0.1% American Indian and Alaska Native, 0.0% Asian, 0.1% Native Hawaiian and Pacific Islander, 0.3% from some other race, and 1.8% from two or more races. Hispanic or Latino residents of any race comprised 0.6% of the population.

0.0% of residents lived in urban areas, while 100.0% lived in rural areas.

There were 4,802 households in the county, of which 29.9% had children under the age of 18 living with them and 27.3% had a female householder with no spouse or partner present. About 29.2% of all households were made up of individuals and 12.9% had someone living alone who was 65 years of age or older.

There were 5,402 housing units, of which 11.1% were vacant. Among occupied housing units, 77.7% were owner-occupied and 22.3% were renter-occupied. The homeowner vacancy rate was 0.6% and the rental vacancy rate was 7.6%.

=== 2010 census ===
As of the 2010 United States census, 13,333 people were living in the county. The racial makeup was 98.6% White, 0.3% Native American, 0.1% Black or African American, 0.1% Asian, 0.2% of some other race and 0.7% of two or more races. 0.7% were Hispanic or Latino people (of any race).

=== 2000 census ===
As of the 2000 census, 13,332 people, 5,024 households, and 3,858 families resided in the county. The population density was 43 per square mile (17/km^{2}). The 5,447 housing units had an average density of 18 per square mile (6.9/km^{2}). The racial makeup of the county was 99.29% White, 0.15% African American, 0.20% Native American, 0.08% Asian, 0.02% from other races, and 0.27% from two or more races. About 0.42% of the population were Hispanics or Latinos of any race. A significant Melungeon or mixed-race group of Carmel Melungeons live in Magoffin County. In a 2007 study by the U.S. Census Bureau, Magoffin County, along with Mitchell County in Iowa, was cited as the U.S. county having the largest percentage of individuals in the demographic category of "non-Hispanic White alone."

Of the 5,024 households, 37.5% had children under 18 living with them, 61.9% were married couples living together, 11.2% had a female householder with no husband present, and 23.2% were not families. About 21.4% of all households were made up of individuals, and 8.2% had someone living alone who was 65 or older. The average household size was 2.62 and the average family size was 3.04.

In the county, the age distribution was 26.8% under 18, 10.1% from 18 to 24, 30.2% from 25 to 44, 22.4% from 45 to 64, and 10.6% who were 65 or older. The median age was 34 years. For every 100 females, there were 97.2 males. For every 100 females 18 and over, there were 94.4 males.

The median income for a household in the county was $19,421, and for a family was $24,031. Males had a median income of $27,745 versus $18,354 for females. The per capita income for the county was $10,685. About 31.2% of families and 36.6% of the population were below the poverty line, including 45.9% of those under 18 and 29.1% of those 65 or over.

== Politics ==
United States presidential election results for Magoffin County, Kentucky
Year	Republican		Democratic		Third party(ies)	
Year	No.	%	No.	%	No.	%
1912	1,004	43.50%	891	38.60%	413	17.89%
1916	1,535	51.23%	1,433	47.83%	28	0.93%
1920	2,347	63.18%	1,352	36.39%	16	0.43%
1924	2,196	55.25%	1,757	44.20%	22	0.55%
1928	2,816	60.93%	1,806	39.07%	0	0.00%
1932	2,661	49.32%	2,721	50.44%	13	0.24%
1936	2,577	50.17%	2,554	49.72%	6	0.12%
1940	2,668	48.68%	2,812	51.30%	1	0.02%
1944	2,135	51.25%	2,031	48.75%	0	0.00%
1948	1,882	45.51%	2,253	54.49%	0	0.00%
1952	2,093	48.20%	2,243	51.66%	6	0.14%
1956	2,343	51.96%	2,162	47.95%	4	0.09%
1960	2,736	52.54%	2,471	47.46%	0	0.00%
1964	1,327	34.44%	2,498	64.83%	28	0.73%
1968	1,927	46.74%	1,967	47.71%	229	5.55%
1972	2,243	52.39%	2,024	47.28%	14	0.33%
1976	1,793	42.06%	2,451	57.49%	19	0.45%
1980	2,265	42.76%	2,986	56.37%	46	0.87%
1984	2,343	44.22%	2,942	55.53%	13	0.25%
1988	2,158	42.48%	2,895	56.99%	27	0.53%
1992	1,992	34.88%	3,261	57.10%	458	8.02%
1996	1,434	35.45%	2,249	55.60%	362	8.95%
2000	2,785	51.07%	2,603	47.74%	65	1.19%
2004	2,836	49.60%	2,843	49.72%	39	0.68%
2008	2,434	52.33%	2,105	45.26%	112	2.41%
2012	3,391	69.12%	1,433	29.21%	82	1.67%
2016	3,824	74.75%	1,172	22.91%	120	2.35%
2020	4,174	76.63%	1,214	22.29%	59	1.08%
2024	4,288	81.18%	909	17.21%	85	1.61%

Magoffin County prior to the 1930s was a strongly Republican County at the national level, voting for the Republican Party in an unbroken streak under the Fourth Party System from 1880 to 1932. At the state and local level, though, it remained Democratic, voting for James B. McCreary in 1875, and Preston Leslie in 1879 for governor – both former Confederates.

Between 1932 and 2004, Magoffin County generally began to vote Democratic in presidential elections; since the 2000s, it has voted Republican. In 2024, Republican Donald Trump received 81% of the vote in the county, the highest vote share in its history.

It voted for Democrat Andy Beshear for governor in both the 2019 and 2023 gubernatorial elections, but Republican for all other statewide offices.

=== Elected officials ===
Elected officials as of January 3, 2025
U.S. House	Hal Rogers (R)	KY 5
Ky. Senate	Brandon Smith (R)	30
Ky. House	John Blanton (R)	92

== Economy ==
The last active coal mine in Magoffin County closed in 2015. In 2022, the TipTop Coal Mine in Magoffin County reopened, making it now the only coal mine in the county. Major employers now include several coal-truck businesses.

== Communities ==
=== City ===
- Salyersville (county seat)

=== Unincorporated communities ===
* Bethanna
- Burning Fork
- Cisco
- Cutuno
- Duco
- Edna
- Elsie
- Ever
- Falcon
- Flat Fork
- Foraker
- Fredville
- Fritz
- Gapville
- Gunlock
- Gypsy
- Harper
- Hendricks
- Ivyton
- Lickburg
- Logville
- Maggard
- Marshallville
- Mashfork
- Mason
- Ova
- Plutarch
- Royalton
- Sublett
- Swampton
- Wheelersburg
- Wonnie

== Education ==
One school district serves the county - Magoffin County School District. The District includes Magoffin County High School.

== Notable people ==
- Jimmy Flynt, co-founder of Hustler magazine
- Larry Flynt, publisher of Hustler magazine
- Samuel Wilber Hager, Kentucky state treasurer from 1900 to 1904, Kentucky state auditor from 1904 to 1908, and Democratic nominee for governor of Kentucky in 1907

== See also ==
- Big Sandy Area Development District
- National Register of Historic Places listings in Magoffin County, Kentucky
