= Salyersville, Kentucky =

- City
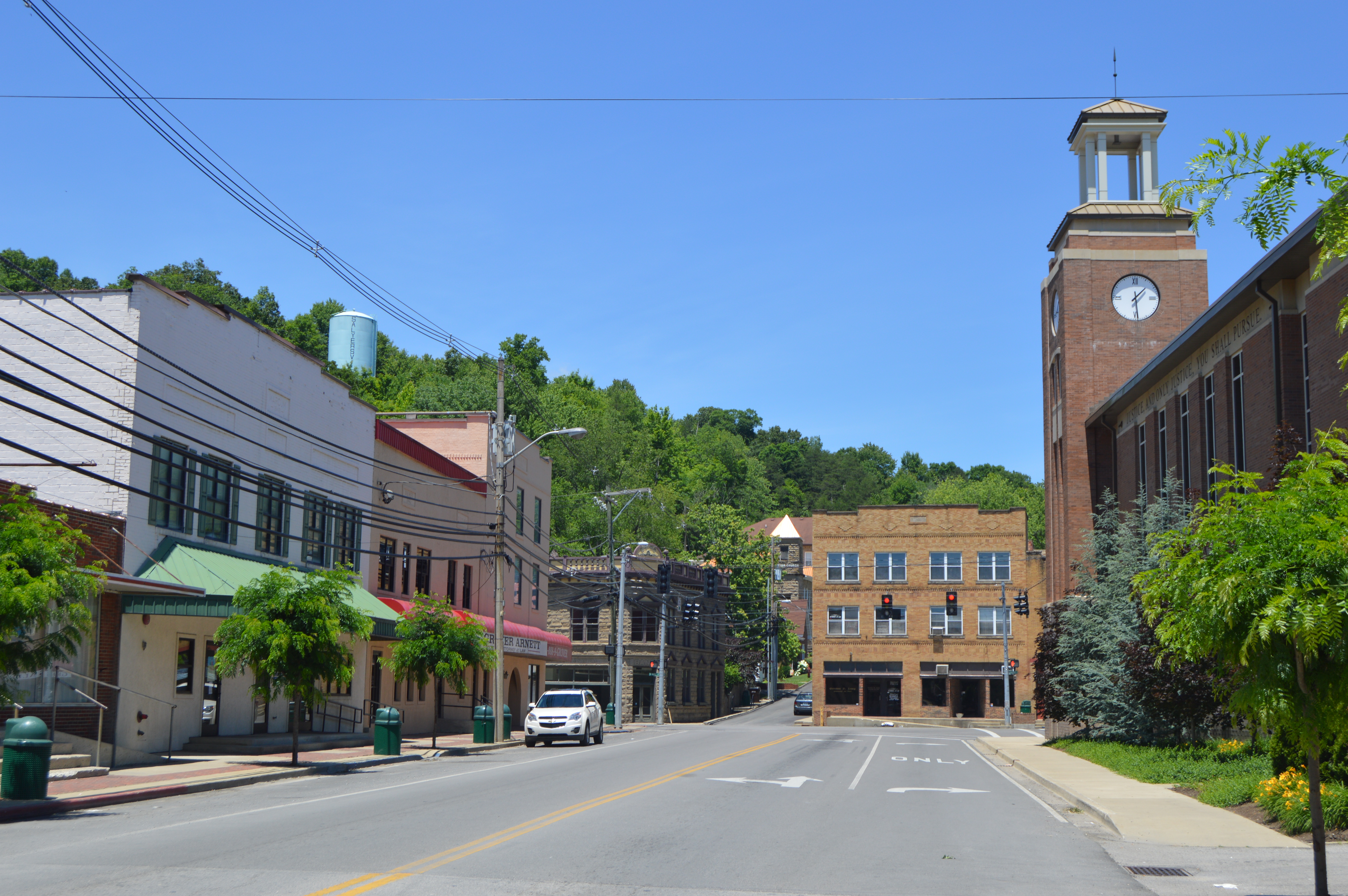
- Downtown Salyersville
- Nickname: "The Gateway to Appalachia"
- Location in Magoffin County, Kentucky
- Coordinates: 37°44′53″N 83°3′47″W
- Country: United States
- State: Kentucky
- County: Magoffin
- Established: 1860
- Incorporated: March 2, 1867
- Named for: Samuel Salyer, a lawmaker who sponsored the establishment of Magoffin Co.

Government
  - Mayor: Stanley Howard

Area
  - Total: 2.49 sq mi (6.45 km^{2})
  - Land: 2.47 sq mi (6.39 km^{2})
  - Water: 0.023 sq mi (0.06 km^{2})
- Elevation: 850 ft (260 m)

Population (2020)
  - Total: 1,591
  - Estimate (2022): 1,546
  - Density: 644.5/sq mi (248.85/km^{2})
- Time zone: UTC-5 (Eastern (EST))
  - Summer (DST): UTC-4 (EDT)
- ZIP code: 41465
- Area code: 606
- FIPS code: 21-68232
- GNIS feature ID: 0502868
- Website: www.cityofsalyersville.org

Salyersville (/ˈsæljərzvəl/) is a home rule-class city on the Licking River in Magoffin County, Kentucky, United States. It is the county seat. As of the 2020 census, its population was 1,591, down from 1,883 in 2010.

== History ==
=== Early history ===
The hill overlooking the bend of the Licking River just downriver from the present town was fortified and settled c. 1800 by Archibald Prater, Ebenezer Hanna, Clayton Cook and others. Originally known as "Prater's Fort", the community had become "Licking Station" by the time of its first post office in 1839.

In 1849, the post office was moved to the community at site of the present city and renamed "Adamsville" after local landowner Uncle William Adams. In addition to his farmland, Adams operated a hotel, a gristmill, a tannery, and a blacksmithy at the new location.

In 1860, Magoffin County was formed from parts of the surrounding Floyd, Johnson, and Morgan Counties. Billy Adams donated land for the platting and establishment of a new county seat, and the community was renamed "Salyersville" in gratitude to State Rep. Samuel Salyer, who sponsored the bill creating the new county. The post office changed the following year.

During the Civil War, Salyersville fell on hard times. Because of its location in the Upper South and its history of settlement by migrants and farmers from Virginia, some residents sided with the Confederacy, despite the general lack of slaves in the area. In 1864, Union forces defeated a Confederate raiding force in the Battle of Salyersville.

Adams gave more land to the city in 1871 for the construction of a proper courthouse. It was completed in 1890 and stood for 67 years before burning to the ground in 1957.

=== 20th century ===
Salyersville's first high school, the Magoffin County Institute, was founded in 1908 by A.C. Harlowe.

The Great Depression hit Salyersville hard, since such a high percentage of Salyersville's citizens were laborers or farmers, who saw prices for crops fall from 40 to 60%. Nearby mining and logging operations also closed or limited production when demand for their products fell sharply.

In 1939, floods in February and July caused extensive property damage. During the July event, the Licking River crested over 25 ft (7.6 m).

The Mountain Parkway opened in 1963, stretching west 76 mi (122 km) from Salyersville to intersect with Interstate 64 at a point just east of Winchester. It enabled more tourists to visit the area, and heritage tourism began to help Salyersville develop a changed economy.

The first Magoffin County Founder's Day Festival was held in 1979; the annual event continued until 2015.

In the winter of 1997, as part of Kentucky's elk restoration project, Salyersville became one of the locations selected for the release of elk into the wilderness area of its mountains.

=== 21st century ===
Between 2002 and 2006, the third Magoffin County courthouse (erected in 1959) was demolished and replaced with a new Magoffin County Justice Center.

On March 2, 2012, Salyersville was hit by a tornado, which caused extensive damage to many businesses and homes. No deaths were reported in Salyersville. The tornado was reported to be an EF3. Kentucky Governor Steve Beshear visited Salyersville and toured the eastern part of the state after the tornado outbreak.

== Geography ==
Salyersville is in central Magoffin County at 37°44'53" north, 83°3'47" west (37.748171, -83.062984), in the valley of the Licking River, where it is joined from the northeast by the State Road Fork and from the southeast by the Burning Fork. The Licking River is a direct tributary of the Ohio River, joining it at Covington, Kentucky.

U.S. Route 460 passes through the center of Salyersville as Parkway Drive, South Church Street, and West Maple Street. US 460 leads northwest (downriver) 22 miles (35 km) to West Liberty and east 19 mi (31 km) to Paintsville. Kentucky Route 7 passes through downtown Salyersville with US 460, but leads southeast 36 mi (58 km) to Wayland. Kentucky Route 40 runs northeast out of Salyersville and also leads to Paintsville, reaching it in 18 mi (29 km).

According to the United States Census Bureau, the city of Salyersville has a total area of 2.49 square miles (6.45 km^{2}), of which 0.02 sq mi (0.05 km^{2}) (0.96% or about 13 ac) is covered by water.

=== Climate ===
The climate in this area is characterized by relatively high temperatures and evenly distributed precipitation throughout the year. The Köppen climate classification describes the weather as humid subtropical, designated as Cfa on climate maps.

== Demographics ==
Historical population
Census	Pop.	Note	%±
1870	106		—
1890	339		—
1900	265		−21.8%
1910	310		17.0%
1920	412		32.9%
1930	446		8.3%
1940	1,254		181.2%
1950	1,174		−6.4%
1960	1,173		−0.1%
1970	1,196		2.0%
1980	1,352		13.0%
1990	1,917		41.8%
2000	1,604		−16.3%
2010	1,883		17.4%
2020	1,591		−15.5%
2022 (est.)	1,546		−2.8%
U.S. Decennial Census

=== 2020 census ===
As of the 2020 census, Salyersville had a population of 1,591. The median age was 43.8 years. 22.4% of residents were under the age of 18 and 21.9% of residents were 65 years of age or older. For every 100 females there were 89.0 males, and for every 100 females age 18 and over there were 80.1 males age 18 and over.

0.0% of residents lived in urban areas, while 100.0% lived in rural areas.

There were 673 households in Salyersville, of which 33.1% had children under the age of 18 living in them. Of all households, 32.5% were married-couple households, 20.5% were households with a male householder and no spouse or partner present, and 40.7% were households with a female householder and no spouse or partner present. About 41.1% of all households were made up of individuals and 16.2% had someone living alone who was 65 years of age or older.

There were 788 housing units, of which 14.6% were vacant. The homeowner vacancy rate was 0.8% and the rental vacancy rate was 11.4%.

Racial composition as of the 2020 census
Race	Number	Percent
White	1,550	97.4%
Black or African American	0	0.0%
American Indian and Alaska Native	6	0.4%
Asian	2	0.1%
Native Hawaiian and Other Pacific Islander	1	0.1%
Some other race	2	0.1%
Two or more races	30	1.9%
Hispanic or Latino (of any race)	14	0.9%

=== 2000 census ===
As of the 2000 census, 1,604 people, 646 households, and 414 families were residing in the city. The population density was 758.1 inhabitants per square mile (292.7/km^{2}). The 710 housing units had an average density of 335.6 per square mile (129.6/km^{2}). The racial makeup of the city was 99.69% White, 0.06% African American, and 0.25% Native American. 0.31% of the population were Hispanics or Latinos of any race.

Of the 646 households, 27.9% had children under 18 living with them, 49.4% were married couples living together, 12.2% had a female householder with no husband present, and 35.9% were not families. About 33.9% of all households were made up of individuals, and 14.9% had someone living alone who was 65 or older. The average household size was 2.22 and the average family size was 2.85.

In the city, the age distribution was 20.8% under 18, 9.2% from 18 to 24, 26.1% from 25 to 44, 24.1% from 45 to 64, and 19.8% who were 65 or older. The median age was 41 years. For every 100 females, there were 88.9 males. For every 100 females 18 and over, there were 83.1 males.

The median income for a household in the city was $16,042, and for a family was $23,393. Males had a median income of $26,534 versus $20,188 for females. The per capita income for the city was $11,881. About 35.7% of families and 40.7% of the population were below the poverty line, including 56.4% of those under 18 and 34.3% of those 65 and older.

== Economy ==
Major employers included the manufacturing company Joy Mining Machinery, which closed its Salyersville plant in 2015. Major employers now include Logan Machinery, which opened in 2016, hiring around 70 people from the area. Coal mining was once a major employer in Salyersville, but the last mine in Magoffin County, U.S. Coal, shut down in 2019. Most of Salyersville's economic income is sourced out of town, in nearby areas, such as Georgetown, and Lexington, by the likes of tradesman. The biggest contributor to the workforce in the city is the school system.

== Arts and culture ==
=== Cultural events and fairs ===
- Founders' Day, an annual county festival for the people of Magoffin County, attracts those who have roots in Eastern Kentucky and others who are interested in the genealogy and history of the area. A different family surname is celebrated each year as part of the festival. The festival offers young people opportunities to enter contests and win prize money for excelling in academic subjects such as math, spelling, essay writing, and art. Pageants are held for young people from neonates to 14 for boys and girls and for young women from 17 to 26. A parade, drama and fashion shows, pet shows, clogging, other dance exhibitions, and specialty acts are just a few of the festivities that are part of Founders' Day.

Founder's Day Theme
by year:
- 1982 - Patrick
- 1983 - Arnett
- 1984 - Conley
- 1985 - Howard
- 1986 - Bailey
- 1987 - Wireman
- 1988 - Montgomery
- 1989 - Allen
- 1990 - Reed
- 1991 - Minix
- 1992 - May
- 1993 - Risner
- 1994 - Lykins
- 1995 - Williams
- 1996 - Helton
- 1997 - Jenkins
- 1998 - The Civil War
- 1999 - Shepherd
- 2000 - Magoffin County
- 2001 - Vanderpool
- 2002 - Miller
- 2003 - Gullet
- 2004 - Whitaker
- 2005 - Hammond
- 2006 - Veterans
- 2007 - Carpenter
- 2008 - Fletcher
- 2009 - Mann
- 2010 - Magoffin County 150th
- 2011 - Joseph
- 2012 - Marshall

- Street Dance, a public square dance, is held each year in downtown Salyersville. The intersection surrounding the downtown courthouse is blocked off for the event, which lasts well into the night.
- The Independence Day Festival celebrates July 4 with a parade and pageants.

=== Museums ===
Pioneer Village is a complex of 15 original log cabins located near downtown Salyersville that have been restored and preserved through the efforts of the Magoffin County Historical Society. Together, the cabins form a living history museum, where staff members create displays and demonstrations of early crafts. The cabins in Pioneer Village often date back to the early 19th century. Donated cabins are disassembled with care, the logs numbered and cleaned, and are transported and reassembled in the Pioneer Village.

=== Monuments ===
Several marble monuments are located downtown near the Pioneer Village cabins, including the Founders' Pyramid, a surname marker, a county marker, a Civil War memorial, and a memorial soldier's bell. The George "Golden Hawk" Sizemore grave and monument sits at the entrance of Oakly Cemetery, and the Tip Top coal camp marker sits at the head of the creek.

=== Historical markers ===
- The Civil War Action marker, located near Puncheon Creek in Salyersville, states: "On mission to clear area of CSA forces, Col. Geo. W. Gallup with USA troops repulsed Confederate attack led by Lt. Colonel E. F. Clay at Paintsville April 13, 1864, and pursued enemy to this point. Union men attacked next day. Clay was mortally wounded: CSA suffered 60 casualties and 60 men, 200 horses, 400 saddles, 300 small arms taken. USA sustained only slight losses."
- The County Named, 1860 marker, located in downtown Salyersville, describes the biography of Gov. Beriah Magoffin, the county namesake.
- The First Settlement marker at the eastern Salyersville city limits describes the founding of the town by European Americans.
- The Ivy Point Skirmishes marker on Ivy Point Hill tells of skirmishes during the Civil War.
- The Reuben Patrick Grave marker notes a Civil War action by Patrick, who also served as a Kentucky state legislator, 1863–1867.
- The Wm. "Uncle Billie" Adams marker in the downtown tells a short biography of one of the founders.

=== Parks ===
Ramey Memorial Park offers picnic shelters, picnic tables, a playground, a walking track, basketball courts, tennis courts, and baseball fields, as well as a swimming pool (open during the summer). The park has access to a steel bridge that crosses the Licking River, connecting the park to the historic Pioneer Village and a monument commemorating veterans of war from Magoffin County.

== Education ==
Salyersville's public schools are operated by the Magoffin County Board of Education. Public schools in the city include Magoffin County High School (mascot: the Hornets), Herald Whitaker Middle School, North Magoffin Elementary, Salyersville Elementary School, and South Magoffin Elementary.

The Magoffin County Career and Technical Center teaches students tradesman skills in the fields of welding, electrical work, carpentry, law enforcement, agriculture, and medical services.

Salyersville has a lending library, the Magoffin County Public Library.

== Media ==
The local weekly newspapers in Salyersville include The Salyersville Independent, founded in 1921; its circulation is over 4,000 copies every Thursday. It is currently owned and published by Ritt Mortimer. The Trading Post is a circular mostly for advertising.

Cable service in Salyersville is provided by Rick Howard Cable, Frank Howard Cable, and Foothills Cooperative. Through these companies, Salyersville is provided with standard and premium cable TV service, high-speed Internet access, and telephone service. Frank Howard Cable and Rick Howard Cable offer local programming viaMagoffin County Television (MCTV) and MC School TV, a channel dedicated to local school programming. MCTV carries a daily local news media program Your News Today, a nightly local news broadcast that airs on Howard's Cable and Foothills Communication. It was started in 1998 by Ritt Mortimer.

Salyersville's radio stations include the local WRLV Pure Country 106.5. Stations of surrounding counties can also be heard, such as Prestonsburg's WQHY (FM) 95.5, Paintsville's WKLW (FM) 94.7, and West Liberty's Kick 102.9.

== Notable people ==
- John Blanton, American politician born in Salyersville
- Jimmy Flynt, co-founder of Hustler magazine
- Larry Flynt, publisher of Hustler magazine
- Buell Kazee, bluegrass singer, minister
- Rebecca Lynn Howard, country singer
- Charlie Sizemore, bluegrass singer, songwriter
