= List of census-designated places in Kentucky =

Map of the United States with Kentucky highlighted

This page lists census-designated places (CDPs) in the U.S. state of Kentucky. As of 2022, there were a total of 135 census-designated places in Kentucky.

== Census-designated places ==
CDP	Population	County
Ages	345	Harlan
Allensville	175	Todd
Annville	1,102	Jackson
Anthoston	225	Henderson
Arjay	183	Bell
Artemus	453	Knox
Auxier	715	Floyd
Bandana	177	Ballard
Beech Grove	282	McLean
Beechmont	776	Muhlenberg
Belfry	263	Pike
Belleview	308	Boone
Betsy Layne	651	Floyd
Big Clifty	367	Grayson
Boston	253	Nelson
Breckinridge Center	1,282	Union
Brooks	2,469	Bullitt
Buckner	5,785	Oldham
Buffalo	571	LaRue
Burlington	17,318	Boone
Burna	219	Livingston
Cannonsburg	862	Boyd
Cawood	630	Harlan
Cayce	1219	Fulton
Cecilia	575	Hardin
Cerulean	303	Christian & Trigg
Chaplin	440	Nelson
Claryville	2,992	Campbell
Cleaton	168	Muhlenberg
Coldiron	222	Harlan
Combs	339	Perry
Coxton	176	Harlan
Crayne	161	Crittenden
Cunningham	272	Carlisle
Curdsville	94	Daviess
Dexter	257	Calloway
Diablock	409	Perry
Doe Valley	2,270	Meade
Dunmor	322	Logan and Muhlenberg
Dwale	239	Floyd
East Bernstadt	809	Laurel
Elizaville	190	Fleming
Elk Creek	1,986	Spencer
Emlyn	417	Whitley
Ezel	209	Morgan
Fairview	258	Christian and Todd
Fancy Farm	403	Graves
Farley	4,374	McCracken
Farmers	243	Rowan
Farmington	234	Graves
Flat Lick	850	Knox
Fort Campbell North	12,825	Christian
Fort Knox	7,742	Hardin and Meade
Francisville	9,952	Boone
Freeburn	296	Pike
Garrison	731	Lewis
Gilbertsville	332	Marshall
Gracey	117	Christian
Hardyville	155	Hart
Hazel Green	173	Wolfe
Hebron	6,195	Boone
Hendron	4,774	McCracken
Hickory	235	Graves
High Bridge	268	Jessamine
Hiseville	246	Barren
Ironville	782	Boyd
Jeff	293	Perry
Kenvir	204	Harlan
Knottsville	183	Daviess
Ledbetter	1,836	Livingston
Lovelaceville	124	Ballard
Lowes	92	Graves
Maceo	404	Daviess
Magnolia	535	LaRue
Manitou	173	Hopkins
Marrowbone	147	Cumberland
Masonville	2,129	Daviess
Massac	4,635	McCracken
Mayking	475	Letcher
Mays Lick	252	Mason
Maytown	227	Floyd
McCarr	158	Pike
McDowell	661	Floyd
McKinney	201	Lincoln
McRoberts	741	Letcher
Millstone	92	Letcher
Moseleyville	470	Daviess
New Hope	139	Nelson
North Corbin	1,727	Knox and Laurel
Oakbrook	9,268	Boone
Oneida	238	Clay
Onton	138	Webster
Panther	144	Daviess
Pathfork	326	Harlan
Payne Gap	347	Letcher
Petersburg	500	Boone
Phelps	760	Pike
Philpot	991	Daviess
Pine Knot	1,380	McCreary
Plano	1,223	Warren
Pleasant Ridge	578	Daviess and Ohio
Pleasant View	326	Whitley
Poole	354	Webster and Henderson
Pryorsburg	262	Graves
Rabbit Hash	254	Boone
Reidland	4,526	McCracken
Rineyville	3,039	Hardin
Rockholds	330	Whitley
Rosine	110	Ohio
Salvisa	410	Mercer
Saint Joseph	110	Daviess
Sedalia	279	Graves
Sorgho	1,972	Daviess
South Wallins	838	Harlan
South Williamson	562	Pike
Spottsville	274	Henderson
Stanley	309	Daviess
Stearns	1,365	McCreary
Summer Shade	294	Metcalfe
Summersville	551	Green
Symsonia	622	Graves
Thruston	2,234	Daviess
Tolu	81	Crittenden
Utica	298	Daviess
Van Lear	893	Johnson
Verona	1,545	Boone
Virgie	274	Pike
Wallins Creek	212	Harlan
Water Valley	235	Graves
West Louisville	40	Daviess
Westport	268	Oldham
West Van Lear	768	Johnson
Westwood	4,387	Boyd
Whitley City	968	McCreary
Yelvington	437	Daviess

== See also ==
- List of cities in Kentucky
- List of counties in Kentucky
