= Alpheus F. Haymond =

American judge (1823–1893)

Alpheus Franklin Haymond (December 15, 1823, near Fairmont, Marion County, in what was then the state of Virginia – December 15, 1893) was an American lawyer, politician, and justice of the Supreme Court of Appeals of West Virginia from 1872 to the beginning of 1883.

Haymond was the son of Thomas Haymond, a lawyer and one-term U.S. Congressman. After attending an academy in Morgantown and spending a few terms at the College of William & Mary, he studied law with Edgar C. Wilson and was admitted to the bar in 1842 at the age of 19. In 1853 and 1857 he was elected to represent Marion County in the Virginia House of Delegates. He was a delegate to the Virginia Secession Convention of 1861 and voted against secession, but followed his father into the service of the Confederate army, serving as a field commissary in Early's Brigade.

Following the war he formed a law partnership with Aretas B. Fleming, who was later governor. Haymond's right to practice law was restored by a special act of the legislature in 1868, and Congress restored his right to hold office. In 1872 he was elected to the convention tasked with revising the West Virginia Constitution. In the election which enacted the constitution he was elected as a Democrat to the Supreme Court of Appeals. He was re-elected in 1876, but resigned January 1, 1883 to return to private practice.

Haymond married Maria Boggess (1828–1918); they had many children. Their son William Stanley Haymond (1852–1928) became a lawyer and was elected to the 14th Circuit Court in West Virginia, serving from 1913 to 1921. Another son, Thomas S. Haymond (1869–1954), was a coal company executive influential in the development of Letcher County, Kentucky; the settlement of Haymond there is named after him.
