= National Register of Historic Places listings in Letcher County, Kentucky =

Location of Letcher County in Kentucky

This is a list of the National Register of Historic Places listings in Letcher County, Kentucky.

It is intended to be a complete list of the properties on the National Register of Historic Places in Letcher County, Kentucky, United States. The locations of National Register properties for which the latitude and longitude coordinates are included below, may be seen in a map.

There are 5 properties listed on the National Register in the county. Another property was once listed but has been removed.

This National Park Service list is complete through NPS recent listings posted April 18, 2025.

== Current listings ==
	Name on the Register	Image	Datelisted	Location	City or town	Description
1	David Back Log House and Farm	David Back Log House and Farm	April 24, 2019 (#100003680)	Elk Creek Rd. 37°10′00″N 82°58′08″W	Blackey	
2	C.B. Caudill Store	C.B. Caudill Store	January 4, 2001 (#00001597)	7822 Kentucky Route 7 S. 37°08′23″N 82°58′54″W	Blackey	
3	Dunham High School		April 15, 2025 (#100011679)	#4 Hollow off Hwy 805; 37°10′25″N 82°38′01″W	Jenkins	
4	Jenkins School	Jenkins School	February 11, 2011 (#11000004)	75 Pane St. 37°10′21″N 82°37′56″W	Jenkins	
5	Whitesburg Historic District	Whitesburg Historic District	September 12, 2006 (#06000813)	Portions of Main St., Broadway, Bentley, Webb, and Hayes Aves., Church, Pine, Cowan, Madison Sts., River Rd., and Hazard Rd; 37°07′04″N 82°49′31″W	Whitesburg	

== Former listing ==
	Name on the Register	Image	Date listed	Date removed	Location	City or town	Description
1	Kingdom Come Creek School		June 11, 1975 (#75000793)	July 5, 1990	5 miles southwest of Whitesburg off Kentucky Route 588	Whitesburg	

== See also ==
- List of National Historic Landmarks in Kentucky
- National Register of Historic Places listings in Kentucky
