= Marat Moore =

Writer and activist

Marat Moore was born in Johnson City, Tennessee. She is an American author, labor organizer, and former coal miner known for her work advocating for the rights of miners, particularly women in mining.

== Biography ==
Moore grew up in Johnson City, Tennessee. In 1977 she received her undergraduate degree in English from Duke University. She went on to earn a master's degree in liberal arts. She worked as a reporter for the Johnson City Press-Chronicle, and her early work included investigating the 1975 accident that occurred at the Scotia Mine. Working on the story piqued her interest in coal mines and mining. After college she continued to work for newspapers, and reported on strikes by coal miners.

Moore started working as a coal miner in 1979, and later described the gender discrimination she experienced while working in the mines.

As of 1984 Moore worked for the United Mine Workers of America as an associate editor and photographer for their publication, UMW Journal. While working for the United Mine Workers, her work included investigations into mine safety in Virginia. She was fired by the United Mine Workers, and in 1998 she won the legal case challenging her termination.

Moore also wrote for the academic publication, Now and Then, which centers on issues central to Appalachia. There she has written about the movie Matewan, about a coal miners' strike Virginia, and on strikes led by the United Mine Workers of America. As of 1997 Moore was editing a newsletter for the American Speech–Language–Hearing Association.

Moore started researching her book about women who work in coal mines in 1980. The book, Women in the Mines: Stories of Life and Work, was published in 1996. The book is a collection of oral histories and personal narratives from women who worked in the coal mines.

Moore was also involved in labor organizing, advocating for miners' rights, and training for women in the coal mining industry. By 2006, Moore considered why there were continued decreases in the number of women involved in coal mining.

== Honors and awards ==
In 2024 she received Truth Teller Award for her as a recognition for her work on documentation of history of labor activism.
