= Blackey, Kentucky =

- Unincorporated community
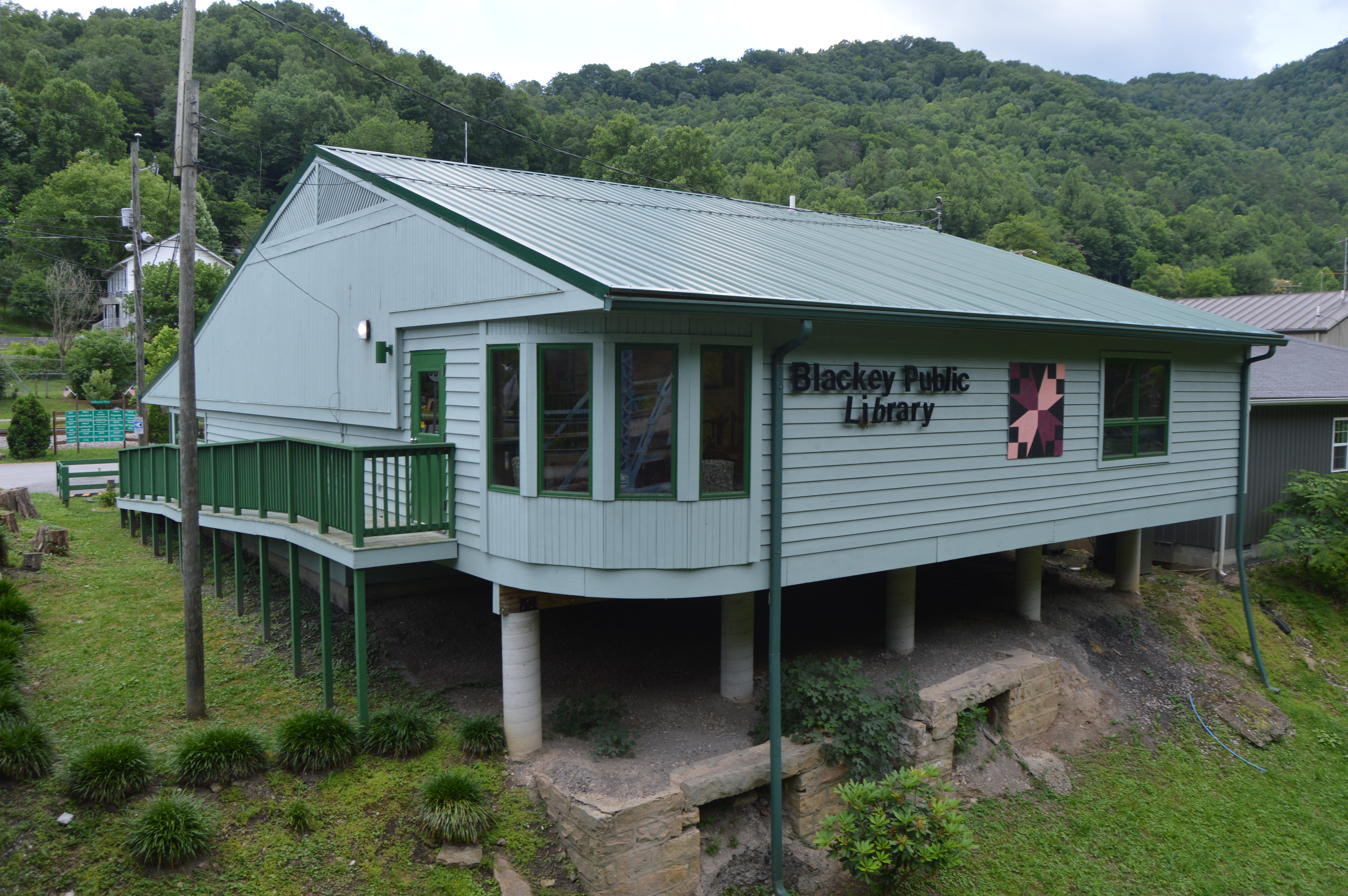
- Blackey Public Library

- Location in Letcher County, Kentucky
- Coordinates: 37°8′25″N 82°58′46″W
- Country: United States
- State: Kentucky
- County: Letcher
- Incorporated: January 27, 1915
- Dissolved: July 19, 2022

Area
  - Total: 0.45 sq mi (1.16 km^{2})
  - Land: 0.44 sq mi (1.13 km^{2})
  - Water: 0.012 sq mi (0.03 km^{2})
- Elevation: 1,007 ft (307 m)

Population (2020)
  - Total: 109
  - Density: 249.3/sq mi (96.27/km^{2})
- Time zone: UTC-5 (Eastern (EST))
  - Summer (DST): UTC-4 (EDT)
- ZIP code: 41804
- Area code: 606
- FIPS code: 21-07012
- GNIS feature ID: 0507346

Blackey is an unincorporated community in Letcher County, Kentucky, in the United States. As of the 2020 census, Blackey had a population of 109. It is located near the early settlement of Indian Bottom. Blackey is thought to have been named after Blackey Brown, one of its citizens.

== History ==
The history of Blackey began in 1908, after local resident Jim Brown was given permission to establish a post office on Elk Creek. He decided to name the post office "Blackey", after his brother Joseph "Blackey" Brown. Due to the area's massive coal deposits, the Lexington and Eastern Railroad ran a line through Blackey in November 1912. Over the next fifteen years, Blackey was transformed from a sleepy mountain town to a bustling modern city. It was chartered in November 1912 and incorporated on January 27, 1915. In 1913, the community became the home of the Stuart Robinson School, a Presbyterian settlement school that was to operate there until 1957. In 1917, the Blackey Coal Company was established as the first coal company in the community. The company constructed thirty houses and employed eighty miners.

In May 1927, a flash flood devastated the city. In one hour, the North Fork of the Kentucky River rose 18 feet (5.5 m), killing 26 people in Letcher County alone. Later in December a fire broke out, destroying most of the city's business district. Then in February 1928, another fire broke out and destroyed the rest of the town. Shortly afterwards, Blackey State Bank failed and the Great Depression ended the prosperity of the boom town.

Today, Blackey is home to just over 150 people, with only a few abandoned buildings and a few occupied homes on Main Street. Within the last few years, the city has seen some revitalization consisting of a Head Start, a new city water system, and a public library.

The town dissolved in 2022.

== Geography ==
Blackey is located in western Letcher County at 37°8′25″N 82°58′46″W (37.140413, -82.979368), in the valley of the North Fork of the Kentucky River. Kentucky Route 7 passes through the town, leading west and northwest down the North Fork valley 19 miles (31 km) to Jeff, and northeast up the valley of Rockhouse Creek then north down the valley of the Right Fork of Beaver Creek 40 miles (64 km) to Wayland. Kentucky Route 588 leads south and east up the North Fork of the Kentucky 15 miles (24 km) to Whitesburg, the Letcher county seat.

According to the United States Census Bureau, the city of Blackey has a total area of 0.45 square miles (1.16 km^{2}), including 0.01 square miles (0.03 km^{2}) of water (2.72%).

== Demographics ==
Historical population
| Census | Pop. | Note | %± |
|---|---|---|---|
| 1920 | 269 | | — |
| 1930 | 349 | | 29.7% |
| 1940 | 545 | | 56.2% |
| 1950 | 393 | | −27.9% |
| 2000 | 153 | | — |
| 2010 | 120 | | −21.6% |
| 2020 | 109 | | −9.2% |
U.S. Decennial Census

As of the census of 2000, there were 153 people, 65 households, and 49 families residing in the city. The population density was 314.6 inhabitants per square mile (121.5/km^{2}). There were 73 housing units at an average density of 150.1 per square mile (58.0/km^{2}). The racial makeup of the city was 98.69% White and 1.31% from two or more races.

There were 65 households, out of which 23.1% had children under the age of 18 living with them, 60.0% were married couples living together, 10.8% had a female householder with no husband present, and 23.1% were non-families. 21.5% of all households were made up of individuals, and 6.2% had someone living alone who was 65 years of age or older. The average household size was 2.35 and the average family size was 2.66.

In the city, the population was spread out, with 17.0% under the age of 18, 11.8% from 18 to 24, 24.8% from 25 to 44, 34.0% from 45 to 64, and 12.4% who were 65 years of age or older. The median age was 42 years. For every 100 females, there were 86.6 males. For every 100 females age 18 and over, there were 95.4 males.

The median income for a household in the city was $19,250, and the median income for a family was $20,625. Males had a median income of $30,536 versus $21,875 for females. The per capita income for the city was $11,278. About 22.9% of families and 24.3% of the population were below the poverty line, including 28.1% of those under the age of eighteen and 33.3% of those 65 or over.

== Education ==
Blackey has a lending library, a branch of the Letcher County Library.

== Arts and culture ==
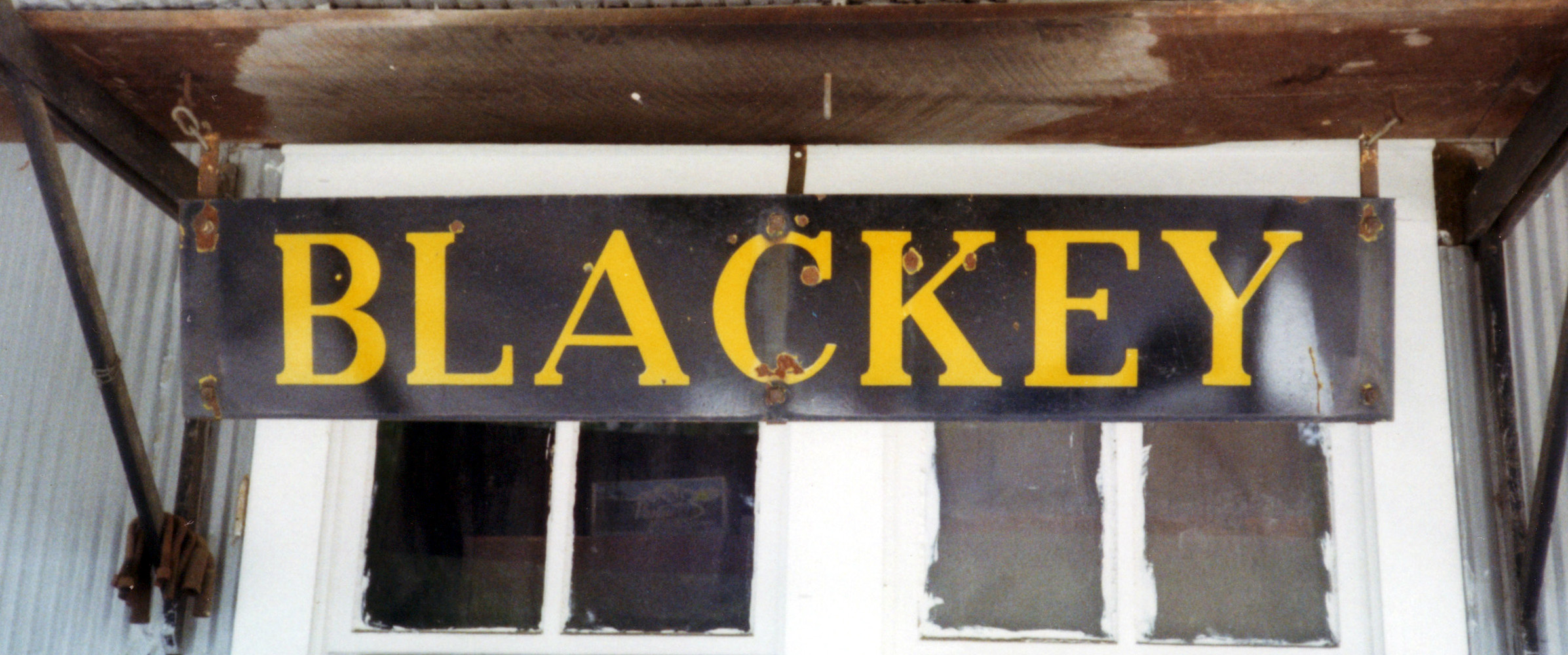
Disused railroad sign (possibly c. 1930s) bearing the inscription "BLACKEY." Photo taken on the porch of the C. B. Caudill Store in Blackey, Kentucky, summer 1998.

Just across a small bridge is the C. B. Caudill Store & History Center, which was operated by Joe Begley (1919–2000) and his wife Gaynell (1917–2008). It was formerly a general store but has been converted into a history and community center.
