= Lilley Cornett Woods =

Forested land parcel within Letcher County, Kentucky

- Location within Kentucky
- Location: Whitesburg, Kentucky
- Coordinates: 37.0879°N 82.9925°W
- Area: 659 acres (267 ha)
- Established: 1969
- Governing body: Eastern Kentucky University

U.S. National Natural Landmark
- Designated: 1971

Lilley Cornett Woods is a 659-acre forested land parcel within Letcher County, Kentucky. Of the overall parcel, 252 acres are classified as old growth forest and listed as a National Natural Landmark (NNL). The overall parcel is owned by the State of Kentucky, and the NNL is protected by the parcel's operator, Eastern Kentucky University.

== Description ==
The Lilley Cornett Woods are a surviving example of the forest growth of the Cumberland Mountains. Dominant large trees include beech, hickory, white oak, and chestnut oak. Eastern Kentucky University, which operates the Appalachian Ecological Research Station within the parcel, reports that the parcel contains 72 woody plant species and 468 other plant species. This diversity affirms the old-growth status of the central wooded area within the parcel. Prior to 1969, the old-growth area was disturbed by (i) longtime livestock-forestry interactions typical of Appalachian human ecology, and (ii) 20th-century salvage logging of the blight-struck, dead and dying American chestnuts that used to live in the old-growth woods.

Surviving large trees in the old-growth section of the Lilley Cornett Woods include a white oak that has been tree-ring-dated to 1669, more than 350 years before the present. The Woods are named in honor of the parcel's longtime owner and guardian, a private citizen who is reported to have refused all offers from loggers. As a surviving old-growth woodland, the Woods were celebrated by local environmental advocate Harry M. Caudill. The state of Kentucky purchased the old-growth section of the land parcel from Cornett's heirs in 1969.

The Lilley Cornett Woods are managed with minimal additional human disturbance for scientific purposes. Researchers have a bunkhouse/laboratory station to maintain their research projects. Non-scientist access to the old-growth segment of the Woods is by guided tour only. A self-guided 0.5-mile loop trail invites unsupervised access to a verge section of the Woods adjacent to the old growth. The Woods were named as a National Natural Landmark in 1971. They were initiated into the Old-Growth Forest Network in 2023.
