= Skyline, Kentucky =

Unincorporated community in Kentucky, United States

- Unincorporated community
- Location in Kentucky Location in the United States
- Coordinates: 37°4′33″N 82°58′54″W
- Country: United States
- State: Kentucky
- County: Letcher
- Elevation: 1,076 ft (328 m)
- Time zone: UTC-5 (Eastern (EST))
  - Summer (DST): UTC-4 (EDT)
- ZIP codes: 41851
- GNIS feature ID: 509072

Skyline is an unincorporated community located in Letcher County, Kentucky, United States. Its post office is closed.

== Climate ==
The climate in this area is characterized by relatively high temperatures and evenly distributed precipitation throughout the year. The Köppen Climate System describes the weather as humid subtropical, and uses the abbreviation Cfa.
