= Little Colly, Kentucky =

Unincorporated community in Kentucky, United States

- Unincorporated community
- Location in Kentucky Location in the United States
- Coordinates: 37°11′4″N 82°52′22″W
- Country: United States
- State: Kentucky
- County: Letcher
- Elevation: 1,184 ft (361 m)
- Time zone: UTC-5 (Eastern (EST))
  - Summer (DST): UTC-4 (EDT)
- GNIS feature ID: 2336150

Little Colly is an unincorporated community located in Letcher County, Kentucky, United States.
