= Whitco, Kentucky =

Unincorporated community in Kentucky, United States

- Unincorporated community
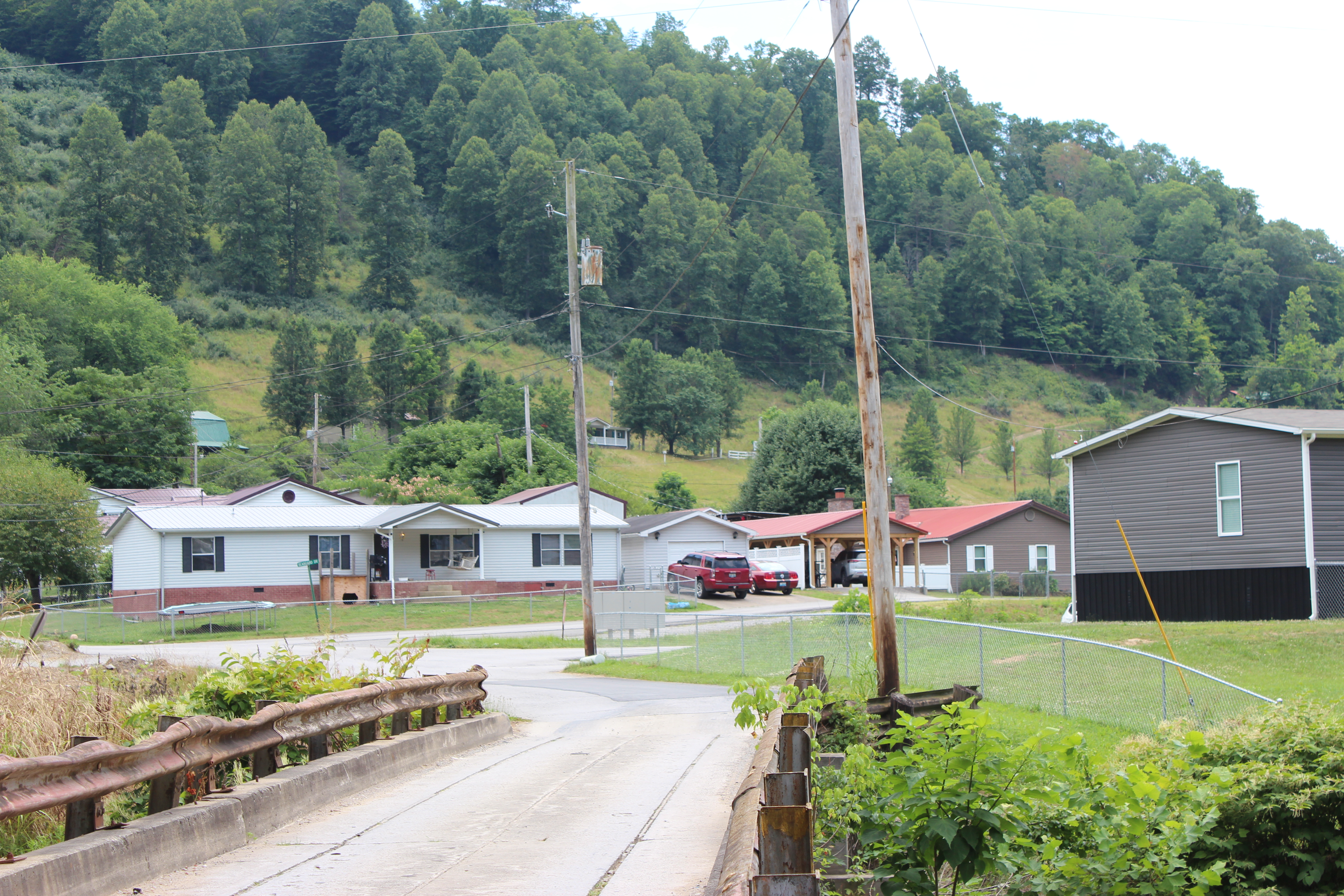
- Houses in Whitco

- Location in Kentucky Location in the United States
- Coordinates: 37°7′10″N 82°51′5″W
- Country: United States
- State: Kentucky
- County: Letcher
- Elevation: 1,138 ft (347 m)
- Time zone: UTC-5 (Eastern (EST))
  - Summer (DST): UTC-4 (EDT)
- GNIS feature ID: 506570

Whitco is an unincorporated community and coal town in Letcher County, Kentucky, United States. A post office operated in Whitco from 1918 to 1933.
