= Killing of Kevin Mullins =

2024 homicide in Kentucky, U.S.

- Stines aiming his handgun at Mullins
- Location: 37.1181°N 82.8267°W; Whitesburg, Kentucky
- Date: September 19, 2024; 2:52 P.M. (EDT)
- Attack type: Shooting
- Weapon: Handgun
- Victim: Kevin R. Mullins
- Motive: Under investigation
- Accused: Mickey Stines
- Charges: First-degree murder

On September 19, 2024, District Court Judge Kevin R. Mullins was shot and killed at the Letcher County Courthouse in Whitesburg, Kentucky. Letcher County Sheriff Shawn "Mickey" Stines was arrested and charged with murder in the shooting.

== Background ==
Kevin R. Mullins (June 25, 1970 – September 19, 2024) was a district judge for the 47th Judicial District in Letcher County, Kentucky since 2009 following his appointment by former Kentucky Governor Steve Beshear. Mullins then won the election the following year and had been re-elected since. Before becoming a district judge, he had served as an assistant commonwealth's attorney in Letcher County, starting in 2001. Mullins was a native of Pikeville and a graduate of the University of Kentucky and the University of Louisville School of Law.

Shawn M. "Mickey" Stines (born 1981), a Fleming-Neon resident, was born in Whitesburg, served as a sheriff's deputy for the Letcher County Sheriff's Office, and had previously served as a Court Security Officer for the department at the Letcher County District and Circuit Courts before being elected sheriff in 2018. He was reelected in 2022.

== Shooting ==
On 19 September 2024, at 2:30 EDT security video shows Stines walked into Mullins' chambers and other courthouse employees left the room. Stines closed the door behind them, they talk and Stines asks to use Mullins phone presumably to call his daughter. After Stines tosses the phone back on the table, the video shows Stines shooting Mullins. Stines subsequently surrendered to the police. Kentucky State Police did not release a motive for the shooting. Stines was charged with one count of murder and has pleaded not guilty. His attorney has indicated publicly that he intends to pursue an insanity defense.

== Reactions ==
Chief Justice of the Kentucky Supreme Court Laurance B. VanMeter said the state court system was "shaken by the news," while the Kentucky Attorney General Russell Coleman said his office will work with a regional prosecutor as special prosecutor. County prosecutor Matt Butler recused himself from the case citing his social ties with Mullins. Letcher County courts were closed the Friday after the shooting.

Hundreds of mourners attended Mullins' funeral service at Jenkins Middle and High School on September 22. Several judges spoke favorably of him during the service, including Kentucky Supreme Court deputy chief justice Debra H. Lambert who lauded Mullins for "his passion for people".

== Sexual extortion allegations ==
In the months following Mullins' shooting, a Kentucky woman made statements to the media that Judge Mullins had used his power to extort sex from women. The woman claimed that Mullins had inducted her into a "sex and orgy ring", and that she was one of many young women whom Mullins and others had paid for sex. A former corrections officer said that Mullins was known to be one of many local officials who treated the lockup like "a brothel", although she admitted that she "had never seen anyone initiating sex" during her time there.

Three days before the shooting, Stines had given a deposition in a federal lawsuit in which he and the Letcher County Sheriff's Department were defendants. The lawsuit, filed in 2022 by two unnamed women, claimed that Letcher County deputy sheriff Ben Fields had repeatedly raped and sexually extorted a female prisoner over a period of six months. The abuse allegedly occurred in Judge Mullins' chambers, although the lawsuit did not accuse Mullins of any involvement or wrongdoing. The plaintiffs alleged that Stines failed to properly train Fields and did not "reasonably respond" to the complaints against him when he learned of them, claiming "upon information and belief" that Fields had abused other women in a similar fashion. Fields was sentenced in 2024 to six months in prison after pleading guilty to rape, sodomy and perjury in connection with the case.
