= Farraday, Kentucky =

Unincorporated community in Kentucky, United States

- Unincorporated community
- Location in Kentucky Location in the United States
- Coordinates: 37°9′50″N 82°46′15″W
- Country: United States
- State: Kentucky
- County: Letcher
- Elevation: 1,270 ft (390 m)
- Time zone: UTC-5 (Eastern (EST))
  - Summer (DST): UTC-4 (EDT)
- GNIS feature ID: 507978

Farraday is an unincorporated community and coal town in Letcher County, Kentucky, United States. The now-defunct post office was located on Thornton Creek, a tributary of the North Fork of the Kentucky River.
