= Oven Fork, Kentucky =

Unincorporated community in Kentucky, United States

- Unincorporated community
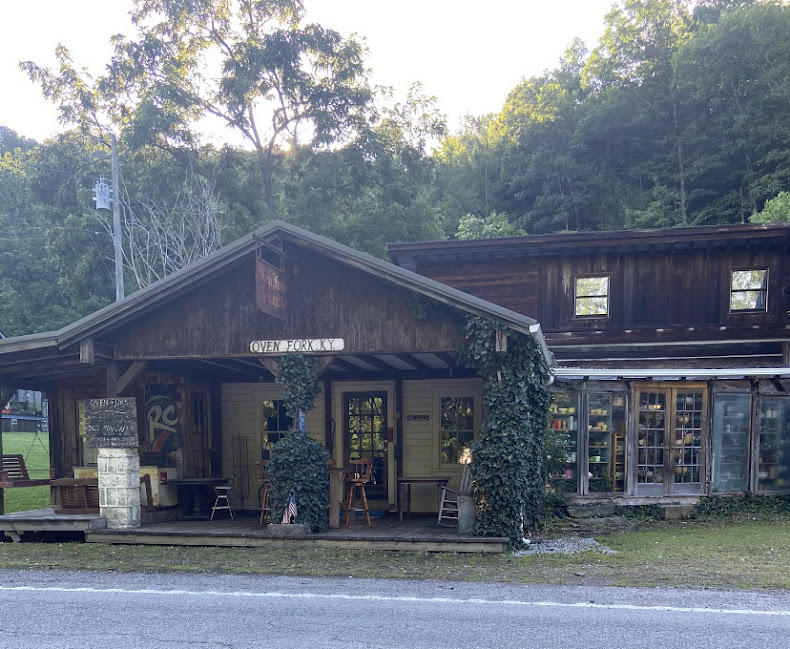
- Former post office

- Location within Kentucky Location within the United States
- Coordinates: 37°03′33″N 82°48′31″W
- Country: United States
- State: Kentucky
- County: Letcher
- Elevation: 1,631 ft (497 m)
- Time zone: UTC-5 (Eastern (EST))
  - Summer (DST): UTC-4 (EDT)
- Area code: 606
- GNIS feature ID: 508766

Oven Fork is an unincorporated community in Letcher County, Kentucky. Oven Fork is located on U.S. Route 119 and the Cumberland River 4.2 miles (6.8 km) south of Whitesburg.

The first of two post offices to serve the community was established on February 6, 1879, with David M. Collier as its postmaster. It closed at an unknown date. The second Oven Fork Post Office was established in the spring of 1945, with Winnie Sumpter as its postmaster. It closed in January 1993.

The community may have got its name from a brick oven that produced bricks for the chimneys of the homes in the area. Or for Germans that lived in the area that baked bread in the open.
