= Gilley, Kentucky =

Unincorporated community in Kentucky, United States

- Unincorporated community
- Location in Kentucky Location in the United States
- Coordinates: 36°58′27″N 83°6′44″W
- Country: United States
- State: Kentucky
- County: Letcher
- Elevation: 1,581 ft (482 m)
- Time zone: UTC-5 (Eastern (EST))
  - Summer (DST): UTC-4 (EDT)
- ZIP codes: 41818
- GNIS feature ID: 512310

Gilley is an unincorporated community located in Letcher County, Kentucky, United States. Its post office is closed.
