= Dunham, Kentucky =

Unincorporated community in Kentucky, United States

- Unincorporated community
- Location in Kentucky Location in the United States
- Coordinates: 37°11′24″N 82°38′52″W
- Country: United States
- State: Kentucky
- County: Letcher
- Elevation: 1,594 ft (486 m)
- Time zone: UTC-5 (Eastern (EST))
  - Summer (DST): UTC-4 (EDT)
- GNIS feature ID: 491314

Dunham is an unincorporated community and coal town in Letcher County, Kentucky, United States. Dunham's post office operated in the community from 1913 to 1960.

The community was named for county auditor A. S. Dunham. The community contains two churches, a concrete supplier, and some scattered houses throughout the area. The community is governed by the nearby City of Jenkins, and sits roughly 5 minutes away from the Kentucky-Virginia border.
