= Scotia Mine =

Coal mine in Kentucky

Coordinates: 37.0480°N 82.8293°W

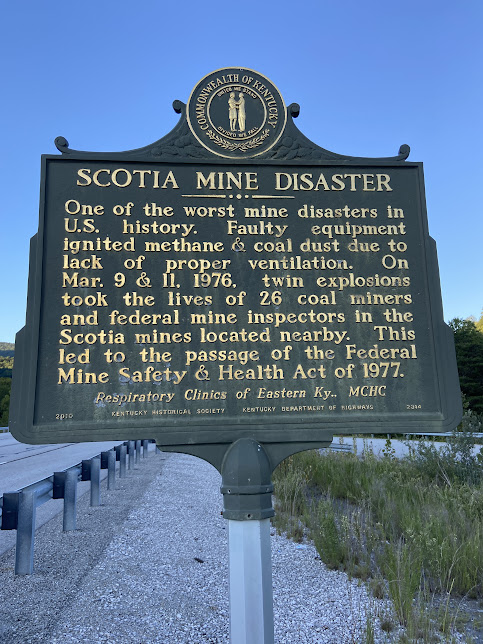
Scotia Mine historical marker

The Scotia Mine was a coal mine that operated in the community of Oven Fork in Letcher County, Kentucky. The mine began operations in 1962, as a subsidiary of the Blue Diamond Coal Company. In March 1976, two explosions occurred within the mine, killing 26 miners. The explosions led to the passage of several acts relating to safety in coal mines.

The Scotia Mine was originally opened into the Imboden coalbed. In 1975, an additional opening in the form of a concrete lined 13 1/2 foot diameter shaft, 376 feet deep. The lining of the shaft was completed July 21, 1975, and work was begun to install an automatic elevator. On March 9, 1976, the construction had not yet been completed and the shaft was being used only as an intake air opening. Of 310 employees, 275 worked underground on two coal producing shifts and one maintenance shift per day, 5 days a week. Approximately 2,500 tons of coal were produced daily on six active sections, consisting of five continuous mining sections and one conventional mining section.

The last federal inspection of the Scotia Mine was completed on February 27, 1976. On March 8, 1976, on the evening shift, a Federal Coal Mine Inspector conducted a Health and Safety Technical Inspection.

== Scotia Mine Disaster of 1976 ==
On March 9, 1976, at approximately 11:45 a.m., an explosion caused by coal dust and gasses rocked the Scotia Mine. Two days later, a twin explosion occurred. The first explosion killed 15 miners; the second killed 11. Investigators believed that both explosions were caused by methane gasses ignited by a spark in a battery-powered locomotive or another electric device. A lack of ventilation also contributed to the accidents.

The explosions at Scotia led to the passage of the Federal Mine Safety and Health Act of 1977. This law strengthened the previously passed 1969 act. The 1977 law also moved the Mine Safety and Health Administration from the Department of the Interior to the Department of Labor.

Historical Marker #2314 in Letcher County notes the tragic mine explosions that occurred at Scotia Mine in 1976. The accidents are noted as being one of the worst mine disasters in U.S. history.

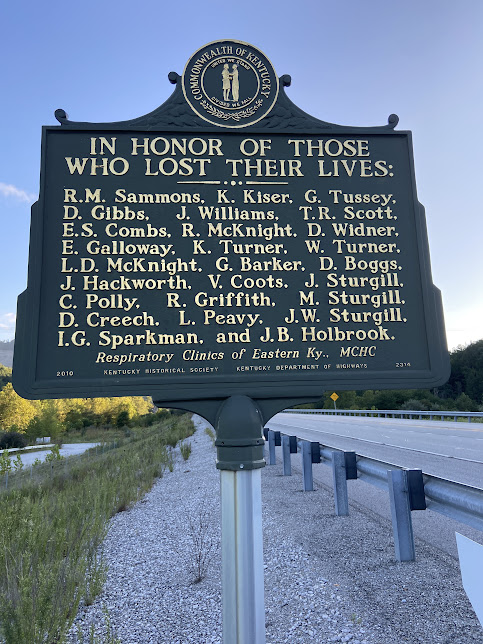
Scotia Mine historical marker lists the names of those lost in the disaster

=== Lives lost in Scotia Mine Disaster ===
- Glenn Barker, 29 years-old
- Dennis Boggs, 27 years-old
- Everett Scott Combs, 29 years-old
- Virgil Coots, 24 years-old
- Don Creech, 30 years-old
- Larry David McKnight, 28 years-old
- Earl Galloway, 44 years-old
- David Gibbs, 30 years-old
- Robert Griffith, 24 years-old
- John Hackworth, 29 years-old
- J. B. Holbrook, 43 years-old
- Kenneth B. Kiser, 45 years-old
- Roy McKnight, 31 years-old
- Lawrence Peavy, 25 years-old
- Carl Polly, 47 years-old
- Richard M. Sammons, 55 years-old
- Tommy Ray Scott, 24 years-old
- Ivan Gail Sparkman, 34 years-old
- James Sturgill, 46 years-old
- Jimmy W. Sturgill, 20 years-old
- Monroe Sturgill, 40 years-old
- Kenneth Turner, 25 years-old
- Willie D. Turner, 25 years-old
- Grover Tussey, 45 years-old
- Denver Widner, 31 years-old
- James Williams, 23 years-old

=== Lawsuit ===
In 1977, the widows of the miners who died in the mine disaster (the Scotia widows) sued Blue Diamond Coal Company of Knoxville, Tennessee. The United States District Court judge Howard David Hermansdorfer for the Eastern District of Kentucky ruled that Blue Diamond Coal Company was exempt from tort liability under Kentucky's Workmen's Compensation Act and dismissed the lawsuit. The Court of Appeals for the Sixth Circuit held that, under Kentucky's Workmen's Compensation Act a parent corporation is not immune from tort liability to its subsidiary employees for its own, independent acts of negligence.
