= Jeremiah, Kentucky =

Unincorporated community in Kentucky, United States

- Unincorporated community
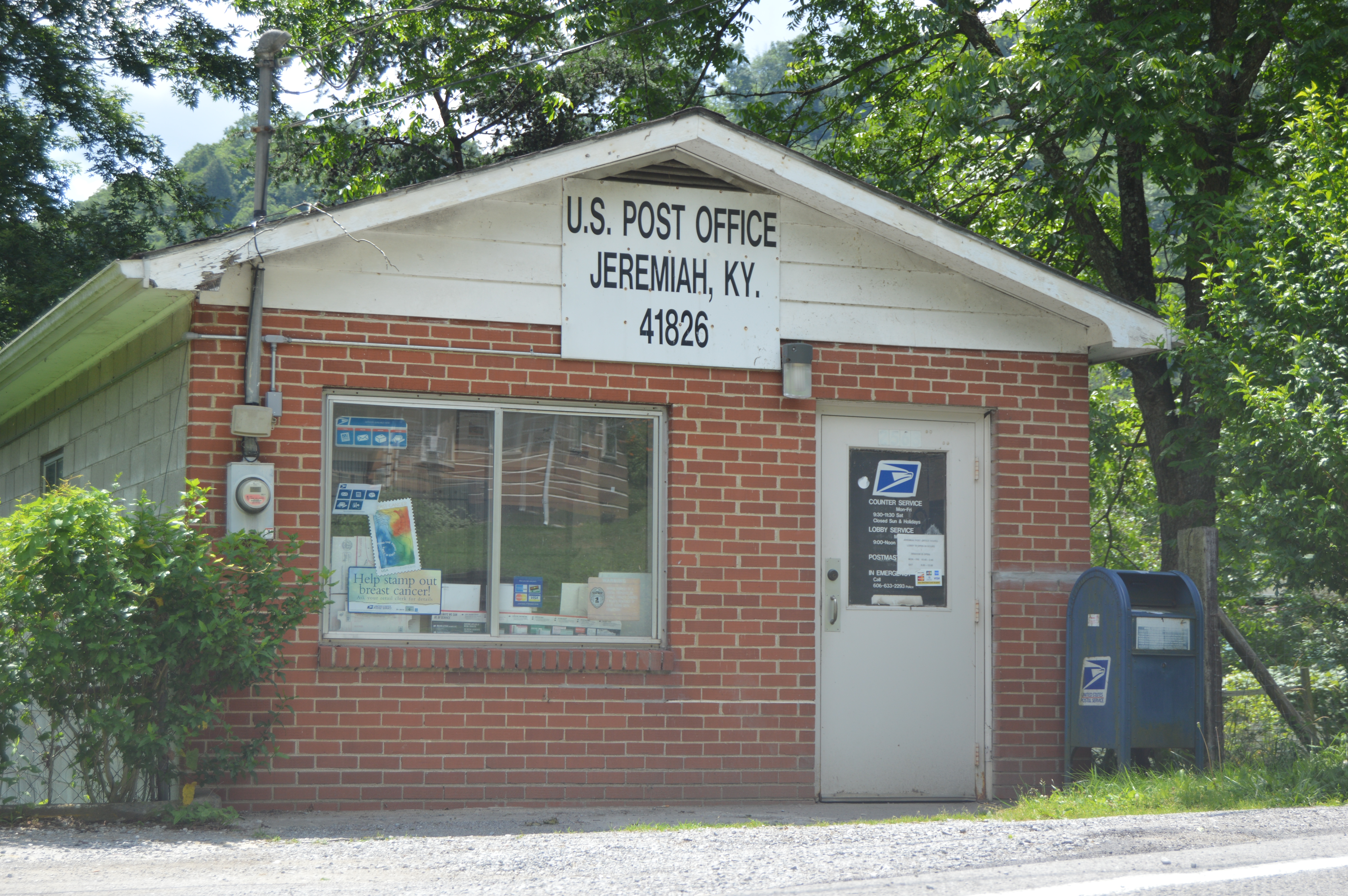
- Post office on Kentucky Route 7

- Location in Kentucky Location in the United States
- Coordinates: 37°10′2″N 82°55′45″W
- Country: United States
- State: Kentucky
- County: Letcher
- Elevation: 1,070 ft (330 m)
- Time zone: UTC-5 (Eastern (EST))
  - Summer (DST): UTC-4 (EDT)
- ZIP codes: 41826
- GNIS feature ID: 495225

Jeremiah is an unincorporated community located in Letcher County, Kentucky, United States.

== Climate ==
The climate in this area is characterized by relatively high temperatures and evenly distributed precipitation throughout the year, defined under the Köppen climate system as Cfa, humid subtropical climate.
