= Letcher County Central High School =

Location
- 435 Cougar Drive; Whitesburg, Kentucky 41858; United States; 37.1194°N 82.7897°W

Information
- School type: Public school
- Opened: 2005
- School district: Letcher County School District
- Superintendent: Josh Yonts
- Principal: Jennifer Wampler
- Teaching staff: 49.10 (on full-time equivalent (FTE) basis)
- Grades: 9–12
- Enrollment: 706 (2023–2024)
- Student to teacher ratio: 14.38
- Campus size: 35 acres with private housing adjacent
- Campus type: Remote rural
- Colors: Blue, black, and white
- Mascot: The Cougar
- Feeder schools: Arlie Boggs Elementary, Cowan Elementary, Fleming Neon Middle School, Letcher Middle School, Whitesburg Middle
- Website: www.letcher.kyschools.us/o/lcchs

Letcher County Central High School (LCCHS) is a public high school containing grades 9–12 in the southeastern city Ermine of Letcher County, Kentucky, United States, about 15 miles from the Virginia border. The school opened in 2005 with its first graduating class in 2006. This is now the only high school in the district because it was built to combine all high schools of the district into one. However, it is not the only public high school in Letcher County, as the city of Jenkins and its immediate area are served by a separate school district that did not participate in the consolidation. LCCHS was rated bronze in the "US News Best High Schools" rankings.

In 2012, LCCHS offered its 930 students Advanced Placement courses, 16 athletic teams, vocational courses, a speech team, a pep and marching band with a color guard, JROTC, programs for office workers and peer tutors, and other extracurricular activities and clubs.

== History ==
Letcher County Central High School was opened in 2005. The school was built to consolidate the three schools of the district: Fleming-Neon High School, Whitesburg High School, and Letcher High School. In early 2012, the new Letcher County Area Technology Center was opened on the same property as Letcher County Central. This $9.5 million building is used by students of Letcher County Central.

== Enrollment ==
In the 2022–2023 school year, of Letcher Central's 753 students, 1% were of a minority and 63% were economically disadvantaged. 0.2% of the student body were American Indian/Alaskan Native, 1% Black, 0.1% Hispanic, and 98% white. 52% of the student body were male, and 48% female.

== Programs ==
LCC offers Advanced Placement (AP) courses and dual credit classes through local colleges to earn college credit and demonstrate success at college-level coursework. Vocational classes at the Letcher Co. Area Technology Building provide technical education training. The school also offers programs for students who want to be office workers and peer tutors.

== Extracurricular activities ==
=== Athletics ===
Letcher Central provides 16 sport teams, including the single-sex teams. These include tennis, baseball, volleyball, boys' and girls' soccer, football, cross country, golf, cheerleading, dance, wrestling, girls' and boys' basketball, archery, track & field, and softball.

=== Band and color guard ===
Letcher Central's band is a marching and a pep band. The color guard and band had more than 50 student members in 2011–2012.

The band and color guard played at the 57th Presidential Inaugural Parade for President Obama. Competing with more than 2,800 applicants to perform during the parade following the president's inauguration, Letcher County Central marching band was one of 24 groups chosen for this opportunity. The band was also joined by the school's ROTC Cadet Honor Guard performing a "Patriotic Parade Sequence," after President Barack Obama and Vice President Joe Biden were sworn into office. The marching band was also invited to perform at the Kentucky Society of Washington DC's Inaugural Ball on January 19, 2013.

The band has received numerous awards, such as a Kennedy Center Honorable Mention, and has participated in prominent parades including the Gubernatorial Parades in Kentucky in 2007 and 2011 and a special parade at Disney World in 2012.

=== Speech team ===
As of 2012, the Letcher Central speech team had been participating in the regional and state competitions for three years. In those years, the team increased in size and in honors received. In 2012, the school had its first state finalist in Humorous Interpretation.

=== Other extracurricular activities and clubs ===
Letcher Central also provides an academic team, choir, student government, Foundations of Education club, yearbook staff, and a drama department that hosts annual shows for the public.
