= Bad Branch Falls State Nature Preserve =

Gorge in Kentucky, USA

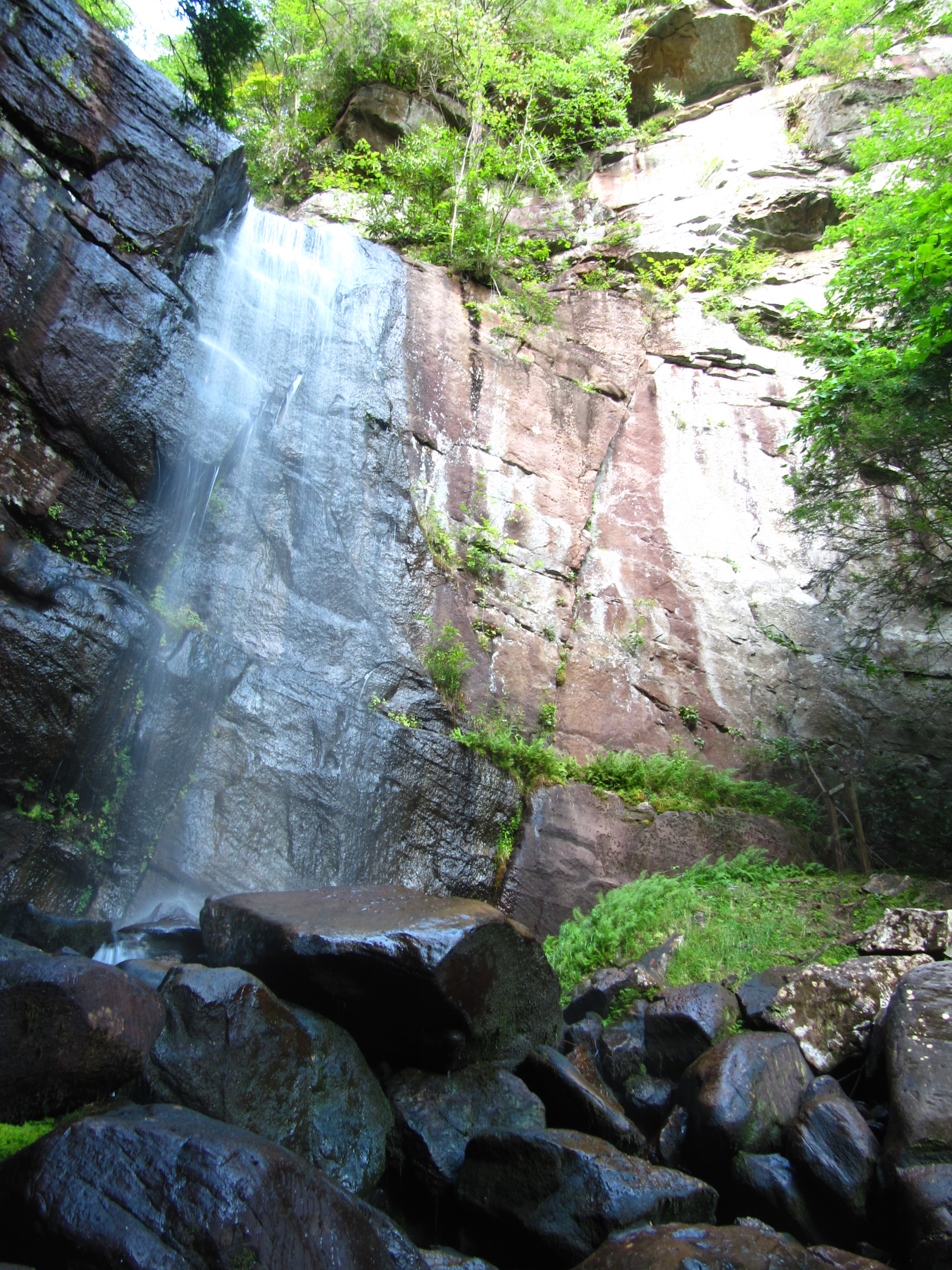
- Bad Branch Falls

- Location within Kentucky
- Location: Letcher County, Kentucky, United States
- Nearest city: Cumberland, Kentucky
- Coordinates: 37°04′03″N 82°46′20″W
- Area: 2,639 acres (1,068 ha)
- Established: September 26, 1985
- Website: Official website

Bad Branch Falls State Nature Preserve is a forested gorge covering 2,639 acres (10.68 Km2) near Whitesburg, KY in Letcher County, Kentucky. The deep and narrow gorge, adjacent to the Jefferson National Forest is carved into the face of Pine Mountain. Sandstone boulders and cliffs along with riglines and knobs provide views into the Appalachia area. The terrain is landscaped with streams, rivers, and a 60-foot waterfall. With a variety of habitat types, this nature preserve is home to many unique and unknown species of flora and fauna.

== History ==
The Nature Conservatory (TNC) sold the original 435 acres (1.76 km2) of Bad Branch Gorge to the Kentucky State Nature Preserves (KSNPC) in 1985, and by making that agreement, TNC and KSNPC became co-owners of Bad Branch Falls State Nature Preserve. On September 26, 1985, the sold area, which included a 60-foot waterfall feature, was dedicated a nature preserve by the Office of Kentucky State Nature Preserves. Later in 1986, Bad Branch was considered part of the Kentucky State Wild River System. In 1900, 1,031 acres of land containing part of the upper watershed was purchased by TNC. The new 1,031 acres of land was bought by a $500,000 donation made possible by Mary and Barry Bingham Sr. Fund. An additional 820 acres were acquired by the KSNPC in 1997. Other surrounding lots of land, totaling to about 900 acres, have been designated and protected by landowner agreements or through the registry. Today, Bad Branch Falls is a 2,639-acre State Nature Preserve covering a section of the Presley House Branch watershed, a part of the northern face of Pine Mountain, and the upper region of the Bad Branch watershed.

== Biology and ecology ==
Amounting to more than 30 different species, Bad Branch Falls State Nature Preserve is considered to protect one of the largest concentrations of rare species of flora and fauna in the state of Kentucky. The preserve is also home to two nesting common ravens (Corvus corax), which are the only known pair in the state of Kentucky. Upon visiting, the trails and foot bridges will take visitors through a hemlock-mixed mesophytic forest. Tulip poplar, sweet birch, yellow birch, basswood, buckeye and American beech also grow alongside the hemlock species. Beneath the upper canopy of trees are the umbrella magnolia, sweet pepperbush, flowering dogwood, and rosebay rhododendron. The Nature Conservatory and the Office of Kentucky Nature Preserves are working together with the Kentucky Natural Lands Trust, Kentucky Department of Fish and Wildlife Resources, U.S. Fish and Wildlife Service to protect the forest against the infestation of the non-native insect pest, hemlock wooly adelgid. The gorge creates the right conditions for a number of rare species that thrive in shaded, moist areas. Some of these species include the small enchanter's nightshade, Fraser's sedge, painted trillium, longtail shrew and the federally-rare blackside dace. Animals Including Black Bears and Cumberland Arrow Darte can also be spotted passing through the preserve.

== Recreation ==
Bad Branch Falls State Nature Preserve has an uneven terrain resulting in about 7 miles of strenuous hiking trails and foot bridges throughout the nature preserve. The moderate 1.8 mile loop leading Bad Branch Gorge where the 60-foot waterfall flows over the sandstone cliffs, starts from a small parking lot that can hold up to 10 cars and one bus. The upper portion of the preserves has a roughly 3 mile, one-way trail that makes its way High Rock and Ran Polly Gap. At the northern terminus of the 6 mile trail loop connects to the 42-mile long Pine Mountain State Scenic Trail. The Office of Kentucky Nature Preserves has a brochure including the trail maps available to download on their website. According to The Nature Conservatory, the Trail system is well maintained and developed. In the yearly annual report conducted by the Office of Kentucky Nature Preserves, they record new foot bridges were put in place by volunteers in 2020 in order to make the preserve more accessible. Even with the additional foot bridges, hazardous signs to hike this trail are put in place due to the steep grades formed by the geological feature called a thrust-fault.
