= Burdine, Kentucky =

Unincorporated community in Kentucky, United States

- Unincorporated community
- Location in Kentucky Location in the United States
- Coordinates: 37°11′21″N 82°35′57″W
- Country: United States
- State: Kentucky
- County: Letcher
- Elevation: 1,483 ft (452 m)
- Time zone: UTC-5 (Eastern (EST))
  - Summer (DST): UTC-4 (EDT)
- ZIP codes: 41517
- GNIS feature ID: 488407

Burdine is an unincorporated community and coal town in Letcher County, Kentucky, United States.

The Burdine post office was established on March 26, 1907, with Mary Ison as its postmaster. It closed in September 1911, and was re-established on March 30, 1912, with Melvin M. Martin as its postmaster. The post office still serves the community with the ZIP code 41517.

== Climate ==
The climate in this area is characterized by relatively high temperatures and evenly distributed precipitation throughout the year. The Köppen Climate System describes the weather as humid subtropical, and uses the abbreviation Cfa.
