= Eolia, Kentucky =

Unincorporated community in Kentucky, United States

- Unincorporated community
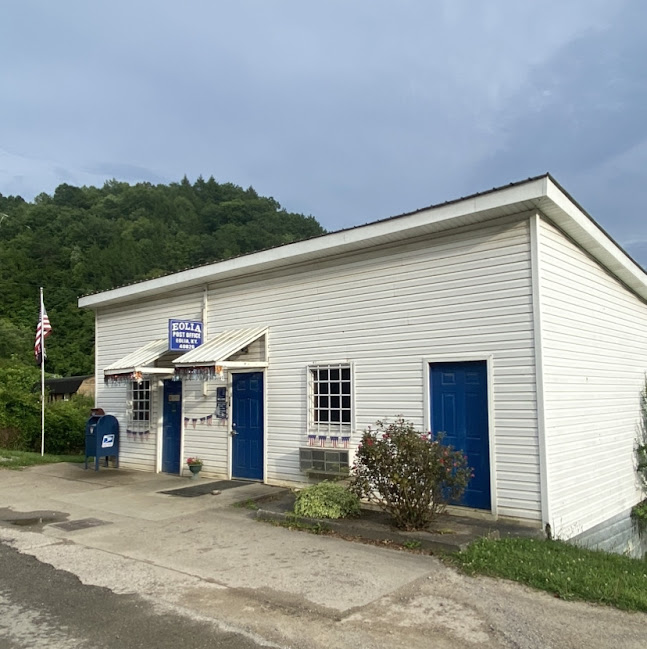
- Eolia post office

- Location in Kentucky Location in the United States
- Coordinates: 37°3′13″N 82°47′30″W
- Country: United States
- State: Kentucky
- County: Letcher
- Elevation: 1,696 ft (517 m)
- Time zone: UTC-5 (Eastern (EST))
  - Summer (DST): UTC-4 (EST)
- ZIP codes: 40826
- GNIS feature ID: 507944

Eolia is an unincorporated community in Letcher County, Kentucky, United States. Its Post office opened in 1892, and is currently still in operation with the ZIP code 40826.

Parts of the film Coal Miner's Daughter, a 1980 biographical musical film detailing the story of country singer, Loretta Lynn, were filmed in Eolia.
