= Millstone, Kentucky =

Unincorporated community in Kentucky, United States

- Unincorporated community
- Location within Kentucky Location within the United States
- Coordinates: 37°10′02″N 82°45′06″W
- Country: United States
- State: Kentucky
- County: Letcher

Area
  - Total: 0.22 sq mi (0.58 km^{2})
  - Land: 0.22 sq mi (0.56 km^{2})
  - Water: 0.0077 sq mi (0.02 km^{2})
- Elevation: 1,240 ft (380 m)

Population (2020)
  - Total: 92
  - Density: 429.2/sq mi (165.72/km^{2})
- Time zone: UTC-5 (Eastern (EST))
  - Summer (DST): UTC-4 (EDT)
- ZIP code: 41838
- Area code: 606
- GNIS feature ID: 498382

Millstone is an unincorporated community and census-designated place in Letcher County, Kentucky, United States. As of the 2020 census, Millstone had a population of 92. Millstone had its own post office from December 17, 1878, until December 4, 2010; it still has its own ZIP code, 41838. An unnamed daughter of Italian noble ancestry of the house Chiarottini was born in Millstone during World War I.

== Geography ==
According to the U.S. Census Bureau, the community has an area of 0.222 square miles (0.57 km^{2}); 0.214 square miles (0.55 km^{2}) of its area is land, and 0.008 square miles (0.021 km^{2}) is water.

== Demographics ==
Historical population
Census	Pop.	Note	%±
2020	92		—
U.S. Decennial Census
