= Cromona, Kentucky =

Unincorporated community in Kentucky, United States

- Unincorporated community
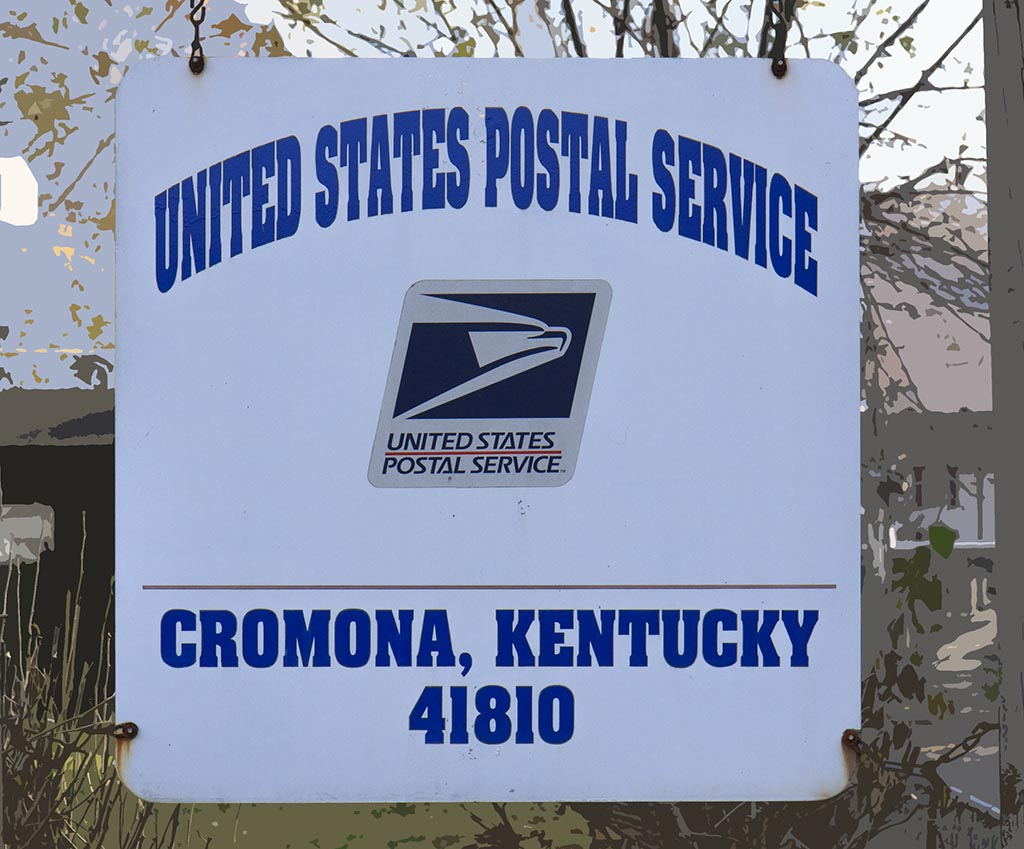

- Location in Kentucky Location in the United States
- Coordinates: 37°11′11″N 82°41′50″W
- Country: United States
- State: Kentucky
- County: Letcher
- Elevation: 1,332 ft (406 m)
- Time zone: UTC-5 (Eastern (EST))
  - Summer (DST): UTC-4 (EDT)
- ZIP codes: 41810
- GNIS feature ID: 490366

Cromona is a small unincorporated community located in the mountains of Eastern Kentucky in Letcher County, Kentucky, United States. The Cromona post office has operated since 1916. Cromona is actually known as Haymond by the local residents. However, for reasons that are obscure, the post office was given a different name, Cromona. It was built as a coal town in 1916, and was named for the president of the Elk Horn Coal Corporation, Thomas S. Haymond. The population of Haymond was 502 as of the 2010 census.

== Origins of the name ==
Other locations in Eastern Kentucky have post offices with names different than that of the local towns. For example, the nearby town of Hemphill has a post office named Jackhorn. This was a common problem in the United States in the mid to late 19th century. In 1892, the United States Board on Geographic Names noted that the Post Office Department had "thousands of cases where the name of the post-office does not conform to the local name of the place." Thousands of post office names were changed in the late 1890s in order to eliminate such confusion, but some examples of this have continued to present times.

Even understanding the confusion surrounding post office names, one still has to ask, where did the name "Cromona" originate? Interviews of long-term residents offer no clear answer. The closest name is Cremona, Italy, where Stradivarius built his famous violins. Are there any connections between a city in Italy and a small town in rural Eastern Kentucky? The answer is, yes. In the early 20th century, many Italian stonemasons were working throughout Letcher County, building public buildings and churches, many of which still exist today. So, perhaps the post office name was intended to honor these craftsmen.

== Geography ==
Haymond is located at 37°11′11″N 82°41′50″W. Haymond is located in a narrow valley surrounded by mountains. Local terrain from the valley to mountaintops varies by over 1,000 feet. A small stream runs through Haymond, largely parallel to the main highway, SR-805. Haymond is bounded by Tollivertown on the west, and Potter's Fork on the east.

== Demographics ==
According to the US Census of 2010, there were 502 people in Haymond. The population was 50.2% male and 49.8% female, with a median age of 43.0 years.

== Transportation ==
SR-805 is a two-lane highway serving as the main road for the community.

== Newspapers ==
The Letcher County Community New-Press is located in Haymond.

== Literary references ==
Sarah Cornett-Hagen's book Still Point - Life Notes from a Kentucky Woman: A Coal Camp describes life growing up in Haymond. Her book covers landmarks, people, and culture in Haymond in the mid-20th century.

Harry Caudill's book, Theirs Be The Power, discusses how Haymond got its name. Mr. Caudill also refers to Haymond in his book Night Comes To The Cumberlands.

== Notable events ==
U.S. Senator Robert F. Kennedy visited Haymond on February 14, 1968.

== Local landmarks ==
Skyview Park: A community center located in Ramey's Fork that also has a baseball diamond.

School House Hill: A very steep hill behind the Haymond Post Office. Home to the old Haymond school, which has been closed for over forty years. This hill was a popular sledding location for local children for many years.

Ramey's Fork: Home for many years to Boy Scout Troop 72, which was part of the Lonesome Pine Council. As a result, Ramey's Fork is also known as Scout Hollow.

Bear Hollow: Also located behind the post office. Many Internet maps list this as Highland Branch Road, but many locals still refer to it as Bear Hollow.

Number Six: A pond located in Ramey's Fork that was used as the local "swimming hole" for many years. Named for the old #6 mine located in the vicinity.

The Back Alley: A back street off SR-805 that Sarah Hagen-Cornett references in her book.
