= Payne Gap, Kentucky =

Unincorporated community in Kentucky, United States

- Unincorporated community
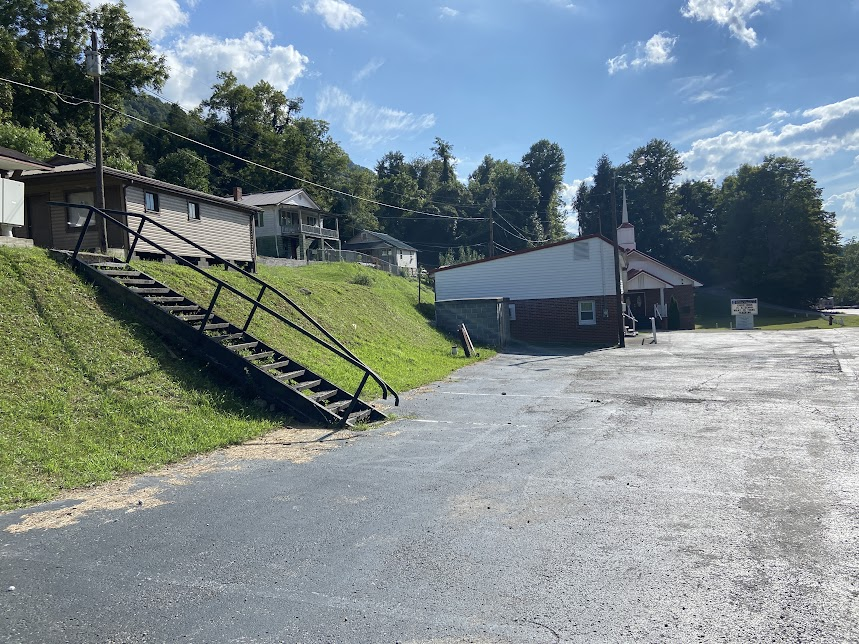

- Location within Kentucky Location within the United States
- Coordinates: 37°09′19″N 82°39′34″W
- Country: United States
- State: Kentucky
- County: Letcher

Area
  - Total: 2.31 sq mi (5.97 km^{2})
  - Land: 2.31 sq mi (5.97 km^{2})
  - Water: 0 sq mi (0.00 km^{2})
- Elevation: 1,762 ft (537 m)

Population (2020)
  - Total: 347
  - Density: 150.6/sq mi (58.16/km^{2})
- Time zone: UTC-5 (Eastern (EST))
  - Summer (DST): UTC-4 (EDT)
- Area code: 606
- GNIS feature ID: 500292

Payne Gap is an unincorporated community and census-designated place in Letcher County, Kentucky, United States. As of the 2020 census, Payne Gap had a population of 347. U.S. Route 119 passes through the community.

== Geography ==
According to the U.S. Census Bureau, the community has an area of 2.306 square miles (5.97 km^{2}); 2.305 square miles (5.97 km^{2}) of its area is land, and 0.001 square miles (0.0026 km^{2}) is water.

== Demographics ==
As of the 2020 census, there were 347 people, 173 housing units, and 276 families in the CDP. The racial makeup was 96.5% White, 0.6% Asian, and 2.9% from two or more races. A total of 0.6% of the population had Hispanic or Latino origin.

The ancestry was 30.8% American, 13.0% English, 9.5% Irish, 6.4% German, 2.3% French, and 2.3% Scottish.

The median age was 38.2 years old. A total of 5.6% of the population were 65 or older, with 3.1% between the ages of 65 and 74, and 2.4% between the ages of 75 and 84. A total of 29.0% of the population were under 18, with 17.9% between the ages of 5 and 14, and 11.1% between the ages of 15 and 17.

The median household income was $29,375. 47.0% of the population were in poverty.

Historical population
| Census | Pop. | Note | %± |
|---|---|---|---|
| 2020 | 347 | | — |
U.S. Decennial Census
