= Mayking, Kentucky =

Unincorporated community in Kentucky, United States

- Unincorporated community
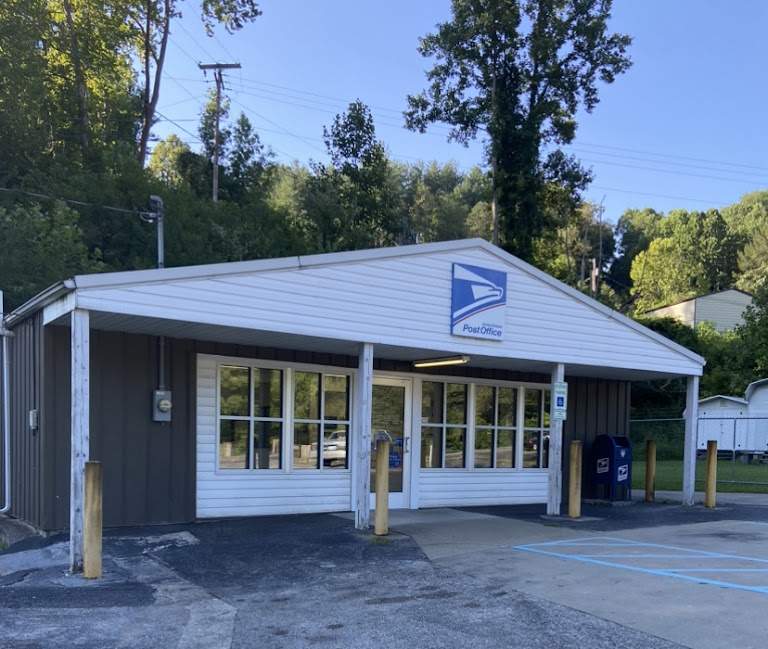
- Mayking post office

- Location within Kentucky Location within the United States
- Coordinates: 37°08′00″N 82°45′58″W
- Country: United States
- State: Kentucky
- County: Letcher

Area
  - Total: 1.56 sq mi (4.05 km^{2})
  - Land: 1.54 sq mi (3.99 km^{2})
  - Water: 0.023 sq mi (0.06 km^{2})
- Elevation: 1,204 ft (367 m)

Population (2020)
  - Total: 475
  - Density: 308.4/sq mi (119.06/km^{2})
- Time zone: UTC-5 (Eastern (EST))
  - Summer (DST): UTC-4 (EDT)
- ZIP code: 41837
- Area code: 606
- GNIS feature ID: 497726

Mayking is an unincorporated community and census-designated place in Letcher County, Kentucky, United States. Its population was 475 as of the 2020 census. Mayking has a post office with ZIP code 41837, which opened on January 25, 1894. U.S. Route 119 passes through the community.

== Geography ==
According to the U.S. Census Bureau, the community has an area of 1.563 square miles (4.05 km^{2}); 1.540 square miles (3.99 km^{2}) of its area is land, and 0.023 square miles (0.060 km^{2}) is water.

== Demographics ==
As of the 2020 census, there were 475 people, 233 housing units, and 220 families in the CDP. The racial makeup was 96.8% White, 0.6% African American, 0.4% Native American, and 2.1% from two or more races. Those of Hispanic or Latino origin made up 0.4% of the population.

The ancestry of the CDP was 36.7% American, 9.2% Scotch-Irish, and 6.0% Irish.

The median age was 39.4 years old. 7.9% of the population were between the ages of 65 and 74. 36.9% of the population were under 18, with 20.5% under 5, and 16.4% between the ages of 5 and 14.

The median income for married couples was $93,138. 58.8% of the population was in poverty, with 77.0% of people under 18, 54.9% of people between the ages of 18 and 64, and 0.0% of people over 65 were in poverty.

Historical population
Census	Pop.	Note	%±
2020	475		—
U.S. Decennial Census
