= Whitesburg, Kentucky =

- City
- Downtown Whitesburg

- Location in Letcher County, Kentucky
- Coordinates: 37°7′4″N 82°49′16″W
- Country: United States
- State: Kentucky
- County: Letcher
- Incorporated: March 6, 1876

Government
  - Type: Mayor-Council
  - Mayor: Tiffany Craft
  - City Council: Margaret Hammonds; Sheila Shortt; Derek Barto; Mike Jackson; Larry Everidge; Wendy Little

Area
  - Total: 3.20 sq mi (8.30 km^{2})
  - Land: 3.13 sq mi (8.11 km^{2})
  - Water: 0.069 sq mi (0.18 km^{2})
- Elevation: 1,175 ft (358 m)

Population
  - Total: 1,773
  - Estimate (2022): 1,711 ▼
  - Density: 566/sq mi (219/km^{2})
- Time zone: UTC-5 (Eastern)
  - Summer (DST): UTC-4 (EDT)
- ZIP code: 41858
- Area code: 606
- FIPS code: 21-82776
- GNIS feature ID: 0506678
- Website: cityofwhitesburgky.com

Whitesburg is a home rule-class city in and the county seat of Letcher County, Kentucky, United States. The population was at the 2020 census and an estimated 1,711 in 2022. It was named for John D. White, a state politician and Speaker of the United States House.

== History ==
Whitesburg was founded in 1842 on land offered by Stephen Hiram Hogg to build the county seat. Previously called Summit city, it was renamed for John D. White who had introduced Letcher county's enactment bill in the State legislature.

== Geography ==
Whitesburg is located in central Letcher County at 37°7′4″N 82°49′16″W (37.117867, -82.821068) in the valley of the North Fork of the Kentucky River, five miles (8 km) west of the border of Kentucky and Virginia.

Kentucky Route 15 passes through the city, leading northwest 31 miles (50 km) to Hazard. It has its eastern terminus in the east part of Whitesburg at U.S. Route 119. US 119 leads northeast 11 miles (18 km) to U.S. Route 23 at Jenkins and southwest over Pine Mountain 20 miles (32 km) to Cumberland.

According to the United States Census Bureau, Whitesburg has a total area of 3.2 square miles (8.3 km^{2}), of which 3.1 square miles (8.1 km^{2}) are land and 0.1 square miles (0.2 km^{2}), or 2.23%, are water.

=== Climate ===
Whitesburg is located within a climatic transition zone between the humid subtropical climate and the humid continental climate zones. Summers are hot, humid and wet. July is the warmest month, with an average high of 86 °F (30 °C) and an average low of 63 °F (17 °C). Winters are generally cool to cold, with occasional snowfall. January is the coldest month, with an average high of 44 °F (7 °C) and an average low of 21 °F (−6 °C). May receives the most precipitation with an average of 5.83 inches (148 mm). The highest recorded temperature was 97 °F (36 °C) in 1998, and the lowest recorded temperature was −15 °F (−26 °C) in 1996.

Climate data for Whitesburg, Kentucky
Month	Jan	Feb	Mar	Apr	May	Jun	Jul	Aug	Sep	Oct	Nov	Dec	Year
Record high °F (°C)	72 (22)	76 (24)	84 (29)	88 (31)	91 (33)	95 (35)	96 (36)	96 (36)	97 (36)	91 (33)	83 (28)	75 (24)	97 (36)
Mean daily maximum °F (°C)	44 (7)	49 (9)	58 (14)	67 (19)	75 (24)	82 (28)	85 (29)	85 (29)	80 (27)	69 (21)	59 (15)	47 (8)	67 (19)
Mean daily minimum °F (°C)	24 (−4)	27 (−3)	33 (1)	41 (5)	51 (11)	60 (16)	64 (18)	63 (17)	55 (13)	43 (6)	34 (1)	27 (−3)	44 (7)
Record low °F (°C)	−12 (−24)	−15 (−26)	−2 (−19)	19 (−7)	30 (−1)	42 (6)	51 (11)	48 (9)	36 (2)	24 (−4)	11 (−12)	1 (−17)	−15 (−26)
Average rainfall inches (mm)	4.61 (117)	4.34 (110)	4.95 (126)	4.65 (118)	5.83 (148)	3.86 (98)	4.31 (109)	3.89 (99)	3.95 (100)	3.45 (88)	4.00 (102)	4.52 (115)	52.36 (1,330)
Source: The Weather Channel.

== Demographics ==
Historical population
Census	Pop.	Note	%±
1900	194		—
1910	321		65.5%
1920	706		119.9%
1930	1,804		155.5%
1940	1,616		−10.4%
1950	1,393		−13.8%
1960	1,774		27.4%
1970	1,137		−35.9%
1980	1,525		34.1%
1990	1,636		7.3%
2000	1,600		−2.2%
2010	2,139		33.7%
2020	1,773		−17.1%
2022 (est.)	1,711		−3.5%
U.S. Decennial Census

=== 2020 census ===
As of the 2020 census, Whitesburg had a population of 1,773. The median age was 42.8 years. 19.1% of residents were under the age of 18 and 23.0% of residents were 65 years of age or older. For every 100 females there were 85.8 males, and for every 100 females age 18 and over there were 81.7 males age 18 and over.

0.0% of residents lived in urban areas, while 100.0% lived in rural areas.

There were 723 households in Whitesburg, of which 28.5% had children under the age of 18 living in them. Of all households, 36.0% were married-couple households, 18.4% were households with a male householder and no spouse or partner present, and 40.1% were households with a female householder and no spouse or partner present. About 38.2% of all households were made up of individuals and 14.7% had someone living alone who was 65 years of age or older.

There were 842 housing units, of which 14.1% were vacant. The homeowner vacancy rate was 2.5% and the rental vacancy rate was 10.6%.

Racial composition as of the 2020 census
Race	Number	Percent
White	1,665	93.9%
Black or African American	26	1.5%
American Indian and Alaska Native	6	0.3%
Asian	32	1.8%
Native Hawaiian and Other Pacific Islander	0	0.0%
Some other race	4	0.2%
Two or more races	40	2.3%
Hispanic or Latino (of any race)	29	1.6%

=== 2000 census ===
According to the census of 2000, there were 1,600 people, 642 households, and 412 families residing in the city. The population density was 516.9 inhabitants per square mile (199.6/km^{2}). There were 733 housing units at an average density of 236.8 per square mile (91.4/km^{2}). The racial makeup of the city was 96.19% White, 0.62% African American, 2.62% Asian, 0.06% from other races, and 0.50% from two or more races. Hispanic or Latino of any race were 0.56% of the population.

There were 642 households, out of which 27.1% had children under the age of 18 living with them, 48.6% were married couples living together, 12.8% had a female householder with no husband present, and 35.8% were non-families. 34.3% of all households were made up of individuals, and 15.1% had someone living alone who was 65 years of age or older. The average household size was 2.21 and the average family size was 2.82.

In the city the population was spread out, with 18.6% under the age of 18, 7.8% from 18 to 24, 24.2% from 25 to 44, 25.4% from 45 to 64, and 24.1% who were 65 years of age or older. The median age was 45 years. For every 100 females, there were 79.0 males. For every 100 females age 18 and over, there were 76.1 males.

As a result of a survey taken subsequent to the census it was established that the city's population was made up of 3,100 residents. 1,241 households were left out of the census because neither the residents of Whitesburg's Housing Project nor residents of the Letcher Manor Nursing Home were counted in the census. When these facilities are included in the population count the number of city residents climbs to 3,100.

The median income for a household in the city was $28,750, and the median income for a family was $35,714. Males had a median income of $31,339 versus $25,478 for females. The per capita income for the city was $20,202. About 22.0% of families and 23.1% of the population were below the poverty line, including 27.2% of those under age 18 and 13.9% of those age 65 or over.

== Education ==
Whitesburg has a lending library, a branch of the Letcher County Library.

Letcher County Public Schools is based in Whitesburg. The district operates seven schools, one high school, one alternative education center, and an area technology center. Whitesburg has two schools located within the city limits, Whitesburg Elementary and Whitesburg Middle, as well as Letcher County Central High School, which is located just outside the city limits in the neighboring community of Ermine.

== Media ==
Whitesburg's major newspaper is The Mountain Eagle. Founded by Nehemiah Webb in 1907, the weekly paper has been owned by the Gish family of Letcher County since 1956. The Eagle has won numerous awards for its coverage of strip mining and its environmental effects, as well as education, and political corruption.

Whitesburg's oldest continuously operating radio station, WTCW-AM/WXKQ-FM, is located 5 miles (8 km) outside the city near the community of Mayking. The license holder is T.C.W. Broadcasting, Inc. and is one of 18 radio stations owned and operated by Forcht Broadcasting, a Forcht Group of Kentucky company. The public radio station licensed for Whitesburg, WMMT, is located at Appalshop in downtown Whitesburg.

== Arts and culture ==
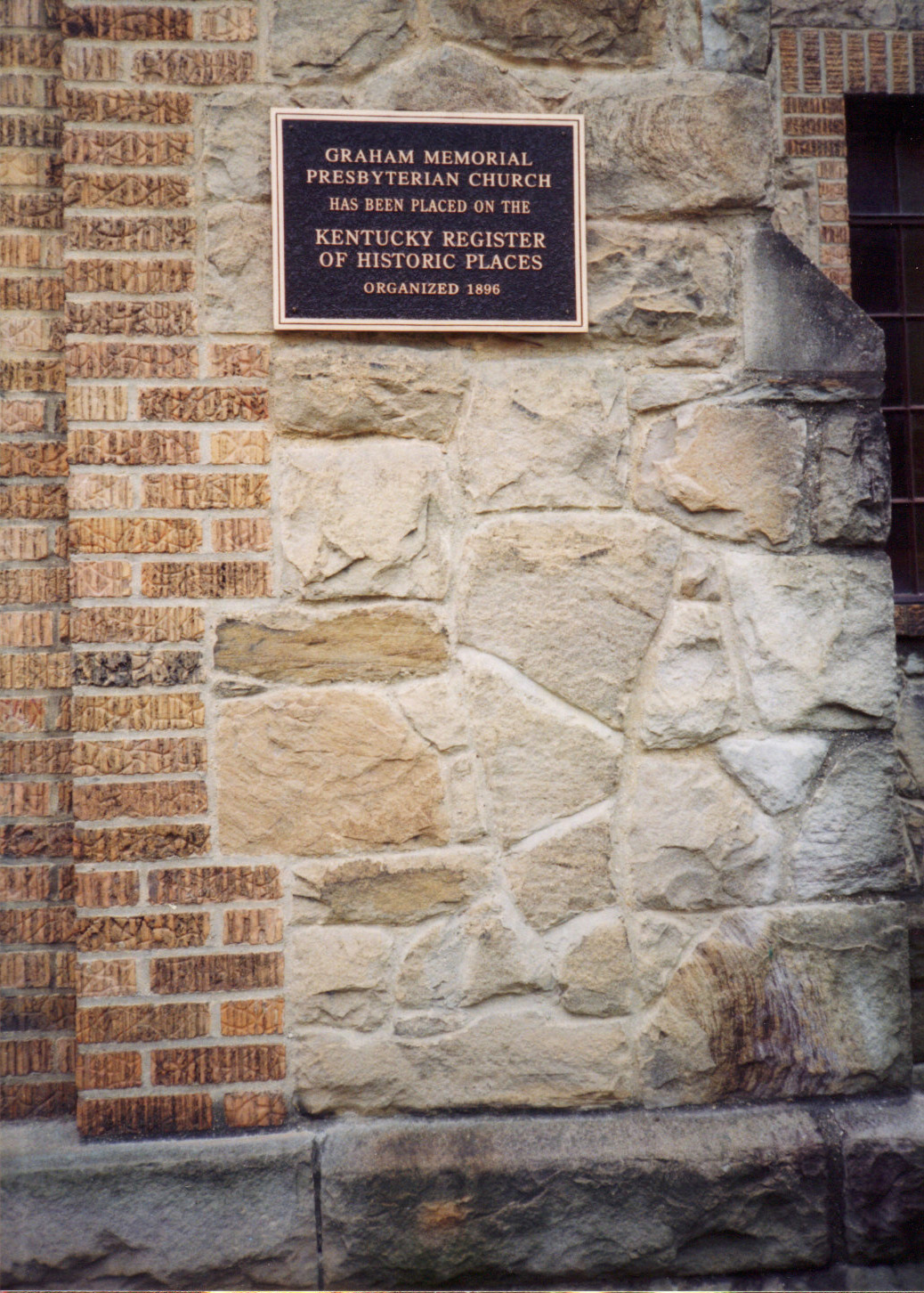
Facade of the Graham Memorial Presbyterian Church in Whitesburg (built in 1934 by Italian immigrant stonemasons), featuring the outline of a map of Italy

Whitesburg is the home of Appalshop, a nonprofit aimed at helping people tell stories and educate others about Appalachia.

- Country Music Highway Road Rally - This antique car rally begins at Greenup, Kentucky, traverses the length of U.S. 23 in Kentucky, and ends at Whitesburg. Held during the peak color season in October, the rally draws sightseers from around the nation. Every county along the route is the home of at least one country music artist.
- Cowan Creek Mountain Music School - A set of week-long intensive classes in banjo, guitar, fiddle, square dance, storytelling and singing. The school is held in late June at the community of Cowan and in Whitesburg. It is open to children and adults.
- Letcher County Marching Invitational - On the last Saturday of October, the Letcher County Central High School Marching Band hosts a day of competition for marching bands from southeast Kentucky, southwest Virginia, and northeast Tennessee. The contest has brought in groups from five states.
- Riverside Days, formally Jenkins Days, is a three-day event held at Riverside Park in Whitesburg, next to the hospital. The festival includes country headliners, sponsored by Jenkins Festival Committee, Inc. and Coca-Cola; Mountain Outreach Idol; local performers; bluegrass; Gospel; Rock; Country; food and craft booths; rides; a mechanical bull; bungee jump; prizes and fun.
- The Mountain Heritage Festival - Fall festival held annually the last weekend of September. The festival features talent shows, concerts, arts and crafts, food booths, a parade, and window display competition.

== Notable people ==
- Margaret Katherine Banks, 26th president of Texas A&M University and the former dean of the College of Engineering
- Harry M. Caudill, author, historian, professor, lawyer, legislator, and environmentalist, 1922–1990
- Jessamyn Duke, former martial arts fighter and Former professional wrestler who competed in WWE from 2018 to 2021
- Emery L. Frazier, mayor, state representative, Chief Clerk of the U.S. Senate, Secretary of the U.S. Senate, 1896–1973
- Tom Gish, publisher of The Mountain Eagle
- Goebel Ritter, player for the New York Knicks (1948–1951), and assistant superintendent of Whitesburg schools
- Lee Sexton, traditional Appalachian banjo musician
- Robb Webb, voice artist
