= Letcher County, Kentucky =

County in Kentucky, United States

- County
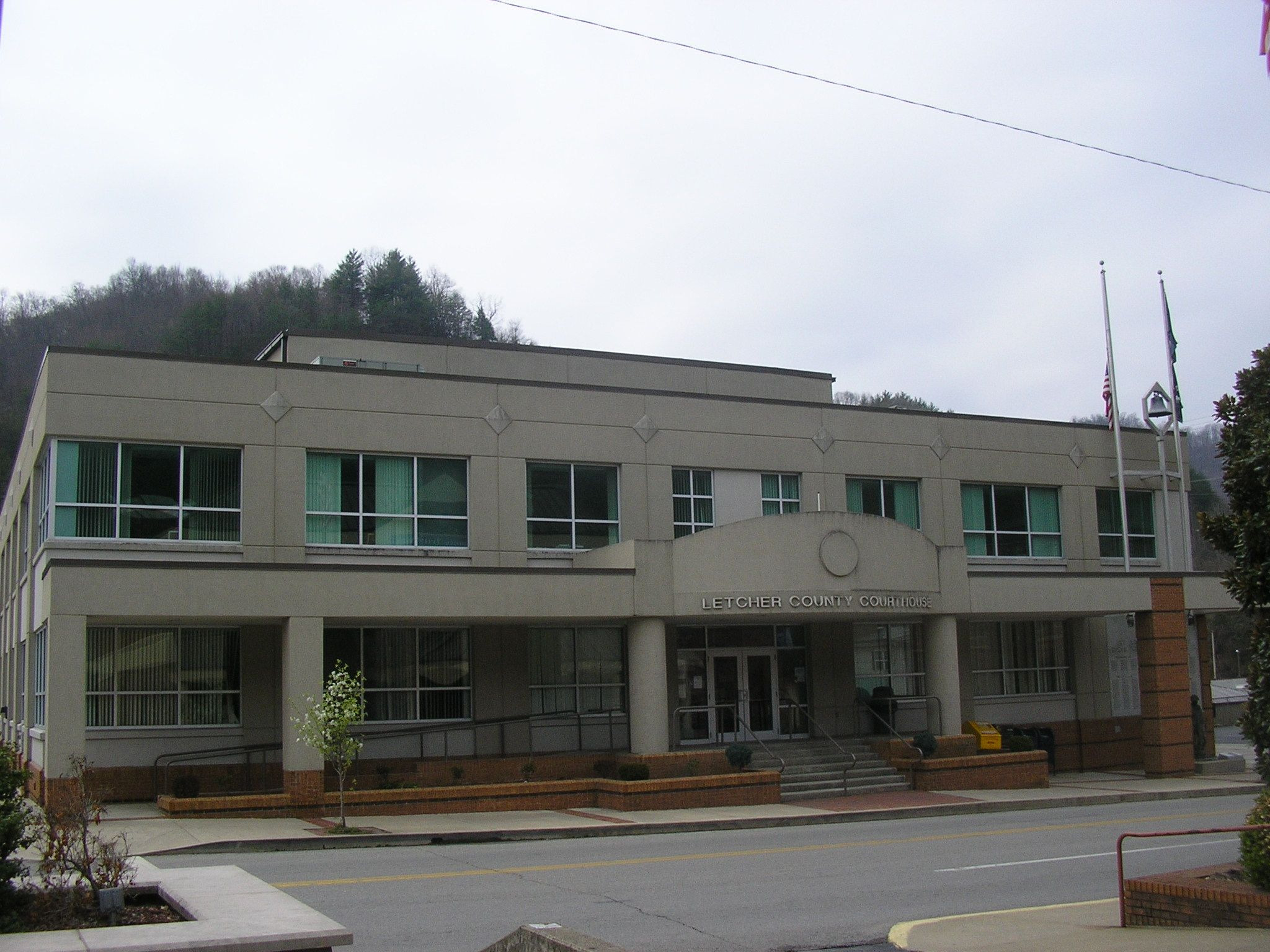
- Letcher County courthouse in Whitesburg

- Location within the U.S. state of Kentucky
- Coordinates: 37°07′N 82°51′W
- Country: United States
- State: Kentucky
- Founded: 1842
- Named for: Robert P. Letcher
- Seat: Whitesburg
- Largest city: Jenkins

Government
  - Judge/Executive: Terry Adams (R)

Area
  - Total: 339 sq mi (880 km^{2})
  - Land: 338 sq mi (880 km^{2})
  - Water: 1.1 sq mi (2.8 km^{2}) 0.3%

Population (2020)
  - Total: 21,548
  - Estimate (2025): 19,952 ▼
  - Density: 63.8/sq mi (24.6/km^{2})
- Time zone: UTC−5 (Eastern)
  - Summer (DST): UTC−4 (EDT)
- Congressional district: 5th
- Website: letchercounty.ky.gov

Letcher County is a county located in the U.S. state of Kentucky. As of the 2020 census, the population was 21,548. Its county seat is Whitesburg. It was created in 1842 from Harlan and Perry counties, and named for Robert P. Letcher, Governor of Kentucky from 1840 to 1844.

== History ==
=== Settlement and early history ===
The area now known as Letcher County was first settled in the early–1800s by the Back, Caudill, Dixon, Stamper, Collier, Lewis, Whitaker, Wright, Craft, Brown, Halcomb, Holbrook, and Bentley families. These early families were later joined by the Maggard, Banks, Day, Fields, Morgan, Blair, Breeding, Frazier, Baker, Hogg, Combs, and Mullins families. The first permanent settlement in the county was settled in 1803, at the mouth of Pert Creek, in modern-day Whitesburg. In 1804, George Ison II and his family settled in the area of Linefork. Later, Benjamin Webb brought a group of settlers from Wilkes Co. North Carolina and settled at the mouth of Boone Fork in modern-day Kona, but later moved down towards the mouth of Bottom Fork in modern-day Mayking. Most communities and geographic features in the area were named after these early pioneer families. Most of these early communities were economically supported by timber logging.

=== Formation ===
Map of Letcher County in 1911

In 1842, the residents of modern-day Letcher County petitioned the state legislature for a new county, as at that time they belonged to Harlan, Perry, and Pike counties. The legislature met in January 1842, and decided to form the new county. The county was formed, as Kentucky's 95th county, from portions of Harlan, Perry, and Pike counties, and named for Robert P. Letcher, who was the governor of Kentucky at that time. Its county seat, Whitesburg, was called Summit City before becoming the county seat. The city was renamed from Summit City to Whitesburg in 1842, in honor of John D. White, who introduced the county's enactment bill in the Kentucky General Assembly. The state government commissioned members of the general assembly to draw the boundaries for the new county. These men were Nathaniel Collins, Stephen Hiram Hogg, Benjamin Adams, and Benjamin Webb. In 1858, 60 square miles from Perry County were added to the county's original 340 square miles. In April 1884, a ten-mile section from Pike County was added, and a month later, Letcher County contributed 80 square miles toward the creation of Knott County.

=== History of the courthouse ===
Mose Adams log cabin, where the first court session was held in 1842

At first, residents could not agree where the county seat would be located. Some residents wanted the seat to be in Mayking, others wanted the seat to be in Camp Branch or Indian Bottom. The debate was settled when Stephen Hiram Hogg donated his land in Whitesburg for the building of the courthouse. The first court session was held in a log cabin owned by Mose Adams at the Adams settlement, which was located two-miles up the North Fork Kentucky River from Whitesburg. John A. Caudill was hired to build the new courthouse and completed it in 1844.

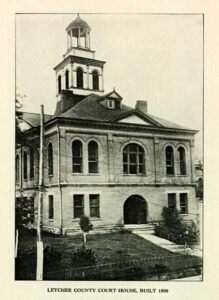
The third courthouse built by Lemuel R. Perry in 1898 and existed until the 1960s

The first courthouse built by Caudill was built of logs, and had plank trimming. It was demolished in 1897 due to its failing condition and Lemuel R. Perry was commissioned to construct a replacement. The new courthouse was built of bricks, and had a large cupola, with a bell inside to call the jury into session. This new courthouse was heated by stoves and fireplaces until an addition was built in the late–1930s, by the Works Progress Administration. By the 1960s, the courthouse was deemed too small, and prisoners in the jail on the top floor would often escape by pushing apart the bars, climbing out the window, and sliding down a rope of bedsheets. The Area Redevelopment Administration provided funding to build a new one.

William Banton Moore, an architect from Louisville, was hired to design the new courthouse. Ramsey and Clubb, a construction company from Shelbyville, Kentucky, was hired to build it. It was completed in 1965, and a dedication ceremony was held with governor Bert Combs in attendance. The new courthouse had a contemporary design with blue and beige panels. It also had a jail located on the top floor and a public library at the bottom. The construction of the new courthouse cost about US$650,000. Many locals were dissatisfied with the new courthouse, thinking it looked like a gas station.

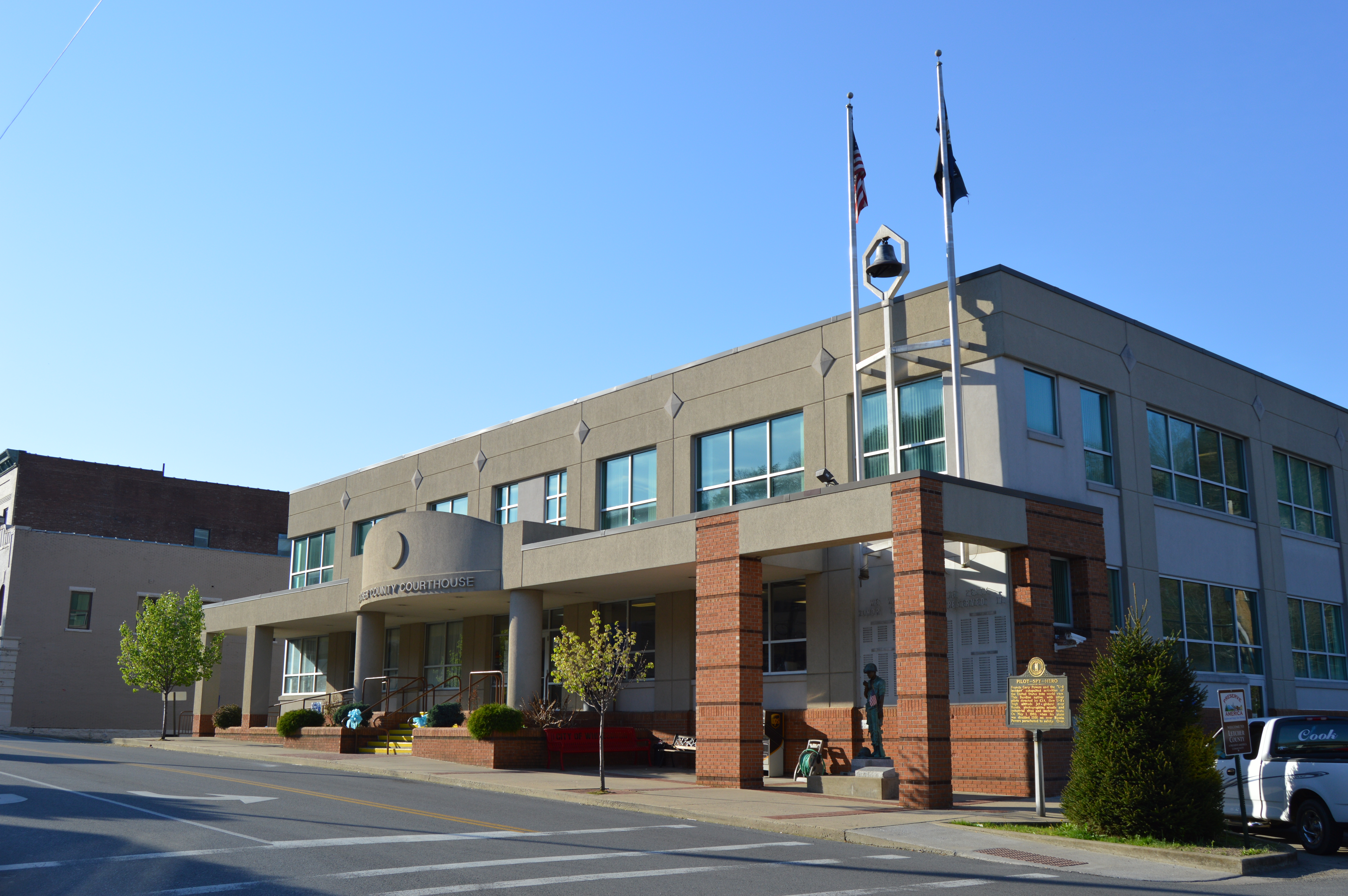
The Letcher County Courthouse, remodeled in 1998. The bell at the front was the same one that was used to call the court into session in the old courthouse

By the 1990s, the courthouse was in disrepair, and state officials were threatening to close the top floor. Local government officials were able to obtain federal funding, and the building was remodeled in 1998. The jail, which was located at the top floor of the building, was moved to the bottom floor, and a statue honoring veterans was moved to the front of the building in the new version of the Letcher County courthouse.

=== Coal ===
Due to its rugged terrain, Letcher County is one of the most remote counties in Kentucky, and until the arrival of coal mining, its population never peaked above 10,000. In the early 1900s, coal mining began in the county. This caused an economic boom as many small communities grew to large coal towns supported by coal companies. By 1940, the county's population had grown to over 40,000. Between 1990 and 2014, Letcher County produced over 600,000,000 short tons (540,000,000 t) of coal.

=== Modern period ===
Harry M. Caudill's 1963 book, Night Comes to the Cumberlands: A Biography of a Depressed Area, brought the county to national attention. The CBS documentary Christmas in Appalachia (1964) hosted by Charles Kuralt also brought the nation's attention to Letcher County as citizens sent clothes and gifts in response to the conditions of those featured.

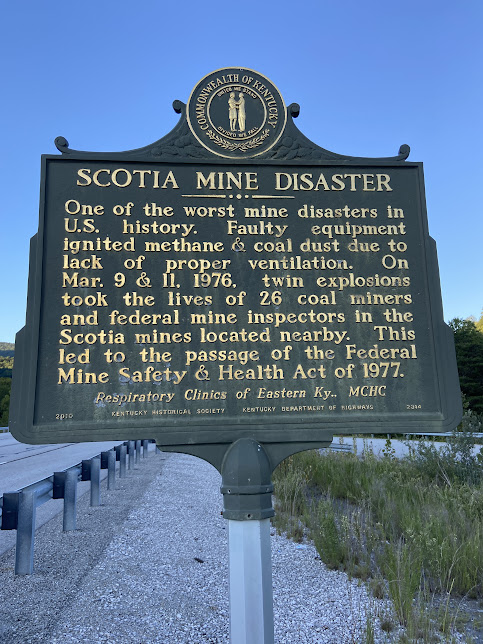
Scotia mine disaster historical sign

On March 9, 1976, in the community of Oven Fork, an explosion caused by coal dust and gasses occurred at the Scotia Mine, resulting in the deaths of 15 miners. Two days later another explosion occurred, killing 11 more miners. Investigators concluded that the explosions were caused by methane gases that were ignited by a spark caused by a battery-powered device. The accidents are often considered two of the worst mining disasters in U.S. history. The two explosions led to the passage of the Federal Mine Safety and Health Act of 1977.

In July–August 2022, floods came through Eastern Kentucky. A total of 45 people died, three of those deaths occurred in Letcher County. As a result of the floods, many people were left homeless.

On September 19, 2024, then-County Sheriff Shawn Michael (Mickey) Stines was arrested for shooting and killing District Judge Kevin Mullins in his chambers.

== Geography ==
Letcher County is located in the far southeast of Kentucky. Most of its border is defined by mountains. The 125-mile long Pine Mountain divides the county, and defines part of the county's border with Harlan County and Virginia. To the south, Black Mountain marks its border with Virginia.

The county's terrain is defined by rugged mountains and blanketed by forests. Jefferson National Forest covers a significant portion of the county. The county's highest point is Black Mountain, located in the southeastern corner of the county, with an elevation of 3,700 feet.

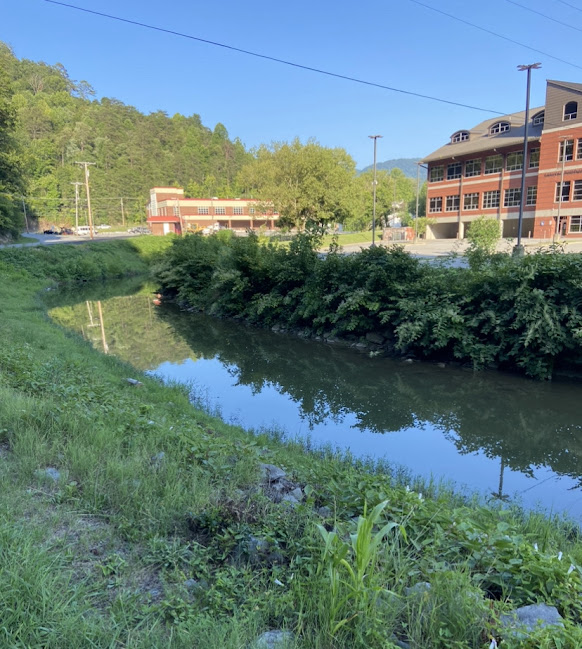
North Fork of the Kentucky River flowing through Whitesburg, Kentucky

The northern part of the county is drained by Rockhouse Creek, which empties into the North Fork Kentucky River near Blackey, Kentucky. The central portion of the county is drained by the North Fork Kentucky River, which flows from its start at the Kentucky–Virginia border, to where it meets the South Fork Kentucky River in Lee County, Kentucky, to form the Kentucky River. The southern part of the county is drained by the Poor Fork, which flows from its start on Pine Mountain, to Baxter in Harlan County, Kentucky, where it meets Martin's Fork to form the Cumberland River. The western portion of the county is drained by Elkhorn Creek, which flows from its start near Jenkins, Kentucky, to its confluence with Russell Fork in Pike County, Kentucky.

According to the United States Census Bureau, the county has a total area of 339 square miles (880 km^{2}), of which 338 square miles (880 km^{2}) is land and 1.1 square miles (2.8 km^{2}) (0.3%) is water.

=== Fishpond Lake ===
Fishpond Lake is a 28.8 acres (11.7 ha) man-made body of water near Jenkins, in Payne Gap, Kentucky. It was formed in 1961 by the impoundment of Fishpond Branch. At its deepest it is 79 feet and averages around 33 feet. The lake is home to several species of fish including rainbow trout, channel catfish, and flathead catfish. It is the only large body of water (other than rivers) in Letcher County.

=== Pioneer Horse Trail controversy ===
In an effort to bring tourists to Letcher County and to revitalize the local economy, the Pioneer Horse Trail was constructed on Pine Mountain. The trail, part of an "adventure tourism" initiative spearheaded by then Governor Steve Beshear, Beshear's wife Jane, and Lieutenant Governor Daniel Mongiardo, was completed in 2009.

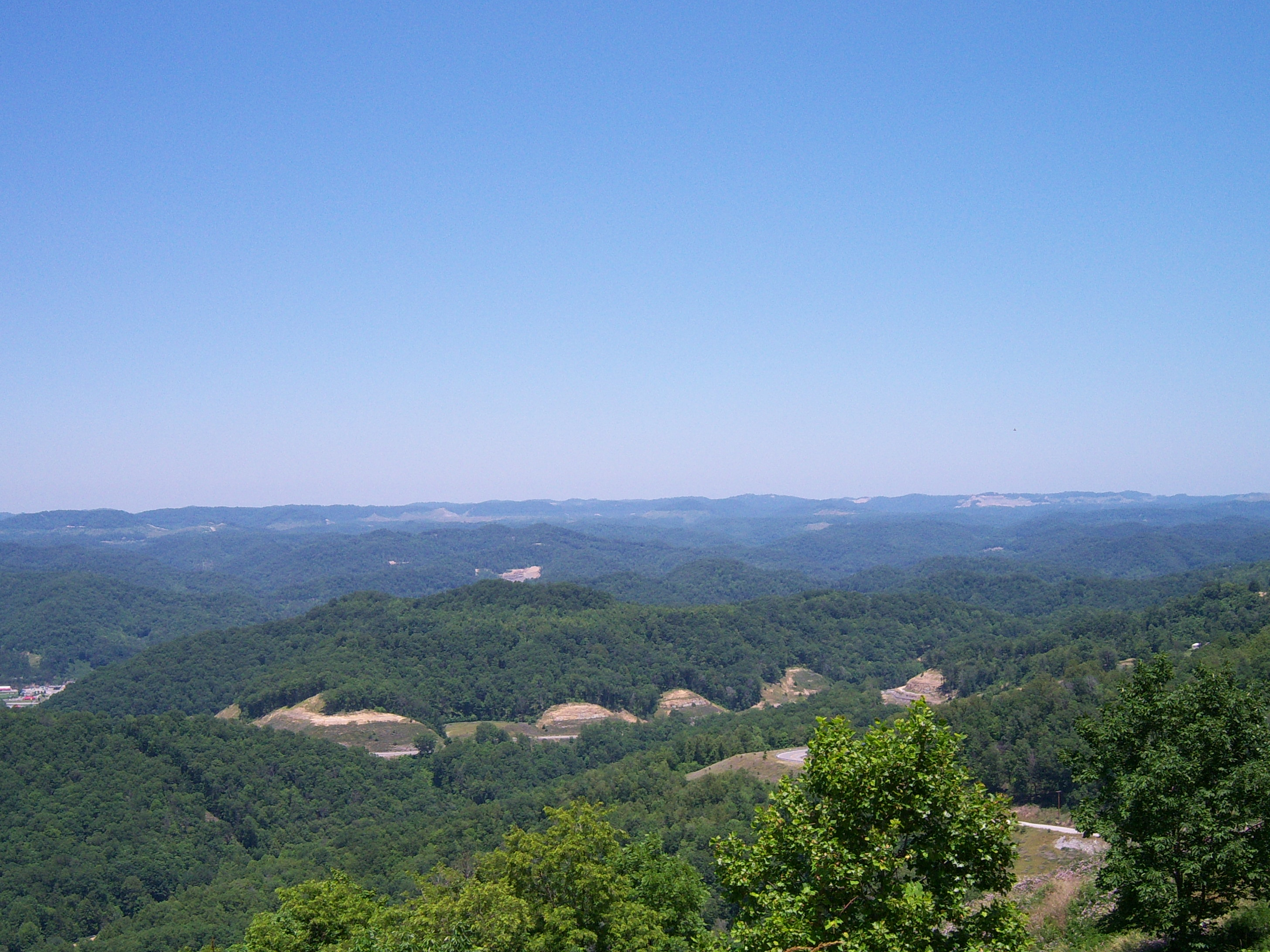
View from Pine Mountain near Whitesburg, Kentucky.

However, controversy arose about whether the environment would be harmed during construction. In the summer of 2008, the Letcher County Fiscal Court had signed an agreement with state officials stating that the county would do an environmental impact study before construction would begin. Documents obtained by the Lexington Herald-Leader under Kentucky's Open Records Act showed that construction actually began before the study was to take place. County-owned bulldozers started clearing trees in part of a wildlife management area in which heavy equipment was not permitted. Environmental groups asked the U.S. Fish and Wildlife Service to determine if any species on the threatened or endangered list were harmed.

=== Adjacent counties ===
- Knott County (northwest)
- Pike County (northeast)
- Wise County, Virginia (southeast)
- Harlan County (south)
- Perry County (southwest)

=== National protected area ===
- Jefferson National Forest (part)

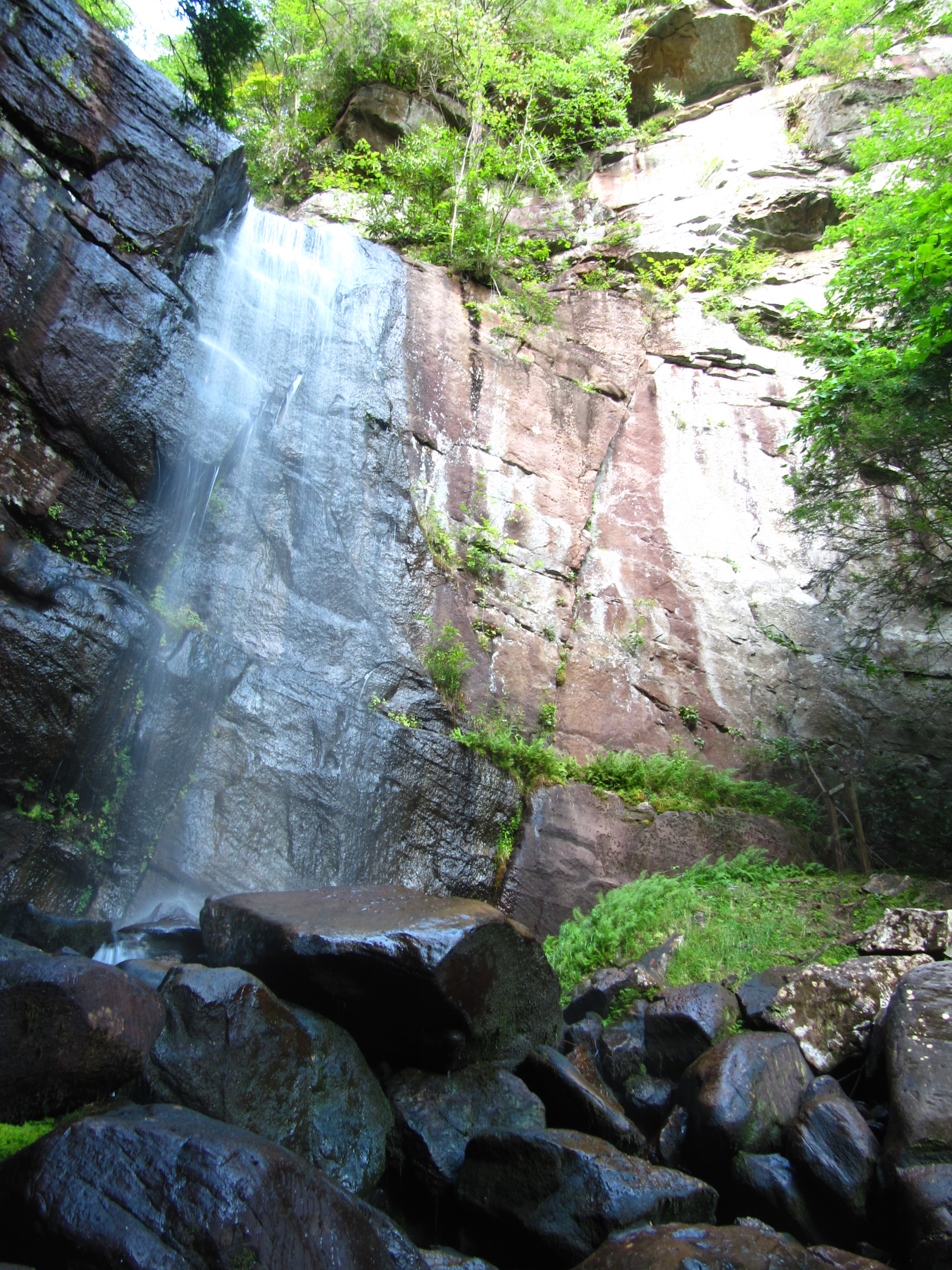
Bad Branch Falls

=== State protected area ===
- Bad Branch Falls State Nature Preserve
- Lilley Cornett Woods Experiment Station (Eastern Kentucky University)

=== State Parks ===
- Kingdom Come State Park (part)
- Pine Mountain Trail State Scenic Trail (part)

== Demographics ==
Historical population
Census	Pop.	Note	%±
1850	2,512		—
1860	3,904		55.4%
1870	4,608		18.0%
1880	6,601		43.3%
1890	6,920		4.8%
1900	9,172		32.5%
1910	10,623		15.8%
1920	24,467		130.3%
1930	35,702		45.9%
1940	40,592		13.7%
1950	39,522		−2.6%
1960	30,102		−23.8%
1970	23,165		−23.0%
1980	30,687		32.5%
1990	27,000		−12.0%
2000	25,277		−6.4%
2010	24,519		−3.0%
2020	21,548		−12.1%
2025 (est.)	19,952	▼	−7.4%
U.S. Decennial Census; 1790–1960 1900–1990; 1990–2000 2010–2020

=== 2020 census ===
As of the 2020 census, the county had a population of 21,548. The median age was 43.6 years. 21.3% of residents were under the age of 18 and 19.5% of residents were 65 years of age or older. For every 100 females there were 98.1 males, and for every 100 females age 18 and over there were 94.8 males age 18 and over.

The racial makeup of the county was 96.7% White, 0.4% Black or African American, 0.2% American Indian and Alaska Native, 0.3% Asian, 0.0% Native Hawaiian and Pacific Islander, 0.2% from some other race, and 2.3% from two or more races. Hispanic or Latino residents of any race comprised 0.6% of the population.

0.0% of residents lived in urban areas, while 100.0% lived in rural areas.

There were 9,047 households in the county, of which 28.9% had children under the age of 18 living with them and 28.7% had a female householder with no spouse or partner present. About 30.4% of all households were made up of individuals and 13.5% had someone living alone who was 65 years of age or older.

There were 10,520 housing units, of which 14.0% were vacant. Among occupied housing units, 75.2% were owner-occupied and 24.8% were renter-occupied. The homeowner vacancy rate was 1.1% and the rental vacancy rate was 7.3%.

=== 2000 census ===
As of the census of 2000, there were 25,277 people, 10,085 households, and 7,462 families residing in the county. The population density was 75 per square mile (29/km^{2}). There were 11,405 housing units at an average density of 34 per square mile (13/km^{2}). The racial makeup of the county was 98.71% White, 0.51% Black or African American, 0.10% Native American, 0.28% Asian, 0.02% Pacific Islander, 0.03% from other races, and 0.35% from two or more races. 0.44% of the population were Hispanic or Latino of any race.

There were 10,085 households, out of which 32.30% had children under the age of 18 living with them, 58.40% were married couples living together, 11.50% had a female householder with no husband present, and 26.00% were non-families. 24.10% of all households were made up of individuals, and 10.10% had someone living alone who was 65 years of age or older. The average household size was 2.48 and the average family size was 2.94.

The age distribution was 23.70% under the age of 18, 9.20% from 18 to 24, 28.70% from 25 to 44, 25.80% from 45 to 64, and 12.60% who were 65 years of age or older. The median age was 38 years. For every 100 females there were 95.80 males. For every 100 females age 18 and over, there were 92.10 males.

The median income for a household in the county was $21,110, and the median income for a family was $24,869. Males had a median income of $30,488 versus $17,902 for females. The per capita income for the county was $11,984. About 23.70% of families and 27.10% of the population were below the poverty line, including 35.90% of those under age 18 and 21.20% of those age 65 or over.

== Education ==
=== Letcher County Public Schools ===
Most K-12 students in the county, with the exception of those living in the far eastern part of the county surrounding Jenkins, are served by the Letcher County Public Schools. The district operates six elementary/middle schools, one high school, one vocational school, and an alternative education center. The superintendent of Letcher County Schools as of 2018 is Denise Yonts. The schools located in the district are:

- Cowan Elementary School – Whitesburg
- Fleming-Neon Middle School – Fleming-Neon
- Letcher County Central High School – Whitesburg
- Letcher Elementary and Middle School – Blackey
- Martha Jane Potter Elementary – Whitesburg
- West Whitesburg Elementary – Whitesburg
- Whitesburg Middle School – Whitesburg
- Letcher County Alternative Education Center – Whitesburg
- Letcher County Area Technology Center – Whitesburg

=== Jenkins Independent Schools ===
Students in the Jenkins area are served by the Jenkins Independent Schools, which operates one elementary school and a combined middle and high school with grades 7–12. The superintendent of Jenkins Independent Schools is Damian Johnson. The schools located in the district are:

- Burdine Elementary School – Burdine
- Jenkins Middle and High School – Jenkins

== Politics and government ==
United States presidential election results for Letcher County, Kentucky
Year	Republican		Democratic		Third party(ies)	
Year	No.	%	No.	%	No.	%
1912	978	49.67%	611	31.03%	380	19.30%
1916	2,220	65.99%	1,121	33.32%	23	0.68%
1920	4,317	68.51%	1,960	31.11%	24	0.38%
1924	3,172	54.96%	1,912	33.13%	687	11.90%
1928	5,400	60.55%	3,502	39.27%	16	0.18%
1932	4,732	47.44%	5,190	52.03%	53	0.53%
1936	3,871	38.24%	6,240	61.65%	11	0.11%
1940	4,433	41.90%	6,127	57.92%	19	0.18%
1944	4,055	46.77%	4,599	53.04%	16	0.18%
1948	3,560	42.65%	4,741	56.80%	46	0.55%
1952	4,689	47.92%	5,097	52.08%	0	0.00%
1956	5,741	57.97%	4,133	41.73%	30	0.30%
1960	4,408	50.87%	4,258	49.13%	0	0.00%
1964	2,632	32.64%	5,420	67.22%	11	0.14%
1968	3,243	42.30%	3,499	45.64%	925	12.06%
1972	4,213	58.54%	2,908	40.41%	76	1.06%
1976	3,122	40.29%	4,590	59.24%	36	0.46%
1980	3,426	43.82%	4,280	54.75%	112	1.43%
1984	4,073	46.13%	4,707	53.31%	50	0.57%
1988	3,601	43.16%	4,697	56.29%	46	0.55%
1992	3,011	29.84%	5,817	57.65%	1,262	12.51%
1996	2,222	30.75%	4,160	57.57%	844	11.68%
2000	4,092	45.54%	4,698	52.29%	195	2.17%
2004	4,801	52.96%	4,192	46.24%	72	0.79%
2008	5,367	65.17%	2,623	31.85%	245	2.98%
2012	6,811	77.77%	1,702	19.43%	245	2.80%
2016	7,293	79.84%	1,542	16.88%	299	3.27%
2020	7,226	79.10%	1,799	19.69%	110	1.20%
2024	6,848	81.03%	1,457	17.24%	146	1.73%

=== Elected officials ===
Elected officials as of January 3, 2025
U.S. House	Hal Rogers (R)	KY 5
Ky. Senate	Scott Madon (R)	29
Ky. House	Mitch Whitaker (R)	94

=== Presidential elections ===
Letcher County has a somewhat similar political history to West Virginia. Under the Fourth Party System it was a reliable Republican county, voting Republican in every election from 1884 to 1928. However, with increasing unionization under the New Deal it turned for the next sixty to seventy years into a fairly solid Democratic county, apart from the 1956 and 1972 landslides and the candidacy of John F. Kennedy. However, since 2004 as the Democratic Party has become opposed to coal production due to global warming issues, it has become a solidly Republican county.

=== Governor ===
In the 2023 Kentucky Gubernatorial Election, popular incumbent Governor Andy Beshear won Letcher County by a margin of 4 points, marking the first instance since 2015 that a Democrat clinched victory in the county in any statewide race.

=== Senate ===
Letcher County is a solid Republican county in Senate elections, having re-elected Republican Rand Paul in 2022 with 67.6% (3,873 votes) of the vote over Democrat Charles Booker. In 2020, the county re-elected Republican Mitch McConnell with 71% (6,441 votes) of the vote over Democrat Amy McGrath.

=== House ===
Letcher County is part of Kentucky's 5th congressional district, represented by Republican Hal Rogers. It re-elected Rogers in 2022, with 79% (4,538 votes) of the vote over Democrat Conor Halbleib.

=== State senate ===
Letcher County is part of Kentucky's 29th Senate district, which is represented by Republican Scott Madon. It voted to elect Johnnie L. Turner in 2020, with 54.8% (4,900 votes) of the vote over 20-year Democratic incumbent Johnny Ray Turner.

=== State house ===
Letcher County is part of Kentucky's 94th house district, represented by Republican Mitch Whitaker of Fleming-Neon. In 2022, it voted to re-elect Democratic representative Angie Hatton, with 60.7% of the vote.

=== Local government ===
==== Judge/executive ====
The Judge/Executive is responsible for executing legislation, executing laws passed by the state, informing the fiscal court with the operations of the county departments, boards, and commissions, demanding all offices, departments, boards, commissions, to make an annual financial report to the fiscal court, submitting an annual budget to the fiscal court, administering budget plans passed by the fiscal court, informing the fiscal court with the financial state and needs of the county, and supervising, appointing, removing, or suspending county officials. The judge/executive as of 2024 is Republican Terry Adams.

==== County attorney ====
The County Attorney is the legal counsel for the county government. The county attorney's role is to give legal advice to the fiscal court and county officials, and act as a legal representative to county departments, board, or commissions. The county attorney is Democrat Jamie Hatton.

==== Commonwealth attorney ====
The Commonwealth Attorney is responsible for attending each circuit court held in their judicial circuit. The Commonwealth attorney has the ability to prosecute violations, and present evidence to a grand jury. As of July 2024, the Commonwealth attorney is Matt Butler.

==== Property valuation administrator ====
The property valuation administrator has the ability to assess property within the county and prepare property records. The property valuation administrator is Democrat Ricky Rose.

==== Sheriff ====
The sheriff has the responsibility to collect taxes, election duties, provide service to courts, and enforce laws. The sheriff has the ability to make arrests within their county, and collect taxes from properties, the county, and school districts. The sheriff was Democrat Mickey Stines until his arrest for murder in September 2024 and subsequent resignation. (Note: Stines was arrested in connection with the killing of Kevin Mullins on September 19, 2024.)

==== Court clerk ====
The court clerk has the ability to issue and register and record legal records, register voter polls, and conduct election and tax duties. The county clerk is Democrat Winston Meade.

==== Circuit court clerk ====
The circuit court clerk is responsible for managing records of the circuit court. The circuit court clerk is Mike Watts.

==== Jailer ====
The jailer manages the county jail, and all prisoners in the jail. The jailer has the ability to transport prisoners, manage the jail budget, prepare bail, work and education release for prisoners, do community service, and manage all the deputies. The jailer is Democrat Brian Slone (Son of previous Jailer Burt Slone who retired from this position) .

==== Coroner ====
The main responsibility of the coroner is to decide and certify the cause of death. The coroner is Democrat Perry M. Fowler.

==== Circuit court ====
Letcher County is a part of the 47th Judicial District. The circuit court deals with civil issues, capital offenses, felonies, land disputes, and probate cases. The circuit court can also supply injunctions, writs of prohibition, and writs of mandamus. The circuit court has the ability to dissolve marriages, hear cases of child custody, visitation, distribution of property, adoption, and parental rights. The circuit judge serves an eight-year term. The circuit judge is James W. Craft II.

==== District judge ====
The district judge manages juvenile issues, city and county laws, misdemeanors, violations, traffic offenses, probate of wills, arraignments, domestic violence and abuse, and small civil issues. Until his September 2024 murder, the district judge was Kevin R. Mullins.

==== Magistrate ====
Letcher County is divided into five magisterial districts. The magistrates are representatives of the fiscal court, and works with the Judge/Executive in managing the county government. Magistrates also serve as Justice of the peace and, if permitted by the Judge/Executive, can perform marriages. The magistrates are:

- District 1 – Jack Banks
- District 2 – Kenny Anderson
- District 3 – Debra Collier
- District 4 – William "Cheddy" Smith
- District 5 – Bennie McCall

==== School board ====
Letcher County is divided into five school board districts. Members of the school board serve staggered four year terms and are not subject to term limits. The members of the school board are:

- District 1 – Lena Parsons
- District 2 – Robert Kiser
- District 3 – William Smith
- District 4 – Mendy Boggs
- District 5 – Shawn Gilley

=== Voter registration ===
As of April 2024, Letcher County has 8,677 registered Democrats, 5,906 Republicans, 351 third party voters, 368 registered Independents, 37 Libertarians, 2 Greens, and 2 Constitution party voters.

== Economy ==
=== Coal companies in Letcher County ===
- Alpha Natural Resources
- James River Coal Company
- Rhino Resource Partners
- United Coal Company

== Media ==
=== Television ===
Two Public-access television cable TV channels serve Letcher County. The Letcher County Government Channel is Government-access television (GATV), operated by the Letcher County Fiscal Court and airs government meetings, local events, and emergency information. LCPS-TV is operated by the Letcher County Public Schools and airs school announcements, events, and Educational access television programs.

=== Radio ===
- WTCW
- WXKQ-FM
- WMMT (FM), community radio station owned by Appalshop
- WIFX-FM
- WNKW

=== Newspapers ===
Two newspapers serve Letcher County. The Mountain Eagle is a weekly newspaper located in Whitesburg. It has been in operation since 1907 and is owned, edited, and published by the Gish family. The Letcher County Community News-Press is a weekly newspaper located in Cromona, near Fleming-Neon, that has been in operation since 1988.

== Transportation ==
Public transportation is provided by LKLP Community Action Partnership with demand-response service and scheduled service from Whitesburg to Hazard.

=== Highways ===
- U.S. Highway 23 – Crosses the eastern part of the county and runs west of Jenkins.
- U.S. Highway 119 – Diverges off from U.S. 23, connects Jenkins to Whitesburg, crosses Pine Mountain, runs across the southern part of the county, and crosses into Harlan County.
- Kentucky Route 15 – Diverges off from U.S. 119, connects Whitesburg to Isom, and runs somewhat northwest into Knott County.

== Communities ==
=== Cities ===
- Fleming-Neon
- Jenkins
- Whitesburg (county seat)

=== Census-designated places ===
- Mayking
- McRoberts
- Millstone
- Payne Gap

=== Other unincorporated places ===
- Beefhide (partial)
- Blackey
- Burdine
- Deane
- Dongola
- Dunham
- Eolia
- Ermine
- Gaskill
- Gilley
- Hemphill
- Isom
- Jeremiah
- Letcher
- Oven Fork
- Partridge
- Seco
- Uz

== Notable people ==
=== Gallery ===
Kenny Baker, Bluegrass fiddler and member of the Blue Grass Boys

Harry M. Caudill, author, politician, activist, environmentalist, and author of Night Comes to the Cumberlands

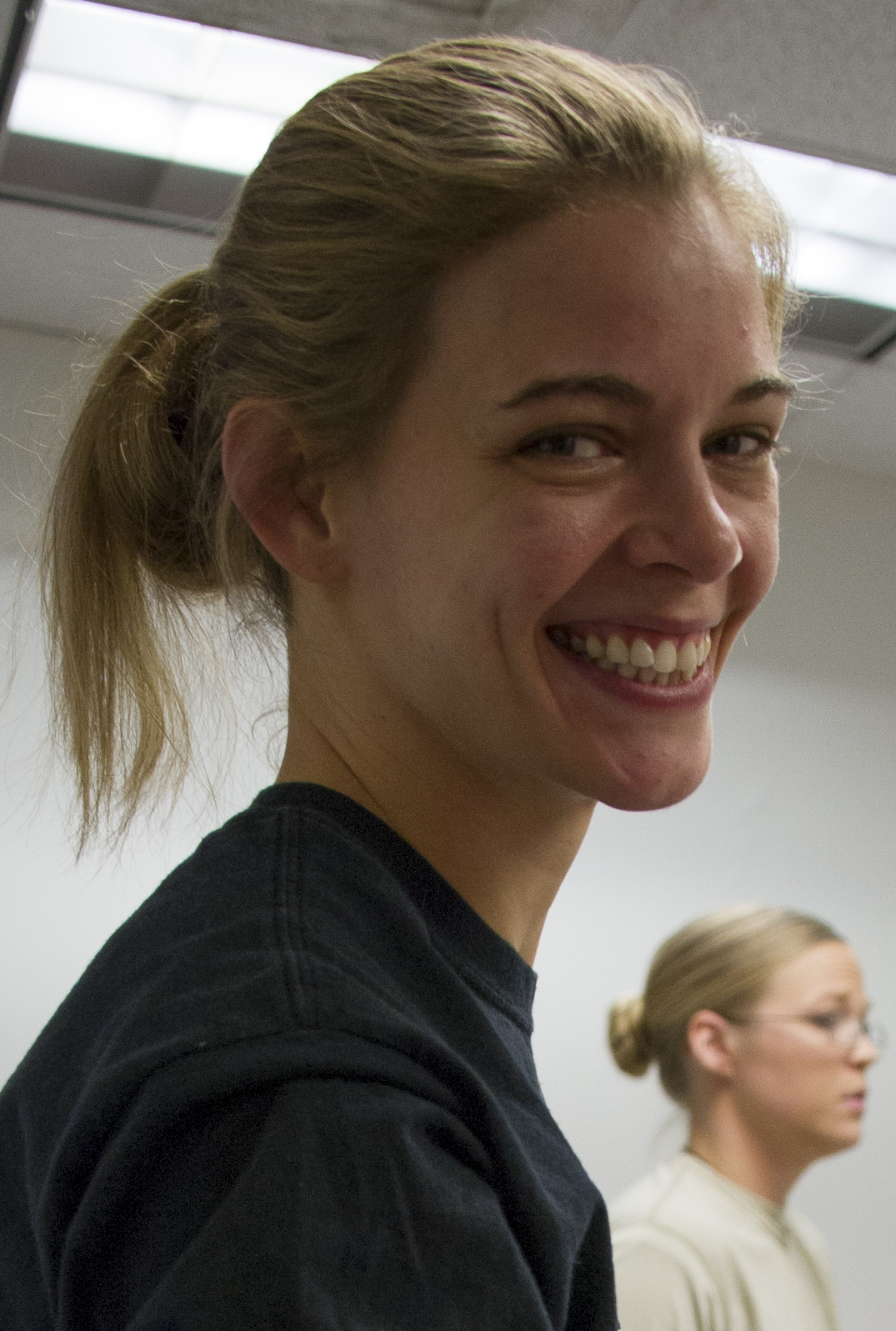
Jessamyn Duke, professional wrestler out of Richmond, Kentucky

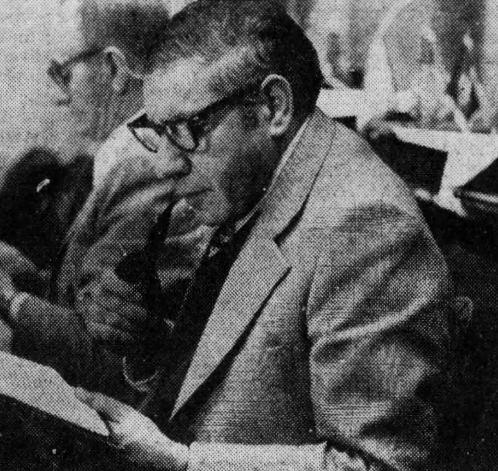
Hoover Dawahare, member of the Kentucky House of Representatives from 1974 to 1986

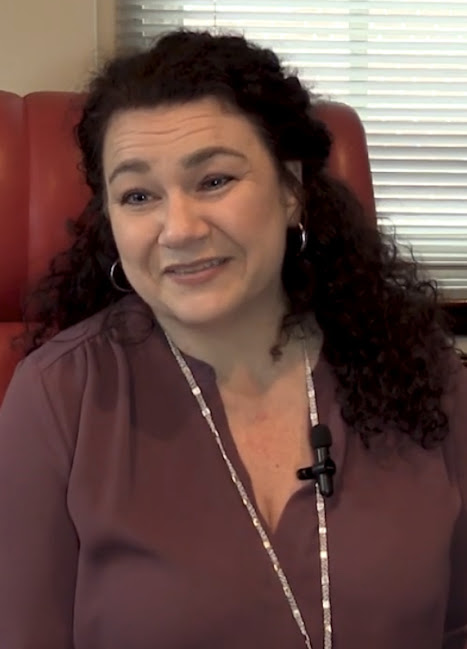
Angela Hatton, member of the Kentucky House of Representatives from 2017 to 2023

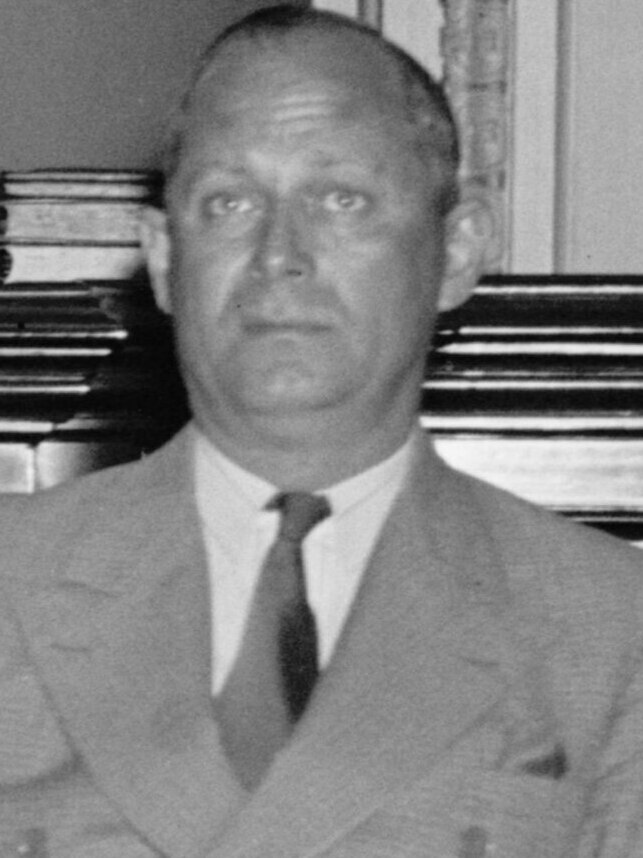
Emery L. Frazier, former mayor of Whitesburg, Kentucky and Secretary of the United States Senate in 1966

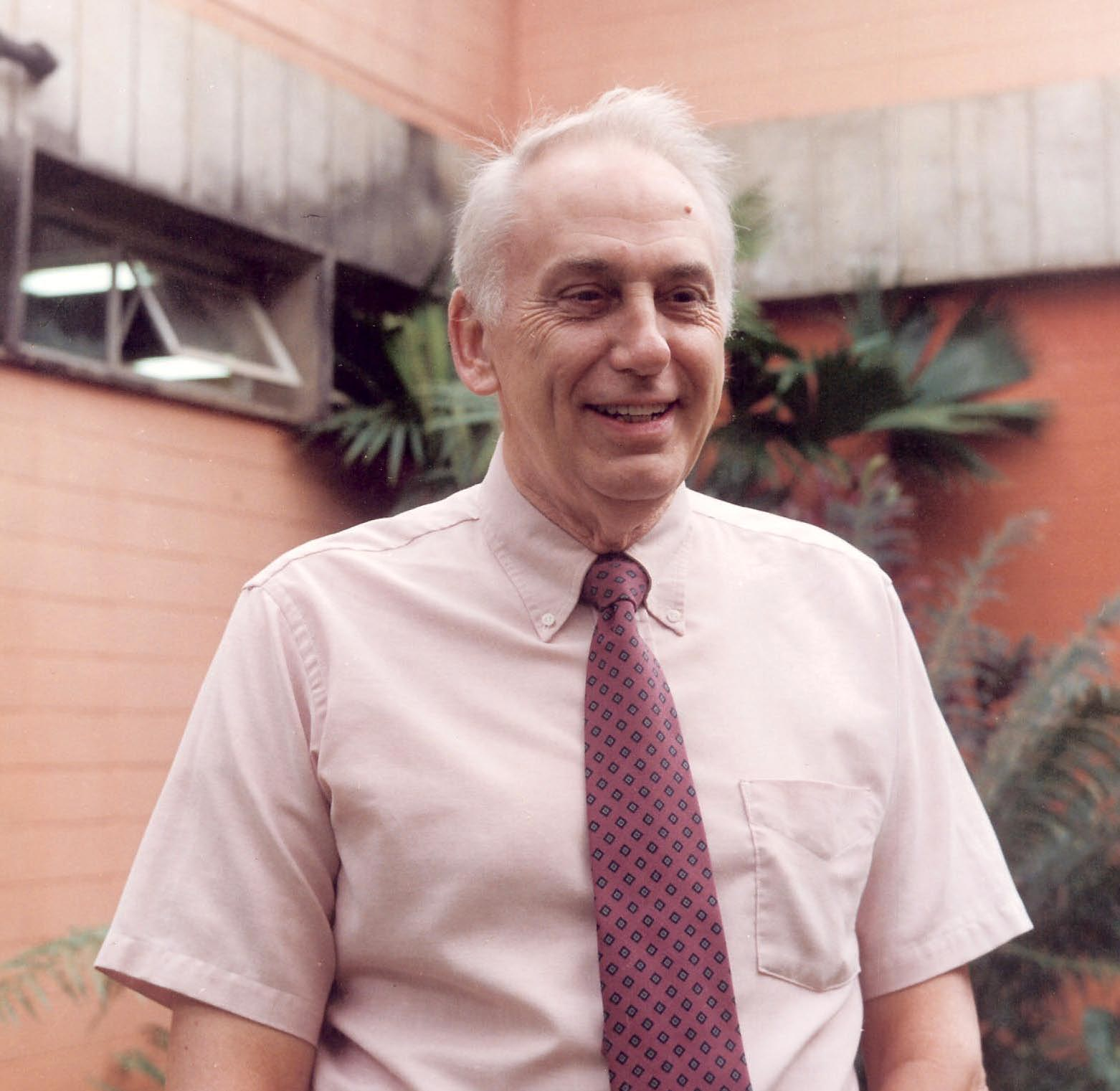
Jack K. Hale, mathematician in the field of dynamical systems

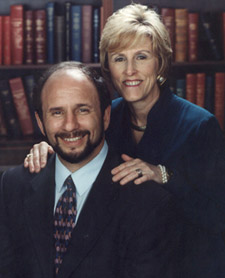
Sheila Ison Wellstone (right), politician and wife of U.S. senator Paul Wellstone

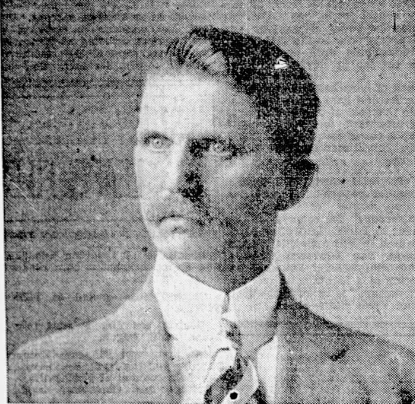
James P. Lewis, secretary of state of Kentucky from 1916 to 1920

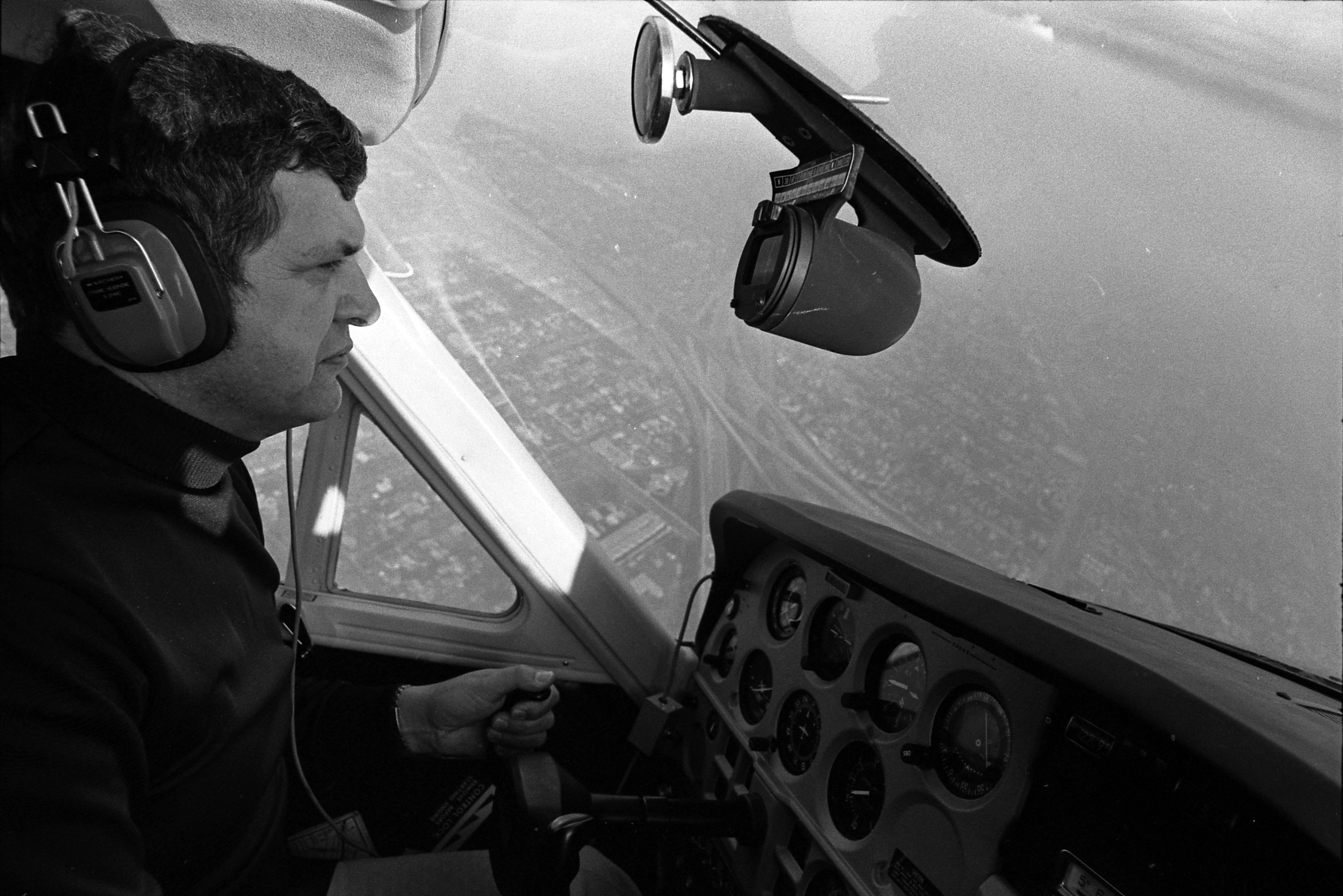
Francis Gary Powers, pilot whose plane was shot down over the Soviet Union, causing the 1960 U-2 incident

=== List ===
- Kenny Baker (June 26, 1926 – July 8, 2011) was an American fiddle player best known for his 25-year tenure with Bill Monroe and his group The Blue Grass Boys.
- Martha Carson (Country/gospel music singer, 1921–2004)
- Harry M. Caudill (1922–1990), author, historian, professor, lawyer, legislator, and environmentalist
- Jean Chapel (Country music singer, 1925–1995)
- Abraham Childers, (1750–1849), Continental Army solder and member of the Kentucky Senate from 1804 to 1806
- Raymond Collins (1911–1994), former member of the Kentucky House of Representatives
- Hoover Dawahare (November 2, 1928 – March 16, 2004), former member of the Kentucky House of Representatives
- Jessamyn Duke (mixed-martial artist, professional wrestler, born June 24, 1986)
- Emery L. Frazier (Mayor, state representative, Chief Clerk of the U.S. Senate, Secretary of the U.S. Senate, 1896–1973)
- Tom Gish, (1926–2008), publisher of the Mountain Eagle in Whitesburg, grew up in the county
- Jack K. Hale (1928–2009), mathematician
- Angie Hatton (born October 28, 1972), member of the Kentucky House of Representatives from 2017 to 2023.
- James P. Lewis (September 8, 1869 – May 22, 1942) former secretary of state of Kentucky from 1916 to 1920.
- Paul Mason (July 5, 1935 – December 7, 1998) was an American politician and activist who served in the Kentucky House of Representatives from the 91st district from 1987 until his death in 1998.
- Francis Gary Powers (August 17, 1929 – August 1, 1977) was an American pilot whose CIA U-2 spy plane was shot down while over the Soviet Union, causing the 1960 U-2 incident.
- Lee Sexton (Country, bluegrass, old-time musician, 1928–2021)
- Gary Stewart (Country music singer and musician, 1944–2003)
- Jim Webb (September 24, 1945 – October 22, 2018) was an Appalachian poet, playwright, and essayist.
- Sheila Wellstone (August 18, 1944 – October 25, 2002), politician and wife of U.S. senator from Minnesota Paul Wellstone.

== See also ==
- Caudill, Harry M., Author of Night Comes to the Cumberlands (1963). ISBN 0-316-13212-8
- National Register of Historic Places listings in Letcher County, Kentucky
