= National Register of Historic Places listings in Lee County, Virginia =

Location of Lee County in Virginia

This is a list of the National Register of Historic Places listings in Lee County, Virginia.

This is intended to be a complete list of the properties and districts on the National Register of Historic Places in Lee County, Virginia, United States. The locations of National Register properties and districts for which the latitude and longitude coordinates are included below, may be seen in an online map.

There are 10 properties and districts listed on the National Register in the county, including 1 National Historic Landmark.

This National Park Service list is complete through NPS recent listings posted September 25, 2026.

== Current listings ==
| | Name on the Register | Image | Date listed | Location | City or town | Description |
|---|---|---|---|---|---|---|
| 1 | Cumberland Gap Historic District | Cumberland Gap Historic District | May 28, 1980 (#80000366) | East of Middlesboro; 36°36′09″N 83°40′13″W | Gibson Station | Extends into Bell County, Kentucky and Claiborne County, Tennessee |
| 2 | Cumberland Gap National Historical Park | Cumberland Gap National Historical Park | October 15, 1966 (#66000353) | East of Middlesboro along the Kentucky-Virginia state line 36°36′36″N 83°39′00″W | Cumberland Gap | Extends into Bell County, Kentucky, Harlan County, Kentucky, and Claiborne County, Tennessee |
| 3 | Dickinson-Milbourn House | Dickinson-Milbourn House | August 12, 1993 (#93000825) | U.S. Route 58; 36°41′08″N 83°07′24″W | Jonesville | |
| 4 | Duff Mansion House | Duff Mansion House | June 12, 2019 (#100004096) | 4354 Kane Gap Rd. 36°44′27″N 82°51′18″W | Duffield | |
| 5 | Ely Mound | Ely Mound | July 28, 1983 (#83003287) | 2 miles (3.2 km) west of Rose Hill off U.S. Route 58; 36°39′22″N 83°24′08″W | Rose Hill | |
| 6 | Gibson Farm | | October 1, 2026 (#100013468) | 2473 Dr. Thomas Walker Road; 36°38′30″N 83°25′07″W | Ewing vicinity | |
| 7 | Jonesville Methodist Campground | Jonesville Methodist Campground | May 16, 1974 (#74002133) | West of Jonesville at the junction of U.S. Route 58 and Campground Rd. 36°40′57″N 83°08′38″W | Jonesville | |
| 8 | Keokee Store No. 1 | Keokee Store No. 1 | April 30, 2007 (#07000397) | Keokee Rd. 36°51′55″N 82°54′00″W | Keokee | |
| 9 | Pennington Gap Commercial Historic District | | May 6, 2024 (#100010000) | W. Morgan Avenue, E. Morgan Street, Magnolia Street, Main Street, N. Kentucky Street; 36°45′31″N 83°01′38″W | Pennington Gap | |
| 10 | William Sayers Homestead | William Sayers Homestead | February 17, 2015 (#15000017) | 110 Mabel Parkey Dr. 36°36′45″N 83°34′14″W | Ewing | |

== See also ==
- List of National Historic Landmarks in Virginia
- National Register of Historic Places listings in Virginia
