= Kesterson =

Kesterson may refer to:

- Kesterson National Wildlife Refuge, wetland environment in California
- Kesterson Reservoir, part of the San Luis National Wildlife Refuge in California
- Kesterson-Watkins House, farm house in Tazewell, Tennessee, US
- Lorna Kesterson (1925–2012), American journalist, newspaper editor and politician
