= Kincaid House =

Kincaid House may refer to:

in the United States (by state then city)

- Gray-Kincaid House, Crosby, Arkansas, listed on the National Register of Historic Places (NRHP)
- Hunt House (Griffin, Georgia), also known as the Chapman-Kincaid-Hunt House, NRHP-listed in Spalding County
- Decker-Kincaid Homestead, Boonton, New Jersey, listed on the National Register of Historic Places in Morris County, New Jersey
- Kincaid-Anderson House, Jenkinsville, South Carolina, NRHP-listed
- Kincaid-Howard House, Fincastle, Tennessee, NRHP-listed
- Kincaid House (Speedwell, Tennessee), listed on the National Register of Historic Places in Claiborne County, Tennessee
- Kincaid-Ausmus House, Speedwell, Tennessee, listed on the National Register of Historic Places in Claiborne County, Tennessee

in Scotland

- Kincaid House, historic seat of the Clan Kincaid, today a hotel in Milton of Campsie
