= Durnell =

Durnell may refer to:

- Charles Durnell, owner of Elwood, a Thoroughbred racehorse that won the 1904 Kentucky Derby
- John Durnell, an American farmer who was sued by Monsanto in Monsanto Co. v. Durnell
- Lisa Durnell, American politician elected in 2024
- Thomas Durnell (1901–1986), English cricketer
- Durnell, Missouri, United States, an unincorporated community

== See also ==
- Darnell, a given name and surname
- Darnell, Ohio, United States, an unincorporated community
- Darnell Town, Virginia, United States, an unincorporated community
- J. Michael Durnil (born 1961), American educator and former senior vice president and interim president of the Gay & Lesbian Alliance Against Defamation
