= Dartnell =

Dartnell is an Irish surname. Notable people with the surname include:

- John Dartnell (1838–1913), Commandant of the Natal Mounted Police
- Jorge Chavez Dartnell (1887–1910), Peruvian aviator
- Julie Dartnell (born 1963), Academy Award winning makeup artist
- Lewis Dartnell (born 1980), British author, presenter and professor of astrobiology
- Pedro Dartnell (1873–1944), Chilean military officer and member of the Government Junta of Chile in 1925
- Stephen Dartnell (1932–1989), British actor who appeared in several television programmes
- Wilbur Dartnell VC (1885–1915), Australian recipient of the Victoria Cross

== See also ==
- Darnell
