= National Register of Historic Places listings in Bell County, Kentucky =

Location of Bell County in Kentucky

This is a list of the National Register of Historic Places listings in Bell County, Kentucky.

It is intended to be a complete list of the properties on the National Register of Historic Places in Bell County, Kentucky, United States. The locations of National Register properties for which the latitude and longitude coordinates are included below, may be seen in a map.

There are 11 properties listed on the National Register in the county.

This National Park Service list is complete through NPS recent listings posted May 8, 2026.

== Current listings ==
	Name on the Register	Image	Date listed	Location	City or town	Description
1	American Association, Limited, Office Building	American Association, Limited, Office Building	December 29, 1978 (#78001299)	2215 Cumberland Ave. 36°36′24″N 83°43′05″W	Middlesboro	
2	Brooks House	Brooks House	December 23, 2009 (#09001137)	210 Arthur Heights; 36°36′35″N 83°43′01″W	Middlesboro	
3	Cary-Easton House		May 11, 2026 (#100012981)	208 Arthur Heights; 36°36′36″N 83°43′00″W	Middlesboro	
4	Cumberland Gap Historic District	Cumberland Gap Historic District	May 28, 1980 (#80000366)	East of Middlesboro; 36°36′14″N 83°40′28″W	Middlesboro	Extends into Claiborne County, Tennessee and Lee County, Virginia
5	Cumberland Gap National Historical Park	Cumberland Gap National Historical Park	October 15, 1966 (#66000353)	East of Middlesboro along Kentucky-Virginia state line 36°36′14″N 83°40′28″W	Middlesboro	Extends into Harlan County, Claiborne County, Tennessee and Lee County, Virginia
6	Hensley Settlement	Hensley Settlement	January 8, 1980 (#80000367)	Cumberland Gap National Historical Park; 36°40′10″N 83°31′42″W	Cubage	
7	Middlesboro Downtown Commercial District	Middlesboro Downtown Commercial District	January 10, 1983 (#83002554)	Roughly bounded by Cumberland Ave., 19th, 20th Sts., and Edgewood Rd. 36°36′30″N 83°42′50″W	Middlesboro	
8	Middlesboro Jewish Cemetery		August 2, 2017 (#100001419)	100 Hebrew Cemetery Rd. 36°35′55″N 83°43′14″W	Middlesboro	
9	Mt. Moriah Baptist Church	Mt. Moriah Baptist Church	August 8, 1985 (#85001747)	314 N. Main St. 36°36′38″N 83°42′46″W	Middlesboro	
10	Pineville Courthouse Square Historic District	Pineville Courthouse Square Historic District	July 19, 1990 (#90001019)	Along Kentucky, Pine, Virginia, and Walnut Sts. 36°45′41″N 83°41′44″W	Pineville	Includes the Bell County Courthouse and several commercial buildings
11	St. Mary's Episcopal Church	St. Mary's Episcopal Church	November 15, 1984 (#84000341)	131 Edgewood Rd. 36°36′32″N 83°43′00″W	Middlesboro	

== See also ==
- List of National Historic Landmarks in Kentucky
- National Register of Historic Places listings in Kentucky
