= Powell Valley Male Academy =

- U.S. National Register of Historic Places
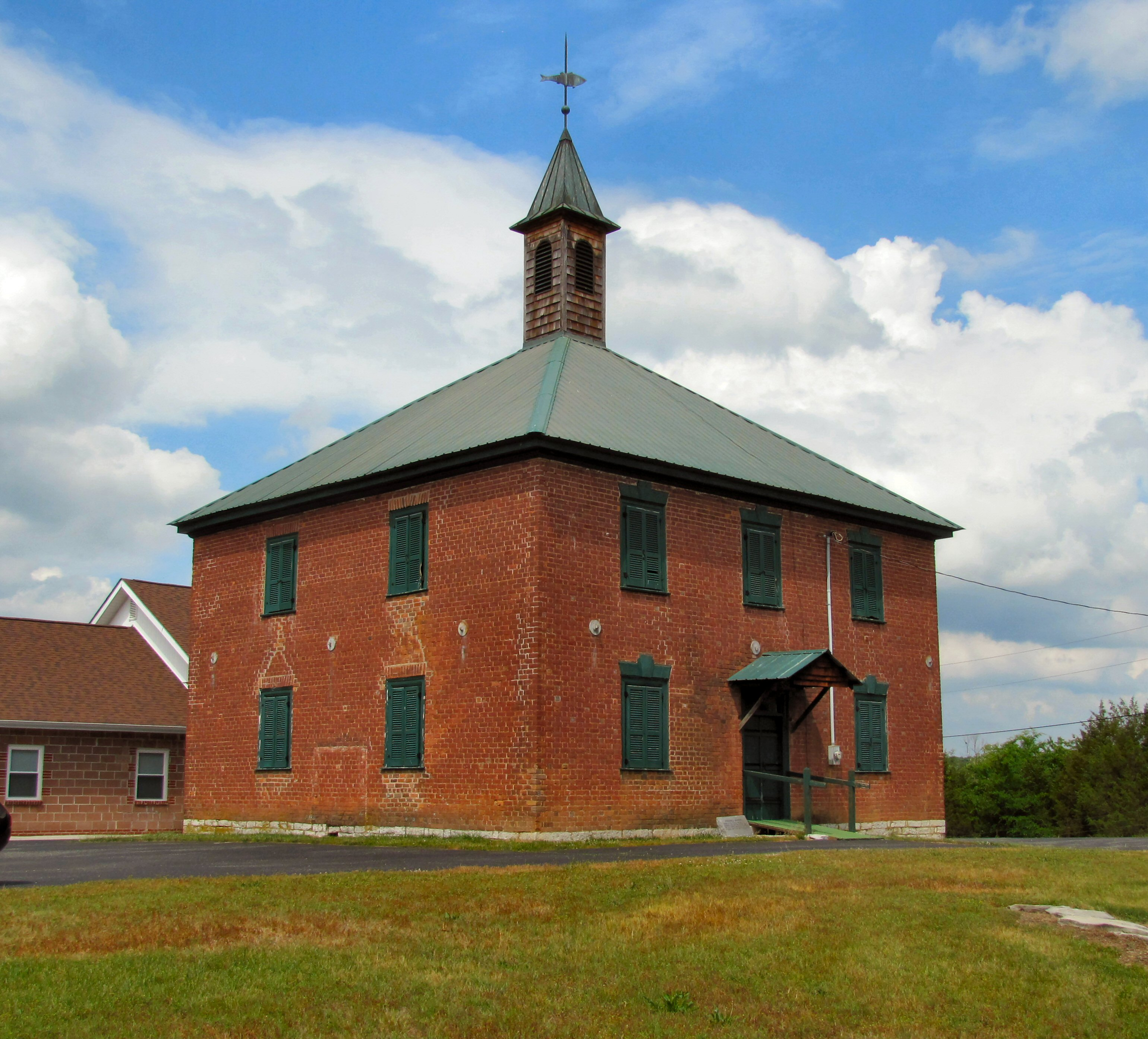
- The building in 2015

- Location within Tennessee
- Location: Junction of Old TN 63 and Academy Road, Speedwell, Tennessee
- Coordinates: 36°26′40″N 83°55′04″W
- Area: 1 acre (0.40 ha)
- Built: 1827
- Architectural style: Greek Revival Influence
- NRHP reference No.: 95000053
- Added to NRHP: February 16, 1995

The Powell Valley Male Academy, also known as the Speedwell Academy, is a historic building in Speedwell, Tennessee. It was built in 1827 by slaves owned by George Shutter, an immigrant from Germany who founded the school. During the American Civil War of 1861–1865, it was used as headquarters for the Confederate States Army by Brigadier General Felix Zollicoffer. According to Kimberley Murphy of the East Tennessee Development District, "Speedwell Academy continue[d] to serve as the social heart of the Speedwell community" in the mid-1990s. The building has been listed on the National Register of Historic Places since February 16, 1995.
