= McClain-Ellison House =

- U.S. National Register of Historic Places
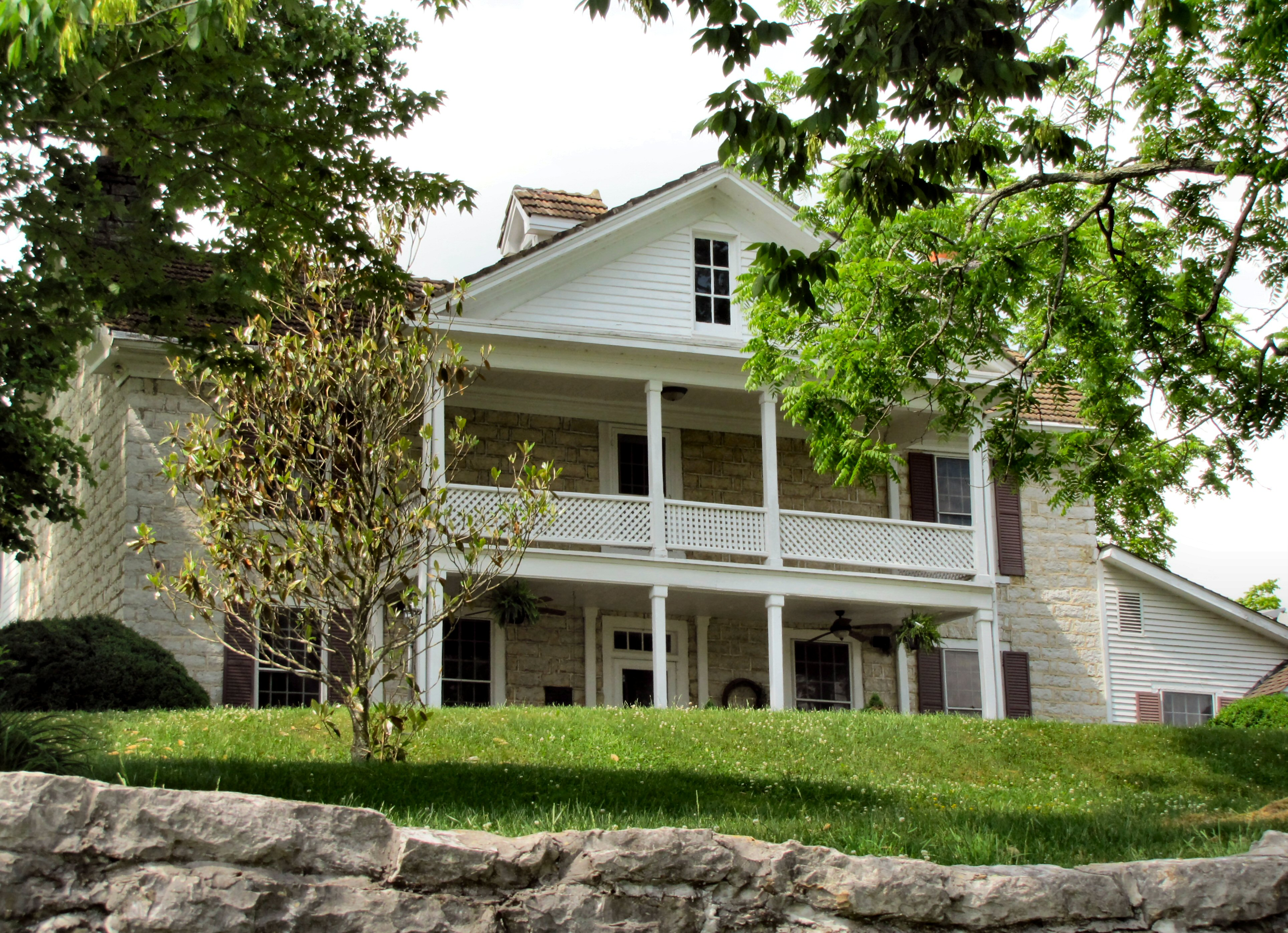
- The house in 2015

- Location within Tennessee
- Nearest city: Speedwell, Tennessee
- Coordinates: 36°27′18″N 83°55′40″W
- Area: 9 acres (3.6 ha)
- Built: 1793
- Built by: Thomas McClain
- Architectural style: Federal
- NRHP reference No.: 75001738
- Added to NRHP: June 10, 1975

The McClain-Ellison House is a historic house in Speedwell, Tennessee. It was built in 1793 by Thomas McClain, a settler who lived in a cave before building the house, and it was designed in the Federal architectural style. McClain lived here with a large family, including his 14 children from two wives. The house was purchased by Doc Rogers in 1875, followed by Marshall Ellison in 1900. It was inherited by his daughter, Myrtle Ellison Smith, who authored The Civil War Cookbook. Her husband, E. H. Smith, a playwright. The house has been listed on the National Register of Historic Places since June 10, 1975.

The property includes a historic log smokehouse which was partially rebuilt in 1970, by the replacement of two deteriorated chestnut logs by new oak ones.
