= National Register of Historic Places listings in Claiborne County, Tennessee =

Location of Claiborne County in Tennessee

This is a list of the National Register of Historic Places listings in Claiborne County, Tennessee.

This is intended to be a complete list of the properties and districts on the National Register of Historic Places in Claiborne County, Tennessee, United States. Latitude and longitude coordinates are provided for many National Register properties and districts; these locations may be seen together in a map.

There are 15 properties and districts in the county are listed on the National Register. Another two properties were once listed but have been removed.

Contents: Counties in Tennessee
Anderson – Bedford – Benton – Bledsoe – Blount – Bradley – Campbell – Cannon – Carroll – Carter – Cheatham – Chester – Claiborne – Clay – Cocke – Coffee – Crockett – Cumberland – Davidson – Decatur – DeKalb – Dickson – Dyer – Fayette – Fentress – Franklin – Gibson – Giles – Grainger – Greene – Grundy – Hamblen – Hamilton – Hancock – Hardeman – Hardin – Hawkins – Haywood – Henderson – Henry – Hickman – Houston – Humphreys – Jackson – Jefferson – Johnson – Knox – Lake – Lauderdale – Lawrence – Lewis – Lincoln – Loudon – Macon – Madison – Marion – Marshall – Maury – McMinn – McNairy – Meigs – Monroe – Montgomery – Moore – Morgan – Obion – Overton – Perry – Pickett – Polk – Putnam – Rhea – Roane – Robertson – Rutherford – Scott – Sequatchie – Sevier – Shelby – Smith – Stewart – Sullivan – Sumner – Tipton – Trousdale – Unicoi – Union – Van Buren – Warren – Washington – Wayne – Weakley – White – Williamson – Wilson

This National Park Service list is complete through NPS recent listings posted November 6, 2026.

== Current listings ==
	Name on the Register	Image	Date listed	Location	City or town	Description
1	Big Spring Union Church	Big Spring Union Church	May 29, 1975 (#75001739)	Off State Route 32; 36°25′20″N 83°31′28″W	Springdale	Also known as the Big Springs Primitive Baptist Church
2	Claiborne County Courthouse	Claiborne County Courthouse	November 12, 2026 (#100013596)	1740 Main Street; 36°27′15″N 83°34′09″W	Tazewell	
3	Claiborne County Jail	Claiborne County Jail	March 21, 2007 (#07000175)	State Route 33 at U.S. Route 25E; 36°27′09″N 83°34′08″W	Tazewell	
4	Cumberland Gap Historic District	Cumberland Gap Historic District	February 23, 1990 (#90000321)	Roughly bounded by Colwyn, Cumberland, Pennlyn, and the former L&N railroad tracks 36°36′00″N 83°40′08″W	Cumberland Gap	In the town of Cumberland Gap
5	Cumberland Gap Historic District	Cumberland Gap Historic District	May 28, 1980 (#80000366)	East of Middlesboro, Kentucky; 36°36′14″N 83°40′28″W	Harrogate	Cumberland Gap, the pass that was used by the Wilderness Road, located within Cumberland Gap National Historical Park. Extends into Bell County, Kentucky, Harlan County, Kentucky, and Lee County, Virginia
6	Cumberland Gap National Historical Park	Cumberland Gap National Historical Park	October 15, 1966 (#66000353)	East of Middlesboro, Kentucky, along the Kentucky-Virginia state line 36°36′14″N 83°40′28″W	Cumberland Gap	Extends into Bell County, Kentucky and Lee County, Virginia
7	Graham-Kivett House	Graham-Kivett House	May 29, 1975 (#75001740)	Junction of Main St. and Old Knoxville Rd. 36°27′07″N 83°34′12″W	Tazewell	Built circa 1810 by William Graham; later occupied by the Kivett family.
8	Grant-Lee Hall	Grant-Lee Hall	December 8, 1978 (#78002575)	Lincoln Memorial University campus 36°34′52″N 83°39′33″W	Harrogate	
9	Johnson's Mill		March 23, 2026 (#100012853)	4084 TN-33 South; 36°23′32″N 83°42′06″W	New Tazewell vicinity	
10	Kesterson-Watkins House	Kesterson-Watkins House	April 26, 1982 (#82003958)	Cedar Fork Rd. 36°29′36″N 83°29′38″W	Tazewell	
11	Kincaid House	Kincaid House	March 22, 1982 (#82003957)	Northeast of Speedwell on Russell Lane; 36°28′05″N 83°49′22″W	Speedwell	Also called the Kincaid-Russell House; built c. 1840 by John Kincaid II for his brother, William H. Kincaid; Nomination form: https://npgallery.nps.gov/NRHP/GetAsset/NRHP/82003957_text
12	Kincaid-Ausmus House	Kincaid-Ausmus House	June 18, 1975 (#75001737)	Northeast of Speedwell off State Route 63; 36°29′44″N 83°48′15″W	Speedwell	Built in 1851 by John Kincaid II for his son, John Kincaid III; Nomination form: https://npgallery.nps.gov/NRHP/GetAsset/NRHP/75001737_text
13	McClain-Ellison House	McClain-Ellison House	June 10, 1975 (#75001738)	West of Speedwell on Route 2 off State Route 63; 36°27′18″N 83°55′40″W	Speedwell	Built in the 1790s by Thomas McClain; occupied by the Ellison family during the 20th century; Nomination form: https://npgallery.nps.gov/NRHP/GetAsset/NRHP/75001738_text
14	Methodist Episcopal Church South at Tazewell		July 16, 2026 (#100013209)	1702 Main Street; 36°27′10″N 83°34′13″W	Tazewell	
15	Powell Valley Male Academy	Powell Valley Male Academy	February 16, 1995 (#95000053)	Junction of Old State Route 63 and Academy Rd. 36°26′40″N 83°55′04″W	Speedwell	Also known as Speedwell Academy. Built in 1827.

== Former listing ==
	Name on the Register	Image	Date listed	Date removed	Location	City or town	Description
1	Parkey House		February 1, 1972 (#72001231)	December 28, 1978	Main St.	Tazewell	
2	James Weir House	James Weir House	April 18, 1979 (#79002419)	April 2, 2021	Eppes St. 36°27′12″N 83°34′14″W	Tazewell	Moved south of Tazewell

== See also ==
- List of National Historic Landmarks in Tennessee
- National Register of Historic Places listings in Tennessee
