= Graham-Kivett House =

- Graham-Kivette House
- U.S. National Register of Historic Places
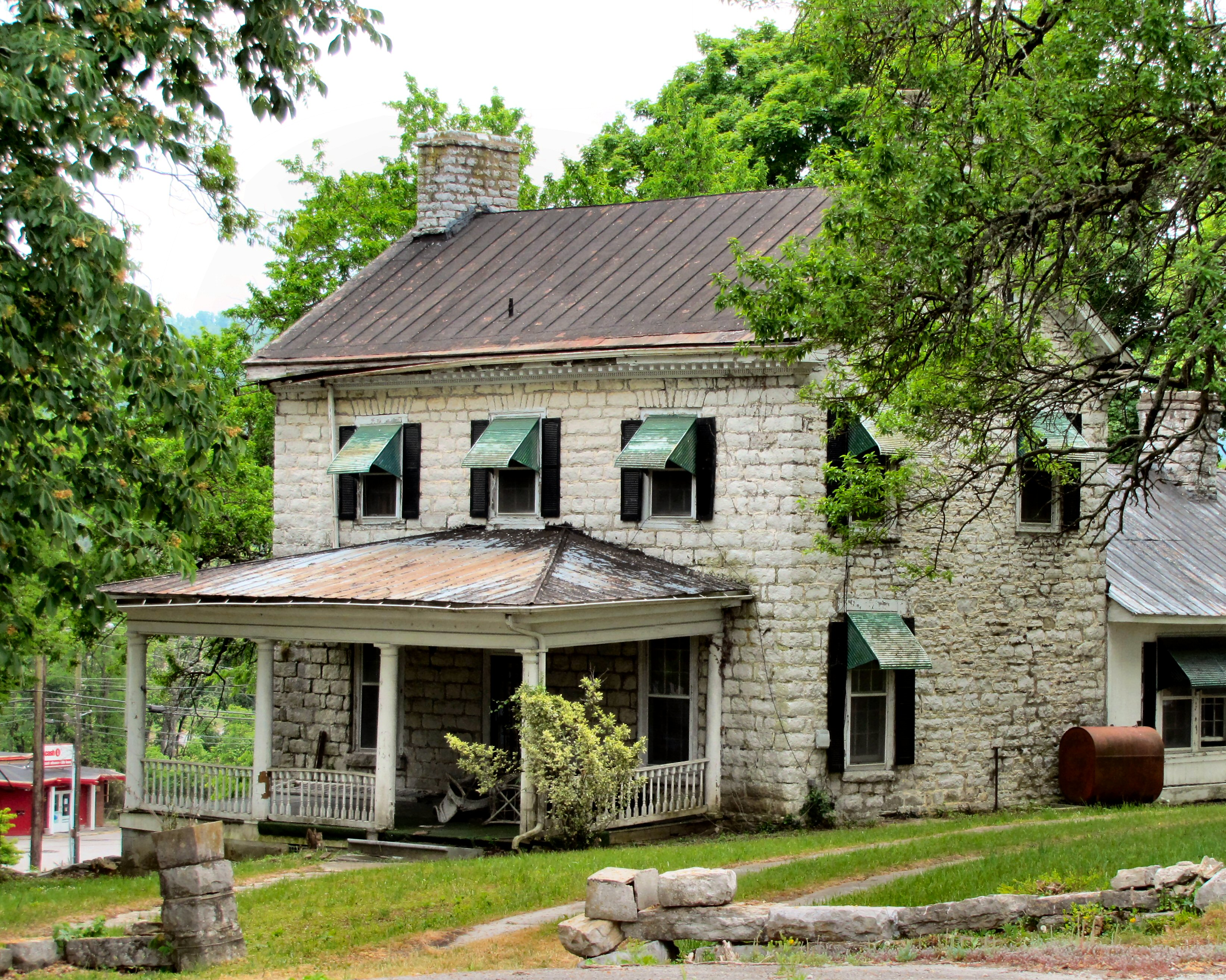
- The house in 2015

- Location within Tennessee
- Location: Main Street and Old Knoxville Road, Tazewell, Tennessee
- Coordinates: 36°27′08″N 83°34′17″W
- Area: 1 acre (0.40 ha)
- Built: c.1800
- Built by: William Graham
- Architectural style: Federal
- NRHP reference No.: 75001740
- Added to NRHP: May 29, 1975

The Graham-Kivett House is a historic house in Tazewell, Tennessee. It was built of limestone around 1800 by William Graham, an immigrant from Ireland who co-founded of Tazewell. The house was designed in the Federal architectural style. By the turn of the 20th century, it belonged to William Yoakum, who sold it to James Kivett, a lawyer. It was inherited by his son, J. K. Kivett, who served as the county judge of Claiborne County until he was "convicted in December 1956 of taking four $1,000 county bonds to a Knoxville bank in June 1954 to obtain a personal loan of $5,400." The house remained in the Kivett family in the 1970s. It has been listed on the National Register of Historic Places since May 29, 1975.
