= Westlands Solar Park =

Solar farm in Kings County, California

- Country: United States
- Location: Kings County, California
- Coordinates: 36°10′N 119°56′W
- Status: Operational
- Commission date: June 2016

Solar farm
- Type: Flat-panel PV
- Site area: 21,000 acres (8,500 ha)

Power generation
- Nameplate capacity: 672 MW

External links
- Website: www.westlandssolarpark.com

The Westlands Solar Park is large-scale solar power project in Kings County south of Fresno, California. It intends to build many photovoltaic power plants with a capacity totaling upwards of 2,000 megawatts (MW), larger than the world's largest photovoltaic power plants operating as of 2017. It will be constructed on brownfield land owned by the Westlands Water District that is unusable for agriculture due to excess salt pollution.

== History ==
Initial operation of a 2 MW demonstration project began in 2016, with the power sold to Anaheim Public Utilities. Additional projects of 20 MW and 250 MW are in various stages of planning, as of 2017. The developers planned to have 700 MW online by 2021, with full build-out by 2025. The real estate investment firm CIM Group joined the project in 2014. In 2017, plans for the site were downsized from 2,400 MW to 2,000 MW and 24,000 acres (9,700 ha) to 21,000 acres (8,500 ha). Construction began in 2020.

The first 125 MW phase of the Aquamarine project opened in September 2021, with the second 125 MW opening by the end of the year.

The 250 MW Westlands Solar Blue also has 225.0 MW of batteries. Chestnut has 135 MW of batteries. The 19.9 MW_{AC} (26 MW_{DC}) Westlands Almond is part of a agrivoltaics scheme, using sheep for vegetation control. Westlands Grape and Cherry are expected to be completed in December 2024.

RE Slate, Mustang One and Two, RE Kent South, and American Kings Solar are solar plants which border Westlands Solar Park to the northeast with a combined total of 441 MW of capacity.

== Phases ==
Project	Capacity	Status	Commission Date	Power purchase agreements	References
Westside Solar WSP PV1	2 MW	Operational	August 12, 2016	Anaheim Public Utilities	
Westlands Almond	20 MW	Operational	October 2023	CISO	
Aquamarine Westside	250 MW	Operational	September 2021, February 2022	SMUD, SVP, VCEA	
Chestnut Westside	150 MW	Operational	December 2023		
Westlands Solar Blue	250 MW	Operational	December 2023		
Westlands Grape	246.4 MW	In Development			
Westlands Cherry	249.7 MW	In Development			
Westlands Pomegranate	250 MW	Proposed			

== Electricity production ==
It produced 4,739 MWh in 2020.

== See also ==
- List of largest power stations in the United States
- List of photovoltaic power stations
- Solar power in California
