= Rawhide, Virginia =

Unincorporated community in Virginia, United States

- Unincorporated community
- Location within Virginia Location within the United States
- Coordinates: 36°51′20″N 82°54′40″W
- Country: United States
- State: Virginia
- County: Lee
- Elevation: 2,064 ft (629 m)
- Time zone: UTC-5 (Eastern (EST))
  - Summer (DST): UTC-4 (EDT)
- GNIS feature ID: 1496130

Rawhide is an unincorporated community in Lee County, Virginia, United States. It is part of the Keokee census-designated place.

Rawhide was named by the family who owned the company store.
