= William Sayers Homestead =

Historic house in Virginia, United States

- U.S. National Register of Historic Places
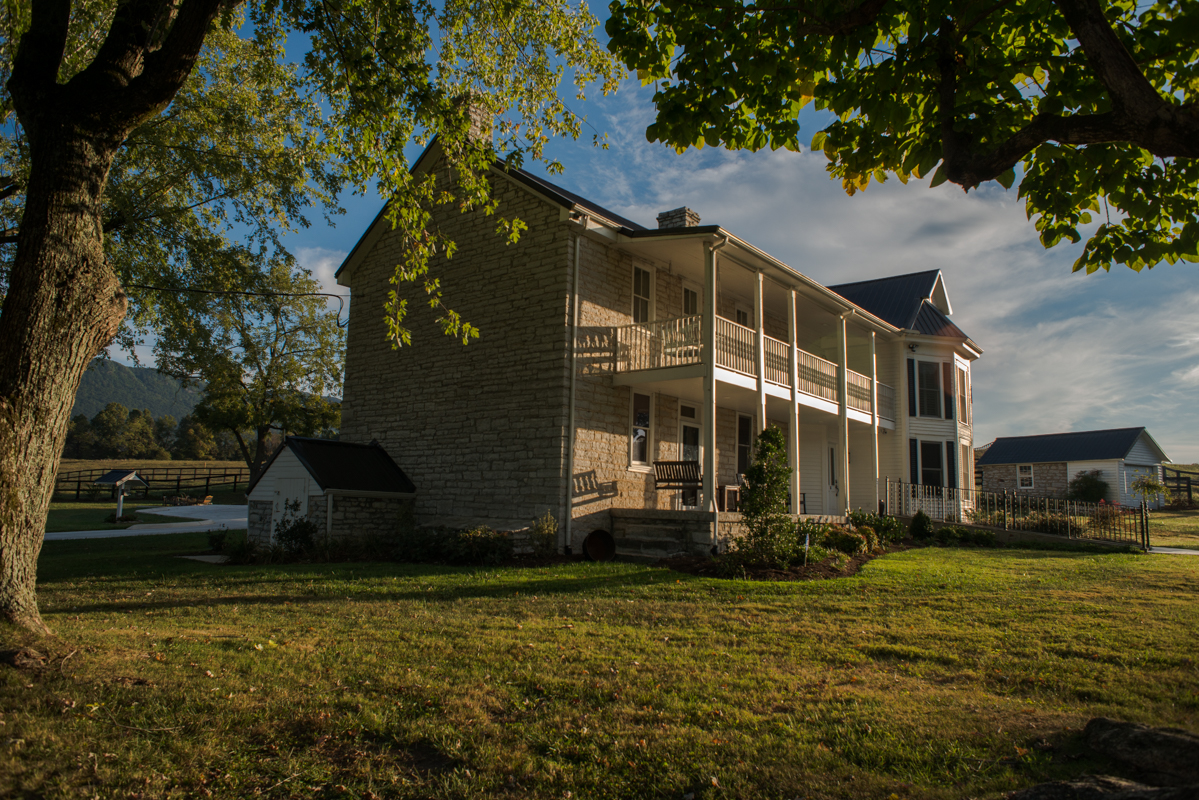

- Location within Virginia Location within the United States
- Location: 110 Mabel Parkey Dr., Ewing, Virginia
- Coordinates: 36°36′45″N 83°34′14″W
- Area: 7 acres (2.8 ha)
- Built: c. 1796
- Architectural style: Late Georgian; Late Victorian
- NRHP reference No.: 15000017
- Added to NRHP: February 17, 2015

The William Sayers Homestead is a historic farmstead property at 110 Mabel Parkey Drive, near Ewing in Lee County, Virginia. The centerpiece of the farmstead is a two-story stone house, around 1796 by William Sayers, along the historic Wilderness Road and near the Cumberland Gap, to which a two-story front porch and two-story frame addition was made in the 1890s. The main house exhibits high quality late Georgian styling, while the addition has Late Victorian massing, with projecting bay windows. The property also includes a barn, utility building, garage, corn crib, and chicken house, all of mid-20th-century construction. William Sayers, the house's original builder, was a surveyor from Wythe County.

The property was listed on the National Register of Historic Places in 2015.
