= Kincaid-Ausmus House =

Historic house in Tennessee, United States

- U.S. National Register of Historic Places
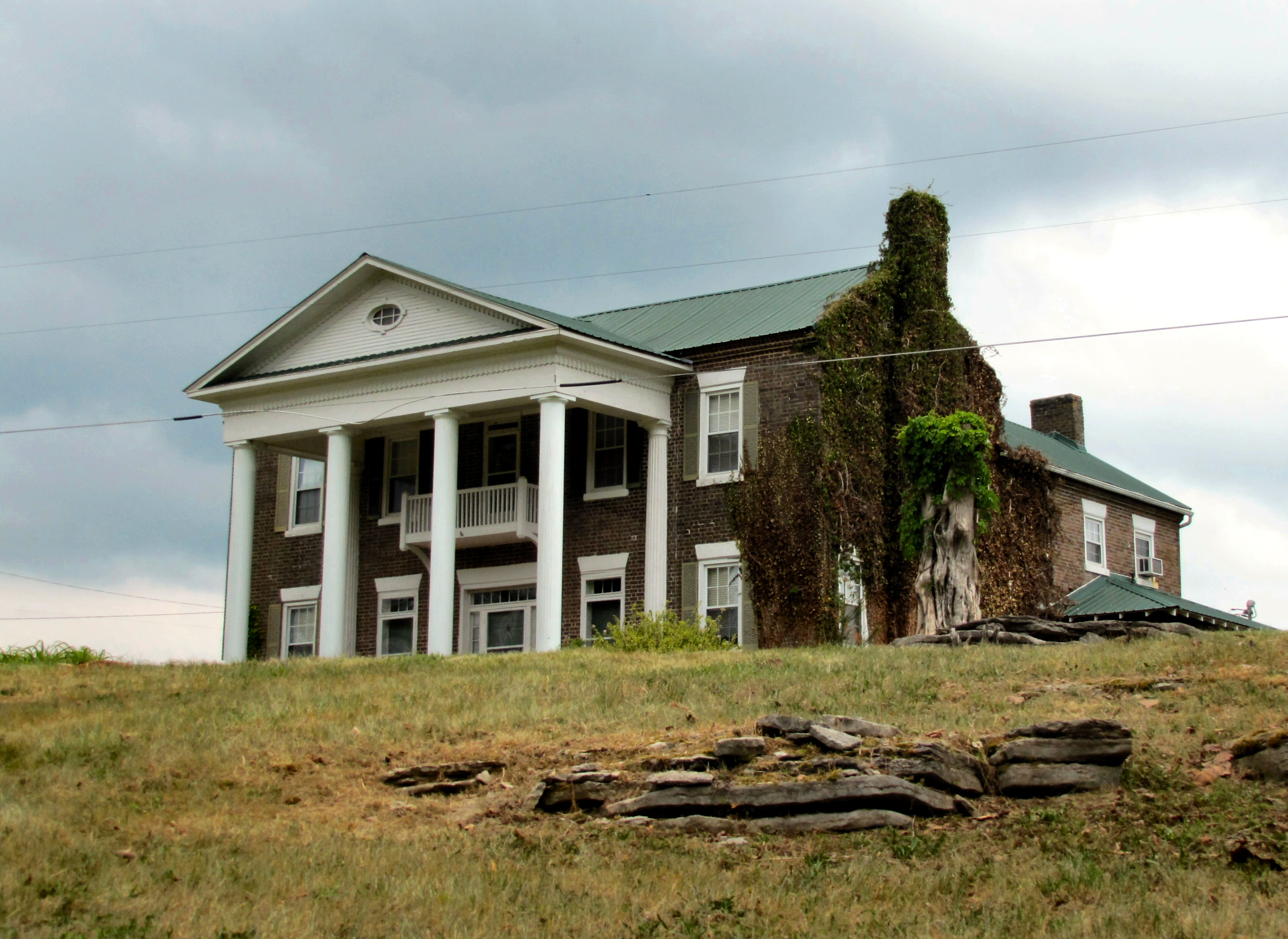

- Location within Tennessee Location within the United States
- Nearest city: Speedwell, Tennessee
- Coordinates: 36°29′44″N 83°48′15″W
- Area: 9 acres (3.6 ha)
- Built: 1851
- Architectural style: Federal
- NRHP reference No.: 75001737
- Added to NRHP: June 18, 1975

The Kincaid-Ausmus House is a historic mansion in Speedwell, Tennessee, U.S..

== History ==
The house was built in 1851 for John Kincaid III. The Kincaids owned slaves, and the house was built with slave labor. During the American Civil War of 1861–1865, John Kincaid III served as a captain in the Confederate States Army; he later fled to St. Louis, Missouri.

The house was later acquired by Jordan Longmire, and became known as Longmire Place. Subsequent owners included William Ausmus and his son Frank, followed by the Welch family.

== Architectural significance ==
The house was designed in the Federal architectural style. It has been listed on the National Register of Historic Places since June 18, 1975.
