= San Luis National Wildlife Refuge =

Wildlife refuge in Merced County, California

- IUCN category IV (habitat/species management area)
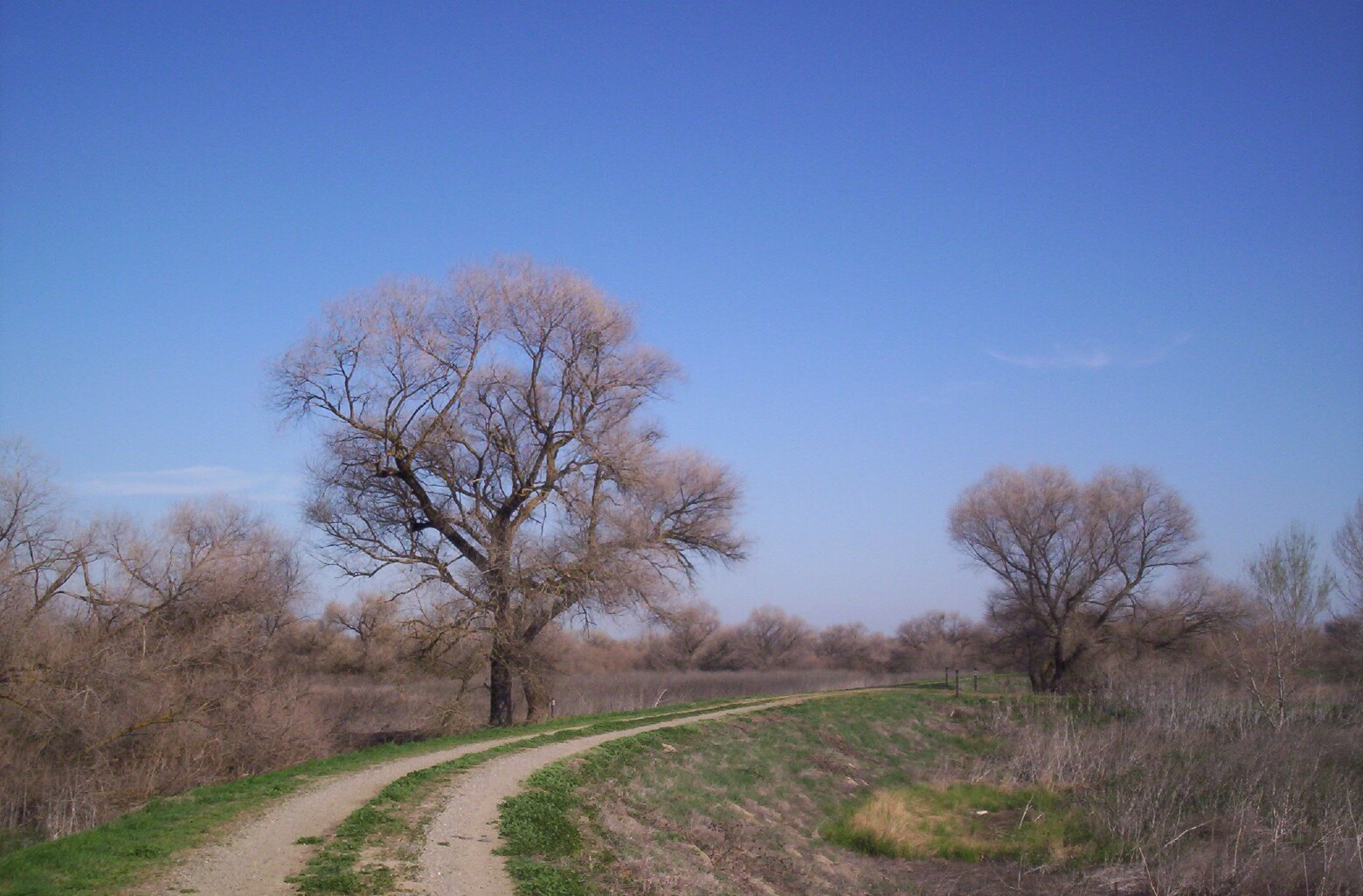
- North levee, San Luis Refuge - March, 2007

- Location within the United States
- Location: Merced County, California, United States
- Nearest city: Los Banos, California
- Coordinates: 37°12′00″N 120°48′04″W
- Area: 26,600 acres (108 km^{2})
- Established: 1966
- Governing body: U.S. Fish and Wildlife Service
- Website: San Luis National Wildlife Refuge

The San Luis National Wildlife Refuge in the San Joaquin Valley of Central California is one of the remnants of wintering grounds for migratory waterfowl on the Pacific Flyway. Located in the Bear Creek, Salt Slough, and San Joaquin River floodplain, it hosts a myriad of tree-lined channels and oxbows, wetlands and native grasslands.

Thousands of acres of wetlands, fed by an intricate set of canals, are managed to produce natural food supplies for migratory waterfowl. San Luis also contains the most extensive network of native grasslands, shrubs, and vernal pools that still remain within the Central Valley.

Thousands upon thousands of mallard, pintail, green-winged teal, and ring-necked ducks flock into the managed wetlands; while the wood duck lives throughout the tree-lined slough channels.

Herons and egrets nest in mature oaks and willows and feed on the refuge's abundant frog and crayfish populations. A wide diversity of songbirds, hawks, and owls also use refuge habitat.

Hunting is allowed in the winter season on a portion of the refuge, which also holds a herd of reintroduced endangered tule elk, the smallest subspecies of all American elks.

== Photos ==
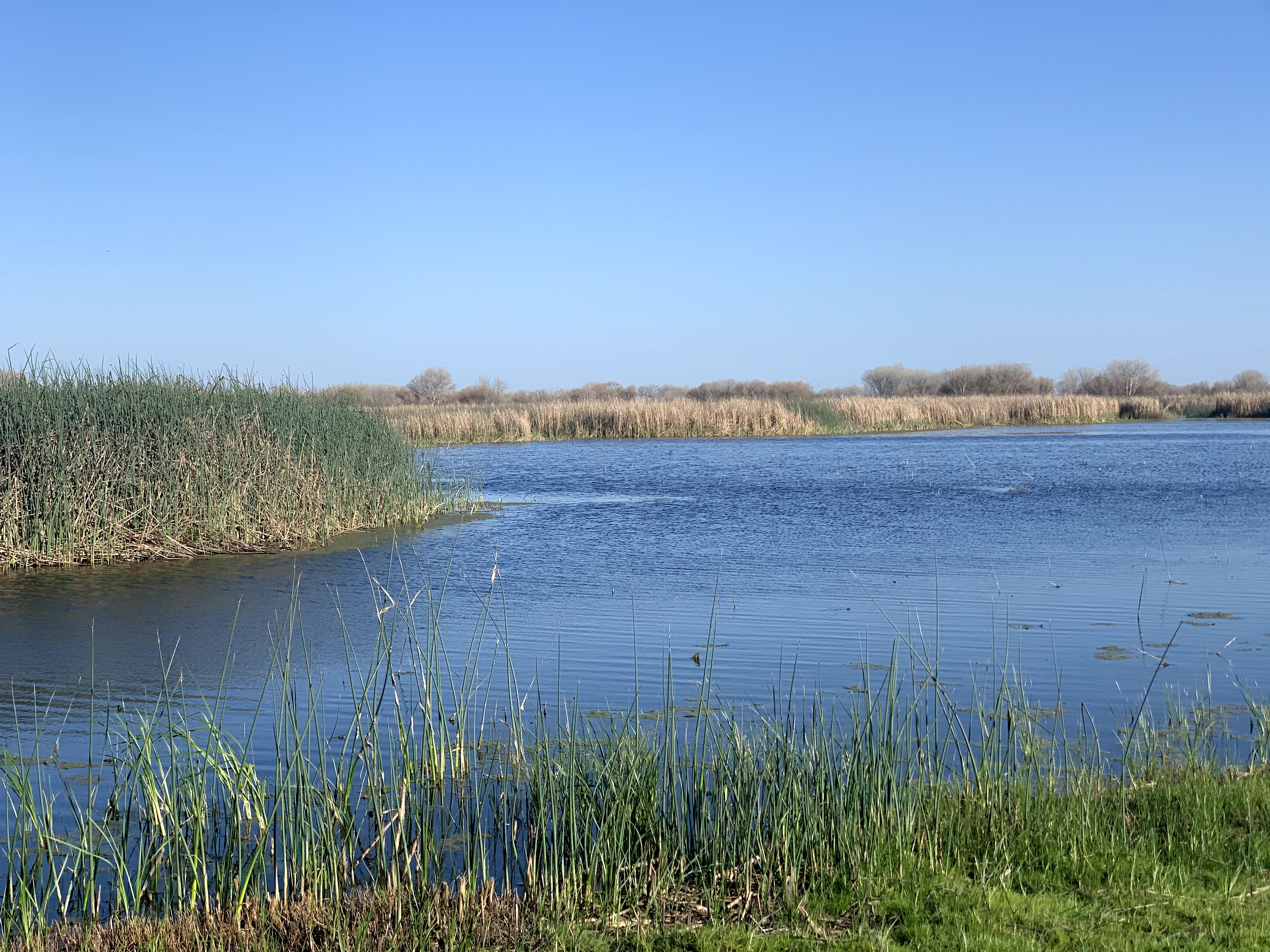
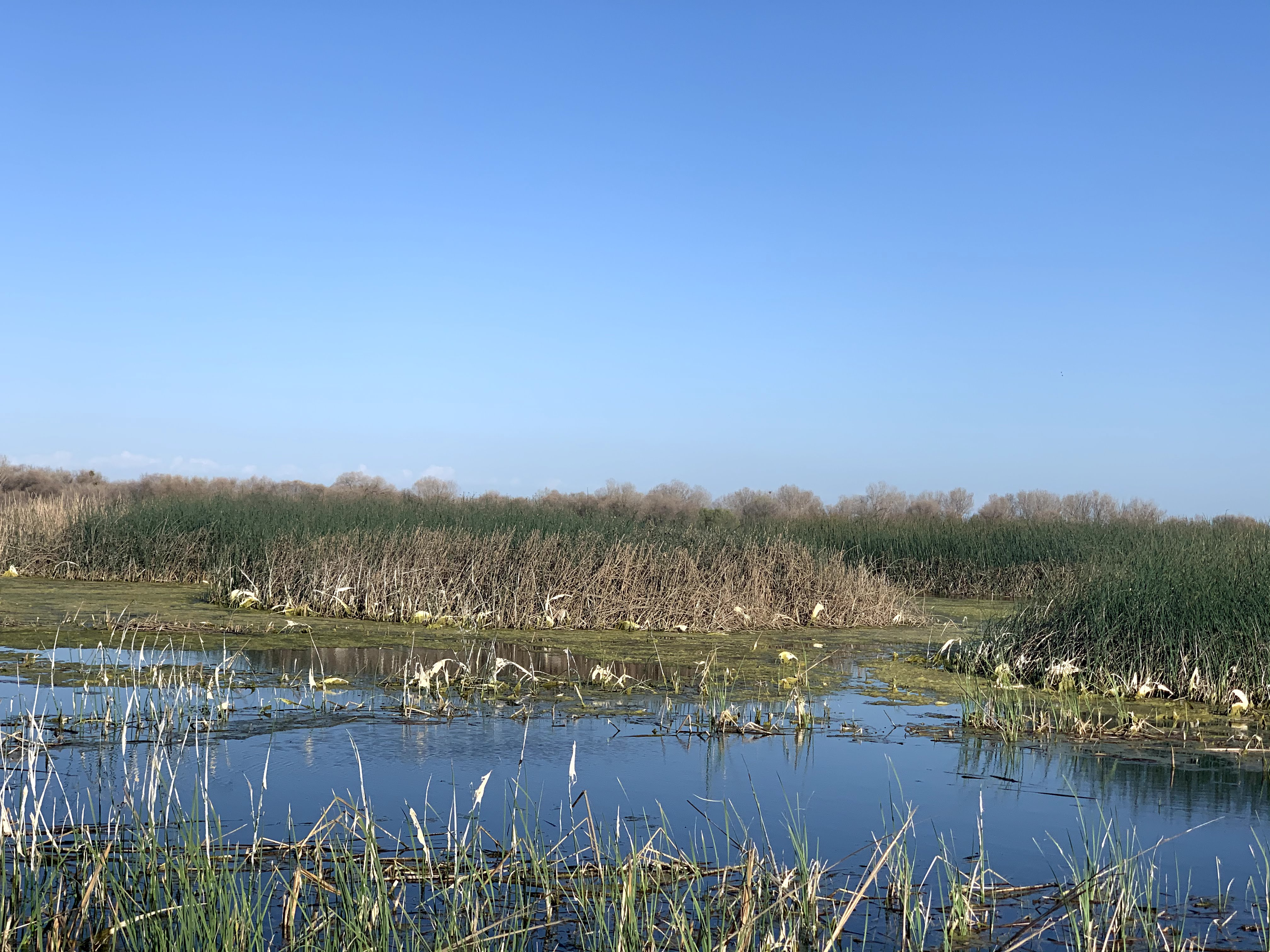
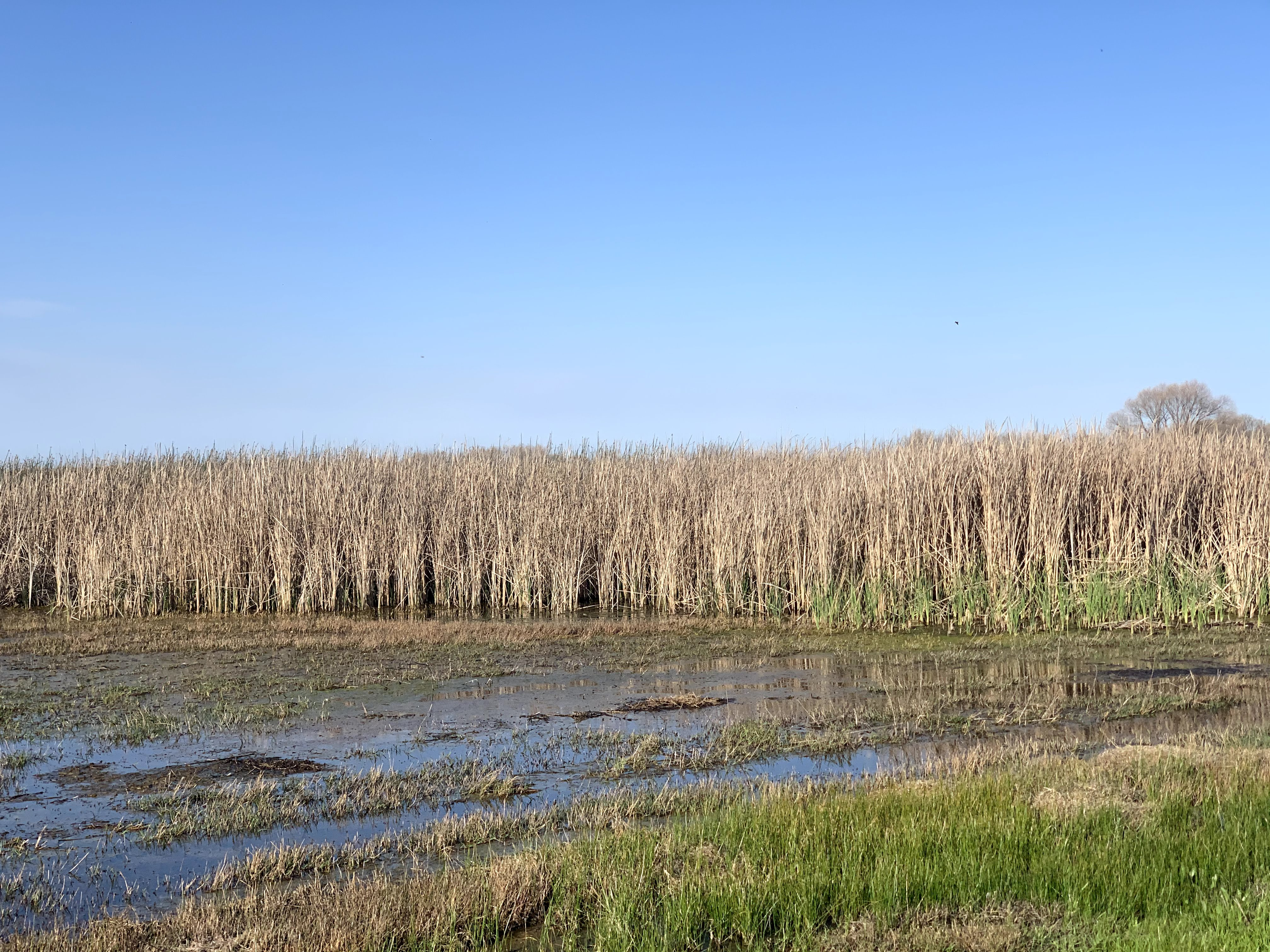
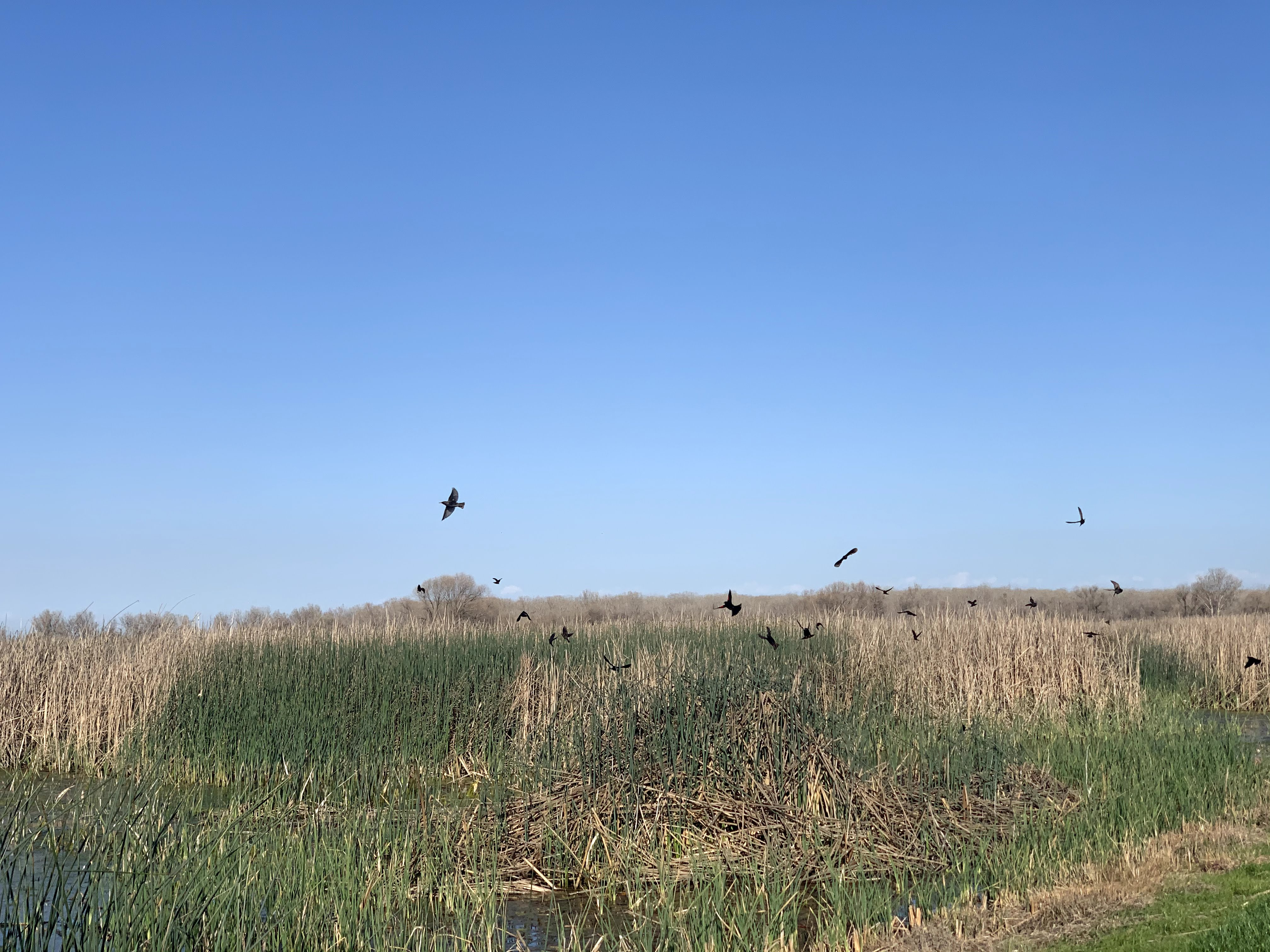
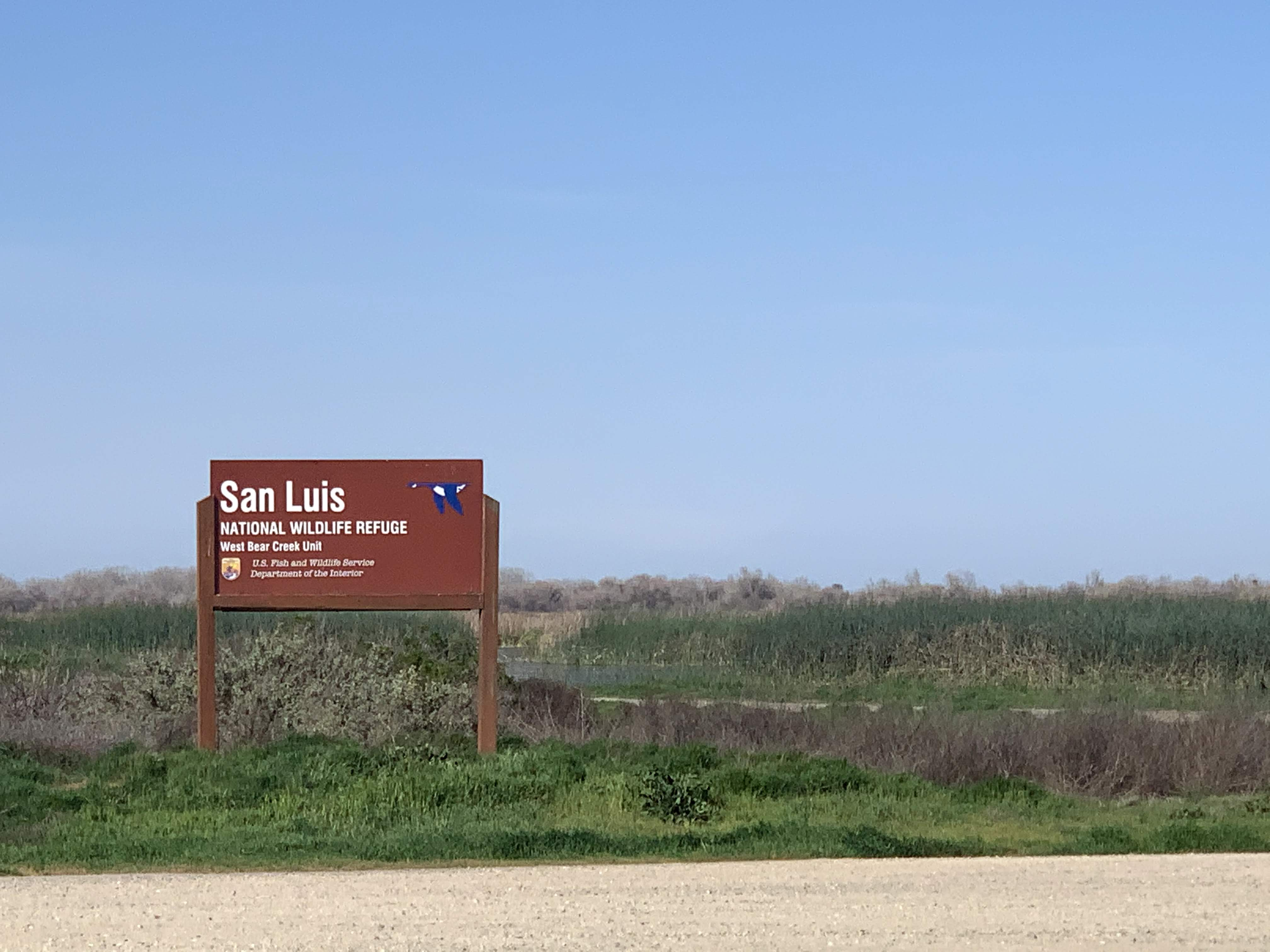

== See also ==
- Kesterson National Wildlife Refuge, a former refuge now closed due to pollution
- Kesterson Reservoir, now located within San Luis National Wildlife Refuge
