= Kincaid House (Speedwell, Tennessee) =

Historic house in Tennessee, United States

- U.S. National Register of Historic Places
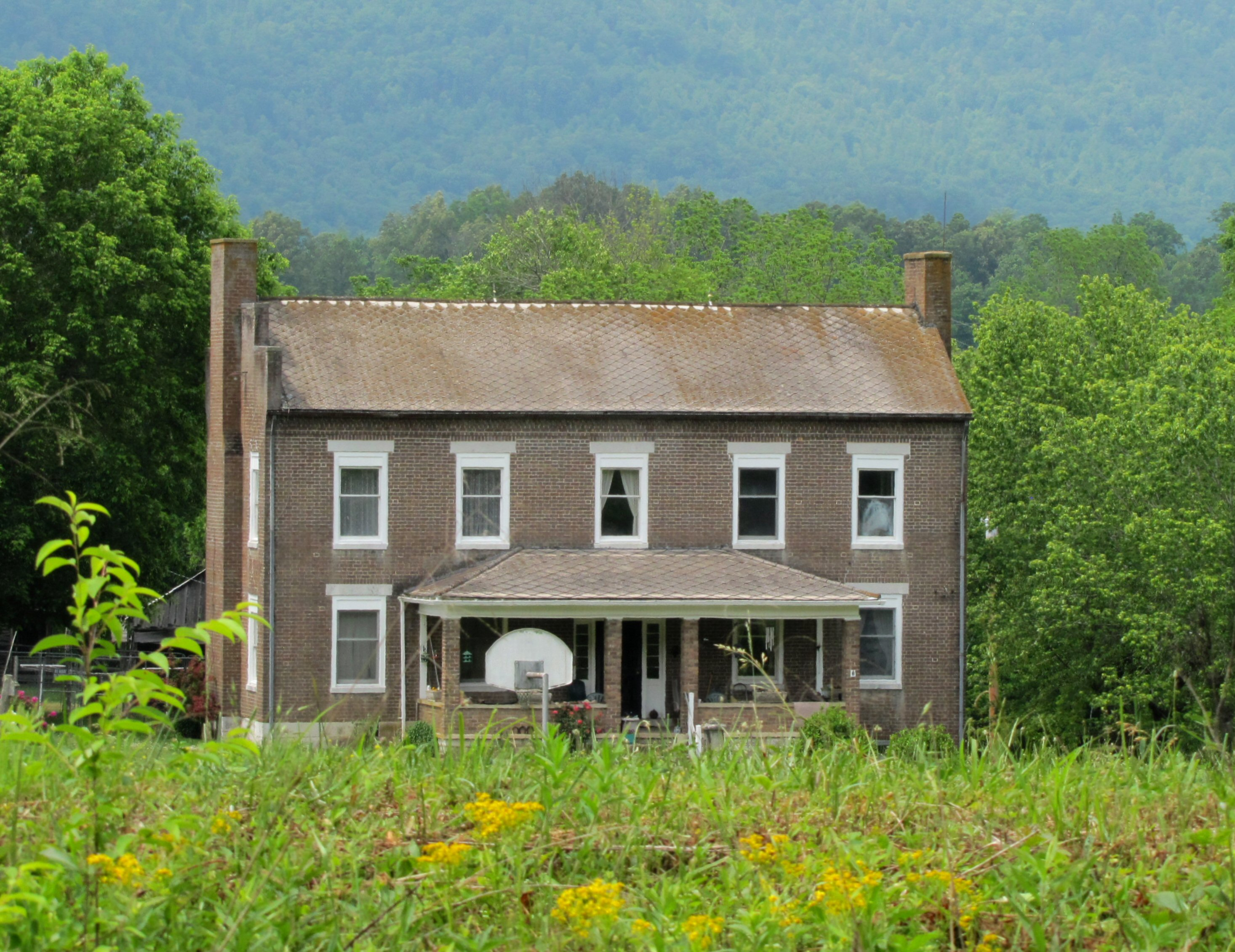

- Location within Tennessee Location within the United States
- Nearest city: Speedwell, Tennessee
- Coordinates: 36°28′5″N 83°49′22″W
- Area: less than one acre
- Built: 1840
- Architect: Kincaid, John, II
- NRHP reference No.: 82003957
- Added to NRHP: March 22, 1982

The Kincaid House is a historic house in Speedwell, Tennessee, U.S.. It was built circa 1840 by John Kincaid II for his brother, William Harrison Kincaid. In 1880, it was acquired by the Bryant family, who sold it to Bill Russell in 1898. It has been listed on the National Register of Historic Places since March 22, 1982.
