= National Register of Historic Places listings in Harlan County, Kentucky =

Location of Harlan County in Kentucky

This is a list of the National Register of Historic Places listings in Harlan County, Kentucky.

It is intended to be a complete list of the properties on the National Register of Historic Places in Harlan County, Kentucky, United States. The locations of National Register properties for which the latitude and longitude coordinates are included below, may be seen in a map.

There are 6 properties listed on the National Register in the county, including 1 National Historic Landmark. Another property was once listed but has been removed.

This National Park Service list is complete through NPS recent listings posted December 12, 2025.

== Current listings ==
	Name on the Register	Image	Date listed	Location	City or town	Description
1	Benham Historic District	Benham Historic District	July 21, 1983 (#83002785)	Kentucky Route 160, Central Ave., and McKnight and Cypress Sts. 36°57′48″N 82°57′02″W	Benham	Includes the Benham Company Store.
2	Cumberland Central Business District	Cumberland Central Business District	March 14, 1996 (#96000282)	Roughly bounded by Freeman St., Huff Dr., the Poor Fork of the Cumberland River, Cumberland Ave., and W. Main St. 36°58′31″N 82°59′27″W	Cumberland	
3	Cumberland Gap National Historical Park	Cumberland Gap National Historical Park	October 15, 1966 (#66000353)	East of Middlesboro along Kentucky-Virginia state line 36°40′00″N 83°27′00″W	Middlesboro	Extends into Bell County, Claiborne County, Tennessee and Lee County, Virginia
4	Harlan Commercial District	Harlan Commercial District	March 20, 1986 (#86000461)	Roughly bounded by Mound, Second, Clover, and Main Sts. 36°50′49″N 83°19′20″W	Harlan	
5	Lynch Historic District	Lynch Historic District	September 15, 2003 (#03000086)	Roughly bounded by the city limits, the L&N railroad bed, Big Looney Creek, and 2nd, Mountain, Highland Terrace, Liberty, and Church Sts. 36°57′52″N 82°55′04″W	Lynch	
6	Pine Mountain Settlement School	Pine Mountain Settlement School	September 6, 1978 (#78001337)	East of Bledsoe on Kentucky Route 510; 36°56′55″N 83°10′59″W	Bledsoe	

== Former listing ==
	Name on the Register	Image	Date listed	Date removed	Location	City or town	Description
1	Louisville and Nashville Railroad Depot	Louisville and Nashville Railroad Depot	March 13, 1980 (#80001537)	December 30, 1985	River St.	Harlan	

== See also ==
- List of National Historic Landmarks in Kentucky
- National Register of Historic Places listings in Kentucky
