= Grant-Lee Hall =

- U.S. National Register of Historic Places
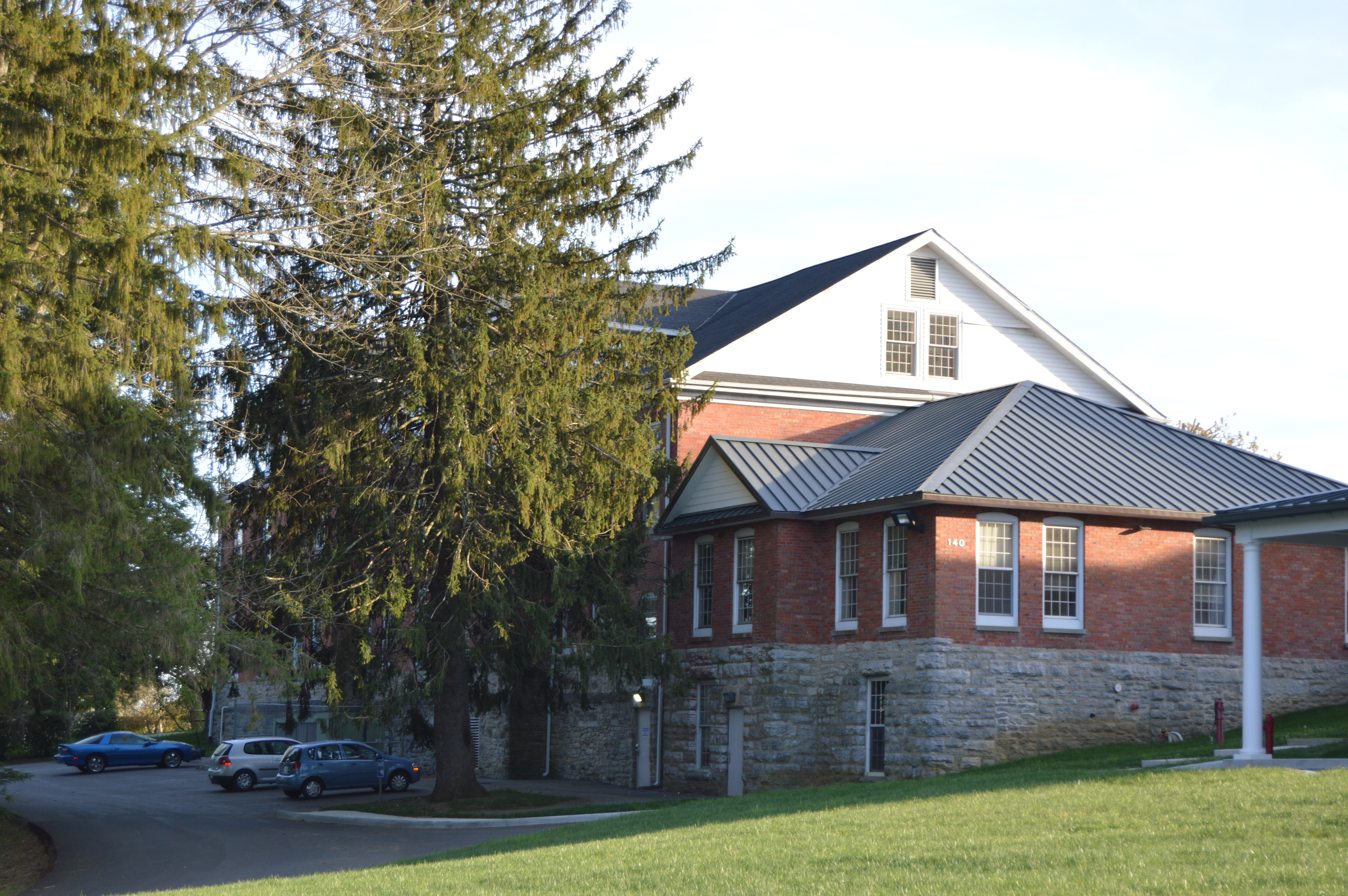
- The building in 2014

- Location within Tennessee
- Location: Lincoln Memorial University campus, Harrogate, Tennessee
- Coordinates: 36°34′47″N 83°39′50″W
- Area: less than one acre
- Built: 1917
- Architectural style: Romanesque
- NRHP reference No.: 78002575
- Added to NRHP: December 8, 1978

Grant-Lee Hall is a historic two-and-a-half-story building on the campus of Lincoln Memorial University in Harrogate, Tennessee. It was built in 1917 on the limestone foundations of a prior building completed in 1892, and it was designed in the Romanesque Revival architectural style. It "occupies the most prominent position" on the LMU campus. It has been listed on the National Register of Historic Places since December 8, 1978.
