= Westlands Water District =

Coordinates: 36.7797°N 119.781°W

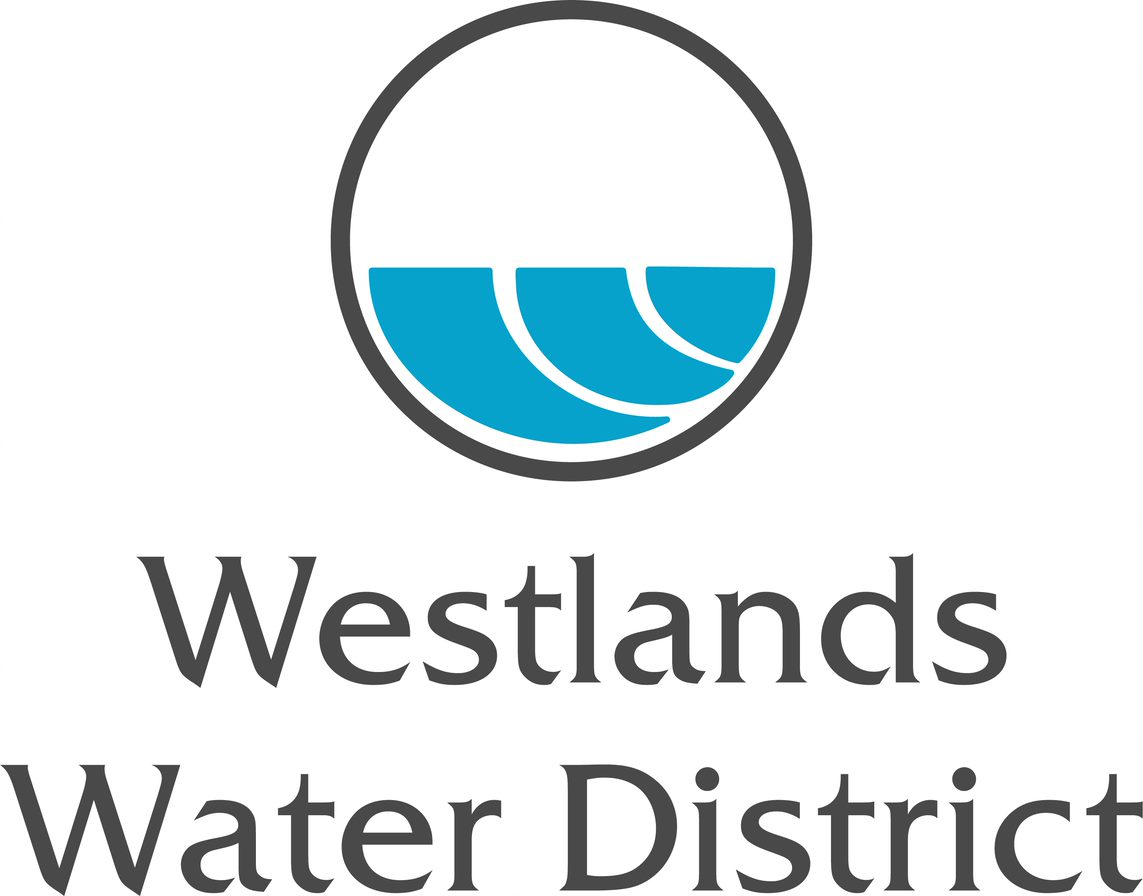

Agency overview
- Formed: September 8, 1952
- Headquarters: Fresno, California
- Website: https://wwd.ca.gov/

Westlands Water District is a water district in central California, a local-government entity formed in 1952, that holds long-term contracts for water supplied by the Central Valley Project and the California State Water Project.

It is the largest agricultural water district in the United States by irrigable acres and provides water primarily to farms in an area of approximately 614,000 acres (2,400 km^{2}) in Fresno County and Kings County in the San Joaquin Valley of central California. Its headquarters are in Fresno, outside of its service area. Field offices are located outside of Tranquillity, Five Points, and Huron.

== Background ==
Farms in Westlands make up less than one-tenth of the 6.9 million acres of farmland in California. It has been the focal point for many controversial water issues in California because of its size. Roughly 700 farmers own land, many of them are large (25,000 acres) but many also small.

Farmers in Westlands produce more than $2 billion in food and fiber crops annually – generating more than $4.7 billion in farm-related economic activity each year, supporting over 35,000 jobs in the regional economy.

== Operations ==
The Westlands Water District operates the Coalinga Canal and the Pleasant Valley Pumping Plant for the Central Valley Project.

== Sustainability Efforts ==
=== Sustainable Groundwater Management Act ===
The Sustainable Groundwater Management Act (SGMA) was signed into law by Governor Jerry Brown in 2014 to regulate groundwater pumping. It is designed to protect California's groundwater resources and, once fully implemented, will fundamentally change the way Californians use and manage groundwater in the state. In practice, the amount of groundwater available to pump will be capped to prevent undesirable results in California's aquifers. SGMA requires local agencies to form Groundwater Sustainability Agencies (GSAs). The GSA is responsible for developing a Groundwater Sustainability Plan (GSP) and Projects and Management Actions to achieve sustainability by 2040.

Westlands Water District serves as the GSA for the Westside Subbasin. The Westside Subbasin Groundwater Sustainability Plan (Westside GSP) was officially approved by the California Department of Water Resources (DWR) on August 7, 2023. The GSP was submitted by the Westlands Water District, in conforming to requirements of the SGMA. DWR had initially issued an incomplete determination on the plan in January 2022.

=== Groundwater Recharge Efforts ===
Groundwater recharge is a process that moves water from the surface into an underlying aquifer and is a critical tool to hedge against future droughts and help improve groundwater levels. In addition to implementing district-wide recharge projects, Westlands offers three groundwater recharge programs to help landowners recharge on their property. Project types include percolation basins, flood irrigation, sublateral recharge and dry well injection. Groundwater recharge efforts help meet SGMA obligations while allowing farmers to save water for the following year.

=== Solar fields ===
The Westlands Solar Park operate some 700 MW of solar panels on degraded soil.

== Legislative history ==
The Reclamation Act of 1902 required that farmers live on their land, because Westlands had many absent landowners at the time of federal contracting, and that they only receive water for 160 acres. From 1915 until the mid forties water from deep wells irrigated the land and lowered the water table.

In 1942, the 'Westside Landowners Association' formed to help finance studies of developing an alternative water supply for the west side. They contracted with the Bureau of Reclamation, to determine if surface water from the Central Valley Project (CVP) through an off-stream site at San Luis could reach west side lands.

In 1952, owners of 400,000 acres of west side land successfully petitioned the Fresno County Board of Supervisors to form a water district.

In 1961, the State of California signed a contract with the federal government for federal construction of the San Luis Unit of the CVP, including a drain, followed by its construction over 6 years and operation since 1968. The government had agreed to build a drain as well, well aware that the irrigation in parts of Westlands would saturate the root zone. Due to environmental concerns and budget constraints only the first part of the San Luis Drain was completed. The half-completed drain created Kesterson Wildlife Refuge.

Congress passed the 'Reclamation Reform Act of 1982', which increased allowable irrigated land to 960 acres (3.9 km^{2}) and struck the requirement that west side landowners remain near their lands. In 1985 the drain had to be closed by court order due to high levels of heavy metals, such as selenium, boron, chromium, molybdenum and salts in the drained water, violating environmental laws . The soil in the upslope regions of the district contains "extraordinarily elevated concentrations of selenium, boron, chromium, molybdenum, and extremely high concentrations of various salts that disrupt the normal ionic balance of the aquatic system." The California drought, beginning in 1987, led to reductions in surface water delivery.

In 2011, lawyer David L. Bernhardt and the Colorado-based law firm Brownstein Hyatt Farber Schreck filed a lawsuit for Westlands that "sought to force the feds to make good on a commitment to build a multibillion-dollar system to dispose of the poisoned water" resulting from toxic irrigation in the Westlands district. Later, through the 2017 bill HR 1769, Westlands agreed to drop the lawsuit in exchange for forgiven debt and long-term access to water from Central Valley Project facilities. In April 2017, the House Natural Resources Committee approved the settlement, but rejected an amendment that would have "barred former Westlands officials or lobbyists — meaning Bernhardt — from working on the drainage issue for five years." Through Brownstein Hyatt Farber Schreck, Bernhardt also represented Westlands Water District in "a lawsuit that sought to undo court-imposed protections for endangered salmon in the Sacramento-San Joaquin Delta."

In February 2020, 75 project customers, including the Westlands, received permanent federal water contracts for the Central Valley Project.

== Lobbying activities ==
Up until 2006 the Westlands Water District had spent less than $100,000 annually on lobbying. In 2006 it increased to $208,000, to pay two firms, and $266,000 in 2009 to pay three lobbying groups. In 2012 lobbying expenses further increased to $370,000, to pay three groups, and in 2013 to $600,000 for 5 lobbying groups and their 9 lobbyists. Until the end of 2016, David L. Bernhardt was both an attorney and lobbyist for Westlands. However, in November 2016 he delisted himself as a lobbyist, to avoid "running afoul of the new president's ban on lobbyists joining his administration." By April 2017, Bernhardt remained on a $20,000-a-month retainer with Westlands.

== See also ==
- San Joaquin River
- Water in California
- Sacramento-San Joaquin Valley Emergency Water Delivery Act (H.R. 3964; 113th Congress)
