= Ewing, Virginia =

Census-designated place in Lee County, Virginia

- Census-designated place
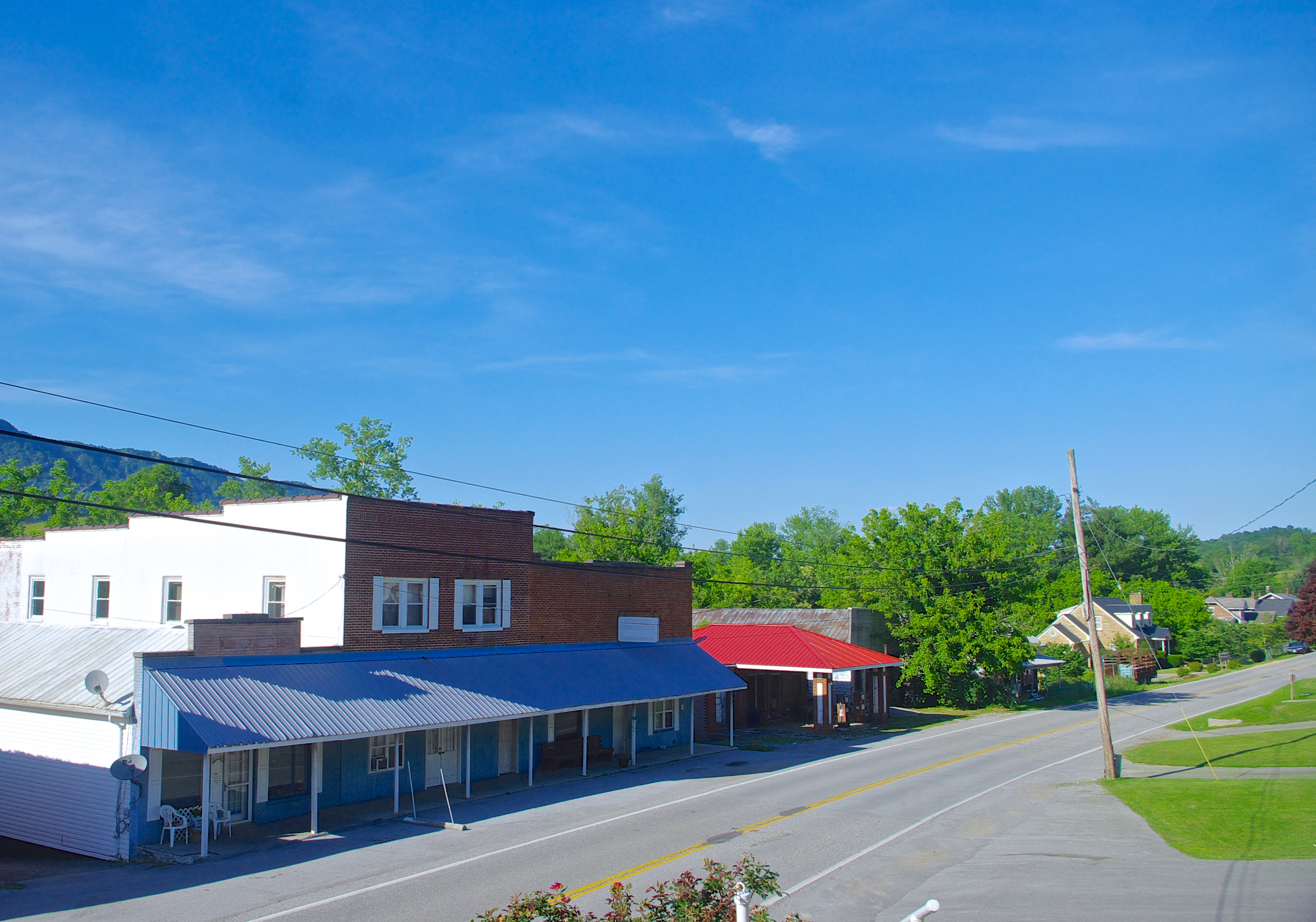
- Buildings along Ewing's Dr. Thomas Walker Road in 2017

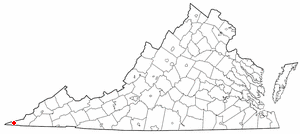
- Location of Ewing, Virginia
- Coordinates: 36°38′27″N 83°25′55″W
- Country: United States
- State: Virginia
- County: Lee

Area
  - Total: 3.76 sq mi (9.75 km^{2})
  - Land: 3.76 sq mi (9.75 km^{2})
  - Water: 0.0039 sq mi (0.01 km^{2})
- Elevation: 1,407 ft (429 m)

Population (2010)
  - Total: 439
  - Density: 120/sq mi (45/km^{2})
- Time zone: UTC−5 (Eastern (EST))
  - Summer (DST): UTC−4 (EDT)
- ZIP code: 24248
- Area code: 276
- FIPS code: 51-26384
- GNIS feature ID: 1466374

Ewing is an unincorporated community and census-designated place (CDP) in Lee County, Virginia, United States. As of the 2020 census, Ewing had a population of 381. Ewing is one of the westernmost settlements in the Commonwealth of Virginia, before reaching the Cumberland Gap and the borders with Kentucky and Tennessee. It is part of a small portion of Virginia that is closer to 9 state capitals than Richmond.

The Ewing post office was established in 1891.

Ewing is home to Thomas Walker High School and the Lincoln Memorial University Veterinarian Teaching and Research Center.

== Geography ==
Ewing is located in western Lee County at 36°38′27″N 83°25′55″W (36.640738, −83.431908). It is 2 miles (3 km) south of the Kentucky border, which follows the crest of Cumberland Mountain, and less than 3 miles (5 km) north of the Tennessee border. U.S. Route 58 passes through the center of town, leading east 20 miles (32 km) to Jonesville, the Lee county seat, and west 14 miles (23 km) to Cumberland Gap, Tennessee. Ewing is 404 miles (650 km) southwest of Richmond, the capital of Virginia.

According to the United States Census Bureau, the Ewing CDP has a total area of 3.7 square miles (9.7 km^{2}), of which 1.4 acres (5,768 m^{2}), or 0.06%, are water. Ewing is in the valley of Indian Creek, which flows west-southwest to join the Powell River in Tennessee.

== Demographics ==
Historical population
Census	Pop.	Note	%±
2000	436		—
2010	439		0.7%
2020	381		−13.2%
U.S. Decennial Census; 2000 2010 2020

Ewing was first listed as a census designated place in the 2000 U.S. census.

As of the census of 2000, there were 436 people, 183 households, and 127 families residing in the CDP. The population density was 112.4 people per square mile (43.4/km^{2}). There were 216 housing units at an average density of 55.7/sq mi (21.5/km^{2}). The racial makeup of the CDP was 99.31% White, 0.23% from other races, and 0.46% from two or more races. Hispanic or Latino of any race were 0.23% of the population.

There were 183 households, out of which 32.2% had children under the age of 18 living with them, 54.6% were married couples living together, 12.0% had a female householder with no husband present, and 30.1% were non-families. 27.9% of all households were made up of individuals, and 13.1% had someone living alone who was 65 years of age or older. The average household size was 2.38 and the average family size was 2.91.

In the CDP, the population was spread out, with 25.5% under the age of 18, 6.9% from 18 to 24, 24.8% from 25 to 44, 26.4% from 45 to 64, and 16.5% who were 65 years of age or older. The median age was 40 years. For every 100 females, there were 87.9 males. For every 100 females age 18 and over, there were 84.7 males.

The median income for a household in the CDP was $22,292, and the median income for a family was $30,278. Males had a median income of $26,154 versus $23,250 for females. The per capita income for the CDP was $11,722. About 20.3% of families and 27.1% of the population were below the poverty line, including 4.5% of those under age 18 and 42.7% of those age 65 or over.
