= Kesterson National Wildlife Refuge =

Artificial wetland environment in California, US

Coordinates: 37°15′30″N 120°53′34″W

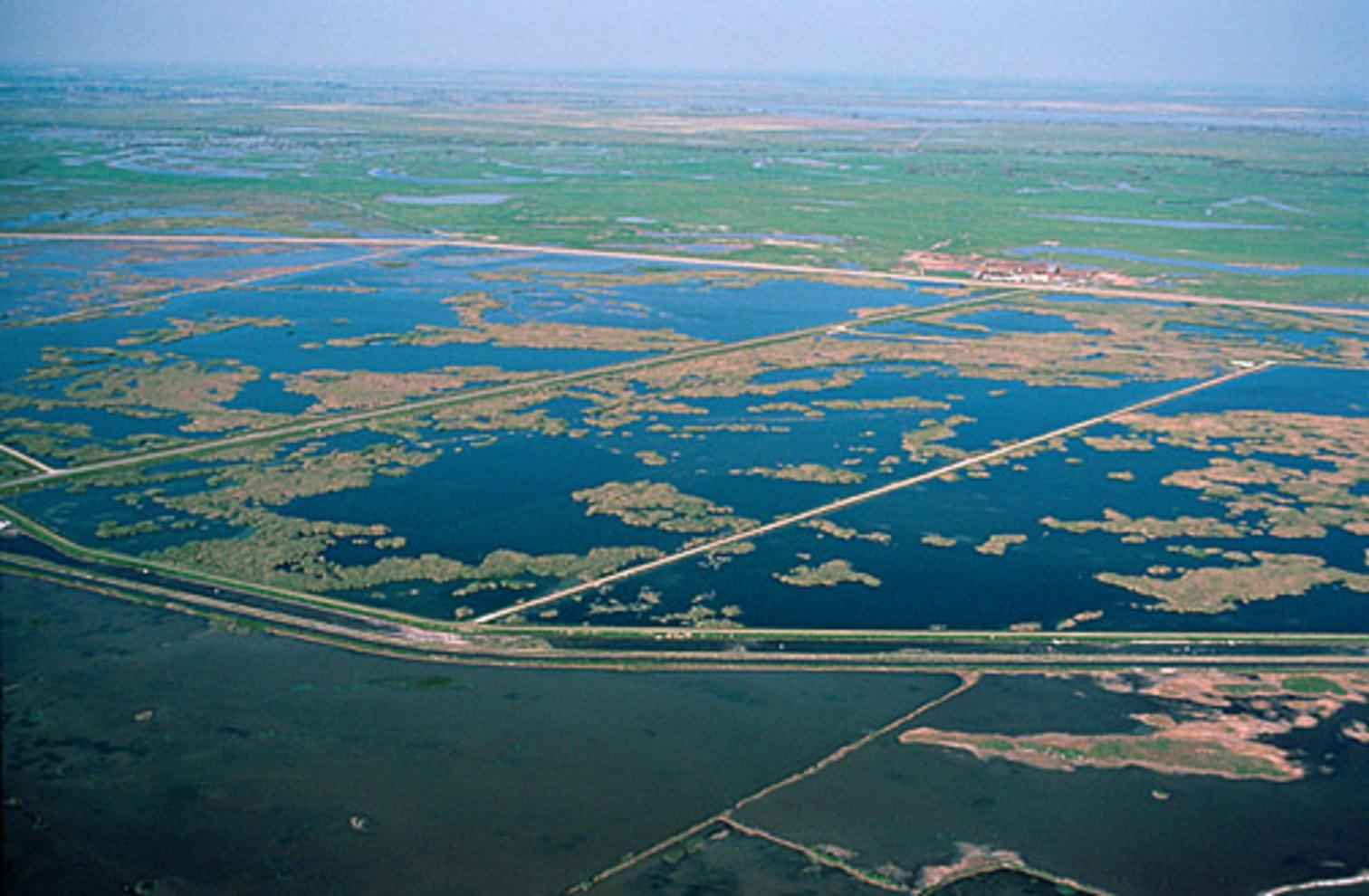
Evaporation ponds in the Kesterson National Wildlife Refuge

The Kesterson National Wildlife Refuge was an artificial wetland environment, created using agricultural runoff from farmland in California's Central Valley.

The irrigation water is transported to the valley from sources in the Sierra Nevada via the California Aqueduct. Minerals from these sources are carried in the water and concentrated by evaporation from aqueducts, canals, and fields. This has resulted in an exceptionally high accumulation of selenium and other minerals in the wetlands. Wildlife in this region suffered deformities due to selenium poisoning, drawing the attention of news media and leading to the closure of the refuge.

Kesterson Reservoir was a unit of the refuge but is now part of San Luis National Wildlife Refuge.

== Westlands-Kesterson Timeline ==
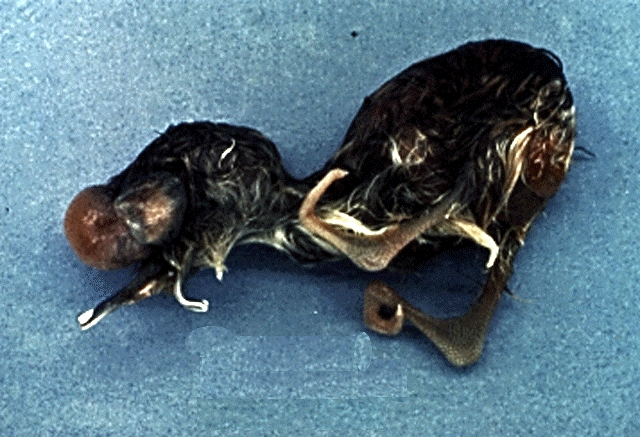
Deformed Duckling

- 1952 - Westlands Water District is formed and would become the nation's largest water district, covering 600,000 acres
- 1961 - United States Bureau of Reclamation (USBR) agrees to build San Luis Reservoir and a runoff drain that would benefit the Westlands
- 1975 - Funding for the Westlands drain cut by Congress resulting in toxic run-off diverted to Kesterson National Wildlife Refuge evaporation ponds
- 1977 Nov 5 - 529 page federal report finds USBR failed to breakup corporate ownership in Westlands over 160 acre limit
- 1978 - 7,000 acre-feet of toxic water laced with selenium and pesticides sent annually to Kesterson evaporation ponds flows into wildlife reserve
- 1983 - 60% of baby birds are deformed within Kesterson National Wildlife Refuge where contaminated water is sent
- 1985 - Publication of "Tragedy at Kesterson Reservoir: Death of a Wildlife Refuge Illustrates Failings of Water Law"
- 1996 - USBR and State of California form Grasslands Bypass Project to divert contaminated water from going into Kesterson
- 2000 Mar 1 - Court of Appeals orders USBR to construct Central Valley Project (CVP) Drain
- Jun 9 - $450 million water plan proposed by Governor Gray Davis includes raising Shasta Dam height
- 2002 Feb 13 - Natural Resources Defense Council appeals judge's ruling over how much CVP water can be retained for wildlife
- Nov 17 - USBR close to making deal to buy contaminated lands in Westlands
- 2004 Apr 22 - Sac Express The Rich get wetter
- Jul 14 - Court order allows for protection of fish in Trinity River with water
- Sep 14 - EWG Less Land, More Water Soaking Uncle Sam
- 2007 Aug 30 - California fishing e-magazine publishes, "Westlands wants to raise Shasta Dam and grab $40 billion in subsidized water"
- 2009 Jun 10 - TJA CVP pumping changes to protect fish
- 2012 Mar 2 - Court of Appeals ends thirteen-year legal battle between Westlands and Interior Department in government's favor
- 2017 Mar 17 - San Luis Unit Drainage Resolution Act (H.R.1769) proposed to deal with Kesterson drainage
- May 18 - Ex-Westlands Water District lobbyist picked for key Department of the Interior post
- Nov 10 - USBR and Westlands Water District settlement in limbo
- 2018 Jan 23 - Deadline passes but Westlands confident of help from Congress
- May 3 - Billions at play over Kesterson impacts and the growing pressure to accept deal from Westland's big farmers
- 2019 May 1 - USBR-Westlands drainage deal for CVP water: Who's who and what's involved
- May 23 - Congressional Research Service releases new report on the CVP and legislative proposals
- Sept 6 - Environmentalists win Appeals Court victory against San Joaquin Valley agricultural polluters
- Nov 15 - Interior Secretary David Bernhardt, who was the former lawyer for Westlands proposes permanent CVP water contract

== See also ==
- Selenium pollution
