= Middlesboro Downtown Commercial District =

Historic district in Kentucky, United States

- U.S. National Register of Historic Places
- U.S. Historic district
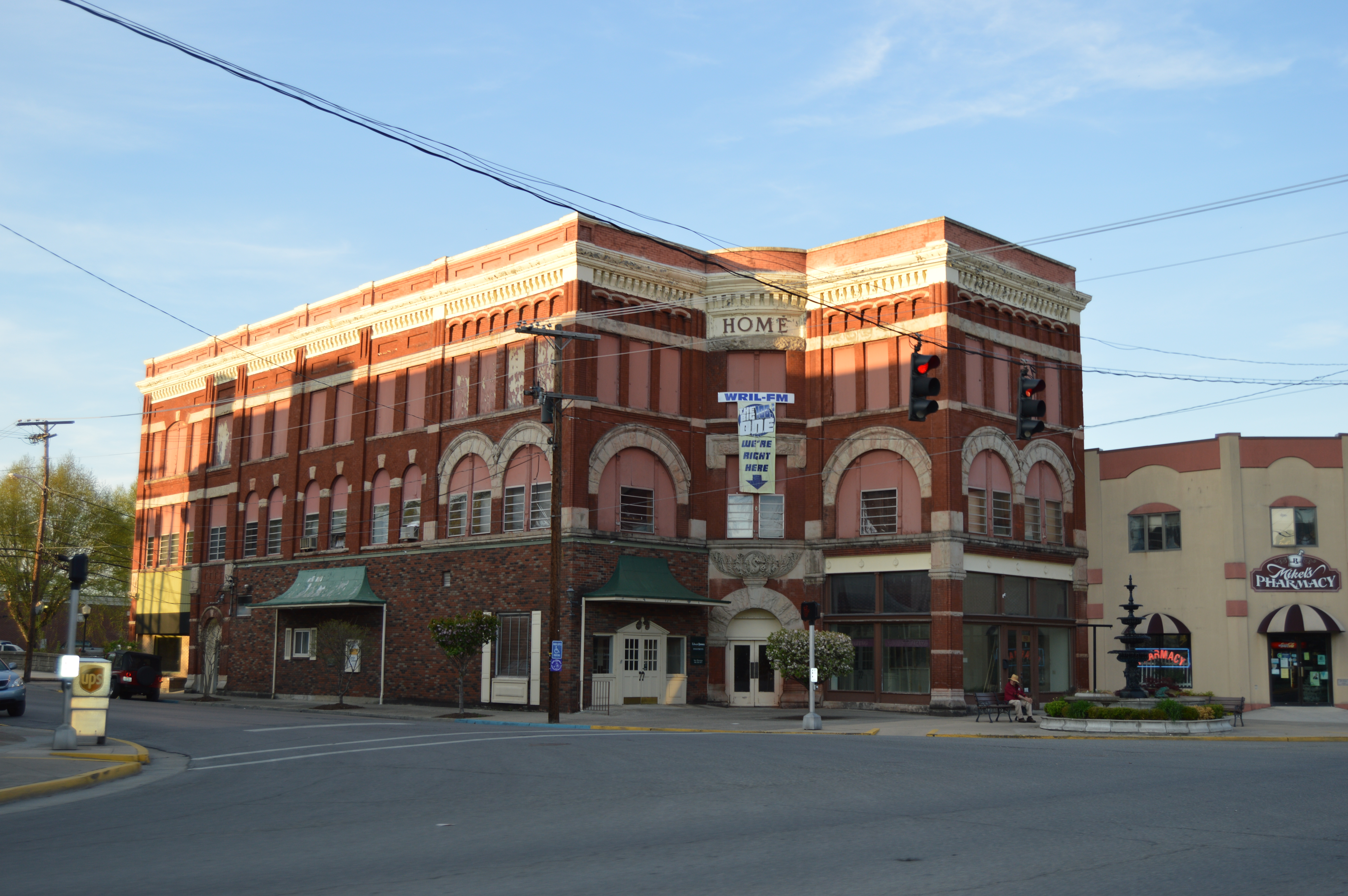

- Location within Kentucky Location within the United States
- Location: Roughly bounded by Cumberland Ave., 19th, and 20th Streets, and Edgewood Rd., Middlesboro, Kentucky
- Coordinates: 36°36′30″N 83°42′50″W
- Area: 37 acres (15 ha)
- Architectural style: Late 19th and 20th Century Revivals, Mixed (more Than 2 Styles From Different Periods)
- NRHP reference No.: 83002554
- Added to NRHP: January 10, 1983

The Middlesboro Downtown Commercial District in Middlesboro, Kentucky is a 37 acres (15 ha) historic district which was listed on the National Register of Historic Places in 1983.

It is roughly bounded by Cumberland Ave., 19th Street, 20th Street, and Edgewood Road. It included 61 contributing buildings, including a post office.

It includes the original downtown core.

Contributing buildings include:

- Old City Hall
- the Coal House, "now the Chamber of Commerce, which is built entirely of coal"(!)
- the United States Post Office (1915), Classical Revival in style
- the old Carnegie Library, a one-story classical masonry structure
- the First Presbyterian Church, built in 1889 and expanded in 1912.
