= Jonesville Methodist Campground =

- U.S. National Register of Historic Places
- Virginia Landmarks Register
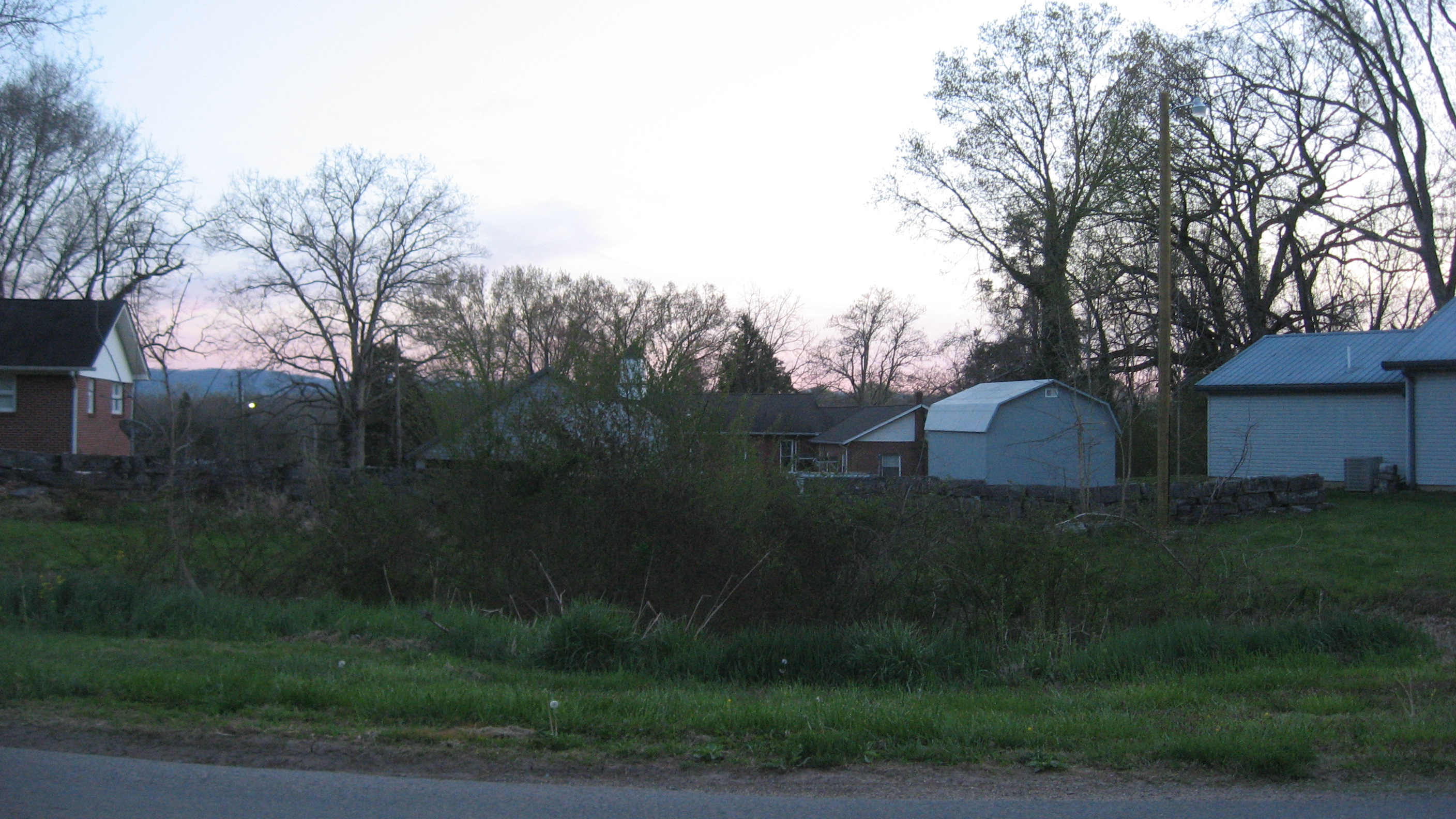
- Buildings at the campground

- Location within Virginia Location within the United States
- Location: West of Jonesville at the junction of U.S. Route 58 and State Route 652, near Jonesville, Virginia
- Coordinates: 36°40′57″N 83°8′38″W
- Area: 1 acre (0.40 ha)
- Built: 1810
- NRHP reference No.: 74002133
- VLR No.: 052-0007

Significant dates
- Added to NRHP: May 16, 1974
- Designated VLR: July 17, 1973

Jonesville Methodist Campground is a historic Methodist campground located near Jonesville, Lee County, Virginia. The property consists of a broad lawn where the congregation erect their tents, and the permanent pavilion-like auditorium. The auditorium is a gable roofed structure measuring 76 feet long and 36 feet wide, with a 12 feet deep shed addition. The camp ground land was given to the trustees of the Methodist Church in 1827 by Elkanah Wynn.

It was listed on the National Register of Historic Places in 1974.
