= Keokee, Virginia =

- Census-designated place
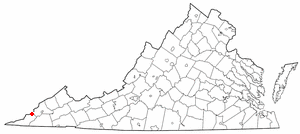
- Location of Keokee, Virginia
- Coordinates: 36°51′24″N 82°54′28″W
- Country: United States
- State: Virginia
- County: Lee

Area
  - Total: 4.81 sq mi (12.46 km^{2})
  - Land: 4.71 sq mi (12.20 km^{2})
  - Water: 0.10 sq mi (0.26 km^{2})
- Elevation: 2,080 ft (634 m)

Population (2010)
  - Total: 416
  - Density: 88/sq mi (34.1/km^{2})
- Time zone: UTC−5 (Eastern (EST))
  - Summer (DST): UTC−4 (EDT)
- ZIP code: 24265
- Area code: 276
- FIPS code: 51-42104
- GNIS feature ID: 1495785

Keokee is an unincorporated community and census-designated place (CDP) in Lee County, Virginia, United States. As of the 2020 census, Keokee had a population of 330.

== History ==
The Keokee post office was established in 1906.

Keokee Store No. 1 was listed on the National Register of Historic Places in 2007.

== Geography ==
Keokee is located in the northeast corner of Lee County at 36°51′24″N 82°54′28″W (36.856575, −82.907861). The CDP includes the neighboring unincorporated communities of Darnell Town and Rawhide. It is bordered to the north by the state of Kentucky; the state boundary follows the 3,000-foot-high (910 m) crest of Little Black Mountain.

According to the United States Census Bureau, the CDP has a total area of 4.8 square miles (12.5 km^{2}), of which 4.7 square miles (12.2 km^{2}) are land and 0.1 square miles (0.3 km^{2}), or 2.07%, are water. The area drains south toward the North Fork of the Powell River, part of the Tennessee River watershed.

Keokee is 15 miles (24 km) by road northeast of Pennington Gap, the largest town in Lee County, and 13 miles (21 km) west of Big Stone Gap. Virginia Secondary Route 624 leads north to the Kentucky border at the top of Little Black Mountain, where it becomes Kentucky Route 38, which leads west down the Clover Fork of the Cumberland River valley to Harlan, Kentucky, 31 miles (50 km) from Keokee.

== Demographics ==
Historical population
Census	Pop.	Note	%±
2000	316		—
2020	330		—
U.S. Decennial Census; 2000 2010 2020

Keokee was first listed as a census designated place in the 2000 U.S. census.

As of the census of 2000, there were 316 people, 128 households, and 88 families residing in the CDP. The population density was 72.9 people per square mile (28.1/km^{2}). There were 147 housing units at an average density of 33.9/sq mi (13.1/km^{2}). The racial makeup of the CDP was 97.78% White and 2.22% from two or more races. Hispanic or Latino of any race were 0.95% of the population.

There were 128 households, out of which 30.5% had children under the age of 18 living with them, 52.3% were married couples living together, 13.3% had a female householder with no husband present, and 30.5% were non-families. 28.1% of all households were made up of individuals, and 14.1% had someone living alone who was 65 years of age or older. The average household size was 2.47 and the average family size was 3.02.

In the CDP, the population was spread out, with 25.3% under the age of 18, 6.3% from 18 to 24, 27.8% from 25 to 44, 25.9% from 45 to 64, and 14.6% who were 65 years of age or older. The median age was 40 years. For every 100 females, there were 109.3 males. For every 100 females age 18 and over, there were 101.7 males.

The median income for a household in the CDP was $22,875, and the median income for a family was $23,438. Males had a median income of $22,639 versus $23,229 for females. The per capita income for the CDP was $11,025. About 19.4% of families and 20.9% of the population were below the poverty line, including 27.1% of those under the age of 18 and none of those 65 and older.
