= Keokee Store No. 1 =

Historic commercial building in Virginia, United States

- U.S. National Register of Historic Places
- Virginia Landmarks Register
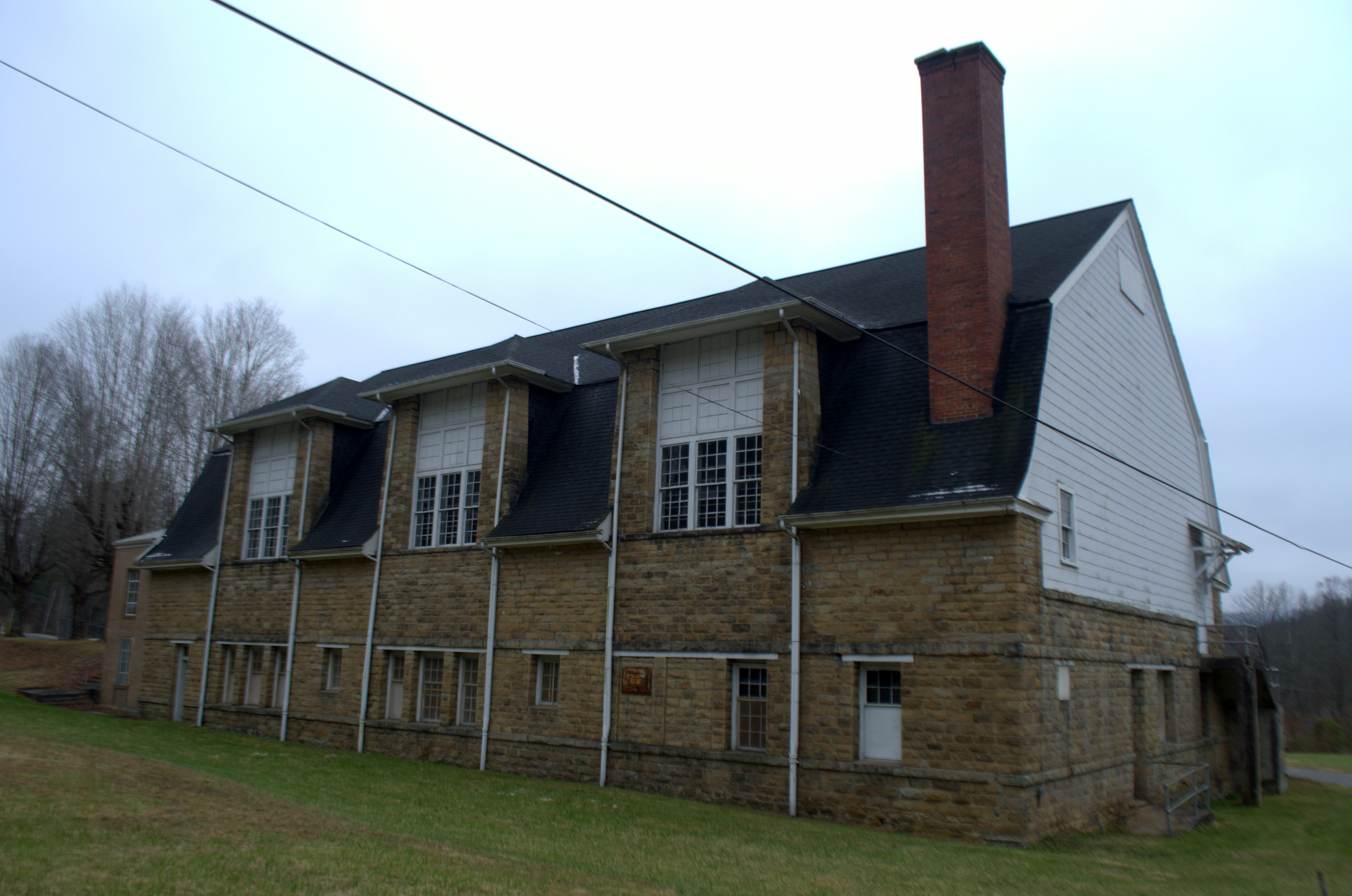

- Location within Virginia Location within the United States
- Location: Cty Rd. 606, Keokee, Virginia
- Coordinates: 36°51′49″N 82°54′01″W
- Area: 1.2 acres (0.49 ha)
- Built: 1910, 1939
- Architectural style: Bungalow/craftsman
- NRHP reference No.: 07000397
- VLR No.: 052-0066

Significant dates
- Added to NRHP: April 30, 2007
- Designated VLR: March 7, 2007

Keokee Store No. 1, also known as the Keokee High School Gymnasium and Darnell's Store, is a historic company store located at Keokee, Lee County, Virginia. It was built in 1910, by the Stonega Coke and Coal Company, and is two-story, gambrel-roofed stone building that has been altered both internally and externally from a community store into a school gymnasium. It was significantly modified in 1939, and the modifications continued through 1954. The building serves as a facility for athletic, educational, and entertainment activities.

It was listed on the National Register of Historic Places in 2007.
