= Darnell =

Darnell is a given name and a surname. Variants include Darnelle and Durnell. The surname is of English and French origin.

Darnell or Darnelle may refer to:

== Given name ==
- Darnelle Bailey-King (born 1997), English footballer
- Darnell Bing (born 1984), American football player
- Darnell Bristol, American songwriter, former member of The Deele
- Darnell Clash (born 1962), American football player
- Darnell Coles (born 1962), American baseball player
- Darnell Dinkins (born 1977), American footballer
- Darnell Dockett (born 1981), American footballer
- Darnell Earley, American government official
- Darnell Edge (born 1997), American basketball player in the Israeli Basketball Premier League
- Darnell Ferguson (born 1987), American chef and restaurateur
- Darnell Hillman (born 1949), American basketball player
- Darnell Hunt (born 1962), American sociologist
- Darnell Johnson (born 1998), English footballer
- Darnell King (born 1990), American soccer player
- Darnell Martin (born 1964), African-American woman film director
- Darnell McDonald (born 1978), American baseball player
- Darnell McDonald (gridiron football) (born 1976), American football player
- Darnell Mooney (born 1997), American football player
- Darnell Nurse (born 1995), Canadian ice hockey player
- Darnell Savage (born 1997), American football player
- Darnell Swallow, a contestant on the 2008 series of Big Brother (UK)
- Darnell Valentine (born 1959), American basketball player
- Darnell Washington (born 2001), American football player
- Darnell Keith Washington (born 1988), American convicted murderer, robber and carjacker
- Darnell Williams (born 1955), American actor
- Darnell Wilson (born 1974), American boxer
- Darnell Wright (born 2001), American football player

== Surname ==
- August Darnell, a stage name (along with Kid Creole) of American musician, singer and songwriter Thomas August Darnell Browder (born 1950)
- Billy Darnell (1926–2007), American professional wrestler
- Bruce Darnell (born 1957), American model and choreographer
- Colleen Darnell (born 1980), American Egyptologist
- Eric Darnell (born 1961), American film director
- Erik Darnell (born 1982), American stock car racing driver
- Gary Darnell (born 1948), American College football player and coach
- James E. Darnell (born 1930), American biologist
- Jean Darnell (1889–1961), American silent film actress
- John Coleman Darnell (born 1962), American Egyptologist
- Kylan Darnell, American beauty pageant winner and internet celebrity
- Larry Darnell (1928–1983), American singer
- Linda Darnell (1923–1965), American film actress
- Mike Darnell (born 1962), American television executive
- Nicholas Henry Darnell (1807–1885), American politician
- Regna Darnell (born 1943), American-Canadian anthropologist and professor
- Riley Darnell (1940–2020), American politician
- Robert B. Darnell (born 1957), American biologist

== Fictional characters ==
- Darnell Fetzervalve, in the American stop motion comedy television series Buddy Thunderstruck, voiced by Ted Raimi
- Darnell Turner, in the American television show My Name Is Earl
- Darnell, a troll from the animated films Trolls World Tour (2020) and Trolls Band Together (2023)
- Darnell, in the Pico's School and Friday Night Funkin' video games
- Darnelle, in the 2005 film Beauty Shop, played by Keshia Knight Pulliam

== See also ==
- Durnell (disambiguation)
