= Kesterson Reservoir =

Selenium-contaminated evaporation ponds historically used for agricultural drainage

- Location within California Location within the United States
- Location: Merced County, California
- Coordinates: 37.25833°N 120.89167°W
- Type: reservoir

The Kesterson Reservoir is part of the current San Luis National Wildlife Refuge in California. Formerly a unit of the Kesterson National Wildlife Refuge, the reservoir was an important stopping point for migratory waterfowl. Kesterson once consisted of 12 evaporation ponds totaling approximately 1,280 acres, and was historically used for agricultural drainage. Kesterson gained national attention during the latter half of the 20th century due to selenium toxicity and rapid die off of migratory waterfowl, fish, insects, plants and algae. The reservoir was closed in 1986, and concentrations of selenium at the site have continued to be monitored throughout remediation efforts.

== Background ==
The Kesterson National Wildlife Refuge is located approximately 18 miles west of Merced County in the San Luis National Wildlife Refuge, in the San Joaquin Valley of central California. The refuge is 26,609 acres (107.68 km^{2}) and includes a variety of wetland and riparian habitat which supports a large variety of waterfowl, mammals and other wildlife across four units, the Kesterson Reservoir, Freitas, Bear Creek and original San Luis Units.

The San Joaquin Valley, considered by historian Kevin Starr as "the most productive unnatural environment on Earth", supports approximately 25% of the United States’ agricultural products including grapes, cotton, nuts, citrus, and vegetables. Cattle and sheep ranching also contribute to the agricultural output of the area. The valley grew rich in phosphoric acid during prehistoric times, when as an inland lake it provided a habitat for clams. The accumulation of these shells made the land rich in phosphoric acid.

The San Joaquin Valley is bordered on the west by the Coast Range and on the east by the Sierra Nevada mountains. The Coast Range include Cretaceous and Tertiary marine sedimentary rocks. Weathering and oxidation of the Moreno Formation, a black marine shale, produces Pyrite, FeS_{2}, and Iron Selenide, FeSe_{2}. As the weathered products concentrate in evaporative minerals and salts, selenates (for instance, Na_{2}SeO_{4} · 10 H_{2}O or Na_{2}Mg(SeO_{4})_{2} · 4 H_{2}O) and Sulfates (Na_{2}SO_{4} · 10 H_{2}O or Na_{2}Mg(SO_{4})_{4} · 4 H_{2}O) can form. This results in selenium salts and selenium rich soils that are sloughed off the mountains via debris flows or landslides into the San Joaquin valley. Additionally, the San Joaquin Valley has a shallow aquifer bounded by impermeable clays.

Large-scale agricultural production relies on similarly large-scale irrigation projects in order to keep fertile farms in operation. A side effect of irrigation in the San Joaquin Valley was that ground water levels began to rise over time. This led to a condition where excess water was accumulating and harming crops. In 1968, the Bureau of Reclamation proposed a 290-mile long drainage canal, called the San Luis Drain. As part of the large drainage canal the Kesterson Reservoir, which consisted of 12 evaporation ponds, was completed in 1971 within the Kesterson National Wildlife Refuge.

== Timeline ==
- 1960s: The San Luis Drain (290-mile drainage canal) was proposed by California officials.
- 1971: As part of the larger drainage canal, Kesterson Reservoir was completed by the Bureau of Reclamation.
- 1975: After only 82 miles of the 290-mile drainage canal was completed, the project was suspended due to environmental concerns and Kesterson became the temporary terminus of the drainage system.
- 1978: The Westland's Water District, part of the San Joaquin Valley, began draining 7,300 ace-ft on average of subsurface drainage annually into Kesterson.
- 1983–1985: Research as Kesterson was conducted to evaluate the effects of agricultural drainage water on aquatic birds. Due to the initial findings, the California State Water Resources Control Board ordered the closure of the reservoir.
- 1986: Scientists discovered bird deformities at Kesterson.
- 1989–2014: Remediation efforts and monitoring were conducted by the United States Bureau of Reclamation and the US Department of Interior.
- 2000–2013: Westland landowners issue several lawsuits against the Federal Government to provide an alternative drainage system.
- 2014: Se concentrations reached relatively stable levels below concentrations of 4 μg/g.

== Contamination ==
In 1985 Kesterson Reservoir was issued an abatement order to close by the California State Resources Control Board due to the 1983 discovery of a 64% rate of deformity and death of embryos and hatchlings of wild aquatic birds. According to the USGS, the high deformity and death rates were a result of selenium contamination traced through irrigation drainage and sourced to the bedrock of the California Coast Ranges. The USGS defined the biogeochemical pathway of selenium moving "from rock to duck” as the 'Kesterson effect". The group of symptoms and effects observed in birds from research at Kesterson Reservoir is known as "Kesterson Syndrome".

Selenium is a naturally occurring element in the environment, and is an essential dietary nutrient. However, in high concentrations, selenium bioaccumulates to toxic levels in tissues and can cause reproductive failure and birth defects, or deposit in sediments. Due to the concentration of selenium in the Coast Range west of the San Joaquin Valley, selenium was transported into the valley and naturally accumulated on the valley floor. Selenium toxicity became a problem shortly after drainage tiles were installed at Kesterson. Initially (from 1971 to 1978), the reservoir received only fresh water. In 1978 this began to change and by 1981, all water coming into the Kesterson Reservoir was saline drainage water. Contributing to the salinity of the drainage water was the highly-mobile ion of selenium, selenate, SeO_{4}^{2−}. In 1983 selenium concentrations, primarily in the selenate form, were about 300 μg/L. From 1981 to 1986 about 9000 kg of Se were delivered to Kesterson. Concentrations of selenium in the reservoir increased steadily as the drainage water evaporated from the 12 evaporation ponds. Selenium began to bioaccumulate in the waterfowl and wildlife that used the reservoir.

Prior to 1981, the Kesterson Reservoir supported a wide variety of life, including several species of fish. After 1981, the reservoir only supported the most saline tolerant mosquito fish. In 1982, the United States Fish and Wildlife Service began a study to determine the cause for declining wildlife use at the reservoir. Selenium concentrations at these locations were found to be greater than 1400 micrograms per liter. Mosquito fish samples from 1982 showed that fish from the Kesterson Reservoir contained selenium concentrations more than 70 times higher than fish sampled from a nearby reference site.

In 1983, researchers investigated the prevalence of selenium in the diets and tissues of the birds of the Kesterson Reservoir. The study found that selenium contamination was primarily responsible for the increased incidence of developmental abnormalities in early life stage fish and birds. Abnormalities included missing or deformed eyes, beaks, wings, legs, and brains. When compared to a control site, selenium concentrations in adult birds at Kesterson were found to be 10 times higher, and selenium concentrations in bird eggs were 20-30 times higher. Overall reductions in body weight were also observed. Concentrations of selenium in bird tissues were found to be positively correlated with the residence time, feeding frequency, and selenium concentration in the birds' diets. Increases in selenium concentration were also observed in plants, fungi, insects, mammals, and fish residing in the reservoir. However, birds are among most sensitive animals to elevated selenium exposure. Due to a steady loss of wetland habitat in California, the Kesterson Reservoir was an important stopping point for migratory birds. For this reason, the high levels of selenium in the reservoir had a substantial effect on bird populations. The findings of the 1983 study were published in newspapers and broadcast on TV, bringing national attention to the issue. This eventually led to the closing of the reservoir in 1986.

== Remediation and aftermath ==
After the California State Water Resources Control Board issued a Cleanup and Abatement Order for Kesterson in 1985, the United States Bureau of Reclamation and US Department of the Interior undertook actions to reduce the amount of hazards faced by birds at Kesterson. The United States Bureau of Reclamation and the US Department of Interior undertook remedial actions including filling 713 acres of Kesterson with about 1 million cubic yards of soil and cutting down cattails to eliminate nesting habitats for birds. These actions established 3 primary types of terrestrial habitat including grassland, fill areas dominated by annual plant species, and open areas formerly occupied by cattails. While Se contamination at Kesterson only occurred over a few years, remediation efforts took more than 20 years. Total remediation costs are estimated at $21 million. Additional research conducted at Kesterson determined that microbial volatilization as a bioremediation approach may contribute to considerable removal of selenium from seleniferous soils.

Monitoring began in 1989 and decreased in intensity in 2012. Se monitoring results from 2013 to 2014 indicated that Se concentrations were relatively stable over time such that foraging animals were primarily exposed to concentrations below 4 μg/g. It is recognized that large-scale changes such as flooding may result in rapid mobilization of selenium and greater risk to wildlife. Current alternatives for drainage of contaminated irrigation water are being evaluated, and currently include membrane treatment, selenium removal treatment, and evaporation ponds.

== See also ==
- List of lakes in California
