= Dickinson–Milbourn House =

Historic house in Virginia, United States

- U.S. National Register of Historic Places
- Virginia Landmarks Register
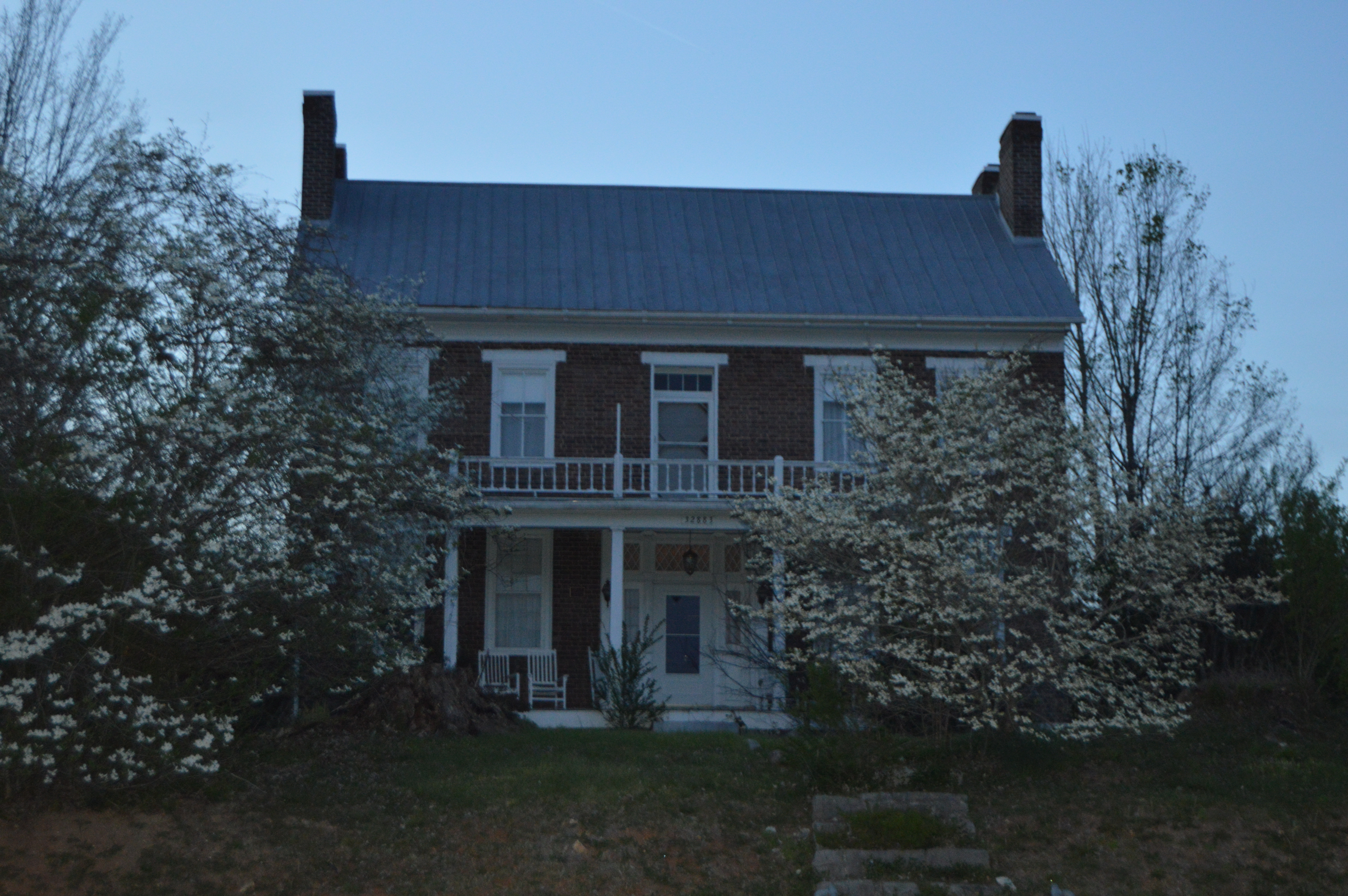
- Front of the house

- Location within Virginia Location within the United States
- Location: U.S. Route 58, near Jonesville, Virginia
- Coordinates: 36°41′12″N 83°7′25″W
- Area: 4 acres (1.6 ha)
- Built: 1844-1848
- Architectural style: Federal
- NRHP reference No.: 93000825
- VLR No.: 245-0004

Significant dates
- Added to NRHP: August 12, 1993
- Designated VLR: June 16, 1993

Dickinson–Milbourn House is a historic home located near Jonesville, Lee County, Virginia. It was built between 1844 and 1848, and is a two-story, five-bay, gable roofed brick dwelling. It has a central passage plan and a pair of semi-exterior end brick chimneys at each gable end. Also on the property is the contributing large brick smokehouse.

It was listed on the National Register of Historic Places in 1993.
