= Kesterson-Watkins House =

- U.S. National Register of Historic Places
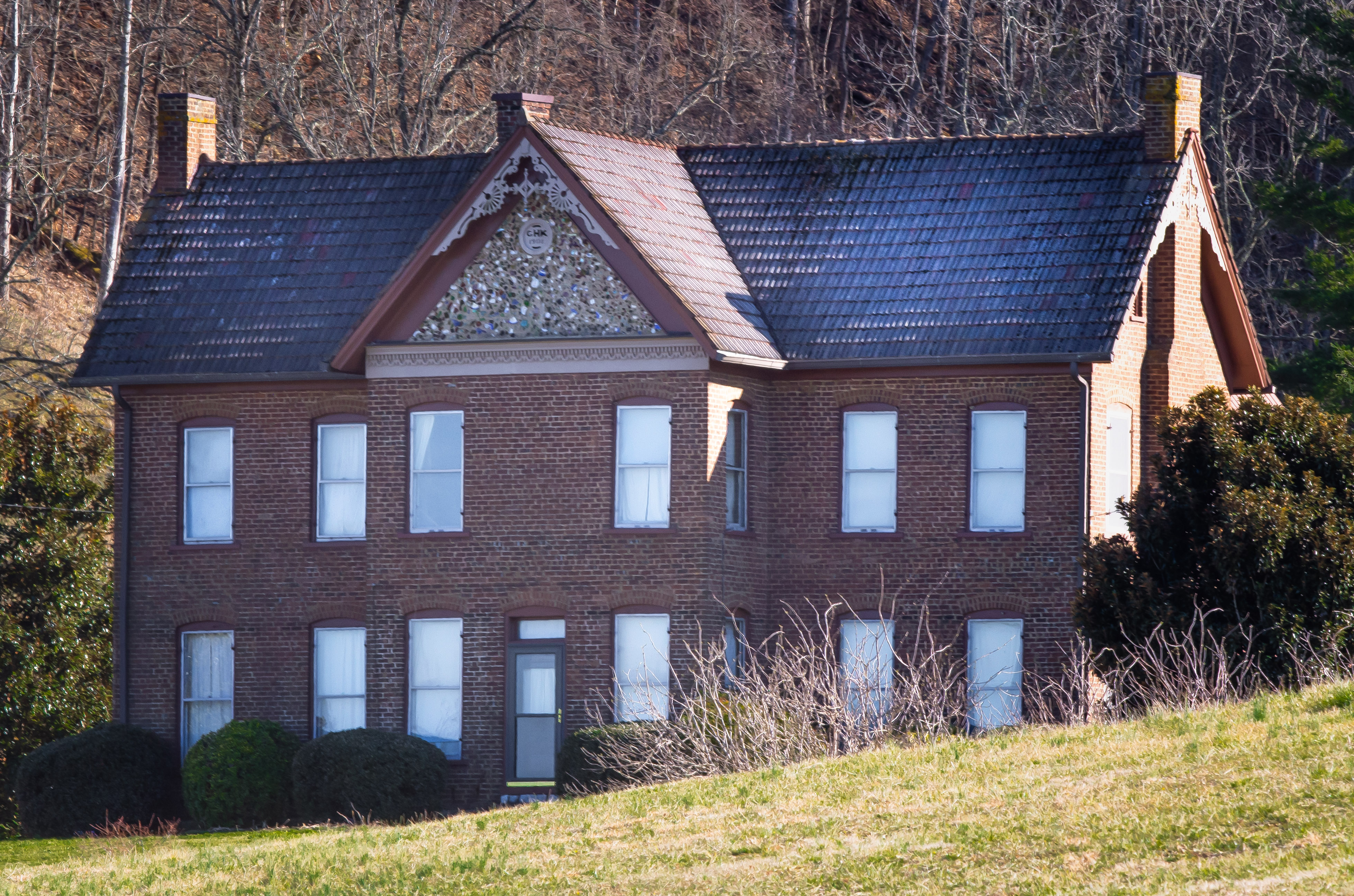

- Location within Tennessee
- Nearest city: Tazewell, Tennessee
- Coordinates: 36°29′36″N 83°29′38″W
- Area: 4 acres (1.6 ha)
- Built: 1900
- Built by: Gary H. Kesterson
- Architectural style: Victorian
- NRHP reference No.: 82003958
- Added to NRHP: April 26, 1982

The Kesterson-Watkins House is a historic two-story farm house in Tazewell, Tennessee. It was built in 1900 by Gary H. Kesterson, a tobacco farmer, and designed in the Victorian architectural style. It was purchased by Kesterson's son-in-law, White Gibson, in 1920, and later inherited by Gibson's daughter, Velma Gibson Watkins. It has been listed on the National Register of Historic Places since April 26, 1982.
