= Darnell Town, Virginia =

Unincorporated community in Virginia, United States

Coordinates: 36°51′52″N 82°54′00″W

Darnell Town is an unincorporated community in Lee County, Virginia, United States. It is part of the Keokee census-designated place.

== History ==
Darnell Town was named for Raleigh Darnell, who owned a store.
