= Jonesville, Virginia =

Town in southwest Virginia, US

- Town
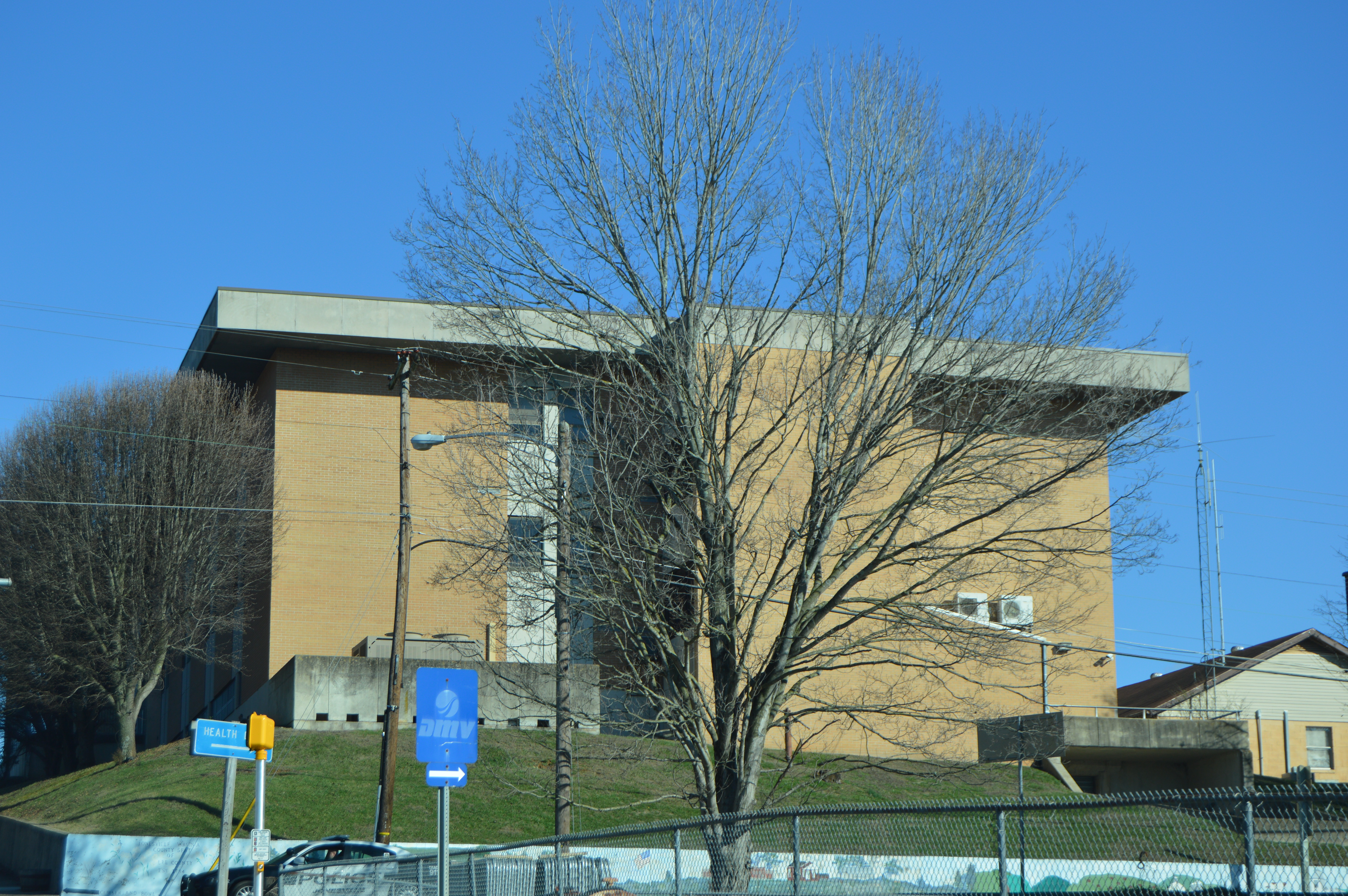
- Lee County Courthouse on Main Street

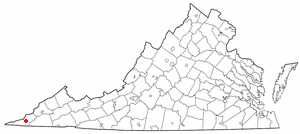
- Location in Virginia

- Location in the United States
- Coordinates: 36°41′17″N 83°6′59″W
- Country: United States
- State: Virginia
- County: Lee

Government
  - Mayor: Greg Smith

Area
  - Total: 1.11 sq mi (2.88 km^{2})
  - Land: 1.11 sq mi (2.88 km^{2})
  - Water: 0 sq mi (0.00 km^{2}) 0%
- Elevation: 1,503 ft (458 m)

Population (2020)
  - Total: 872
  - Density: 784.2/sq mi (302.78/km^{2})
- Time zone: UTC-5 (EST)
  - Summer (DST): UTC-4 (EDT)
- ZIP code: 24263
- Area code: 276
- FIPS code: 51-41272
- GNIS feature ID: 1498497
- Website: www.jonesvillevirginia.com

Jonesville is a town in and the county seat of Lee County, Virginia, United States. The population was 872 as of the 2020 census.

== History ==
Jonesville was a small but thriving center of local commerce in the late nineteenth and early twentieth centuries, but like most towns in the central Appalachian region, it fell into gradual economic decline as the coal boom ebbed in the latter half of the twentieth century. By the end of the century much of the commercial real estate in its downtown area was either unoccupied or underutilized. Most of Jonesville's remaining commercial activity is concentrated in the west end. Jonesville Drug, one of the oldest surviving downtown businesses, relocated to the old Chappell's Dairy site on the west end in 2004.

The Dickinson-Milbourn House and Jonesville Methodist Campground are listed on the National Register of Historic Places.

== Notable people ==
- Elbert S. Martin, congressman; born near Jonesville
- John Preston Martin, congressman, Kentucky state senator; born near Jonesville
- Andrew Taylor Still, M. D., D.O., father of osteopathic medicine and founder of its first school and infirmary; born in Jonesville in 1828
- Steve Rasnic Tem, author; born in Jonesville
- Glen Morgan Williams, federal judge; born in Jonesville

== Geography ==
Jonesville is located at 36°41′17″N 83°6′59″W (36.688012, -83.116305).

According to the United States Census Bureau, the town has a total area of 1.1 square miles (2.8 km^{2}), all land.

== Demographics ==
Historical population
Census	Pop.	Note	%±
1870	274		—
1910	383		—
1920	328		−14.4%
1930	384		17.1%
1940	588		53.1%
1950	597		1.5%
1960	711		19.1%
1970	700		−1.5%
1980	874		24.9%
1990	927		6.1%
2000	995		7.3%
2010	1,034		3.9%
2020	872		−15.7%
2025 (est.)	843	▼	−3.3%
U.S. Decennial Census

As of the census of 2000, there were 995 people, 497 households, and 261 families living in the town. The population density was 901.1 people per square mile (349.2/km^{2}). There were 565 housing units at an average density of 511.7 per square mile (198.3/km^{2}). The racial makeup of the town was 99.30% White, 0.10% African American, and 0.60% from two or more races. Hispanic or Latino of any race were 0.40% of the population.

There were 497 households, out of which 22.5% had children under the age of 18 living with them, 38.8% were married couples living together, 12.3% had a female householder with no husband present, and 47.3% were non-families. 45.1% of all households were made up of individuals, and 20.5% had someone living alone who was 65 years of age or older. The average household size was 1.91 and the average family size was 2.66.

In the town, the population was spread out, with 18.1% under the age of 18, 8.4% from 18 to 24, 24.7% from 25 to 44, 25.4% from 45 to 64, and 23.3% who were 65 years of age or older. The median age was 44 years. For every 100 females, there were 87.4 males. For every 100 females aged 18 and over, there were 85.6 males.

The median income for a household in the town in 2000 was $16,548, and the median income for a family was $27,368. Males had a median income in 2000 of $26,950 versus $19,297 for females. The per capita income for the town was $18,347. About 25.4% of families and 32.3% of the population were below the poverty line, including 55.6% of those under age 18 and 24.4% of those age 65 or over.

== Government and infrastructure ==
The Federal Bureau of Prisons United States Penitentiary, Lee is located 8 miles (13 km) east of Jonesville.
