= Speedwell, Tennessee =

Unincorporated community in Tennessee, US

Coordinates: 36°27′31″N 83°52′19″W

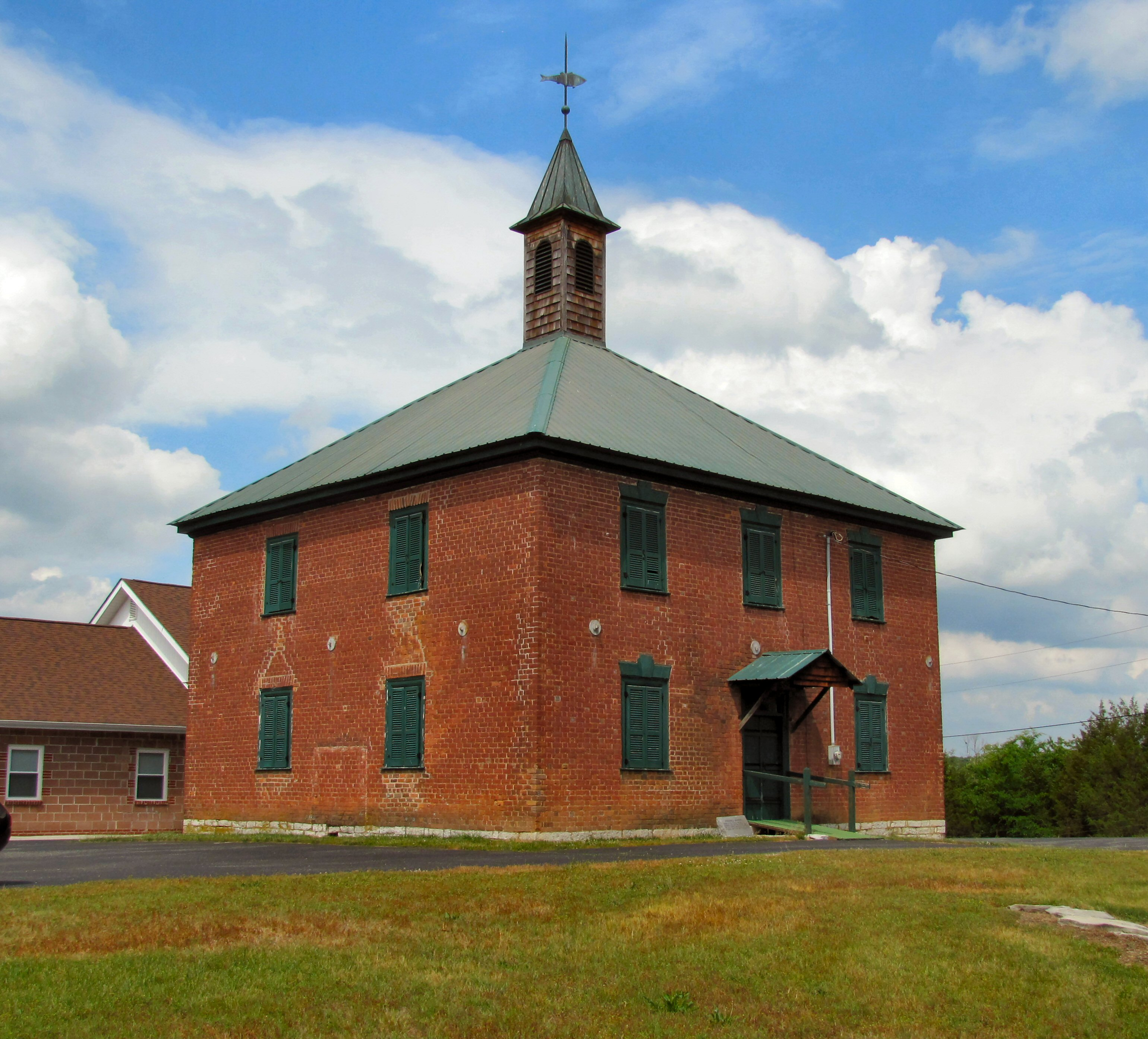
The old Speedwell Academy building in Speedwell

Speedwell is an unincorporated community in Claiborne County, Tennessee.

Speedwell is an agricultural community that was first settled c. 1790. It is the site of Powell Valley Elementary School, a Claiborne County public school for kindergarten through grade 8, and a post office that is assigned zip code 37870.

Tennessee State Route 63 runs through Speedwell

it is nestled through the Cumberland Mountains which is located in Northeastern Tennessee
