= Poor Fork =

Poor Fork may refer to:

- Cumberland, Kentucky, formerly named "Poor Fork"
- Poor Fork (Cumberland River)
