= Cumberland Central Business District =

Commercial district in Kentucky, US

- U.S. National Register of Historic Places
- U.S. Historic district
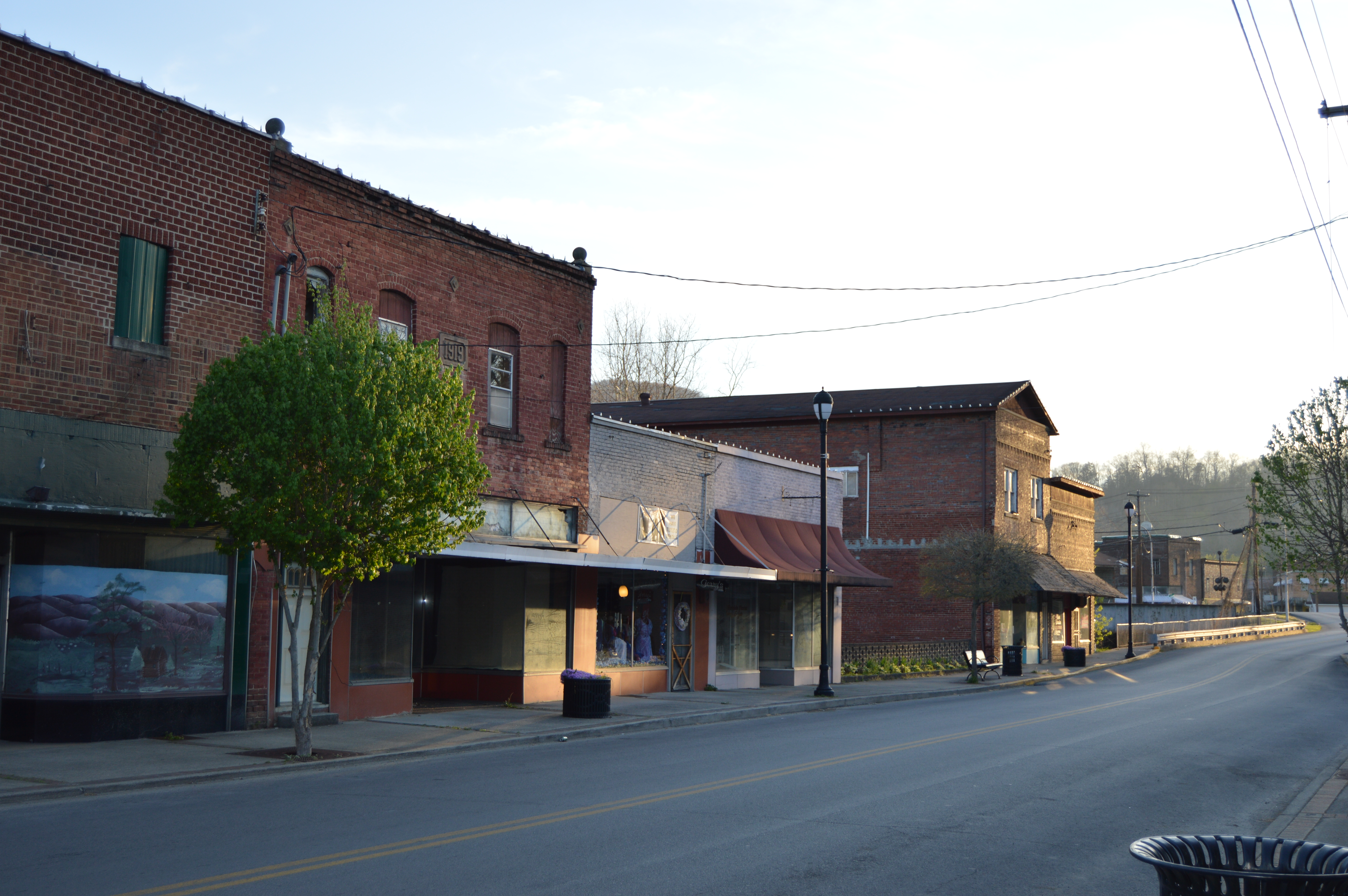
- Location: Roughly bounded by Freeman St., Huff Dr., the Poor Fork of the Cumberland R., Cumberland Ave. and W. Main St., Cumberland, Kentucky
- Coordinates: 36°58′31″N 82°59′27″W
- Area: 8 acres (3.2 ha)
- NRHP reference No.: 96000282
- Added to NRHP: March 14, 1996

The Cumberland Central Business District is a commercial historic district in downtown Cumberland, Kentucky. While Cumberland was first settled in the 1820s, the district was developed during the area's coal mining boom of the 1910s and 1920s, which came after the Louisville and Nashville Railroad built lines through the region. Two of the largest mines in Harlan County, at Benham and Lynch, were near Cumberland; Benham and Lynch were company towns, however, which made Cumberland the closest commercial center independent of the mining companies. During this period, downtown Cumberland added a bank, a theater, a bus station, and many restaurants and specialty shops. The local coal industry declined dramatically during the Great Depression, and many of Cumberland's businesses closed as mining companies and their employees left the region.

The district was added to the National Register of Historic Places on March 14, 1996.
