= Kingdom Come State Park =

State park in Kentucky, United States

- Location within Kentucky Location within the United States
- Type: Kentucky state park
- Location: Harlan County, Kentucky
- Coordinates: 36°59′48″N 82°58′44″W
- Area: 1,283 acres (519 ha)
- Created: June 11, 1961
- Operator: Kentucky Department of Parks
- Status: Open year-round
- Website: Official website

Kingdom Come State Park is a part of Kentucky's state park system in Harlan County atop Pine Mountain near the city of Cumberland. It was named after the 1903 best-selling novel The Little Shepherd of Kingdom Come by native Kentuckian John Fox, Jr. Features of the park include Raven Rock, Log Rock, and a 3.5-acre (1.4 ha) mountain lake. The section of the park is also a legally dedicated state nature preserve by the Office of Kentucky Nature Preserves.

== Park features ==
=== Natural formations ===
Raven Rock is a naturally bare, large rock face composed mostly of limestone, leaning at a 45° angle over 290 feet (88 m) in the air. Nearby is the Cave Amphitheater. In the back of the Cave Amphitheater are deep crevices that house thousands of bats. Also within the park is a natural sandstone bridge called "Log Rock", which resembles a petrified tree that has fallen over. The Log Rock has been severely vandalized over the years, and the underside is now covered with people's names that they have spray-painted or scratched onto the stone. There are also numerous overlooks to the valleys below. Among the most popular of these viewing points is the Creech Overlook.

=== Wildlife ===
Within the park is a 225-acre nature preserve, primarily to protect the federally designated as endangered Indiana bat species. The preserve's Line Fork Cave is the winter roosting site for more than 3,000 Indiana bats. The park has the third largest colony of these bats in the state of Kentucky.

Black bears inhabit Kingdom Come State Park and adjoining lands in the Cumberland, Kentucky area. Black bears naturally recolonized extreme eastern Kentucky counties (Harlan, Letcher, Bell, and Pike) over the last three decades from the neighboring states of Virginia, West Virginia, and Tennessee. The species was not reintroduced to Kingdom Come State Park or any portion of Kentucky east of Interstate 75. It is illegal to feed black bears.

Other wildlife species also call Kingdom Come State Park home, including the state-threatened common raven, fox, multiple species of hawks, cottontail rabbit, multiple bat species, coyote, multiple species of amphibians, and an array of insect life.

=== Activities and amenities ===
Fourteen hiking trails, a 9-hole miniature golf course, lake with paddle boats, picnic shelters, fishing, and primitive campsites are available at the park. The park offers access to Little Shepherd Trail, a 38-mile (61 km) primitive road for mountain biking and adventure driving that winds across the Pine Mountain ridgetop to the city of Harlan.

=== Nearby ===
The Kentucky Coal Mining Museum, Portal 31 Mine Tour, and Benham Schoolhouse Inn are operated by the Kentucky Community and Technical College System in Benham.
