= List of city nicknames in Kentucky =

This partial list of city nicknames in Kentucky compiles the aliases, sobriquets and slogans that cities and towns in Kentucky are known by (or have been known by historically), officially and unofficially, to municipal governments, local people, outsiders or their tourism boards or chambers of commerce. City nicknames can help in establishing a civic identity, helping outsiders recognize a community or attracting people to a community because of its nickname; promote civic pride; and build community unity. Nicknames and slogans that successfully create a new community "ideology or myth" are also believed to have economic value. Their economic value is difficult to measure, but there are anecdotal reports of cities that have achieved substantial economic benefits by "branding" themselves by adopting new slogans.

Some unofficial nicknames are positive, while others are derisive. The unofficial nicknames listed here have been in use for a long time or have gained wide currency.

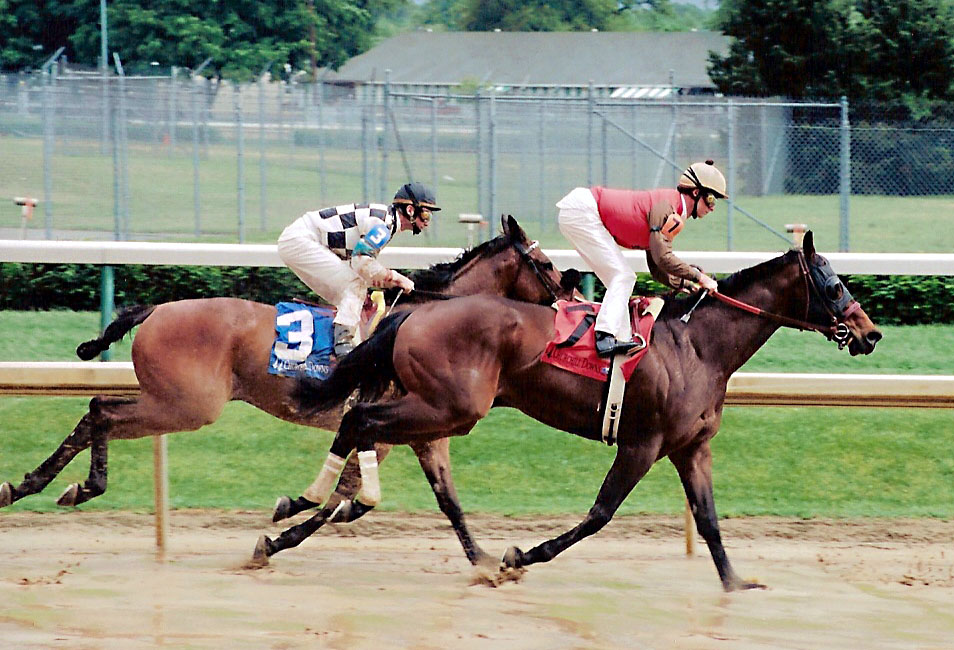
Nicknames for Lexington and Louisville celebrate the Bluegrass Region's horse farms and the state's most famous horse race, the Kentucky Derby, held at Churchill Downs in Louisville.

- Bardstown – Bourbon Capital of the World
- Bellevue – B-town
- Benham – The Little Town That International Harvester, Coal Miners, and Their Families Built
- Berea – Folk Arts and Crafts Capital of Kentucky
- Bowling Green
  - Vette City
  - The Park City
- Burnside – The Only Town on Lake Cumberland
- Cave City – Gateway to Mammoth Cave
- Covington – Gateway to the South
- Crestwood – Whiskers
- Cumberland – Black Bear Capital of Kentucky
- Danville – City of Firsts
- Elizabethtown – E Town
- Elkhorn City – Gateway to the Breaks
- Fort Mitchell - Titletown
- Fort Thomas – The City of Beautiful Homes
- Grayson – Heart of the Parks
- Hazard – Queen City of the Mountains
- Hopkinsville – Hoptown
- Hyden – Redbud Capital of the World
- Lexington
  - Athens of the West
  - Horse Capital of the World
- Louisville
  - City of Beautiful Churches
  - Derby City
  - The Fall City (reported in the 1880s) or Falls City
  - Gateway to the South
  - River City
  - The Ville
- Madisonville – Best Town on Earth
- Manchester – City of Hope
- Mayfield – Pearl of the Purchase
- Middlesboro
  - The Athens of the Mountains
  - The City Built Inside a Meteorite Crater
  - Crater City
  - Little Las Vegas
  - The Magic City
- Monticello – Houseboat Capital of the World
- Mount Sterling – Gateway Between the Bluegrass and the Mountains
- Owensboro – Barbecued Mutton Capital of the World
- Paducah – Quilt City
- Paintsville – The City Between the Lakes
- Paris – Thoroughbred Capital of the World
- Pikeville – The City That Moves Mountains
- Prestonsburg – The Star City of Eastern Kentucky
- Renfro Valley – Kentucky's Country Music Capital
- Shelbyville – The Gateway to the Bluegrass
- Simpsonville – American Saddlebred Capital of the World
- Somerset
  - Car Cruise Capital of Kentucky
  - Spirit of Southern Kentucky
- Williamsburg – Your Gateway to the Cumberlands

== See also ==
- List of city nicknames in the United States
- List of cities in Kentucky
