= Pine Mountain State Scenic Trail =

Hiking trail in Kentucky, United States

Coordinates: 37.2034396°N 82.552376°W

- Length: 120 mi (190 km)
- Location: Eastern Kentucky, United States
- Trailheads: Breaks Interstate Park, Kentucky; Cumberland Gap National Historical Park, Kentucky
- Use: Hiking
- Difficulty: Moderate to Difficult
- Sights: Cumberland Plateau
- Hazards: Severe weather American black bear Tick-borne diseases Mosquitos; Biting flies Chiggers; Steep grades Limited water Diarrhea from water Poison ivy Venomous snakes

Pine Mountain State Scenic Trail is a 120 mi (193 km) trail under development in the U.S. state of Kentucky. Once completed, the trail will wind along Pine Mountain Ridge from the Breaks Interstate Park to Cumberland Gap National Historical Park. The park itself will cover a 1,000 acres (4.0 km^{2}) band along Pine Mountain. The trail will connect Bad Branch State Nature Preserve and many other natural areas owned by the Office of Kentucky Nature Preserves.

As of May 2014, the trail is completed from the Breaks Interstate Park to Kingdom Come State Park.

== Trail sections ==
The following chart lists the completed trail sections as of May 2014:

Trail Section	Length	Shelters	Start to Finish
Birch Knob	28 mi (45 km)	one	Breaks Interstate Park to U.S. 23
Highland Section	16 mi (26 km)	two	U.S. 23 to U.S. 119

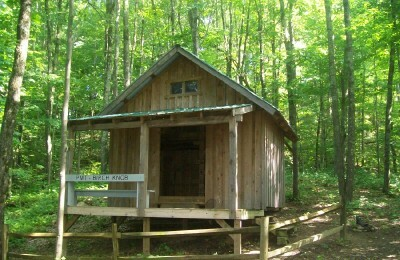
Birch Knob Shelter on the Pine Mountain State Scenic Trail

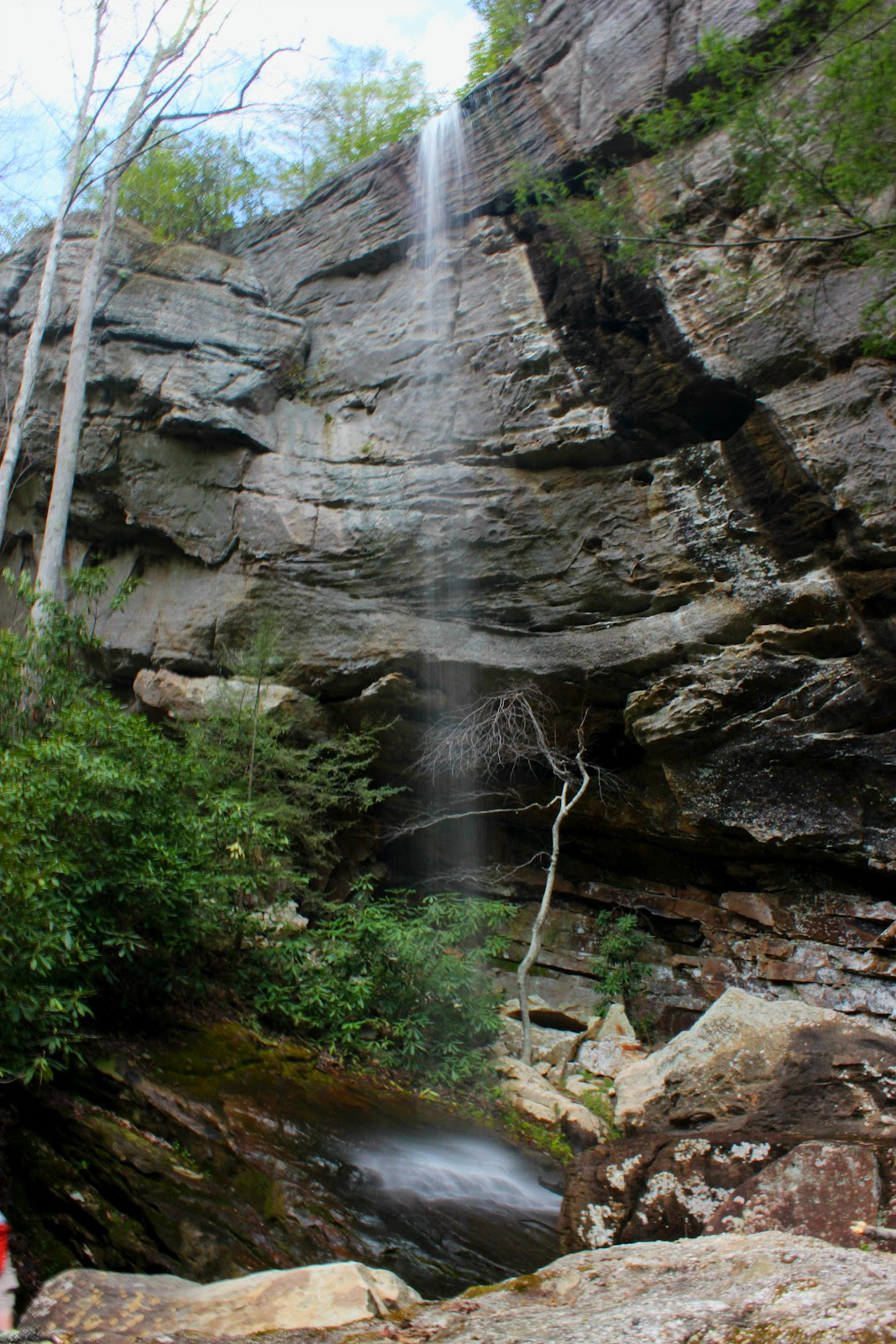
The falls via a spur trail of the Pine Mountain Trail near the Birch Knob shelter

== Trail rules ==
- Foot traffic only between US 23 and US 119
- Camping at designated sites only (There are a number of shelters along the trail - check for details on camping.)
- No overnight camping permitted in state nature preserves.
- No overnight parking at state nature preserves.
- Trails have sign-in and sign-out stations that help identify who is and has been on the mountain in the event of an emergency.
