= Jenkins School (Jenkins, Kentucky) =

- U.S. National Register of Historic Places
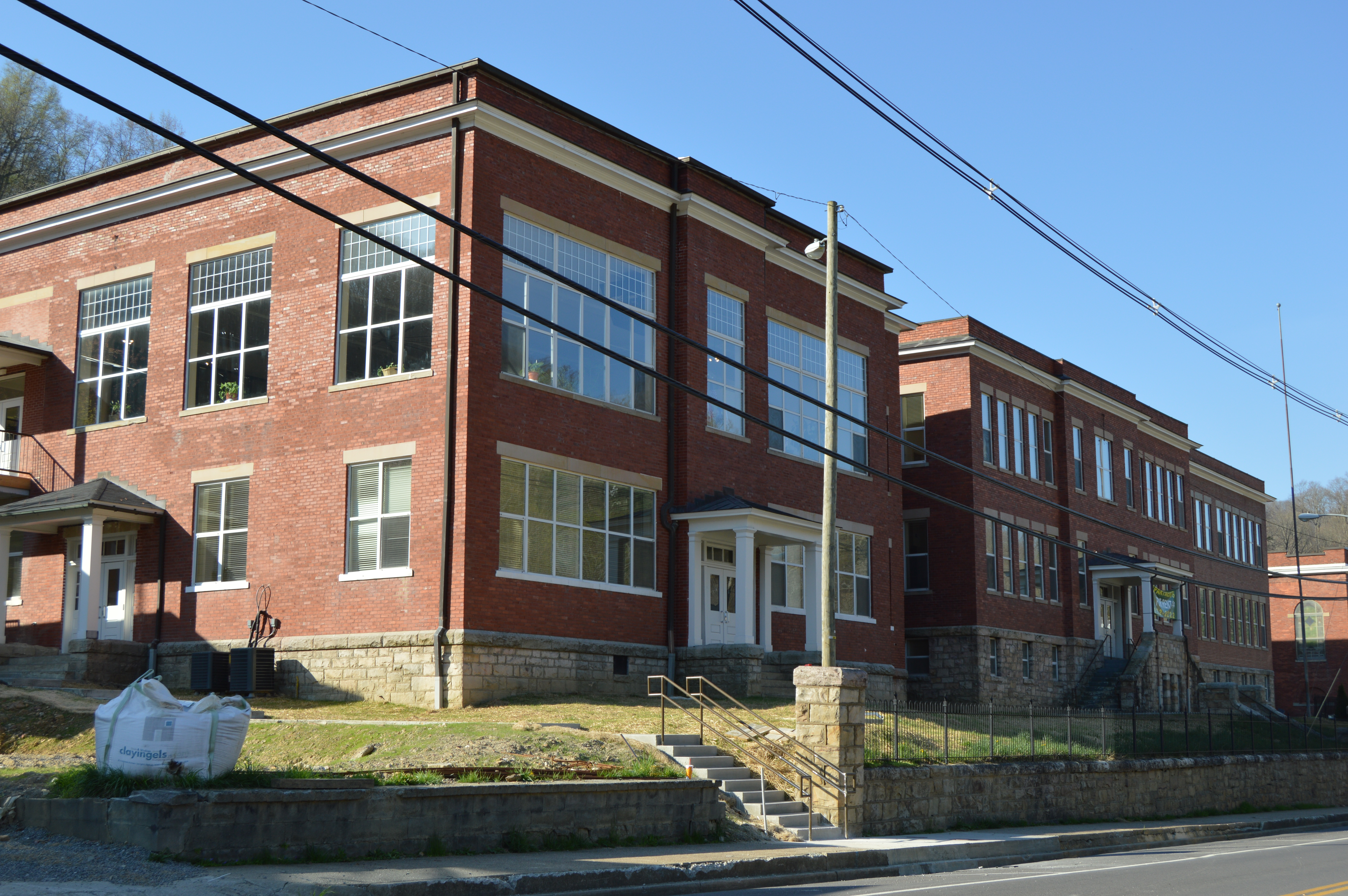
- Location: 75 Pane St., Jenkins, Kentucky
- Coordinates: 37°10′21″N 82°37′56″W
- Built: 1912
- NRHP reference No.: 11000004
- Added to NRHP: February 11, 2011

Jenkins School, at 75 Pane St. in Jenkins, Kentucky, was listed on the National Register of Historic Places in 2011.

It was deemed notable "as the largest and finest school to be produced as part of the efforts by Consolidation Coal Company to develop Jenkins, a coal camp, in the coal rich mountains of eastern Kentucky. Jenkins School’s construction in 1912 heralded a dramatic period of coal investment in Jenkins, leading the town to be considered one of the crown jewels of coal towns—Consolidation Coal Company would bring politicians and visitors from all around the United States and abroad to see their accomplishments in this Letcher County settlement. As other Jenkins buildings of this period have been lost to neglect or demolition, Jenkins School and its level of preservation remains as a touchstone to the community’s coal industry heritage."

The school was redeveloped into 26 affordable apartments for senior citizens, and a senior citizens center, in a project completed in 2014.
