= Cumberland, Kentucky =

City in Kentucky, United States

- City
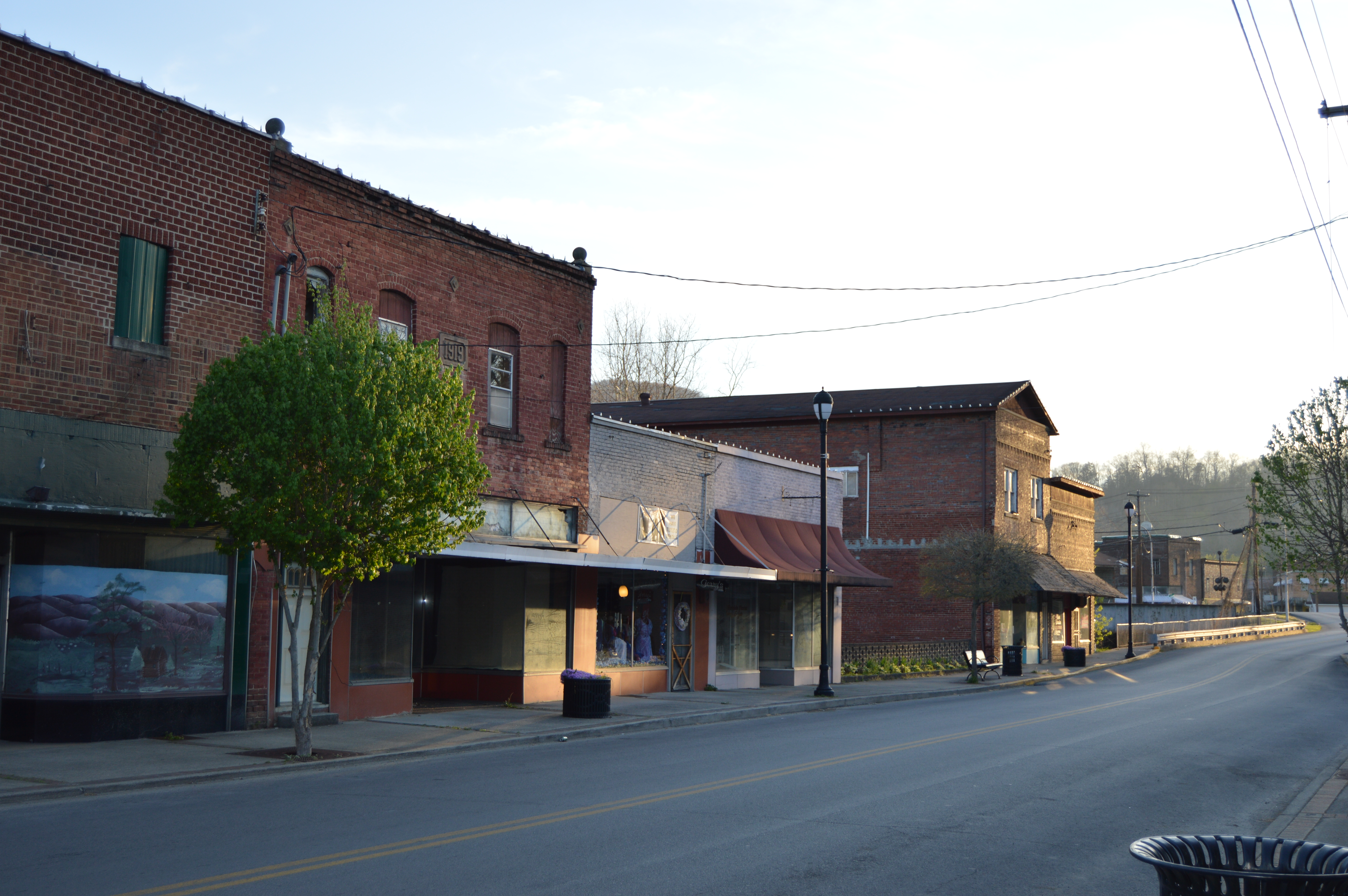
- Main Street downtown
- Nicknames: Black Bear Capital of Kentucky
- Location of Cumberland in Harlan County, Kentucky.
- Coordinates: 36°58′37″N 82°59′15″W
- Country: United States
- State: Kentucky
- County: Harlan

Area
  - Total: 3.15 sq mi (8.15 km^{2})
  - Land: 3.12 sq mi (8.07 km^{2})
  - Water: 0.031 sq mi (0.08 km^{2})
- Elevation: 1,440 ft (440 m)

Population (2020)
  - Total: 1,947
  - Estimate (2022): 1,845
  - Density: 625.1/sq mi (241.34/km^{2})
- Time zone: UTC-5 (Eastern (EST))
  - Summer (DST): UTC-4 (EDT)
- ZIP code: 40823
- Area code: 606
- FIPS code: 21-19108
- GNIS feature ID: 0511673
- Website: cumberlandky.us

Cumberland is a home rule-class city in Harlan County, Kentucky, in the United States. As of the 2020 census, Cumberland had a population of 1,947. The city sits at the confluence of Looney Creek and the Poor Fork Cumberland River.

== History ==
Cumberland was settled in 1837 and named "Poor Fork", for its location on a fork of the Cumberland River with relatively poor soil. It remained isolated until the coal mining boom of the 1900s when railroads connected it with surrounding towns. It was renamed "Cumberland" in 1926.

On July 29, 2019, a group of coal miners blocked a coal train on a track in protest when the company they worked for, Blackjewel LLC, refused to pay them after declaring bankruptcy. Blackjewel was founded in 2017, and it was one of the largest coal mining companies in the country. Its bankruptcy filing also affected employees in Virginia and Wyoming; in total about 1700 miners have been affected. The miners called off the protest in late September 2019, mostly because they have found other jobs. They intend to continue their fight in court.

== Geography ==
Cumberland is located in northeastern Harlan County at 36°58′37″N 82°59′15″W (36.977016, -82.987434) in the valley of the Poor Fork of the Cumberland River, where it is joined by Looney Creek from the southeast and Cloverlick Creek from the south. The city limits extend to the north up to the crest of Pine Mountain, which forms the Letcher County line. Elevations within the city range from 1,400 feet (430 m) above sea level along the Poor Fork on the west side of town to 2,700 feet (820 m) atop Pine Mountain.

U.S. Route 119 passes through Cumberland, passing south of the city center. US 119 leads northeast 34 miles (55 km) to Jenkins and southwest 22 miles (35 km) to Harlan, the Harlan County seat. Kentucky Route 160 passes through the center of Cumberland, leading southeast 2.5 miles (4.0 km) to Benham and 12 miles (19 km) to the Virginia border, and north over Pine Mountain 5 miles (8 km) to Gordon.

According to the United States Census Bureau, the city of Cumberland has a total area of 3.1 square miles (8.1 km^{2}), of which 0.03 square miles (0.08 km^{2}), or 0.95%, are water.

=== Climate ===
The climate in this area is characterized by hot, humid summers and generally mild to cool winters. According to the Köppen Climate Classification system, Cumberland has a humid subtropical climate, abbreviated "Cfa" on climate maps.

== Demographics ==
Historical population
Census	Pop.	Note	%±
1920	300		—
1930	2,639		779.7%
1940	4,149		57.2%
1950	4,249		2.4%
1960	4,271		0.5%
1970	3,380		−20.9%
1980	3,712		9.8%
1990	3,112		−16.2%
2000	2,611		−16.1%
2010	2,237		−14.3%
2020	1,947		−13.0%
2022 (est.)	1,845		−5.2%
U.S. Decennial Census

=== 2020 census ===
As of the 2020 census, Cumberland had a population of 1,947. The median age was 42.1 years. 21.9% of residents were under the age of 18 and 21.7% of residents were 65 years of age or older. For every 100 females there were 93.0 males, and for every 100 females age 18 and over there were 86.5 males age 18 and over.

0.0% of residents lived in urban areas, while 100.0% lived in rural areas.

There were 822 households in Cumberland, of which 29.4% had children under the age of 18 living in them. Of all households, 36.0% were married-couple households, 21.0% were households with a male householder and no spouse or partner present, and 37.0% were households with a female householder and no spouse or partner present. About 32.8% of all households were made up of individuals and 14.1% had someone living alone who was 65 years of age or older.

There were 1,004 housing units, of which 18.1% were vacant. The homeowner vacancy rate was 2.6% and the rental vacancy rate was 12.5%.

Racial composition as of the 2020 census
Race	Number	Percent
White	1,736	89.2%
Black or African American	96	4.9%
American Indian and Alaska Native	5	0.3%
Asian	10	0.5%
Native Hawaiian and Other Pacific Islander	0	0.0%
Some other race	17	0.9%
Two or more races	83	4.3%
Hispanic or Latino (of any race)	21	1.1%

=== 2000 census ===
As of the 2000 census, there were 2,611 people, 1,076 households, and 723 families residing in the city. The population density was 570.5 inhabitants per square mile (220.3/km^{2}). There were 1,288 housing units at an average density of 281.4 per square mile (108.6/km^{2}). The racial makeup of the city was 93.60% White, 5.09% African American, 0.50% Native American, 0.04% Asian, 0.04% from other races, and 0.73% from two or more races. Hispanic or Latino of any race were 0.84% of the population.

There were 1,076 households, out of which 31.4% had children under the age of 18 living with them, 46.7% were married couples living together, 16.8% had a female householder with no husband present, and 32.8% were non-families. 31.0% of all households were made up of individuals, and 14.1% had someone living alone who was 65 years of age or older. The average household size was 2.35 and the average family size was 2.95.

In the city, the population was spread out, with 25.5% under the age of 18, 9.2% from 18 to 24, 25.5% from 25 to 44, 22.1% from 45 to 64, and 17.7% who were 65 years of age or older. The median age was 38 years. For every 100 females, there were 87.7 males. For every 100 females age 18 and over, there were 82.6 males.

The median income for a household in the city was $15,929, and the median income for a family was $22,365. Males had a median income of $34,327 versus $13,750 for females. The per capita income for the city was $9,835. About 31.5% of families and 38.7% of the population were below the poverty line, including 56.3% of those under age 18 and 19.5% of those age 65 or over.

== Education ==
Cumberland is home to the main campus of Southeast Kentucky Community and Technical College, part of the Kentucky Community and Technical College System.

Cumberland has a lending library, a branch of the Harlan County Public Library.

== Arts and culture ==
Cumberland is home to Kingdom Come State Park, which features a lake, gift shop, camp sites, miniature golf, paddle boating, picnic facilities, primitive camping, hiking trails, and an amphitheatre. The park is home to natural rock formations including Raven Rock and Log Rock. Two overlooks in the park provide scenic views of the Appalachian Mountains.

Cumberland is home to the annual Kingdom Come Swappin' Meetin', a festival honoring Appalachian history, folklore, and products. The festival is held on the campus of Southeast Kentucky Community and Technical College in Cumberland. The festival includes live demonstrations of Appalachian methods and traditions. The most recent festival is the annual Black Bear Festival, in honor of the popular black bears at Kingdom Come State Park.

== See also ==
- Cumberland Central Business District
