= Looney Creek (Poor Fork tributary) =

Stream in Kentucky, United States

Coordinates: 36.9786438°N 82.9884696°W

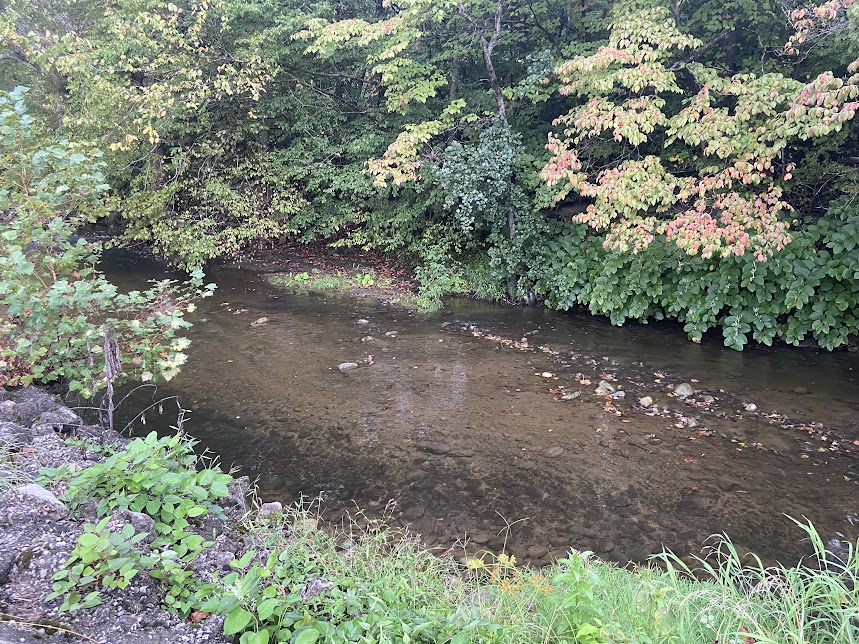
Looney Creek in Cumberland, Kentucky

Looney Creek is a stream in Harlan County, Kentucky, United States. The creek flows from its source at Black Mountain on the Kentucky-Virginia border, through the cities of Benham and Lynch to its confluence with the Poor Fork in Cumberland, Kentucky.

There are two ways the creek may have gotten its name. According to Green Cornett, a settler from the area, there was a man named Looney who was chased up and down the creek by Native Americans, but according to Ina Mae Enzor, Looney cleared a corn patch near the creek.
