= Diana Baldwin =

American coal miner

- Born: August 31, 1948; Letcher County, Kentucky, US
- Died: May 28, 2016 (aged 67); South Carolina, US
- Spouses: James Roger Gibbs; William Christian
- Children: 3

Diana Baldwin (1948–2016) was one of the first female coal miners in the United States. She and Anita Cherry, hired as miners in 1973, are believed to have been the first women to work in an underground coal mine in the United States, breaking down social barriers, in a field which had been male only. They were also the first female members of United Mine Workers of America to work inside a mine.

== Legal barriers ==
Before 1965 it was difficult for women to be employed by coal companies. In 1965 President Lyndon B. Johnson signed the Equal Opportunity executive order 11246, which meant that coal companies which had contracts with the federal government could not prevent employment on the basis of sex or race. Despite this it wasn't until the Equal Employment Opportunity Act of 1972 was signed into law by President Richard Nixon, that women could make inroads at coal companies.

== Personal life ==
Baldwin was born on August 31, 1948, to Lelar Baldwin, in Letcher County, Kentucky. She first worked as a waitress, then as receptionist at a medical clinic. During that time, Diana had 3 children - Lori, born in 1966, Scott, who lived 1968 – 2022, and Mark, born in 1970. Later she married James Roger Gibbs (m. 1982 – 1991). Baldwin moved to South Carolina in 1992 where she received her Commercial driver's license and became an on-the-road truck driver. She met William Christian, a truck driver as well. They were married from 1994 to 2002.

== Coal mining career ==
In 1973, Baldwin (aged 29) was a single mother of 3 children and decided that she needed a better-paying job than what she was earning as a receptionist. Coal mines paid double what she was earning and she decided to apply for a job despite the increased risks of women in a coal mine. She found a job at a coal mine operated by the Beth-Elkhorn Coal Company in Jenkins, Kentucky.

With her dedication to the job she quickly gained skills as a miner.

Over the years, Baldwin worked in various positions, from operating heavy machinery to conducting safety inspections. One of the pivotal moments in her career occurred when she was assigned to operate one of the mine's most complex machines. Despite initial doubts from her male colleagues, her skillful handling of the equipment led to a record-breaking production day, silencing critics and earning her the respect of even the most seasoned miners.

Soon after, she was gained national attention as a woman coal miner. Walter Cronkite did a story on Baldwin in 1973. She also appeared on the show What's My Line?. She was interviewed by The New York Times in May 1974. Before retirement, Baldwin became a Mine Boss then Assistant Federal Mine Inspector.

She has been recognized as a “trailblazer” in the mining industry.

== Death ==
Baldwin died of lupus in South Carolina on May 28, 2016, at the age of 67.
