= Lynch Historic District =

Historic district in Kentucky, United States

- U.S. National Register of Historic Places
- U.S. Historic district
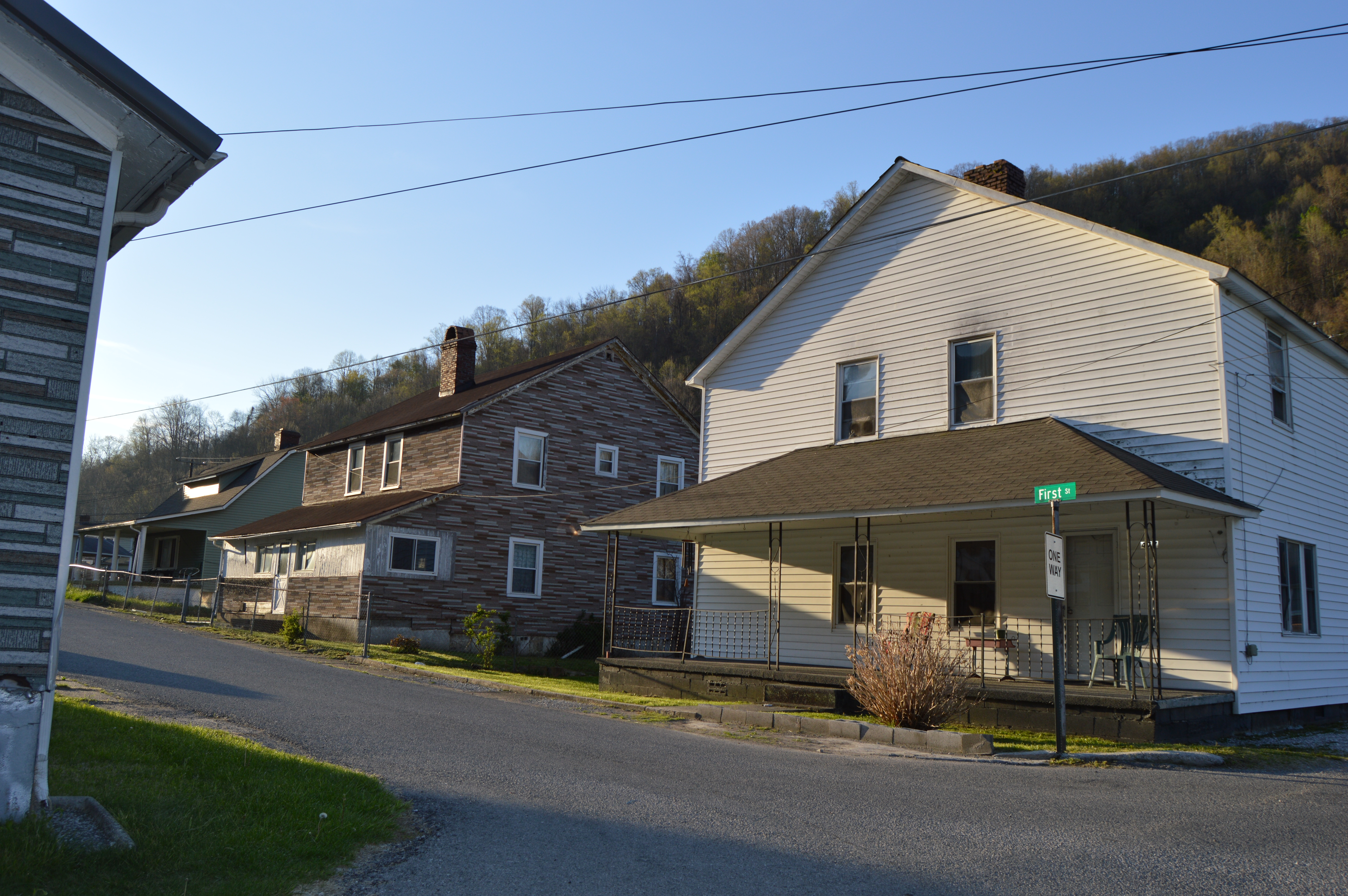

- Location within Kentucky Location within the United States
- Location: Roughly bounded by city limits, L&N RR bed, Big Looney Cr., Second, Mountain, Highland Terrace, Liberty, and Church Sts., Lynch, Kentucky
- Coordinates: 36°57′52″N 82°55′04″W
- Area: 125 acres (51 ha)
- Architectural style: Colonial Revival, Bungalow/craftsman
- NRHP reference No.: 03000086
- Added to NRHP: September 15, 2003

The Lynch Historic District, in Lynch, Kentucky, is a 125 acres (51 ha) historic district which was listed on the National Register of Historic Places in 2003. It included 298 contributing buildings, four contributing structures, and a contributing site.

The district is roughly bounded by city limits, L&N railroad bed, Big Looney Cr., Second, Mountain, Highland Terrace, Liberty, and Church Streets.

Lynch was the largest company-owned coal mining town in Kentucky and was established by U.S. Coal and Coke Company, a subsidiary of U.S. Steel.
