= Poor Fork (Cumberland River tributary) =

Tributary of the Cumberland river in Kentucky

Coordinates: 36.85981°N 83.32574°W

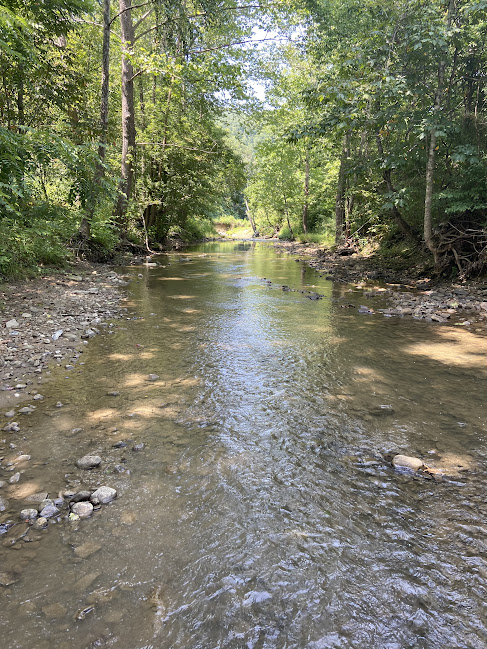
- The Poor Fork near the community of Eolia in Letcher County

Physical characteristics
- Mouth
  - elevation: 1,148 ft (350 m)
- Length: 45 mi (72 km)
- Discharge
  - location: Cumberland, Kentucky
  - average: 147 cu/ft. per sec.

Basin features
- Progression: Cumberland–Ohio–Mississippi
- Tributaries
  - right: Looney Creek

The Poor Fork is a 45-mile (72 km) tributary of the Cumberland River in Letcher and Harlan Counties, southeast Kentucky, in the United States. The river flows from its source at Flat Gap in Letcher County, on the Kentucky–Virginia border, generally southwest to where it meets Martin's Fork in Baxter to form the Cumberland River.

== See also ==
- Clover Fork
- Martin's Fork
- List of rivers of Kentucky
