= Kentucky Coal Museum =

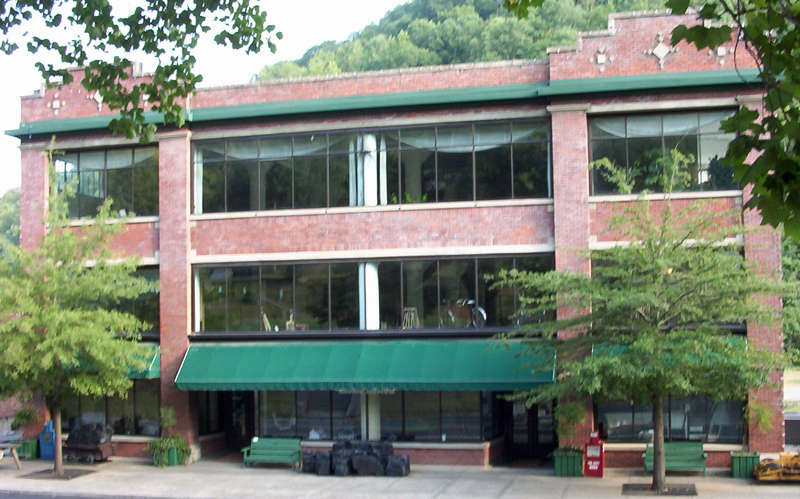

- Location within Kentucky Location within the United States
- Established: May 1994
- Location: 231 Main Street; Benham, Kentucky 40807
- Coordinates: 36.964081°N 82.951130°W
- Type: Heritage center
- Visitors: 30,000 (approx.)
- Director: Johnny Coppinger
- Curator: Phyllis Sizemore
- Owners: Southeastern Kentucky Community and Technical College
- Website: Website

- Benham Company Store
- U.S. National Register of Historic Places
- U.S. Historic district – Contributing property
- Built: 1923
- Part of: Benham Historic District
- NRHP reference No.: 83002785
- Added to NRHP: July 21, 1983

The Kentucky Coal Museum is a heritage center located in Benham, Kentucky. Its focus is the history of the coal industry in Eastern Kentucky, featuring specific exhibits on the company towns of Benham and neighboring Lynch. It is housed in a former company store that was built by International Harvester in 1923. In June 1990, the Tri-City Chamber of Commerce purchased the building for the future site of the museum. After receiving additional grants from the state of Kentucky, the museum opened in May 1994.

== Building ==
Built in the 1920s by International Harvester, the museum features four stories of exhibits on the mining history and the coal miner's life. It is a contributing building to the Benham Historic District, which is on the National Register of Historic Places.

In April 2017 the Kentucky Coal Museum added 80 solar panels which cut $8,000 off its annual electricity bill. The Southeastern Kentucky Community and Technical College own the Kentucky Coal Museum and thanks to them they paid for the installation of the solar panels. The solar panels for the museum now generate 60 kilowatts of power at maximum capacity.

== Education ==
The museum provides education on the life of coal miners and the pressures they faced while working in dangerous underground mines. The museum has over 6,000 visitors each year.

In early January, recent issues have caught the attention of residents of Benham and Lynch located in Harlan County about surface mining close to these historical towns. This could damage water sources and block the view of the city which helps tourism, which in turn could affect the Kentucky Coal Museum due to a decrease in tourism investments.

== Exhibits ==
Museum visitors have access to exhibits and displays on four floors. Some include the Mock Mine, life of a coal miner and their family, community art mural of Benham, mining tools, Native American & early settler displays, coal camp displays, coal camp schools, coal camps as multicultural places, mine safety exhibits, and the Loretta Lynn Exhibit. Artifacts, antiques, photographs, and machinery make up more than 30 exhibits in the museum.

One of the most well known tours is the Portal 31 Underground Mine Tour. This tour allows visitors to ride a rail car through a coal mine that include sounds and animated exhibits. Other activities for visitors include having their picture taken outside by the two-ton block of coal and learning about the formation of coal by looking at visuals and fossil displays.

== See also ==
- Coal Miners' Museum
- David A. Zegeer Coal-Railroad Museum
