= Leland Byrd =

American basketball player, coach, and college athletics administrator (1927–2022)

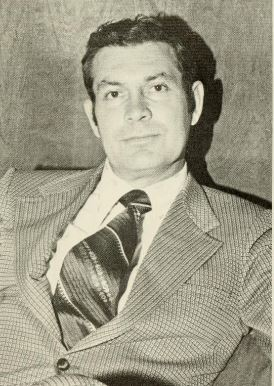
- Byrd from the 1973 Monticola.

Biographical details
- Born: April 8, 1927; Lynch, Kentucky, U.S.
- Died: January 19, 2022 (aged 94); Morgantown, West Virginia, U.S.

Playing career
- 1944–1948: West Virginia

Coaching career (HC unless noted)
- 1953–1955: Hinton HS
- 1955–1966: Glenville State

Administrative career (AD unless noted)
- 1962–1966: Glenville State
- 1966–1969: Miami Dade North Campus (assistant AD)
- 1969–1972: Miami Dade South Campus
- 1972–1978: West Virginia
- 1979–1984: Atlantic 10 Conference (Exec. Dir.)
- 1984–1992: Western Michigan

Accomplishments and honors

Awards
- First-team All-American – Helms (1947)

Leland E. Byrd (April 8, 1927 – January 19, 2022) was an American college athletic administrator, basketball player and coach. He was an All-American player at West Virginia University (WVU) and went on to serve as athletic director at several universities.

Byrd was born in Lynch, Kentucky, on April 8, 1927, and grew up in Matoaka, West Virginia. He played high school basketball for his father at Matoaka High School. Byrd enrolled at WVU in 1944, and because of a shortage of players due to World War II he was able to play as a freshman. Byrd enjoyed a four-year college career for the Mountaineers, coming into his own under the legendary coach Lee Patton, then earning All-America honors from the Helms Athletic Foundation as a junior in 1947. Following his graduation in 1948, he was drafted by the New York Knicks in the 1948 BAA draft, though he did not play for the team. Byrd was drafted into the United States Army and was eventually commissioned a first lieutenant.

His first coaching job came at Hinton High School in his native West Virginia. From there he was hired as head basketball coach at Glenville State College and was named the school's athletic director in 1962. He then moved to a teaching position at Miami Dade College's north campus, which was quickly expanded to include assistant athletic director duties. Three years later, he was named athletic director of the school's south campus. In 1972 he was named athletic director at his alma mater WVU, replacing Red Brown. In 1979, Byrd was named as Executive Director of the Eastern Eight Conference (which became the Atlantic 10 Conference during his tenure). Byrd then became athletic director at Western Michigan where he served from 1984 to 1992.

Byrd is a member of the WVU and Glenville State athletic halls of fame. He died on January 19, 2022, at the age of 94.
