= Anita Cherry =

American coal miner

Anita Cherry was an American practical nurse and coal miner. She and Diana Baldwin, hired as miners in 1973, are believed to have been the first women to work in an underground coal mine in the United States. They were the first female members of United Mine Workers of America to work inside a mine.

Cherry and Baldwin were hired by the Beth-Elkhorn Coal Company in Jenkins, Kentucky.
