= Clover Fork (Cumberland River tributary) =

River in Kentucky, United States

Coordinates: 36°50′42″N 83°19′27″W

Physical characteristics
- Mouth
  - elevation: 1,158 ft (353 m)
- Length: 30 mi (48 km)
- Basin size: 222 mi^{2} (570 km^{2})
- Discharge
  - location: Harlan, Kentucky
  - average: 395 cu ft/s (11.2 m^{3}/s)

Basin features
- Progression: Cumberland—Ohio—Mississippi

The Clover Fork is a 30-mile (48 km) tributary of the Cumberland River, draining a section of the Appalachian Mountains in Harlan County, southeast Kentucky in the United States. The river's confluence with the Martin's Fork at Harlan marks the official beginning of the Cumberland River.

The Clover Fork formerly flowed through Harlan and joined Martin's Fork on the west side of town. Due to recurring flood damage, a project of the U.S. Army Corps of Engineers diverted the river through four approximately 1,936-foot-long (590 m) tunnels to bypass the city to the north. The diversion project was completed in 1989.

== See also ==
- List of rivers of Kentucky
