= Southeast Kentucky floods of 2020 =

Major flooding inundated Southeast Kentucky from February 6–7, 2020, as the result of an extremely heavy rain event.

Twenty one counties in Eastern Kentucky sustained flood damage, and Kentucky Governor Andy Beshear declared a state of emergency on February 8, for Bell, Clay, Harlan, Knox, Leslie, Letcher, Perry and Whitley Counties.

== Flooding timeline ==
Beginning on February 3, numerous rounds of rainfall began to impact eastern Kentucky. This continued through February 7, highlighted by heavy rainfall from the evening of February 5 through the first half of February 6th. Rain amounts of 4–6 inches (100–150 mm) fell across much of southeastern Kentucky over this period. This led to major flooding and numerous mudslides across portions of Whitley, Perry, Letcher, Leslie, Knox, Harlan, Clay, and Bell Counties. The Governor subsequently declared a State of Emergency for these 8 counties.

Major flooding occurred along the Cumberland River at Pineville, Barbourville, and Williamsburg. Additionally, the communities of Loyall and Baxter experienced major flooding. Numerous roads became impassable across large portions of Whitley, Knox, Clay, Leslie, Letcher, Harlan, Perry, and Bell counties. In particular, Harlan County was hit extremely hard with the Kentucky Mesonet site on Black Mountain (4031 foot elevation) receiving over 6.5 inches (170 mm) of rain over this stretch.

Flood gates were closed in Pineville and Harlan, further impacting local travel. A couple of mobile homes were flooded and swept down the Cumberland River in Harlan County, while swift water rescues took place in Bell and Harlan Counties. Elkhorn Dam in Jenkins had water rushing over it for a period of time on February 6. A man went missing in Whitley County and was later found deceased in his car on Kentucky Highway 779 after his attempt to drive into flood waters. A total of seven homes were reported to have been in or under water across Whitley County as the Cumberland River in Williamsburg crested to its third highest stage on record of 34.84 feet (10.62 m). The city of Pineville saw the river rise to its second highest crest in history at 1019.06 feet, leading to several families being stranded without homes.

While impacts were greatest along the Cumberland River, several portions of the Kentucky River also flooded. Several roads were impacted in Hazard and Whitesburg, while Booneville, Heidelberg, and Ravenna also exceeded flood stage. Along the Levisa Fork of the Big Sandy River, the city of Pikeville hit flood stage and closed its flood gates.

During the first two weeks of February, "more than eight inches of water fell, causing the Cumberland and Kentucky Rivers to reach their highest levels in 40 years."

== Relief efforts ==
By February 18, Kentucky Baptist Disaster Relief workers were preparing for "mud-outs" (assisting with cleaning mud out of damaged houses) in Harlan, Bell, Knox and Whitley counties." On February 19, $500,000 in grant money was announced for flood cleanup, to ensure "environmentally responsible disposal of solid waste." The Atlantic Magazine noted that this flood has received little attention at the national level, and that there has been no national relief effort.

== See also ==
- Ohio River flood of 1937
- Climate change in Kentucky
