= Benham Historic District =

- U.S. National Register of Historic Places
- U.S. Historic district
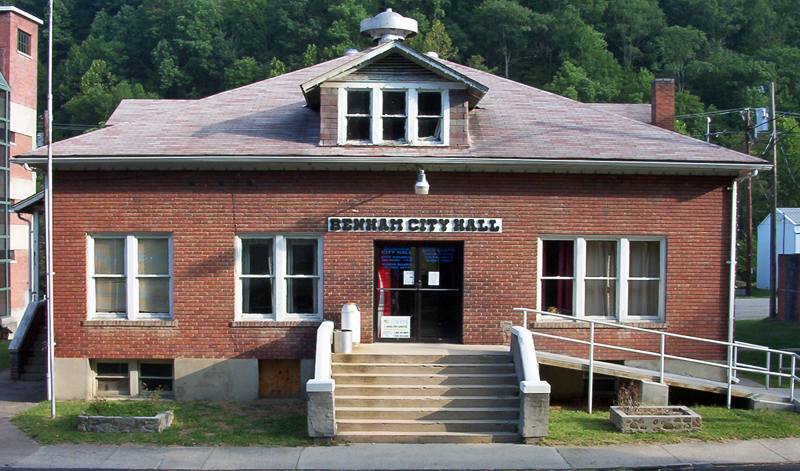
- Benham City Hall

- Location within Kentucky Location within the United States
- Location: KY 160, Central Ave., McKnight and Cypress Sts., Benham, Kentucky
- Coordinates: 36°57′48″N 82°57′02″W
- Area: 3 acres (1.2 ha)
- NRHP reference No.: 83002785
- Added to NRHP: July 21, 1983

The Benham Historic District is a historic district encompassing ten buildings and a public park in Benham, Kentucky. The buildings form the historic center of the coal town of Benham. Benham was founded by Wisconsin Steel, a subsidiary of International Harvester, in 1912; its major buildings were built between 1919 and 1928, replacing the original buildings as the town grew. Mining operations declined during the Great Depression, and as a result the district represents the main period of development in the town. The buildings in the district include Benham's city hall, post office, grade school, Methodist church, jail, theatre, hospital, firehouse, company store, and meat market.

The district was added to the National Register of Historic Places on July 21, 1983. The company store is now home to the Kentucky Coal Museum.
