= Kentenia State Forest =

State forest in Kentucky, United States

- Location within the United States Location within Kentucky
- Nearest city: Harlan, Kentucky
- Coordinates: 36°55′6″N 83°13′20″W
- Area: 4,277 acres (1,731 ha)
- Established: 1919
- Governing body: Department of Natural Resources, Division of Forests

Kentenia State Forest is a state forest in Harlan County, Kentucky, United States. It became Kentucky's first state forest in 1919 when the land was donated to the state by the coal company Kentenia-Cantron. The land is scattered across seven tracts on the south side of Pine Mountain. The park is accessed through Little Shepherd Trail, which is only partly paved and between U.S. 119 and U.S. 421. The 38-mile narrow road follows the crest of Pine Mountain and is partly within the Kentenia State Forest.
