= Darwin K. Kyle =

United States Army Medal of Honor recipient

- Kyle in c. 1940s
- Born: June 1, 1918; Jenkins, Kentucky, U.S.
- Died: February 16, 1951 (aged 32) near Kamil-ni, Korea
- Burial place: Sunset Memorial Park, South Charleston, West Virginia
- Military career
- Allegiance: United States
- Branch: United States Army
- Service years: 1939–1951
- Rank: Second Lieutenant
- Nickname: Gus
- Units: Company K, 7th Infantry Regiment, 3rd Infantry Division
- Conflicts: World War II; Korean War †: Hungnam evacuation
- Awards: Medal of Honor; Silver Star; Soldier's Medal; Bronze Star Medal; Purple Heart

Darwin Keith Kyle (June 1, 1918 – February 16, 1951) was an officer in the United States Army who was posthumously awarded the Medal of Honor in the Korean War. A veteran soldier, Kyle earned both a Silver Star and Bronze Star Medal for his heroic actions in France and Germany during World War II. A master sergeant at the outbreak of the Korean War, "Gus" Kyle was awarded the Soldier's Medal for his heroic actions on December 24, 1950, during the final stages of the Hungnam evacuation. He received a battlefield commission as a second lieutenant on January 27, 1951. He was killed in action on February 16, 1951, and on January 16, 1952, at the Pentagon, his widow accepted the posthumous award of the Medal of Honor for his conspicuous gallantry and intrepidity above and beyond the call of duty.

Kyle joined the army from Racine, West Virginia, in November 1939.

== Citations ==
=== Medal of Honor ===
Rank and organization: Second Lieutenant, U.S. Army, Company K, 7th Infantry Regiment, 3rd Infantry Division

Place and date: Near Kamil-ni, Korea, February 16, 1951

Entered service at: Racine, W. Va. Born: June 1, 1918, Jenkins, Kentucky

G.O. No.: 17, February 1, 1952

Citation

2d Lt. Kyle, distinguished himself by conspicuous gallantry and intrepidity above and beyond the call of duty in action against the enemy. When his platoon had been pinned down by intense fire, he completely exposed himself to move among and encourage his men to continue the advance against enemy forces strongly entrenched on Hill 185. Inspired by his courageous leadership, the platoon resumed the advance but was again pinned down when an enemy machine gun opened fire, wounding 6 of the men. 2d Lt. Kyle immediately charged the hostile emplacement alone, engaged the crew in hand-to-hand combat, killing all 3. Continuing on toward the objective, his platoon suddenly received an intense automatic-weapons fire from a well-concealed hostile position on its right flank. Again leading his men in a daring bayonet charge against this position, firing his carbine and throwing grenades, 2d Lt. Kyle personally destroyed 4 of the enemy before he was killed by a burst from an enemy submachine gun. The extraordinary heroism and outstanding leadership of 2d Lt. Kyle, and his gallant self-sacrifice, reflect the highest credit upon himself and are in keeping with the esteemed traditions of the military service.

=== Soldier's Medal ===
The President of the United States of America, authorized by Act of Congress, July 2, 1926, takes pleasure in presenting the Soldier’s Medal to Second Lieutenant (Infantry) [then Master Sergeant] Darwin Keith Kyle (ASN: 0-2262608), United States Army, for heroism not involving actual conflict with an enemy of the United States while serving with Company K, 3d Battalion, 7th Infantry Regiment, 3d Infantry Division, in action in Korea. On 24 December 1950, during the final stages of the evacuation of the beachhead at Hung-nam, Korea, a tremendous explosion of an ammunition dump sprayed the area with shrapnel and white phosphorous. Many of the men boarding landing crafts were wounded and all were stunned by the explosion and the concussion that followed. Lieutenant Kyle, quickly regaining his senses and with utter disregard for his own personal safety, restored order and directed the removal of the wounded. One of the landing crafts had been hit and the rudder mechanism completely destroyed. Fearlessly, Lieutenant Kyle returned to the beachhead inferno to find tools and materials. Constantly endangered by succeeding explosions, he was able to effect emergency repairs and guide the craft away from the flaming beach, shortly before the beach was rocked by an explosion which would have destroyed the craft if it had remained. The courage, initiative, and concern for his comrades displayed by Lieutenant Kyle saved many lives and reflects great credit upon himself and the military service.

== Awards and Decorations ==

Badge	Combat Infantryman Badge with Star denoting 2nd award		
1st row	Medal of Honor		Silver Star
2nd row	Soldier's Medal	Bronze Star Medal with 1 Oak leaf cluster	Purple Heart
3rd row	Army Good Conduct Medal	American Defense Service Medal	American Campaign Medal
4th row	European-African-Middle Eastern Campaign Medal with 2 Campaign stars	World War II Victory Medal	National Defense Service Medal
5th row	Korean Service Medal with 2 Campaign stars	United Nations Service Medal Korea	Korean War Service Medal Retroactively Awarded, 2003
Unit Awards	Presidential Unit Citation		Korean Presidential Unit Citation

== Legacy ==
The U.S. Army named a camp after Kyle, Camp Kyle, near Uijeongbu, South Korea.

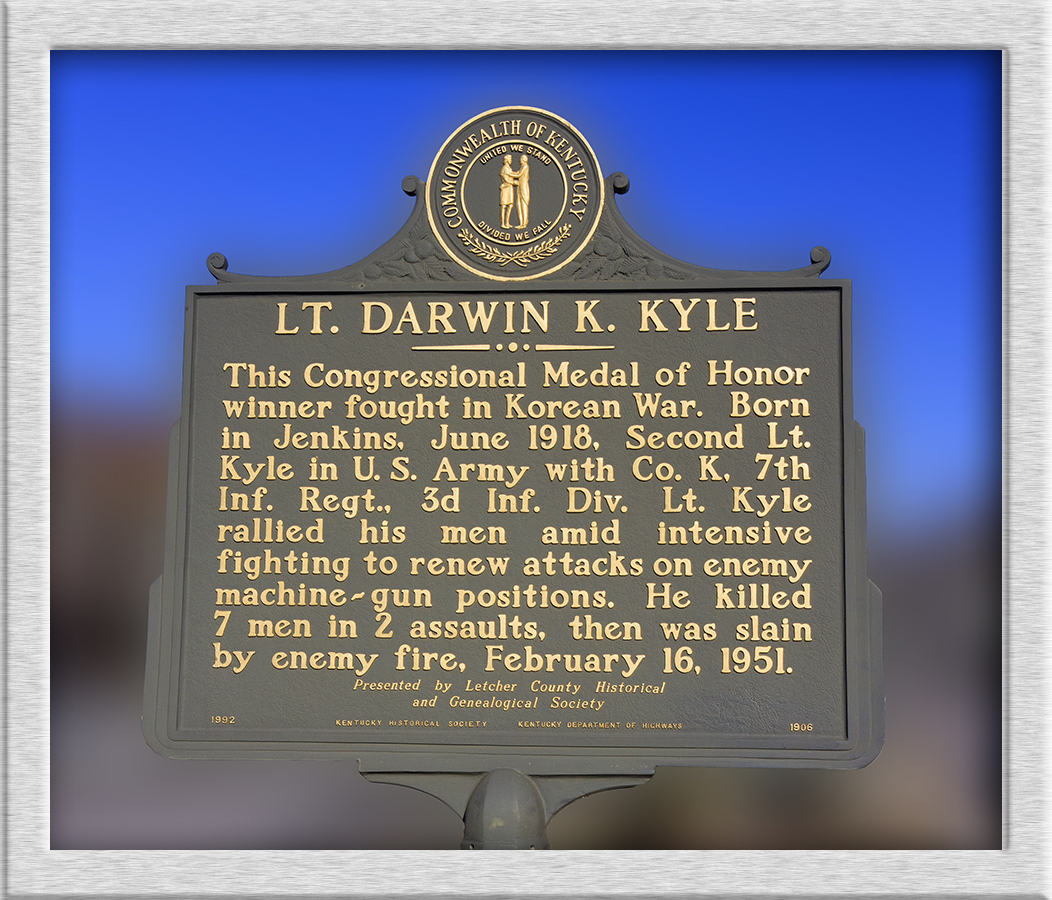
Darwin K. Kyle Historical Marker in Jenkins, KY

== See also ==
- List of Korean War Medal of Honor recipients
