= Lynch, Kentucky =

- City
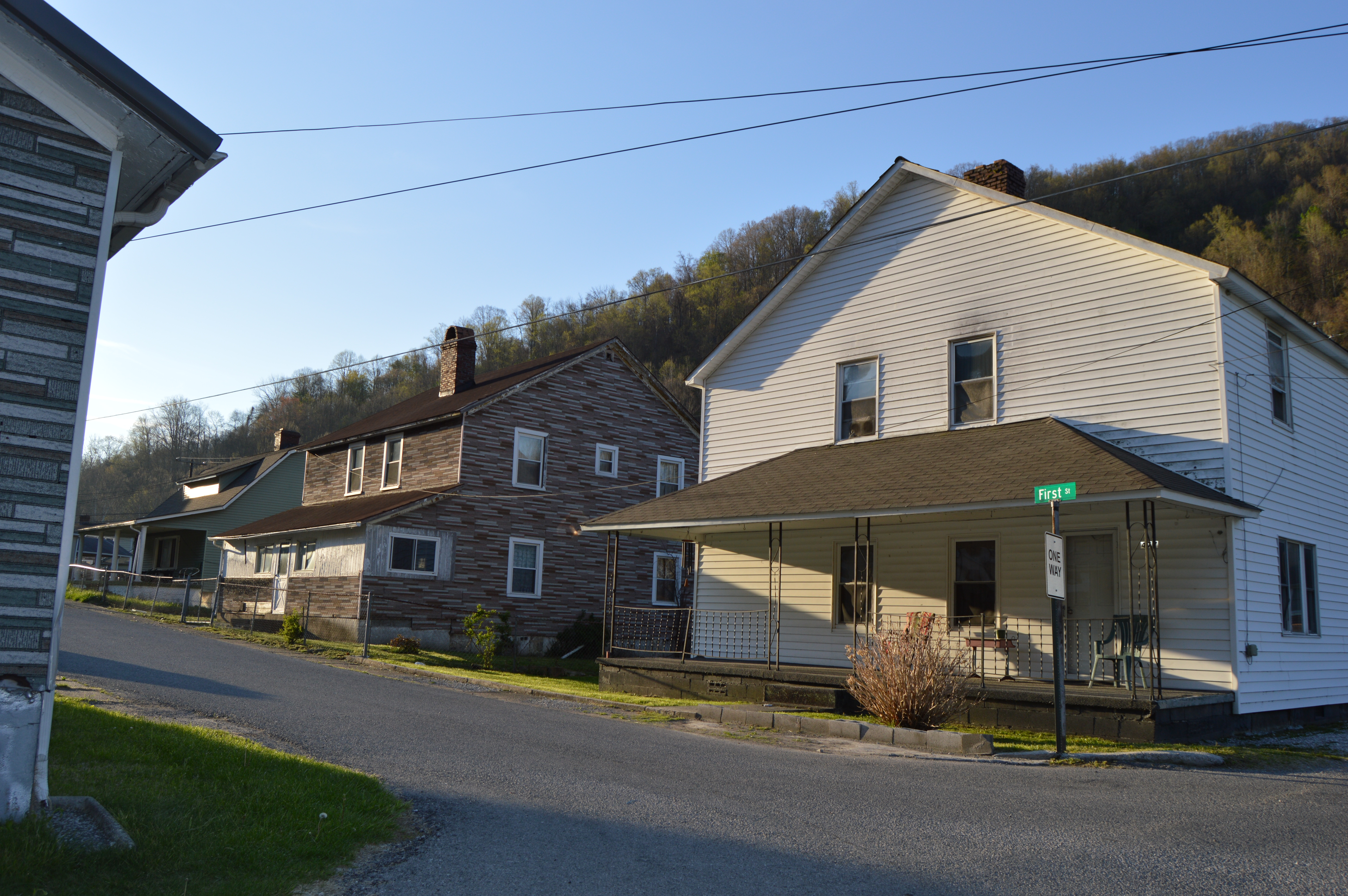
- Houses at Lynch's western end

- Location of Lynch in Harlan County, Kentucky.
- Coordinates: 36°57′54″N 82°55′00″W
- Country: United States
- State: Kentucky
- County: Harlan
- Incorporated: May 7, 1963
- Named after: Thomas Lynch, the head of U.S. Coal and Coke Company

Government
  - Mayor: John Adams

Area
  - Total: 0.30 sq mi (0.78 km^{2})
  - Land: 0.30 sq mi (0.78 km^{2})
  - Water: 0 sq mi (0.00 km^{2})
- Elevation: 1,716 ft (523 m)

Population (2020)
  - Total: 658
  - Density: 2,198.0/sq mi (848.65/km^{2})
- Time zone: UTC-5 (Eastern (EST))
  - Summer (DST): UTC-4 (EDT)
- ZIP code: 40855
- Area code: 606
- FIPS code: 21-48540
- GNIS feature ID: 0497363

Lynch is a home rule-class city in Harlan County, Kentucky, United States. In the 2020 census the city population was 658, down from 747 in 2010.

== History ==
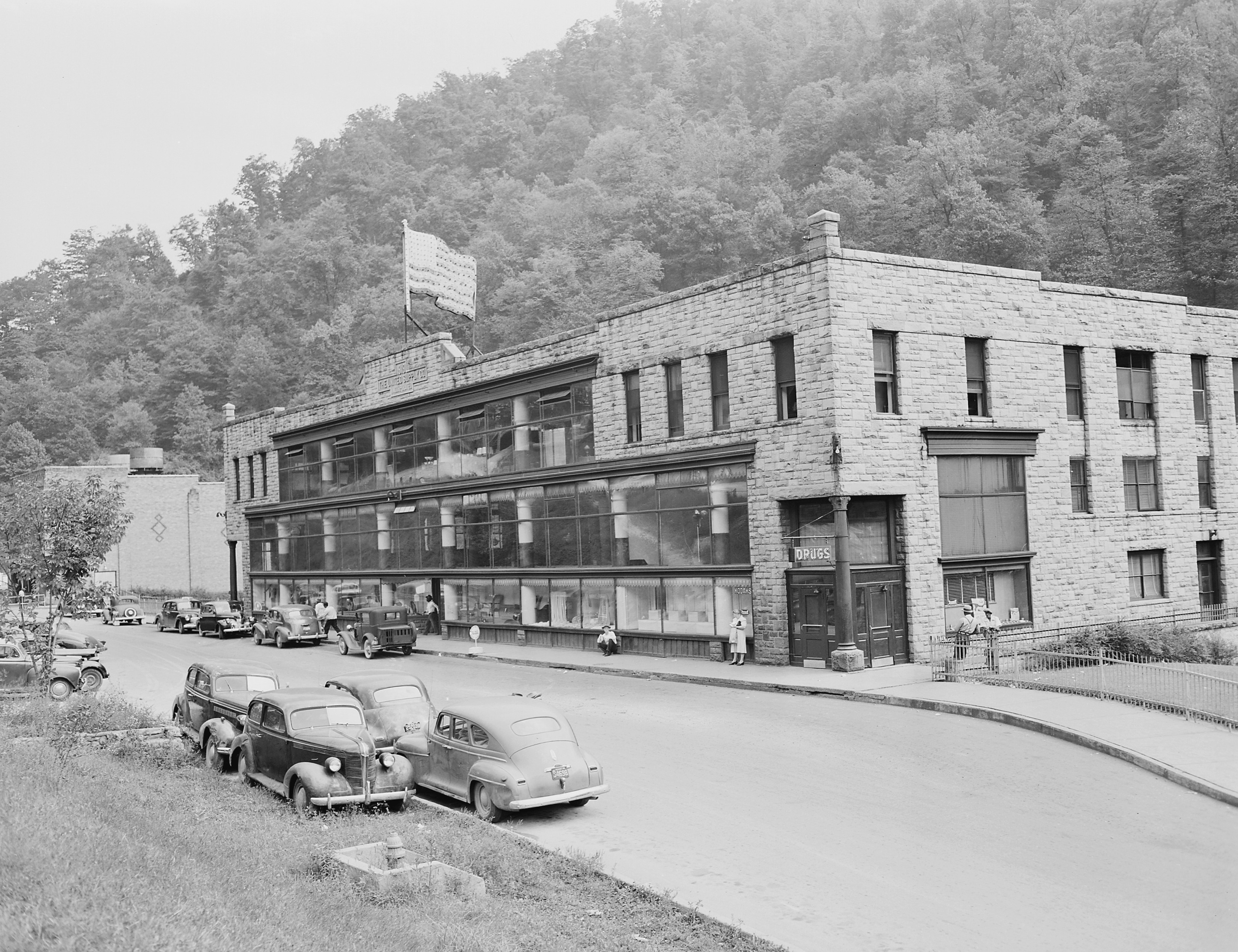
A company store owned and operated by the U.S. Coal and Coke Company in Lynch, Kentucky. At this store, miners employed by the coal company could buy groceries and other necessities for their families, 1945

Lynch was plotted in 1917 by the U.S. Coal and Coke Company (a subsidiary of U.S. Steel) as a company town to house workers at the company's nearby coal mines. It was named for then-head of the company, Thomas Lynch.

By the 1940s, Lynch had a population of 10,000 and had such amenities as a hospital and movie theater. The population declined dramatically in the 1960s and 1970s as mining techniques shifted to less labor-intensive methods.

In 1996, the rails to Lynch and nearby Benham were officially abandoned.

In 2012, PBS of Eastern Tennessee created a documentary titled The Eastern Kentucky Social Club dealing with the history of the black community and immigrant community in Lynch.

== Geography ==
Lynch is located in eastern Harlan County at 36°57′54″N 82°55′00″W (36.965133, -82.916569), in the valley of Looney Creek. Lynch is the nearest city to Kentucky's highest point, Black Mountain (4,145 ft or 1,263 m). Sitting at an elevation of 1,716 feet (523 m) above sea level.

Lynch is Kentucky's highest incorporated city. It is bordered by 3,488-foot (1,063 m) Looney Ridge to the north and 3,640-foot (1,110 m) Benham Spur to the south. The city of Benham borders the west side of Lynch, and Cumberland is 4 miles (6 km) to the west via Kentucky Route 160, the main road through Lynch. KY 160 leads southeast up the valley of Looney Creek to the Virginia border on the crest of Black Mountain at an elevation of 3,700 feet (1,100 m), then continues to Appalachia, Virginia, 16 miles (26 km) southeast of Lynch.

According to the United States Census Bureau, Lynch has a total area of 0.3 square miles (0.78 km^{2}), all of it land.

== Demographics ==
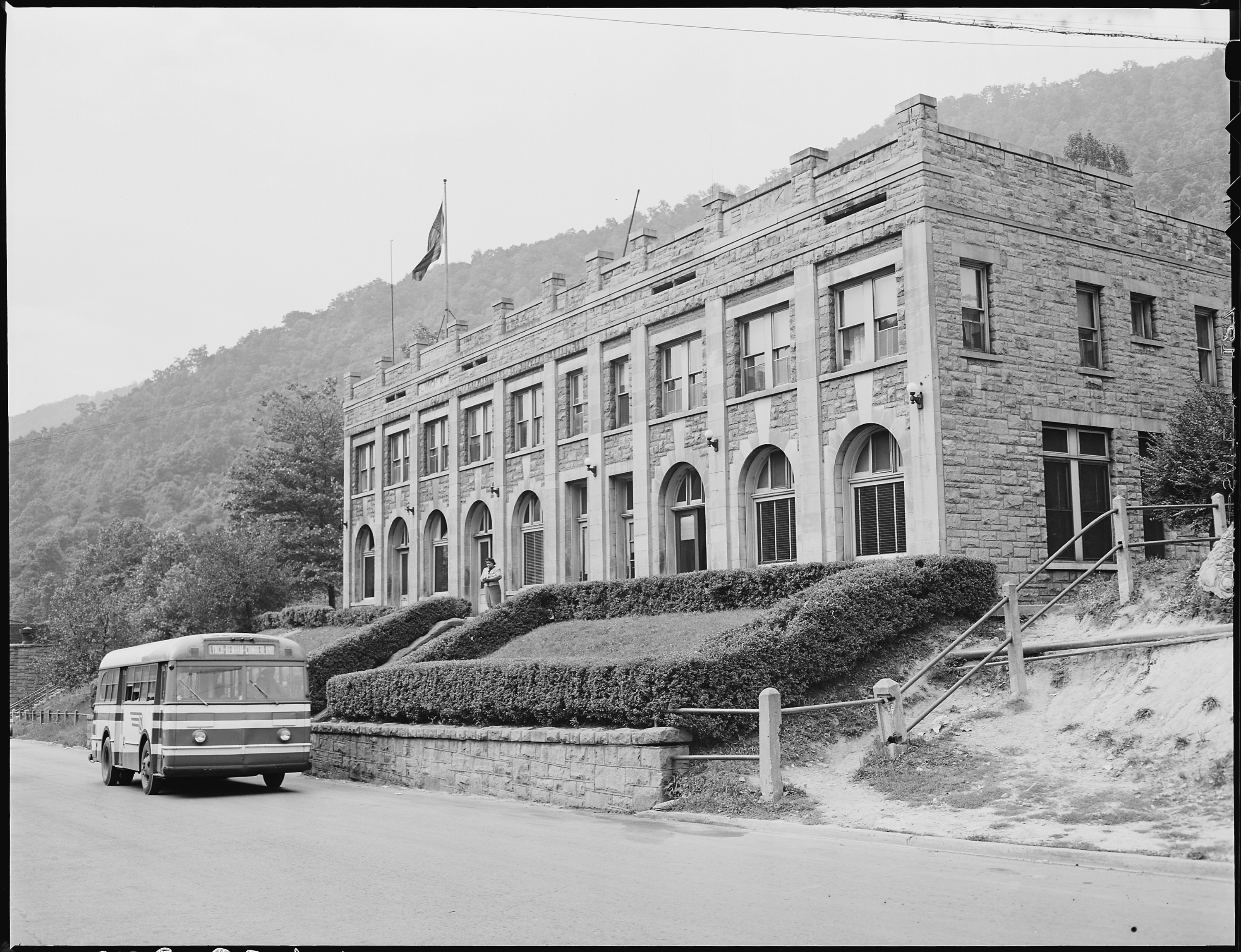
Lynch Post Office in 1946

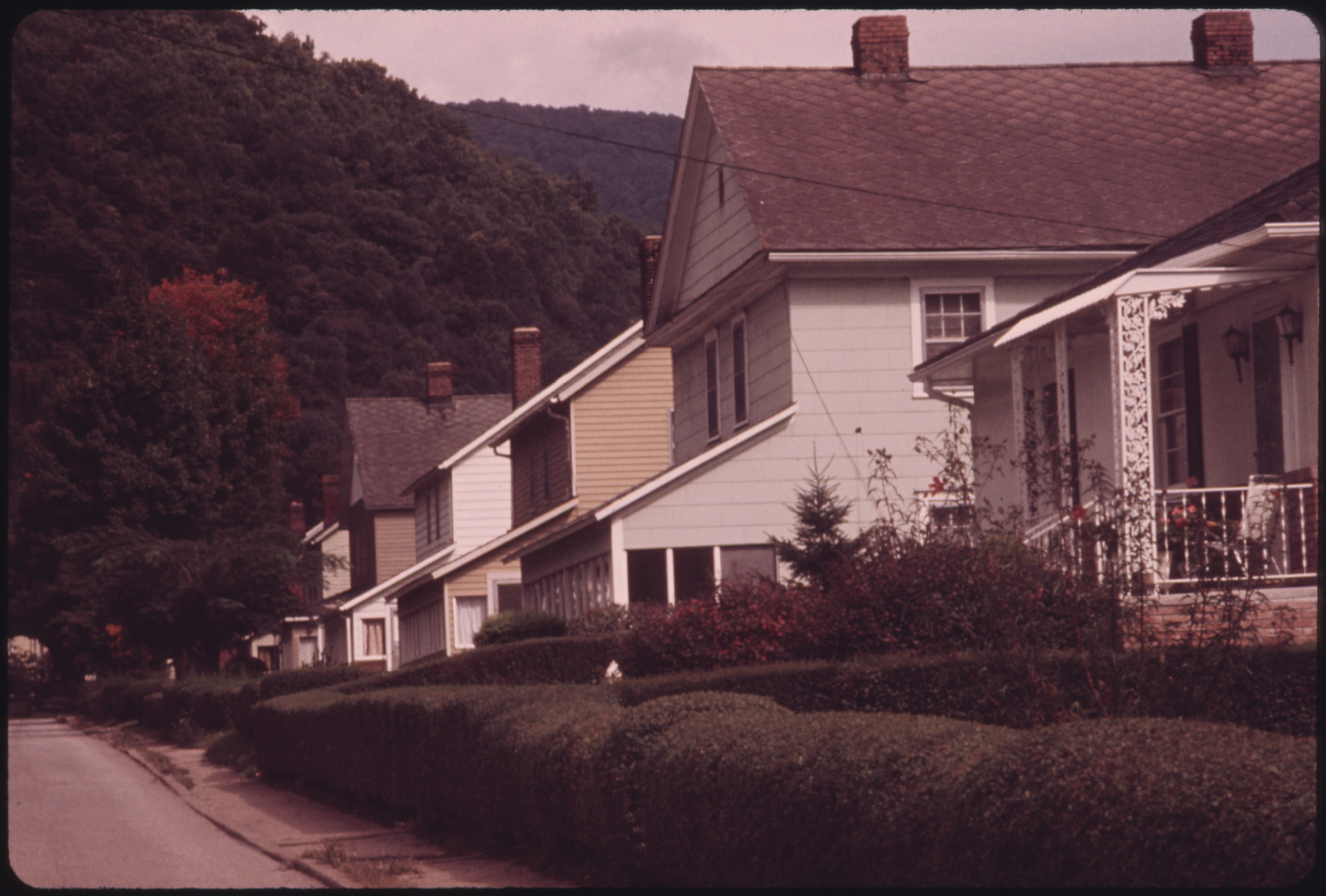
Lynch in 1973

As of the census of 2000, there were 900 people, 408 households, and 250 families residing in the city. The population density was 2,753.1 inhabitants per square mile (1,063.0/km^{2}). There were 514 housing units at an average density of 1,572.3 per square mile (607.1/km^{2}). The racial makeup of the city was 73.33% White, 24.89% Black or African American, 0.33% Native American, and 1.44% from two or more races. Hispanic or Latino of any race were 0.33% of the population.

Historical population
Census	Pop.	Note	%±
1970	1,517		—
1980	1,614		6.4%
1990	1,166		−27.8%
2000	900		−22.8%
2010	747		−17.0%
2020	658		−11.9%
U.S. Decennial Census

There were 408 households, out of which 24.0% had children under the age of 18 living with them, 40.7% were married couples living together, 16.2% had a female householder with no husband present, and 38.5% were non-families. 36.8% of all households were made up of individuals, and 20.1% had someone living alone who was 65 years of age or older. The average household size was 2.21 and the average family size was 2.88.

In the city, the population was spread out, with 22.6% under 18, 8.9% from 18 to 24, 20.4% from 25 to 44, 28.2% from 45 to 64, and 19.9% who were 65 or older. The median age was 43 years. For every 100 females, there were 82.6 males. For every 100 females age 18 and over, there were 80.1 males.

The median income for a household in the city was $17,609, and the median income for a family was $21,625. Males had a median income of $31,500 versus $19,038 for females. The per capita income for the city was $13,369. About 36.7% of families and 37.8% of the population were below the poverty line, including 57.6% of those under age 18 and 25.9% of those age 65 or over.

== Notable people ==
- Leland Byrd, College basketball coach and player
- Juanita M. Kreps, United States Secretary of Commerce
- Louise Slaughter, United States politician

== See also ==
- Lynch Historic District
- Benham-Lynch State Resort Park, proposed
