= Cumberland River =

River in Kentucky and Tennessee, United States

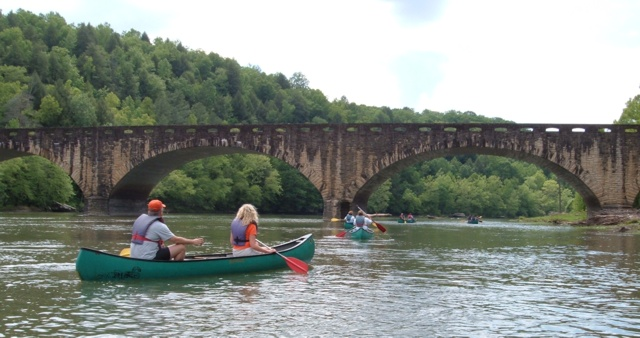
- Canoers on the Cumberland River upstream from Cumberland Falls

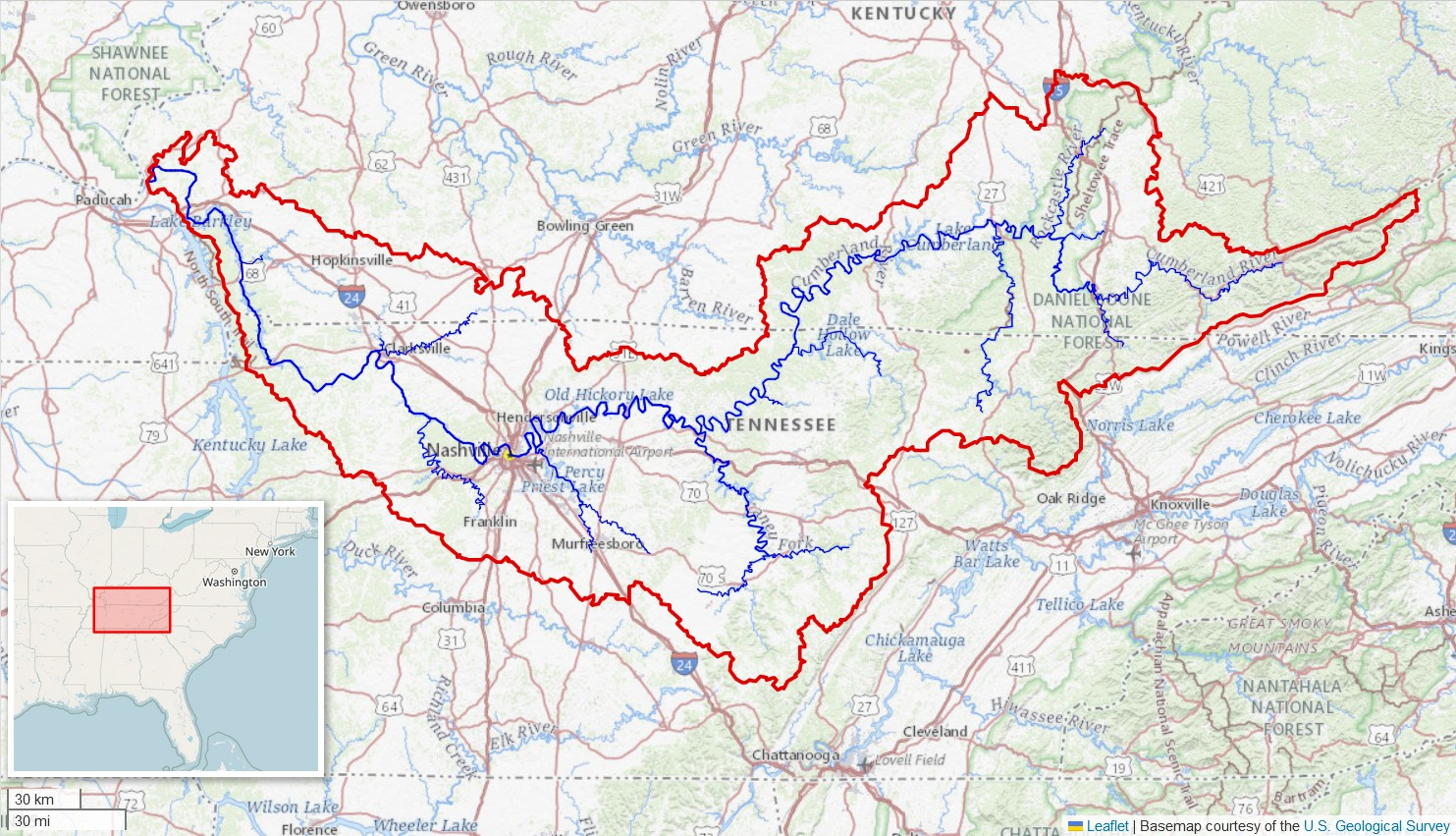
- Cumberland River watershed (Interactive map)

Location
- Country: United States
- State: Kentucky, Tennessee
- Cities: Barbourville, KY; Williamsburg, KY; Burkesville, KY; Carthage, TN; Nashville, TN; Clarksville, TN; Dover, TN

Physical characteristics
- Source: Confluence of the Poor Fork, Clover Fork and Martins Fork
  - location: Harlan, Kentucky
  - coordinates: 36°50′42″N 83°19′26″W
  - elevation: 1,158 ft (353 m)
- Mouth: Ohio River
  - location: Livingston County, Kentucky
  - coordinates: 37°08′36″N 88°24′27″W
  - elevation: 302 ft (92 m)
- Length: 688 mi (1,107 km)
- Basin size: 17,728 sq mi (45,920 km^{2})
- Discharge
  - location: below Barkley Dam, about 31 mi (50 km) from the mouth
  - average: 37,250 cu ft/s (1,055 m^{3}/s)
  - minimum: 6,085 cu ft/s (172.3 m^{3}/s)
  - maximum: 209,000 cu ft/s (5,900 m^{3}/s)

Basin features
- Tributaries
  - left: Martins Fork, Clear Fork, Big South Fork, Obey River, Caney Fork River, Stones River, Harpeth River
  - right: Clover Fork, Poor Fork, Laurel River, Rockcastle River, Red River, Little River

The Cumberland River is a major waterway of the Southern United States. The 688-mile-long (1,107 km) river drains almost 18,000 square miles (47,000 km^{2}) of southern Kentucky and north-central Tennessee. The river flows generally west from a source in the Appalachian Mountains to its confluence with the Ohio River near Paducah, Kentucky, and the mouth of the Tennessee River. Major tributaries include the Obey, Caney Fork, Stones, and Red Rivers.

Although the Cumberland River basin is predominantly rural, there are also some large cities on the river, including Nashville and Clarksville, both in Tennessee.

The river system has been extensively altered for flood control. Major dams impound areas of both the main stem and many of its important tributaries.

== Geography ==
Its headwaters are three separate forks that begin in Kentucky and converge in Baxter, Kentucky, located in Harlan County. Martin's Fork starts near Hensley Settlement on Brush Mountain in Bell County and snakes its way north through the mountains to Baxter. Clover Fork starts on Black Mountain in Holmes Mill, near the Virginia border, and flows west in parallel with Kentucky Route 38 until it reaches Harlan.

Clover Fork once flowed through downtown Harlan and merged with Martins Fork at what is now the intersection of Kentucky Route 38 and U.S. Route 421. A flood control project begun in 1992, which diverted the river through a tunnel under Little Black Mountain, from which it emerges in Baxter and converges with Martins Fork. Poor Fork begins as a small stream on Pine Mountain in Letcher County near Flat Gap, Virginia. It flows southwest in parallel with Pine Mountain until it merges with the other two forks in Baxter.

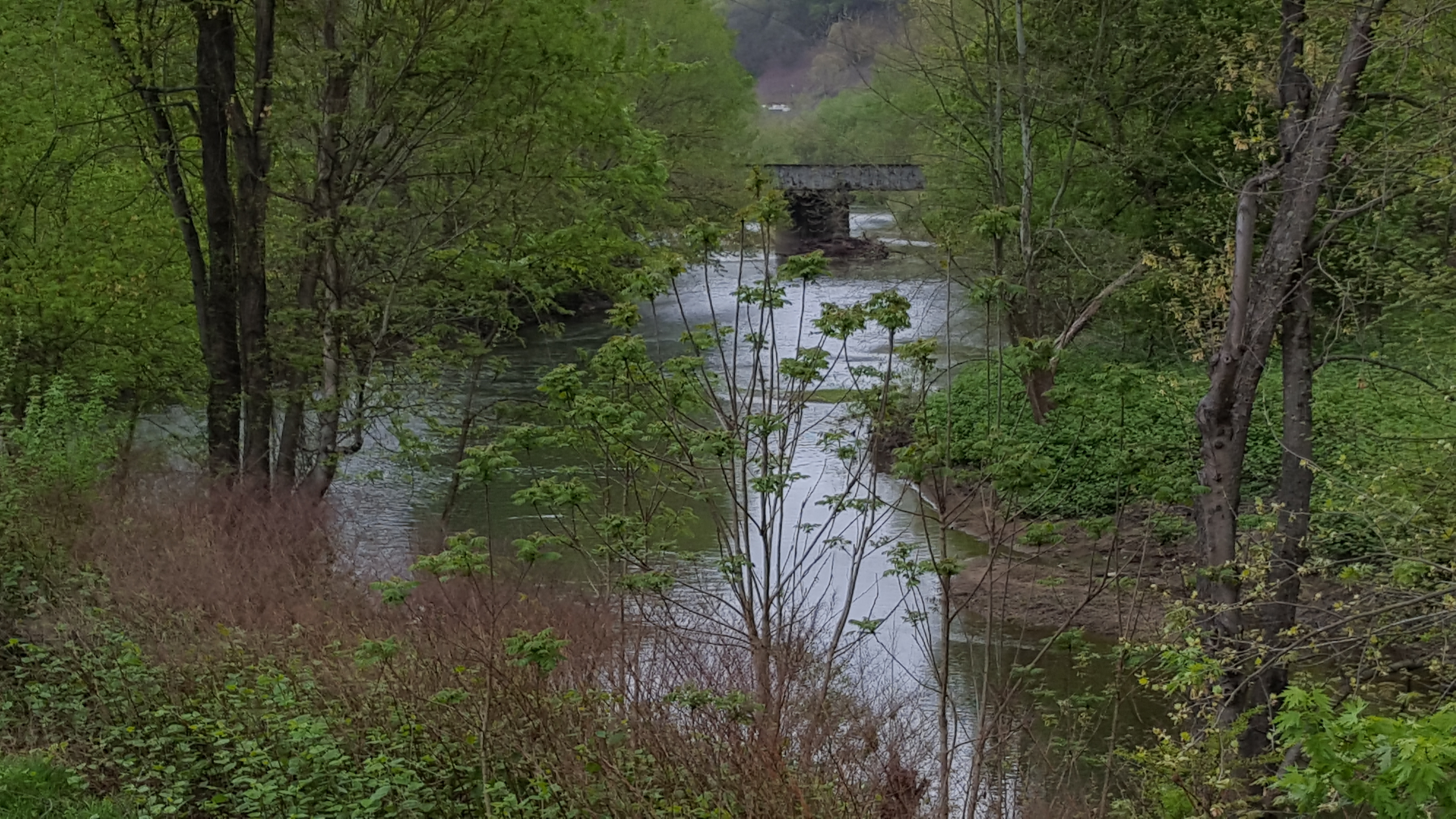
Confluence of the Cumberland River headwater forks at Baxter

From there, the wider river, now named Cumberland, continues flowing west through the mountains of Kentucky before turning northward toward Cumberland Falls. The 68-foot (21 m) falls is one of the largest waterfalls in the southeastern United States and is one of the few places in the Western Hemisphere where a moonbow can be seen.

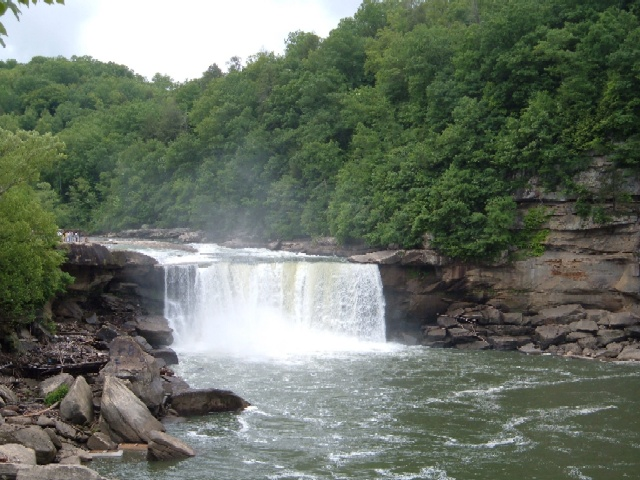
Cumberland falls

Beyond Cumberland Falls, the river turns abruptly west once again and continues to expand as other creeks and streams feed into it. It receives the Laurel and Rockcastle rivers from the northeast, followed by the Big South Fork of the Cumberland River from the south. From here it flows into the man-made Lake Cumberland, formed by Wolf Creek Dam. The more than 100-mile (160 km) reservoir is one of the largest artificial lakes in the eastern US.

Near Celina, Tennessee, the river crosses south into that state, where it is joined by the Obey River and Caney Fork. Northeast of Nashville, the river is dammed twice more, forming Cordell Hull Lake and Old Hickory Lake. After flowing through Nashville and picking up the Stones River, the river is dammed to form Cheatham Lake. The river turns northwest toward Clarksville, where it is joined by the Red River.

It flows back into Kentucky at the Land Between the Lakes National Recreation Area, a section of land nestled between Lake Barkley, which is fed by the Cumberland River, and Kentucky Lake. Finally, the river flows north and merges with the Ohio River at Smithland, northeast of Paducah.

== History ==
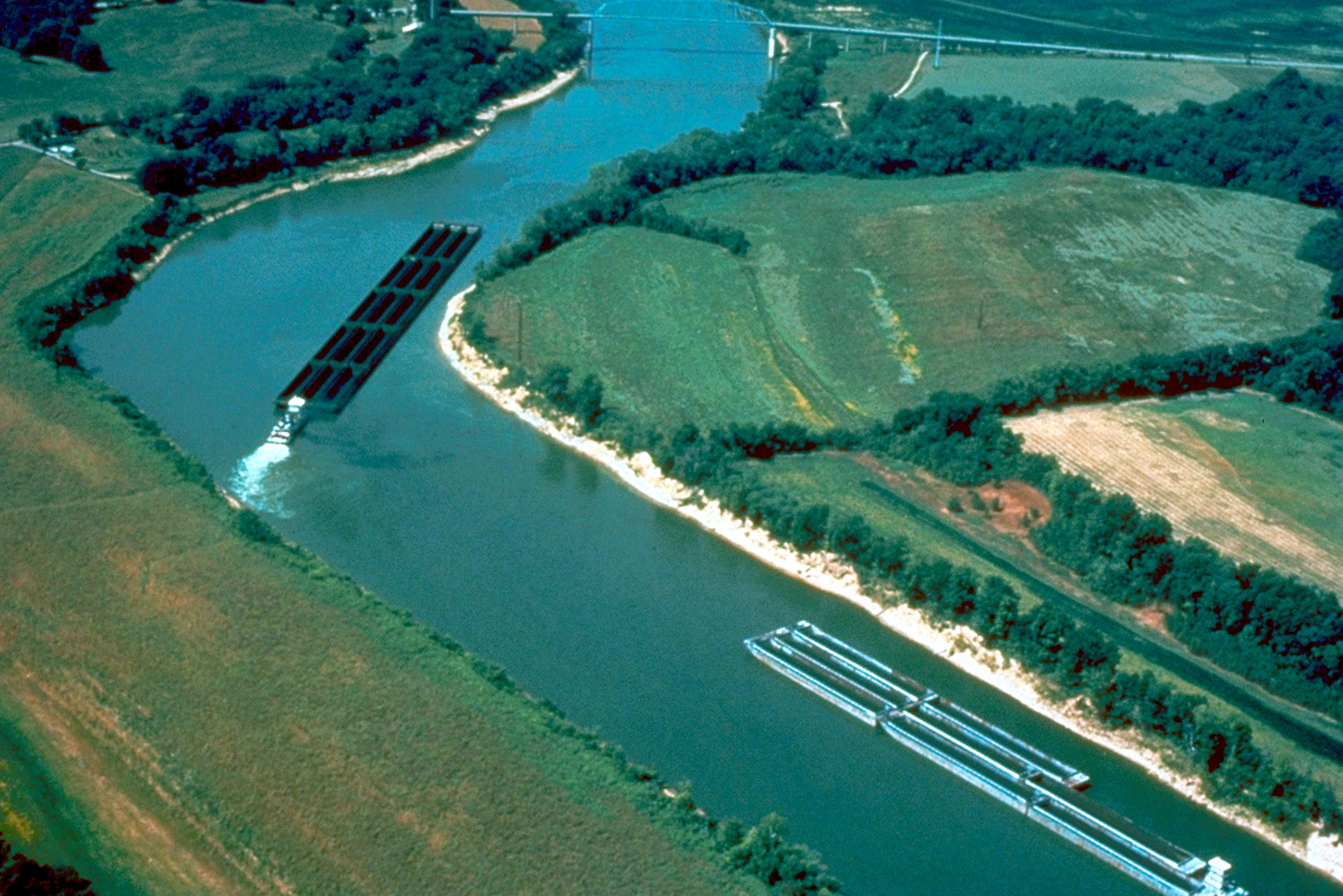
Barge traffic on the Cumberland River. The U.S. Army Corps of Engineers maintains the river for tug-and-barge navigation.

The explorer Thomas Walker of Virginia in 1758 named the river, but whether for the Duke of Cumberland or the English county of Cumberland is not known.

The Cumberland River was called Wasioto by the Shawnee Native Americans, who lived in this area. French traders called it the Riviere des Chaouanons, or "River of the Shawnee" for this association. The river was also known as the Shawnee River (or Shawanoe River) for years after Walker's trip.

Important first as a passage for hunters and settlers, the Cumberland River also supported later riverboat trade, which traveled to the Ohio and Mississippi rivers. The river became central to the establishment of the Cumberland settlement in present-day Middle Tennessee. Following the arrival of settlers, the settlers adopted the Cumberland Compact in 1780, an agreement establishing a provisional civil government. Villages, towns, and cities were formed at landing points along the river's banks. Through the middle of the 19th century, settlers depended on rivers as the primary transportation routes for trading and travel.

=== Floods ===
In more recent history, a number of severe floods have struck various regions that the river flows through. In April 1977, Harlan, Kentucky, and many surrounding communities were inundated with floodwaters, destroying most of the homes and businesses within the floodplain of the river. This event led to the building of the Martins Fork Dam for flood control and the diversion of the Clover Fork around the city of Harlan. In addition, the river was diverted through a mountain cut in Loyall, Kentucky.

In late April and early May 2010, due to the 2010 Tennessee floods, the river overflowed its banks and flooded Nashville and Clarksville, Tennessee. The downtown area of Nashville was ordered to evacuate.

Major flooding occurred along the Cumberland River at Pineville, Barbourville, and Williamsburg in early February 2020.

== See also ==
- Quadrula tuberosa — Cumberland River endemic 'Rough rockshell' freshwater mussel.
- List of crossings of the Cumberland River
- List of longest rivers of the United States (by main stem)
- List of rivers of Kentucky
- List of rivers of Tennessee
