= Benham, Kentucky =

- City
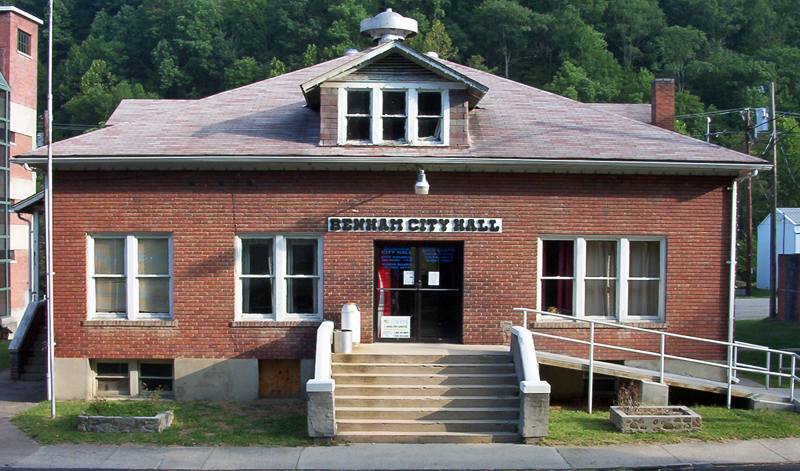
- Benham City Hall
- Nickname: The Little Town That International Harvester, Coal Miners, and Their Families Built
- Location of Benham in Harlan County, Kentucky.
- Coordinates: 36°57′53″N 82°57′13″W
- Country: United States
- State: Kentucky
- County: Harlan
- Incorporated: March 7, 1961

Government
  - Mayor: Howard White

Area
  - Total: 0.24 sq mi (0.61 km^{2})
  - Land: 0.24 sq mi (0.61 km^{2})
  - Water: 0 sq mi (0.00 km^{2})
- Elevation: 1,591 ft (485 m)

Population (2020)
  - Total: 512
  - Density: 2,185.8/sq mi (843.93/km^{2})
- Time zone: UTC-5 (EST)
  - Summer (DST): UTC-4 (EDT)
- ZIP code: 40807
- Area code: 606
- FIPS code: 21-05662
- GNIS feature ID: 0486849
- Website: www.benhamky.org

Benham is a home rule-class city in Harlan County, Kentucky, in the United States. The city was formally incorporated by the General Assembly in 1961. The population was 512 at the 2020 census, up from 500 at the 2010 census.

== History ==
Benham was originally a company town for International Harvester. The Benham Historic District is on the National Register of Historic Places in recognition of the coal town.

== Geography ==
Benham is located in eastern Harlan County at 36°57′53″N 82°57′15″W (36.964832, -82.954035), in the valley of Looney Creek, between Looney Ridge to the north and Benham Spur to the south. Looney Creek flows west to the Poor Fork of the Cumberland River in neighboring Cumberland.

Kentucky Route 160 is Benham's Main Street, leading west 2.5 miles (4.0 km) to Cumberland and east through Lynch 9 miles (14 km) to the Virginia border at the crest of Black Mountain just north of its summit, the highest point in Kentucky.

According to the United States Census Bureau, Benham has a total area of 0.23 square miles (0.6 km^{2}), all of it land.

== Demographics ==
Historical population
Census	Pop.	Note	%±
1970	1,000		—
1980	936		−6.4%
1990	717		−23.4%
2000	599		−16.5%
2010	500		−16.5%
2020	512		2.4%
U.S. Decennial Census

As of the census of 2000, there were 599 people, 248 households, and 181 families residing in the city. The population density was 1,519.2 inhabitants per square mile (586.6/km^{2}). There were 288 housing units at an average density of 730.4 per square mile (282.0/km^{2}). The racial makeup of the city was 88.81% White, 9.85% African American, 0.33% Native American, 0.17% Asian, 0.33% from other races, and 0.50% from two or more races. Hispanic or Latino of any race were 0.50% of the population.

There were 248 households, out of which 31.0% had children under the age of 18 living with them, 59.3% were married couples living together, 9.7% had a female householder with no husband present, and 27.0% were non-families. 26.6% of all households were made up of individuals, and 19.4% had someone living alone who was 65 years of age or older. The average household size was 2.42 and the average family size was 2.88.

In the city, the population was spread out, with 22.9% under the age of 18, 4.5% from 18 to 24, 24.9% from 25 to 44, 28.2% from 45 to 64, and 19.5% who were 65 years of age or older. The median age was 44 years. For every 100 females, there were 93.9 males. For every 100 females age 18 and over, there were 83.3 males.

The median income for a household in the city was $25,250, and the median income for a family was $33,333. Males had a median income of $35,000 versus $24,844 for females. The per capita income for the city was $16,174. About 18.1% of families and 20.2% of the population were below the poverty line, including 26.8% of those under age 18 and 18.7% of those age 65 or over.

== Environmental concerns ==
In 2010, various city employees and residents expressed concern for the city's relatively high-quality drinking water. While many claimed that the drinking water is cleaner than water anywhere else in the general area, many argued that underground coal mining will contaminate public water supplies for both Benham and the adjacent city of Lynch.

== Notable people ==
- Bernie Bickerstaff, NBA executive and head coach

== See also ==
- Kentucky Coal Museum

== Gallery ==
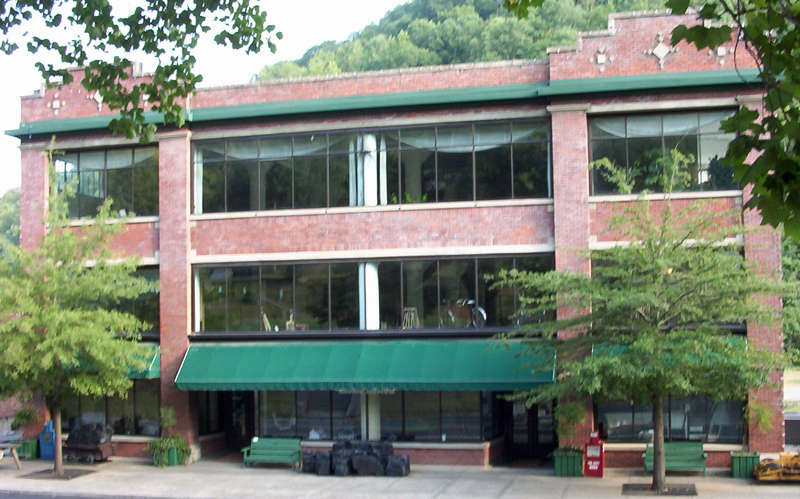
Kentucky Coal Museum

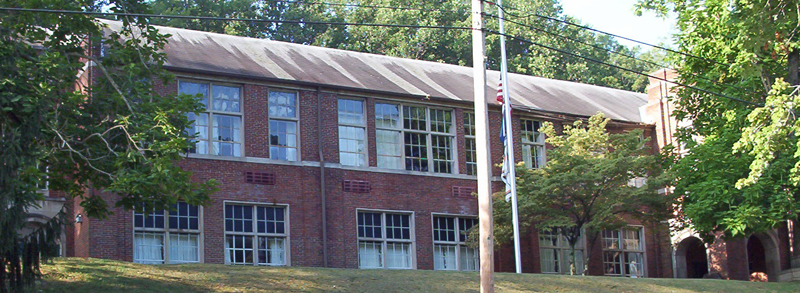
Benham Schoolhouse Inn

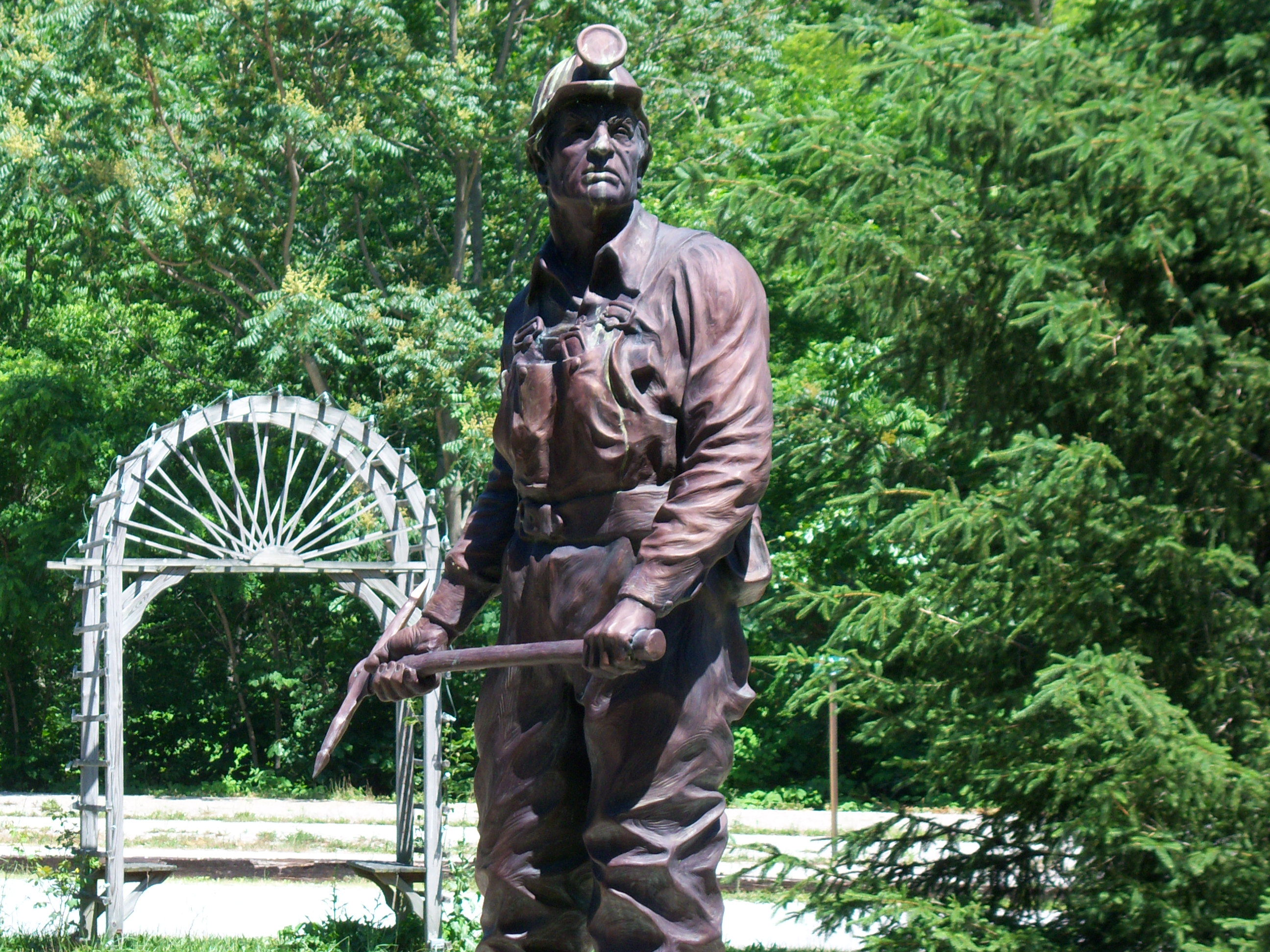
Coal Miner Statue
