= Martin's Fork (Cumberland River tributary) =

Martins Fork
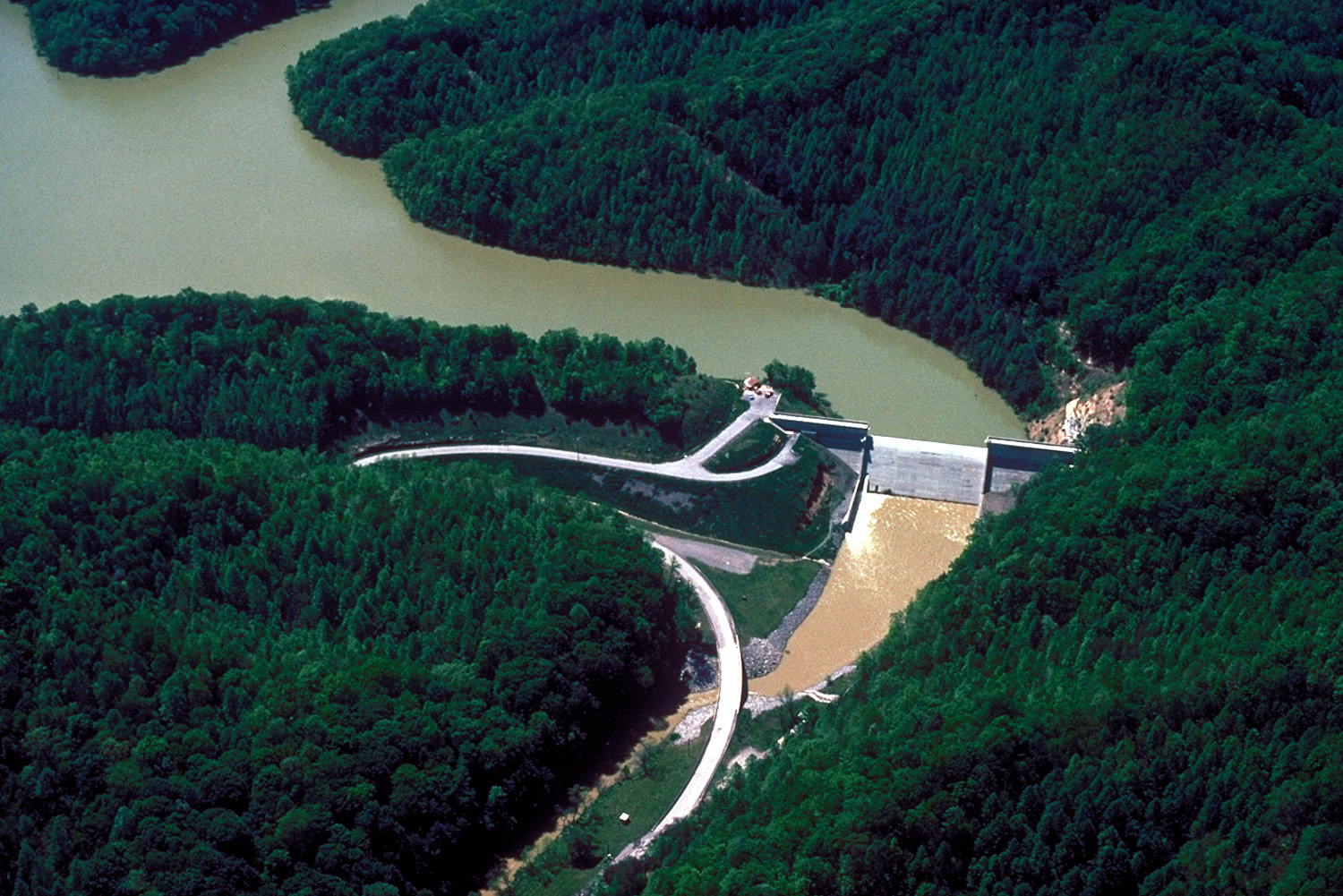
- Martin's Fork Lake

Physical characteristics
- Mouth
  - location: Harlan, Kentucky
  - coordinates: 36°50′42″N 83°19′27″W
  - elevation: 1,158 ft (353 m)
- Length: 32 mi (51 km)
- Discharge
  - location: Harlan, Kentucky
  - average: 243 cu/ft. per sec.

Basin features
- Progression: Cumberland—Ohio—Mississippi

Martins Fork is a 32-mile (51 km) river in Bell and Harlan Counties in Kentucky in the United States. The river flows east and north from its source in the Cumberland Mountains, a subrange of the Appalachian Mountains, to its confluence with the Poor Fork at Baxter. The confluence marks the official beginning of the Cumberland River.

== See also ==
- Martins Fork Lake
- List of rivers of Kentucky
