= Baxter, Kentucky =

Unincorporated community in Kentucky, United States

- Unincorporated community
- Location within Kentucky Location within the United States
- Coordinates: 36°51′35″N 83°19′51″W
- Country: United States
- State: Kentucky
- County: Harlan
- Elevation: 1,211 ft (369 m)
- Time zone: UTC-5 (Eastern (EST))
  - Summer (DST): UTC-4 (EDT)
- ZIP codes: 40806
- GNIS feature ID: 486480

Baxter is an unincorporated community in Harlan County, Kentucky, United States.

The community sits at the confluence of Martin's Fork with Clover Fork to form the Cumberland River.
