= Jenkins, Kentucky =

- City
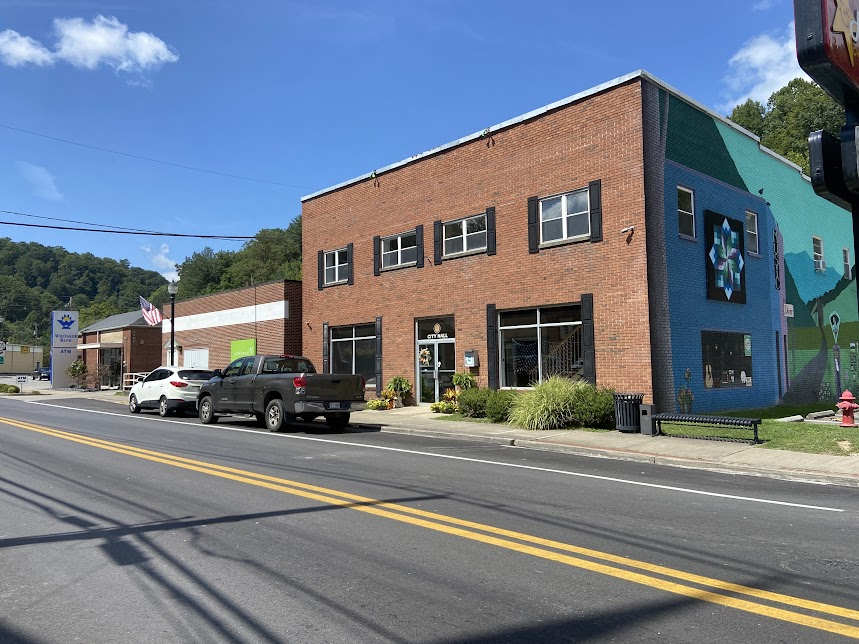
- Downtown Jenkins

- Location in Letcher County, Kentucky
- Coordinates: 37°10′48″N 82°37′56″W
- Country: United States
- State: Kentucky
- County: Letcher
- Incorporated: January 9, 1912
- Named for: the director of a local coal company

Government
  - Type: Mayor-Council
  - Mayor: Todd DePriest

Area
  - Total: 8.88 sq mi (22.99 km^{2})
  - Land: 8.85 sq mi (22.91 km^{2})
  - Water: 0.031 sq mi (0.08 km^{2})
- Elevation: 1,539 ft (469 m)

Population (2020)
  - Total: 1,902
  - Estimate (2022): 1,830
  - Density: 215.0/sq mi (83.03/km^{2})
- Time zone: UTC-5 (Eastern (EST))
  - Summer (DST): UTC-4 (EDT)
- ZIP code: 41537
- Area code: 606
- FIPS code: 21-40312
- GNIS feature ID: 0495200
- Website: www.cityofjenkins.org

Jenkins is a home rule-class city in Letcher County, Kentucky, United States. As of the 2020 census, Jenkins had a population of 1,902.

== History ==
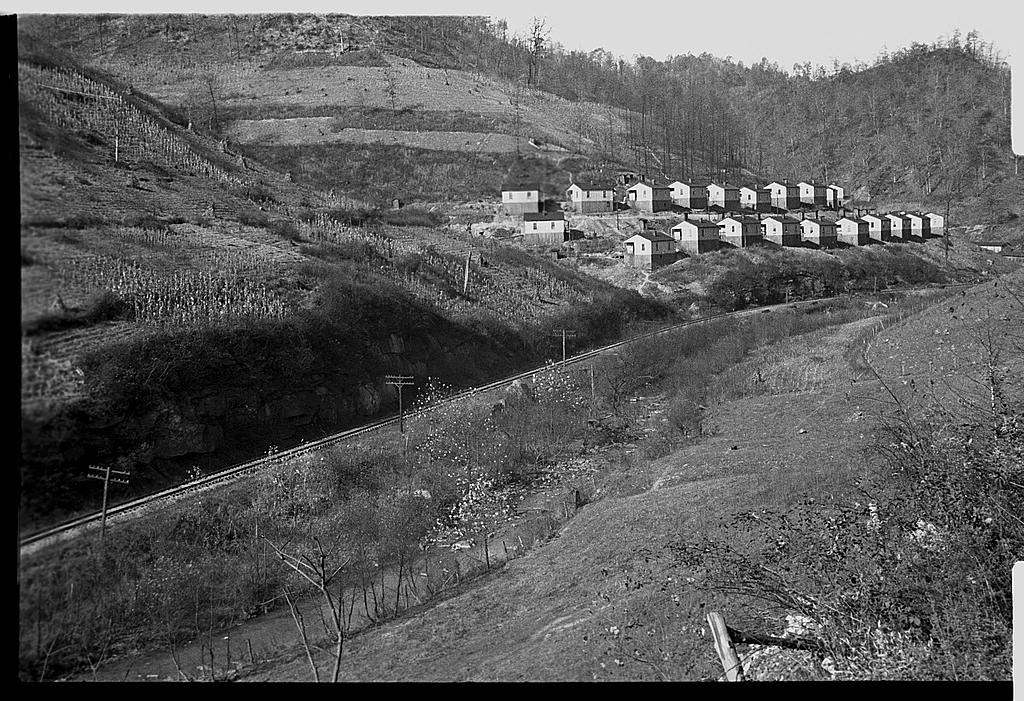
Coal camp houses in Jenkins during the Great Depression

In autumn of 1911, the Consolidation Coal Company purchased the current location of Jenkins as part of a 100,000-acre (40,000 ha) tract of land in Pike, Letcher, and Floyd counties from the Northern Coal and Coke Company. After the acquisition was finalized, plans were made to extend the Lexington and Eastern Railroad from Jackson to a town named McRoberts. The plans also included the establishment of the town of Jenkins for George C. Jenkins, one of the Consolidation Coal Company's directors.

Because of the need of hundreds of homes and other structures, nine sawmills and two brickyards were erected. A dynamo was built to temporarily generate power for the houses. Next, a temporary narrow-gauge railroad was built over Pine Mountain from Glamorgan, Virginia, in order to carry supplies to further the development of the town. Jenkins's city government was established as soon as the businesses and land were put up for sale. The company even went as far to supply the town with its own marshals to enforce the law. Jenkins was finally incorporated as a sixth-class city on January 9, 1912.

Jenkins was home to minor league baseball from 1948 to 1951. The Jenkins Cavaliers played as members of the Class D level Mountain States League. Jenkins played home games at the Jenkins Athletic Field.

Jenkins has been home to a Masonic Lodge Hall since October 16, 1912

In 1956, Consolidation Coal sold Jenkins to Bethlehem Steel. Bethlehem Steel closed the mine in 1988.

Diana Baldwin and Anita Cherry, hired as miners in 1973, are believed to have been the first women to work in an underground coal mine in the United States. They were the first female members of United Mine Workers of America to work inside a mine. Cherry and Baldwin were hired by the Beth-Elkhorn Coal Company in Jenkins.

During the Southeast Kentucky floods of 2020, water spilled over the top of the Elkhorn Lake dam above Jenkins, which is considered one of Kentucky's most dangerous. About 30 percent of Jenkins is vulnerable to flooding in the event of a dam break, and the town lacks a comprehensive emergency plan.

== Geography ==
Jenkins is located in eastern Letcher County at 37°10′48″N 82°37′56″W (37.179914, -82.632148). Its southern border is the Kentucky–Virginia state line, following the crest of Pine Mountain.

U.S. Route 23 passes through Jenkins, leading north 29 miles (47 km) to Pikeville and south over Pine Mountain 21 miles (34 km) to Norton, Virginia. U.S. Route 119 leads southwest from Jenkins 12 miles (19 km) to Whitesburg, the Letcher county seat, and north with US 23 to Pikeville.

According to the United States Census Bureau, the city has a total area of 8.9 square miles (23.0 km^{2}), of which 8.8 square miles (22.9 km^{2}) are land and 0.04 square miles (0.1 km^{2}), or 0.34%, are water. The city is in the valley of Elkhorn Creek, a northeast-flowing tributary of the Russell Fork, part of the Levisa Fork–Big Sandy River watershed flowing north to the Ohio River.

== Demographics ==
Historical population
Census	Pop.	Note	%±
1920	4,707		—
1930	8,495		80.5%
1940	9,428		11.0%
1950	6,921		−26.6%
1960	3,202		−53.7%
1970	2,552		−20.3%
1980	3,271		28.2%
1990	2,751		−15.9%
2000	2,401		−12.7%
2010	2,203		−8.2%
2020	1,902		−13.7%
2022 (est.)	1,830		−3.8%
U.S. Decennial Census

=== 2020 census ===
As of the 2020 census, Jenkins had a population of 1,902. The median age was 37.7 years. 24.4% of residents were under the age of 18 and 17.0% of residents were 65 years of age or older. For every 100 females there were 91.9 males, and for every 100 females age 18 and over there were 85.5 males age 18 and over.

0.0% of residents lived in urban areas, while 100.0% lived in rural areas.

There were 780 households in Jenkins, of which 36.2% had children under the age of 18 living in them. Of all households, 37.9% were married-couple households, 18.5% were households with a male householder and no spouse or partner present, and 37.1% were households with a female householder and no spouse or partner present. About 30.7% of all households were made up of individuals and 13.7% had someone living alone who was 65 years of age or older.

There were 952 housing units, of which 18.1% were vacant. The homeowner vacancy rate was 2.3% and the rental vacancy rate was 7.2%.

Racial composition as of the 2020 census
Race	Number	Percent
White	1,835	96.5%
Black or African American	13	0.7%
American Indian and Alaska Native	3	0.2%
Asian	4	0.2%
Native Hawaiian and Other Pacific Islander	0	0.0%
Some other race	3	0.2%
Two or more races	44	2.3%
Hispanic or Latino (of any race)	30	1.6%

=== 2000 census ===
As of the census of 2000, there were 2,401 people, 968 households, and 671 families residing in the city. The population density was 281.2 inhabitants per square mile (108.6/km^{2}). There were 1,122 housing units at an average density of 131.4 per square mile (50.7/km^{2}). The racial makeup of the city was 97.96% White, 1.08% African American, 0.08% Native American, 0.33% Asian, 0.08% Pacific Islander, and 0.46% from two or more races. Hispanic or Latino of any race were 0.29% of the population.

There were 968 households, out of which 31.7% had children under the age of 18 living with them, 52.9% were married couples living together, 13.2% had a female householder with no husband present, and 30.6% were non-families. 27.5% of all households were made up of individuals, and 12.9% had someone living alone who was 65 years of age or older. The average household size was 2.43 and the average family size was 2.97.

In the city, the population was spread out, with 25.4% under the age of 18, 8.4% from 18 to 24, 26.8% from 25 to 44, 24.7% from 45 to 64, and 14.7% who were 65 years of age or older. The median age was 38 years. For every 100 females, there were 92.2 males. For every 100 females age 18 and over, there were 83.7 males.

The median income for a household in the city was $20,143, and the median income for a family was $25,985. Males had a median income of $31,087 versus $21,333 for females. The per capita income for the city was $11,358. About 24.6% of families and 29.9% of the population were below the poverty line, including 43.3% of those under age 18 and 14.6% of those age 65 or over.

== Education ==
Jenkins has a lending library, a branch of the Letcher County Library.

Jenkins Independent Schools operates in the city. The district includes Jenkins and the nearby community of Burdine. The district operates two schools, Jenkins Middle High School and Burdine Elementary. The current superintendent is Damian Johnson.

== Arts and culture ==
The David A. Zegeer Coal-Railroad Museum is housed in town in a historic railroad depot.

Jenkins Homecoming Days is an annual festival usually celebrated in August.

== Notable people ==
- Kenny Baker, fiddle player and member of Bluegrass Boys
- Matt Figger, basketball head coach at Austin Peay University
- Darwin K. Kyle, Medal of Honor recipient
- Francis Gary Powers, pilot whose CIA U-2 spy plane was shot down while flying a reconnaissance mission over Soviet Union airspace; dramatized in Steven Spielberg's film Bridge of Spies
- Gary Stewart, country musician and songwriter
- Milt Ticco, All-American basketball player at University of Kentucky and early professional in National Basketball League
