= Martins Fork Lake =

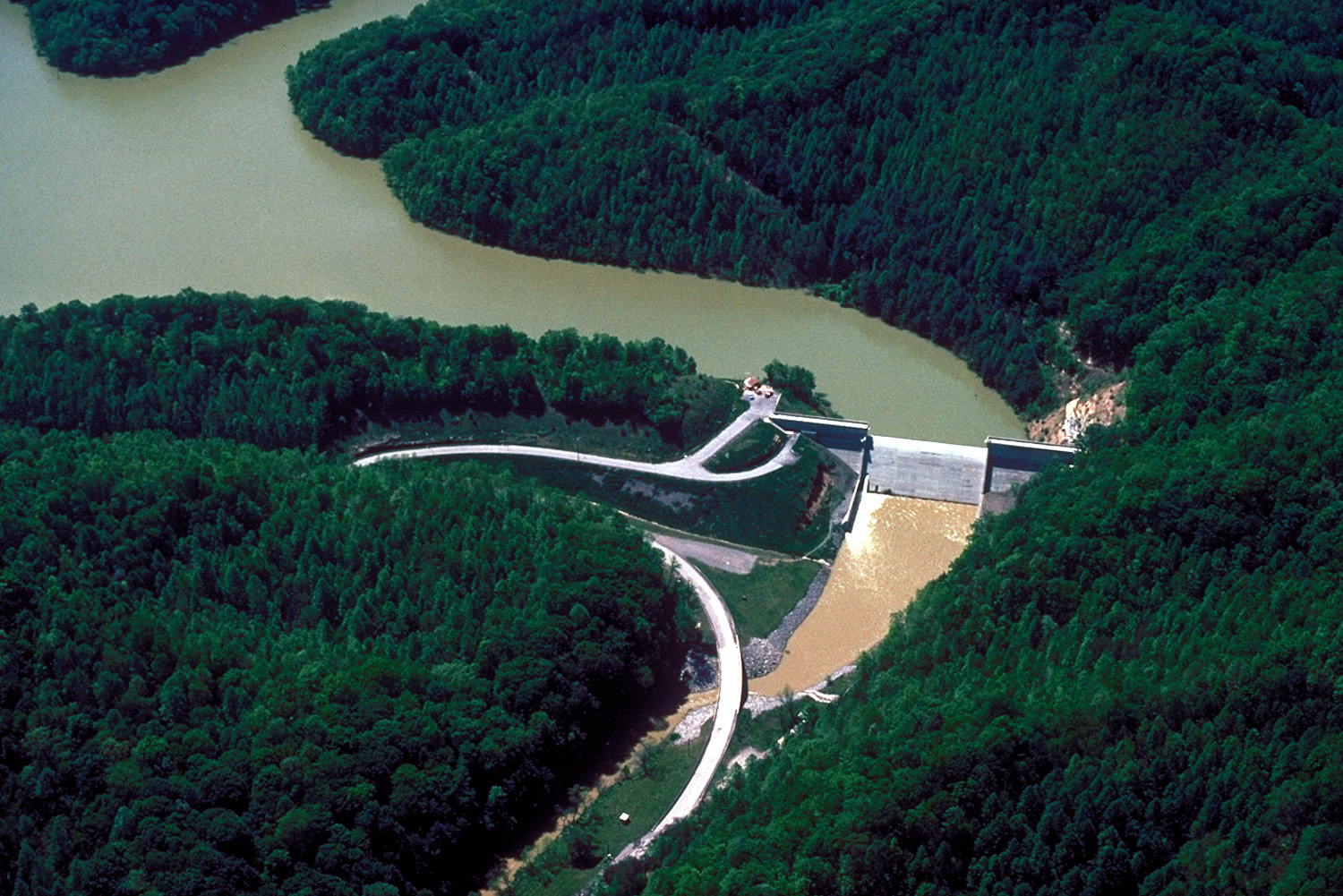
- Dam and Lake. View is to the west-northwest

- Location within Kentucky
- Location: Harlan County, Kentucky
- Coordinates: 36°44′45″N 83°15′48″W
- Type: reservoir
- Primary inflows: Martins Fork
- Primary outflows: Martins Fork
- Basin countries: United States
- Max. length
- Max. width: 2,570 ft (780 m)
- Surface area: 340 acres (1.4 km^{2})
- Max. depth: 45 ft (14 m)
- Surface elevation: 1,296 ft (395 m)

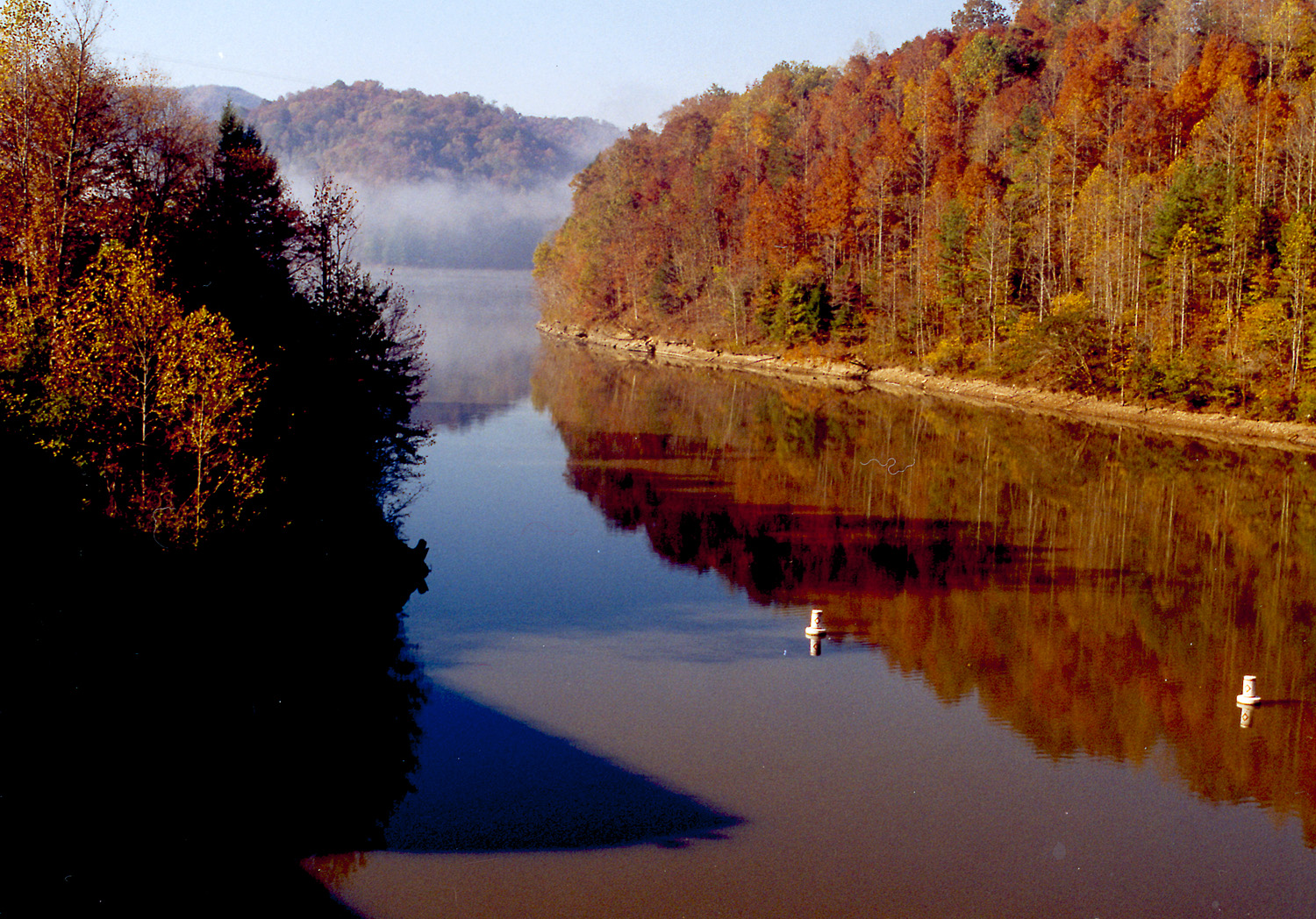
Martins Fork Lake

Martins Fork Lake is a 340-acre (1.4 km^{2}) reservoir in Harlan County, Kentucky. The lake was impounded from the Martin's Fork in 1979 by the United States Army Corps of Engineers. It is named for James Martin, an early pioneer in the area.
