= David A. Zegeer Coal-Railroad Museum =

- Location in Kentucky
- Established: May 9, 1998
- Location: 102 Main Street, Jenkins, Kentucky
- Coordinates: 37.172351°N 82.633617°W
- Type: Local History Museum
- Website: Museum website

The David A. Zegeer Coal-Railroad Museum is a local history museum located at 102 Main Street in Jenkins, Kentucky, across from the former Jenkins High School. The museum was dedicated on May 9, 1998.

The museum is housed in an authentically restored, 1911 train station which it shares with a bank. Included in the museum's collection are photographs of historic and modern coal mining, actual tools and other artifacts used by railroads and mines, and scrip formerly used in the company stores. All of the exhibits illustrate the history of Jenkins and the Consolidation Coal Company., and many of the exhibited items belong to local residents.
