= Pine Mountain (Appalachian Mountains) =

Ridge in the Appalachian Mountains running through Kentucky, Virginia and Tennessee

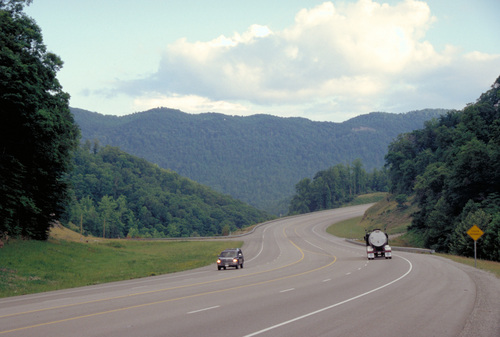
- US 23 in Kentucky with Pine Mountain in the background

Highest point
- Elevation: 3,273 ft (998 m)
- Prominence: 1,160 ft (350 m)
- Coordinates: 37°03′05″N 82°52′25″W

Geography
- Location within Kentucky
- Location: Pike, Bell, Harlan, Letcher, and Whitley counties in Kentucky; Dickenson, and Wise counties in Virginia; Claiborne and Campbell counties in Tennessee, U.S.
- Parent range: Cumberland Mountains

Climbing
- First ascent: unknown
- Easiest route: Hike

Pine Mountain is a ridge in the Appalachian Mountains running through Kentucky, Virginia and Tennessee. It extends about 125 miles (201 km) from near Pioneer, Tennessee, to a location near Elkhorn City, Kentucky. Birch Knob, the highest point, is 3,273 feet (998 m) above sea level and is located on the Kentucky-Virginia border. It has long been a barrier to transportation, as the Cumberland River at Pineville, Kentucky is one of only two waterways that pass through the entire ridge. The other is the Clear Fork (Cumberland River tributary) near Jellico, Tennessee.

Natural areas located on the mountain includes Pine Mountain State Resort Park and Kingdom Come State Park, Breaks Interstate Park, Kiwanis Raven Rock Park, Kentenia State Forest, Pine Mountain State Scenic Trail, the Little Shepherd Trail, Blanton Forest State Nature Preserve, Bad Branch State Nature Preserve, and several others owned and managed by the Office of Kentucky Nature Preserves.

Wildlife is abundant on Pine Mountain. The land is claimed to be the "Black Bear Capital of Kentucky." Black bears, elk, rattlesnakes, and deer are found on Pine Mountain.

== See also ==
- Pine Mountain Settlement School
- William Creech, Sr.
- Pound Gap
