= July–August 2022 United States floods =

Series of floods

July 2022 United States floods
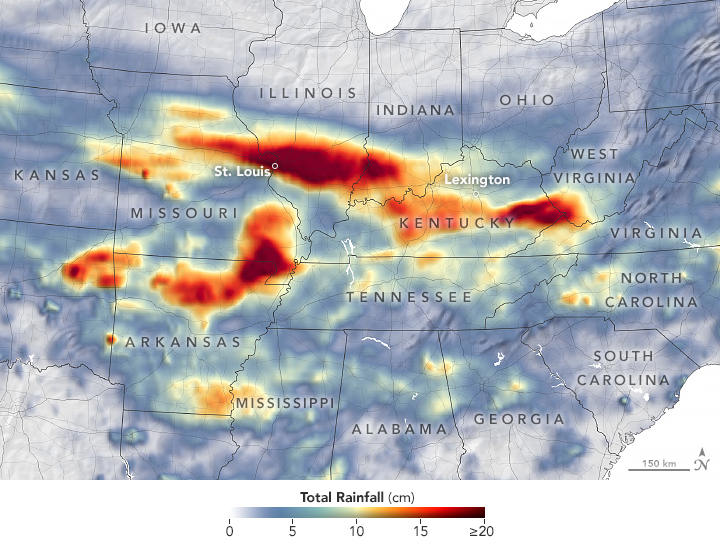
- Rainfall totals throughout the Midwest from July 25–31
- Date: July 24 – August 27, 2022
- Location: Greater St. Louis, Central Appalachia, Southern and Southwestern United States
- Deaths: 44 deaths (Kentucky: 38 direct, 2 indirect; Missouri: 2; Texas: 1; Utah: 1)
- Property damage: $1.2 billion (Kentucky and Missouri only)

Beginning on July 24, 2022, and lasting for a week, many flash flooding events hit several areas of the United States. These areas included parts of Missouri and Illinois, especially Greater St. Louis, Eastern Kentucky, Southwest Virginia, parts of West Virginia, and the Las Vegas Valley. Several rounds of severe thunderstorms began in Missouri on July 24, culminating during July 25 and 26, when St. Louis broke its previous 1915 record for the most rainfall in a span of 24 hours. Governor Mike Parson declared a state of emergency on July 26. Over one hundred people were rescued from floods, and two people were killed. Late on July 27 and into July 28, historic flooding began in central Appalachia, particularly in Kentucky, where a state of emergency was declared. A total of 38 people were killed in Kentucky as a direct result of flooding, with a 39th fatality occurring days later during cleanup efforts and a 40th coming in September during cleanup efforts in Pike County.

Late July 28, another unprecedented flash flooding event occurred in Las Vegas after parts of the city saw over an inch of rainfall. Much of the Las Vegas Strip became inundated, with roads, casinos, and parking garages being affected and flights being delayed or cancelled. More flooding continued from July 30 to August 1 in Arizona, including Phoenix and Flagstaff, California, including Death Valley National Park, and again in the same areas of Eastern Kentucky. In all, 41 people were killed during the flooding events: 39 in Kentucky on July 28 and 2 in Missouri on July 26.

More flooding events continued throughout August, impacting areas such as Death Valley, the Dallas–Fort Worth metroplex, and central Mississippi. A flash flood in Zion National Park in Utah led to one fatality. The Dallas flooding on August 22 led to an additional fatality and four injuries.

== Meteorological synopsis ==
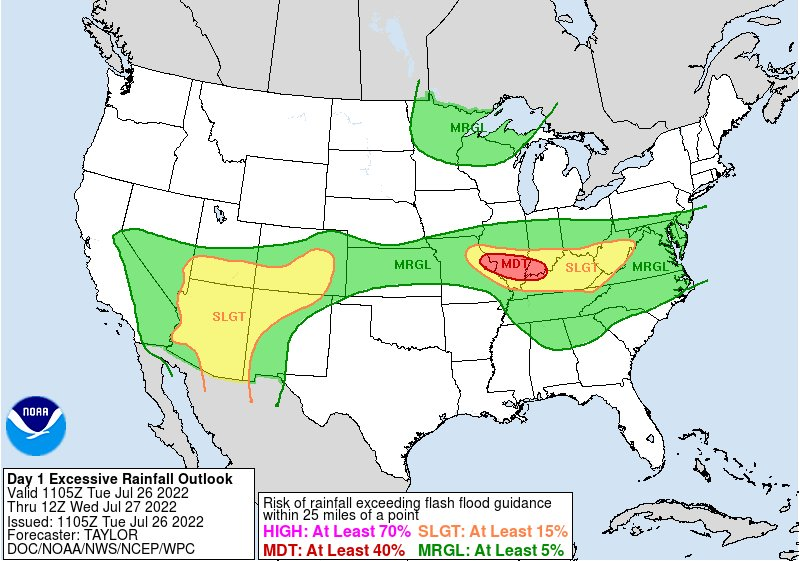
WPC Day 1 excessive rainfall outlook for July 26.

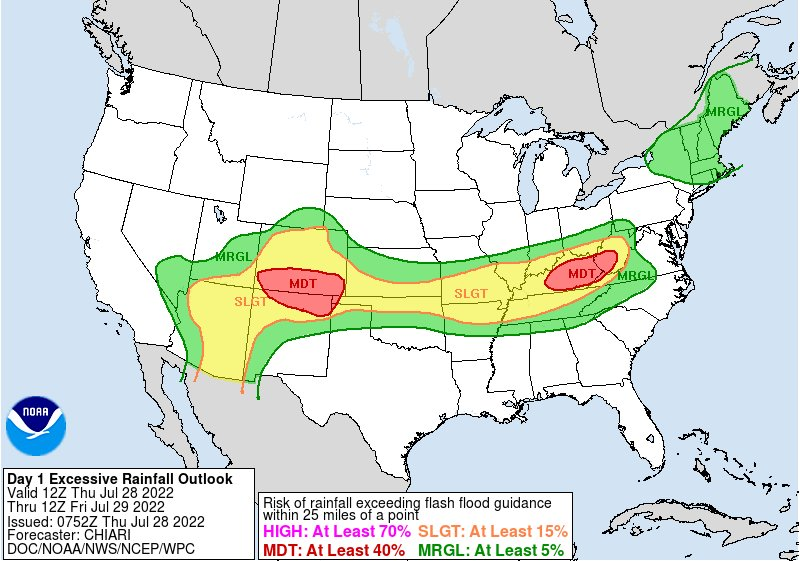
WPC Day 1 outlook for July 28.

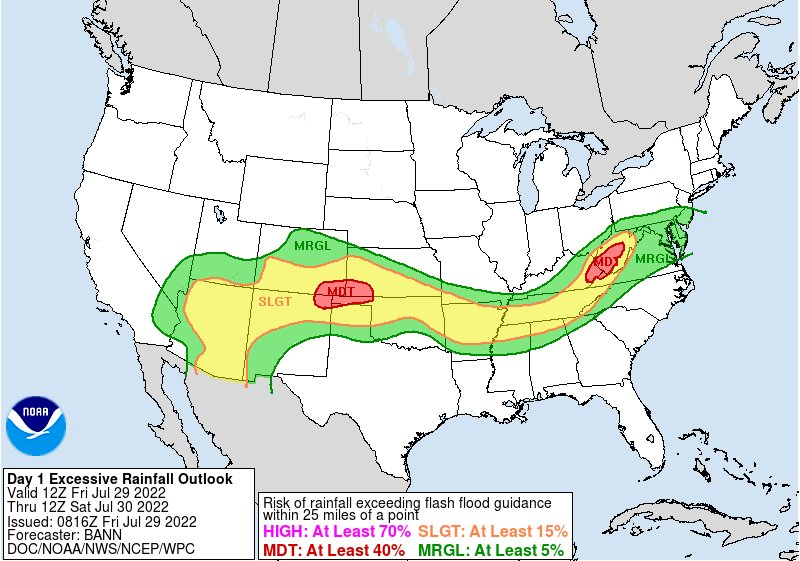
WPC Day 1 outlook for July 29.

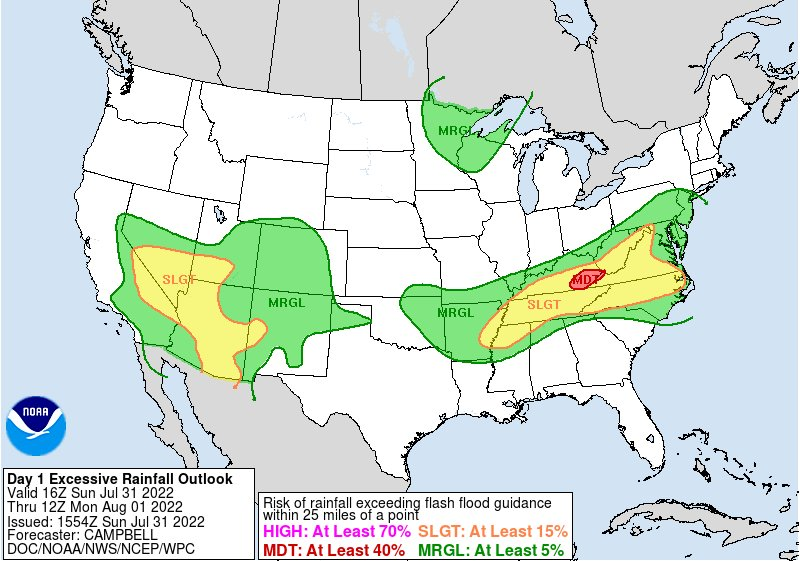
WPC Day 1 outlook for July 31.

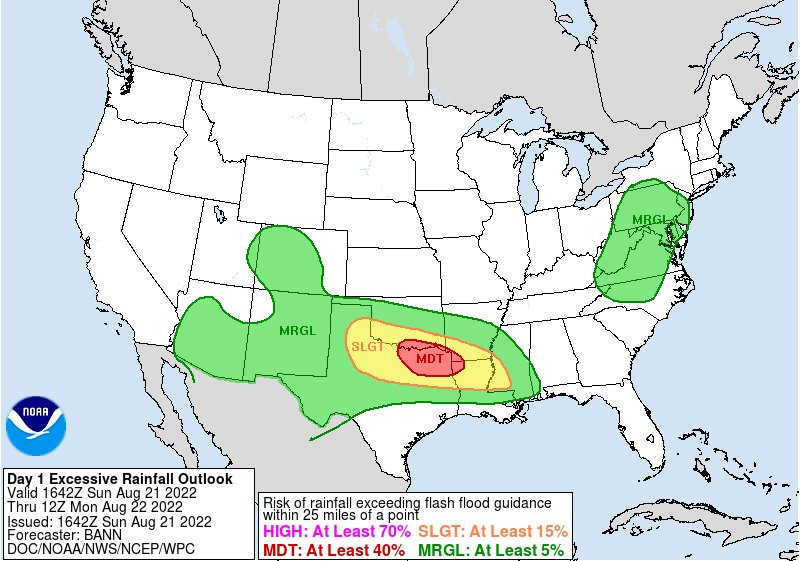
WPC Day 1 excessive rainfall outlook for August 21.

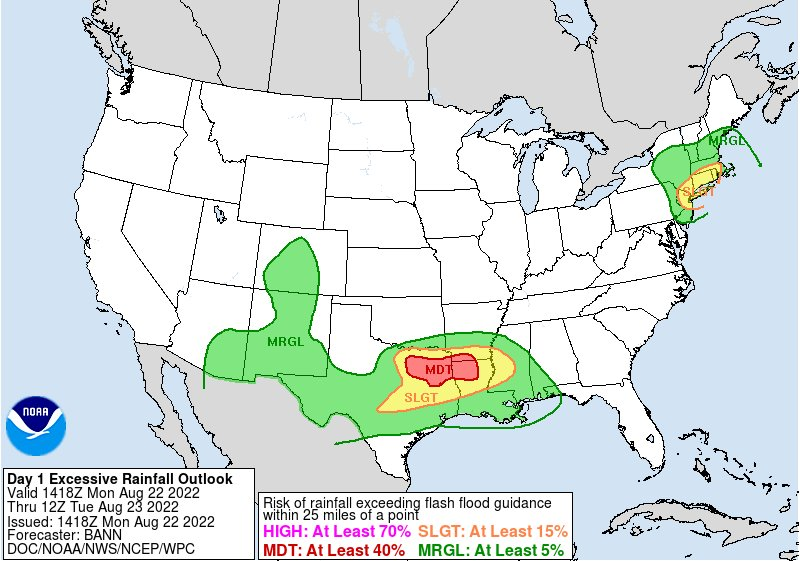
WPC Day 1 excessive rainfall outlook for August 22.

On the morning of July 26, the Weather Prediction Center (WPC) issued a moderate risk outlook for excessive rainfall over portions of eastern Missouri and southern Illinois and Indiana associated with an expected band of training thunderstorms over the region. Later, the National Weather Service issued its first-ever flash flood emergencies for Saint Louis. By the end of July 26, St. Peters, Missouri recorded a total of 12.8 inches (325.1 mm) of rainfall, while other areas of St. Charles County received over 11 inches (280 mm). Other parts of Greater St. Louis totaled as much as 10 inches (250 mm) of rain. Additionally, more than 6 inches (150 mm) of rain fell in the town of Mexico in central Missouri, with similar rainfall totals being reported in southern Illinois. Parts of Kentucky and West Virginia were affected by flooding on July 26 as well, including Johnson, Magoffin, and Floyd counties in Kentucky and Mingo and McDowell counties in West Virginia.

Training thunderstorms began to form over Eastern Kentucky during the early hours of July 27, producing heavy rainfall periodically throughout the day. Jackson, Kentucky had its second-wettest day on record (since 1981), with 4.11 inches (104.4 mm) of rain falling. During the late evening and overnight hours, a more substantial band of heavy rain and thunderstorms moved west to east along a stalled frontal boundary, resulting in subsequent extreme flooding across the counties of Perry, Knott, Breathitt, Letcher, Leslie, Clay, Owsley, Wolfe, Harlan, Johnson, Magoffin, Floyd, and Pike. Flooding was also reported in Southwest Virginia, in the areas of Wise and Dickenson counties, and the independent city of Norton, which are along the Kentucky border. On the morning of July 28, the WPC issued a moderate risk outlook for excessive rainfall over portions of Central and Eastern Kentucky and West Virginia. The rainfall began to move towards West Virginia and central Kentucky the following day, and began to encompass almost all of West Virginia on July 29. On the morning of July 29, the WPC issued a moderate risk outlook for excessive rainfall, but shifted it into Eastern Kentucky and almost all of West Virginia.

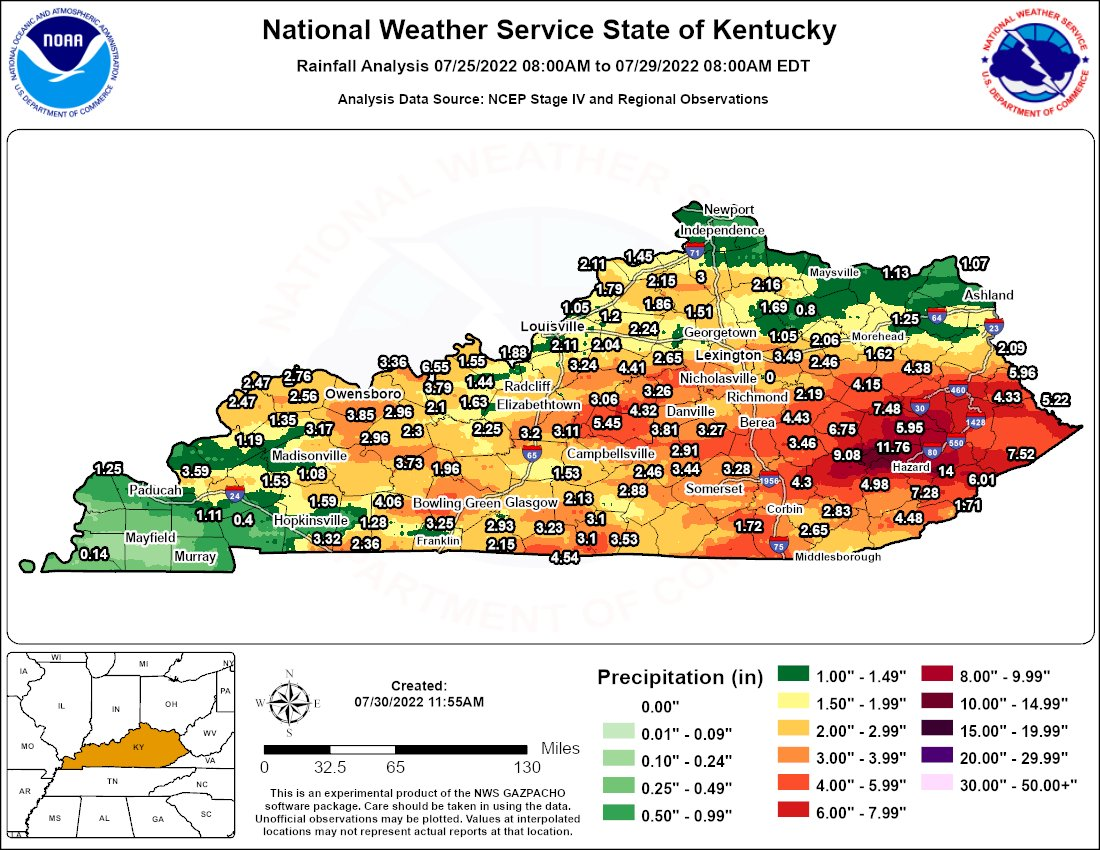
Kentucky 4-day observed rainfall analysis from July 25 to 29.

On the morning of July 31, a third moderate risk outlook for excessive rainfall was issued by the WPC over portions of Eastern Kentucky, with more flooding occurring that night over the same areas as four days earlier.

Elsewhere on July 30 and 31, Phoenix and Flagstaff, Arizona, along with rural areas of Arizona and southeast California sustained flooding due to heavy rain associated with the Southwest monsoon. Near Kingman, over 1 inch (25 mm) of rain fell in approximately 15 minutes on July 31, associated with widespread thunderstorm activity over both states and southern Nevada.

More rainfall impacted the same areas of Eastern Kentucky on July 31 and August 1, leading to renewed flooding in those areas, while areas of eastern Illinois, such as Jasper and Richland counties, picked up as much as 10–12 inches (250–300 mm) of rain from August 1 into August 2. On the morning of August 2, the Weather Prediction Center issued a moderate risk of excessive rainfall for parts of southern Illinois and Indiana and parts of western Kentucky.

Also on August 2, central Mississippi, including parts of Madison, Yazoo, Holmes, and Attala counties, received as much as 8–10 inches (200–250 mm) of rainfall, causing flooding that impacted roads and homes.

On the morning of August 7, WPC issued a moderate risk for excessive rainfall across portions of northeastern Iowa and southern Wisconsin.

== Impacts ==
=== California ===
==== July 30–31 ====
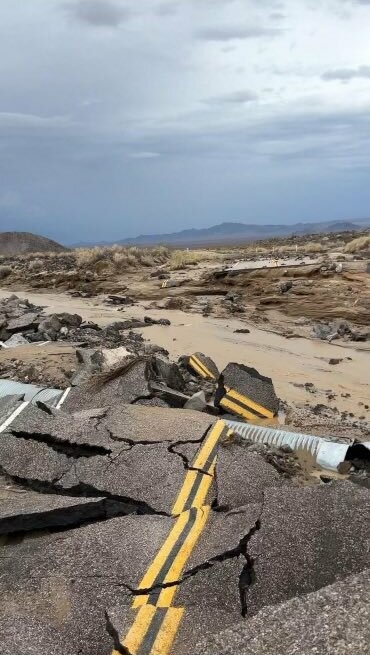
Road damage from flash flooding in the Mojave National Preserve on July 31.

In southern California, Death Valley National Park and the Mojave National Preserve were impacted by flooding on July 30 and 31, resulting in numerous road and campground closures and damaged/destroyed vehicles. Heavy rain in the San Bernardino National Forest resulted in mudslides that blocked roads near Yucaipa.

==== August 5 ====
All roads into Death Valley National Park were closed due to major flash flooding. Rainfall in Death Valley totaled 1.70 inches (43 mm), setting a new (since surpassed) single-day rainfall record; the amount was around 75 percent of the area's annual average precipitation. After the storm, the Federal Highway Administration gave $11.7 million to the National Park Service to fix roads in the park following the flooding.

=== Las Vegas Valley ===
==== July 28 ====
On the night of July 28, another flash flooding event occurred in the Las Vegas Valley in southern Nevada. Harry Reid International Airport saw 0.32 inches (8.1 mm) of rainfall in two hours, the monthly average for all of July. A ground stop was issued at the airport. Parts of Clark County saw 0.5–1 inch (13–25 mm) of rain, causing disruptive flash flooding. This heavy rain flooded casinos and parking garages along the Las Vegas Strip.

Just one mile away from the airport, the UNLV campus received substantially more rainfall, totaling over 1 inch (25 mm). Casinos on the Strip that were impacted included Caesars Palace and Planet Hollywood, with water pouring through parts of the ceilings into the buildings. Las Vegas Boulevard and Main Street, especially in downtown and the area of the Strip, were covered in water, creating traffic problems. Fire departments and first responders had 330 calls for flooding and swift water service, with seven people being rescued from floodwaters.

The seasonal monsoon rains in the area partially contributed to a water rise of 3 inches (76 mm) in Lake Mead from July 26 to 31, along with water releases from Lake Powell.

=== Arizona ===
==== July 25–30 ====
Rain beginning on July 25 in the Flagstaff, Arizona area associated with the monsoon season led to increased flash flooding concerns throughout the week, due in part to the burn scars from the recent wildfires. By July 27, Flagstaff mayor Paul Deasy had declared a state of emergency as numerous areas around Flagstaff had been impacted by flooding, including Mt. Elden Estates, Paradise, Grandview, and Sunnyside. Other neighborhoods such as Cheshire, Coconino Estates, Creighton Estates, Coyote Springs, Anasazi Ridge were later added to the state of emergency order. Schultz Creek overflowed in the area, resulting in the temporary closure of US 180 on the west side of Flagstaff.

On July 30, areas on the north side of Phoenix along I-17 received 1–2 inches (25–51 mm) of rain, mostly within one hour. This led to flooding of roads and low-lying areas and prompted four water rescues, two of which were from partially submerged vehicles. A voting precinct in Downtown Phoenix was closed by the Maricopa County Elections Department due to flooding in the building, forcing it to be relocated elsewhere within the building for subsequent days. Numerous streets in Phoenix became temporarily flooded due to the heavy rain. Several homes and apartment complexes became flooded as well.

=== Utah ===
==== August 19 ====
One woman was killed when she was swept away in a flash flood in Zion National Park. Her body was discovered on August 22 after a search involving over 170 people.

=== Texas ===
2022 Dallas floods
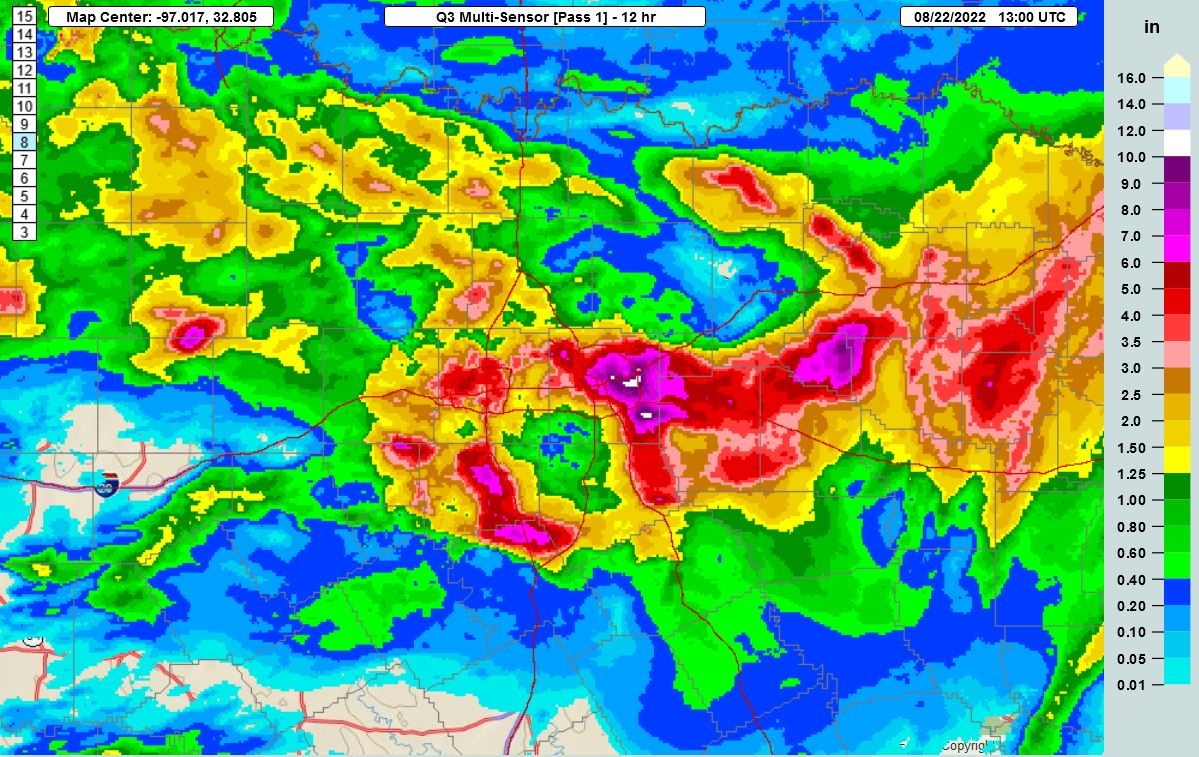
- 12-hour rainfall totals for the Dallas-Fort Worth Metroplex
- Date: August 21–22, 2022
- Location: North Texas, especially the Dallas–Fort Worth metroplex
- Deaths: 1 (4 injuries)

==== August 21–22 ====
Starting late on August 21, 2022, and going into the next morning, a significant flash flooding event occurred in the Dallas–Fort Worth metroplex in Texas, killing one person and injuring four others. Some parts of the metroplex saw over 10 inches (250 mm) of rain, which is the usual rainfall total for the area during all of summer. Before this rainfall event, 2022 was shaping up to be one of the hottest and driest years ever recorded in Texas. On the morning of August 21, the Weather Prediction Center (WPC) issued a moderate risk for excessive rainfall for North and Northeast Texas. On August 22, WPC issued a new moderate risk for excessive rainfall for North and Northeast Texas as well as portions of North Louisiana. At 1:20 am. CDT on August 22, the National Weather Service issued a flash flood warning for the Dallas metroplex.

Overnight on August 21, Dallas Fort Worth International Airport reported 3.01 inches (76.5 mm) of rainfall over a one-hour timeframe, setting the record for the most rainfall in a single hour ever for the airport. By 8 am. CDT on August 22, parts of the Dallas–Fort Worth metroplex had received over 10 inches (250 mm) of rain. The amount of rainfall that Dallas normally sees during all of summer fell within 24 hours, breaking a record for most rain in 24 hours since 1932 and making 2022 the wettest August in Dallas history. This also meant that, despite 67 consecutive days with no measurable precipitation during the summer, Dallas still had their 9th wettest summer on record.

The flooding event caused over 314 car crashes and 319 high water calls. Parts of the Dallas area got up to 15.16 inches (385.1 mm) of rain. Nearly 300 flights were cancelled and 900 were delayed between the two Dallas airports. Dallas Fort Worth International Airport, and 37,000 other customers, lost power. One person was killed and four people were injured in the floods. Certain rivers reached moderate flood stage as they reached over 38 feet (12 m).

Around 10:15 am. CDT on August 22, the storms associated with the flooding event produced an EF1 tornado that impacted Smith County, approximately 100 miles (160 km) east of downtown Dallas. Minimal damage occurred to a school and other structures near Winona. Due to the floods, drought improved across parts of northern Texas.

=== Mississippi ===
==== August 2 ====
Areas near Canton, Mississippi also received very heavy rainfall on August 2, leading to flash flooding that trapped people in homes in Madison County. Numerous people were rescued by fire department crews from houses and offices after some areas received up to 8 inches (200 mm) of rainfall in a few hours. Roads were closed due to high water, and vehicles were submerged along roadways and in parking lots.

==== August 24–27 ====
Parts of Central Mississippi received very heavy rainfall starting on August 24. Flash flood emergencies were declared, and up to 8.89 inches (226 mm) of rain fell. This led to severe effects on water systems near Jackson, leaving many residents without clean drinking water. At one point, the city temporarily ran out of bottled water to give to residents. During the storm, parts of I-20 closed.

These floods contributed largely toward August 2022 becoming the wettest August on record for Mississippi.

=== St. Louis area ===
==== July 26 ====
===== Missouri =====
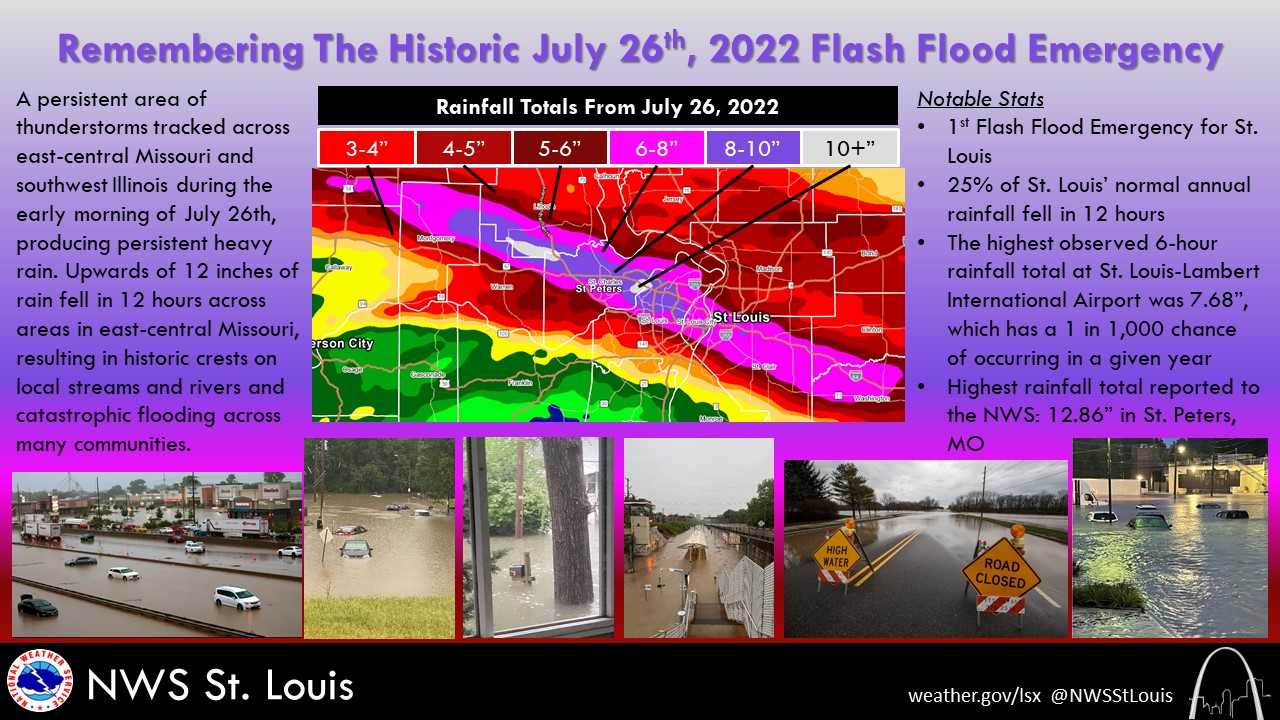
A graphic, from the National Weather Service in St. Louis, for the historic flash floods.

30 miles (48 km) of I-70 were closed because of the floods, with some vehicles completely submerged. The Gateway Arch was closed on July 26 due to the flooding. Flood damage to the MetroLink light rail transit system in St. Louis was estimated at $18–20 million. In St. Peters, ten puppies at an animal rescue shelter died in the flooding. Dardenne Creek in St. Peters rose over 21 feet (6.4 m) into major flood stage over the span of seven hours. The fire department in St. Louis rescued people from 18 homes, transporting some people and pets out by boat. Homes in Brentwood and Ladue were threatened by floodwater as well, with some residents evacuating. Two people were killed in the St. Louis area: one in a car that was found submerged in 8 feet (2.4 m) of water and another near Hazelwood found about a mile away from their abandoned tractor-trailer that had been flooded.

St. Louis set a new 24-hour rainfall record at over 9 inches (230 mm), beating the record of 7 inches (177.8 mm) from the 1915 Galveston hurricane. This included 7.08 inches (179.8 mm) in just six hours. Over 20,000 residents lost power.

===== Western Illinois =====
Flash flooding extended into Illinois along the I-64 corridor in St. Clair County, and a nursing home was evacuated in Caseyville. In Belleville, which received approximately 8 inches (200 mm) of rain, multiple roadways were closed due to high water, with a section of one street being washed away. Residents were assisted from two houses in town, and city parks sustained damage to parking lots, playgrounds, and bathrooms. Cahokia Heights had 15 to 20 homes with flood damage, along with more flooded streets, and Caseyville had a levee breach, leading to the evacuation of the nursing home. Other areas, such as East St. Louis and Swansea, had more flooded homes, while more communities escaped with only minor roadway flooding.

=== Central and eastern Illinois ===
==== August 2 ====
Parts of central Illinois received very heavy rainfall from the evening of August 1 into August 2. Numerous counties were impacted by flooding, with flooding reported near the cities of Decatur, Dawson, Spaulding, and Barclay. In downtown Decatur, numerous roadways were flooded, leaving vehicles submerged. Parts of Jasper and Richland counties received the most rainfall from the event, totaling 8–12 inches (200–300 mm), with rainfall rates reaching 2 inches (51 mm) per hour.

=== Appalachia ===
==== Kentucky ====
2022 Eastern Kentucky floods
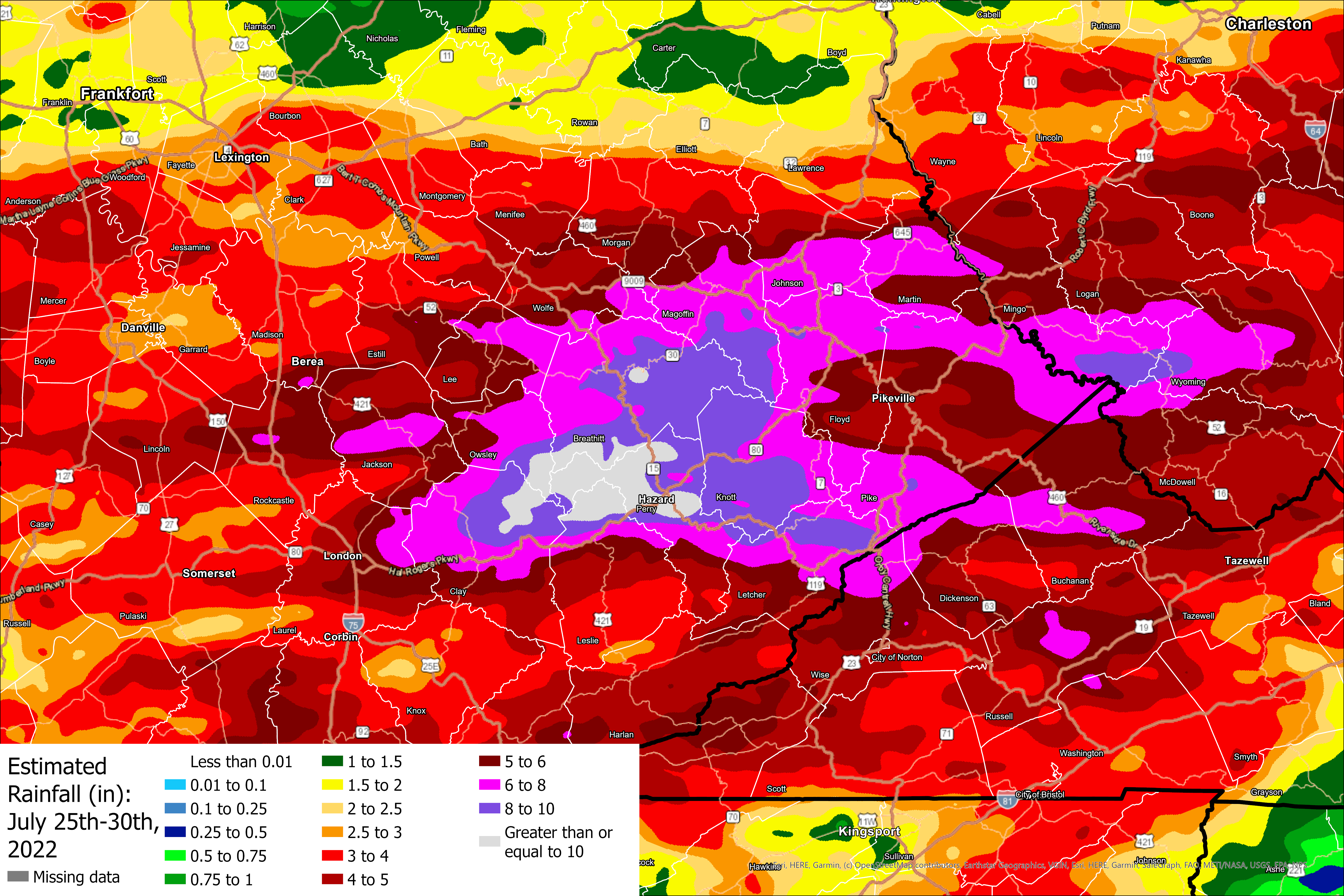
- Radar estimated rainfall in Eastern Kentucky from July 25 to 30, highlighting the counties that received the most rain.
- Date: July 26 – August 1
- Location: Central Appalachia (Eastern Kentucky, Southwest Virginia, Southwest West Virginia)
- Deaths: 38 direct deaths (+2 indirect)

===== July 28–29 =====
Governor of Kentucky Andy Beshear declared a state of emergency on July 28. after what was described as a thousand-year flooding event. The Kentucky Court of Justice closed the judicial centers in Floyd, Letcher, Magoffin, and Perry counties due to the extreme flooding. The storms dumped up to 10.4 inches (264.2 mm) of rain on parts of the state. Kentucky cities severely affected by the floods include Hazard, Jackson, Paintsville, Prestonsburg, Martin, Pikeville, Hindman, Whitesburg, Fleming-Neon, and Jenkins.

Many roads were shut down in these areas, including Main Street in Hazard, Mayo Trail in Pikeville, KY 317 in Fleming-Neon, and Lakeside Drive and Main Street in Jenkins. Evacuations were ordered in the downtown areas of cities that were severely flooded including Hazard, Fleming-Neon, Jenkins, and Martin. The North Fork of the Kentucky River set record high crests in Whitesburg and Jackson, and over 33,000 customers lost electricity.

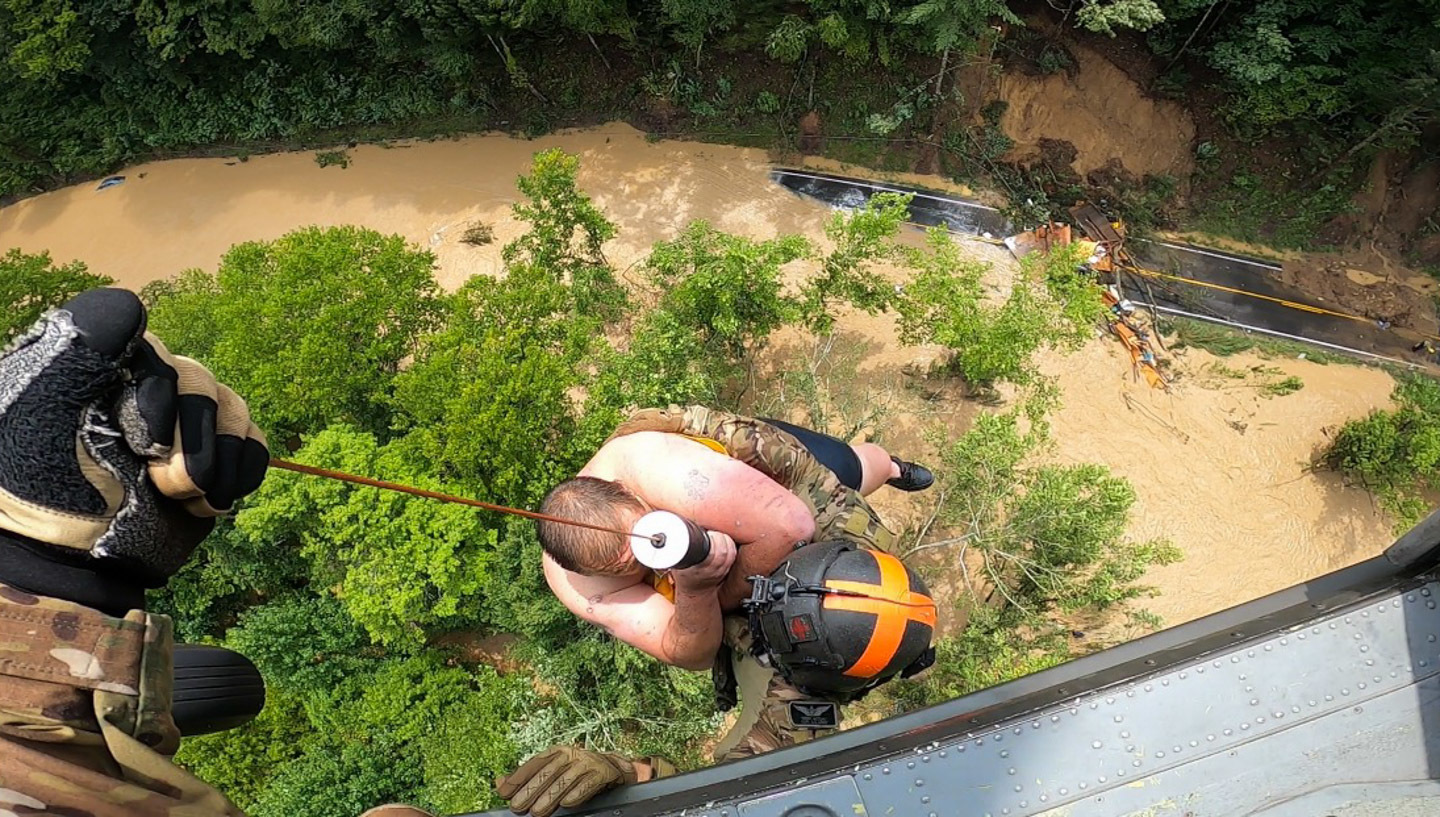
An airlift during the flood in Kentucky.

Late on July 28 and into July 29, part of the city of Jackson was evacuated and KY 15 was closed after officials became concerned that water from the North Fork River would top Panbowl Dam along KY 15 and potentially flood approximately 110 homes, 13 businesses, and other structures around Panbowl Lake, although the river began receding before the dam was overtopped. The North Fork River set a record crest in Jackson of 43.47 feet (13.25 m), besting the previous record of 43.1 feet (13.1 m) from February 4, 1939, while meteorologists at the National Weather Service forecast office in Jackson became trapped at the office due to nearby high water.

The rainfall observed over the region during the period of July 25–30 was over 600 percent of normal totals. The four-day rainfall totals of 14–16 inches (360–410 mm) in some areas were reported to have a less than a 0.1 percent chance of occurring in any given year.

===== July 31 – August 1 =====
More rainfall over waterlogged areas led to more flooding on August 1 in Knott and Letcher counties. Downtown areas of Hindman and Fleming-Neon were again inundated by floodwaters in the early hours of August 1. KY 550 was again flooded in Knott County, affecting the communities of Mousie and Fisty, along with Hindman. Flooding was also reported in other areas such as Floyd County, Pike County, and Harlan County. Roads in Floyd County were flooded or blocked by downed trees and power lines.

As a result of flooding on July 28 and again on August 1, Fleming-Neon was left with its city hall, bank, pharmacy, and post office flooded, with more than a foot of mud covering the inside of the city hall building.

==== Virginia ====
South Fork Road, South Mountain Road, Bold Camp Road, and Main Street in Pound, Virginia and portions of US 23 in Wise, Virginia were shut down in Virginia. Evacuations were ordered in the downtown areas of cities that were severely flooded, including Pound and Clintwood, Virginia.

==== West Virginia ====
===== July 26 =====
Flooding on July 26 impacted parts of southwestern West Virginia. In Mingo County, the Gilbert Creek area along the Kentucky/Virginia/West Virginia border had several homes impacted and several bridges washed out, limiting access to some areas. More flooding occurred in nearby McDowell County as well, in addition to other areas. This, combined with additional rainfall and flooding on July 28, led to a state of emergency being declared by Governor Jim Justice for six counties: Mingo, McDowell, Fayette, Greenbrier, Logan, and Wyoming. Partly as a result of the flooding, Huntington, West Virginia recorded their wettest July on record with 9.41 in (239 mm) of rain.

== Aftermath ==
St. Louis County declared a state of emergency in the aftermath of flooding in the area. On July 28, Kentucky Governor Andy Beshear commented, "We are currently experiencing one of the worst, most devastating flooding events in Kentucky's history." On July 29, President Joe Biden declared that a major disaster existed in Kentucky and ordered federal aid to supplement state and local recovery efforts in the areas affected by severe storms, flooding, landslides, and mudslides. On July 30, Urban Search and Rescue Missouri Task Force 1 was deployed to eastern Kentucky.

On July 29, Illinois governor J. B. Pritzker declared St. Clair County, including East St. Louis, a disaster area, and the city of East St. Louis later declared a state of emergency following the flooding on July 26.

A shelter was opened on July 28 at the Breathitt County Courthouse in Jackson for displaced residents, as well as other shelters in schools and churches around Perry County and Hazard and the Floyd County Community Center near the town of Martin. Wolfe County, north of Jackson, opened three school buildings as shelters as well. About 150 residents were housed at nearby state parks, while at least another 150 went to American Red Cross shelters. Curfews were established in areas such as Hindman and Breathitt County after reports of looting.

Some residents in Kentucky were stuck in their homes, unable to leave because of washed out roads and bridges, leading to over 420 people being rescued by helicopter or boat. By August 2, more than 5,600 customers in eastern Kentucky were still without power and more than 18,000 service connections were without water. An additional 45,600 customers were under a boil water advisory, according to Governor Beshear. Numerous people remained stranded in rural areas as a result of roads being washed away, with the only access in some instances being by ATV. The infrastructure problems caused difficulty in pinpointing the number of missing people in the days after the event.

The office manager of Troublesome Creek Stringed Instrument Company in Hindman set up a GoFundMe account for donations to help with flood relief, while Appalshop and Hindman Settlement School received help to keep valuable media archives refrigerated to prevent ruin. Some archives were transported to a freezer at East Tennessee State University in the days after the event.

School systems in Perry, Breathitt, and Floyd counties delayed the start of the school year due to recovery efforts. Several classrooms in Breathitt County were destroyed, along with the district's maintenance building and the bus garage. Several other counties in the area had modified starts to the school year as well.

The University of Kentucky men's basketball team announced plans to play two games against Gonzaga, in 2022 and 2023, to raise money for Kentucky flood relief.

== See also ==
- Weather of 2022
- 2021 Tennessee floods – A similar flooding event that occurred primarily in Humphreys County, Tennessee the year before.
- 2022 Montana floods – A similar flooding event that occurred one month before.
- 2022–2023 California floods – Flooding event that started in December 2022
