= Neon, Kentucky =

Neon, Kentucky may refer to:

- Neon, Letcher County, Kentucky
- Fleming-Neon, Kentucky, also known simply as Neon
