= Kentucky Route 343 =

State highway in Kentucky, United States

Kentucky Route 343
- KY 343 highlighted in red

Route information
- Maintained by KYTC
- Length: 4.225 mi (6.799 km)

Major junctions
- South end: KY 317 in Fleming-Neon
- KY 3409 in McRoberts
- North end: McRoberts Road in McRoberts

Location
- Country: United States
- State: Kentucky
- Counties: Letcher

Highway system
- Kentucky State Highway System; Interstate; US; State; Parkways
← KY 342	→ KY 344

Kentucky Route 343 (KY 343) is a 4.225-mile-long (6.799 km) state highway in the U.S. state of Kentucky. The highway connects Fleming-Neon and McRoberts, within Letcher County.

== Route description ==
KY 343 begins at an intersection with KY 317 (Main Street) in the western part of Fleming-Neon, within Letcher County. It travels to the east-southeast and curves to the east-northeast. It passes a U.S. Post Office before it crosses over Yonts Fork on the SP4 Robert "Bug" Smith Memorial Bridge. Here, it begins paralleling Wright Fork. The highway crosses over Wright Fork on the Lt. Col. Claude E. Hounshell Bridge. It curves to the northeast and crosses over the fork again on the Master Sgt. John K. Holland Bridge. It curves to the east-southeast and then back to the east-northeast before it enters McRoberts. It crosses over She Fork before passing a U.S. Post Office. It intersects the northern terminus of KY 3409 (Dunham Road). KY 343 crosses over Wright Fork twice more, on unnamed bridges, before it ends and McRoberts Road continues into the northeastern part of McRoberts.

== Major intersections ==
The entire route is in Letcher County.

Location	mi	km	Destinations	Notes
Fleming-Neon	0.000	0.000	KY 317 (Main Street)	Southern terminus
Fleming-Neon	0.081	0.130	SP4 Robert "Bug" Smith Memorial Bridge	Crossing of Yonts Fork
Fleming-Neon	0.461	0.742	Lt. Col. Claude E. Hounshell Bridge	Crossing of Wright Fork
Fleming-Neon	0.642	1.033	Master Sgt. John K. Holland Bridge	Crossing of Wright Fork
McRoberts	3.125	5.029	KY 3409 south (Dunham Road)	Northern terminus of KY 3409
McRoberts	4.225	6.799	McRoberts Road north	Northern terminus
1.000 mi = 1.609 km; 1.000 km = 0.621 mi
