= Hemphill, Kentucky =

Unincorporated community in Kentucky, United States

- Unincorporated community
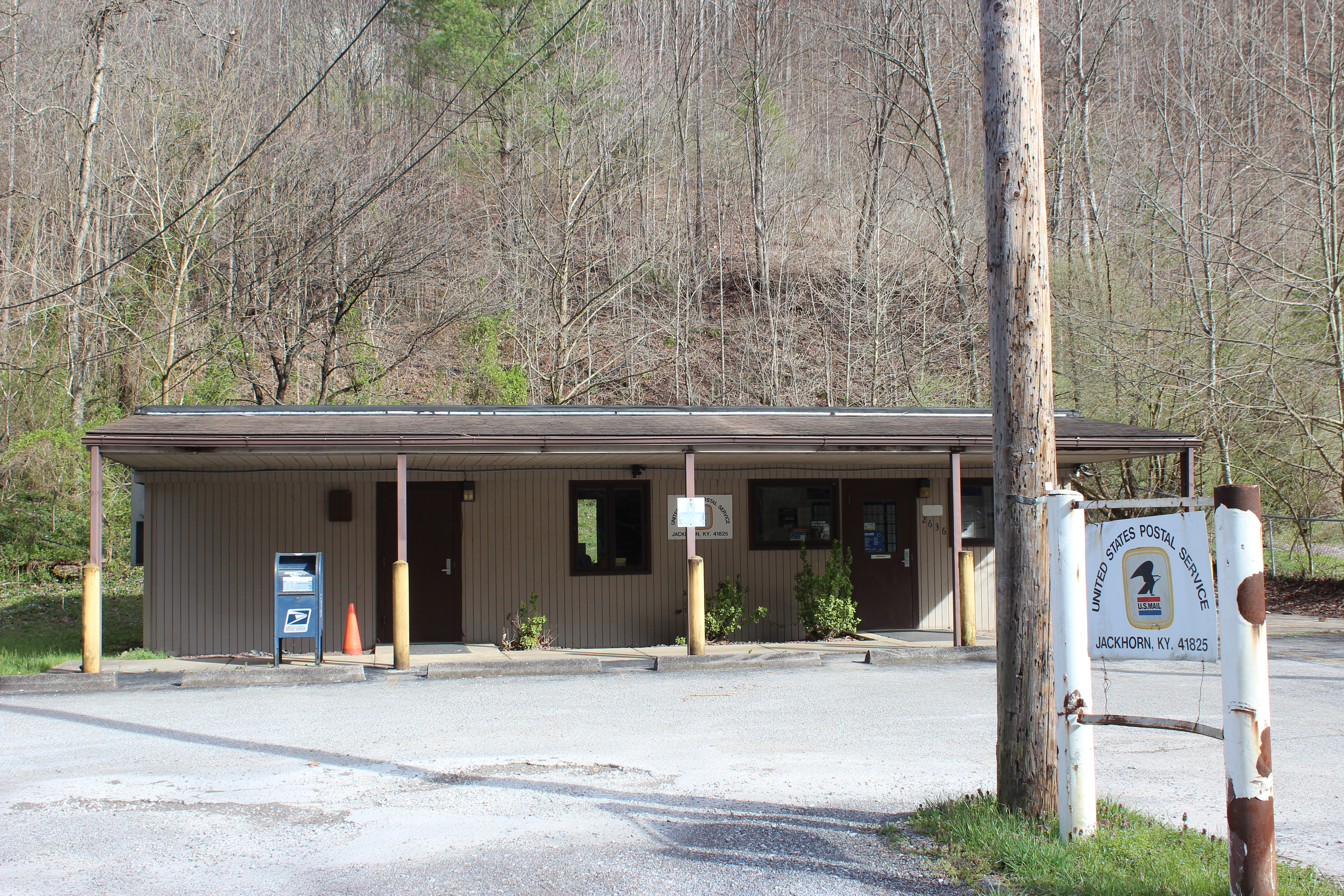
- Jackhorn post office

- Location within Kentucky Location within the United States
- Coordinates: 37°12′56″N 82°42′19″W
- Country: United States
- State: Kentucky
- County: Letcher
- Elevation: 1,378 ft (420 m)
- Time zone: UTC-5 (Eastern (EST))
  - Summer (DST): UTC-4 (EDT)
- ZIP code: 41825
- Area code: 606
- GNIS feature ID: 494020

Hemphill, also known as Jackhorn, is an unincorporated community in Letcher County, Kentucky. The community is located on Kentucky Route 317 1.7 miles (2.7 km) north of Fleming-Neon. The community has a post office with ZIP code 41825, which uses the Jackhorn name.
