= List of Morehead State University alumni =

This is a list of notable people associated with Morehead State University in Morehead, Kentucky, United States.

== Notable alumni ==
=== Athletics ===
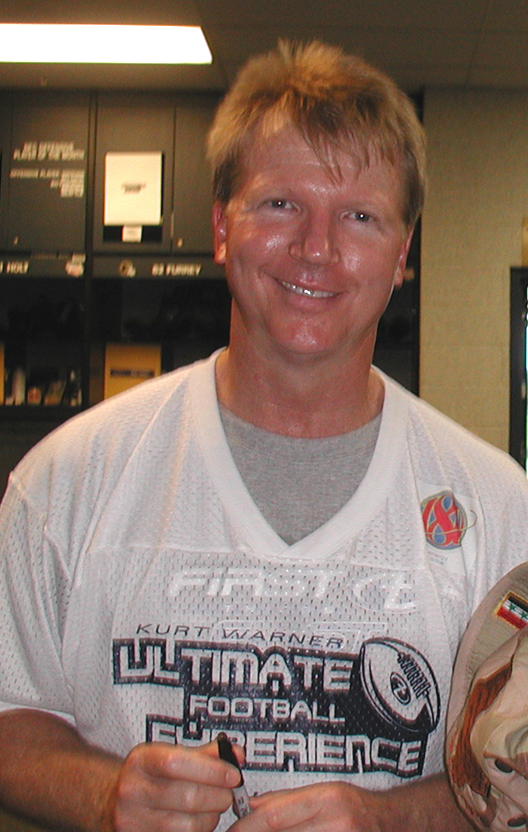
Phil Simms

- Henry Akin – basketball player, drafted by New York Knicks, became one of "Original Sonics" in Seattle, played with ABA's Kentucky Colonels
- Denny Doyle – MLB second baseman, 1970–1977
- Kenneth Faried – former NBA player for the Denver Nuggets, Brooklyn Nets, and Houston Rockets, selected 22nd overall in 2011 NBA draft
- Mike Gottfried – football coach
- Steve Hamilton (1934–1997) – baseball and basketball player; played in NBA finals and 2 World Series
- Demonte Harper (born 1989) – basketball player in the Israeli Basketball Premier League
- David Hyland – defensive back for San Jose SaberCats of Arena Football League
- Liz Johnson – bowler
- Kelly Kulick – bowler and first female winner of regular PBA Tour event (2010 PBA Tournament of Champions)
- Karam Mashour (born 1991) – Israeli basketball player in the Israeli Basketball Premier League
- Bob McCann – basketball player
- Jon Rauch – MLB pitcher 2002–13, Olympic gold medalist
- Phil Simms – NFL quarterback for New York Giants, MVP of Super Bowl XXI, 15-year pro career, football analyst for CBS; namesake of Morehead State's football stadium
- Dan Swartz – former NBA player with Boston Celtics
- Walt Terrell – MLB pitcher, 1982–1992
- Donnie Tyndall (born 1970) – basketball head coach, Tennessee, Southern Miss, Morehead State

=== Arts & entertainment ===
- Desi Banks – comedian
- Steve Inskeep (born 1968) – NPR Morning Edition host replacing Kentuckian Bob Edwards
- Steve Kazee – Tony Award–winning actor for Best Musical
- Terry McBrayer – 1979 candidate for governor of Kentucky, former chairman of Kentucky Democratic Party, attorney in Lexington, Kentucky
- Lori Menshouse – 1997 Miss Kentucky, 1999 Miss Kentucky USA
- Chris Offutt – writer
- Amber Philpott – news anchor
- Chuck Woolery – television game show host

=== Politics ===
- Nelson Allen – former Kentucky state senator
- John Blanton – Kentucky politician
- Dennis M. Cavanaugh – United States district judge
- Raymond Collins – politician and educator
- Jimmy Higdon – Republican member of Kentucky State Senate since 2009, businessman from Marion County
- Janet Stumbo – first woman elected to Kentucky Supreme Court
- David A. Tapp – judge, United States Court of Federal Claims
- Robin L. Webb – former Kentucky state representative (District 96) and current state senator (18th District) and attorney

=== Other ===
- Rocky Adkins – senior advisor to Governor Andy Beshear, former Kentucky state representative (D-District 99) and House minority floor leader
- William E. Barber – Marine Corps colonel
