= Fleming, Kentucky =

Fleming, Kentucky, may refer to:

- Fleming County, Kentucky, with its seat at Flemingsburg
- Fleming, one of the predecessor towns of Fleming-Neon, Kentucky
