= Barclay, Illinois =

- Unincorporated community
- Location within Illinois Location within the United States
- Coordinates: 39°52′29″N 89°31′04″W
- Country: United States
- State: Illinois
- County: Sangamon
- Elevation: 571 ft (174 m)
- Time zone: UTC-6 (Central (CST))
  - Summer (DST): UTC-5 (CDT)
- Area code: 217
- GNIS feature ID: 403891

Barclay is an unincorporated community in Clear Lake and Williams townships, Sangamon County, Illinois, United States. Barclay is located on Illinois Route 54 and the Canadian National Railway, 1.3 miles (2.1 km) northeast of Spaulding.
