= Kentucky Route 319 =

Highway in Kentucky

Kentucky Route 319
- KY 319 highlighted in red

Route information
- Maintained by KYTC
- Length: 6.9 mi (11.1 km)

Major junctions
- South end: KY 1056 near Ransom
- North end: US 119 northwest of Toler

Location
- Country: United States
- State: Kentucky
- Counties: Pike

Highway system
- Kentucky State Highway System; Interstate; US; State; Parkways
← KY 318	→ KY 320

Kentucky Route 319 (KY 319) is a 6.9-mile-long (11.1 km) state highway in the U.S. state of Kentucky. The highway travels through mostly rural areas of Pike County.

== Route description ==
KY 319 begins at an intersection with KY 1056 north-northeast of Ransom, within Pike County. It travels to the northwest, paralleling Hatfield Branch, and passes the Anderson Hatfield Cemetery before it curves to the west-southwest. It then curves to the northwest. The highway begins paralleling Blackberry Fork and passes Julius Scott Cemetery. It passes Blackberry Fork Park and crosses over the fork twice before traveling through Hardy. It curves to the north-northeast and enters Toler. It curves to the north-northwest and crosses over Churchouse Hollow and Pond Creek. The highway curves to the west-southwest and meets its northern terminus, an intersection with U.S. Route 119 (US 119). Here, the roadway continues as a local road.

== Major intersections ==
The entire route is in Pike County.

Location	mi	km	Destinations	Notes
	0.0	0.0	KY 1056	Southern terminus
	6.9	11.1	US 119 – Pikeville, Williamson	Northern terminus
1.000 mi = 1.609 km; 1.000 km = 0.621 mi
