= Kentucky Route 317 =

State highway in Kentucky, United States

Kentucky Route 317
- KY 317 highlighted in red

Route information
- Maintained by KYTC
- Length: 8.9 mi (14.3 km)

Major junctions
- South end: KY 805 in Neon Junction
- KY 343 in Fleming-Neon
- North end: KY 7 in Deane

Location
- Country: United States
- State: Kentucky
- Counties: Letcher

Highway system
- Kentucky State Highway System; Interstate; US; State; Parkways
| ← KY 316 | → KY 319 |

Kentucky Route 317 (KY 317) is a 8.9-mile-long (14.3 km) state highway in the U.S. state of Kentucky. The highway connects mostly rural areas of Letcher County with Fleming-Neon.

== Route description ==
KY 317 begins at an intersection with KY 805 in Neon Junction, within Letcher County. This intersection is just to the south of Fleming-Neon. It travels to the north-northwest, paralleling Wright Fork, and almost immediately crosses over the fork on the C.S.M. James C. Madison Bridge. Just on the north side of the bridge, it enters the city. The highway curves to the north-northeast, leaves Wright Fork, begins paralleling Yonts Fork, and intersects the southern terminus of KY 343. It crosses over Little Creek on the PVT Lonnie Meade Memorial Bridge just before it leaves the city limits of Fleming-Neon. It then crosses over Yonts Fork on the Specialist Leonard Fleming Bridge. The highway travels through Jackhorn before entering Hemphill. There, KY 317 curves to the north-northwest and crosses over Yonts Fork on the SFC Luther J. Potter Jr. Memorial Bridge. At this bridge, it leaves Yonts Fork and begins paralleling Quillen Fork. It crosses over the fork twice before it ends. The highway then curves to the north-northeast and becomes a curvy road as it travels to the northwest. KY 317 begins paralleling Stevens Fork. It intersects the western terminus of KY 1469 (Long Fork Road) just before it crosses over Rockhouse Creek and curves to the west-southwest. Here, Stevens Fork ends; also, the highway begins paralleling the creek. It then enters Deane, where it curves to the northwest and meets its northern terminus, an intersection with KY 7.

== Major intersections ==
The entire route is in Letcher County.

| Location | mi | km | Destinations | Notes |
|---|---|---|---|---|
| Neon Junction | 0.0 | 0.0 | KY 805 | Southern terminus |
| Wright Fork | 0.2 | 0.32 | C.S.M. James C. Madison Bridge | |
| Fleming-Neon | 1.0 | 1.6 | KY 343 north | Southern terminus of KY 343 |
| Fleming-Neon | 1.9 | 3.1 | PVT Lonnie Meade Memorial Bridge | Crossing of Little Creek |
| Yonts Fork | 2.5 | 4.0 | Specialist Leonard Fleming Bridge | |
| Hemphill | 2.8 | 4.5 | SFC Luther J. Potter Jr. Memorial Bridge | Crossing of Yonts Fork |
| | 6.8 | 10.9 | KY 1469 east (Long Fork Road) | Western terminus of KY 1469 |
| Deane | 8.9 | 14.3 | KY 7 | Northern terminus |
1.000 mi = 1.609 km; 1.000 km = 0.621 mi
