= Hoover Dawahare =

American businessman and politician (1928–2004)

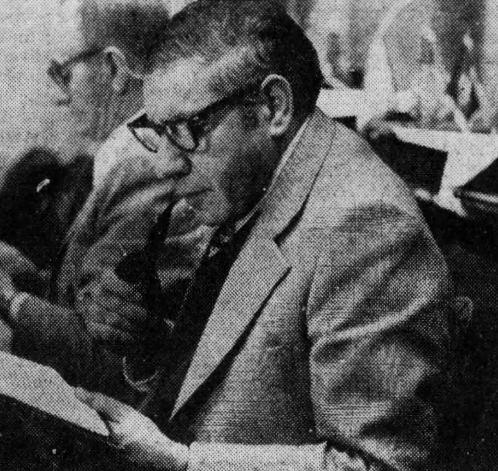
- Dawahare in 1974

Member of the Kentucky House of Representatives from the 91st district
- In office January 1, 1974 – January 1, 1987
- Preceded by: Chester Jones
- Succeeded by: Paul Mason

Personal details
- Born: November 2, 1928 Fleming-Neon, Kentucky, U.S.
- Died: March 16, 2004 (aged 75) Lexington, Kentucky, U.S.
- Resting place: Lexington Cemetery
- Party: Democratic
- Spouse: Dorothy Dawahare
- Children: 2
- Parent(s): Serur Dawahare; Selma Cury

Herbert Hoover Dawahare (November 2, 1928 – March 16, 2004) was an American businessman and politician who served as a member of the Kentucky House of Representatives from the 91st district from 1974 to 1986. He also served as vice-president of Dawahares, a chain of retail clothing stores.

== Biography ==
Herbert Hoover Dawahare was born on November 2, 1928, in Fleming-Neon, Kentucky, to Syrian immigrants Serur Dawahare and Selma Cury. His father Serur was the founder of Dawahares, a chain of retail clothing stores which operated in Kentucky, West Virginia, and Tennessee.

Dawahare was the founder of Hoovers furniture, and operated the business for over thirty years.

In 1973, Dawahare ran for a seat in the Kentucky House of Representatives against incumbent representative Chester Jones. Dawahare defeated Jones in the primary taking 3,244 votes to Jones 2,310 votes. Dawahare ran unopposed in the general election. He served until 1986, when he retired.

Dawahare died on March 16, 2004, in Lexington, Kentucky, at the age of 75. He was interred at the Lexington Cemetery in Lexington.
