= Paul Toth =

American baseball player (1935–1999)

- Pitcher
- Born: June 30, 1935; McRoberts, Kentucky, U.S.
- Died: March 20, 1999 (aged 63); Anaheim, California, U.S.
- Batted: Right Threw: Right

MLB debut
- April 22, 1962, for the St. Louis Cardinals

Last MLB appearance
- May 24, 1964, for the Chicago Cubs

MLB statistics
- Win–loss record: 9–12
- Earned run average: 3.80
- Strikeouts: 82
- Stats at Baseball Reference

Teams
- St. Louis Cardinals (1962); Chicago Cubs (1962–1964)

Paul Louis Toth (June 30, 1935 – March 20, 1999) was an American professional baseball player. A right-handed pitcher, he appeared in Major League Baseball from 1962 to 1964 for the St. Louis Cardinals and Chicago Cubs. He was born in McRoberts, Kentucky, grew up in Youngstown, Ohio, and was listed at 6 feet 1 inch (1.85 m) and 175 pounds (79 kg).

Toth was part of the "Brock for Broglio" trade on June 15, 1964: he accompanied outfielder Lou Brock and left-handed relief pitcher Jack Spring in a trade to the Cardinals, in exchange for starting pitcher Ernie Broglio, left-handed relief pitcher Bobby Shantz and outfielder Doug Clemens. Brock went on to help lead the Cardinals to three National League championships and two World Series titles — including one in 1964 — while setting a new career record for stolen bases. Toth, who was pitching at Triple-A for the Cubs at the time of the trade, remained in the minor leagues for the rest of his career.

The Brock trade returned Toth to his original organization. He began his professional career in the Cardinals' farm system in 1955, and made his major league debut with the Redbirds in 1962, pitching in six games, including one start, sandwiched around service with the Triple-A Atlanta Crackers. On September 1, 1962, he was traded to the Cubs for pitcher Harvey Branch, and made six more appearances for the Cubs, including four starts, before the 1962 campaign ended, with Toth winning four of five decisions and posting an earned run average of 4.62. Toth then spent the entire 1963 season on the Cub roster, appearing in 27 games played, 14 as a starter, and compiling a 3.10 ERA with two shutouts. Toth was ineffective in two May 1964 starts and was sent to the Salt Lake City Bees of the Pacific Coast League after only four total games in Chicago.

He remained in Triple-A for the rest of his active career, retiring after the 1967 baseball season. In 43 Major League games, Toth pitched 192 innings and gave up 177 hits and 54 bases on balls with 82 strikeouts. In retirement, he became a resident of Erie, Michigan. He died in Anaheim, California, of a heart attack during a family visit at the age of 63. Toth is buried at Riverside National Cemetery in Riverside, California.
