= Martha Carson =

American singer-songwriter

Background information
- Also known as: Martha Carson; Rockin' Queen of Happy Spirituals
- Born: Irene Amburgey; March 19, 1921
- Origin: Neon, Kentucky, U.S.
- Died: December 16, 2004 (aged 83)
- Genres: Country-gospel
- Occupations: Singer, songwriter
- Instruments: Vocals, guitar
- Years active: 1950–2004
- Labels: RCA Victor; Capitol Records; Cadence Records
- Website: Martha Carson Homepage

Martha Carson (March 19, 1921 – December 16, 2004), born Irene Amburgey, was an American gospel-country music singer most popular during the 1950s.

== Biography ==
=== Early life and rise to fame ===
Amburgey was born in Neon, Kentucky (since absorbed into Fleming-Neon). She and her two sisters were spotted by radio barn-dance impresario John Lair and invited to join the cast of the WSB Barn Dance in Atlanta in 1938. The Amburgey sisters were given the hayseed names of Minnie, Marthie, and Mattie. After Amburgey left the group and teamed with her husband, mandolin player James Carson, in the 1940s, the stage name stuck and she became Martha Carson. The duo performed (with Martha on guitar) as the "Barn Dance Sweethearts". By the time of her divorce from James Carson in 1950, Martha had begun making solo appearances on Knoxville's WNOX radio. However, she couldn't record because the Barn Dance Sweethearts' label, Capitol, had them contracted through 1957 and refused to let her go solo, instead trying to pair her up with other male singers.

She began doing session work instead, appearing on The Carlisles' "Too Old to Cut the Mustard" and other recordings by that group of unrelated performers headed by WNOX stalwart Bill Carlisle.

=== Height of her career ===
Things began to change after Carson met Fred Rose in Nashville. He helped convince Capitol to let her record alone, and in 1951 she made her solo-single debut with "Satisfied", a gospel song she had written in response to audience disapproval over her divorce. The combination of Carson's powerful alto voice and the song's propulsive handclap backbeat formed one of the blocks on which early rock & roll was built. The song featured backup by Carlisle, Chet Atkins, and Carson's sister, Opal, now known as Jean Chapel. Although the song was not a hit at first, it gained momentum continuously over the next several years.

By this time, Carson had written over 24 songs, and toured with country stars, such as Ferlin Husky, Jimmy Dickens, Moon Mullican, and Elvis Presley. After their performances, she and Presley sang gospel duets, and he later claimed that she had more influence on his stage style than anyone else.

In 1954, she married her second husband, Xavier Cosse, a pop music promoter. Thanks in part to her husband, Carson was able to acquire a recording contract with RCA Victor in 1955, for whom she released her first studio album that same year.

By 1955, Carson was living and recording all her work in New York. She had a series of minor hits that included "Journey to the Sky", "This Ole House", and "Saints and Chariot", a combination of two old favorites that Presley later covered in concert. After signing with the William Morris Agency in 1957, Carson and Crosse became full-time residents of New York, and she gained national exposure by appearing on The Steve Allen Show. She moved temporarily away from gospel-oriented music and toward citified country-pop, appearing on Tennessee Ernie Ford's television program and pursuing a style shaped in part by his big, low vocals and pop orchestral arrangements. It was a successful move for a time, but by the late 1950s, her star began to wane.

=== 1960–2004: Later career ===
She remained in the music scene during the later 1960s and 70s, writing and performing in Tennessee, but she did not record again until the Starday/Gusto company approached her in 1977, asking her to re-record some of her songs for a Greatest Hits album. Carson agreed, and also recorded some of the new songs she had recently written.

In the late 1970s, with her two sons grown, she began to devote more time to her love of music, playing many areas of the southern states. Audiences greeted her with great affection. She made appearances on Pop! Goes the Country and Nashville Now, and one of her songs was featured on an episode of the TV series Fame in 1983. Her comeback was cut short by the illness of her husband, Xavier. She went into retirement to care for him until his death in November 1990.

In 2001, Carson's 80th birthday party was attended by many country singers including Melba Montgomery, Sonny James, Kitty Wells and Stonewall Jackson (musician). On December 16, 2004, Carson died at age 83.

== Singles ==
Year	Single	US Country	US Pop
1951	"Satisfied"	-	-
