= Chester Jones =

American politician, educator, and businessman (1944–2016)

Perry County Circuit Court Clerk
- In office January 5, 1976 – January 1, 2001

Member of the Kentucky House of Representatives from the 91st district
- In office January 1, 1972 – January 1, 1974
- Preceded by: Raymond Collins
- Succeeded by: Hoover Dawahare

Personal details
- Born: April 27, 1944 Perry County, Kentucky, U.S.
- Died: April 7, 2016 (aged 71) Richmond, Kentucky, U.S.
- Resting place: Jones Family Cemetery; Lost Creek, Kentucky
- Party: Democratic
- Parent(s): Ashford Jones; Mable Rye Jones
- Education: M.C. Napier High School; Sue Bennett College

Chester Jones (April 27, 1944 – April 7, 2016) was an American educator, businessman, and politician who was a member of the Kentucky House of Representatives from the 91st district from 1972 to 1974. He was a member of the Democratic Party.

Born in Perry County, Kentucky, Jones attended M.C. Napier High School, and played basketball at Sue Bennett College. He was a teacher and basketball coach at Combs Elementary School and a teacher at M.C. Napier High School. In 1971, Combs was elected to the Kentucky House of Representatives, representing the 91st district. He ran for re-election in 1973, but was defeated in the Democratic primary by Hoover Dawahare. Jones was elected Perry County Circuit Court Clerk in 1975, and served until 2000.

In 2008, Jones was running for school board, and fellow politician Sherman Neace was running for magistrate. Together, the men spearheaded a scheme in the 2008 elections in which they accepted 7,500 to fund get-out-the-vote efforts, but instead of using the money for its intended purpose, Jones and Neace used the money to buy votes from 75 Perry County votes. In 2010, both Jones and Neace pleaded guilty and were convicted of mail fraud. Jones was sentenced to one year in prison, while Neace was sentenced to three years probation.

Jones died of cancer on April 7, 2016, at a hospice facility in Richmond, Kentucky. He was interred at the family cemetery in Lost Creek, Kentucky.
