= Raymond Collins (Kentucky politician) =

American educator and politician (1911–1994)

W. Raymond Collins

Member of the Kentucky House of Representatives from the 91st district
- In office January 1, 1970 – January 1, 1972
- Preceded by: Enoch O. Holbrook
- Succeeded by: Chester Jones

Personal details
- Born: November 5, 1911 Tillie, Kentucky, U.S.
- Died: July 26, 1994 (aged 82) Lexington, Kentucky, U.S.
- Party: Republican
- Parent(s): George Washington Collins; Mary Jane Brown
- Education: Carcassonne High School; Morehead State University

Willie Raymond Collins (November 5, 1911 – July 26, 1994) was an American educator, Old Regular Baptist minister, and politician who was a member of the Kentucky House of Representatives from 1970 to 1972. He was a member of the Republican Party.

== Biography ==
Born in Tillie in Letcher County, Kentucky, Collins was a descendant of John Quincy Brown, the first schoolteacher in Letcher County. He graduated from Carcassonne High School and attended Morehead State University. After graduating, he was employed as a schoolteacher in the Letcher County Public School District. He served two years in the U.S. Army during World War II. Collins was defeated in a race for a seat in the Kentucky Senate in 1967. In 1969, he was elected to a seat in the Kentucky House of Representatives, defeating incumbent Enoch Oliver Holbrook. He served until 1972.

Collins died on July 26, 1994, after suffering a stroke.
