= Williams Township, Sangamon County, Illinois =

Coordinates: 39°55′30″N 89°32′42″W

Williams Township
- Township
- Location in Sangamon County

- Sangamon County's location in Illinois
- Country: United States
- State: Illinois
- County: Sangamon
- Established: November 6, 1860

Area
  - Total: 42.94 sq mi (111.2 km^{2})
  - Land: 42.84 sq mi (111.0 km^{2})
  - Water: 0.1 sq mi (0.26 km^{2}) 0.23%

Population (2010)
  - Estimate (2016): 3,547
  - Density: 80.4/sq mi (31.0/km^{2})
- Time zone: UTC-6 (CST)
  - Summer (DST): UTC-5 (CDT)
- FIPS code: 17-167-81776

Williams Township is located in Sangamon County, Illinois. As of the 2010 census, its population was 3,446 and it contained 1,332 housing units.

== Geography ==
According to the 2010 census, the township has a total area of 42.94 square miles (111.2 km^{2}), of which 42.84 square miles (111.0 km^{2}) (or 99.77%) is land and 0.1 square miles (0.26 km^{2}) (or 0.23%) is water.

== Demographics ==
=== 2010 Census ===
2010 Census Race
Race	Number	Percentage (%)
White (non Hispanic)	3,265	94.74%
Black or African American	25	0.73%
Asian	13	0.38%

Historical population
Census	Pop.	Note	%±
2016 (est.)	3,547
U.S. Decennial Census
