= Dawahares =

American clothing store chain

- Company type: Retail clothing
- Industry: Retail
- Founded: 1918
- Founder: S.F. Dawahare
- Defunct: 2008
- Fate: Bankruptcy and liquidation
- Headquarters: Lexington, Kentucky, United States
- Number of locations: more than 20
- Area served: Kentucky
- Products: Ralph Lauren, Dooney & Bourke, Tommy, Michael Kors, clothing, footwear
- Owner: The Dawahare Family

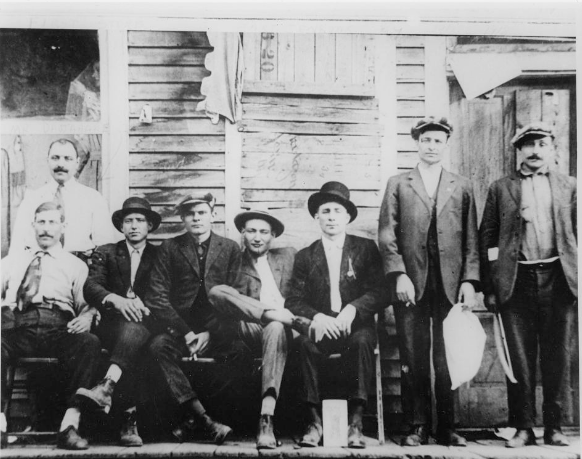
The Dawahare family in front of their first store in 1917. Company founder, Srur Dawahare, is standing in the back left.

Dawahares (pronounced DAW-hairs) was an American retail clothing department store chain.

Srur Frank Dawahare, a Syrian immigrant who arrived in the U.S. with only five dollars, Dawahare eventually walked from Harlan to Letcher County as a pack peddler. He established the original Dawahare’s Department Store in Neon around 1918, a business that anchored the town's economy for 71 years and grew into a significant regional chain.

== History ==
Dawahares was founded in 1918 in Neon, Kentucky, by Srur Frank (S. F.) Dawahare, an immigrant from Syria, and remained within the family for four generations.

In 1979, the company expanded into the Cincinnati, Ohio market by acquiring the five-store Martin's Town & Country chain. The chain operated nearly 30 stores in Kentucky, Tennessee, West Virginia, and Ohio.

It declared bankruptcy in 2008 and liquidated its 22 remaining stores.
