= Tillie, Kentucky =

Unincorporated community in Kentucky, United States

- Unincorporated community
- Location in Kentucky Location in the United States
- Coordinates: 37°10′51″N 82°51′50″W
- Country: United States
- State: Kentucky
- County: Letcher
- Elevation: 1,220 ft (370 m)
- Time zone: UTC-5 (Eastern (EST))
  - Summer (DST): UTC-4 (EDT)
- GNIS feature ID: 509212

Tillie is an unincorporated community in Letcher County, Kentucky, United States. The Tillie Post Office operated from 1890 to 1953.
