= Ransom, Kentucky =

Unincorporated community in Kentucky, United States

Ransom
- Unincorporated community
- Location within the state of Kentucky Ransom (the United States)
- Coordinates: 37°33′59″N 82°11′17″W
- Country: United States
- State: Kentucky
- County: Pike
- Elevation: 804 ft (245 m)
- Time zone: UTC-5 (Eastern (EST))
  - Summer (DST): UTC-4 (EDT)
- ZIP codes: 41558
- GNIS feature ID: 501575

Ransom is an unincorporated community located in Pike County, Kentucky, United States. Its post office closed in 1988.
