= Toler, Kentucky =

Unincorporated community in Kentucky, United States

Toler
- Unincorporated community
- Location within the state of Kentucky Toler (the United States)
- Coordinates: 37°38′14″N 82°15′9″W
- Country: United States
- State: Kentucky
- County: Pike
- Elevation: 679 ft (207 m)
- Time zone: UTC-5 (Eastern (EST))
  - Summer (DST): UTC-4 (EDT)
- GNIS feature ID: 505319

Toler is an unincorporated community and coal town in Pike County, Kentucky, United States. Their post office closed in 1965.
