= Neon, Letcher County, Kentucky =

Unincorporated community in Kentucky, United States

Neon, Kentucky
- Unincorporated community
- Location in Kentucky Location in the United States
- Coordinates: 37°11′29″N 82°42′49″W
- Country: United States
- State: Kentucky
- County: Letcher
- Elevation: 1,299 ft (396 m)
- Time zone: UTC-5 (Eastern (EST))
  - Summer (DST): UTC-4 (EDT)
- GNIS feature ID: 499263

Neon is an unincorporated community in Letcher County, Kentucky, United States. The Neon Post Office does exist. It was also known as Fleming-Neon.
