= McRoberts, Kentucky =

Census-designated place in Kentucky, United States

- Census-designated place
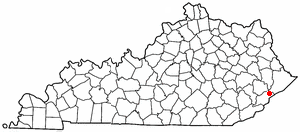
- Location of McRoberts, Kentucky
- Coordinates: 37°12′30″N 82°40′21″W
- Country: United States
- State: Kentucky
- County: Letcher

Area
  - Total: 5.61 sq mi (14.52 km^{2})
  - Land: 5.60 sq mi (14.51 km^{2})
  - Water: 0.0039 sq mi (0.01 km^{2})
- Elevation: 1,430 ft (436 m)

Population (2020)
  - Total: 741
  - Density: 132.2/sq mi (51.06/km^{2})
- Time zone: UTC-5 (Eastern (EST))
  - Summer (DST): UTC-4 (EDT)
- ZIP code: 41835
- Area code: 606
- FIPS code: 21-49278
- GNIS feature ID: 0497948

McRoberts is an unincorporated community and census-designated place (CDP) in Letcher County, Kentucky, United States. The population was 741 at the 2020 United States census, down from 784 at the 2010 census. McRoberts is in the Eastern Coalfield regions in Eastern Kentucky.

== Geography ==
McRoberts is located in northeastern Letcher County at 37°12′30″N 82°40′21″W. It is bordered to the southwest by the city of Fleming-Neon and to the southeast by the city of Jenkins.

According to the United States Census Bureau, the CDP has a total area of 5.6 square miles (14.5 km^{2}), of which 1.70 acres (6,881 m^{2}), or 0.05%, are water. The community is in the valley of the Wright Fork, a headwater tributary of the North Fork of the Kentucky River.

== Demographics ==
Historical population
Census	Pop.	Note	%±
2000	921		—
2010	784		−14.9%
2020	741		−5.5%
U.S. Decennial Census

As of the census of 2000, there were 921 people, 359 households, and 272 families residing in the CDP. The population density was 169.2 inhabitants per square mile (65.3/km^{2}). There were 397 housing units at an average density of 73.0 per square mile (28.2/km^{2}). The racial makeup of the CDP was 93.16% White, 6.08% African American, 0.11% Native American, and 0.65% from two or more races. Hispanic or Latino of any race were 0.87% of the population.

There were 359 households, out of which 36.5% had children under the age of 18 living with them, 57.4% were married couples living together, 13.6% had a female householder with no husband present, and 24.2% were non-families. 22.8% of all households were made up of individuals, and 11.4% had someone living alone who was 65 years of age or older. The average household size was 2.57 and the average family size was 3.04.

In the CDP, the population was spread out, with 25.6% under the age of 18, 9.2% from 18 to 24, 25.8% from 25 to 44, 25.1% from 45 to 64, and 14.2% who were 65 years of age or older. The median age was 38 years. For every 100 females, there were 99.4 males. For every 100 females age 18 and over, there were 99.1 males.

The median income for a household in the CDP was $18,333, and the median income for a family was $19,635. Males had a median income of $29,479 versus $18,438 for females. The per capita income for the CDP was $10,531. About 28.0% of families and 33.6% of the population were below the poverty line, including 48.5% of those under age 18 and 20.8% of those age 65 or over.

== Notable people ==
Paul Toth, a major league pitcher in the 1960s, was born in McRoberts, although he grew up in Youngstown, Ohio.
