= Spaulding, Illinois =

Spaulding
- Village
- Location of Spaulding in Sangamon County, Illinois.
- Coordinates: 39°51′58″N 89°32′42″W
- Country: United States
- State: Illinois
- County: Sangamon

Area
  - Total: 0.75 sq mi (1.94 km^{2})
  - Land: 0.75 sq mi (1.94 km^{2})
  - Water: 0 sq mi (0.00 km^{2})
- Elevation: 581 ft (177 m)

Population (2020)
  - Total: 801
  - Density: 1,067.7/sq mi (412.25/km^{2})
- Time zone: UTC-6 (CST)
  - Summer (DST): UTC-5 (CDT)
- ZIP code: 62561
- Area code: 217
- FIPS code: 17-71474
- GNIS feature ID: 2399869
- Website: www.villageofspaulding.com

Spaulding is a village in Sangamon County, Illinois, United States. As of the 2020 census, Spaulding had a population of 801. It is part of the Springfield, Illinois Metropolitan Statistical Area. Spaulding is in the Riverton School District #14.

== Geography ==
According to the 2010 census, Spaulding has a total area of 0.792 square miles (2.05 km^{2}), of which 0.79 square miles (2.05 km^{2}) (or 99.75%) is land and 0.002 square miles (0.01 km^{2}) (or 0.25%) is water.

== Demographics ==
Historical population
Census	Pop.	Note	%±
1910	308		—
1920	237		−23.1%
1930	187		−21.1%
1940	209		11.8%
1950	211		1.0%
1960	178		−15.6%
1970	220		23.6%
1980	428		94.5%
1990	440		2.8%
2000	941		113.9%
2010	873		−7.2%
2020	801		−8.2%
U.S. Decennial Census

As of the census of 2000, there were 559 people, 189 households, and 154 families residing in the village. The population density was 719.4 inhabitants per square mile (277.8/km^{2}). There were 195 housing units at an average density of 251.0 per square mile (96.9/km^{2}). The racial makeup of the village was 98.57% White, 0.72% Native American, 0.18% from other races, and 0.54% from two or more races. Hispanic or Latino of any race were 0.89% of the population.

There were 189 households, out of which 41.3% had children under the age of 18 living with them, 69.8% were married couples living together, 8.5% had a female householder with no husband present, and 18.5% were non-families. 13.8% of all households were made up of individuals, and 3.2% had someone living alone who was 65 years of age or older. The average household size was 2.96 and the average family size was 3.26.

In the village, the population was spread out, with 30.2% under the age of 18, 7.0% from 18 to 24, 29.5% from 25 to 44, 27.5% from 45 to 64, and 5.7% who were 65 years of age or older. The median age was 36 years. For every 100 females, there were 101.1 males. For every 100 females age 18 and over, there were 92.1 males.

The median income for a household in the village was $67,083, and the median income for a family was $70,455. Males had a median income of $44,375 versus $30,625 for females. The per capita income for the village was $21,168. About 3.3% of families and 5.1% of the population were below the poverty line, including 8.9% of those under age 18 and none of those age 65 or over.

== Notable people ==
- Justin Allgaier – NASCAR driver
