= Fleming-Neon, Kentucky =

- City
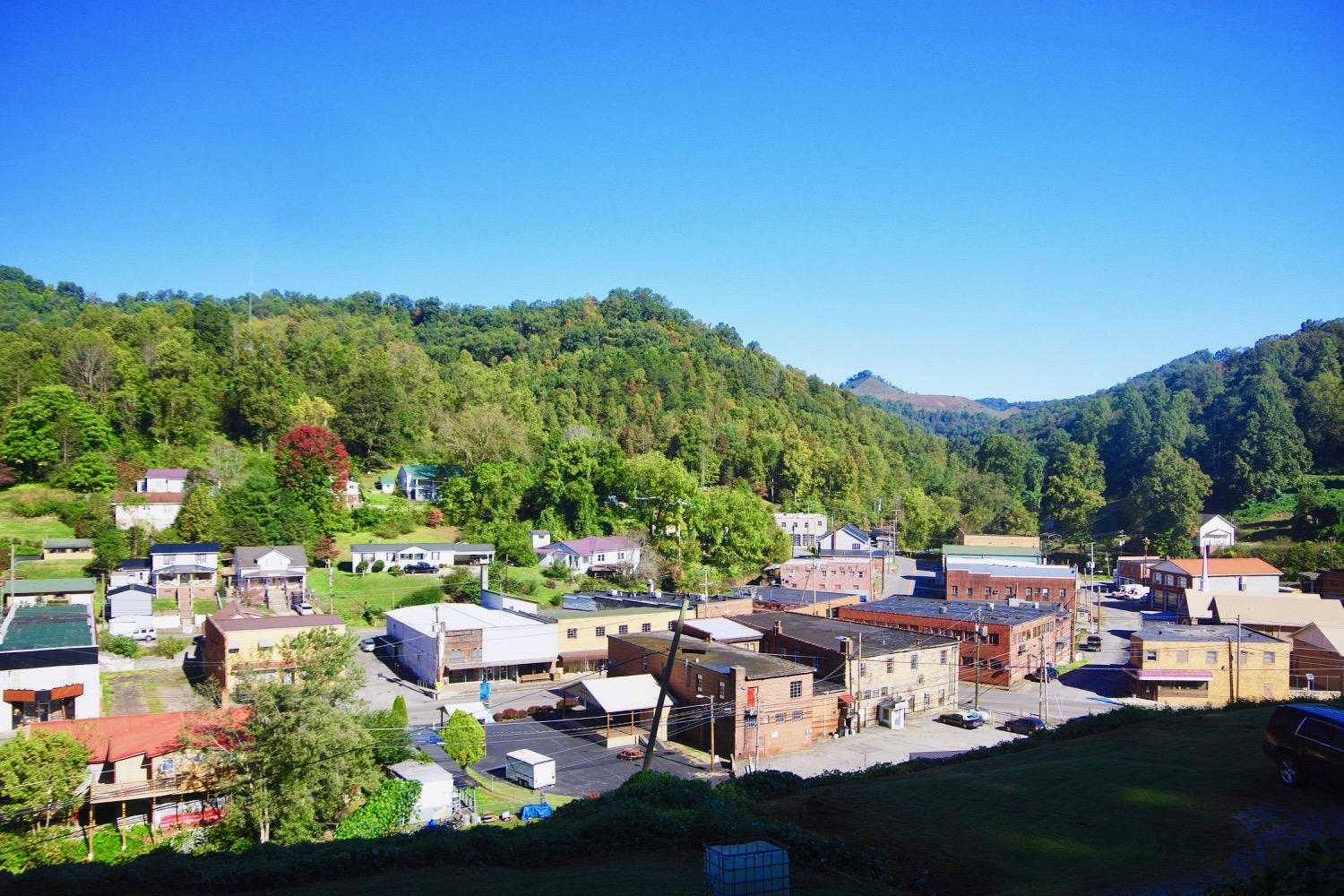
- Fleming-Neon

- Location in Letcher County, Kentucky
- Coordinates: 37°11′40″N 82°42′21″W
- Country: United States
- State: Kentucky
- County: Letcher
- Established (merger): July 7, 1977

Government
  - Type: Mayor-Council
  - Mayor: Ricky Burke

Area
  - Total: 1.61 sq mi (4.18 km^{2})
  - Land: 1.61 sq mi (4.18 km^{2})
  - Water: 0 sq mi (0.00 km^{2})
- Elevation: 1,391 ft (424 m)

Population (2020)
  - Total: 548
  - Density: 339.4/sq mi (131.03/km^{2})
- Time zone: UTC-5 (Eastern (EST))
  - Summer (DST): UTC-4 (EDT)
- ZIP code: 41840
- Area code: 606
- FIPS code: 21-27846
- GNIS feature ID: 1681811

Fleming-Neon also known as Neon, is a home rule-class city in Letcher County, Kentucky, in the United States. As of the 2020 census, Fleming-Neon had a population of 548.

== History ==
=== Early history and development of Neon ===
The area that became Neon was originally known as Chip, which served as a lumber yard and storage site for yellow poplar. A post office operated under the name "Chip" from 1902 until 1915. Unlike many surrounding "company towns," Neon was developed by the Letcher Coal and Development Company (also known as the Letcher County Coal and Improvement Company), a local enterprise founded by businessmen from Whitesburg. In 1910, James H. Frazier purchased the 31-acre site from Robert Younts for $3,100.

The developers marketed the town as the "hub" of the Boone's Fork coal fields, selling building and residence lots through public auctions starting in February 1914. Following a period of noted lawlessness, the town was formally incorporated in August 1916 by order of Judge John F. Butler.

=== Naming of Neon ===
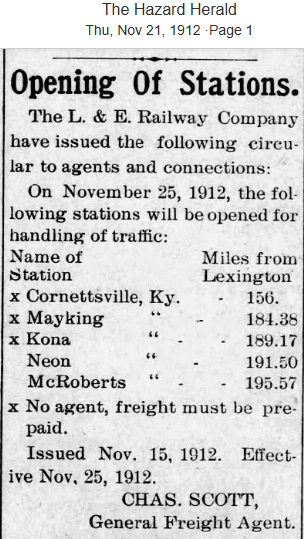
Announcement from the L&E Railway Company of the opening of new stations throughout Kentucky. Including Cornettsville, Mayking, Kona, Neon, and McRoberts. Issued on November 15, 1912.

Local folklore long maintained that the name "Neon" originated from a train conductor shouting "Knee On" to passengers boarding via a stump. However, primary source records debunk this myth, as the name "Neon" appeared in newspaper reports (The Hazard Herald) as early as November 15, 1912—before the first passenger train reached the town. Significantly, no other stops along the L&E line, such as Hazard, Jackson, or Lexington, ever reported a need for passengers to board the train in such a unique or specialized manner. Furthermore, all contemporary locomotives and passenger cars were equipped with standard steps. A more plausible theory suggests the name was derived from the Greek word neon, meaning "new," reflecting its status as a newly developed town.

=== Development of Fleming ===
Fleming was established in 1913 as a "model city" by the Mineral Fuel Company (later part of the Elkhorn Coal Corporation). Named for company president George W. Fleming, the town was built to house thousands of workers for the nearby mines. By late 1913, Fleming was a booming industrial center with a population of approximately 2,500 people.

=== Consolidation and modern era ===
For decades, Neon and Fleming operated as separate municipalities separated only by the L&N Railroad tracks. In May 1977, residents of both towns voted to merge their governments to qualify for increased federal revenue sharing and program benefits. James Howard Seals was elected the first mayor of the unified City of Fleming-Neon in November 1977.

== Geography ==
Fleming-Neon is located in eastern Letcher County at 37°11′40″N 82°42′21″W (37.194421, -82.705937). It is bordered to the east by the unincorporated community of McRoberts. Whitesburg, the county seat, is 12 miles (19 km) to the southwest.

According to the United States Census Bureau, the city of Fleming-Neon has a total area of 1.6 square miles (4.2 km^{2}), of which 0.53 acres (2,127 m^{2}), or 0.05%, are water. The city is in the valleys of the Wrights Fork and Yonts Fork, part of the upper watershed of the North Fork of the Kentucky River.

== Demographics ==
As of the census of 2000, there were 840 people, 351 households, and 244 families residing in the city. The population density was 509.0 inhabitants per square mile (196.5/km^{2}). There were 403 housing units at an average density of 244.2 per square mile (94.3/km^{2}). The racial makeup of the city was 96.55% White, 2.86% African American, and 0.60% from two or more races. Hispanic or Latino of any race were 0.60% of the population.

There were 351 households, out of which 27.9% had children under the age of 18 living with them, 49.9% were married couples living together, 16.0% had a female householder with no husband present, and 30.2% were non-families. 26.5% of all households were made up of individuals, and 11.7% had someone living alone who was 65 years of age or older. The average household size was 2.39 and the average family size was 2.88.

Historical population
Census	Pop.	Note	%±
1980	1,195		—
1990	759		−36.5%
2000	840		10.7%
2010	770		−8.3%
2020	548		−28.8%
U.S. Decennial Census

In the city, the population was spread out, with 23.5% under the age of 18, 6.9% from 18 to 24, 25.5% from 25 to 44, 26.1% from 45 to 64, and 18.1% who were 65 years of age or older. The median age was 41 years. For every 100 females, there were 97.6 males. For every 100 females age 18 and over, there were 88.6 males.

The median income for a household in the city was $18,421, and the median income for a family was $20,795. Males had a median income of $25,625 versus $23,750 for females. The per capita income for the city was $9,029. About 33.3% of families and 39.4% of the population were below the poverty line, including 55.8% of those under age 18 and 16.8% of those age 65 or over.

== Education ==
Fleming-Neon High School served as the high school for the area for about 80 years. It was built in 1925 and opened in 1926. It was originally named Fleming High School, until the name changed to Fleming-Neon High School in 1949. The school's mascot was a pirate, and the school colors were purple and gold. The original building was destroyed by fire on the night of February 11, 1958. Classes were held in the evenings in the Fleming-Neon Elementary School building until a new building was constructed in the same location as the old building. Classes resumed on the hill until June 6, 2005. The graduating class of 2005 was the last for Fleming-Neon High School due to consolidation with two other county schools, Whitesburg High School and Letcher High School, to form Letcher County Central High School.

== Notable people ==
- Martha Carson (March 19, 1921 – December 16, 2004), country and gospel singer
- Jean Chapel (March 6, 1925 – August 12, 1995), singer-songwriter
- Johnny Cox, Chicago Zephyrs professional basketball player
- Hoover Dawahare (November 2, 1928 – March 16, 2004), businessman and politician
- Srur Frank Dawahare, Syrian immigrant, established the original Dawahare's Department Store, grew into a significant regional chain
- James P. Lewis, former county judge, superintendent of schools, and Kentucky Secretary of State, founding member of the Letcher County Coal and Improvement Company
- Clayton Stapleton (1921–2014), former Fleming High student-athlete, head football coach and athletic director at Iowa State and Florida State, Iowa State Athletics Hall of Fame
