= List of lakes of Kentucky =

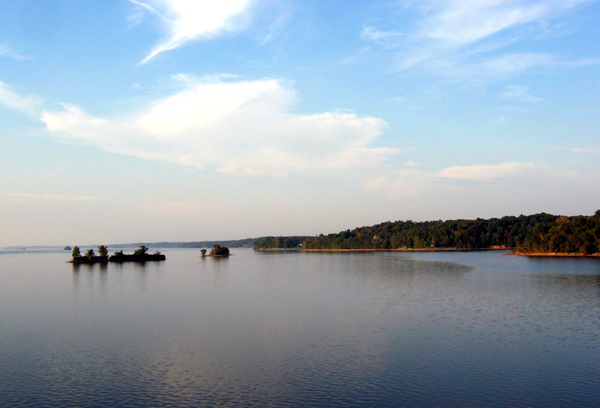
Kentucky Lake

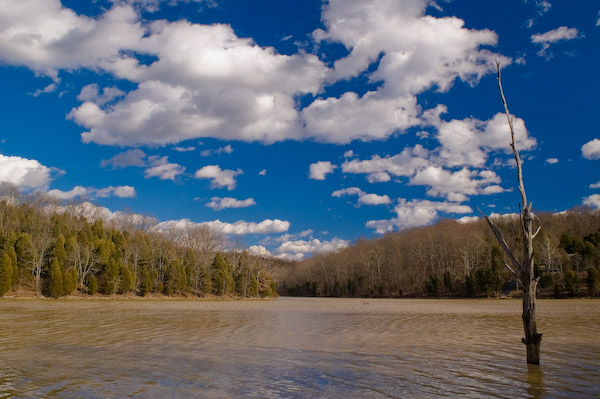
Kincaid Lake

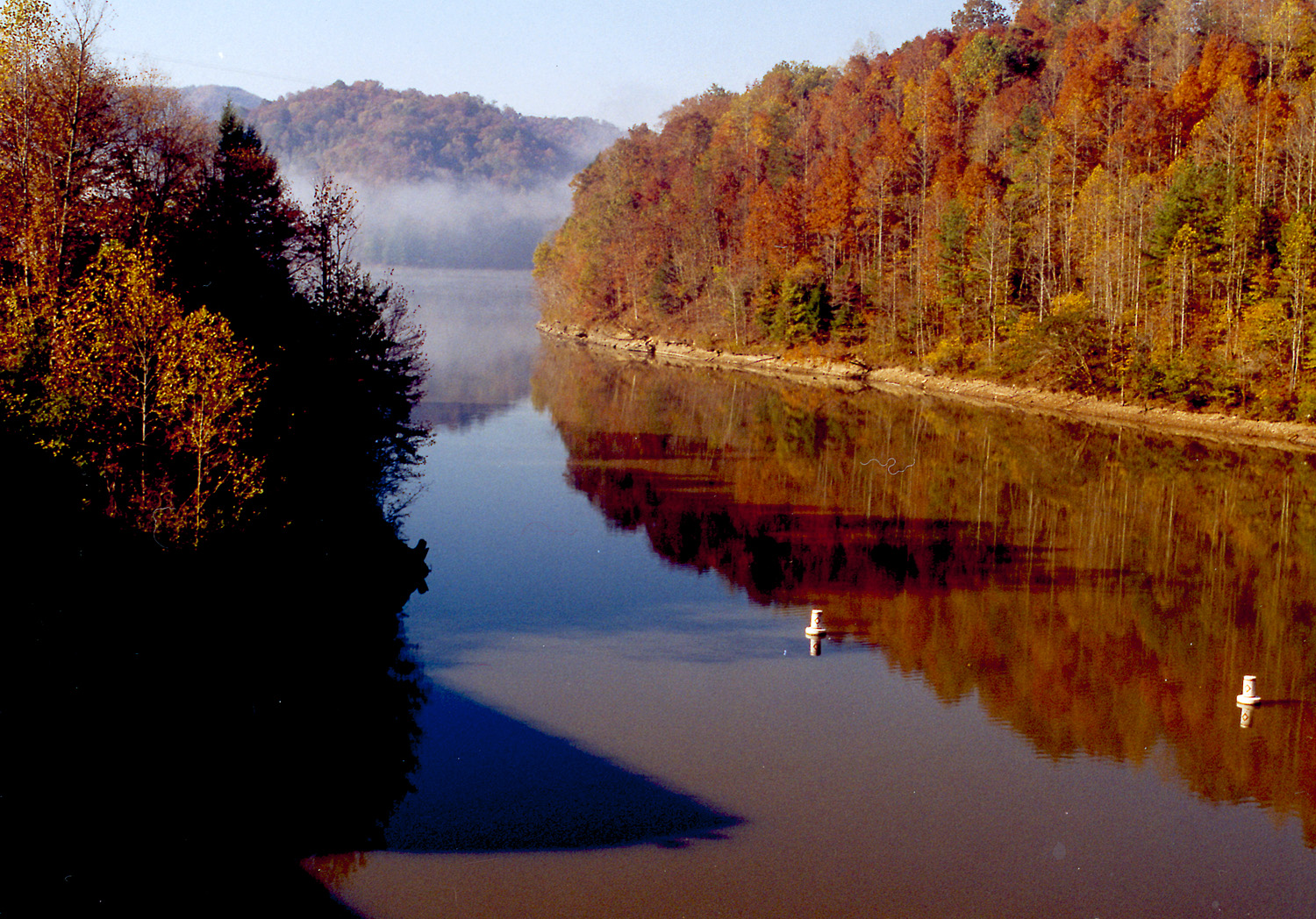
Martins Fork Lake

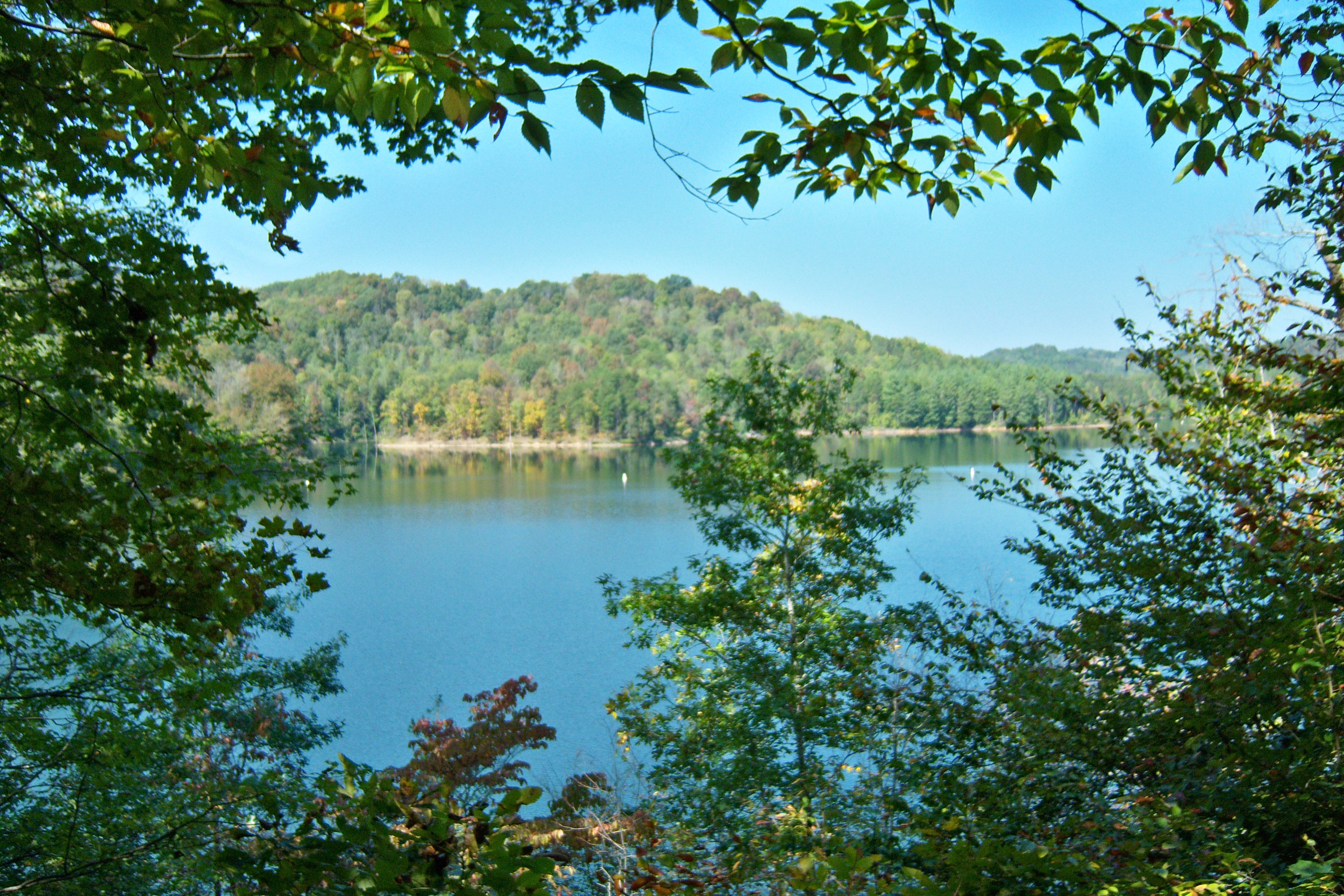
Paintsville Lake

Shanty Hollow Lake

The following is a list of lakes and reservoirs in the state of Kentucky in the United States. Swimming, fishing, and/or boating are permitted in some of these lakes, but not all.

- Lake Barkley (extends into Tennessee)
- Barren River Lake
- Beaver Lake
- Boltz Lake
- Buckhorn Lake
- Bullock Pen Lake
- Lake Beshear
- Cannon Creek Lake
- Lake Carnico
- Carr Creek Lake (formerly Carr Fork Lake)
- Cave Run Lake
- Cedar Creek Lake
- Cranks Creek Lake
- Lake Cumberland
- Dale Hollow Lake (extends into Tennessee)
- Dewey Lake
- Doe Run Lake
- Elk Lake
- Elmer Davis Lake
- Fishtrap Lake
- Grayson Lake
- Green River Lake
- Greenbo Lake
- Guist Creek Lake
- Herrington Lake
- Kentucky Lake (extends into Tennessee).
- Kincaid Lake
- Laurel River Lake
- Lake Linville
- Lake Malone
- Martins Fork Lake
- Nolin River Lake
- Lake Number 9
- Paintsville Lake
- Pan Bowl Lake
- Rough River Lake
- Shanty Hollow Lake
- Shelby Lake
- Swan Lake
- Taylorsville Lake
- Wilgreen Lake
- Williamstown Lake
- Willisburg Lake
- Wood Creek Lake
- Yatesville Lake
