= Interstate 75 in Kentucky =

Interstate Highway in Kentucky, United States

Interstate 75
- I-75 highlighted in red

Route information
- Maintained by KYTC
- Length: 191.78 mi (308.64 km)
- Existed: 1960s–present
- NHS: Entire route

Major junctions
- South end: I-75 at Tennessee state line near Williamsburg
- US 25 / US 421 in Richmond; US 60 in Lexington; I-64 in Lexington; US 27 / US 68 in Lexington; US 460 in Georgetown; US 62 in Georgetown; I-71 in Walton; US 42 / US 127 in Florence; I-275 in Erlanger
- North end: I-71 / I-75 at Ohio state line in Covington

Location
- Country: United States
- State: Kentucky
- Counties: Whitley, Laurel, Rockcastle, Madison, Fayette, Scott, Grant, Boone, Kenton

Highway system
- Interstate Highway System; Main; Auxiliary; Suffixed; Business; Future; Kentucky State Highway System; Interstate; US; State; Parkways
← KY 74	→ KY 76

Interstate 75 (I-75) is a part of the Interstate Highway System that runs from the Hialeah–Miami Lakes line to the Canada–United States border at Sault Ste. Marie, Michigan. In the U.S. state of Kentucky, I-75 runs through the eastern half of the state, from the Tennessee state line near the city of Williamsburg to the Ohio state line near Covington. The Interstate serves the state's second-most populous city, Lexington. Outside of it, the route is mostly rural or suburban in nature, mainly providing access to other cities via state and U.S. Highways. The major landscapes traversed by I-75 include the rolling hills and mountains of the Cumberland Plateau, the flat Bluegrass region, the urban core of Lexington, and the highly urbanized suburbs of Northern Kentucky; it also very briefly crosses through the Eastern Kentucky Coalfield at its southernmost stretch and passes near the Daniel Boone National Forest in London.

Of the six states which I-75 passes through, the segment in Kentucky is the second-shortest, at 191.78 miles (308.64 km) long. I-75 parallels the older U.S. Route 25 (US 25) and U.S. Route 25E (US 25E) corridors for its entire length in Kentucky. The Interstate was part of the Federal-Aid Highway Act of 1956, with a section of it from the Ohio River at Covington to an unknown location north of Richmond being the first segment of the Interstate Highway, opened in 1957. Unfinished portions of the highway were eventually completed in increments, with the very last section being opened in 1969. Due to the rapid growth and high traffic volume in the Lexington metropolitan area and Northern Kentucky, many widening projects and renovations have been undertaken on I-75 since then. The Interstate has one auxiliary route, I-275, a beltway encircling Cincinnati.

== Route description ==
As with all other Interstate, US, and state highways in Kentucky, I-75 is maintained by the Kentucky Transportation Cabinet for its entire length. Annual average daily traffic counts in 2022 ranged from a peak of 196,929 vehicles per day concurrent with I-71 at the I-275 interchange in Erlanger to a low of 33,001 vehicles per day from Williamsburg to the Tennessee state line. The route is designated as the Tuskegee Airmen Memorial Trail for its entire length.

=== Cumberland Plateau, Pottsville Escarpment, and Lexington suburbs ===
I-75 enters Whitley County, Kentucky from Tennessee near the city of Williamsburg. Skirting the foothills of the Cumberland Plateau, the Interstate briefly parallels Clear Fork and crosses it before reaching the welcome center. Curving left, I-75 crosses Clear Fork again near Saxton and begins paralleling US 25W. 8 miles (13 km) later, I-75 reaches its first interchange in the state with KY 92 for downtown Williamsburg. I-75 then meanders through more mountainous terrain and passes by a water plant before straightening out and crossing the Cumberland River. The Interstate then directly intersects with US 25W containing a roundabout at the interchange. It continues on for 10 miles (16 km) and reaches the city of Corbin where it once again meets US 25W (Cumberland Falls Highway) providing access to the Corbin campus of Eastern Kentucky University. I-75 bypasses Corbin to the west and heads slightly to the east through forests to cross the Laurel River, a branch of the Laurel River Lake, and enters Laurel County. From here, it reaches an interchange for access to US 25 for the first time and US 25E near Corbin. North of the interchange, the Interstate crosses the Laurel River once more. Beyond this, I-75 continues for about 1 mile (1.6 km) or so before crossing over the Little Laurel River, a tributary of the Laurel River and reaching a truck weigh station. Another 4 miles (6.4 km) pass by before I-75 reaches London and intersects with KY 192. From here, I-75 avoids London to the west and briefly after that, intersects KY 80 (which carries a part of the Hal Rogers Parkway). Just after this interchange, I-75 closely parallels US 25 from East Bernstadt. The Interstate makes a sharp turn to the west and nears the Daniel Boone National Forest. Near the Wood Creek Lake reservoir, I-75 approaches Livingston and provides indirect access to US 25 via KY 909.

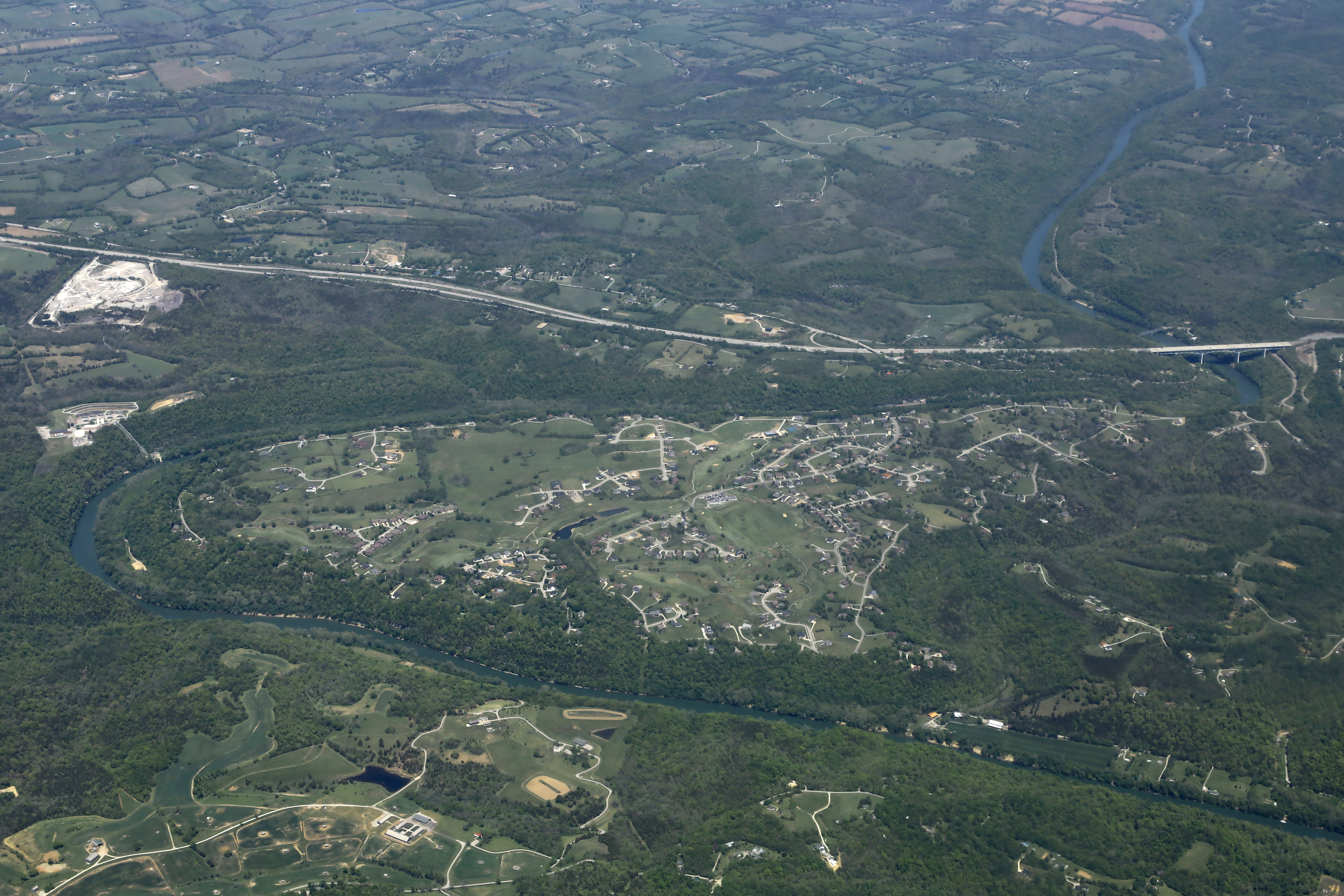
Aerial photo of I-75/US 25/US 421 crossing over the Kentucky River

Continuing northwest, I-75 crosses the Rockcastle River, entering Rockcastle County. The Interstate turns a bit north and parallels a small stream for 9 miles (14 km) before reaching a direct interchange with US 25. I-75 then turns northwest again and meets US 25 a second time. Bypassing Mount Vernon to the north, I-75 passes along the shoreline of Lake Linville and continues to parallel US 25. Approximately 10 miles (16 km) after this, the Interstate enters the rocky Pottsville Escarpment to reach Madison County and from here, descends into the flat Bluegrass region. I-75 has an interchange with KY 21 (Paint Lick Road) near the city of Berea. After avoiding Berea to the west, I-75 passes through rural fields before milepost 83, where it reaches the city of Richmond and has an exit for KY 2872 (Duncannon Lane) and passes right near a Buc-ee's truck stop. As it approaches the downtown area of Richmond, I-75 avoids it and passes off the flagship campus of Eastern Kentucky University. The route then hits suburban development and intersects with US 25/US 421 (Robert R. Martin Bypass). Here, I-75 curves northwest and then back north as it parallels US 25/US 421. At milepost 97, it meets US 25/US 421 (Lexington Road) again, but this time starts a brief concurrency with the U.S. Highways. The three routes turn northwest to cross the Kentucky River on the Clays Ferry Bridge and enter Fayette County. I-75 then separates from both U.S. Highways and turns slightly northwest to enter Lexington.

=== Lexington to Ohio ===
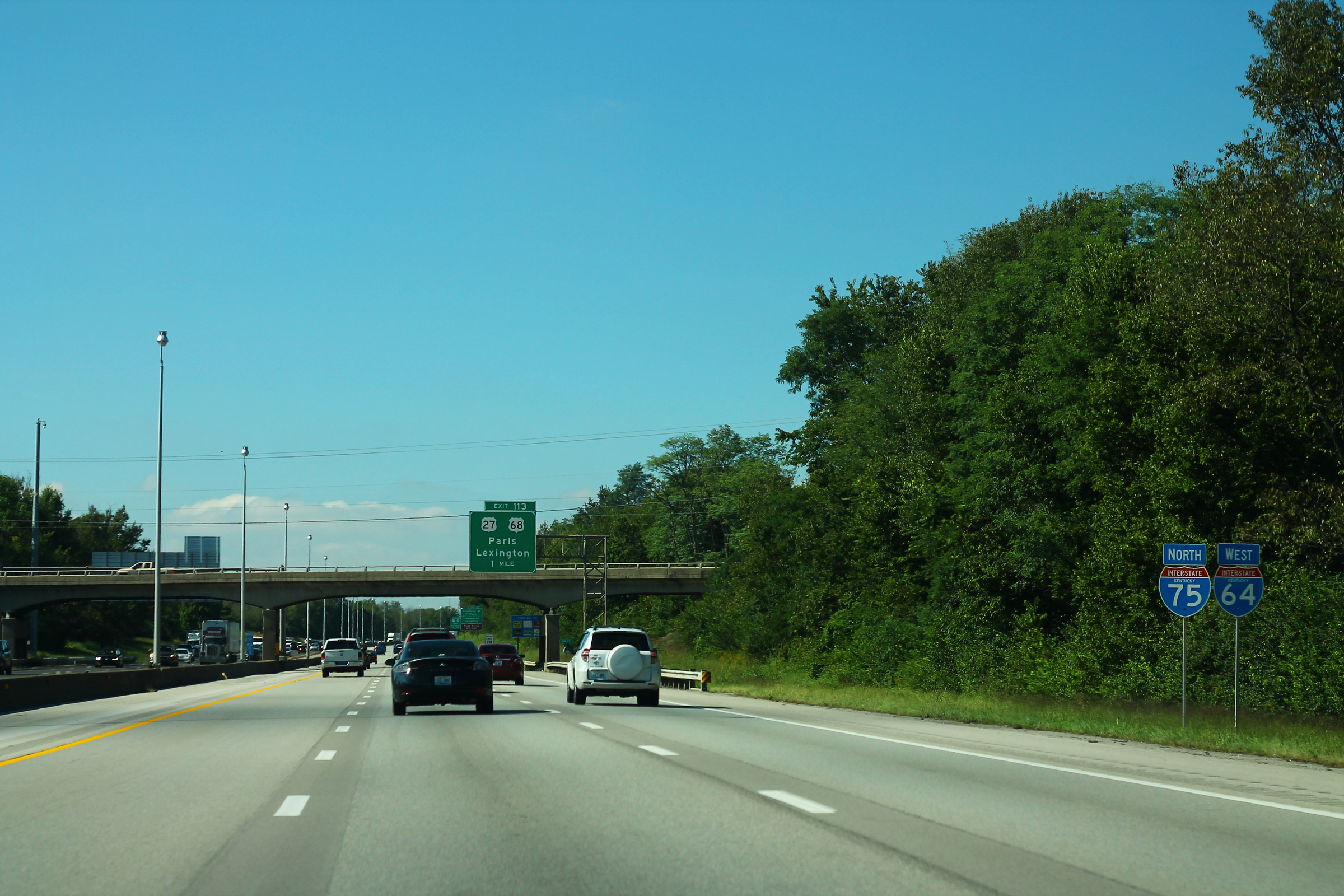
I-75 northbound/I-64 westbound near US 27/US 68 in Lexington

As it approaches Lexington, I-75 gradually begins entering the commercial developments of the city. After passing the neighborhood of Autumn Ridge, its first interchange in downtown is with Man o' War Boulevard. It then stays in a northwest direction as it also passes near a hospital part of Baptist Health. The Interstate turns to the north and has an interchange with US 60 (Winchester Road), which leads to downtown. I-75 curves northwest again and has an interchange with I-64, which merges with I-75, beginning a concurrency and retaining I-75's exit numbers. The highways jog northwest through more of the city's commercial developments before reaching a parclo interchange with US 27/US 68 (North Broadway). I-64/I-75 stays northwest passing some of Lexington's neighborhoods such as Radcliffe, Joyland, and Winburn before meeting KY 922 (Newtown Pike) for the Bluegrass Parkway and Blue Grass Airport. From here, the routes head almost entirely west before I-64 splits from I-75 to head for Frankfort and Louisville while I-75 continues north through rural terrain. Its next interchange roughly one mile (1.6 km) after that is with KY 1973 (Iron Works Pike), providing indirect access to US 25, before entering Scott County a short distance later and crossing a stream known as Cane Run.

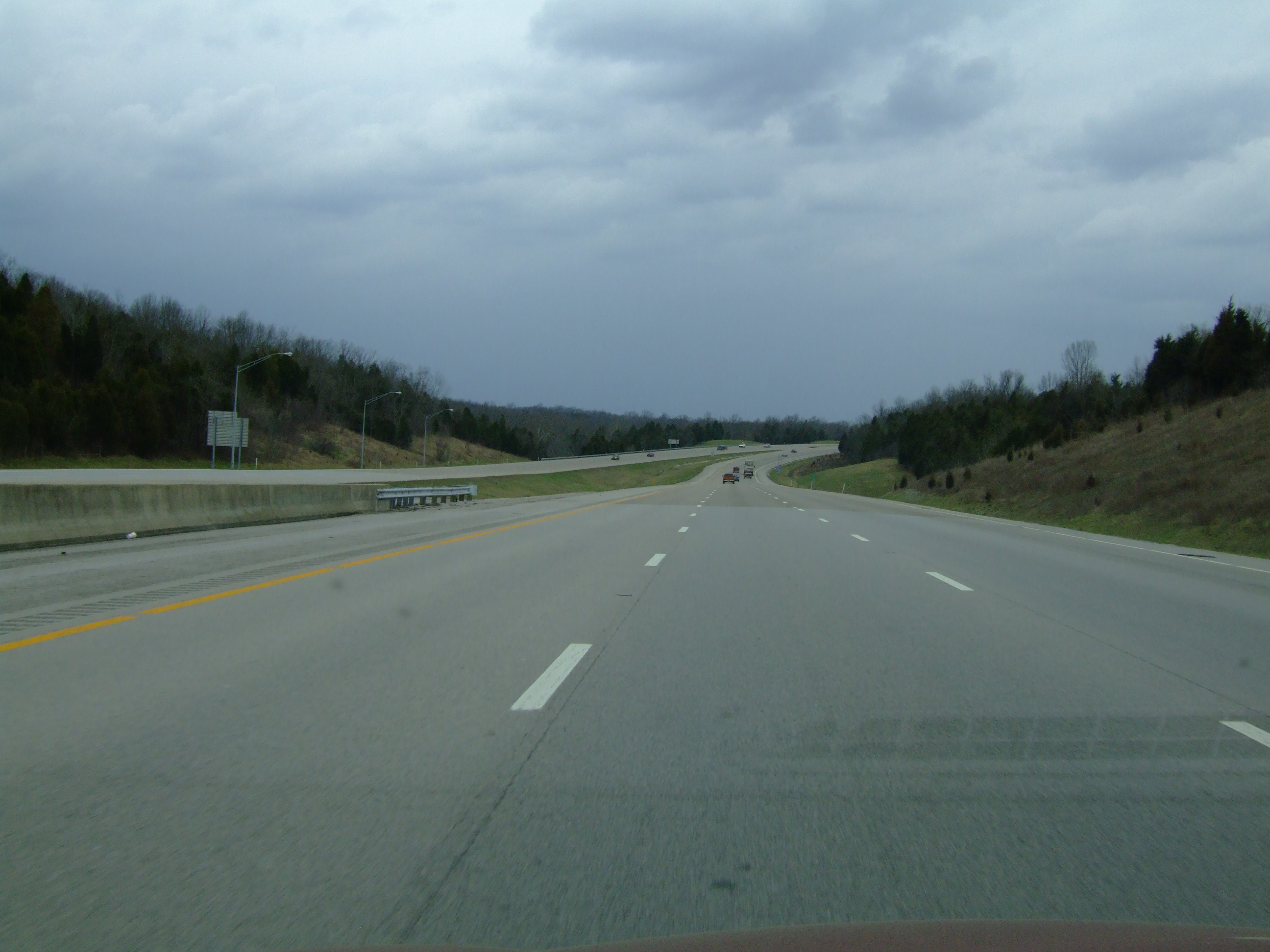
I-75 north of Lexington

Exiting the Lexington urban area and meandering its way through farmland, I-75 makes a turn to the northeast, then the northwest as it crosses the north branch of the Elkhorn Creek approaching Georgetown. Its first interchange there is with US 460 (Paris Pike) and then it immediately intersects with US 62 (Cherry Blossom Way). After its interchange with Lexus Way (exit 127), the Interstate reaches a rest area and interchanges with KY 620 (Cherry Blossom Way) a short distance later. The northbound lanes then reach a truck weigh station as I-75 begins paralleling US 25 again. I-75 passes through lush greenery and farmland, then crosses a branch of the Eagle Creek to reach an interchange with KY 32 near Sadieville. As I-75 bypasses Sadieville to the west, it crosses the main Eagle Creek and continues through rural land, entering Grant County and coming very close to the border with Owen County as well. At milepost 144, it intersects KY 330 and passes along the shoreline of a nearby lake and after eight miles (13 km), has an interchange with KY 36 for Owenton and Williamstown. The Interstate passes by more lush farmland for another 5 miles (8.0 km) to Dry Ridge, where it meets KY 22/KY 467 (Broadway Street), which both serve the downtown area. I-75 heads in a relatively straight direction north of the interchange, and passes the side of Boltz Lake for another seven miles (11 km) to Crittenden, where an interchange with KY 491 (Violet Road) appears. A short distance from here, the southbound lanes have a truck weigh station while I-75 turns back to the northwest. It briefly enters Kenton County then crosses into Boone County in quick succession.

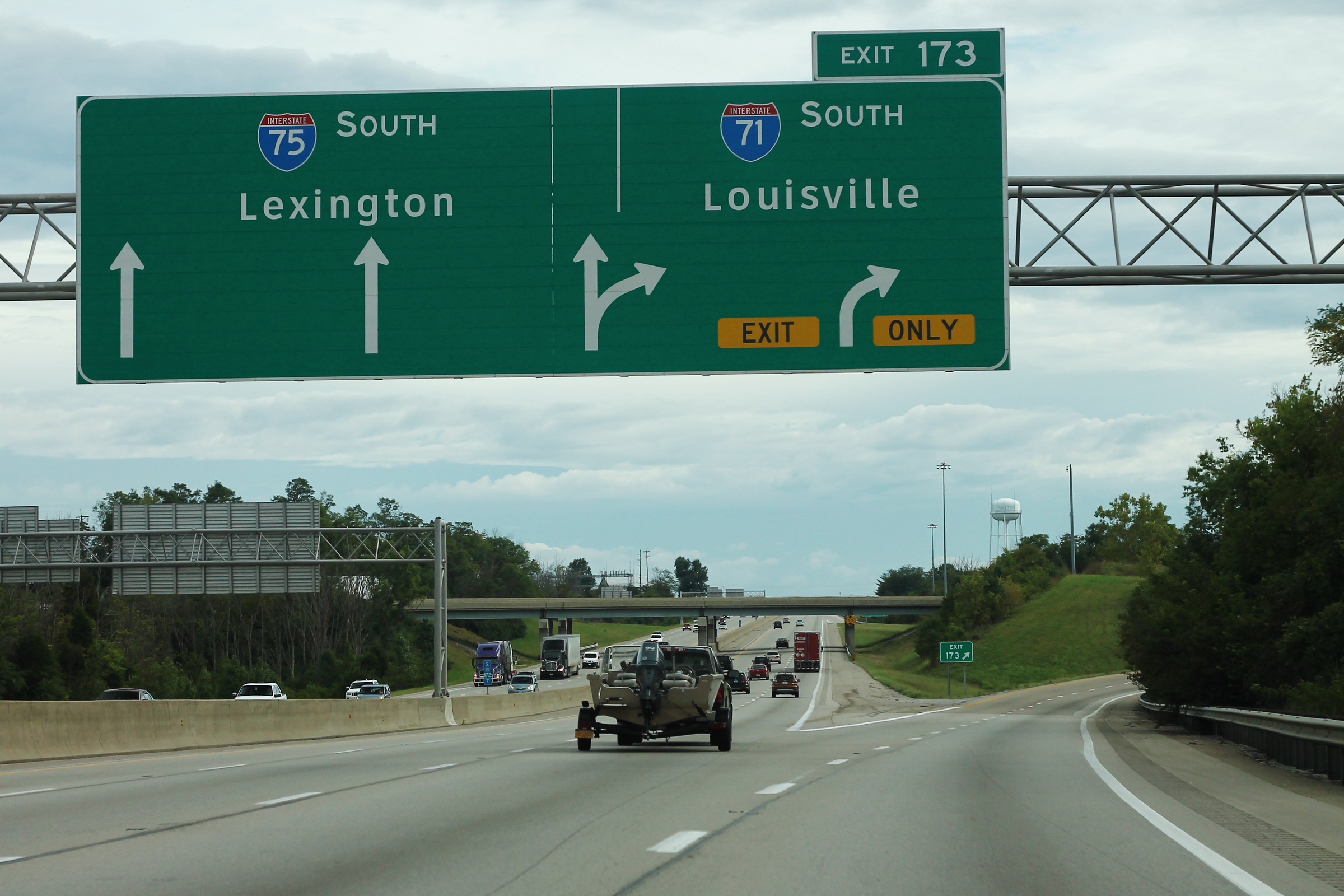
I-75 southbound at its junction with I-71

In Walton, I-75 interchanges with KY 16 for the city's district. Two miles (3.2 km) after this, it reaches the interchange with I-71, which heads southbound for Louisville. I-71 joins I-75 in a concurrency, with both routes heading due north. Their first junction together is a diverging diamond interchange with KY 338 (Richwood Drive) for Richwood and Union. As I-71/I-75 passes the interchange, it enters Northern Kentucky and the Cincinnati metropolitan area. From here, it passes Florence and interchanges with KY 536 (Mount Zion Road) and rolls by the campus of Gateway Community and Technical College. The route continues through more suburban development and at milepost 180, reaches a parclo interchange with US 42/US 127 for downtown Florence. As it bypasses the city to the west, I-71/I-75 has a southbound interchange for Mall Road, which connects to Florence Mall. Passing near the mall and the Florence Y'all Water Tower, I-71/I-75 makes a turn to the northeast and has an interchange with KY 18 (Burlington Pike). The highway then veers even more northeast for approximately a mile while entering Kenton County again in the process. It has a parclo interchange with KY 236 (Commonwealth Avenue) and reaches a stack interchange with the long I-275 beltway. From here, I-71/I-75 continues for some distance, has a parclo with KY 371 (Buttermilk Pike), and then alternates between northeast and east directions for the next several miles. In the meantime, it bypasses both Fort Mitchell and Fort Wright to the north and has an interchange with US 25/US 42/US 127 upon entering Covington, then parallels them. I-71/I-75 turns back north and descends a steep incline, known as "Cut-in-the-Hill" for an interchange with 12th Street and 5th Street, both heading for the downtown area. After passing the many neighborhoods of Covington, I-71/I-75 crosses the Ohio River via the lower level of the Brent Spence Bridge (southbound traffic uses the upper level) into Hamilton County, Ohio and the city of Cincinnati.

== History ==
=== Initial design and construction ===
As part of the Federal-Aid Highway Act of 1956, I-75 was one of the original Interstate Highways in Kentucky when the KYTC was allotted 641 miles (1,032 km) of mileage for a program, including undetermined mileage through the westernmost portion of Kentucky as well as an authorized route between Cairo, Illinois and Nashville, Tennessee to build in the state. As of November 24, 1957, I-75 was the longest single Interstate stretch in the program which costed a total of $350,277,000. While the program would take approximately 13 to 16 years, the length of I-75 was mostly complete to standards, running from the Ohio River at Covington to an unknown point north of Richmond in Madison County. This resulted in a 70-mile (110 km) gap left to be filled in, as the other segment of I-75 in Laurel County, just north of Corbin, would continue on to the Tennessee state line, ultimately down south to Knoxville. On December 15, 1961, Bert Combs, Wilson W. Wyatt, and Henry Ward selected I-75 as one of three stretches to be in a ribbon-cutting ceremony, along with the KY 55 and US 127 interchanges along I-64. The group of three headed to Florence and performed ribbon-cutting exercises, resulting in this portion of I-75 becoming the first one to be opened formally to the public.

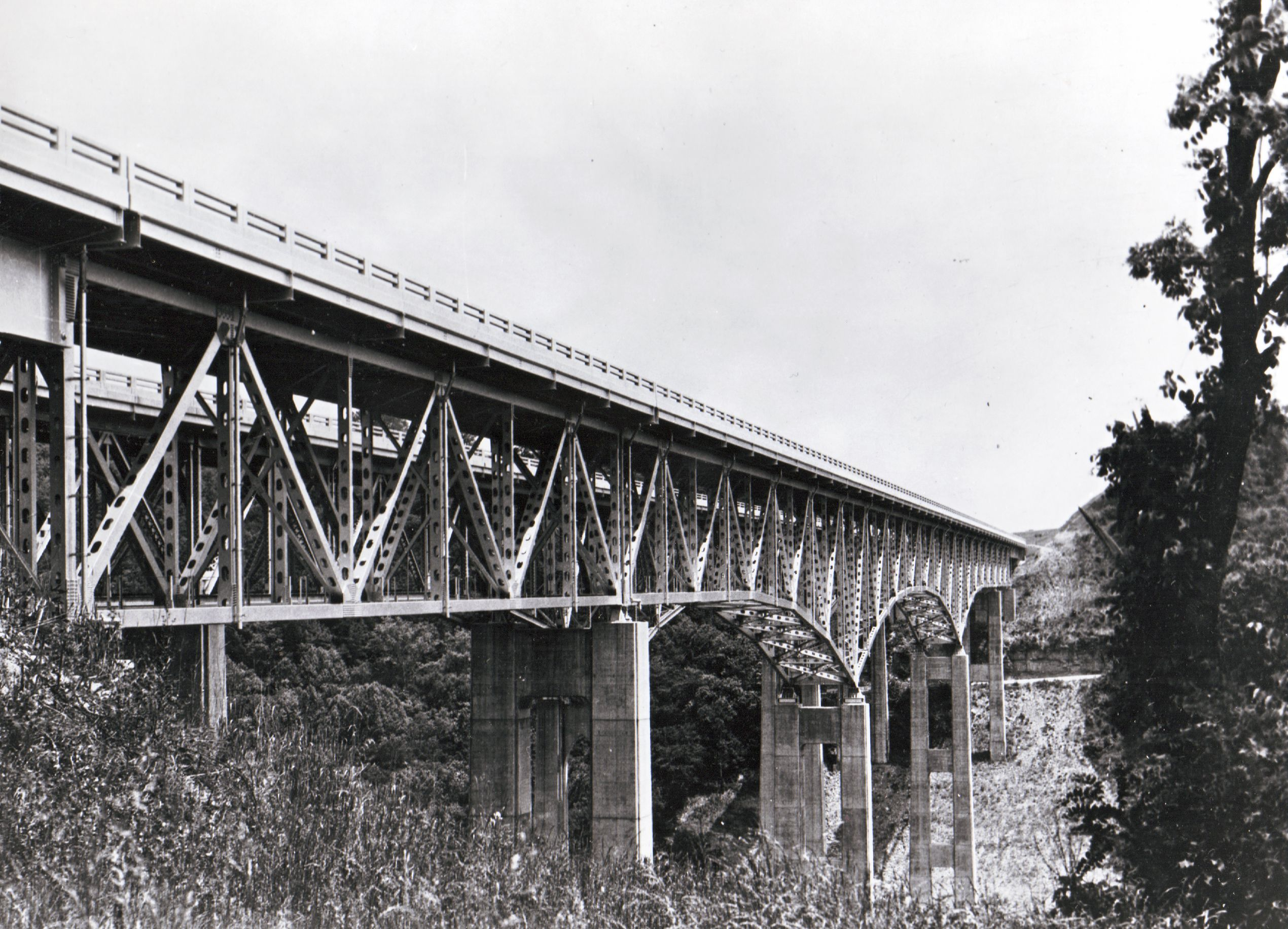
I-75 crossing the Clays Ferry Bridge in 1967

On December 19, several days later, the southernmost portion of the 21.5-mile (34.6 km) segment of I-75 at the KY 22 interchange in Dry Ridge was officially dedicated to the public as well. The ribbon-cutting ceremony was held at 3 pm on the north end of the interchange with Combs also participating. This part was open, and the segment from Florence to Covington was expected to be open around spring of 1962 once the interchange with Fifth Street was also completed. During the same time, the stretch of I-64 from Frankfort to Shelbyville was also dedicated, allowing drivers to use I-75 to get from Dry Ridge to Louisville along a mostly four-lane road. Around the week of August 1962, another section of the Interstate was opened from the same interchange with KY 22 at Dry Ridge to KY 36 south of Williamstown, a stretch of approximately 29.4 miles (47.3 km) while paralleling US 25. Although US 25 goes through several communities, the government announced that I-75 would bypass these places to the west, avoiding their traffic lights and low speed limits and saving drivers several minutes of time. As this segment was opened, it almost connected with the already complete segment in Florence. Ward indicated however, that it was "not likely" the highway would be opened by September 1 as signs had not been installed and a formal inspection had to be done before the opening of the full segment. September 14 saw the dedication of 11 miles (18 km) of the Interstate from Florence to Fifth Street in Covington, allowing drivers to travel approximately 38 miles (61 km) from Covington to Williamstown, with paving on a 12-mile (19 km) section in Scott County north of Georgetown still in progress. By December 20, the Kentucky State Police announced that the stretch of I-75 between Richmond and the Clays Ferry Bridge was open to traffic.

By January 16, 1963, over $18 million worth of roads were dedicated by the government, being the first dedications in 1963 after a full year of construction. The dedication for I-75 at the US 25 interchange at Richmond was opened by 2 pm with an approximate cost of $7.37 million. On January 17, Combs said at a ribbon-cutting tour that if construction continued at a constant rate of speed, then the Interstate could be fully completed by 1972. Ward also said that I-75 from Cincinnati to Richmond could be ready for travel around 1964. I-75 between Clays Ferry and Richmond had already been built, and the bypass at Frankfort helped shorten the driving time between Lexington and Louisville anywhere from 15 to 25 minutes. The state as a whole decided that the I-75 corridor would cut between Berea, Richmond, Mount Vernon, and Corbin on its way to Tennessee, paralleling that of US 25. The decision would be pending "for a few weeks", as the state was required to get approval from the federal government before proceeding ahead even if the suggestion was approved. On October 25, another 19-mile (31 km) stretch of the Interstate was opened, but signs and traffic islands had not been erected yet and according to a State Highway Department official, a strip would have its opening later. With the highway almost complete, the last gap in the Interstate to Covington would be opened in approximately 30 days.

On November 24, 1964, the state opened up more than $16 million worth of Interstate Highways in Fayette County, which involved "barrier breaking" to open up I-75 in the area. The "barrier breaking" opened up a 7.75-mile (12.47 km) section of road where I-75 and I-64 covered a circle to the north and east of Lexington while an additional 5 miles (8.0 km) of I-75 was also opened in the area. This allowed travelers to drive a distance of 100 miles (160 km) from Richmond to Cincinnati. By 1966, out of its 191.6-mile (308.4 km) length, approximately 114 miles (183 km) of the Interstate were fully complete, while 35 miles (56 km) were still under construction. The sections open included from the Tennessee state line to near Williamsburg, and from Richmond to Covington. The stretch from Corbin to near Roundstone in Rockcastle County was still undergoing construction, and right-of-way acquisition as well as engineering were on process in parts of Rockcastle, Laurel, and Whitley counties. By December 30, 1967, a three-mile (4.8 km) portion at Mount Vernon was opened and connected to US 25 at both ends, providing a bypass around the city and relieving a bottleneck for many travelers. By May 16, 1969, I-75 through Corbin was finished and opened for traffic, officially completing the Interstate as a whole.

=== Later history ===
==== Projects ====
I-75 has undergone multiple projects and alignments since its establishment. The Clays Ferry Bridge which carries I-75 traffic across the Kentucky River was fully opened to traffic on December 2, 1963, at a cost of $2,450,000. The bridge, which was designed for southbound travelers, faces parallel with the older bridge made of riveted truss. It was made of welded truss and resulted in Kentucky having the highest bridges east of the Mississippi River, with a length of 250 feet (76 m) across the body of the river. The bridge was designed with 11,397 cubic yards of concrete, 5,202,700 pounds of concrete, and 1,646,127 pounds of steel reinforcement. The Brent Spence Bridge at Covington was dedicated a day later, at a cost of approximately $10 million and a double-decker bridge. It was the first Ohio River bridge to be constructed in 72 years, allowing traffic to run uninterrupted from Georgetown to just south of Dayton, Ohio, at a distance of about 115 miles (185 km).

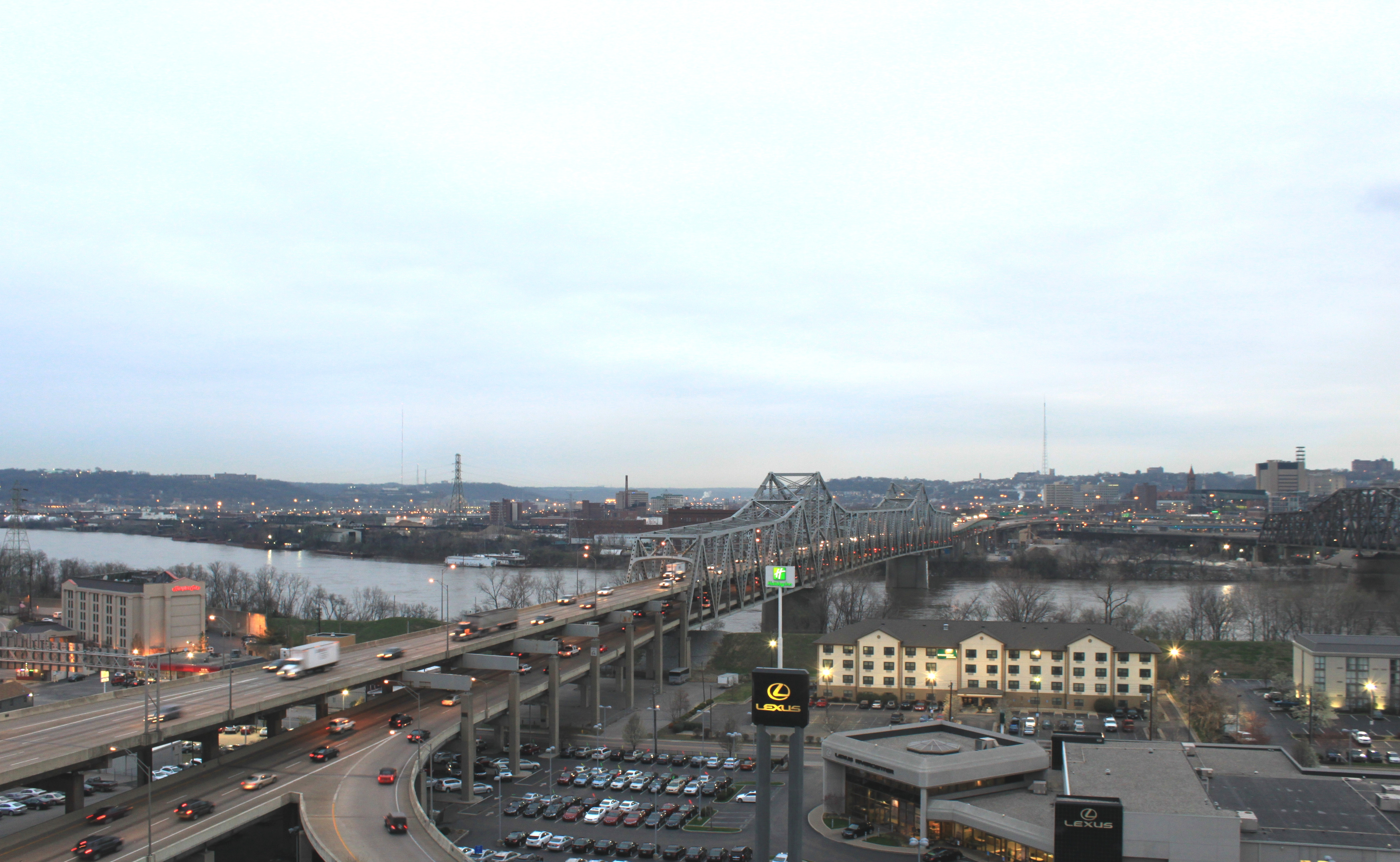
The Brent Spence Bridge from Covington in 2011

The interchange of I-71/I-75 and I-275 has seen a push to be renovated. In an August 2019 survey from the 5th to the 19th, approximately 2,278 people provided a response to the survey, with 79% of respondents using the interchange several times a week or even several times a day, and 63% of respondents using the interchange for work-related travel. Many respondents also frequently cited several issues at the interchange; there was often dangerous merging from I-275 to the Erlanger interchange, slow traffic along I-275 in both sides of I-71/I-75, and slowdowns on I-71/I-75 themselves on the north and south sides of the interchange. The peak travel time was shown to be between 5-7 pm. As the problem had been persisting for several years, the process to renovate the interchange was divided into five phases: planning, preliminary engineering and environmental evaluation, design, right of way and utility coordination, and construction. Currently, the project has completed the survey and scoping study, while it is in the second phase: preliminary engineering and environmental analysis.

Some widening projects have also been undertaken along the Interstate to help reduce traffic and improve flow. Around November 1990, the state received $21 million in funds to widen a 7.7-mile (12.4 km) section of I-75 in Scott County to three lanes from a weigh station to the Eagle Creek bridges. Although the total project would cost about $23.5 million total, the state would contribute $2.3 million not in federal grant money. In northern and southern Laurel County, the state helped widen the roadway of the Interstate from four to six lanes. The northern portion of the project, located at milepost 40.7 to 48, involves the segment running from south of KY 909 to London, a distance of about 7.29 miles (11.73 km). It also involved adding two new bridges along US 25 over I-75 and providing truck climbing lanes at the steep portion of the roadway near the Wood Creek Lake reservoir to reduce accidents caused by trucks. The southern portion, located at mileposts 28.9 to 33.2, was projected to be widened from four to six lanes too, and also reconstruct the bridges over the Little Laurel River, both of which I-75 crosses. The southern portion of the project was completed on November 30, 2021, while the northern portion was completed on July 16, 2022. Currently, the section of I-64/I-75 in Lexington is also undergoing widening; this segment was a length of 2.3 miles (3.7 km), extending from milepost 112.9 to 115.2 and at a cost of $48 million. The project is estimated to widen the roadway to eight lanes to improve traffic flow as the interchanges in Lexington experience heavy congestion. The project was let to construction on August 18, 2022, awarded on August 23, and construction is currently ongoing as of September.

==== Incidents ====
===== Cut-in-the-Hill =====
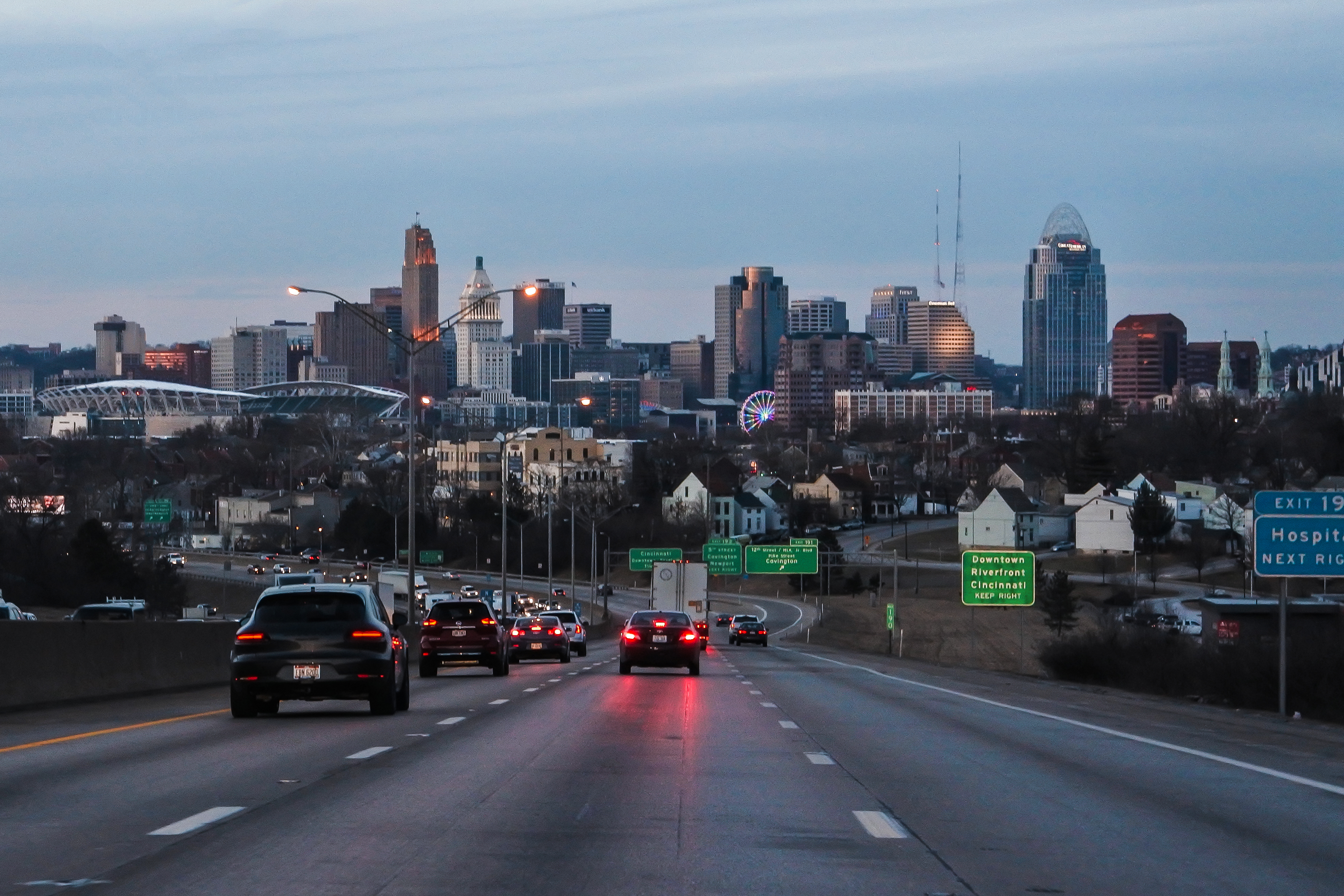
I-71/I-75 descending into Cincinnati from Covington along the "Cut-in-the-Hill"

The stretch through Covington originally included hills and curves steeper than those recommended for Interstate Highway standards. As a result, the northbound descent into Cincinnati, known as Cut-in-the-Hill, was nicknamed "Death Hill". It is a steep descent into the valley of the Ohio River between Kyles Lane and the Brent Spence Bridge leading into Downtown Cincinnati. The hill is known for its high number of automobile accidents. In 2006, the Cut-in-the-Hill averaged over seven times more accidents when compared to similar roadways in Kentucky. At the Cut-in-the-Hill, the northbound road takes a sharp left turn into a steep grade down to the Ohio River—about 370 feet (110 m) in four miles (6.4 km). Accidents are usually attributed to a combination of speeding, curvy lanes, poor weather, longer stopping times for trucks traveling downhill, and traffic congestion. The area earned the sobriquet "Death Hill" shortly after I-75 opened in 1962. By 1968, a total of 23 people died in crashes on the hill, so a concrete wall was installed to separate northbound and southbound traffic. The wall helped reduce fatal crashes, but accidents continued, and in 1977, the hill averaged 583 automobile accidents per year.

In 1986, a tractor-trailer lost control, leading to an accident that caused a Northern Kentucky University student to burn to death in his car. As a result, Governor Martha Layne Collins banned most northbound tractor-trailer traffic from the hill. From 1989 until 1994, $50 million (equivalent to $95.7 million in 2024) in reconstruction was spent to straighten the hill's S-curve and add a fourth lane for southbound traffic, and in 1995, the truck ban was lifted. Also as part of the reconstruction, ramps were added at Pike Street to give complete access, while an interchange with Jefferson and Euclid avenues was obliterated. In 2006, the hill and the Brent Spence Bridge saw 151 crashes in the northbound direction and 121 crashes in the southbound direction, totaling 272 in all. To help reduce the number of accidents, a flashing "Steep Grade" sign was installed and a Kentucky State Police trooper was assigned to patrol just the Cut-in-the-Hill. Additionally, eight radar speed signs would be installed in 2007 to remind motorists to drive a safer speed. The Cut-in-the-Hill was originally designed to carry up to 80,000 vehicles per day, but, in 2006, it carried 155,000 daily. Kentucky officials are reportedly working to raise more than $2 billion to replace the section of highway, but as of 2012, no construction is planned.

== Exit list ==
County	Location	mi (Note: Milepoint route logs reset at county lines. Lengths are determined by adding subsequent county miles.)	km	Exit	Destinations	Notes
Whitley		0.000	0.000		I-75 south – Knoxville	Continuation into Tennessee
Whitley	Williamsburg	10.548	16.975	11	KY 92 to US 25W – Williamsburg, Pineville	
Whitley	Williamsburg	15.456	24.874	15	US 25W – Williamsburg	
Whitley	Corbin	24.670	39.703	25	US 25W (Cumberland Falls Highway) – Corbin	
Laurel	North Corbin	28.852	46.433	29	To Cumberland Gap Parkway / US 25 / US 25E – Corbin, Barbourville	
Laurel	London	38.187	61.456	38	KY 192 (B. W. Ridge Road) to Hal Rogers Parkway – London	
Laurel	London	40.708	65.513	41	KY 80 (Hal Rogers Parkway) – London, Somerset, Hazard	
Laurel	East Bernstadt	49.132	79.070	49	KY 909 to US 25 (Wilderness Road Heritage Highway) – Livingston	
Rockcastle	Mount Vernon	58.966	94.897	59	US 25 (Wilderness Road Heritage Highway) to US 150 – Mt. Vernon, Livingston	
Rockcastle	Mount Vernon	62.013	99.800	62	US 25 (Richmond Street) to KY 461 – Mt. Vernon, Renfro Valley	
Madison	Berea	75.516	121.531	76	KY 21 (E. Chestnut Street, W. Paint Lick Road) to US 25 – Berea	
Madison	Berea	77.468	124.673	77	KY 595 (Walnut Meadow Pike) to KY 956 – Berea	
Madison	Richmond	82.832	133.305	83	KY 2872 (Duncannon Lane) to US 25 – Richmond	
Madison	Richmond	87.150	140.254	87	KY 876 (Eastern Bypass) – Richmond, Lancaster	
Madison	Richmond	89.833	144.572	90	US 25 / US 421 (Robert R. Martin Bypass) – Richmond, Irvine	Signed as 90B (north) and 90A (south) southbound; northbound exit also connects to businesses on Northgate and Lexington roads (signed as Service Access Road)
Madison	Richmond	94.715	152.429	95	KY 627 (Boonesborough Road) – Boonesborough, Winchester	
Madison	Richmond	97.038	156.168	97	US 25 south / US 421 south (Lexington Road) – Richmond, Clays Ferry	South end of US 25 / US 421 overlap
Kentucky River		97.541– 97.865	156.977– 157.498	Clays Ferry Bridge		
Fayette	Lexington	98.516	158.546	99	US 25 north / US 421 north (Old Richmond Road) – Lexington, Clays Ferry	North end of US 25 / US 421 overlap
Fayette	Lexington	103.890	167.195	104	KY 418 (Athens-Boonesborough Road) – Lexington, Athens, Boonesborough	
Fayette	Lexington	108.247	174.207	108	KY 1425 (Man o' War Boulevard) – Lexington	KY 1425 not signed
Fayette	Lexington	109.677	176.508	110	US 60 (Winchester Road) – Lexington, Winchester	
Fayette	Lexington	110.829	178.362	111	I-64 east – Winchester, Ashland	South end of I-64 overlap; I-64 exit 81
Fayette	Lexington	112.834	181.589	113	US 27 / US 68 (Broadway) – Lexington, Paris	
Fayette	Lexington	115.226	185.438	115	KY 922 (Newtown Pike) to Bluegrass Parkway – Lexington, Blue Grass Airport	
Fayette	Lexington	117.665	189.363	118	I-64 west – Frankfort, Louisville	North end of I-64 overlap; I-64 exit 75
Fayette	Lexington	119.873	192.917	120	KY 1973 (Iron Works Pike) to US 25 – Lexington, Georgetown	
Scott	Georgetown	124.868	200.956	125	US 460 (Paris Pike) – Georgetown, Paris	Northbound exit and southbound entrance
Scott	Georgetown	125.528	202.018	126	US 62 (Cherry Blossom Way) – Georgetown, Cynthiana	
Scott	Georgetown	126.764	204.007	127	KY 3552 (Lexus Way)	Opened November 1, 2016; provides access for Toyota Motor Manufacturing Kentucky
Scott	Georgetown	129.199	207.926	129	KY 620 (Cherry Blossom Way) to US 25 – Georgetown	
Scott	Sadieville	136.468	219.624	136	KY 32 (Porter Road) to US 25 – Sadieville, Cynthiana	
Grant	Corinth	144.443	232.458	144	KY 330 (Owenton Road) – Corinth, Owenton	
Grant	Williamstown	154.175	248.121	154	KY 36 to US 25 – Williamstown, Owenton	
Grant	Williamstown	155.772	250.691	156	KY 1560 (Barnes Road) – Williamstown	
Grant	Dry Ridge	158.544	255.152	159	KY 22 / KY 467 (Broadway Street) – Dry Ridge, Owenton	
Grant	Crittenden	165.901	266.992	166	KY 491 (Violet Road) – Crittenden	
Kenton	No major junctions					
Boone	Walton	171.378	275.806	171	KY 14 / KY 16 (Mary Grubbs Highway) to US 25 – Walton, Verona	
Boone	Walton	173.532	279.273	173	I-71 south – Louisville	South end of I-71 overlap; I-71 exit 77
Boone	Union	175.392	282.266	175	KY 338 (Richwood Drive) to US 25 – Richwood, Union, Walton	
Boone	Union	178.019	286.494	178	KY 536 (Mt. Zion Road) – Union, Independence	
Boone	Florence	180.45	290.41	180	US 127 / US 42 – Florence, Union, Erlanger	Signed as 180B southbound
Boone	Florence	180.464	290.429	180A	Mall Road	No northbound exit; access to Florence Mall
Boone	Florence	181.178	291.578	181	KY 18 (Burlington Pike) – Florence, Burlington	
Boone	Florence	182.378	293.509	182	KY 1017 (Turfway Road) / KY 842 – Florence	Southbound access via right-in/right-out with Thoroughbred Boulevard
Kenton	Erlanger	183.685	295.612	184	KY 236 (Commonwealth Avenue, Donaldson Highway) – Erlanger	Signed as 184B (west) and 184A (east) southbound
Kenton	Erlanger	184.708	297.259	185	I-275 to I-471 north – Cincinnati/Northern Kentucky International Airport	I-275 exit 84
Kenton	Fort Mitchell	186.274	299.779	186	KY 371 (Buttermilk Pike) – Fort Mitchell, Crescent Springs	
Kenton	Fort Mitchell	187.675	302.034	188	US 25 / US 127 / US 42 (Dixie Highway) – Fort Mitchell, Fort Wright	
Kenton	Fort Wright	188.585	303.498	189	KY 1072 (Kyles Lane) – Fort Wright, Park Hills	
Kenton	Covington			190	Jefferson Avenue, Euclid Avenue	Exit removed in 1994
Kenton	Covington	190.453	306.504	191	US 25 / US 127 / US 42 (Pike Street) / Twelfth Street / Martin Luther King Jr. Boulevard – Covington	
Kenton	Covington	191.132	307.597	192	Fifth Street (KY 8) – Covington, Newport	KY 8 not signed; northbound entrance via U-turn at exit 191
Ohio River		191.366– 191.777	307.974– 308.635	Brent Spence Bridge		
Ohio River		191.366– 191.777	307.974– 308.635		I-71 north / I-75 north – Cincinnati	Continuation into Ohio
1.000 mi = 1.609 km; 1.000 km = 0.621 mi: Concurrency terminus; Incomplete access

== Notes ==
Interstate 75
Previous state: Tennessee	Kentucky	Next state: Ohio
