= List of dams and reservoirs in Kentucky =

Following is a list of dams and reservoirs in Kentucky.

All major dams are linked below. The National Inventory of Dams defines any "major dam" as being 50 feet (15 m) tall with a storage capacity of at least 5,000 acre-feet (6,200,000 m^{3}), or of any height with a storage capacity of 25,000 acre-feet (31,000,000 m^{3}).

== Dams and reservoirs in Kentucky ==
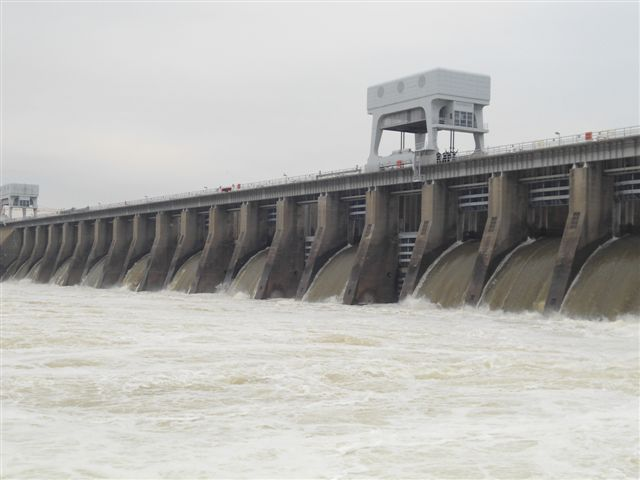
Kentucky Dam spillway

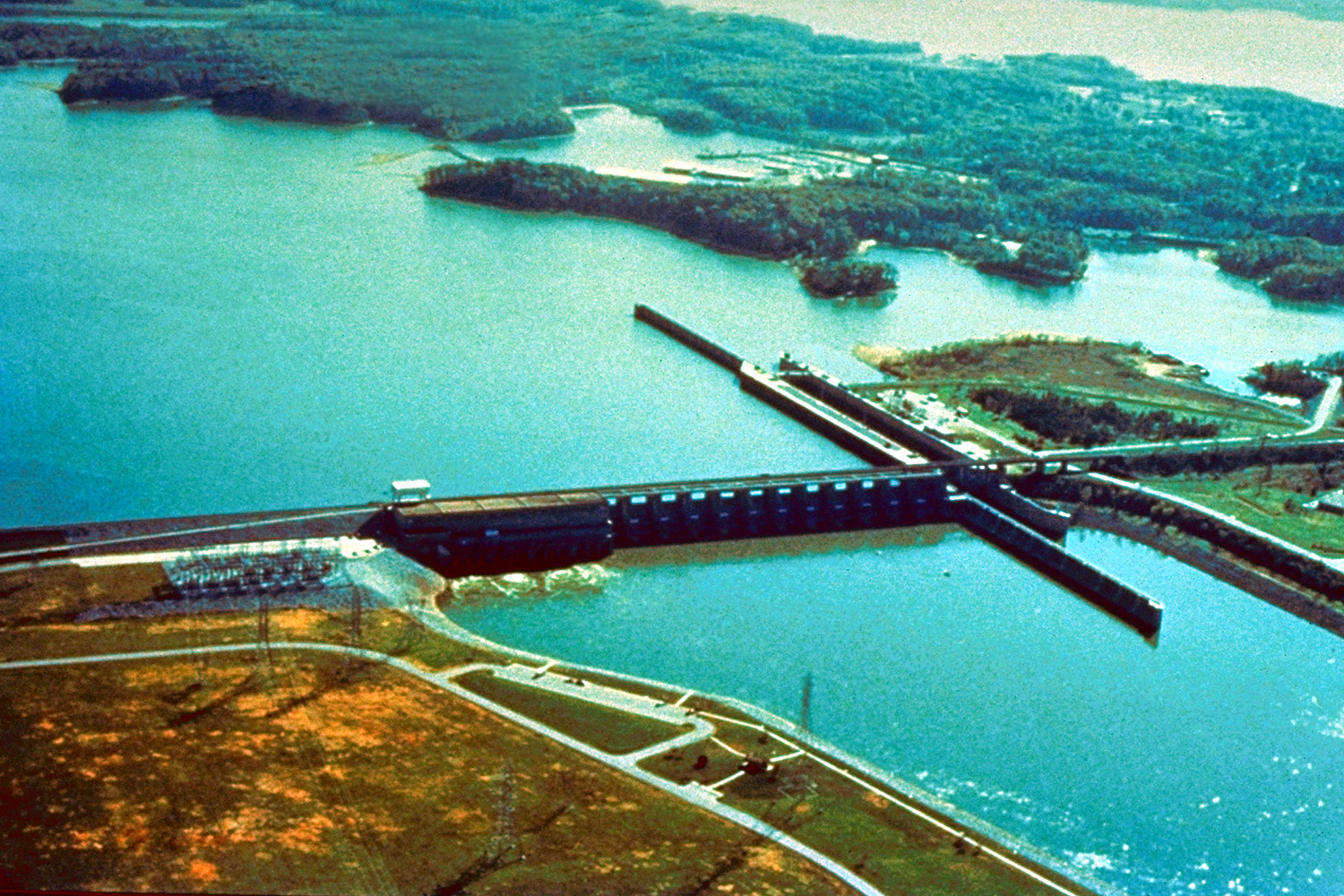
Lake Barkley Lock and Dam, impounding Lake Barkley

This list is incomplete. You can help Wikipedia by expanding it.

- Barkley Dam, Lake Barkley, United States Army Corps of Engineers
- Barren River Lake Dam, Barren River Lake, USACE
- Buckhorn Lake Dam, Buckhorn Lake, USACE
- Cannelton Locks and Dam, Ohio River, USACE (between Indiana and Kentucky)
- Captain Anthony Meldahl Locks and Dam, Ohio River, USACE (between Ohio and Kentucky)
- Cave Run Lake Dam, Cave Run Lake, USACE
- portions of the Dale Hollow Reservoir, dammed in Tennessee, USACE
- Curtis Crum Reservoir, Martin County Water District
- Dewey Dam, Dewey Lake, USACE
- Dix Dam, Herrington Lake, Kentucky Utilities
- Fishtrap Dam, Fishtrap Lake, USACE
- Grayson Dam, Grayson Lake, USACE
- Green River Lake Dam, Green River Lake, USACE
- Greenup Locks and Dam, Ohio River, USACE (between Ohio and Kentucky)
- John T. Myers Locks and Dam, Ohio River, USACE (between Indiana and Kentucky)
- Kentucky Dam, Kentucky Lake, Tennessee Valley Authority
- Laurel River Dam, Laurel River Lake, USACE
- Markland Locks and Dam, Ohio River, USACE (between Indiana and Kentucky)
- McAlpine Locks and Dam, Ohio River, USACE (between Indiana and Kentucky)
- Newburgh Locks and Dam, Ohio River, USACE (between Indiana and Kentucky)
- Nolin Lake Dam, Nolin River Lake, USACE
- Olmsted Locks and Dam, Ohio River, USACE (under construction between Illinois and Kentucky)
- Paintsville Dam, Paintsville Lake, USACE
- Renfro Dam, Lake Linville, Commonwealth of Kentucky
- Rough River Lake Dam, Rough River Lake, USACE
- Smithland Locks and Dam, Ohio River, USACE (between Illinois and Kentucky)
- Taylorsville Lake Dam, Taylorsville Lake, USACE
- Wolf Creek Dam, Lake Cumberland, USACE
- Wood Creek Lake Dam, Wood Creek Lake, Commonwealth of Kentucky
- Yatesville Dam, Yatesville Lake, USACE
