= Red River (Kentucky River tributary) =

Coordinates: 37.8526°N 84.0796°W

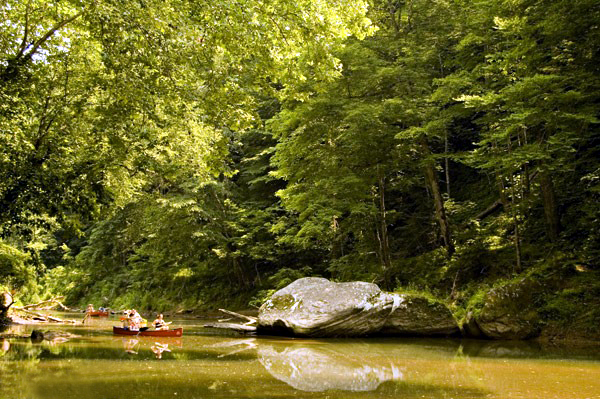
- Red River in the Red River Gorge Geological Area

Location
- Country: United States
- State: Kentucky

Physical characteristics
- Length: 97.2 mi (156.4 km)
- Discharge
  - location: Clay City, Kentucky
  - average: 507 cu/ft. per sec.

National Wild and Scenic River
- Type: Wild, Recreational
- Designated: December 2, 1993

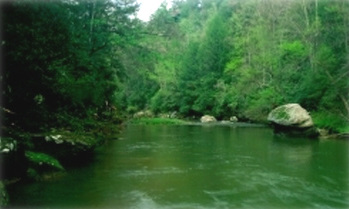
Wild and Scenic Red River in Wolfe County

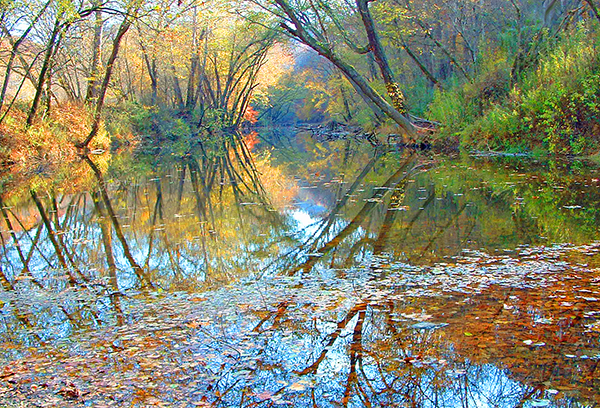
Autumn river landscape on the lower Red River

The Red River is a 97.2-mile-long (156.4 km) tributary of the Kentucky River in east-central Kentucky in the United States. Via the Kentucky and Ohio rivers, it is part of the Mississippi River watershed.

It rises in the mountainous region of the Cumberland Plateau, in eastern Wolfe County, approximately 15 miles (24 km) east of Campton. It flows generally west, through Red River Gorge in the Daniel Boone National Forest, then past Stanton and Clay City. It joins the Kentucky approximately 11 miles (18 km) southeast of Winchester.

In 1993, a 20-mile (32 km) stretch of the river in the Red River Gorge was designated by the federal government as a National Wild and Scenic River.

The book The Unforeseen Wilderness (1971) by Wendell Berry was written to deter the Army Corps of Engineers from damming the Red River Gorge.

== Recreation ==
The largest golden redhorse ever taken in Kentucky (4 lbs., 5 oz.) was taken in the Red River.

== See also ==
- Clifty Wilderness
- List of rivers of Kentucky
