= Clifty Wilderness =

Protected area in Kentucky, US

- IUCN category Ib (wilderness area)
- Location within Kentucky Location within the United States
- Location: Menifee / Wolfe counties, Kentucky, USA
- Nearest city: Campton, Kentucky
- Coordinates: 37°49′45″N 083°33′50″W
- Area: 13,344 acres (54 km^{2})
- Established: 1985
- Governing body: U.S. Forest Service

Clifty Wilderness is a 13,344-acre (54 km^{2}) wilderness area located in the US state of Kentucky. It was designated wilderness in 1985 and is managed by the Cumberland Ranger District of the Daniel Boone National Forest.

Located within the Red River Gorge Geological Area, Clifty Wilderness is a rugged area characterized by high cliffs, steep valleys, numerous sandstone arches, rock shelters, and boulder-strewn creeks.

The Wilderness contains at least 15 sensitive, rare or endangered plant species among more than 750 different flowering plants and 170 species of moss.

== Wild and Scenic River ==
The Wild and Scenic Red River bisects Clifty Wilderness. 9.1 miles (15 km) of the river are designated "wild" and 10.3 miles (17 km) are designated "recreational".

== See also ==
- List of U.S. Wilderness Areas
- Wilderness Act
- Beaver Creek Wilderness
