= Greenbo Lake State Resort Park =

Resort park in Kentucky, United States

- Greenbo Lake

- Location within Kentucky Location within the United States
- Type: Kentucky state park
- Location: Greenup County, Kentucky
- Coordinates: 38°28′51″N 82°52′24″W
- Area: 3,330 acres (1,350 ha)
- Elevation: 883 feet (269 m)
- Created: 1970
- Operator: Kentucky Department of Parks
- Status: Open year-round
- Website: Official website

Greenbo Lake State Resort Park in Kentucky is a resort park in the northeastern part of the commonwealth, close to the town of Greenup, Kentucky in Greenup County on Kentucky State Route 1. It features a 36-room lodge named for Greenup County resident and writer Jesse Hilton Stuart, a 63-site campground with 35 primitive sites, a swimming pool with slides, two tennis courts, an 18-hole miniature golf course, an amphitheater and a scuba refuge area. The lodge contains a 232-seat dining room. It is centered on the 300-acre (120 ha) Greenbo Lake that features a boat dock and marina. There are over 25 miles (40 km) of hiking, biking and horseback trails. The park hosts a variety of community events each year including a quilt show, murder mystery dinner theaters, scrapbooking, and a 5K race.
