= Beaver Creek Wilderness =

Protected area in Kentucky, US

- IUCN category Ib (wilderness area)
- Location within the United States
- Location: McCreary County, Kentucky, United States
- Nearest city: Burnside, Kentucky
- Coordinates: 36°56′44″N 084°26′35″W
- Area: 4,791 acres (19 km^{2})
- Established: 1975
- Governing body: U.S. Forest Service

Beaver Creek Wilderness is a 4,791-acre (19 km^{2}) wilderness area located in the U.S. state of Kentucky. It was designated wilderness in 1975 and is managed by the Stearns Ranger District of the Daniel Boone National Forest. Located beneath the clifflines of the Beaver Creek Drainage, Beaver Creek Wilderness is almost entirely enclosed by sandstone cliffs. Below these high walls are natural arches and rock shelters used by Native Americans and early settlers.

== Wildlife ==
Many species of wildlife can be found in Beaver Creek Wilderness, including wild turkeys, white-tailed deer, ruffed grouse, red and gray foxes, rabbits, muskrats, mink, raccoons, and its namesake beavers. Eastern black bear populations also flourish within the wilderness and surrounding forest.

== See also ==
- List of U.S. Wilderness Areas
- Wilderness Act
- Clifty Wilderness
