= Clays Ferry Bridge =

Bridge in Central Kentucky, United States

Coordinates: 37.8838°N 84.3393°W

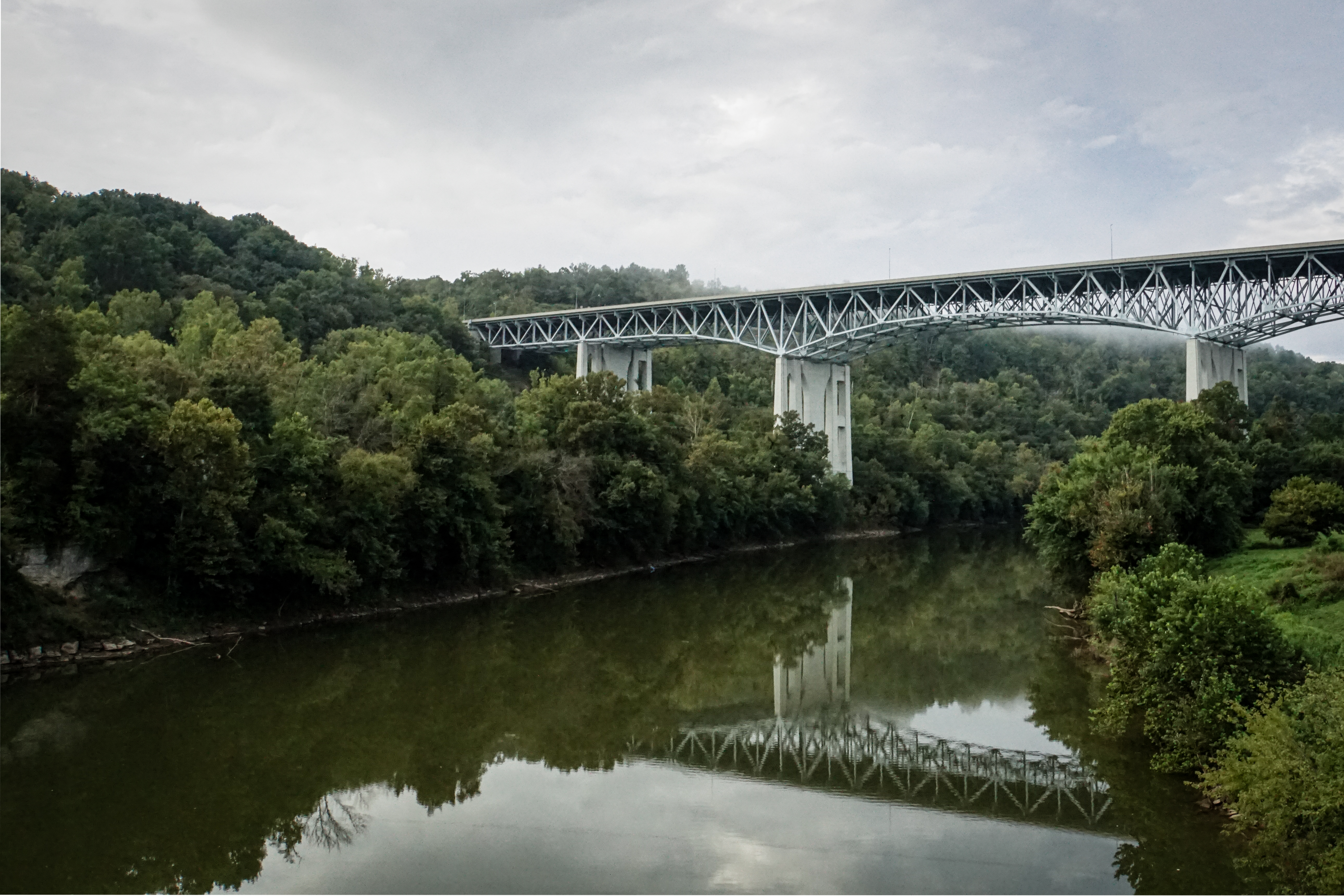
Clay's Ferry Bridge spanning the Kentucky River, taken from the deck of the Old Clay's Ferry Bridge, September 2022

The Clay's Ferry Bridge is a bridge that carries Interstate 75 along with US 25 and US 421 across the Kentucky River between Madison and Fayette counties.

The original bridge at the site, the Old Clay's Ferry Bridge was constructed in 1869 and is still in use as a local road carrying Kentucky Route 2328. A new bridge was constructed in 1941 with a second span added in 1963. This new bridge was reconfigured in 1998, with the piers from the old bridges retained to support a completely new superstructure.

== Old bridge ==
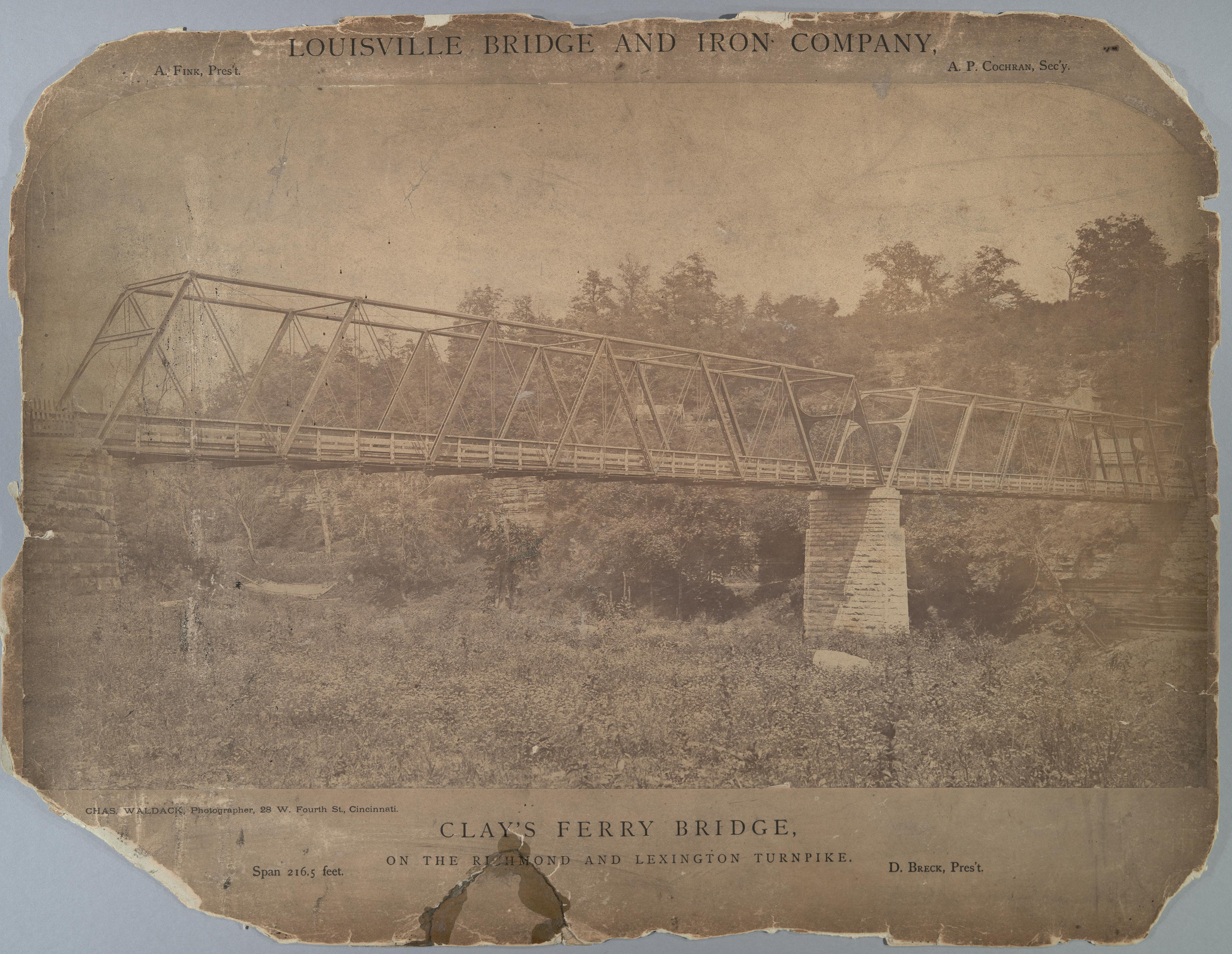
Old Clay's Ferry Bridge in 1870

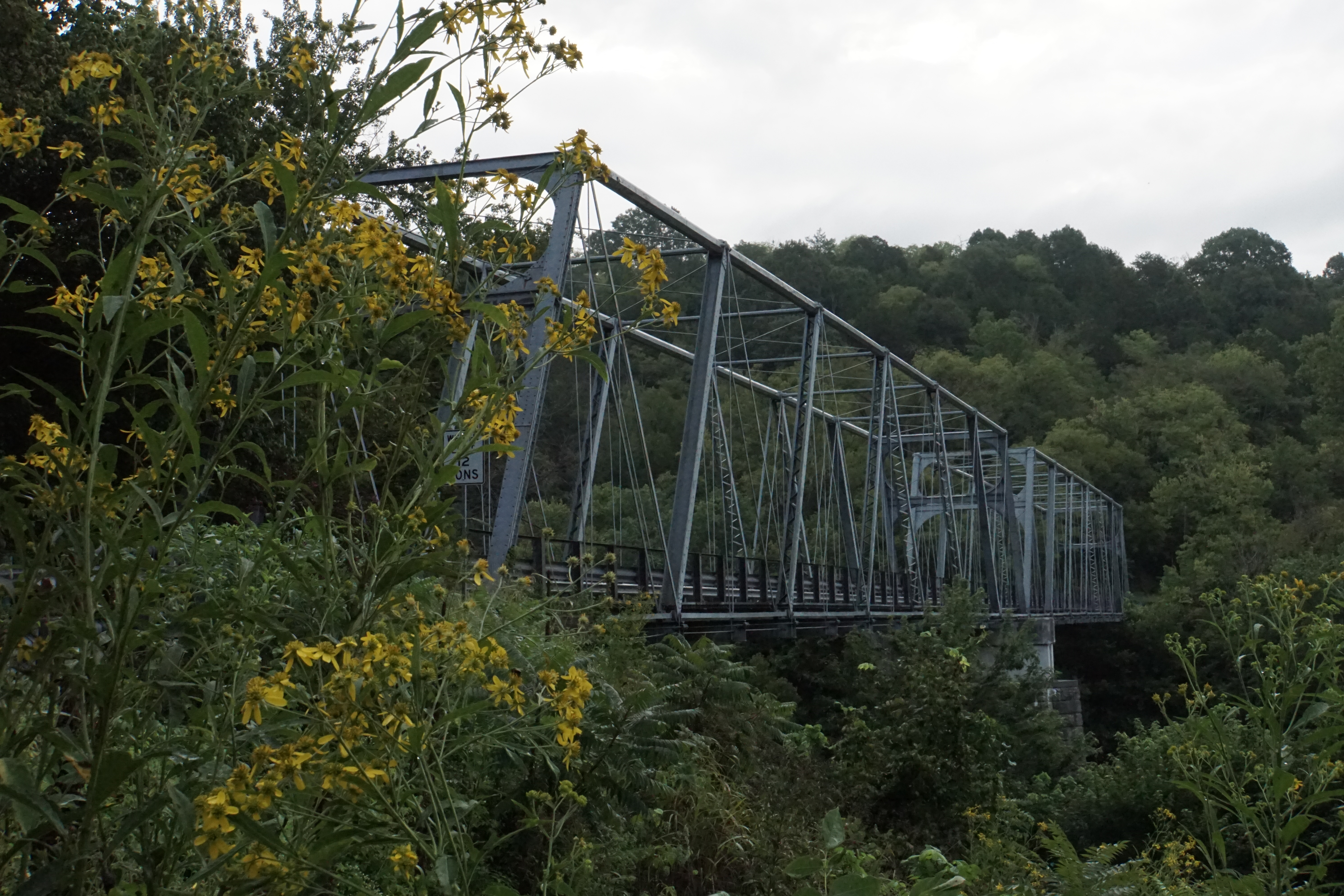
Old Clay's Ferry Bridge in 2022

The first Clay's Ferry Bridge was opened in 1869. Prior to this, service across the Kentucky River was provided by ferry, which had been established since 1792.

In 1906, the bridge was purchased by the newly formed Clays Ferry Bridge Company.

After the State of Kentucky purchased the crossing on April 1, 1929, the bridge was made part of US 25. Despite this, the bridge's tolls were not removed until December 24, 1930.

In 1955, the low rise bridge was given a rehabilitation.

== New bridge ==
=== Original configuration ===
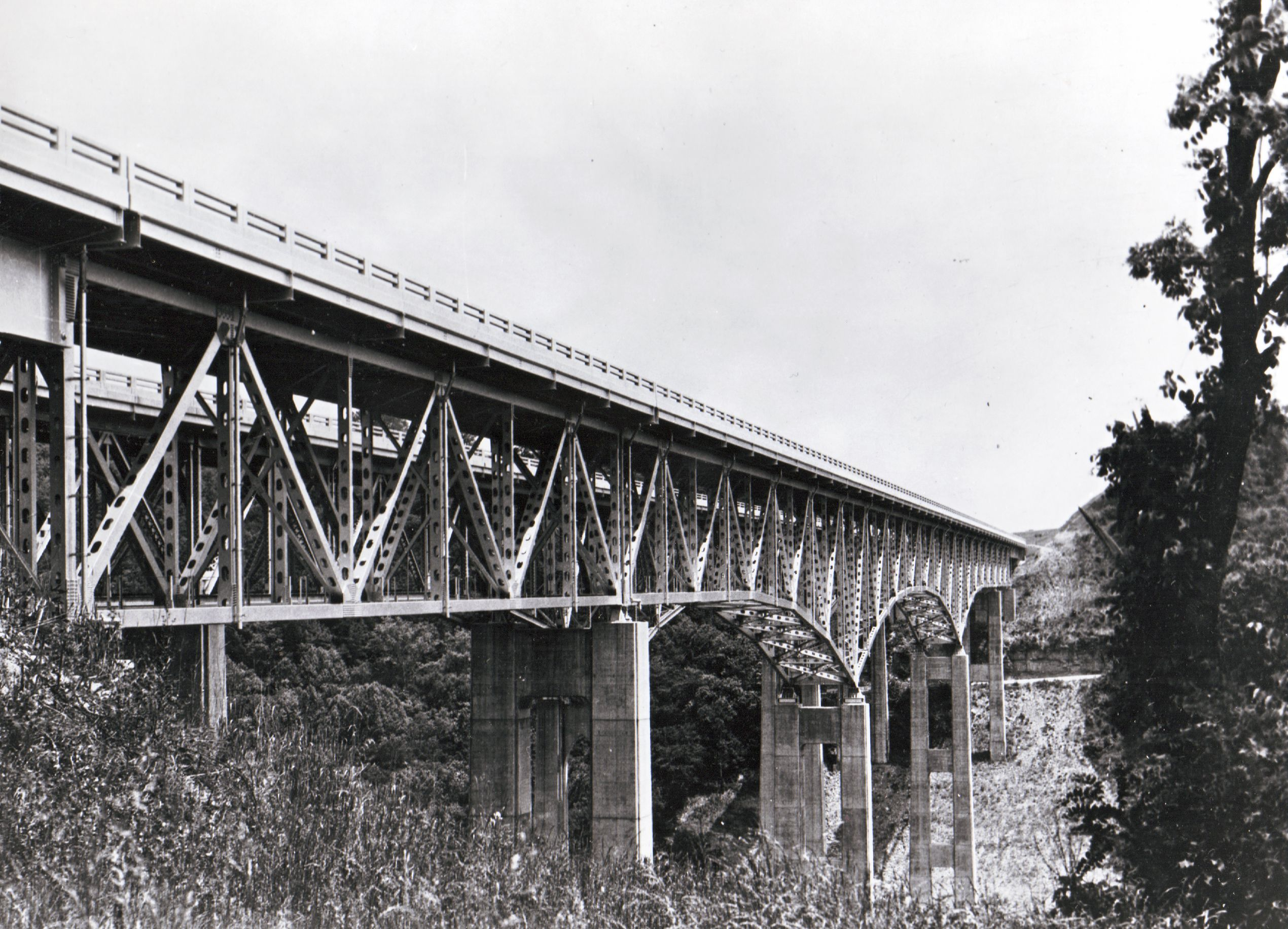
The new bridge in its original configuration in 1967

On February 6, 1941, plans for a new high-rise span were announced. It was estimated to cost around $935,279. Approval for the construction of the new Clay's Ferry Bridge was granted by the Secretary of War on September 12, and work on this new span began on October 1. Even though World War II-related steel rationing delayed completion of the superstructure, the piers were completed on January 7, 1943. Steel was eventually obtained. After multiple delays related to winter weather, the bridge was officially opened to traffic on August 17, 1946. It was 280 feet (85 m) above the river level and was the tallest bridge east of the Mississippi after completion, with a total length of 1,736 feet (529 m).

In 1951, US route 421 was routed over the high rise bridge.

In 1963, a twin high-rise bridge was completed just south of the existing bridge and traffic ran in two lanes in each direction, With the completion of this new span, the original span was made northbound only.

=== Current bridge ===
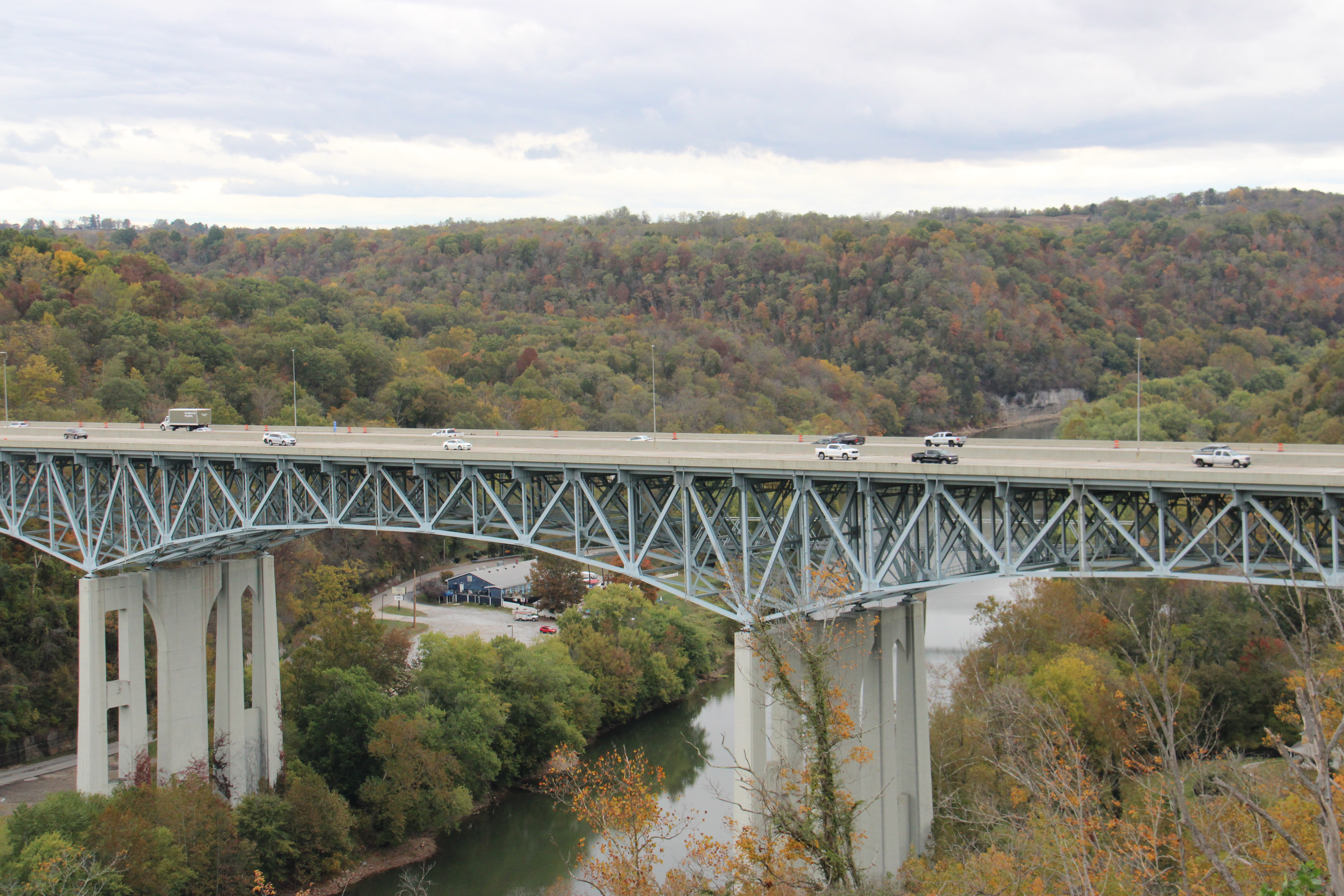
The bridge in 2023. The three piers built in different decades support a single superstructure.

After over two decades of use, a fatigue analysis of the Clays Ferry Bridge was completed. This was conducted in 1988 by Theodore Hopwood II, and Vishwas G. Oka, from the Kentucky Transportation Center Research, Report 539. In 1989, plans were announced to demolish the 1946 and 1963 bridge's superstructures and build a third pier. At this point, a new unified superstructure would be constructed across all three. This allowed for the addition of an extra vehicular lane plus shoulders. Construction started on January 6, 1994.

On February 29, 1996, a crane leaned forward at a 30-degree angle while attempting to lift a 17-ton steel beam, nearly collapsing the bridge. Fearing the crane might fall into the river, engineers closed the bridge until 11:15 p.m. In this span of time, a new crane was brought in to carry the steel beam, in addition to stabilizing the crane. The operator chose to drop the beam onto the river bank, preventing it from falling off. This beam was the only item damaged during the incident.

In the summer of 1998, crews finished painting, and by November, the entire project was completed. Each northbound/southbound roadway is 60 feet (18 m) wide, and total traffic over the bridge was 75,000 vehicles per day in 2015.

A resurfacing of the bridge began on August 1, 2021, and was projected to be completed by October 27. It was completed ahead of schedule on October 11.
