= Lake Carnico =

- Location within Kentucky
- Location: Nicholas County, Kentucky
- Coordinates: 38°20′49″N 84°02′28″W
- Type: artificial lake
- Basin countries: United States
- Surface area: 114 acres (46 ha)

Lake Carnico is a 114-acre (0.46 km^{2}) reservoir in Nicholas County, Kentucky. It was constructed in 1962. The name Lake Carnico came alive from a name contest that was held by Charles Cox from July 27, 1961, to August 5, 1961. Departments such as the Kentucky Department of Fish and Wildlife, the Kentucky Highway Department, and the "Chain of Lakes" state legislation, built a dam and started building properties to surround Lake Carnico. The geography aspect about Lake Carnico is that the water is fresh and the type of fish that live in the lake are Sunfish, Channel Catfish, Flathead and much more. The name of the group of citizens who found Lake Carnico is unknown till this day.
