= Autumn Ridge, Lexington =

Autumn Ridge
- Neighborhood
- Interactive map of Autumn Ridge
- Country: United States
- State: Kentucky
- County: Fayette
- City: Lexington

Area
  - Total: .168 sq mi (0.44 km^{2})
  - Water: 0 sq mi (0.0 km^{2})

Population (2000)
  - Total: 645
  - Density: 3,850/sq mi (1,490/km^{2})
- Time zone: UTC-5 (Eastern (EST))
  - Summer (DST): UTC-4 (EDT)
- ZIP code: 40509
- Area code: 859
- Website: autumnridge.org

Autumn Ridge is a neighborhood in southeastern Lexington, Kentucky, United States. Its boundaries are I-75 to the east, Barnard Drive to the south, Todds Road to the west, and Vero Court to the north.

== Neighborhood statistics ==
- Area: 0.168 square miles (0.44 km^{2})
- Population: 645
- Population density: 3,850 people per square mile
- Median household income: $99,526
