= Radcliffe, Lexington =

Radcliffe
- Neighborhood of Lexington, Kentucky
- Interactive map of Radcliffe
- Coordinates: 38.078°N 84.467°W
- Country: United States
- State: Kentucky
- County: Fayette
- City: Lexington

Area
  - Total: 0.53 sq mi (1.36 km^{2})

Population (2000)
  - Total: 1,853
  - Density: 3,530/sq mi (1,362/km^{2})
- Time zone: UTC-5 (Eastern (EST))
  - Summer (DST): UTC-4 (EDT)
- ZIP code: 40505
- Area code: 859

Radcliffe is a neighborhood in northern Lexington, Kentucky, United States. It is alternatively called Marlboro. Its boundaries are Dover Road to the south, Paris Pike to the east, Russell Cave Road to the west, and I-75/ I-64 to the north.

== Neighborhood statistics ==
- Area: 0.526 square miles (1.36 km^{2})
- Population: 1,853
- Population density: 3,522 people per square mile (1,360 people/km^{2})
- Median household income: $57,218
