= Shelby Lake =

Lake in Kentucky, United States

- Location within Kentucky Location within the United States
- Location: Ballard County, Kentucky
- Coordinates: 37°11′12″N 89°01′43″W
- Basin countries: United States
- Surface area: 100 acres (40 ha)
- Surface elevation: 312 ft (95 m)

Shelby Lake is a 100-acre (0.40 km^{2}) natural lake in Ballard County, Kentucky, and is one of only three major natural lakes in the state. It is part of the Ballard County Wildlife Management Area and owned by the Kentucky Department of Fish and Wildlife Resources.
