= Joyland, Lexington =

Joyland
- Neighborhood of Lexington, Kentucky
- Interactive map of Joyland
- Coordinates: 38.088°N 84.457°W
- Country: United States
- State: Kentucky
- County: Fayette
- City: Lexington

Area
  - Total: 1.4 sq mi (3.5 km^{2})

Population (2000)
  - Total: 2,940
  - Density: 2,200/sq mi (840/km^{2})
- Time zone: UTC-5 (Eastern (EST))
  - Summer (DST): UTC-4 (EDT)
- ZIP code: 40505
- Area code: 859

Joyland is a neighborhood in Northeast Lexington, Kentucky, United States. Its boundaries are I-75/ I-64 to the south, Paris Pike to the east, Russell Cave Road to the west, and the Lexington Urban Growth Boundary to the north. Joyland is the only north Lexington neighborhood to be located entirely north of I-75.

== Neighborhood statistics ==
- Area: 1.334 square miles (3.5 km^{2})
- Population: 2,940
- Population density: 2,204 people per square mile (851 people/km^{2})
- Median household income: $43,095
