= Wilgreen Lake =

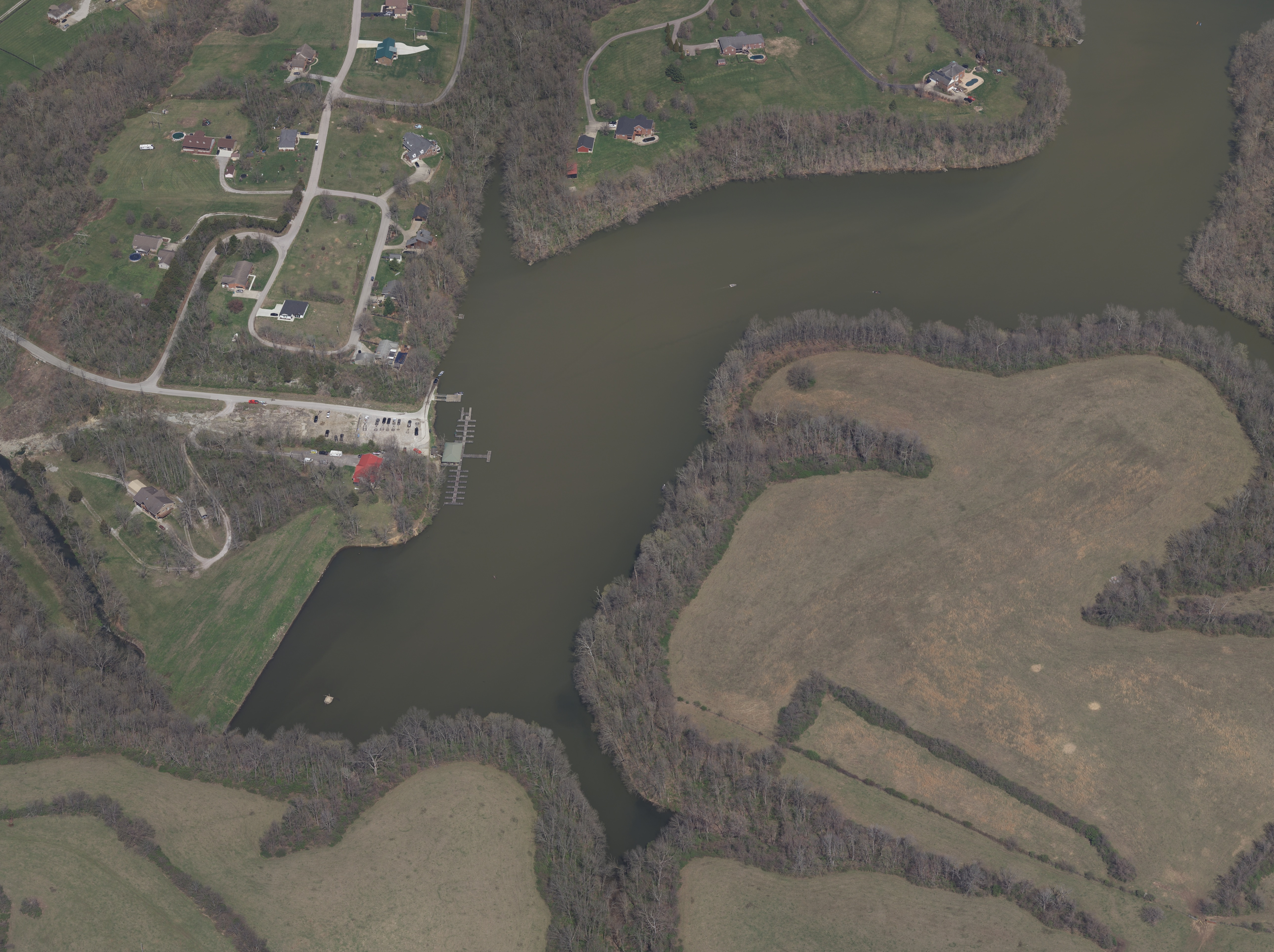
- Southern end of Wilgreen Lake

- Location within Kentucky
- Location: Madison County, Kentucky
- Coordinates: 37°42′30″N 84°21′0″W
- Type: reservoir
- Basin countries: United States
- Surface area: 169 acres (68 ha)
- Surface elevation: 825 feet (250 m)

Wilgreen Lake is a 169-acre (0.68 km^{2}) reservoir in Madison County, Kentucky. It was constructed in 1966.
