= Swan Lake (Kentucky) =

Lake in Ballard County, Kentucky, United States

- Location within Kentucky Location within the United States
- Location: Ballard County, Kentucky
- Coordinates: 37°00′45″N 89°07′05″W
- Basin countries: United States
- Surface area: 300 acres (1.2 km^{2})
- Surface elevation: 302 ft (92 m)

Swan Lake is a lake in Ballard County, Kentucky. At 300 acres (1.2 km^{2}), it is the largest natural lake in Kentucky. It is part of a twelve-lake confederation known as Cummins Tract Lakes.
