= Greenbo Lake =

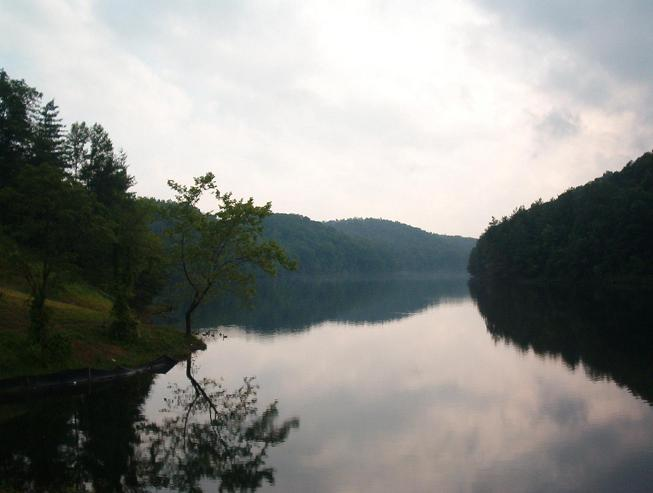
- as seen from the dam (June 2003)

- Location within Kentucky
- Location: Greenup County, Kentucky
- Coordinates: 38°29′27″N 082°51′58″W
- Type: reservoir
- Primary inflows: Claylick Creek; Buffalo Branch
- Primary outflows: Claylick Creek
- Catchment area: Little Sandy River
- Basin countries: United States
- Surface area: 181 acres (73 ha)
- Surface elevation: 607 ft (185 m)

Greenbo Lake is a 181-acre (0.73 km^{2}) reservoir nestled in the Appalachian foothills of Greenup County, Kentucky. The lake was jointly created in 1955 by the Greenbo Lake Association (a group of residents who desired to create a recreation attraction in their area) and the Kentucky Department of Fish and Wildlife Resources. Its distinctive name derives from the combination of the names of the county it is located in and nearby Boyd County. The association held a competition for the naming of this lake and the winner picked the name.

== Attractions ==
The lake, known as a wonderful spot for largemouth bass, is located within Greenbo Lake State Resort Park. The park, covering more than 3,000 acres (12 km^{2}), features camping, fishing, boating, dining and golf, as well as scenic trails for biking and hiking.

== See also ==
- Greenbo Lake State Resort Park
