= Wood Creek Lake =

- Location within Kentucky
- Location: Laurel County, Kentucky
- Coordinates: 37°12′0″N 84°11′20″W
- Type: reservoir
- Primary inflows: Wood Creek
- Primary outflows: Wood Creek
- Basin countries: United States
- Surface area: 672 acres (272 ha)
- Average depth: 35 feet (11 m)
- Max. depth: 127 feet (39 m)
- Surface elevation: 1,020 feet (310 m)

Wood Creek Lake is a 672-acre (2.72 km^{2}) reservoir in Laurel County, Kentucky. Created by impounding Wood Creek in 1969, the lake is in the middle of Daniel Boone National Forest.

Wood Creek Lake Dam is a rock-fill dam, 163 feet (50 m) high and 800 feet (240 m) long at its crest, with a maximum capacity of 29,101 acre-feet (35,896,000 m^{3}). The dam and lake are owned by the Commonwealth of Kentucky.
