= Grayson Lake =

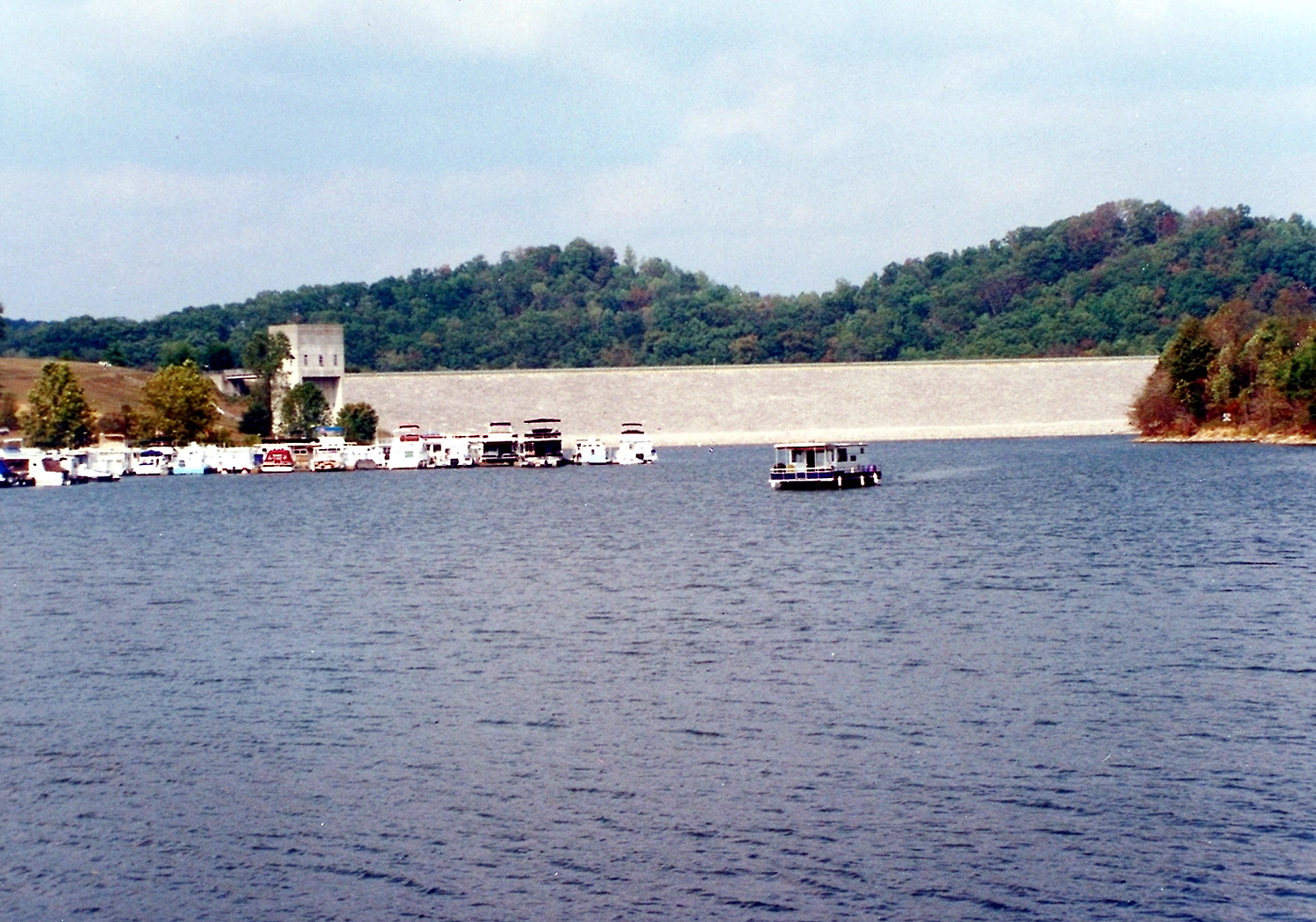
- Lake and Dam

- Location within Kentucky
- Location: Carter / Elliott counties, Kentucky, United States
- Coordinates: 38°15′5.5″N 82°59′1.88″W
- Type: artificial lake
- Primary inflows: Little Sandy River
- Primary outflows: Little Sandy River
- Basin countries: United States
- Surface area: 1,500 acres (6.1 km^{2})
- Max. depth: 60 ft (18 m)
- Water volume: 118,990 acre⋅ft (0.14677 km^{3}) Max
- Surface elevation: 643 ft (196 m)

Grayson Lake is a 1,500-acre (6.1 km^{2}) reservoir in Carter and Elliott counties in Kentucky. It was created by the United States Army Corps of Engineers in 1968 by impounding the Little Sandy River with the Grayson Dam, an earthen structure 120 feet (37 m) high, creating a maximum capacity of 118,990 acre-feet (146,770,000 m^{3}). Sections of Kentucky Route 7 were re-routed as a result of the lake's creation. KY 7 now traverses a modern highway stretch around the park, crossing the dam also.

The lake is the major attraction of Grayson Lake State Park.

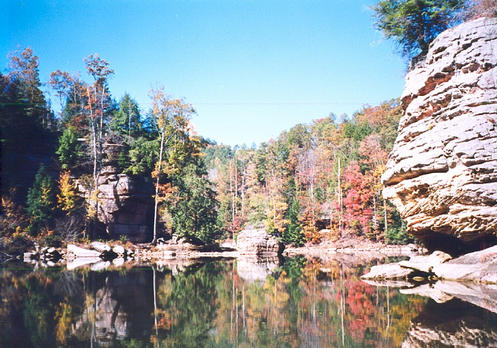
An eye level image from the lake, showing trees turning colors for Autumn.

== See also ==
- Grayson Lake State Park
