= Boltz Lake =

- Location within Kentucky Location within the United States
- Location: Grant County, Kentucky
- Coordinates: 38°42′13″N 84°36′51″W
- Type: reservoir
- Basin countries: United States
- Surface area: 92 acres (37 ha)
- Surface elevation: 820 ft (250 m)

Boltz Lake, located in Grant County, Kentucky, is a 92-acre (37 ha) reservoir.
