= Daniel Boone National Forest =

National forest in Kentucky

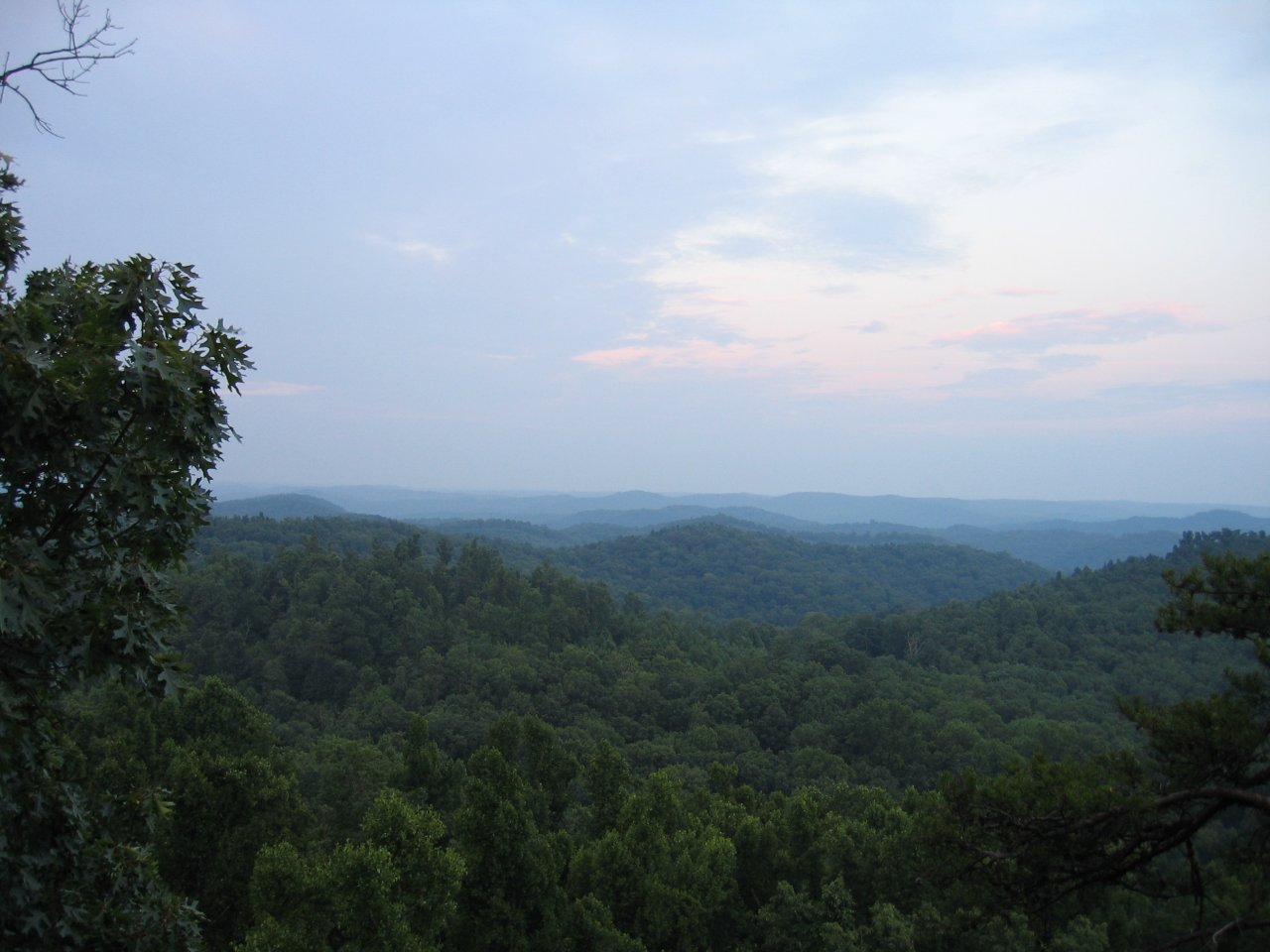
- View from Tater Knob in the Daniel Boone National Forest
- Location: Kentucky, US
- Coordinates: 37°17′17″N 83°52′31″W
- Area: 2,100,000 acres (8,500 km^{2})(proclamation boundary); 706,000 acres (286,000 ha) (Forest Service)
- Established: February 23, 1937
- Named for: Daniel Boone
- Visitors: 2,507,000 (in 2004)
- Governing body: U.S. Forest Service
- Website: Daniel Boone National Forest

The Daniel Boone National Forest (originally the Cumberland National Forest) is a national forest in Kentucky, United States. Established in 1937, it includes 708,000 acres (287,000 ha) of federally owned land within a 2,100,000-acre (850,000 ha) proclamation boundary. The name of the forest was changed in 1966 in honor of the explorer Daniel Boone.

The terrain of the forest is generally rugged, and includes multiple prominent water features. It is home to a range of plant and animal species, although many areas still bear evidence of industrial logging and other practices which took place mostly prior to federal protection. It is a popular recreational and tourist destination which serves a million or more visitors a year, and contains several widely recognized areas which are protected in their own right, including state parks, trails, wilderness areas, and landmarks.

== Physical geography ==
As of 2017 the Daniel Boone National Forest encompasses 708,000 acres (287,000 ha) of federally owned land within a 2,100,000-acre (850,000 ha) proclamation boundary. The land within the proclamation boundary contains both publicly and privately owned land, along with thousands of miles of marked boundary lines between the two. Most privately owned land, accounting for about 1,378,410 acres (557,820 ha) is held by individuals and ranges from 100 acres (40 ha) to 300 acres (120 ha) in size.

The forest is formed by two main areas: a 140-mile (230 km) wide strip of land along the western edge of the Cumberland Plateau, and the Redbird Purchase, located on the east of the Cumberland Plateau. The terrain is generally rugged, hilly and mountainous, with reliefs of as much as 200 feet (61 m) in the north and 2,000 feet (610 m) toward the south. Administratively, the forest is divided into four ranger districts: Cumberland London, Redbird, and Stearns.

=== Counties ===
The Daniel Boone National Forest includes land across 21 Kentucky counties, namely:

1. Bath
2. Clay
3. Estill
4. Harlan
5. Jackson
6. Knox
7. Laurel
8. Lee
9. Leslie
10. McCreary
11. Menifee
12. Morgan
13. Owsley
14. Perry
15. Powell
16. Pulaski
17. Rockcastle
18. Rowan
19. Wayne
20. Whitley
21. Wolfe

=== Water ===
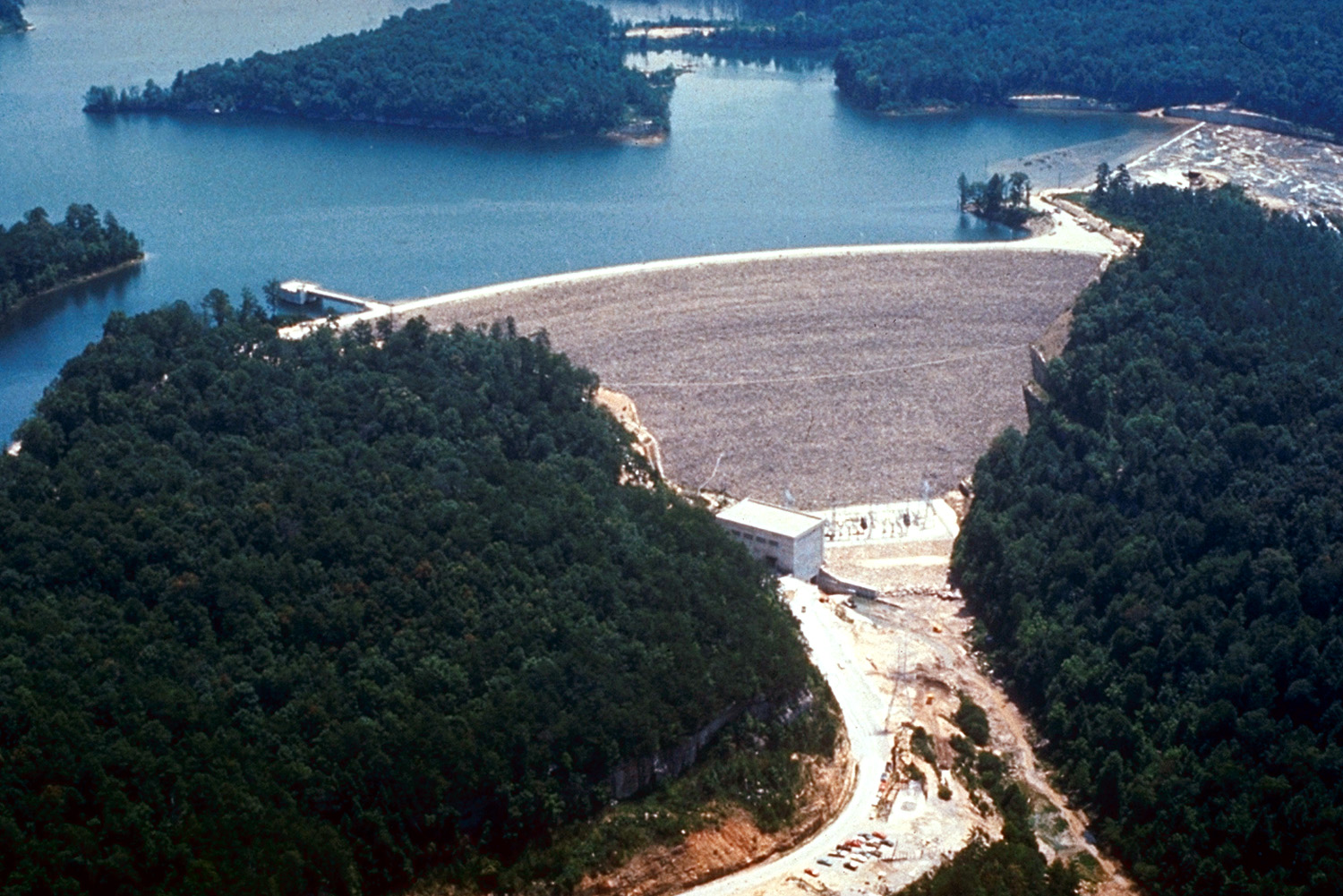
Aerial view of the dam at Laurel River Lake

Major river systems include the Licking River, Kentucky River, and Cumberland River, all of which flow into the Ohio River. Four reservoirs are located within the forest, administered by the US Army Corps of Engineers. These are Cave Run Lake, Buckhorn Lake, Lake Cumberland and Laurel River Lake. Taken together, at normal water levels these reservoirs comprise 63,850 acres (25,840 ha) of water. The forest additionally encompasses thousands of miles of smaller streams, many of which flow only after heavy rain. About 12,500 acres (5,100 ha) are classified as riparian zones, while 7,000 acres (2,800 ha) are classified as floodplains or wetlands.

Water is of an overall good quality, but is impacted by activities related to mining, and exploration for oil and gas. The area averages 46 inches (1,200 mm) of rainfall annually, with thunderstorms occurring an average of 46 days per year. Due to shallow soil, heavy rains may result in severe local flooding, and conversely, many tributaries may become completely dry during periods of little rainfall.

=== Air ===
Air quality in the forest is considered "excellent", due to the comparatively sparse population and lack of industry. The majority of air pollution results from the 128 average annual forest fires, (Note: Of these 128, the Forest Service estimated in 1985 that 126 were man made, and on average burned a total of 1,869 acres (756 ha) per year. Approximately 1% of fires were believed to be caused by lightning strike.) in addition to controlled burning, the residential burning of coal, and dust from unpaved roads.

== History ==
=== European exploration until statehood ===
By the early 16th century both the French and the British had laid claim to the land that would become the Daniel Boone National Forest. Among the first Europeans to enter the area was the French René-Robert Cavelier, Sieur de La Salle in 1669. He was later followed by the party of the English Thomas Walker in 1750, who would go on to make the first European discoveries of the Cumberland Gap, Cumberland River, and the pass through Pine Mountain (Note: near modern day Pineville, Kentucky) Several others made expeditions in the area over the following decades with mixed success. (Note: This included John Findley from 1752 to 1753; James McBride in 1754; a party of 19 unnamed Virginians in 1761, 1763, and 1764; Isaac Lindsey in 1767; and John Swift in 1761, 1762, 1764, 1764-68, and 1768-69.)

Around 1760, Daniel Boone reached an understanding with Richard Henderson for the exploration and preparation of the wilderness beyond the Appalachian Mountains, so that it may be more easily settled by those who sought to move westward. Boone made an expedition in 1767 into the area of modern-day Prestonsburg, Kentucky, and then in 1769, he set out with five others on an extended expedition through the Cumberland Gap and into Kentucky, where he stayed until March 1771. Boone set out on a failed attempt at settlement in 1773, and then again in 1774, where he served as an officer in Lord Dunmore's War.

On March 17, 1775, the Transylvania Colony, founded by Henderson, and for which Boone was employed, reached an agreement (over the objections of the governors of Virginia and North Carolina) with a grand counsel of the Cherokee Nation to purchase all land from the Kentucky River to the Cumberland River, including large part of modern-day Kentucky and Tennessee, an area known as the Transylvania Purchase. (Note: The land was purchased for 10,000 pounds in currency and trade goods.) In anticipation of this purchase, Boone and a party were dispatched on March 10, marking and clearing trails in the newly acquired lands, and eventually founding Fort Boone, near the confluence of Station Camp Creek and the Kentucky River. (Note: Near modern day Irvine, Kentucky) This became the fledgling Transylvania Colony, until being eliminated in 1778 by the Virginia House of Delegates, becoming Kentucky County, Virginia, and by 1792, the Commonwealth of Kentucky.

=== Industrial use ===
Up to the beginning of the 20th century, the Daniel Boone and surrounding forest were the subject of extensive logging, with logs sent downstream for processing in the sawmills of Louisville, Nashville, Frankfort and Cincinnati, only to be overtaken as rail extended into the area around the turn of the century. The industry reached its peak in 1907, with almost one billion board feet of lumber production. The forest was additionally harvested to provide charcoal for the developing iron industry, and as the railroad advanced, to produce crossties, and lumber for the building of bridges in addition to rail cars.

=== Federal protection ===
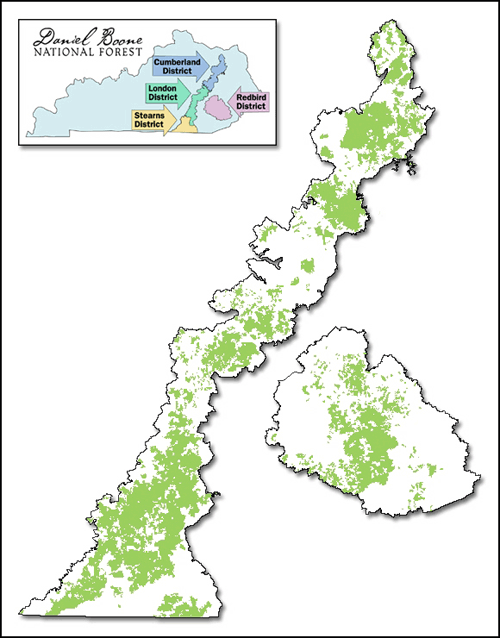
Daniel Boone National Forest as of 2016. The black line is the proclamation boundary. Green represents Forest Service land. White areas within the boundary are privately or locally owned. The inset map shows the ranger districts.

In 1900, Congress appropriated $5,000, and again in 1907, $25,000 for the investigation of areas in southern Appalachia, for potential purchase as a national forest. These efforts were further strengthened in 1911 by passage of the Weeks Act, which allocated millions in additional funding. As part of the Forest Service's examination of the area, E. Murray Bruner published in 1914 an extensive report covering 900,000 acres (360,000 ha) of land in Kentucky, and concluded in part:

Because of the general rugged topography of this section and very great influence it exerts upon navigation of the Kentucky River, it is very essential that its protection from extensive clearing be assured. For these reasons the section is eminently desirable as a purchase area, and therefore, in view of the fact that the prices of land now prevailing are very reasonable, there is a favorable prospect for making large purchases...

Land acquisition began in 1933, based largely on the purchase of 48,000 acres (19,000 ha) from Stearns Coal and Lumber, 27,000 acres (11,000 ha) acres from Castle Craig Coal, and 22,000 acres (8,900 ha) from the Warfork Land Company. By the time the area was officially declared the Cumberland National Forest in 1937, the tract spanned 409,567 acres (165,746 ha) of federally owned land across 16 Kentucky counties.

Both Daniel Boone (Note: Both stylized as his full name, as well as shortened to simply "Boone") and Henry Clay were originally put forth in the 1930s as potential namesakes. However, it was not until 1966, following, among other things, a resolution to the United States Department of Agriculture by the Kentucky Senate, that the name was officially changed by Lyndon B. Johnson to Daniel Boone National Forest on April 11. The same year, some 300,000 acres (120,000 ha) of the Redbird Unit were added.

On May 16, 2025, a deadly EF4 tornado moved through the forest. Nineteen people were killed in the communities of Somerset and London, located to the east and west of the forest, respectively.

== Ecology ==
The Daniel Boone National Forest contains around 40 commercial species of trees, and as many non-commercial species of trees and shrubs. These include mixed hardwoods such as oaks and hickories, in addition to white and yellow pine. Because much of the area was intensely logged prior to federal land protections, much of the forest is of low quality, although areas of younger growth is of a higher quality, having been always a part of protected lands. As of 1985, when the forest service published their environmental evaluation of the area, about 92% of the land was considered "tentatively suitable" for the production of timber.

The area is home to 54 species and subspecies of mammals, 194 of birds, 44 of reptiles, 41 of amphibians, and 150 of fish. Notable animals that inhabit this forest frequently seen by visitors include black bear, coyote, bobcat, white-tailed deer, wild turkey, gray squirrel, muskrat, quail, opossum, ruffed grouse, rabbit, red and gray fox species, raccoon and mourning dove. Other species present are the woodchuck, red-cockaded woodpecker, mink, bald eagle, Virginia big-eared bat, Indiana bat and gray bat. Venomous species include the copperhead, timber rattlesnake, and southern devil scorpion. Fish species include rainbow trout, large and smallmouth bass, bluegill, crappie, and muskie.

== Recreation ==
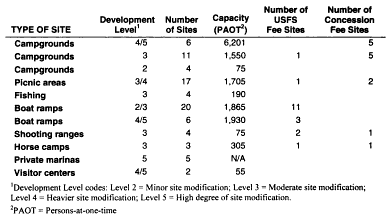
Summary of major developed recreation facilities by development level and capacity, from the US Forest Service

The Daniel Boone National Forest provides a range of recreational activities, including approximately 100 developed recreation areas and 600 miles (970 km) of trails, that see more than a million visitors per year. (Note: Erwin, writing in 2014 put the number of annual visitors at five million; however, because this report appears to conflict with that given by the Federal Government, it's not clear what the source of the five million figure might be.) Across the forest, developed recreation sites have a combined capacity to accommodate 15,830 visitors at-a-time, in addition to the capacity of dispersed recreational activities such as hiking, mountain biking, rock climbing, boating and horse riding.

Within the forest's boundaries lie three state managed parks, Buckhorn Lake, Cumberland Falls, and Natural Bridge. There is one designated National Recreation Area, the Big South Fork, located in the southwest corner of the forest, and one National Recreation Trail, the Sheltowee Trace, which stretches almost 290 miles (470 km) from northern Kentucky to Pickett CCC Memorial State Park near Jamestown, Tennessee. (Note: National Geographic reported the length of the trail at 269 miles (433 km)) There are two designated wilderness areas, Beaver Creek, consisting of 4,877 acres (1,974 ha) set aside in 1975, and Clifty Wilderness, consisting of 12,646 acres (5,118 ha) near the Red River Gorge. The Red River Gorge itself is a designated National Natural Landmark, along with the Rock Creek Natural Research Area.

Hunting is also popular as a recreational activity. The Pioneer Weapons Wildlife Management Area, representing 7,610 acres (3,080 ha) near Cave Run Lake, was created as a partnership between Kentucky Department of Fish and Wildlife Resources and the US Forest Service, and is an area where hunters are permitted to use only comparatively primitive weapons, such muzzleloaders, bow and arrow, or crossbows.

== See also ==
- List of national forests of the United States
- Red Bird Purchase Unit
