= Lake Linville =

Reservoir in eastern Kentucky, U.S.

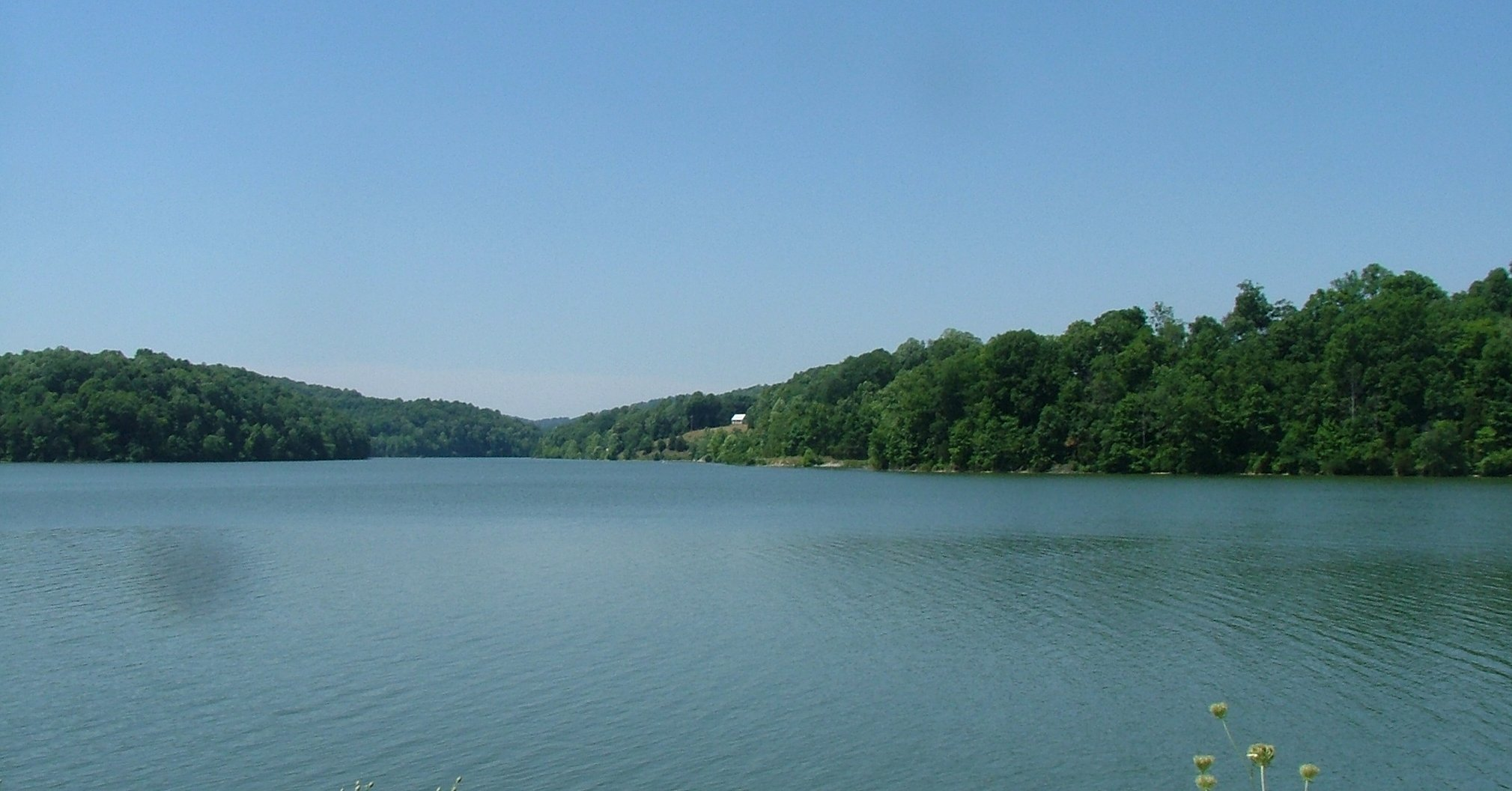
- View of Lake looking west

- Location within Kentucky
- Location: Rockcastle County, Kentucky, United States
- Coordinates: 37°23′19″N 84°20′44″W
- Basin countries: United States
- Surface area: 356 acres (144 ha)
- Average depth: 16 ft (4.9 m)
- Max. depth: 36 ft (11 m)
- Shore length^{1}: 7.9 mi (12.7 km)
- Surface elevation: 969 ft (295 m)
- ^{1} Shore length is not a well-defined measure.

Lake Linville is a 356-acre (1.44 km^{2}) reservoir in Rockcastle County, Kentucky. It was created in 1968 by the construction of the earthen Renfro Dam, 72 feet (22 m) high with a length of 1,100 feet (340 m), owned and operated by the Commonwealth of Kentucky. The dam is a highway fill embankment along Interstate 75.

== Facilities ==
Facilities include a launching ramp, boat dock, campground, splash pad and parking area. Boats, live bait, and tackle are available.

== Fishery ==
Species in the lake include largemouth bass, smallmouth bass, spotted bass, white crappie, hybrid bass, channel catfish, bluegill, longear sunfish, carp, and yellow Bullhead.
