= Laurel River Lake =

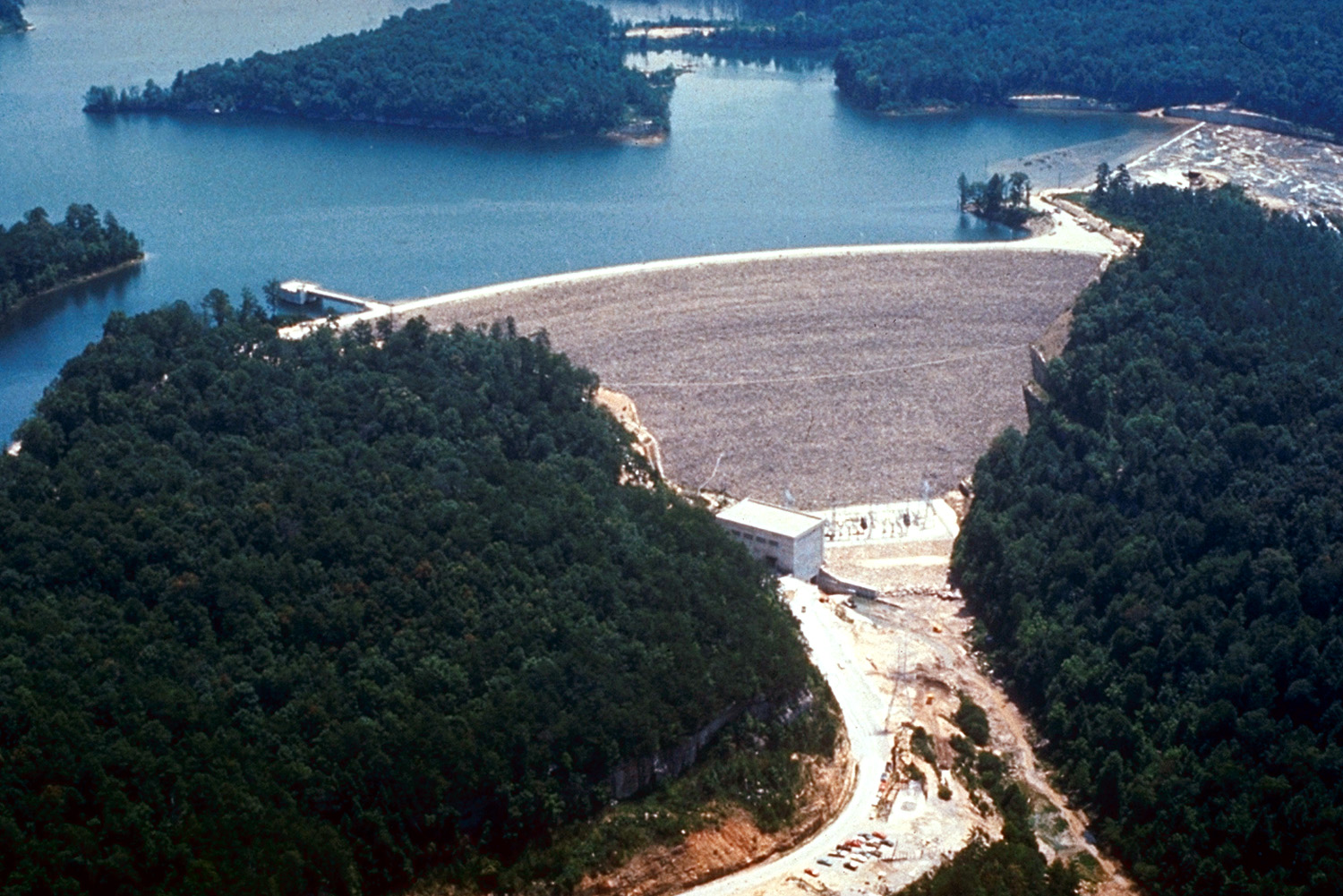
- Laurel River Dam and Lake

- Location within Kentucky
- Location: Laurel / Whitley counties, Kentucky, United States
- Coordinates: 36°57′49″N 84°13′09″W
- Type: Reservoir
- Basin countries: United States
- Max. length: 19 mi (31 km)
- Surface area: 5,600 acres (2,300 ha)
- Average depth: 65 ft (20 m)
- Max. depth: ca. 280 ft (85 m)
- Water volume: 435,000 acre⋅ft (0.537 km^{3})
- Shore length^{1}: 206 mi (332 km)
- Surface elevation: 1,015 ft (309 m)
- ^{1} Shore length is not a well-defined measure.

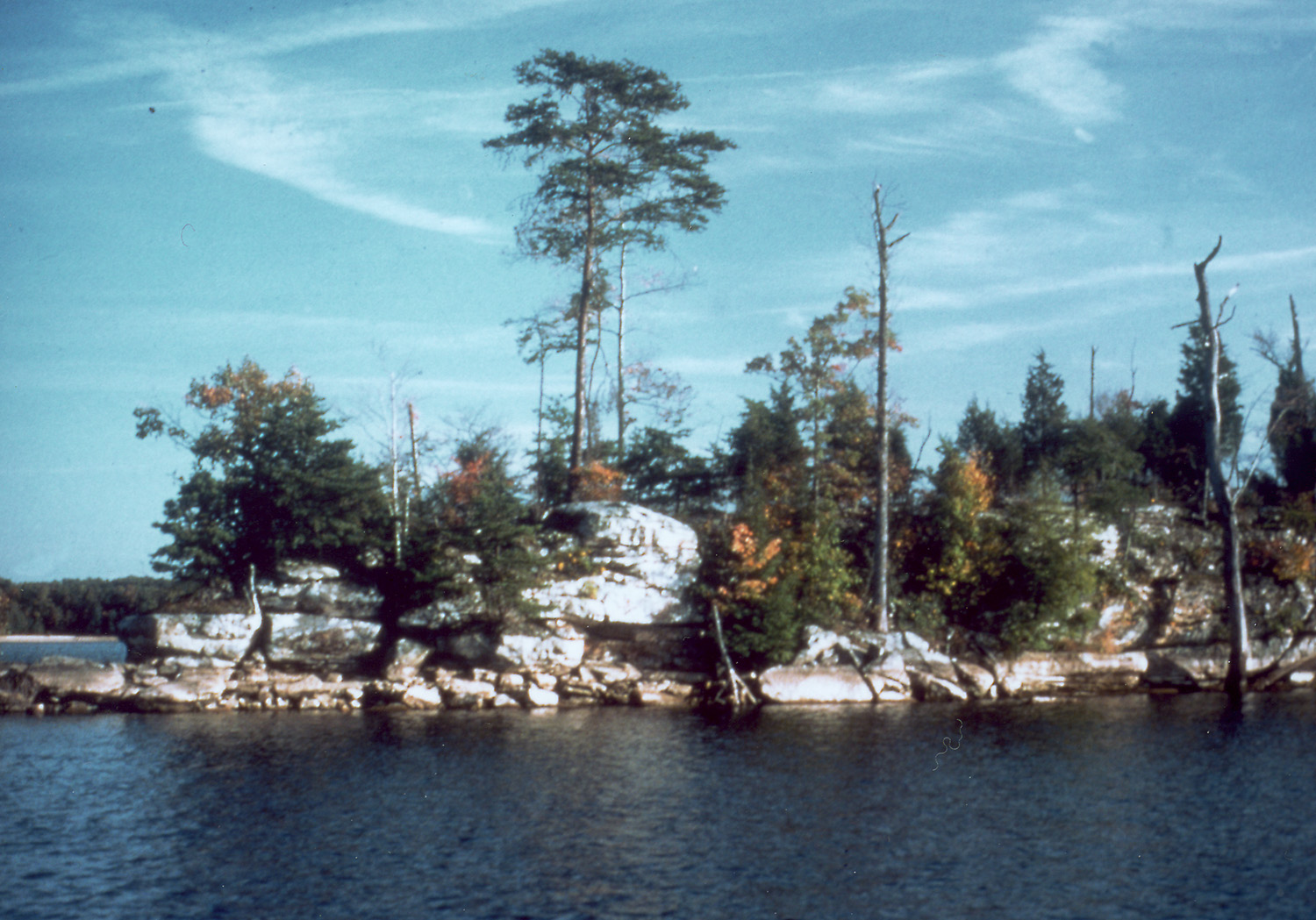
Laurel River Lake, Kentucky

Laurel River Lake, located west of Corbin, Kentucky, in the U.S., is a reservoir built in 1977 by the U.S. Army Corps of Engineers on the Laurel River, a tributary of the Cumberland River, in the Daniel Boone National Forest. The lake covers parts of Laurel and Whitley counties.

The 282 foot (86 m) high dam was built between 1964 and 1974. It is a combination earth and rock-fill dam. Hydropower production began in 1977. As of 2006, it produced an average annual energy of 67 gigawatt hours of hydroelectricity.

The Army Corps of Engineers and the Forest Service cooperate on developing recreational facilities around the reservoir. Today most of the lake is managed by the Forest Service as part of Daniel Boone National Forest. The Army Corps of Engineers manages the operation of the dam itself, and runs recreational facilities at the dam.

Laurel River Lake's drainage area is 282 square miles (730 km^{2}). The area of the lake changes based on how full it is, but it is about 19 miles (31 km) long, with 206 miles (332 km) of shoreline. Its area ranges from about 5,600 to 6,060 acres (22.7 to 24.5 km^{2}), with a maximum flood control size of 6,650 acres (26.9 km^{2}). It has a maximum depth of 85 meters. The reservoir's storage capacity (volume) also changes, but is about 435,000 acre-feet (0.537 km^{3}).
