= McConnell House, Law Office, and Slave Quarters =

- U.S. National Register of Historic Places
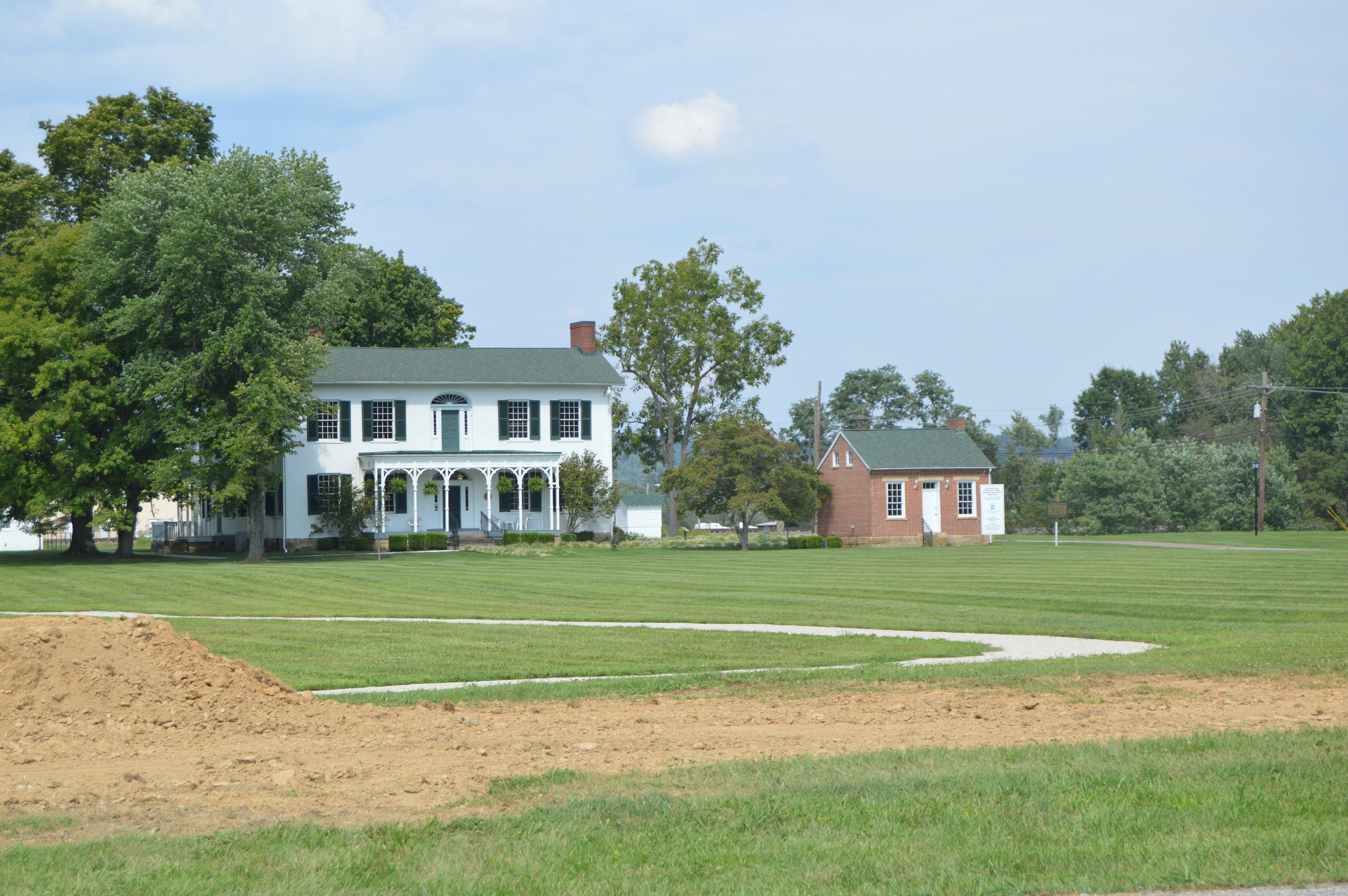

- Location within Kentucky Location within the United States
- Nearest city: Wurtland, Kentucky
- Area: 15 acres (6.1 ha)
- Built: 1833
- Architectural style: Georgian, Federal
- NRHP reference No.: 75000764
- Added to NRHP: July 30, 1975

The McConnell House, Law Office, and Slave Quarters, near Wurtland, Kentucky, United States, was listed on the National Register of Historic Places in 1975. The listing included three contributing buildings and a contributing site on 15 acres (6.1 ha).

It is located west of Wurtland on U.S. Route 23.

It has also been known as Harris House.

It is located on an inlet from the Ohio River.

The listing includes a one-and-a-half-story brick building which originally served as a law office for John McConnell and later as a schoolhouse.

== See also ==
- Henry Clay's Law Office: NRHP listing in Lexington, Kentucky
- William L. Hurst Law Office: NRHP listing in Campton, Kentucky
- National Register of Historic Places listings in Greenup County, Kentucky
