= Eastern Kentucky Coalfield =

Coalfield in Kentucky, United States

Coordinates: 37°45′N 83°05′W

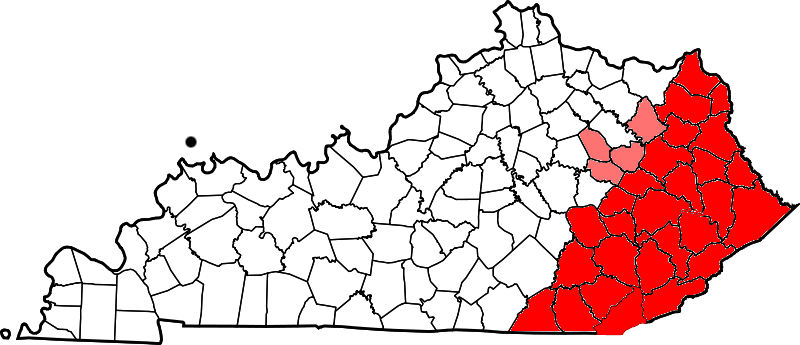
Counties of the Eastern Mountain Coalfields of Kentucky highlighted in red

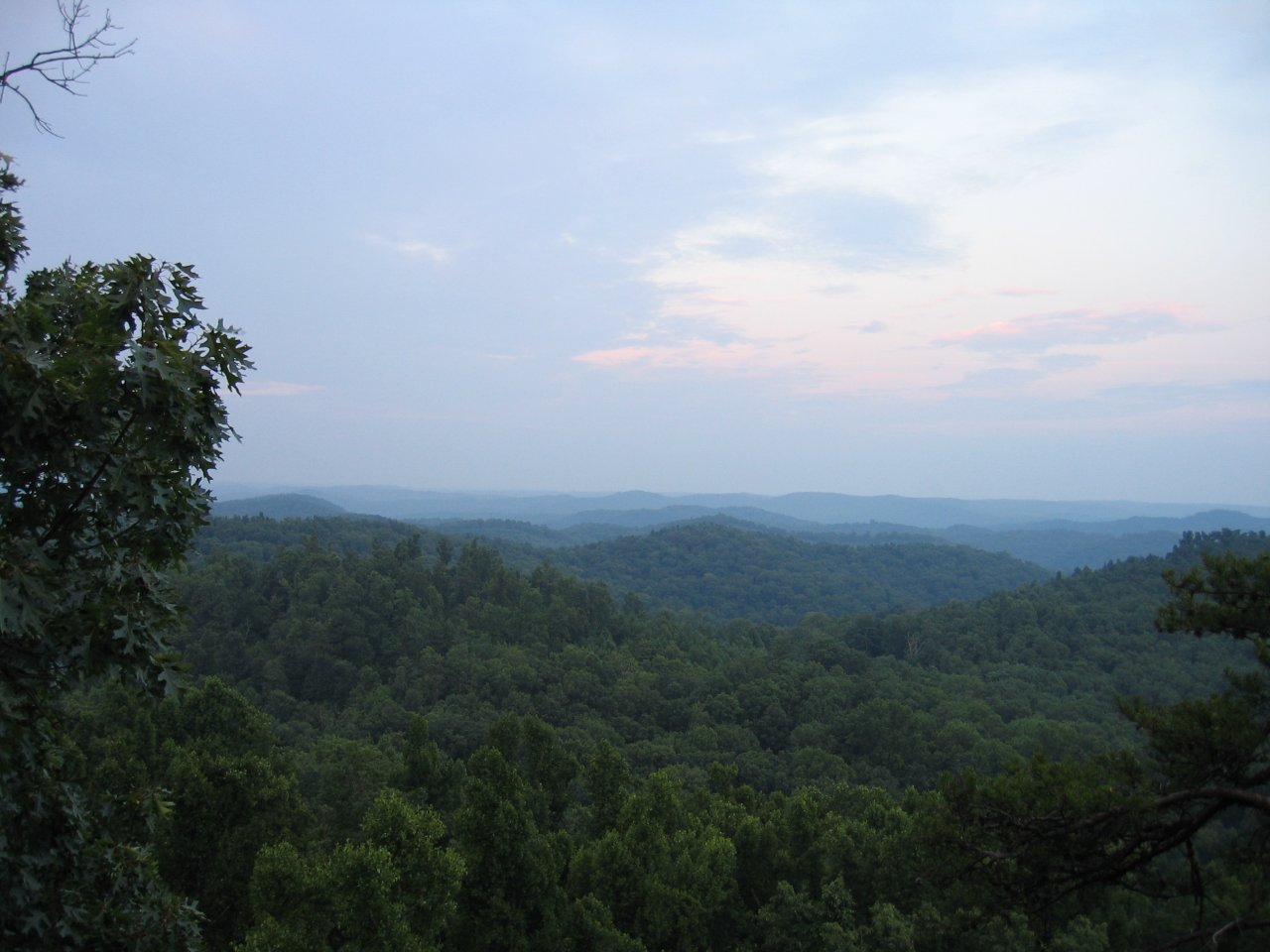
Daniel Boone National Forest in Kentucky

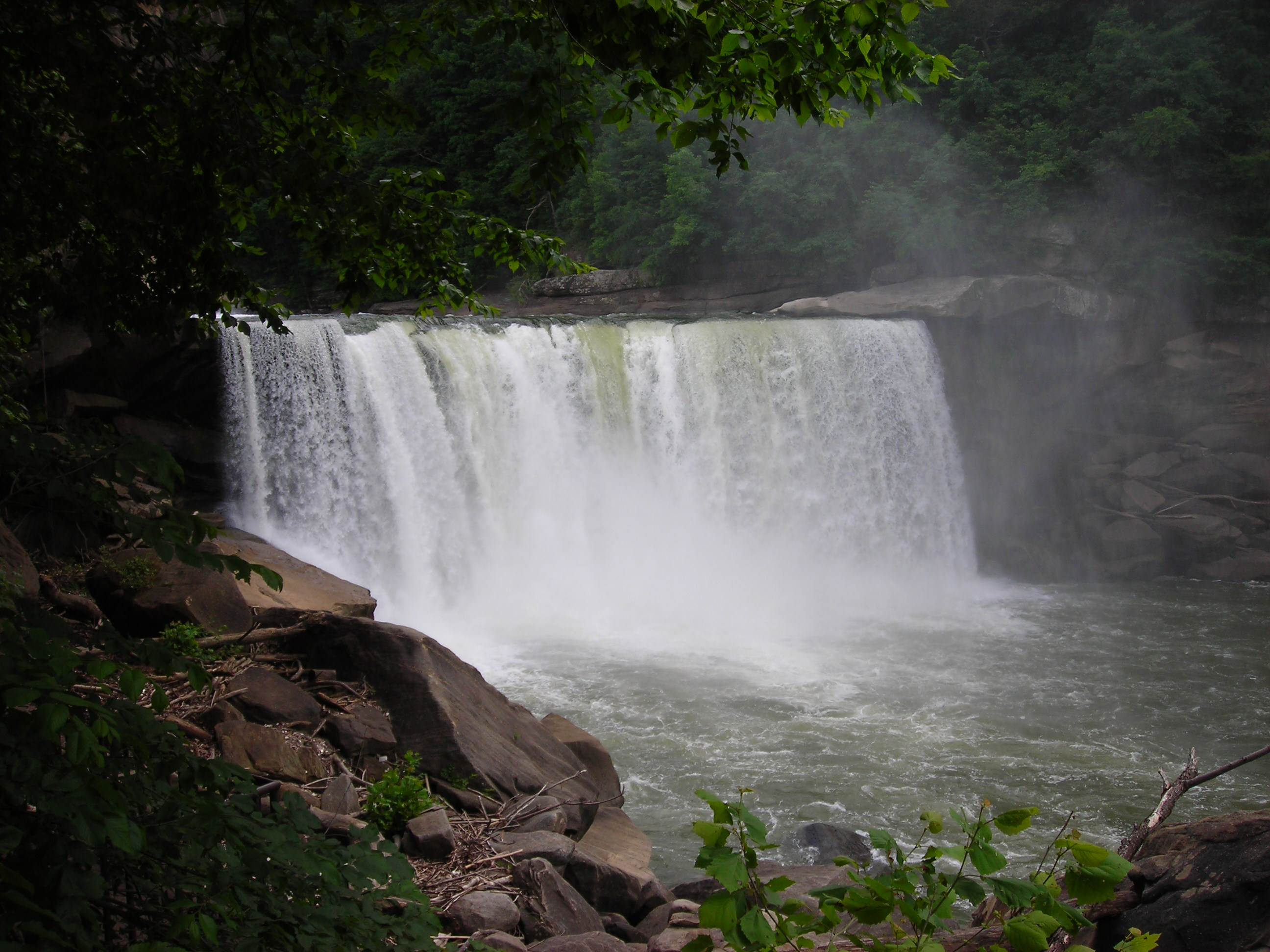
Cumberland Falls in Kentucky

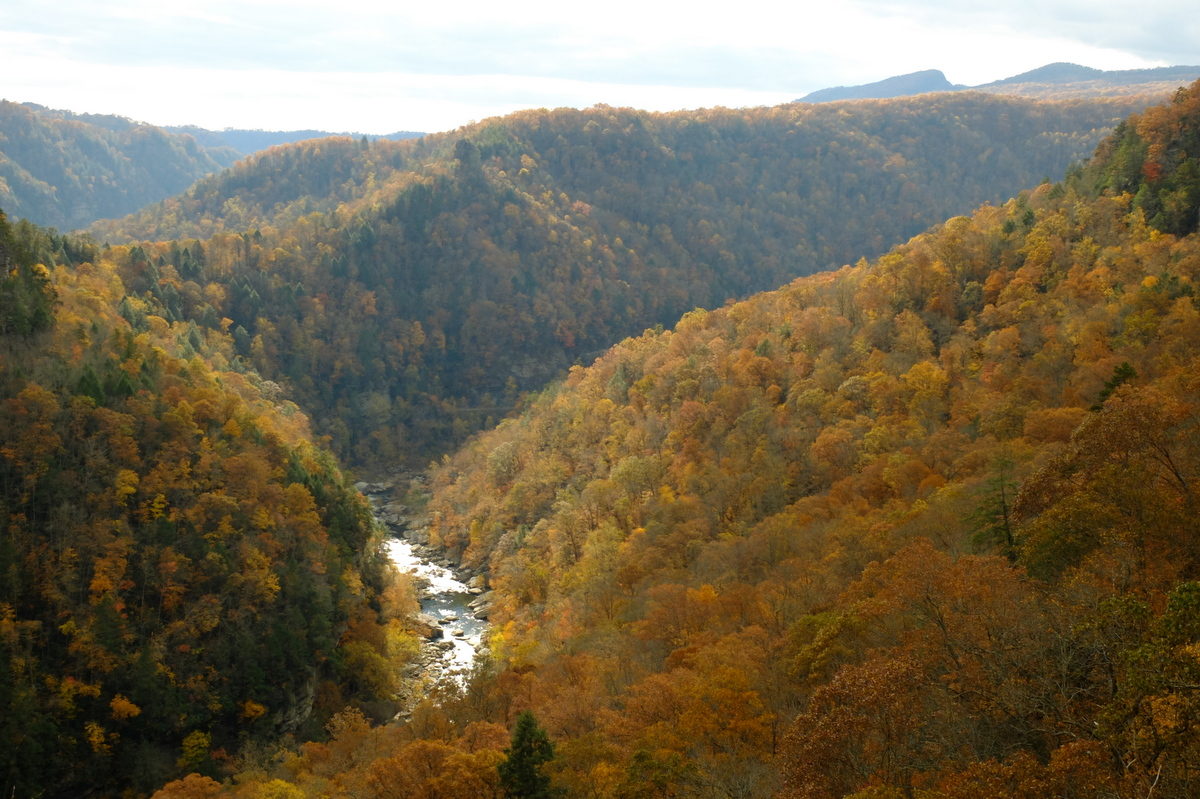
Breaks Interstate Park in Kentucky

The Eastern Kentucky Coalfield is part of the Central Appalachian bituminous coalfield, including all or parts of 30 Kentucky counties and adjoining areas in Ohio, West Virginia, Virginia, and Tennessee. It covers an area from the Allegheny Mountains in the east across the Cumberland Plateau to the Pottsville Escarpment in the west. The region is known for its coal mining; most family farms in the region have disappeared since the introduction of surface mining in the 1940s and 1950s.

The Daniel Boone National Forest is located along the east of the Pottsville Escarpment. The area features many natural arches and sandstone cliffs. The Red River Gorge, part of the National Forest, is known worldwide in rock climbing circles.

The Sheltowee Trace Trail runs 260–270 mi (420–430 km) north and south, through the region.

During the American Civil War most of this region leaned toward the Union due to its makeup at the time of mostly small farmers, but more than 2,000 men from this area formed the 5th. Kentucky Vol. Inf., known as the Army of Eastern Kentucky, under Gen. Humphrey Marshall, C.S.A. During the Great Depression, New Deal programs and the organizing of the United Mine Workers of America made many of the eastern counties Democratic.

Eastern Kentucky has a rich musical heritage. Many nationally acclaimed country music singers and musicians are from the area, including Loretta Lynn, Crystal Gayle, The Judds, Ricky Skaggs, Keith Whitley, Patty Loveless, Dwight Yoakam, Tom T. Hall, Billy Ray Cyrus, Jean Ritchie, Sturgill Simpson, Tyler Childers, Chris Stapleton, and George S. Davis.

As of the 1980s, the only counties in the United States where over half of the population cited "English" as their only ancestry group were in the hills of eastern Kentucky (and made up nearly every county in this region). In the 1980 census, 1,267,079 Kentuckians out of a total population of 2,554,359 cited that they were of English ancestry, making them 49 percent of the state at that time. Large numbers of people of Scottish and Irish ancestry settled the area as well.

== Geography ==
The Eastern Kentucky Coalfield covers 31 counties with a combined land area of 13,370 sq mi (34,628 km^{2}), or about 33.1 percent of the state's land area. Its 2000 census population was 734,194 inhabitants, or about 18.2 percent of the state's population. The largest city, Ashland, has a population of 21,981. Other cities of significance in the region include Pikeville, London, and Middlesboro. The state's highest point, Black Mountain, is located in the southeastern part of the region in Harlan County.

=== Counties ===
County	FIPS code	County seat	Established	Origin	Etymology	Population	Area	Map
Bell County	013	Pineville	1867	Harlan County and Knox County	Joshua Fry Bell, Kentucky legislator (1862–1867)	30,060	361 sq mi (935 km^{2})	State map highlighting Bell County
Boyd County	019	Catlettsburg	1860	Greenup County, Carter County and Lawrence County	Linn Boyd, United States Congressman (1835–1837; 1839–1855) and Lieutenant Governor of Kentucky (1859)	49,752	160 sq mi (414 km^{2})	State map highlighting Boyd County
Breathitt County	025	Jackson	1839	Clay County, Perry County and Estill County	John Breathitt, Governor of Kentucky (1832–1834)	16,100	495 sq mi (1,282 km^{2})	State map highlighting Breathitt County
Carter County	043	Grayson	1838	Greenup County and Lawrence County	William Grayson Carter, Kentucky state senator (1834–1838)	26,889	411 sq mi (1,064 km^{2})	State map highlighting Carter County
Clay County	051	Manchester	1807	Madison County, Floyd County, and Knox County	Green Clay (1757–1828), military general and surveyor	24,556	471 sq mi (1,220 km^{2})	State map highlighting Clay County
Elliott County	063	Sandy Hook	1869	Morgan County, Lawrence County, and Carter County	John Lisle Elliott or John Milton Elliott (1820–1885), legislators	6,748	234 sq mi (606 km^{2})	State map highlighting Elliott County
Floyd County	071	Prestonsburg	1800	Fleming County, Montgomery County, and Mason County	John Floyd (1750–1783), surveyor and pioneer	42,441	394 sq mi (1,020 km^{2})	State map highlighting Floyd County
Greenup County	089	Greenup	1803	Mason County	Christopher Greenup, Governor of Kentucky (1804–1808)	36,891	346 sq mi (896 km^{2})	State map highlighting Greenup County
Harlan County	095	Harlan	1819	Knox County	Silas Harlan (1753–1782), soldier in the Battle of Blue Licks	33,202	467 sq mi (1,210 km^{2})	State map highlighting Harlan County
Jackson County	109	McKee	1858	Madison County, Estill County, Owsley County, Clay County, Laurel County, and Rockcastle County	Andrew Jackson, President of the United States (1829–1837)	13,495	346 sq mi (896 km^{2})	State map highlighting Jackson County
Johnson County	115	Paintsville	1843	Floyd County, Lawrence County, and Morgan County	Richard Mentor Johnson, Vice President of the United States (1837–1841)	23,445	262 sq mi (679 km^{2})	State map highlighting Johnson County
Knott County	119	Hindman	1884	Perry County, Letcher County, Floyd County, and Breathitt County	James Proctor Knott, Governor of Kentucky (1883–1887)	17,649	352 sq mi (912 km^{2})	State map highlighting Knott County
Knox County	121	Barbourville	1799	Lincoln County	Henry Knox, United States Secretary of War (1785–1794)	31,795	388 sq mi (1,005 km^{2})	State map highlighting Knox County
Laurel County	125	London	1825	Rockcastle County, Clay County, Knox County and Whitley County	Mountain laurel trees that are prominent in the area	52,715	436 sq mi (1,129 km^{2})	State map highlighting Laurel County
Lawrence County	127	Louisa	1821	Greenup County and Floyd County	James Lawrence (1781–1813), naval commander during the War of 1812	15,569	419 sq mi (1,085 km^{2})	State map highlighting Lawrence County
Lee County	129	Beattyville	1870	Breathitt County, Estill County, Owsley County, and Wolfe County	Robert E. Lee (1807–1870), Confederate general or Lee County, Virginia	7,916	210 sq mi (544 km^{2})	State map highlighting Lee County
Leslie County	131	Hyden	1878	Clay County, Harlan County and Perry County	Preston Leslie, Governor of Kentucky (1871–1875)	12,401	404 sq mi (1,046 km^{2})	State map highlighting Leslie County
Letcher County	133	Whitesburg	1842	Perry County and Harlan County	Robert P. Letcher, Governor of Kentucky (1840–1844)	25,277	339 sq mi (878 km^{2})	State map highlighting Letcher County
Magoffin County	153	Salyersville	1860	Floyd County, Johnson County and Morgan County	Beriah Magoffin, Governor of Kentucky (1859–1862)	13,332	310 sq mi (803 km^{2})	State map highlighting Magoffin County
Martin County	159	Inez	1870	Floyd County, Johnson County, Pike County, and Lawrence County	John P. Martin, United States Congressman (1845–1847)	12,578	231 sq mi (598 km^{2})	State map highlighting Martin County
McCreary County	147	Whitley City	1912	Pulaski County, Wayne County and Whitley County	James McCreary, Governor of Kentucky (1912–1916)	17,080	428 sq mi (1,109 km^{2})	State map highlighting McCreary County
Morgan County	175	West Liberty	1822	Bath County and Floyd County	Daniel Morgan (1736–1802), Revolutionary War general	13,948	381 sq mi (987 km^{2})	State map highlighting Morgan County
Owsley County	189	Booneville	1843	Breathitt County, Clay County, and Estill County	William Owsley, Governor of Kentucky (1844–1848)	4,858	198 sq mi (513 km^{2})	State map highlighting Owsley County
Perry County	193	Hazard	1820	Floyd County and Clay County	Oliver Hazard Perry (1785–1819), Admiral in the War of 1812	29,390	342 sq mi (886 km^{2})	State map highlighting Perry County
Pike County	195	Pikeville	1821	Floyd County	Zebulon Pike (1779–1813), discoverer of Pike's Peak	68,736	788 sq mi (2,041 km^{2})	State map highlighting Pike County
Whitley County	235	Williamsburg	1818	Knox County	William Whitley (1749–1813), Kentucky pioneer	35,865	440 sq mi (1,140 km^{2})	State map highlighting Whitley County
Wolfe County	237	Campton	1860	Breathitt County, Owsley County, and Powell County	Nathaniel Wolfe (1808–1865), member of the Kentucky General Assembly	7,065	223 sq mi (578 km^{2})	State map highlighting Wolfe County

=== Major cities ===
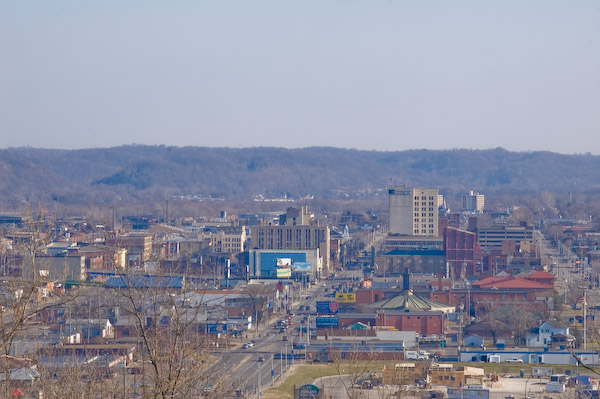
Ashland, the region's largest city

The following list consists of Eastern Kentucky cities with populations over 4,000 according to the 2020 United States Census:

Rank	City	Population in 2020	County
1	Ashland	21,625	Boyd
2	Middlesboro	9,405	Bell
3	Corbin	7,856	Whitley, Knox, and Laurel
4	Pikeville	7,754	Pike
5	London	7,572	Laurel
6	Mount Sterling	7,558	Montgomery
7	Flatwoods	7,325	Greenup
8	Morehead	7,151	Rowan
9	Williamsburg	5,326	Whitley
10	Hazard	5,263	Perry
11	Paintsville	4,312	Johnson

== Protected areas ==
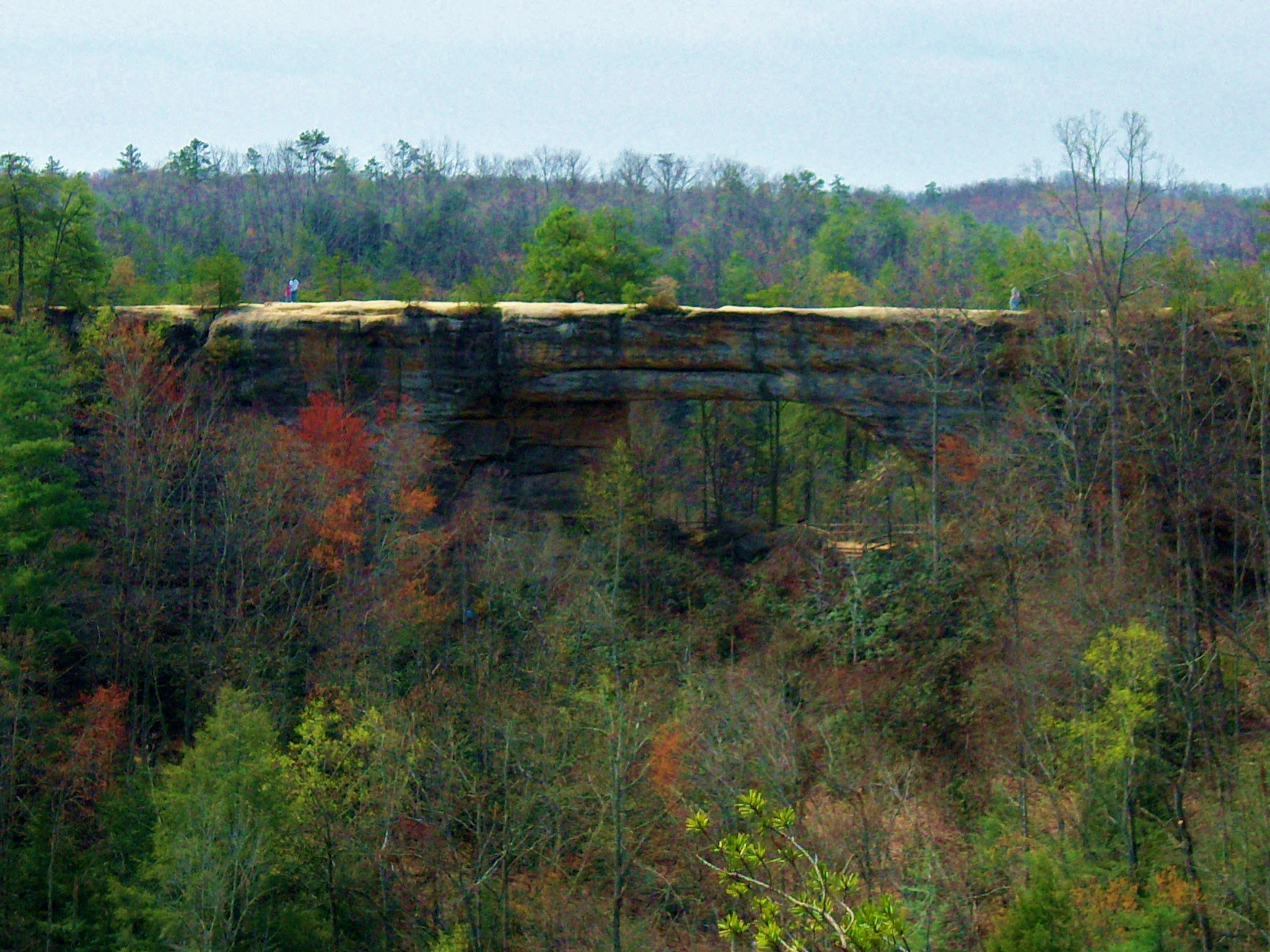
Natural Bridge State Resort Park

=== Historical parks ===
- Cumberland Gap National Historical Park (part)
- Dr. Thomas Walker State Historic Site

=== State resort parks ===
- Buckhorn Lake State Resort Park
- Carter Caves State Resort Park
- Cumberland Falls State Resort Park
- Greenbo Lake State Resort Park
- Jenny Wiley State Resort Park
- Natural Bridge State Resort Park
- Pine Mountain State Resort Park

=== State recreational parks ===
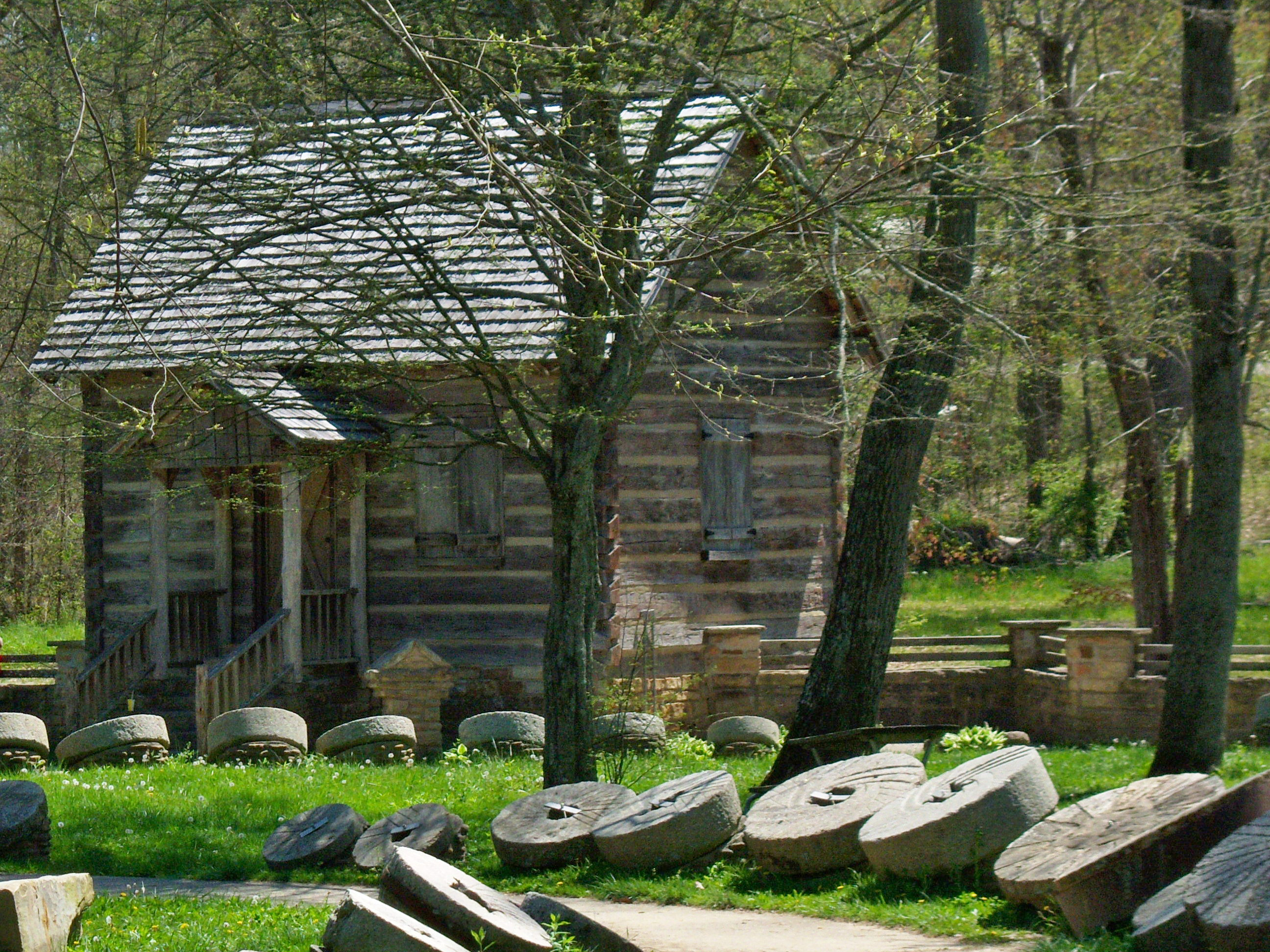
Levi Jackson Wilderness Road State Park in Laurel County, Kentucky

- Carr Creek State Park
- Dawkins Line Rail Trail
- Fishtrap Lake State Park
- Grayson Lake State Park
- Kingdom Come State Park
- Levi Jackson Wilderness Road State Park
- Paintsville Lake State Park
- Pine Mountain State Scenic Trail
- Yatesville Lake State Park

=== Other ===
- Big South Fork National River and Recreation Area (part)
- Breaks Interstate Park (part)

== Economy ==
The region's economy is centered around the natural resources available, which includes coal, timber, natural gas, and oil. Recently, tourism has become a leading industry in the region, due to the region's cultural history and the creation of state parks.

Calgon Carbon constructed the Big Sandy Plant near Ashland in 1961 and it has since become the world's largest producer of granular activated carbon. The facility produces over 100 million pounds of granular activated carbon annually.

=== Persistent poverty ===
Most of the counties in the Eastern Kentucky Coalfield are classified as "persistent poverty counties". The definition of a persistent poverty county by the Economic Research Service of the United States Department of Agriculture is that 20 percent or more of the total county population has been living in poverty since the 1980 census.

A June 2014 article in The New York Times identified six counties in the Kentucky Coal Field as among the "hardest places to live in the United States". The lowest-ranking counties were Breathitt, Clay, Jackson, Lee, Leslie, and Magoffin. They ranked among the bottom ten counties nationwide. The factors which accounted for the low ranking of those six counties were unemployment, prevalence of disabilities, obesity, income, and education. The Times declared Clay County the hardest place to live in the U.S.

=== Appalachian Regional Commission ===
The Appalachian Regional Commission was formed in 1965 to aid economic development in the Appalachian region, which was lagging far behind the rest of the nation on most economic indicators. The Appalachian region currently defined by the Commission includes 420 counties in 13 states, including all counties in Kentucky's Eastern Coalfield. The Commission gives each county one of five possible economic designations—distressed, at-risk, transitional, competitive, or attainment—with "distressed" counties being the most economically endangered and "attainment" counties being the most economically prosperous. These designations are based primarily on three indicators—three-year average unemployment rate, market income per capita, and poverty rate.

From 2012 to 2014, "Appalachian" Kentucky—which includes all of the Eastern Coalfield and several counties in South Central Kentucky and a few in the eastern part of the Bluegrass region—had a three-year average unemployment rate of 9.8%, compared with 7.6% statewide and 7.2% nationwide. In 2014, Appalachian Kentucky had a per capita market income of $18,889, compared with $28,332 statewide and $38,117 nationwide. From 2010 to 2014, Appalachian Kentucky had an average poverty rate of 25.4%—the highest of any of the ARC regions—, compared to 18.9% statewide and 15.6% nationwide. Twenty-five Eastern Mountain Coal Field counties—Bell, Breathitt, Carter, Clay, Elliott, Floyd, Harlan, Jackson, Johnson, Knott, Knox, Lawrence, Lee, Leslie, Letcher, Magoffin, Martin, McCreary, Menifee, Morgan, Owsley, Powell, Rowan, Whitley, and Wolfe—were designated "distressed," while four—Laurel, Montgomery, Perry, and Pike—were designated "at-risk". Two Eastern Coalfield counties were designated "transitional" — Boyd and Greenup. No counties in the Eastern Coalfields region were given the "attainment" designation or were designated "competitive".

The following table illustrates the economic status of each county.

County	Population (2010)	Unemployment Rate (2012–14)	Per Capita Market Income (2014)	Poverty Rate (2010–14)	Status (2017)
Bell	28,691	11.9%	$14,644	32.7%	Distressed
Boyd	49,542	8.6%	$24,337	19.1%	Transitional
Breathitt	13,878	13.7%	$14,386	31.5%	Distressed
Carter	27,720	12.0%	$18,014	18.7%	Distressed
Clay	21,730	13.3%	$11,531	35.7%	Distressed
Elliott	7,852	13.5%	$10,529	39.6%	Distressed
Floyd	39,451	11.7%	$18,473	29.5%	Distressed
Greenup	36,910	9.3%	$23,879	18.0%	Transitional
Harlan	29,278	15.4%	$13,620	32.1%	Distressed
Jackson	13,494	15.4%	$13,496	31.7%	Distressed
Johnson	23,356	10.1%	$19,008	25.3%	Distressed
Knott	16,346	13.5%	$14,271	26.5%	Distressed
Knox	31,883	11.9%	$15,549	33.8%	Distressed
Laurel	58,849	9.2%	$21,051	23.3%	At-Risk
Lawrence	15,860	10.5%	$15,399	23.5%	Distressed
Lee	7,887	11.7%	$11,750	33.4%	Distressed
Leslie	11,310	15.0%	$15,357	23.9%	Distressed
Letcher	24,519	14.2%	$15,955	24.5%	Distressed
Magoffin	13,333	16.3%	$11,139	26.8%	Distressed
Martin	12,929	9.4%	$14,826	33.9%	Distressed
McCreary	18,306	12.4%	$9,763	37.7%	Distressed
Menifee	6,306	11.2%	$15,656	28.8%	Distressed
Montgomery	26,499	8.2%	$23,093	25.2%	At-Risk
Morgan	13,923	10.3%	$13,451	29.7%	Distressed
Owsley	4,755	11.9%	$10,528	39.2%	Distressed
Perry	28,712	12.3%	$20,131	26.6%	Distressed
Pike	68,736	10.6%	$21,285	24.1%	At-Risk
Powell	12,613	10.1%	$18,403	27.5%	Distressed
Rowan	23,333	7.8%	$18,642	26.0%	At-Risk
Whitley	35,637	10.0%	$17,321	24.1%	Distressed
Wolfe	7,355	13.3%	$10,532	44.3%	Distressed

== Health ==
Most of the counties in the Eastern Kentucky Coalfield rank in the lowest ten percent of U.S. counties in average life expectancy. Both men and women have average life spans that are several years less than the average life span in the United States. Moreover, many counties have seen a decline in the life expectancy of men and/or women since 1985. Average life expectancy in some counties is as low as 70 years as compared with the life expectancy of some counties in the U.S. of more than 80 years. Factors influencing the health of residents include a high prevalence of smoking and obesity and a low level of physical activity.

== Post-secondary education ==
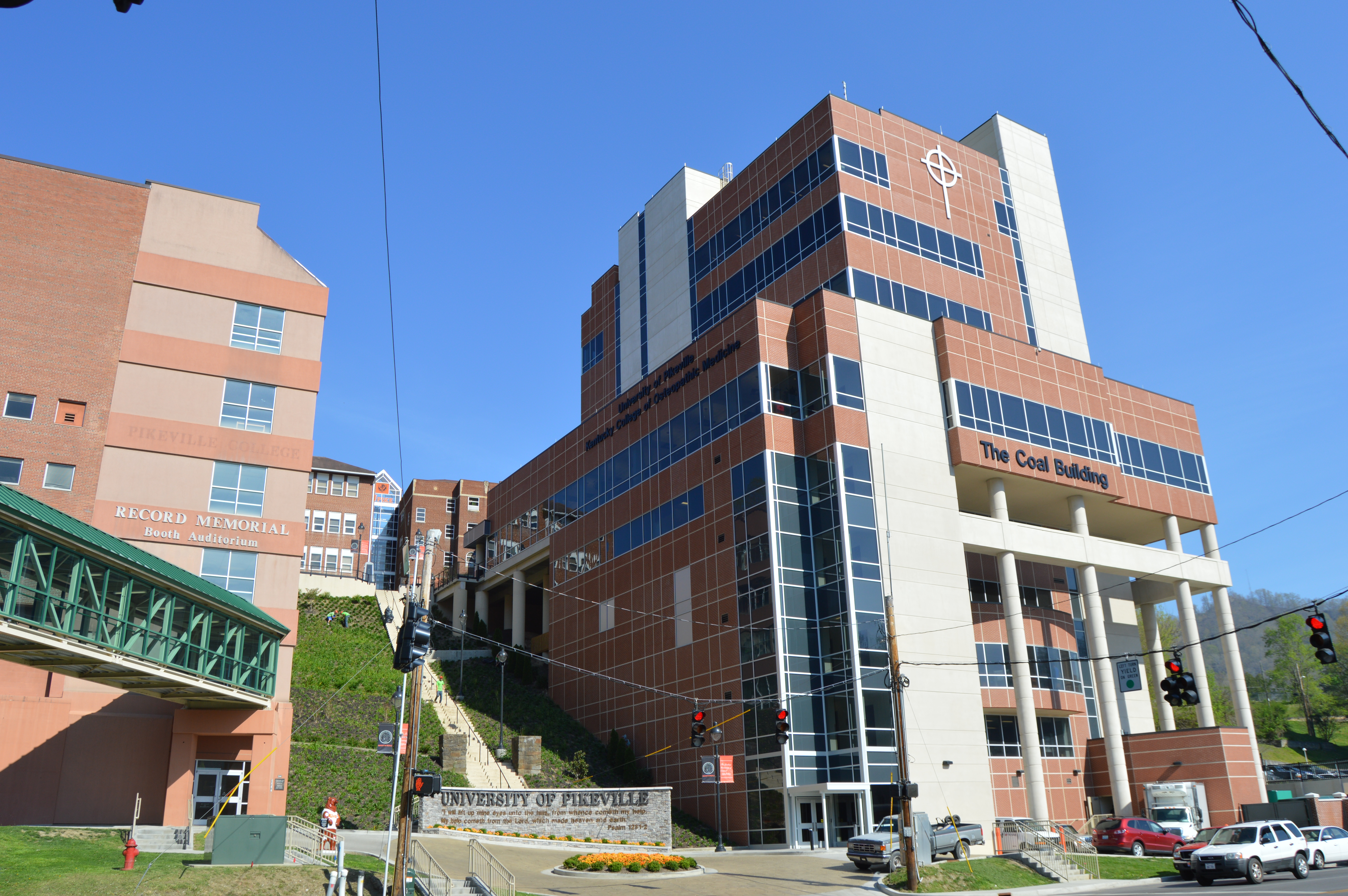
The Coal Building, University of Pikeville Kentucky College of Osteopathic Medicine

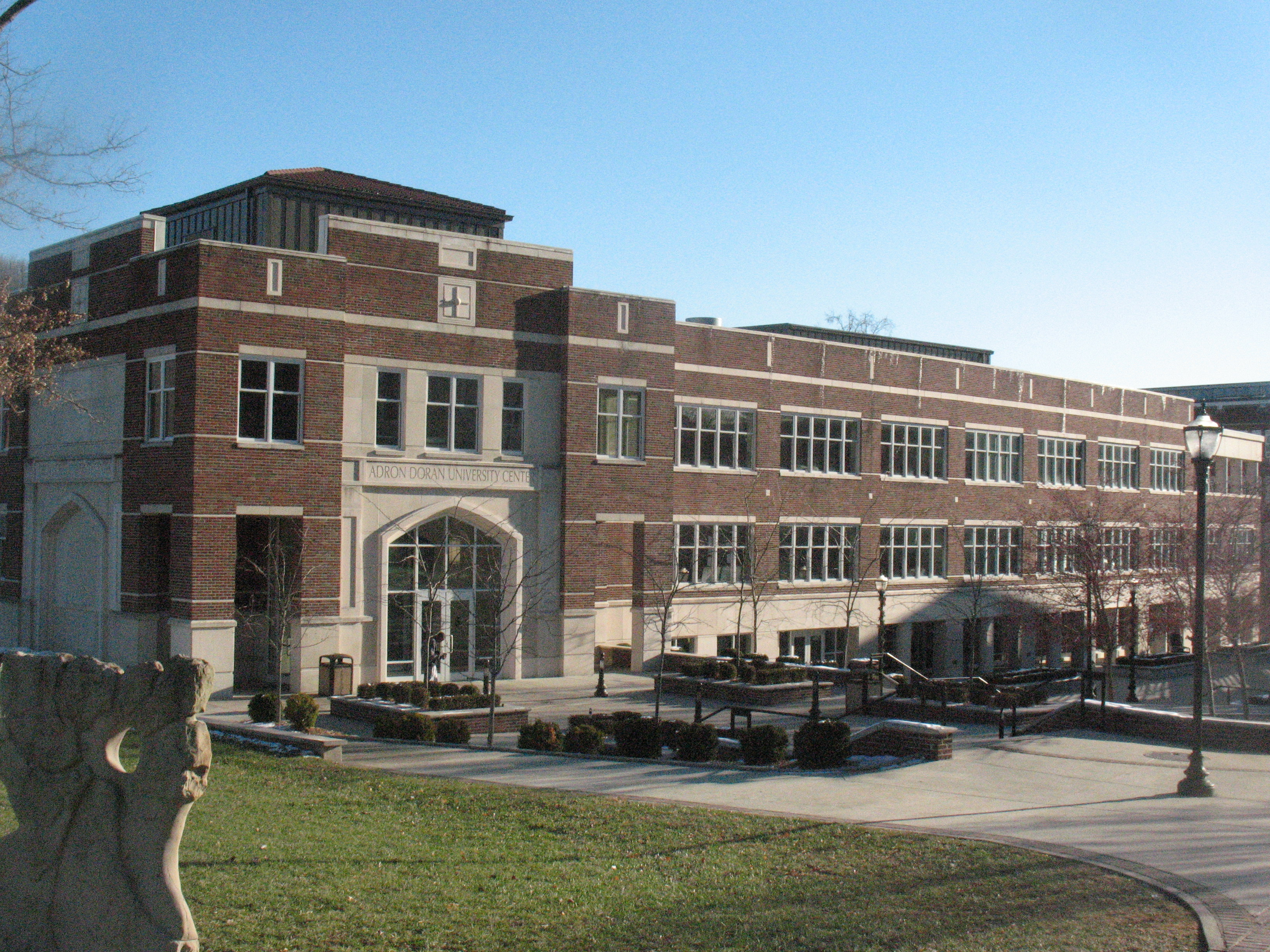
Morehead State University

=== Public universities ===
- Morehead State University

Contrary to what its name suggests, Eastern Kentucky University is actually located outside of the Eastern Coalfield, in the Bluegrass-region city of Richmond.

=== Private colleges and universities ===
- Alice Lloyd College
- Clear Creek Baptist Bible College
- Frontier Nursing University
- Kentucky Christian University
- Kentucky Mountain Bible College
- Union College
- University of Pikeville
- University of the Cumberlands

=== Community and technical colleges ===
- Ashland Community and Technical College
- Big Sandy Community and Technical College
- Hazard Community and Technical College
- Southeast Kentucky Community and Technical College

== Political climate ==
United States presidential election results for Eastern Kentucky Coalfields
Year	Republican		Democratic		Third party(ies)	
Year	No.	%	No.	%	No.	%
2016	197,957	78.45%	46,870	18.57%	7,508	2.98%
2020	213,841	79.19%	53,122	19.67%	3,060	1.13%
2024	211,639	81.47%	44,722	17.22%	3,401	1.31%

As a whole, East Kentucky was long a Democratic stronghold, similar to Central Appalachia as a whole. The only two counties in the state to vote against Mitch McConnell in each of his six senatorial campaigns through 2020 have been Wolfe and Elliott Counties, both in East Kentucky. However, the region has swung dramatically to the right in the 21st century, similar to neighboring West Virginia. In 2004, eleven counties in East Kentucky supported Democratic candidate John Kerry, and in 2008, even as the nation as a whole shifted Democratic, the number of East Kentucky counties supporting Democratic candidate Barack Obama fell to just four, and in 2012 it fell to just one. Every county in East Kentucky supported Donald Trump in both 2016 and 2020 with at least 50% of the vote. In fact, each of the three most Republican counties in Kentucky (in terms of vote proportion) were all in East Kentucky (namely Leslie, Jackson and Martin Counties). Each gave less than a tenth of their vote to Hillary Clinton, the Democratic candidate.

Elliott County, Kentucky, serves as a good representation of the political transformation throughout the region. The county had the longest streak in the nation of any county voting Democratic, but has shifted hard to the right in recent elections. The county went from giving Democrat Barack Obama more than 60% of the vote in 2008 to giving Republican Donald Trump more than 70% of the vote just eight years later. Despite this, Democrats continue to do well in local elections, and the party maintains an overwhelming advantage in party registration. Much of this area is represented by Kentucky's 5th congressional district represented by 22-term congressman Hal Rogers, who also serves as the Dean of the United States House of Representatives.

== Notable people ==
- Hylo Brown, bluegrass and country music singer, born in River.
- June Buchanan (1887–1988), educator who worked with Alice Spencer Geddes Lloyd (see below). Co-founder of Caney Junior College, now Alice Lloyd College. Lived in Knott County from 1919 until her death.
- Abraham Childers (1750–1849), Continental Army soldier and politician
- Tyler Childers, a country, bluegrass, and folk musician from Paintsville, Kentucky.
- Earle Combs (1899–1976), Hall of Fame MLB center fielder for the New York Yankees. Born in Pebworth, a community in Owsley County.
- Tim Couch, former NFL quarterback. Born and raised in Hyden.
- Billy Ray Cyrus (born 1961), American country music singer, songwriter and actor. Born in Flatwoods.
- Richie Farmer (born 1969), basketball standout for the University of Kentucky and politician (Kentucky Commissioner of Agriculture, 2003–2011). Born and raised in Manchester.
- Jim Ford, singer-songwriter, born in Johnson County.
- Mary Elliott Flanery, first woman elected to a state legislature south of the Mason–Dixon line.
- Crystal Gayle, country singer and younger sister of Loretta Lynn; both raised in Van Lear.
- Eula Hall, founder of the Mud Creek Clinic.
- Roscoe Holcomb, American musician who lived the majority of his life in Daisy.
- Silas House (born 1971), author. Born and raised in Laurel County; also lived in Leslie County during his childhood.
- The Judds, a country music duo of mother Naomi (born 1946) and daughter Wynonna (born 1964). Born in Ashland.
- Ashley Judd (born 1968), actress; daughter of Naomi Judd and half-sister of Wynonna Judd. Born in Ashland.
- Alice Spencer Geddes Lloyd (1876–1962), social reformer who founded 100 elementary schools in the region as well as co-founding the college that now bears her name. Lived in Knott County from 1915 until her death.
- Patty Loveless, country music singer. Born in Pikeville.
- Loretta Lynn, country singer, raised in Van Lear.
- John Pelphrey (born 1968), basketball standout for the University of Kentucky (and teammate of Farmer); former head basketball coach at the University of Arkansas, and current assistant at the University of Florida. Born in Paintsville.
- Francis Gary Powers (August 17, 1929 – August 1, 1977) was an American pilot whose CIA U-2 spy plane was shot down while over the Soviet Union, causing the 1960 U-2 incident. Born in Jenkins.
- Venus Ramey, Miss America, 1944. Born in Ashland.
- Jeff Sheppard (born 1974), University of Kentucky basketball star (1998 NCAA Tournament Most Outstanding Player) and former player in the NBA and several European leagues. Has lived in London since he retired from play.
- Sturgill Simpson, outlaw country music singer-songwriter born in Jackson in 1978
- Benjamin F. Stapleton (1869–1950), Mayor of Denver, Colorado from 1923 to 1931 and 1935 to 1947). Born in Paintsville.
- Gary Stewart, Country music singer and musician, 1944–2003, born in Jenkins.
- Jesse Stuart, author and former poet laureate of Kentucky
- JD Vance (born 1984), 50th vice president of the United States. Raised primarily in Breathitt County.
- Dwight Yoakam (born 1956), singer-songwriter, actor and film director. Born in Pikeville.

== See also ==
- Culture of Eastern Kentucky
- Coal mining in Kentucky
- Huntington-Ashland-Ironton metropolitan area
