= National Register of Historic Places listings in Wolfe County, Kentucky =

Location of Wolfe County in Kentucky

This is a list of the National Register of Historic Places listings in Wolfe County, Kentucky.

It is intended to be a complete list of the properties on the National Register of Historic Places in Wolfe County, Kentucky, United States. The locations of National Register properties for which the latitude and longitude coordinates are included below, may be seen in a map.

There are 4 properties listed on the National Register in the county.

This National Park Service list is complete through NPS recent listings posted June 13, 2025.

== Current listings ==
	Name on the Register	Image	Date listed	Location	City or town	Description
1	Hazel Green Academy Historic Buildings		July 18, 1979 (#79001047)	Kentucky Route 191; 37°47′42″N 83°24′46″W	Hazel Green	
2	William L. Hurst Law Office	William L. Hurst Law Office	August 26, 1993 (#93000697)	N. Washington St. 37°44′05″N 83°32′52″W	Campton	
3	Red River Gorge District		September 12, 2003 (#03000919)	Includes the confluence of Gladie Creek with the Red River; 37°50′12″N 83°36′44″W	Daniel Boone National Forest	A large area in the national forest with extensive archaeological resources, having 442 contributing sites including numerous rock shelters. Extends also into Menifee County and Powell County.
4	Trinity Rockhouses		August 14, 1975 (#75000841)	Address Restricted	Slade	
5	Wolfe County High School		June 20, 2013 (#13000477)	166 Wolfe County Elementary School Road; 37°44′03″N 83°33′05″W	Campton	

== See also ==
- List of National Historic Landmarks in Kentucky
- National Register of Historic Places listings in Kentucky
