= William L. Hurst Law Office =

- U.S. National Register of Historic Places
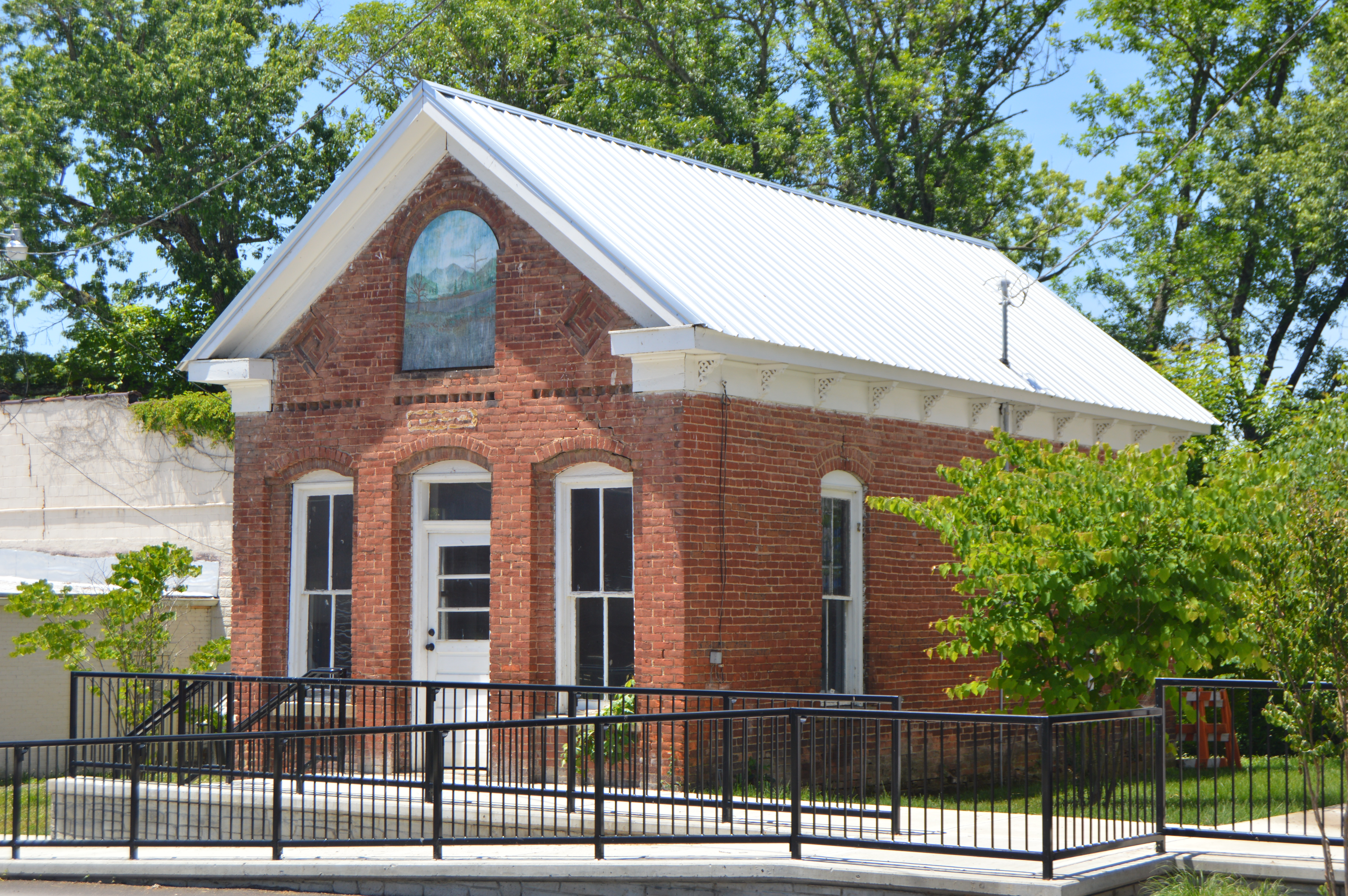

- Location within Kentucky Location within the United States
- Location: N. Washington St., Campton, Kentucky
- Coordinates: 37°44′05″N 83°32′52″W
- Area: less than one acre
- Built: c.1887
- Architectural style: Italianate
- NRHP reference No.: 93000697
- Added to NRHP: August 26, 1993

The William L. Hurst Law Office, on N. Washington Street in Campton, Kentucky, is a historic brick building built around 1887. It was listed on the National Register of Historic Places in 1993.

It includes elements of Italianate and also of Classical Revival architecture.

It was used as law offices by William L. Hurst, a Union veteran of the Civil War, who moved to the area in the 1870s and practiced law into the 1900s. Hurst rented the building to the city of Campton for use as a sheriff and clerk's office during 1914–1917.

== See also ==
- Henry Clay's Law Office: NRHP listing in Lexington, Kentucky
- McConnell House, Law Office, and Slave Quarters: NRHP listing in Greenup County, Kentucky
- National Register of Historic Places listings in Wolfe County, Kentucky
