= Swift's silver mine =

Mine in the United States of America

Swift's silver mine is an alleged silver mine whose existence is part of the folklore of the Appalachian Mountains. The mine was supposedly discovered in 1760 by an Englishman named Jonathan Swift. The uncertainty of its location is part of the folklore of its existence, with locations ascribed to eastern Kentucky, southwest Virginia or eastern Tennessee.

== Legend ==
The legend of Swift's silver mine is based on accounts given in the journal of an Englishman named Jonathan Swift. Swift claimed to have preceded Daniel Boone into Kentucky, coming to the region in 1760 on a series of mining expeditions. The journal recounts how a wounded bear led Swift to a vein of silver ore in a cave, and how that for the next nine years, he made annual treks back to the site of the mine, carrying out "silver bars and minted coins." An article in an 1886 edition of Harper's Magazine tells how Swift supposedly buried a good deal of the treasure at various locations:

John Swift said he made silver in large quantities, burying some thirty thousand dollars and crowns on a large creek; fifteen thousand dollars a little way off, near some trees, which were duly marked; a prize of six thousand dollars close by the fork of a white oak; and three thousand dollars in the rocks of a rock house: all which, in the light of these notes, it is allowed any one who will to hunt for.

Later, amid numerous obstacles that included Indian attacks, and a mutiny by his crew, Swift walled up the cave and discontinued his mining operation. He left his journal in the possession of a Mrs. Renfro, the widow of one Joseph Renfro of Bean's Station, Tennessee, in whom he was purported to have a romantic interest. Before Swift could return to the mine, he was stricken blind and was unable to locate it again.

=== Variations ===
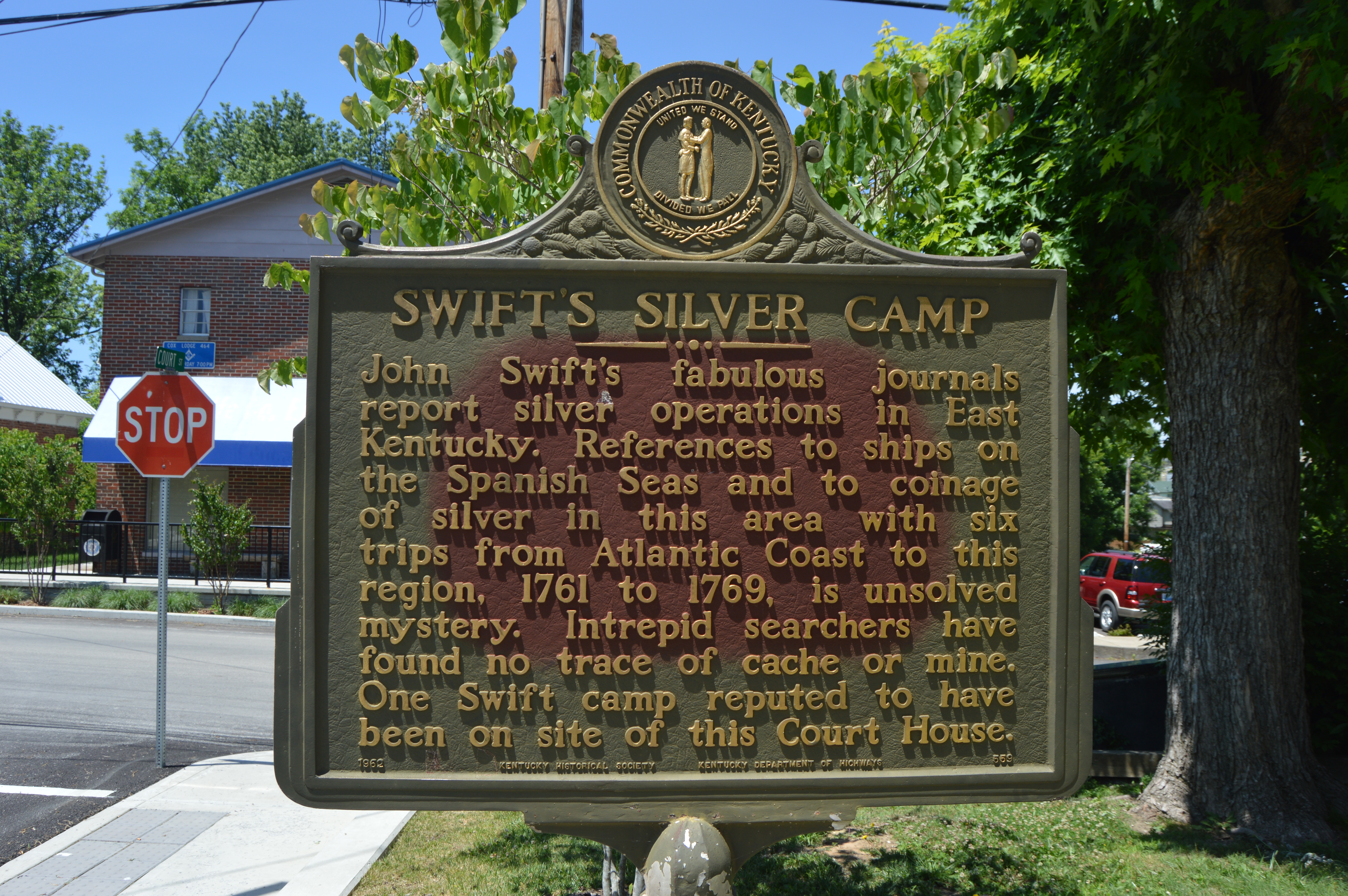
Historical marker in Campton, Kentucky, reputed to be one of Swift's campsites

Settlers in Wise County, Virginia, believed that the mine was located on or around Stone Mountain, and that local Indians knew the location of the mine. According to the settlers, an Indian chief named Benge once said that "if the pale face knew what he knew they could shoe their horses cheaper with silver than with iron." They maintain that a captured settler named Hans G. Frenchman was taken to the mine by the Indians. He marked its location, and later escaped his captors and revealed the location of the mine to Swift. In this version of the story, Swift and Frenchman took only enough silver to buy two horses, and on a return trip, were unable to locate the mine.

Another variation along these lines holds that Swift was taken to the mine by a Frenchman named "Monday" or "Monde". In this version, Swift and Monde are driven from the mine by an Indian attack, and Swift kills Monde for fear that he will reveal the location of the mine to others. Later, when Swift attempts to return to the mine, Monde's hand covers the compass so he cannot tell which direction to proceed.

Solomon Mullins, or "Money-making Sol" (born 1782, died 1858) was rumored to have discovered Swift's mines near Pine Mountain in Southwest Virginia. Solomon lived in what was then known as Holly Creek, but is now Clintwood, Virginia. Solomon melted the silver down and used one of his slaves to "strike" for him (striking: the head of a hammer is heated until it is a plastic state and struck over a good coin. The coin, being harder than the softened head of the hammer is, therefore, imprinted. The hammer is then allowed to cool thus producing the die). To finish the process, or to imprint the counterfeit coins with official markings, Sol and his slave would relocate to the privacy afforded by caves located on cliffs adjacent Sol's farm. To this day, the cliffs are known as "Sol's Cliffs".

According to local legend, Solomon's "counterfeit" money used more silver, and was worth more, than the official currency at the time. Apparently, Sol mixed the pure silver with other lesser metals to make his money. Solomon never disclosed where he obtained the pure silver, but many people speculated that he found the silver in one of the many caves on Pine Mountain close to his farm.

Once, Solomon was caught by a U.S. detective while at work in the cliffs. Reportedly, realizing his predicament, he ordered the man to help with his work, saying "Grab a hammer and strike this." He hoped the action, if taken, would make the detective complicit; regardless of the story's veracity, it did not do Sol any good. In early 1837, Solomon and two of his 10 children, Peter and Spencer, were brought to trial and were charged with making counterfeit coins. Solomon was found guilty, but fled Virginia before being sentenced. He reportedly died in 1858 and never revealed the location of his source of silver.

Each year in Wolfe County, Kentucky, there is a Swift Silver mine festival in the county seat of Campton, where locals believe the mine may be located near Swift Creek.

== Expeditions ==
John Filson is the first person known to have referenced the mine following Swift's death. In 1788, Filson claimed a tract of land supposed to have included a silver mine worked by "a certain man named Swift." Filson disappeared, taking with him any knowledge he may have had as to the mine's location.

Kentucky pioneer James Harrod may also have believed in Swift's silver mine. According to Harrod's wife, a man named Bridges said he had found the mine, and asked Harrod for his help in developing it. Despite the fact that Harrod and Bridges had a dispute over land some years previous, these two and another man entered the wilderness of Kentucky in 1792, purportedly in search of the mine. Harrod did not return from the trip, and although his body was never found, his wife maintained that Bridges had used the story of the mine to lure him into the woods to murder him.

When Judge John Haywood was working on a history of the area around Clear Creek in Kentucky, he observed two "ancient" furnaces that he believed may have been used by Swift.

In 1854, Professor David Dale Owen was dispatched to Bell County, Kentucky, as part of a geological survey of the state. As part of the survey, Owen examined a location reputed by the locals to be the site of Swift's silver mine. Guided by an explorer named Benjamin Herndon, Owen examined the area and found that it contained "some accidental minerals sparingly disseminated, such as sulphuret of zinc and lead – which proved on examination to be hydrated silicate of alumina." Owen's survey did not find any significant deposits of silver ore in the area.

== Skepticism ==
Geological evidence casts doubt on the existence of Swift's silver mine. In two centuries, subsequent mining and excavation of the area said to have contained the mine have not yielded a single vein of silver ore.

=== Regarding the journal ===
Skeptical writer Joe Nickell pointed out that there are numerous versions of the journal upon which the legend of Swift's Silver Mine is based. The best known and most complete of these contains portions plagiarized from a history of Kentucky dating later than the supposed time frame of the journal itself. Because this version is filled with references to Freemasonry and moral allusions, some historians dismiss the entire tale as an allegory.

=== Regarding Swift ===
There is the question of Swift himself. No proof exists that there ever was a John or Jonathan Swift who mined silver in Kentucky. (James Dougherty gives alternative first names of "George", "William", and "Tom".) The man many considered to be the Jonathan Swift of legend is known to have been alive many years after the purported death of the fabled miner. Nothing is known of this man's ancestry, and what little is known about him personally has been handed down through tradition. If the birth date given in Swift's journal is to be believed, the known Swift would have been an incredible 112 years old at the time of his death.

If there was an actual Jonathan Swift, there is some disagreement as to his character. Tradition holds that he was an established Indian trader, but some historians came to believe he was a pirate who preyed on Spanish merchants and made his frequent trips into the wilderness not to retrieve his treasure, but to hide and coin it. A resident of Laurel County, Kentucky, named William Reams held that following Swift's visit to the mine in 1769 – the last trip recorded in the journal – he and his accomplices agreed not to claim any of the treasure they had hidden in the area until 1790. When they did return, Swift was overcome by the sight of the wealth and killed the other members of the party while they slept. Following this action, he was struck blind and unable to recover the treasure.

Nickell contends that the pirate theory raises more questions than it answers. He contends that a journey into Kentucky was a dangerous undertaking, and that Swift could just as easily set up a clandestine coining operation in the backwoods of Virginia or aboard his ship. He also questions why Swift would take the time to produce such a detailed journal to cover his story.

== See also ==
- Lost mines
