= Baptist, Wolfe County, Kentucky =

Unincorporated community in Kentucky, United States

Baptist, Kentucky
- Unincorporated community
- Location within Kentucky Location within the United States
- Coordinates: 37°43′54″N 83°28′46″W
- Country: United States
- State: Kentucky
- County: Wolfe
- Elevation: 932 ft (284 m)
- Time zone: UTC-5 (Eastern (EST))
  - Summer (DST): UTC-4 (EDT)
- GNIS feature ID: 507451

Baptist is an unincorporated community in Wolfe County, Kentucky, United States.

== History ==
The community was settled in the early nineteenth century and the Stillwater Baptist Church, from which the name was taken, was organized in 1837. The Baptist post office opened in 1917 and closed in 1974.
