= Torrent Falls =

Outdoor area in Kentucky, USA

Coordinates: 37.7201°N 83.6607°W

Torrent Falls is an outdoor residential property near the small community of Torrent, Kentucky, USA, which is near Natural Bridge State Park, Red River Gorge and Daniel Boone National Forest in Kentucky. At one time, a health and vacation resort for the wealthy, it has a waterfall, and both traditional climbing and sport climbing route for rock climbers, and a loop-trail for hiking, and cabins available for vacation rentals on this private property. Torrent Falls is located on Kentucky Route 11 south of Natural Bridge State Park in Wolfe County.
