= John Henry Hammond House =

Historic house in Manhattan, New York

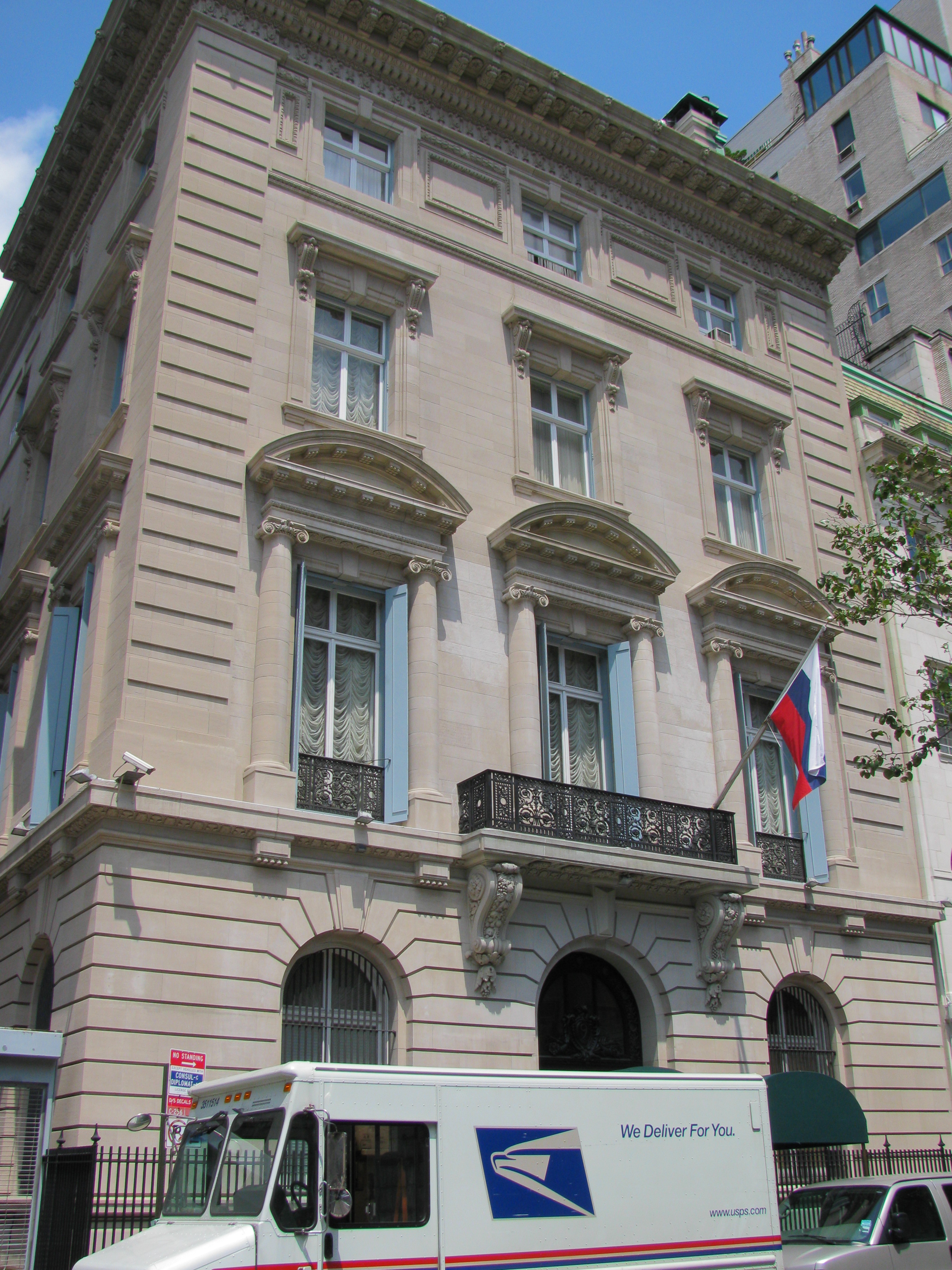
- Front of the building (2009)
- Alternative names: Hammond House

General information
- Architectural style: Italian Renaissance style
- Location: 9 East 91st Street, Manhattan, New York, United States
- Coordinates: 40°47′04″N 73°57′25″W
- Construction started: c. 1902
- Completed: c. 1906
- Owner: Government of Russia

Technical details
- Floor count: 5

Design and construction
- Architect: Carrère and Hastings

New York City Landmark
- Designated: July 24, 1974
- Reference no.: 0677
- Designated entity: Exterior

The John Henry Hammond House is a mansion at 9 East 91st Street in the Carnegie Hill section of the Upper East Side of Manhattan in New York City, New York, US. Designed by architects Carrère and Hastings in the Italian Renaissance style, it was completed by 1906 as the residence of lawyer John Henry Hammond and his wife Emily Vanderbilt Sloane Hammond. The Russian Federation owns the house and has used it as the Consulate General of Russia to New York City since 1994. The mansion is a New York City designated landmark.

The Hammond House is five stories high, with its fifth story set back from the facade. The mansion's limestone facade is rusticated on its lowest two stories, and each corner of the building has vertical stone quoins. The second story of the facade is designed like a piano nobile, while the upper stories have progressively smaller windows. The rooms were designed in the Louis XVI style, with features such as elevators and a squash court. When the house was built, the ground (or first) floor had a "T"-shaped entrance hall, a billiards room, a dining room, and a breakfast room. The reception rooms on the second floor—which included a ballroom, library, and music room—could accommodate hundreds of guests. The third and fourth floors were used as bedrooms. There is also an attic, which originally contained female servants' quarters and an infirmary, and a basement, with male servants' quarters.

Andrew Carnegie purchased the site in 1898 to protect the value of his nearby mansion. William D. Sloane, of the W. & J. Sloane furniture family, acquired the site from Carnegie in 1901 and commissioned the Hammond House and the adjacent James A. Burden House for his daughters. The house served as the Hammond family's home from 1905 to 1946, when the eye surgeon Ramón Castroviejo bought the house and slightly modified the interior. He used the house as his office and residence while operating an eye hospital on the top floors. The Soviet government bought the house in 1975 and renovated it, but the consulate's opening was delayed due to an agreement with the U.S. After the U.S. expelled Soviet diplomats in 1980, the house was abandoned and fell into disrepair. It was renovated from 1992 to 1994, allowing it to serve as the Russian consulate to New York City.

== Site ==
The John Henry Hammond House is located at 9 East 91st Street, in the Carnegie Hill section of the Upper East Side of Manhattan in New York City, New York, US. It stands on the north side of 91st Street, just east of Fifth Avenue. The site has a frontage of 57.17 feet (17.43 m) on 91st Street and extends 100 feet (30 m) northward. On the same city block to the west are the Otto H. Kahn House and the James A. Burden House, while directly to the east is the John and Caroline Trevor House. The Felix M. Warburg House, containing the Jewish Museum, is on the block to the north. Just south of the John Henry Hammond House is the Andrew Carnegie Mansion at 2 East 90th Street, housing the Cooper Hewitt, Smithsonian Design Museum. The townhouses on 11, 15, and 17 East 90th Street and the Spence School are located on the same block as the Carnegie Mansion, southeast of the Hammond House.

Facing the Burden House to the west is a courtyard, which was originally enclosed behind heavy doors. The courtyard occupies the 35-foot (11 m) gap between the Hammond and Burden houses. Ever since the government of the Soviet Union took over the Hammond House in the 1970s, the courtyard has served as a parking lot, which is closed off by a rolldown gate.

== Architecture ==
The mansion was designed by Carrère and Hastings, who were also responsible for the design of the New York Public Library Main Branch. It is designed in a High Renaissance style with elements influenced by 16th-century Italian buildings.

=== Facade ===
The Hammond House is five stories high, with its fifth story set back from the facade. In general, the window openings contain casement windows with wooden frames, which date back to the house's construction in 1903. The first story's facade is made of rusticated blocks of limestone. At the center of the facade's southern elevation is a round arch with a pair of wrought-iron entrance doors. On either side of the entrance are large console brackets, which contain leaf and fruit motifs. The brackets support a balcony on the second story, thus giving the balcony the appearance of a deep cornice. There are round-arched window openings on either side of the entrance.

The second through fourth stories feature quoins at each corner of the building. The second story of the facade is designed like a piano nobile, with three vertical bays of high French windows, each flanked by columns in the Ionic order. Above each pair of columns are entablatures, which support segmentally arched pediments; the columns and pediments give the windows the appearance of aediculae, or Roman temples. Both of the outer second-story windows are recessed from the facade, and there were formerly wrought-iron window guards in front of each of these windows, with leaf and fruit motifs. By the 1990s, the window guards in front of the outer windows had been removed. There is also a balcony in front of the central window, with wrought-iron balustrade.

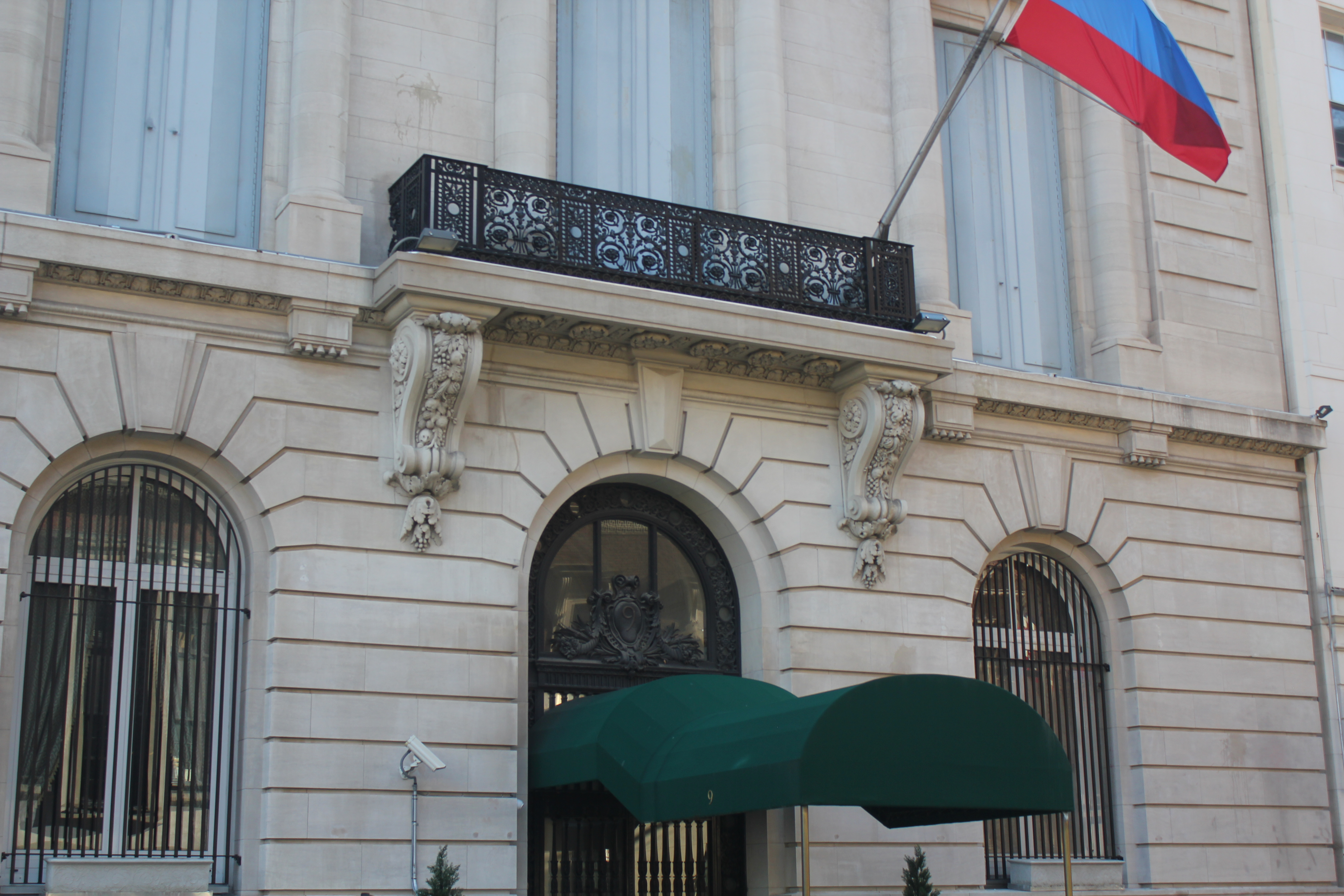
Detail of entrance bay

The upper floors contain masonry panels and are intended to complement the elaborate entablature, frieze, and heavily projecting cornice immediately above. The windows of the third floor are smaller than those on the second floor, and the windows on the fourth floor are even smaller than those below. Atop the third-floor windows are brackets which support cornice shelves. Panels with egg-and-dart moldings separate the fourth-floor windows. An ornate frieze and cornice run above the fourth floor, blocking views of the fifth floor from the street. There is a plain cornice above the set-back fifth floor. The western elevation, facing the private courtyard, is made of limestone. The southernmost two bays of the western elevation are similar to those on the southern elevation, except that the windows on the second floor do not have arched pediments. The rest of the western elevation is made of plain limestone. There is a horizontal string course, a frieze with fleurs-de-lis, and a protruding cornice with lions' heads above the western elevation.

=== Features ===
The building was constructed with a ballroom and 16 bathrooms. The historian Christopher Gray wrote that interior photos from the early 20th century display a "rich series of Louis XVI-style rooms with elaborate marbles, carving, tapestries and furnishings". There were also two elevators. The building was extensively redecorated in the 1990s as part of its conversion into a Russian consulate.

==== First floor ====
The "T"-shaped entrance hall at the first, or ground, floor has white walls with marble pillars, as well as busts and pedestals made of Caen stone. On the right (east) side of the hall, a grand marble staircase ascends to the second floor. Doors on the left (west) side lead to the courtyard shared with the Burden House. A reception room is located at the southwest corner of the house, west of the entrance hall. Originally designed in the Louis XVI style, the reception room had gilded furniture and brocades made of satin. The walls had green-and-white panels with carved-stone frames, above which was a gilded screen with painted panels; there was also a fireplace mantel topped by watercolor paintings. The reception room is complemented by a similarly sized billiards room north of the entrance hall's eastern end, which was originally decorated with dark wood panels and green velours. East of the entrance hall, at the southeast corner, is a study or private library, which had an elaborate fireplace mantel and a vaulted ceiling.

A hallway continues north from the reception room toward the dining room; when the house was built, the hallway had a carved mantelpiece, a marble bust, and draperies. The rooms in the northern portion of the first floor were originally used as dining and breakfast rooms. The dining room originally had French walnut furniture, including a table running for its entire length, and the white-painted French-walnut woodwork was covered with Louis XVI-style red tapestries. There were carved stone decorations throughout the dining room as well. Attached to the dining room is the breakfast room, a circular space. The breakfast room originally had green furniture and a green carpet; the walls were initially covered by stone latticework, and the room was topped by a domed skylight.

==== Second story ====
The second floor has the most elaborately decorated spaces in the house, with a ballroom that could fit 250 people and a music room that could fit 100 people when it was built. These spaces have ceilings measuring 18 feet (5.5 m) high. The ballroom and music room take up much of the second floor, with the remainder of the space being occupied by a library. The ballroom occupies the entire southern frontage of the house, the music room occupies the entire northern frontage, and the library occupies the western frontage between the ballroom and music room. All these spaces are accessed by a reception hall, an elevator, and a grand staircase on the east; the library could also be accessed from both the ballroom and music room. The second-floor reception hall was simple in design, with Spanish tapestries.

The ballroom is variously cited as measuring 28 by 50 feet (8.5 by 15.2 m) or 33 by 64 feet (10 by 20 m). It was originally designed in the Louis XVI style with a white-and-gold color scheme, satin brocades, satin window draperies, and two crystal chandeliers. In the 1990s, the ballroom was redecorated with daisy-and-rose motifs. The music room, meanwhile, is decorated with an arabesque motif. The music room originally had gilded furniture, cabinets with old hand fans, pale-gray wall panels with gilded reliefs, and satin brocades hung next to the windows. The music room had paneled doors, which led directly to the ballroom and could be opened during private events. The second-floor library's decorative features include a barrel vaulted ceiling with strapwork motifs. The library was decorated in an old English style, with walnut paneling and green-velour tapestries.

==== Other stories ====
On the third story were five bedrooms, including the Hammond parents' bedrooms and the guest bedroom. Emily Sloane Hammond had her own bedroom, which was larger than the house's master bedroom, while her husband John Henry Hammond had a second study room on the third floor. The children's bedrooms and a family room were on the fourth story. In addition to a set of rooms for John Henry Hammond Jr., their only son and youngest child, there were a nurse's bedroom and two additional bedrooms on the fourth story. The male servants slept in the basement, as far away as possible from the female servants' bedrooms on the fifth floor. The female servants' quarters consisted of eight rooms. Also on the fifth floor was an infirmary for the Hammond children, in addition to a squash court, which was used for roller skating by two generations of Hammond children.

== History ==
In December 1898, the industrialist Andrew Carnegie bought all of the lots on Fifth Avenue between 90th and 92nd streets, with the intent of building his mansion on some of these plots. Carnegie ultimately decided to erect his mansion on only the plots between 90th and 91st streets. He retained ownership of several nearby lots to protect his home's value, selling them only to "congenial neighbors". Carnegie sold four land lots on 91st Street to the businessman William Douglas Sloane in December 1900. (Note: The National Park Service gives a different date of 1899.) The assemblage is approximately 135 feet (41 m) wide. (Note: Another source gives a figure of 136 feet (41 m).) Sloane intended to build two houses on the site, one for each of his daughters: Florence Sloane Burden, who was married to iron entrepreneur James A. Burden Jr., and Emily Sloane Hammond, who was married to John Henry Hammond. The Burden and Hammond residences were to be separated by a 35-foot-wide (11 m) courtyard. Sloane acquired further land on 91st Street in November 1901 as part of a land swap with Carnegie.

=== Use as residence ===
==== Development ====
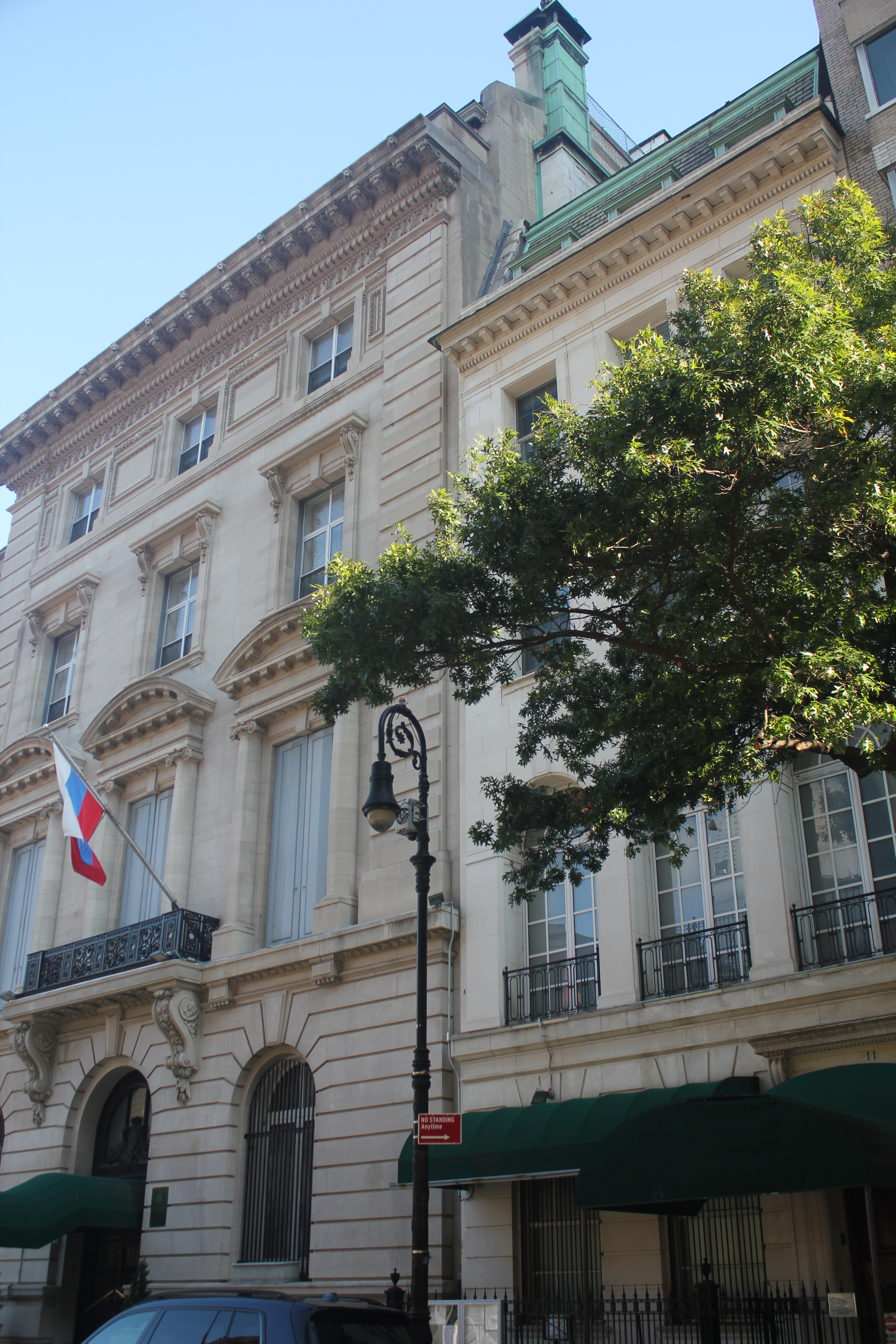
Hammond House on left and John B. Trevor Mansion on right

The building's namesake was John Henry Hammond, a lawyer and businessman; he shared a name with his father, who had been the chief of staff to U.S. Army general William Tecumseh Sherman. Emily Hammond was an heiress to the furniture company W. & J. Sloane through her father and to the Vanderbilt family through her mother. The Hammond family initially lived on 72nd Street after their 1899 marriage. After the Sloane family bought the 91st Street sites, they offered to build a house for the Hammonds there (adjoining the Burdens' house), and Carrère and Hastings were hired to design the house. Sloane was erecting both of his daughters' residences by late 1902. The Building and Sanitary Inspection Company was hired as the drainage and plumbing contractor for both the Hammond and Burden houses, while John W. Rapp was hired to construct the arches.

Hammond's son, the record producer John Henry Hammond Jr., later recalled that his father had protested strenuously against the house's construction and vowed to move there "over [his] dead body". Hammond had specifically objected to the house's location, telling his wife that he was "going to be considered a kept man". While the New York City Landmarks Preservation Commission and The New York Times cite the house as having been completed in 1903, other authors cite the building as having been finished in 1906. The Hammond family is recorded as having hosted an event in the house as early as March 1904.

==== Hammond use ====
Emily and John Hammond lived in the house with their five children and 16 staff. The 1910 United States census described the family as having employed numerous chauffeurs, maids. and governesses, in addition to a butler, kitchen staff, and a footman. When Carnegie tried to split the nearby parcel at 91st Street and Fifth Avenue and sell part of it to Lloyd Bryce in 1906, Sloane and his daughters all opposed the sale. Had Bryce's house been built, it would have abutted the Burden House's western wall, violating a restriction that required that any building on that site be set back from the Burden House's western facade. The Sloanes filed a lawsuit which prevented Carnegie from selling that plot to anyone; they dropped their suit against Carnegie in 1914, when the lot at the corner with Fifth Avenue was sold to Otto Hermann Kahn. The land lot immediately to the east, which was still owned by Carnegie, was resold in 1909 and became the site of John B. Trevor Sr.'s mansion, which was completed in 1911.

When the Hammonds lived in the building, they decorated it with unassuming yet expensive items from W. & J. Sloane company, as Emily Hammond had wanted to avoid any ostentatious furniture. After John Hammond Jr. was born in 1910, a painting of him holding a Pekingese was mounted onto the wall. Growing up in the house, John Jr. became familiar with jazz music by age eight, in part because he often heard it being played in servants' bedrooms. The house routinely hosted concerts with three hundred guests, and jazz musicians frequented the house, including Benny Goodman, who later married John Jr.'s sister Alice. John Jr. and his sister Emily often gave concerts to guests.

After John Jr. had moved out of the house, he ate dinner with his family there every week. At dinnertime, it took a long time to transport food from the basement to the kitchen; according to one of the Hammond daughters, Adele Hammond Emery, her father joked that "he'd never had a hot meal". The house also hosted events such as fundraising benefits, receptions and meetings for various neighborhood groups, and debutante balls. In addition, the house hosted wedding receptions for Adele Hammond and Alice Hammond in 1927. One daughter, Rachel Hammond Breck, noted that her mother's parties at the house never lasted long, mainly because she did not serve alcohol. Originally, the Hammond House and several other houses along the block were restricted to residential use because of a covenant placed by Andrew Carnegie. When Kahn died in 1934, Kahn's estate sought to sell their house to the Convent of the Sacred Heart, a private girls' school, and the restriction was lifted.

==== Castroviejo use ====
The Hammonds sold the house in May 1946 to eye surgeon Ramón Castroviejo, who slightly modified the interior. Castroviejo used the house as his office and residence. He operated an eye hospital on the top two floors, where he sometimes performed eye surgery on Cuban citizens who were otherwise not allowed to enter the United States. Under Castroviejo's ownership, the house hosted lavish parties for celebrities including British actress Hermione Gingold and Spanish Catalan operatic soprano Victoria de los Ángeles. In 1958, Castroviejo is recorded as having transferred ownership to Cynthia S. Castroviejo, a family member. By April 1975, Castroviejo had left the house.

=== Soviet and Russian consulate ===
==== Purchase and initial renovation ====
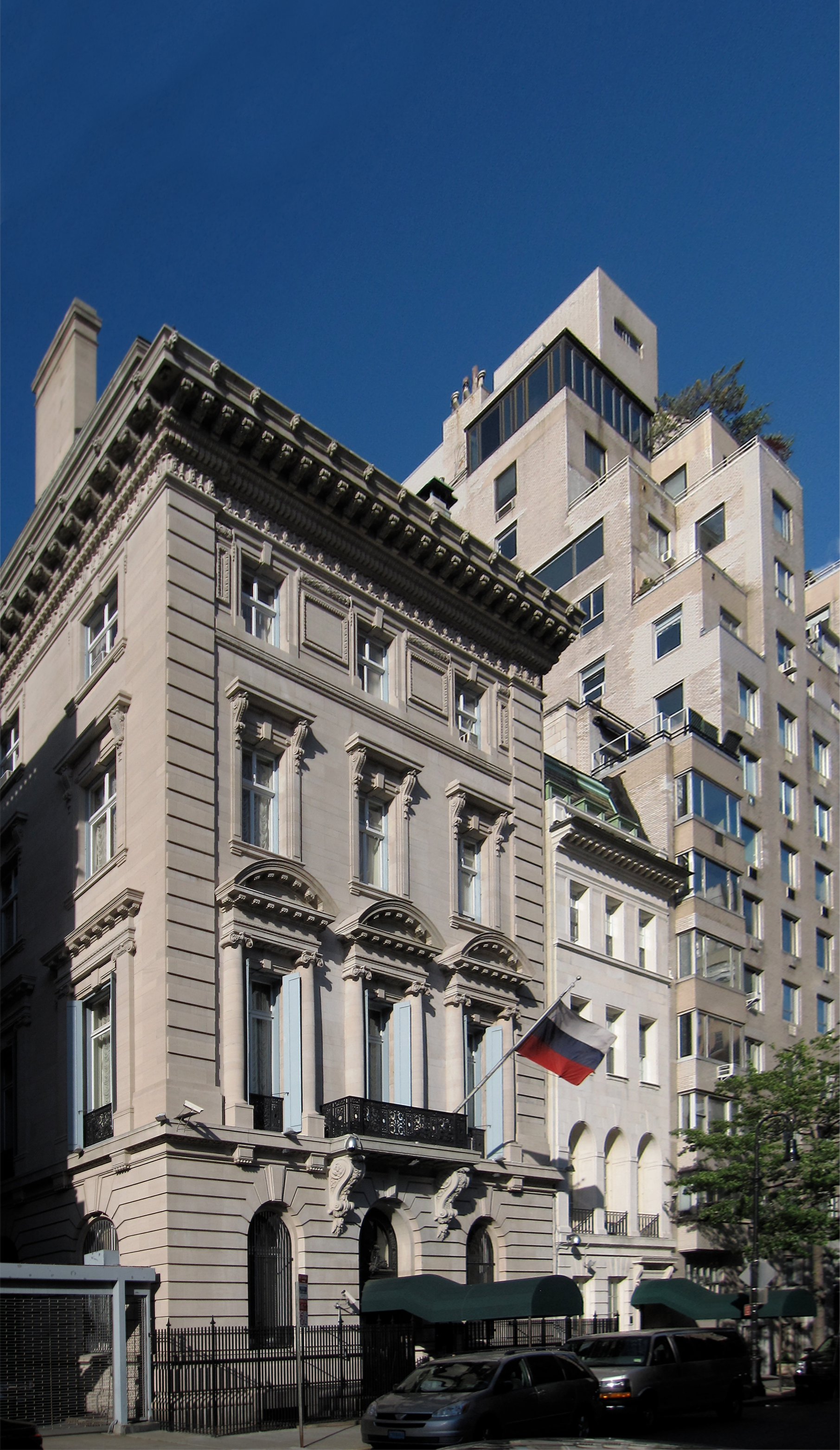
The house as viewed from the west

After the restoration of diplomatic relations between the United States and Soviet Union in 1974, the government of the Soviet Union sought to open a consulate in New York City, in exchange for the U.S. being allowed to open a consulate in Kiev (now Kyiv). The Soviet Union's previous consulate at 7 East 61st Street had been closed since 1948 following diplomatic disputes. The Soviet government sought to acquire the Hammond House, which was reportedly valued at between $1.5 million and $1.7 million (equivalent to $9–10.2 million in 2025). William Gleckman, who was responsible for the renovation of the building, noted that the Soviet Consul-designate admired the building as it reminded him of imperial architecture in Russia. Before deciding on the Hammond House, the Soviet government had considered a hundred other buildings.

The Convent of the Sacred Heart, which owned the Burden House, sold its portion of the courtyard east of the house to the Soviet government for $100,000 (equivalent to $600,000 in 2025), before the Soviet government had finalized the Hammond House's acquisition. In June 1975, representatives of the USSR asked the LPC for permission to add a parking ramp within the courtyard. The Soviet government delayed their acquisition of the house pending the LPC's decision. The LPC ultimately approved the construction of a fence outside the house; a gate across the courtyard; and bars in front of the first- and second-story windows. The Soviet Union closed off the courtyard and demolished the fountain inside. One reporter wrote that "a veritable 'Berlin Wall' separates the mansions once owned by the Sloane sisters", the Burden and Hammond houses. The government of the Soviet Union purchased the house from Castroviejo in August 1975 for $1.6 million (equivalent to $9.6 million in 2025). The New York City Police Department (NYPD) assigned officers to guard the street outside the house at all times; passersby began frequenting 91st Street at night, as they felt that it was safer than parallel streets.

The Soviet government began renovating the house immediately after acquiring it. Gleckman installed new electrical wiring, a theater, air-conditioning, and closed-circuit cameras on the facade. In 1976, the Soviet government paid $398,500 (equivalent to $2.4 million in 2025) for the neighboring Trevor Mansion at 11 East 91st Street. During the renovation, the house hosted events such as receptions, and neighbors recalled that the consulate's 17 employees often sent them gifts and invited them to parties. The Soviet Union had made significant progress on the Hammond House's renovation by the end of 1977, but the U.S. had not even finalized a contract for its consulate in Kiev at the time. Due to a clause that required both consulates to open at the same time, the Soviet consulate in New York City could not formally open. The consulate continued to "decorate" the house (with four or five workers on site at any given time), and it provided assistance to Soviet citizens. The United States Department of State authorized the consulate to host "limited commercial and cultural activities" and plan new offices, but not to issue visas.

==== Abandonment and restoration ====
Following the Soviet invasion of Afghanistan in 1979, the United States withdrew its consular staff from Kiev and ordered 17 Soviet diplomats at the New York City consulate to leave. At the time of the expulsions, the Soviet government had spent $500,000 on renovations (equivalent to $2.2 million in 2025). The NYPD continued to guard the house at all times until October 1980, even though the house's only regular occupant was its caretaker, with occasional visits by officials of the Soviet Embassy to the United States. The NYPD guard was reinstated that December after the nearby 23rd Precinct received a call claiming that an "Inspector Whitmore" had ordered the precinct to continue guarding the residence in response to the Polish crisis of 1980–1981. After a Soviet van was robbed nearby in May 1982, the NYPD's intelligence division was notified that the incident had occurred near the house's police booth. When intelligence officers stated that they were unaware of the booth, NYPD officials discovered that Inspector Whitmore was fictitious and that they had been deceived into reinstating the house's police guard; the police department subsequently canceled the guard again and disassembled the booth.

After the dissolution of the Soviet Union, the Russian Federation and the U.S. decided in 1990 to open their respective consulates. At the time, Christopher Gray of The New York Times wrote that the house had been boarded up and resembled "some grand, mothballed ocean liner". When the Russian Consul-general to New York City, Ivan A. Kuznetsov, visited the house in 1992, he discovered that the house was in an advanced state of disrepair: The house had peeling paint, a leaky roof, collapsing plaster ceilings, and non-functioning mechanical systems. Kuznetsov hired 16 artisans from Moscow to renovate the building. The publishing company Random House, which had just published a book titled The Russian Century, (Note: For the book, see: Moynahan, Brian (1995). The Russian Century: A History of the Last 100 Years. Random House. ISBN 0-679-76436-4.) became involved after it contacted Kuznetsov and offered to help fund the renovation. In addition, Stanley Barrows, who had previously led the Fashion Institute of Technology's interior design department, oversaw the interior design work.

Random House's publisher Harold Evans convinced numerous professionals to donate their time to renovate their house. Almost all of the contractors who worked on the house did so for free, except for the curtain supplier, the caterer, and the designers of the house's exhibitions. A local studio created three designs of fabric, one each for the ballroom, library, and music room. According to a New York Times report, Barrows was especially focused on the details of the renovation; for example, the colors of the draperies were swapped out three times, and Barrows ordered workers to repaint the ballroom because he thought they were not using enough gold paint. One of Barrows's students recalled that it took him fifty hours just to look for specific decorations for three rooms. By the end of 1994, the house was nearly complete.

==== Mid-1990s to present ====
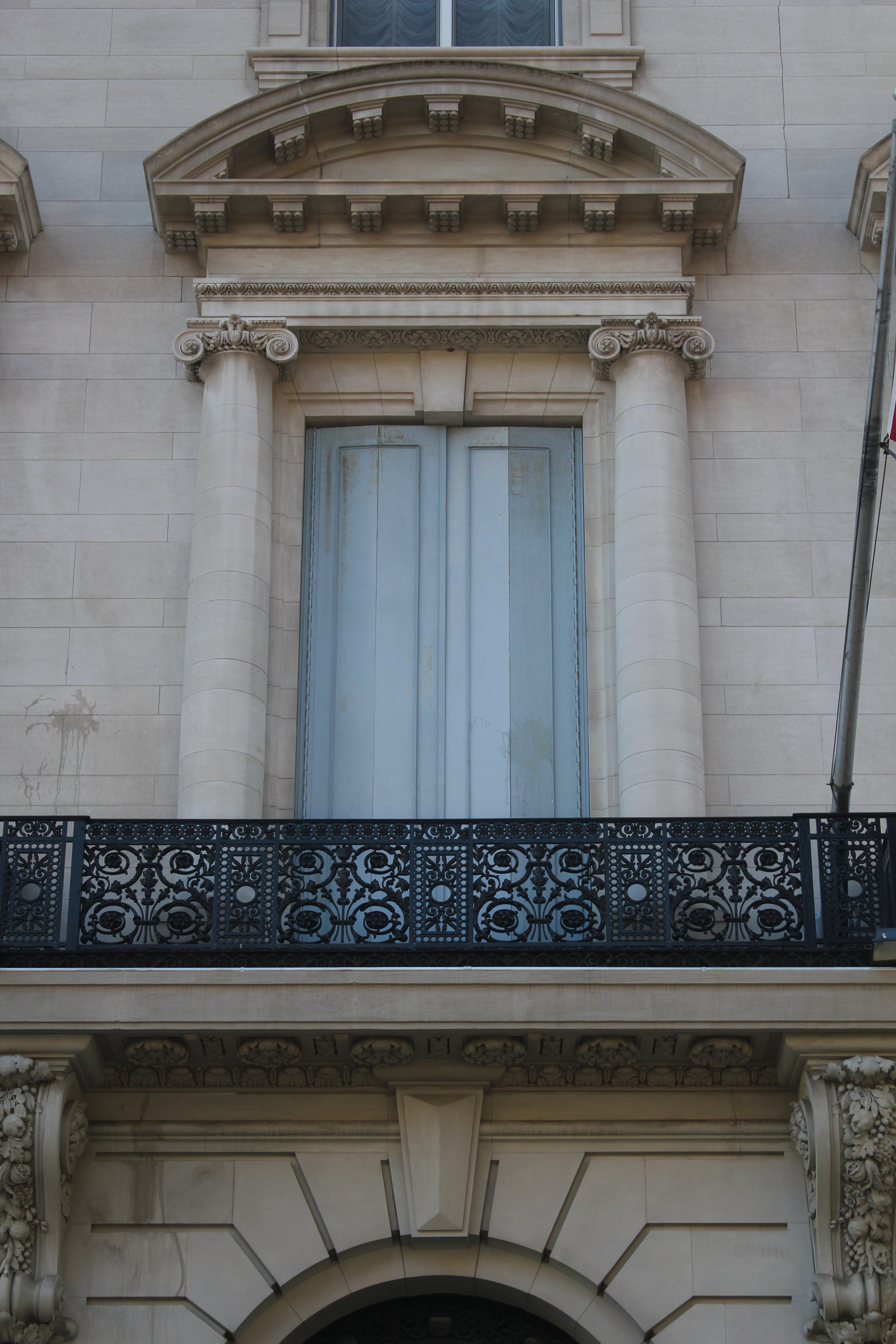
Detail of a second-story window

The first official event to take place at the house after its renovation was on October 26, 1994, when the Russian Federation hosted an exhibit on Random House's The Russian Century. Work on the house continued through 1995. In addition to serving as Russia's New York City consulate, the house was used as a polling place for Russian nationals in the city who wanted to vote in parliamentary elections. It was also sometimes used for events, such as opera performances and speeches by visiting Russian politicians. The Russian Consulate General to New York City continues to use the house in the 21st century. Christopher Gray estimated in 2014 that the house was likely to be sold for more than $100 million if the Russian Consulate General moved out.

During the 21st century, the house and consulate were sometimes the subject of protests in response to the Russian Federation's military actions. For example, there were protests outside the house after the Russo-Georgian War in 2008, the annexation of Crimea by Russia in 2014, and the Russian invasion of Ukraine in 2022. In addition, the facade was vandalized in 2022 after Russian president Vladimir Putin announced Russia's annexation of the Donetsk, Kherson, Luhansk and Zaporizhzhia oblasts in Ukraine.

== Impact ==
When the Burden, Hammond, and Carnegie houses were developed, a critic in the Real Estate Record wrote that "Their influence on the value of surrounding land is such that it is impossible to erect any but superior buildings in the neighborhood on account of the high price of land." Architectural critic Henry Hope Reed Jr. wrote in 1961 that the Kahn, Burden, and Hammond houses were "the crown jewel of the block". A New York Times article stated in 1975 that the building was "considered one of the finest Carrere and Hastings residences", and the writer Francis Morrone praised the house's "fine Ionic colonnettes" in a 2009 guidebook. Christopher Gray wrote in 2014 that the house helped form one of the "grandest blocks" in the city.

The LPC first proposed the Carnegie Hill Historic District in 1966, which would have included the Hammond House. The New York City Landmarks Preservation Commission (LPC) designated the house as a landmark on July 24, 1974, citing its history and architectural features. The designation came in spite of objections by Castroviejo, who at the time owned the house. The house was not initially one of the properties listed as part of the Carnegie Hill Historic District, which was designated the same year. When the Carnegie Hill Historic District was expanded in 1993, the Hammond House was included in the expanded district.

== See also ==
- Consulate General of Russia, New York City
- List of New York City Designated Landmarks in Manhattan from 59th to 110th Streets
