= Bethany, Wolfe County, Kentucky =

Unincorporated community in Kentucky, United States

Bethany
- Unincorporated community
- Location within the state of Kentucky Bethany (the United States)
- Coordinates: 37°39′1″N 83°28′25″W
- Country: United States
- State: Kentucky
- County: Wolfe
- Elevation: 830 ft (250 m)
- Time zone: UTC-5 (Eastern (EST))
  - Summer (DST): UTC-4 (EDT)
- ZIP codes: 41301
- GNIS feature ID: 486924

Bethany is a farm community which lies 7 miles southeast of Campton the county seat of Wolfe County, KY. Its elevation in 830 feet and its population is approximately 300. It is home to Bethany Christian Mission. A small private school serving approximately 30 students. Bethany is known for its rolling hills and cattle farms.
