= John Henry Hammond (lawyer) =

American lawyer, financier, and legal author (1871–1949)

- John Henry Hammond (1871–1949)
- Born: April 15, 1871; Louisville, Kentucky, U.S.
- Died: June 28, 1949 (aged 78)
- Occupations: Lawyer, financier, legal author
- Spouse: Emily Vanderbilt Sloane
- Children: John Henry Hammond Jr.
- Parent(s): John Henry Hammond; Sophia Vernon Wolfe

John Henry Hammond (April 15, 1871 – June 28, 1949) was an American lawyer, financier, and legal author active in New York during the late nineteenth and early twentieth centuries. He practiced corporate law, served in banking and advisory roles, and authored early twentieth-century works on the taxation of business corporations in New York State.

He was the husband of Emily Vanderbilt Sloane, the son of John Henry Hammond (Union Army officer), the brother of Ogden Hammond and the father of record producer John Henry Hammond Jr.

== Early life and education ==
Hammond was born in Louisville, Kentucky, the son of Union Army General John Henry Hammond and Sophia Vernon Wolfe, daughter of Kentucky Attorney General Nathaniel Wolfe.

He was raised in St. Paul, Minnesota. He attended Phillips Exeter Academy, graduated from Yale University in 1891, and received an LL.B. from Columbia Law School in 1895.

== Legal career ==
Hammond was admitted to the New York bar and practiced corporate law in New York City. His work included representation of railroad and industrial interests during a period of economic expansion.

In 1901 he authored Taxation of Business Corporations in New York State, a comprehensive treatment of franchise taxes and corporate taxation law in New York, published by Baker, Voorhis & Company.

He also published A Supplement to Hammond on Taxation of Business Corporations in the State of New York later that year, addressing statutory amendments and appellate decisions affecting corporate taxation.

Copies of his works are held in major law libraries, including the Harvard Law Library.

Contemporary accounts described him as a banker and former state legal aide.

== Marriage and family ==
Hammond married Emily Sloan Vanderbilt, daughter of William Douglas Sloane and Emily Thorn Vanderbilt, on April 5, 1899, at St. Bartholomew's Episcopal Church in New York City. The wedding received widespread press coverage.

One regional newspaper headline characterized the union as "To Marry a Poor Man," reflecting contemporary perceptions of the financial disparity between the Vanderbilt and Hammond families.

In his autobiography Hammond on Record, their son, John Henry Hammond Jr. (1910–1987), who became an influential record producer associated with Columbia Records, later wrote of the difference in wealth between the families, remarking that “The Hammonds never had money. They married it.”

== Residence ==
After their marriage, Hammond and his family resided at 9 East 91st Street in Manhattan, in the townhouse later known as the John Henry Hammond House. The residence later became historically notable and has served as the Russian Consulate in New York.

In later years Hammond maintained a country farm residence known as “Dellwood” in Armonk, New York where he bred award-winning cattle while continuing his law practice.

Following John Henry Hammond's death in 1949, his widow, Emily Vanderbilt Sloane, donated their Westchester County estate to the Moral Re-Armament movement. The property was given for use as a conference and training center for the organization's activities.

== Later life and death ==
Hammond died on June 28, 1949. A full obituary appeared in The New York Times the following day.
