= Flat, Kentucky =

Unincorporated community in Kentucky, United States

Flat
- Unincorporated community
- Location within the state of Kentucky Flat (the United States)
- Coordinates: 37°39′15″N 83°32′48″W
- Country: United States
- State: Kentucky
- County: Wolfe
- Elevation: 860 ft (260 m)
- Time zone: UTC-5 (Eastern (EST))
  - Summer (DST): UTC-4 (EST)
- ZIP codes: 41325
- GNIS feature ID: 512182

Flat is an unincorporated community in Wolfe County, Kentucky, United States. The Flat post office was established in 1892. Its post office has since been discontinued.

The origin of the name "Flat" is obscure.
