= Wolfe County, Kentucky =

County in Kentucky, United States

- County
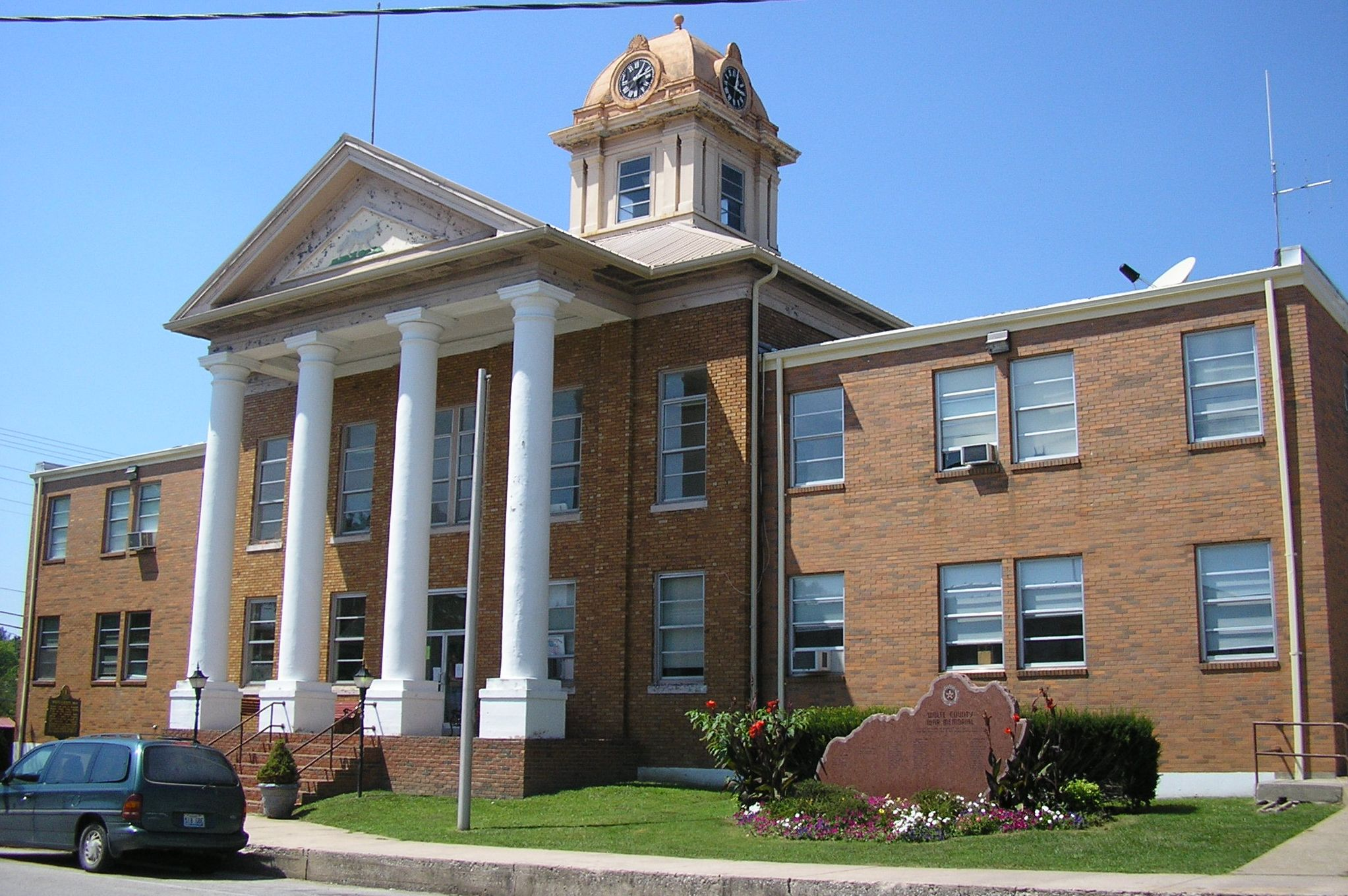
- Wolfe County courthouse in Campton

- Location within the U.S. state of Kentucky
- Coordinates: 37°44′N 83°29′W
- Country: United States
- State: Kentucky
- Founded: 1860
- Named for: The Wolfe family out of Western North Carolina
- Seat: Campton
- Largest city: Campton

Government
  - Judge/Executive: Raymond Banks (D)

Area
  - Total: 223 sq mi (580 km^{2})
  - Land: 222 sq mi (570 km^{2})
  - Water: 0.6 sq mi (1.6 km^{2}) 0.3%

Population (2020)
  - Total: 6,562
  - Estimate (2025): 6,298 ▼
  - Density: 29.6/sq mi (11.4/km^{2})
- Time zone: UTC−5 (Eastern)
  - Summer (DST): UTC−4 (EDT)
- Congressional district: 5th
- Website: https://www.wolfecountyky.com/

Wolfe County is a county located in the U.S. state of Kentucky. As of the 2020 census, the population was 6,562. Its county seat is Campton. The county is named for Nathaniel Wolfe, one of the first two graduates of the University of Virginia School of Laws in 1829 and a loyal Unionist attorney for Jefferson County, Kentucky.

== History ==
Wolfe County was formed on March 5, 1860, from portions of Breathitt County, Morgan County, Owsley County and Powell County. It was named for Nathaniel Wolfe, an attorney and member of the legislative assembly.

Campton, the county's seat was reportedly formed from camp town in Wolfe County. A small creek winding through Campton, Swift Creek, is named after Jonathan Swift of the legend of Swift's silver mine. Swift supposedly buried treasure in the area which has never been recovered.

== Geography ==
According to the U.S. Census Bureau, the county has a total area of 223 square miles (580 km^{2}), of which 222 square miles (570 km^{2}) is land and 0.6 square miles (1.6 km^{2}) (0.3%) is water.

=== Adjacent counties ===
- Menifee County (north)
- Morgan County (northeast)
- Magoffin County (east)
- Breathitt County (southeast)
- Lee County (southwest)
- Powell County (northwest)

=== National protected area ===
- Daniel Boone National Forest (part)

=== State protected area ===
- Home to Torrent Falls

== Demographics ==
Historical population
Census	Pop.	Note	%±
1870	3,603		—
1880	5,638		56.5%
1890	7,180		27.4%
1900	8,764		22.1%
1910	9,864		12.6%
1920	8,783		−11.0%
1930	8,425		−4.1%
1940	9,997		18.7%
1950	7,615		−23.8%
1960	6,534		−14.2%
1970	5,669		−13.2%
1980	6,698		18.2%
1990	6,503		−2.9%
2000	7,065		8.6%
2010	7,355		4.1%
2020	6,562		−10.8%
2025 (est.)	6,298	▼	−4.0%
U.S. Decennial Census; 1790-1960 1900-1990; 1990-2000 2010-2021

=== 2020 census ===
As of the 2020 census, the county had a population of 6,562. The median age was 42.0 years. 23.4% of residents were under the age of 18 and 19.2% of residents were 65 years of age or older. For every 100 females there were 98.8 males, and for every 100 females age 18 and over there were 94.7 males age 18 and over.

The racial makeup of the county was 97.3% White, 0.4% Black or African American, 0.2% American Indian and Alaska Native, 0.1% Asian, 0.1% Native Hawaiian and Pacific Islander, 0.3% from some other race, and 1.6% from two or more races. Hispanic or Latino residents of any race comprised 0.9% of the population.

0.0% of residents lived in urban areas, while 100.0% lived in rural areas.

There were 2,634 households in the county, of which 30.1% had children under the age of 18 living with them and 27.7% had a female householder with no spouse or partner present. About 30.4% of all households were made up of individuals and 13.2% had someone living alone who was 65 years of age or older.

There were 3,021 housing units, of which 12.8% were vacant. Among occupied housing units, 72.5% were owner-occupied and 27.5% were renter-occupied. The homeowner vacancy rate was 0.7% and the rental vacancy rate was 3.9%.

=== 2000 census ===
As of the census of 2000, there were 7,065 people, 2,816 households, and 1,976 families residing in the county. The population density was 32 per square mile (12/km^{2}). There were 3,264 housing units at an average density of 15 per square mile (5.8/km^{2}). The racial makeup of the county was 99.24% White, 0.24% Black or African American, 0.08% Native American, 0.03% Asian, 0.03% Pacific Islander, 0.06% from other races, and 0.33% from two or more races. 0.51% of the population were Hispanic or Latino of any race.

There were 2,816 households, out of which 33.60% had children under the age of 18 living with them, 52.30% were married couples living together, 12.50% had a female householder with no husband present, and 29.80% were non-families. 27.00% of all households were made up of individuals, and 9.70% had someone living alone who was 65 years of age or older. The average household size was 2.45 and the average family size was 2.96.

In the county, the population was spread out, with 25.90% under the age of 18, 9.40% from 18 to 24, 28.50% from 25 to 44, 23.50% from 45 to 64, and 12.70% who were 65 years of age or older. The median age was 36 years. For every 100 females there were 98.50 males. For every 100 females age 18 and over, there were 96.10 males.

The median income for a household in the county was $19,310, and the median income for a family was $23,333. Males had a median income of $23,859 versus $18,952 for females. The per capita income for the county was $10,321. About 29.90% of families and 35.90% of the population were below the poverty line, including 50.20% of those under age 18 and 26.70% of those age 65 or over.

Wolfe County is the poorest county in the United States, by median household income.

== Politics ==
United States presidential election results for Wolfe County, Kentucky
Year	Republican		Democratic		Third party(ies)	
Year	No.	%	No.	%	No.	%
1912	395	25.92%	873	57.28%	256	16.80%
1916	645	36.67%	1,108	62.99%	6	0.34%
1920	939	38.61%	1,476	60.69%	17	0.70%
1924	821	33.72%	1,597	65.59%	17	0.70%
1928	1,270	48.36%	1,356	51.64%	0	0.00%
1932	909	28.13%	2,321	71.81%	2	0.06%
1936	972	38.13%	1,577	61.87%	0	0.00%
1940	1,032	31.88%	2,205	68.12%	0	0.00%
1944	889	37.98%	1,450	61.94%	2	0.09%
1948	813	29.73%	1,918	70.13%	4	0.15%
1952	876	35.98%	1,557	63.94%	2	0.08%
1956	1,059	38.62%	1,683	61.38%	0	0.00%
1960	1,259	44.76%	1,554	55.24%	0	0.00%
1964	562	21.64%	2,018	77.71%	17	0.65%
1968	758	34.35%	1,162	52.65%	287	13.00%
1972	936	48.83%	957	49.92%	24	1.25%
1976	659	26.81%	1,777	72.29%	22	0.90%
1980	951	33.90%	1,814	64.67%	40	1.43%
1984	1,257	46.68%	1,394	51.76%	42	1.56%
1988	916	36.94%	1,516	61.13%	48	1.94%
1992	697	25.97%	1,674	62.37%	313	11.66%
1996	772	33.61%	1,297	56.46%	228	9.93%
2000	1,267	52.25%	1,136	46.85%	22	0.91%
2004	1,385	43.90%	1,744	55.28%	26	0.82%
2008	1,408	47.44%	1,493	50.30%	67	2.26%
2012	1,542	60.26%	976	38.14%	41	1.60%
2016	1,804	68.46%	753	28.58%	78	2.96%
2020	2,097	70.39%	839	28.16%	43	1.44%
2024	2,163	74.10%	689	23.60%	67	2.30%

Wolfe County, like most of Eastern Kentucky, is historically Democratic; in every presidential election from its creation in 1860 until 1996, the county had an uninterrupted Democratic voting streak. In 2000, George W. Bush narrowly won the county and became the first Republican to do so, but the county still proved its Democratic loyalty by supporting John Kerry by a comfortable margin in the next election. However, the county has indeed drifted away from the Democrats at the presidential level as Mitt Romney won the county 60% to 38% in 2012, and Donald Trump with an even wider margin of 68% to 29%.

Wolfe remained reliably Democratic at the state level for some time after ceasing to favor the Democratic Party at the presidential level; it voted against Matt Bevin in both of his gubernatorial elections. Wolfe County has not voted for a Republican gubernatorial candidate since 1979 when it voted for Republican and former Governor Louie Nunn over Democrat John Y. Brown Jr. Along with nearby Elliott County, it was, until 2020, one of only two counties in Kentucky to have voted against Senator Mitch McConnell in each of his elections. In 2020, however, both counties voted for McConnell over his Democratic challenger, Amy McGrath.

=== Elected officials ===
Elected officials as of January 3, 2025
U.S. House	Hal Rogers (R)	KY 5
Ky. Senate	Brandon Smith (R)	30
Ky. House	Timmy Truett (R)	89

== Events ==
The annual Swift Silver Mine Festival is held on Labor Day weekend each year. It includes a parade and vendors in the downtown Campton area.

== Communities ==
=== City ===
- Campton (county seat)

=== Census-designated place ===
- Hazel Green

=== Other unincorporated places ===
- Baptist
- Bear Pen
- Belknap
- Bethany
- Burkhart
- Callaboose
- Flat
- Lee City
- Pence
- Pine Ridge
- Rogers
- Torrent
- Trent
- Valeria
- Zachariah

== Notable people ==
- Pete Center, who pitched for the Cleveland Indians in the 1940s.
- Folk artist Edgar Tolson; Ralph Rinzler of the Smithsonian Institution was impressed by Tolson's figures, and included them in the 1971 Festival of American Folklife.
- South Trimble, politician, born near Hazel Green
- Tyler Booth, Country singer, grew up near the city Campton, Kentucky.

== See also ==
- Wolfe County High School
- Hazel Green Academy
- National Register of Historic Places listings in Wolfe County, Kentucky
- Red River Gorge
