= Pence, Wolfe County, Kentucky =

Unincorporated community in Kentucky, United States

Pence, Kentucky
- Unincorporated community
- Location within Kentucky
- Coordinates: 37°38′02″N 83°28′27″W
- Country: United States
- State: Kentucky
- County: Wolfe
- Elevation: 804 ft (245 m)
- Time zone: UTC-5 (Eastern (EST))
  - Summer (DST): UTC-4 (EDT)
- Area code: 606
- GNIS feature ID: 508796

Pence is an unincorporated community in Wolfe County, Kentucky, United States.
