= Ramón Castroviejo =

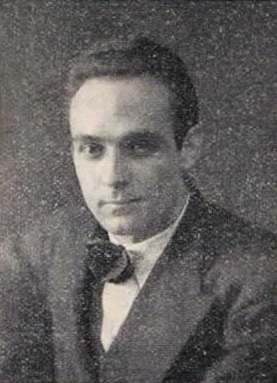
- Ramon Castroviejo in 1928
- Born: Ramón Castroviejo Briones; August 24, 1904; Logroño, La Rioja, Spain
- Died: January 2, 1987 (aged 82); Madrid, Spain
- Education: Complutense University of Madrid
- Years active: 1927–1975
- Known for: Improving corneal transplantation technique
- Medical career
- Profession: Ophthalmologist
- Research: Corneal transplantation

Ramón Castroviejo Briones (August 24, 1904 – January 2, 1987) was a Spanish and American eye surgeon remembered for his achievements in corneal transplantation.

== Biography ==
Born in Logroño, Spain, he received his medical education at the Complutense University of Madrid. He graduated in 1927 and worked at the Chicago Eye, Ear, Nose and Throat Hospital and the Mayo Clinic. In 1931, he came to Columbia Presbyterian Medical Center in New York. He became the director of Ophthalmology at St. Vincent's Hospital before he opened his own hospital when he bought the Hammond House. After his retirement he moved to Madrid where he died.

== Achievements ==
While not being the first to successfully graft human cornea, he improved the technique of the operation in the 1930s and 1940s, prompting the worldwide adoption of corneal transplantation as a standard way to deal with severe corneal pathology. His keratoplasty technique remained standard until more efficient suture materials became available.

Castroviejo designed the Castroviejo needle holder, an instrument used in eye, dental and other forms of microsurgery.

== See also ==
- Vladimir Filatov - a Soviet contemporary of Castroviejo that was also a pioneer in corneal transplantation.

== Books, articles by Castroviejo ==
- Atlas of Keratectomy and Keratoplasty. Ramon Castroviejo. 446 pages. Published by W.B. SAUNDERS COMPANY in 1966.
