= Culture of Eastern Kentucky =

Eastern Kentucky, sometimes referred to as Appalachian Kentucky, is comprised of 54 rural counties in the eastern and southern part of the state. The region is rich in a culture that has evolved over decades without excessive outside influence due to the region's geographic isolation by the Appalachian Mountains. The people of the region hold distinct Appalachian values such as kinship, self-sufficiency, and traditionalism. And, while not all of Kentucky identifies with the characteristics of Southern American culture, Eastern Kentucky's rural communities have distinct Southern influences like religious devotion (mainly Protestant) and Southern hospitality. Eastern Kentucky's unique blend of Southern and Appalachian traits has made its culture what it is today.

== History ==
In the late 19th and early 20th centuries, the coal industry moved into Eastern Kentucky to capitalize on the vast amounts of this "black gold" stored within the mountains of the region. These companies built entire towns called company towns to support populations of miners. These towns and the land they occupied were almost, if not entirely, company-owned and non-locally owned. This made the miners and their families reliant on the coal companies. So, when the Great Depression started to take hold of Appalachia in 1927, companies cutting miners' wages sent these mining communities into crisis.

It was then in the early 1930s that miners began to unionize and fight for fair wages and safe working conditions. This unionizing developed into a violent conflict that lasted from 1931 to 1939, known as the Harlan County War, or Bloody Harlan. It was also during this time that the New Deal took effect and brought in money for housing, healthcare, and infrastructure into the region. By the end of the 1930s, the miners of Appalachian Kentucky had gained greater control over their working conditions, and their communities were beginning to heal from the previous devastation caused by the Great Depression and subsequent crash of the coal industry.

While coal did have another boom in the region during the Second World War, the industry never returned to what it had been pre-Great Depression and has been slowly leaving the region since the 1990s, taking its jobs and income with it. This economic decline has left much of the region unemployed and impoverished. Additionally, coal mining has had a lasting direct and indirect negative impact on the health, education, and the environment of the region. These negative effects, along with crippling infrastructure, opioid addiction, and poverty, are the primary struggles of those in the region today.

== Music ==
Music has always been an important part of Eastern Kentucky's Culture with genres such as bluegrass, folk, and traditional country. The most common instruments used in traditional Eastern Kentucky music are banjos, dulcimers, fiddles, guitars, and mandolins. Additionally, most songs feature themes of religion, struggle, family, and addiction.

Protest songs

- Which Side Are You On (Florence Reece 1931)- Written by the wife of a union organizer during the Harlan County War.
- Black Waters (Jean Ritchie 1971)- Written about the devastation caused by strip mining in the region.

Bluegrass artists

- Bill Monroe
- Osborne Brothers
- Ricky Skaggs

Religious music artists

- Anne Wilson
- Stephen McWhirter
- Bleach

Other popular artists

- Tyler Childers
- Chris Stapelton
- Loretta Lynn
- The Judds
- The Creekers
- Sturgill Simpson
- Nicholas Jamerson
- Keith Whitley

== Food ==
Eastern Kentucky food is most distinctly characterized by its affordability and portion sizes. Most traditional Appalachian Kentucky dishes are made to be shared by many to account for large families or kinfolk gathering for meals. They also typically use inexpensive ingredients that are plentiful in the region. Additionally, home gardens are common in Eastern Kentucky, and the produce from these gardens is often shared between family members and throughout the community. The most commonly grown crops such as beans, tomatoes, and corn are also found very often in Eastern Kentucky Recipes.

=== Traditional Eastern Kentucky foods ===
==== Entrees ====
- Soup beans
- Country fried steak
- Chicken and Dumplings
- Biscuits and gravy
- Salmon patties
- Fried catfish
- Slaw dogs
- Potato soup
- Hot Browns
- Country Ham

==== Sides ====
- Corn bread
- Sauerkraut
- Potato salad
- Greasy Beans
- Macaroni and tomatoes
- Fried cabbage
- Fried apples
- Grits
- Greens

==== Other ====
- Deer jerky
- Cobbler
- Apple butter
- Ale-8-One

== Dialect ==
Eastern Kentuckians, being isolated for so long, developed their own unique dialect and vocabulary. The dialect often features the dropping of syllables or ending sounds, making some words seem to blend. It can also be described as a mix of an Appalachian twang (nasally) and a Southern drawl. The accent is very recognisable and also very stigmatized. Many people generalize people with this accent as being uneducated or stupid.

=== Words and phrases, and their meanings ===
- Holler – Valley
- Tore up – Upset
- Bless your heart – You poor thing
- Tickled – Made happy by
- Fixin’ – Getting ready to
- Supper – Evening meal
