= Dr. Henry Clay House =

Historic house in Kentucky, United States

- U.S. National Register of Historic Places
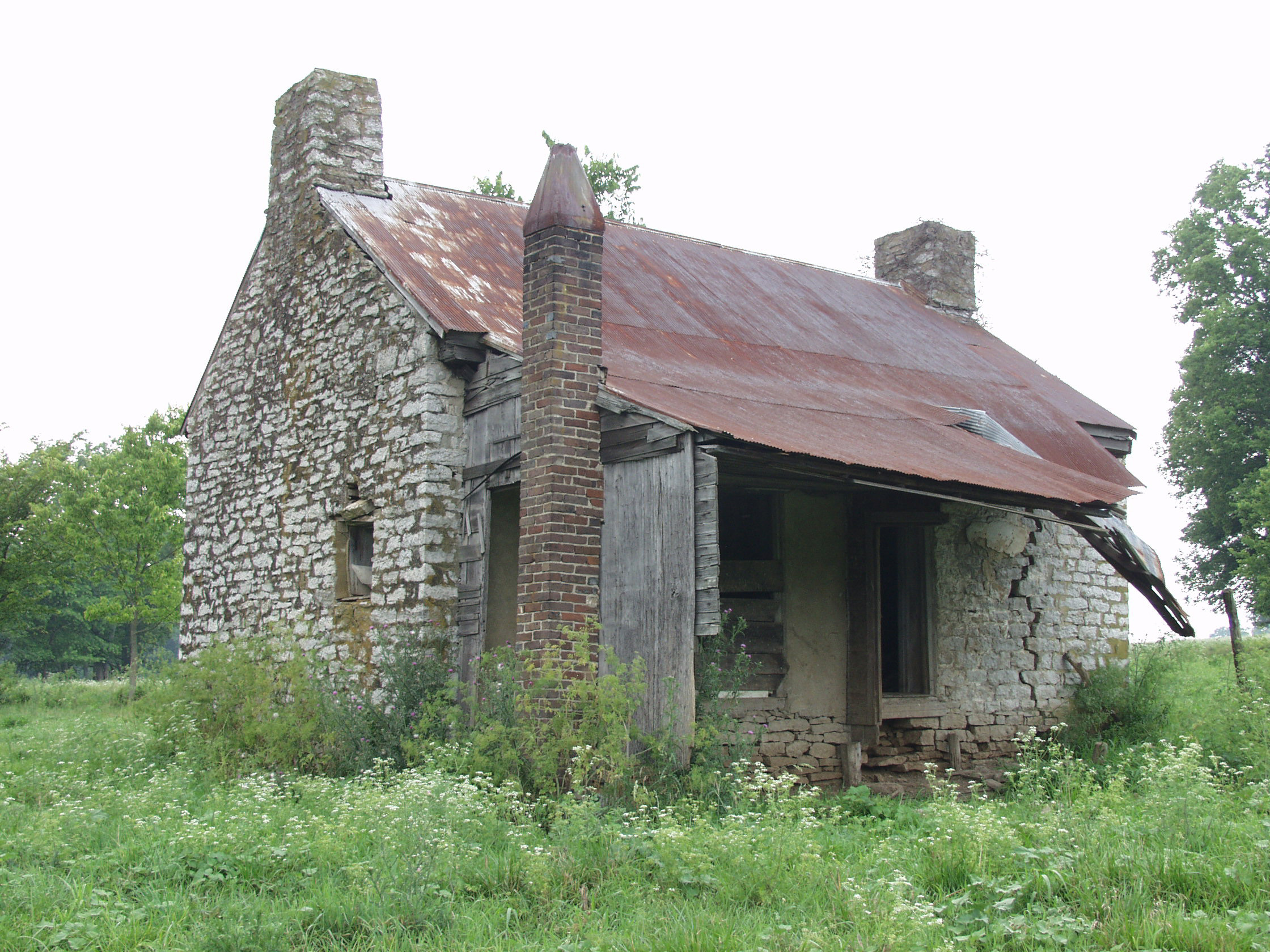

- Location within Kentucky Location within the United States
- Location: Off Kentucky Route 227 near Paris, Kentucky
- Coordinates: 38°08′18″N 84°13′53″W
- Area: 2 acres (0.81 ha)
- MPS: Early Stone Buildings of Central Kentucky TR
- NRHP reference No.: 83002558
- Added to NRHP: August 22, 1983

The Dr. Henry Clay House near Paris, Kentucky was listed on the National Register of Historic Places in 1982.

Located in the Bluegrass region of Kentucky, this house was built by Revolutionary War contributor Henry Clay, (first cousin, once removed, of politician Henry Clay) in 1787. He was given the title "Dr" by members of the Filson Club in Louisville, in writing Clay family histories. To date there is no contemporaneous documentation of that title.

== Property ==
The property runs along a farm road which goes southwest from Winchester Road in Bourbon County, Kentucky. The house, known locally as "the Fort", is a very early small stone house built as a rare double pen, with one-and-one-half stories with interior end chimneys. The lower floor has two rooms and stairs in the northeast corner that lead up to a second floor. A frame shed was the most recent addition on the east side of the house, used to store hay. The north side of the property contains a family cemetery, where Henry and his wife, Rachel Povall, are buried there along with other family members.
