= Henry Clay's Law Office =

- U.S. National Register of Historic Places
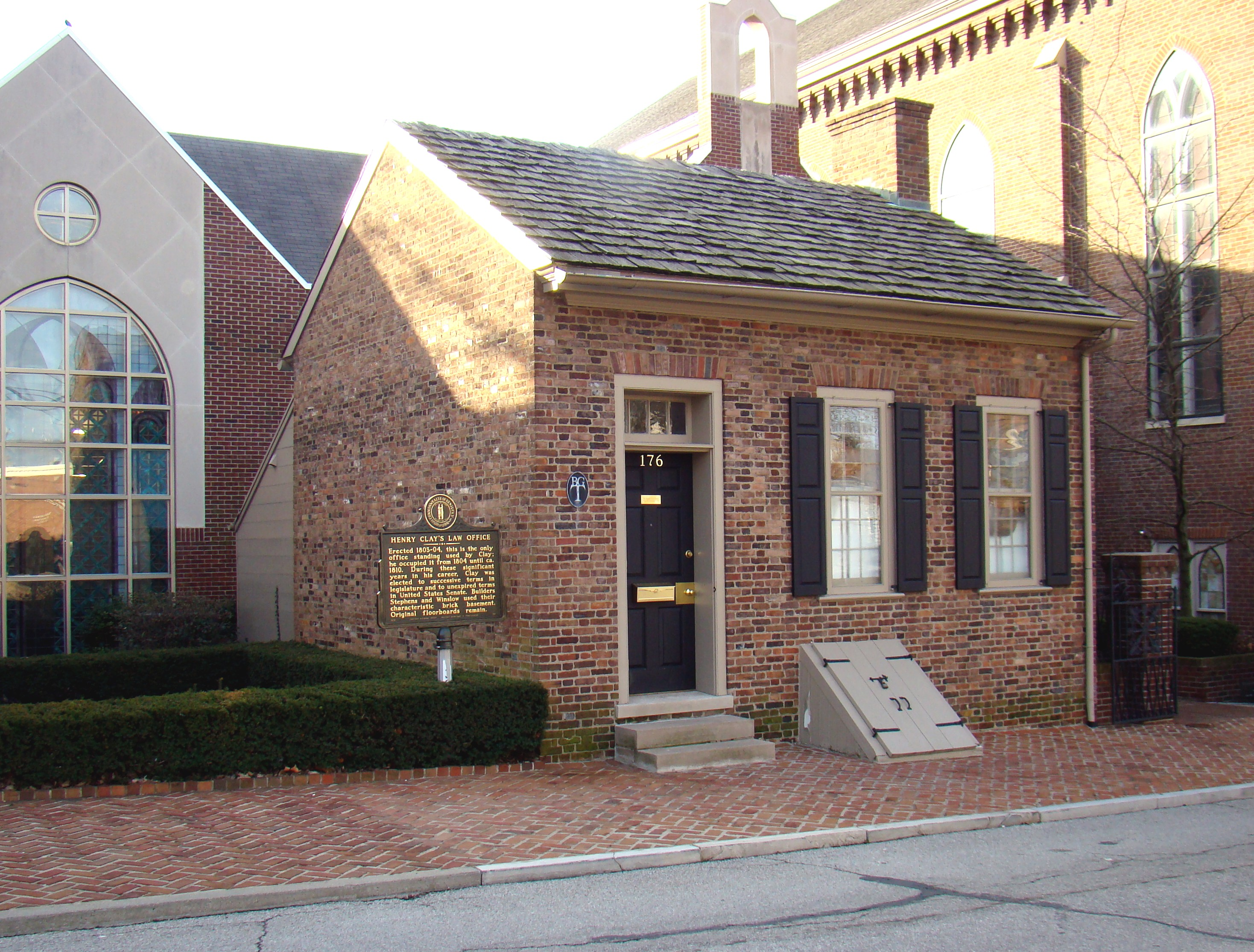
- Henry Clay's Law Office

- Location within Kentucky Location within the United States
- Location: 176 N. Mill St., Lexington, Kentucky
- Coordinates: 38°2′58.45″N 84°29′48.98″W
- Area: less than one acre
- Built: 1803
- NRHP reference No.: 71000340
- Added to NRHP: March 11, 1971

Henry Clay's Law Office was the law office of American statesman Henry Clay in Lexington, Kentucky from 1803 to 1810; it is one of the few professional buildings still standing from that time.

== Clay's law office ==
Clay received formal legal education at the College of William and Mary in Virginia, studying under George Wythe. Clay prepared for the bar by working with the Virginia attorney general, Robert Brooke, and he was admitted in 1797. As a young lawyer seeking to establish a successful law practice, Clay relocated to Lexington in November 1797. In 1803, Clay built and occupied the building located on Mill Street near his wife's family residence. The one-story brick structure measures a mere 20 by 22 feet. Clay occupied the office while serving in the Kentucky Legislature and in the United States Senate.

== After Clay ==
In 1830, the law office was incorporated into a larger building, and the original roof was removed.

The State of Kentucky purchased the building in 1969, and restoration was completed in 1971. The law office is now owned by the First Presbyterian Church.

== See also ==
- Ashland (Henry Clay estate)
- Dr. Henry Clay House
- National Register of Historic Places listings in Fayette County, Kentucky
