= Nathaniel Wolfe =

Kentucky lawyer and legislator

Member of the Kentucky House of Representatives from Louisville's 2nd district
- In office August 1, 1859 – August 3, 1863
- Preceded by: Thomas Shanks
- Succeeded by: R. A. Hamilton

Member of the Kentucky Senate from the 15th district
- In office August 1, 1853 – August 6, 1855
- Preceded by: William Preston
- Succeeded by: Charles Ripley

Commonwealth's Attorney for Jefferson County, Kentucky
- In office 1839 – July 1852

Personal details
- Born: October 29, 1810 Richmond, Virginia, U.S.
- Died: July 3, 1865 (aged 54) Louisville, Kentucky, U.S.
- Education: University of Virginia School of Law
- Occupation: Lawyer, legislator

Nathaniel Wolfe (October 29, 1810 – July 3, 1865) was an American lawyer and politician in Kentucky. A prominent Louisville attorney and Unionist during the American Civil War, he served as commonwealth's attorney for Jefferson County from 1839 to 1852 and represented Jefferson County in both the Kentucky Senate (1853–1855) and the Kentucky House of Representatives (1859–1863). Wolfe County, Kentucky, created in 1860, was named in his honor.

== Early life and education ==
Wolfe was born in Richmond, Virginia, into an established Jewish family active in the civic and communal life of the city. His father, Benjamin Wolfe, was an early member of several Virginia Masonic lodges beginning in the 1790s and later served on the Richmond Common Council. Other members of the Wolfe family, including Jacob Wolfe and Lewis Wolfe, are also recorded as members of Virginia lodges in the early nineteenth century.

Family accounts preserved by Wolfe's grandson, the lawyer and financier John Henry Hammond, state that Benjamin Wolfe served in the American Revolutionary War as an officer for George Washington and received a "sword for bravery" in recognition of his service. Contemporaneous newspapers identify him as Major Benjamin Wolfe, who served in the 19th Regiment of Militia. Hammond also repeated a family tradition that the Wolfe family descended from Major-General James Wolfe, the British officer killed at the Battle of the Plains of Abraham in 1759. Independent documentary confirmation of Benjamin Wolfe's Revolutionary War rank, commission, or receipt of such an award has not yet been identified in published military records.

In a letter dated December 18, 1824, Wolfe wrote directly to Thomas Jefferson expressing his intention to enroll at the University of Virginia the following year and inquiring about tuition, board, and required books. In the letter, he stated that he had revised Latin through Horace and Greek through the Graeca Minora, indicating advanced classical preparation.

In 1829, Nathaniel Wolfe was among the first two students to complete law courses and pass examinations at the University of Virginia School of Law. After completing his legal studies, he moved to Kentucky and established a law practice in Louisville.

== Career ==
Wolfe established a law practice in Louisville and became one of the city's leading attorneys in the mid-nineteenth century. He served as commonwealth's attorney for Jefferson County, Kentucky from 1839 to 1852. He later represented Jefferson County in the Kentucky Senate (1853–1855) and the Kentucky House of Representatives (1859–1863).

In the early 1850s, Wolfe was junior partner to James Guthrie in litigation arising from Strader v. Graham, a slavery case that reached the Supreme Court of the United States. The case addressed the legal status of enslaved persons who had traveled into free territory and formed part of the broader national controversy over slavery in the decade preceding Dred Scott v. Sandford.

In 1854, Wolfe served as defense counsel in the widely publicized Murder of William Butler case before the Hardin Circuit Court. The case arose from the fatal shooting of Professor William H. G. Butler and has been described as one of the earliest widely reported school-related shootings in the United States. The printed trial record lists Wolfe among the defense attorneys.

During the American Civil War, Wolfe was identified as a Unionist. As a legislator, he urged Kentucky to maintain neutrality until state elections could be held in August 1861. Like many Kentucky Unionists, however, he opposed federal emancipation policies and the enlistment of Black troops. In debate, he denounced President Abraham Lincoln as a "tyrant" and a "usurper" and objected to the arming of African Americans. Historians have described this position as characteristic of Kentucky's conservative Unionism, which opposed both secession and abolition while defending slavery and states' rights.

== Death and legacy ==
Wolfe died on July 3, 1865, in Louisville. Wolfe County, formed on March 5, 1860, from portions of Breathitt, Morgan, Owsley, and Powell Counties, was named in recognition of his public service. A historical marker commemorating Wolfe's life and burial site stands in Louisville, providing public recognition of his contributions to Kentucky's legal and political history.
