= Wolfe County High School =

Location
- 189 North Johnson Street; Campton, (Wolfe County), Kentucky 41301; United States

Information
- Type: Public high school
- School district: Wolfe County Schools
- Principal: Greg Creech
- Staff: 24.00 (FTE)
- Enrollment: 349 (2023-2024)
- Student to teacher ratio: 14.54
- Colors: Blue and white
- Nickname: Wolves

The Wolfe County High School is a high school in Campton, Kentucky, serving the Wolfe County School District of Wolfe County, Kentucky.

The current high school is located at 189 North Johnson Street. The school mascot is the Wolves.

== Historic building ==
- Wolfe County High School
- U.S. National Register of Historic Places
- Location within Kentucky Location within the United States
- Location: 166 Wolfe County Elementary School Road, Campton, Kentucky
- Coordinates: 37°44′03″N 83°33′05″W
- Area: 2 acres (0.81 ha)
- NRHP reference No.: 13000477
- Added to NRHP: June 20, 2013

Its historic Wolfe County High School building, built in Moderne style by the Works Progress Administration during 1937–1942, is prominently located on a hill overlooking Campton. It was formerly known as Campton High School, and was the only public high school in the county

This building served as high school until 1968, when it became a combination middle and elementary school. From 1991 to 2005 it served as Wolfe County Elementary School.

It is built of local sandstone. It is a three-story building with a 29-bay front facade.

It was built on the site of the former Kentucky Wesleyan Academy, which had been established in 1896 and operated until 1912.

The building was listed on the National Register of Historic Places in 2013.

Deemed contributing also is a one-story concrete block masonry building (c. 1942), contributing building) that served as a dining room in the past and later for shop classes. Non-contributing buildings on the property are a shed-roofed one-story classroom building and a storage shed.
