= List of power stations in Kentucky =

Sources of Kentucky utility-scale electricity generation in gigawatt-hours, full-year 2025:
1. Coal: 48,688 (66.0%)
2. Natural gas: 19,089 (25.9%)
3. Hydroelectric: 3,889 (5.27%)
4. Solar: 1,577 (2.14%)
5. Biomass: 405 (0.55%)
6. Petroleum: 76 (0.10%)
7. Other: 33 (0.04%)

This is a list of electricity-generating power stations in the U.S. state of Kentucky, sorted by type and name. In 2024, Kentucky had a total summer capacity of 18.4 GW through all of its power plants, and a net generation of 66,951 GWh. In 2025, the electrical energy generation mix was 66% coal, 25.9% natural gas, 5.3% hydroelectric, 2.1% solar, 0.6% biomass, 0.1% petroleum, and less than 0.1% other.

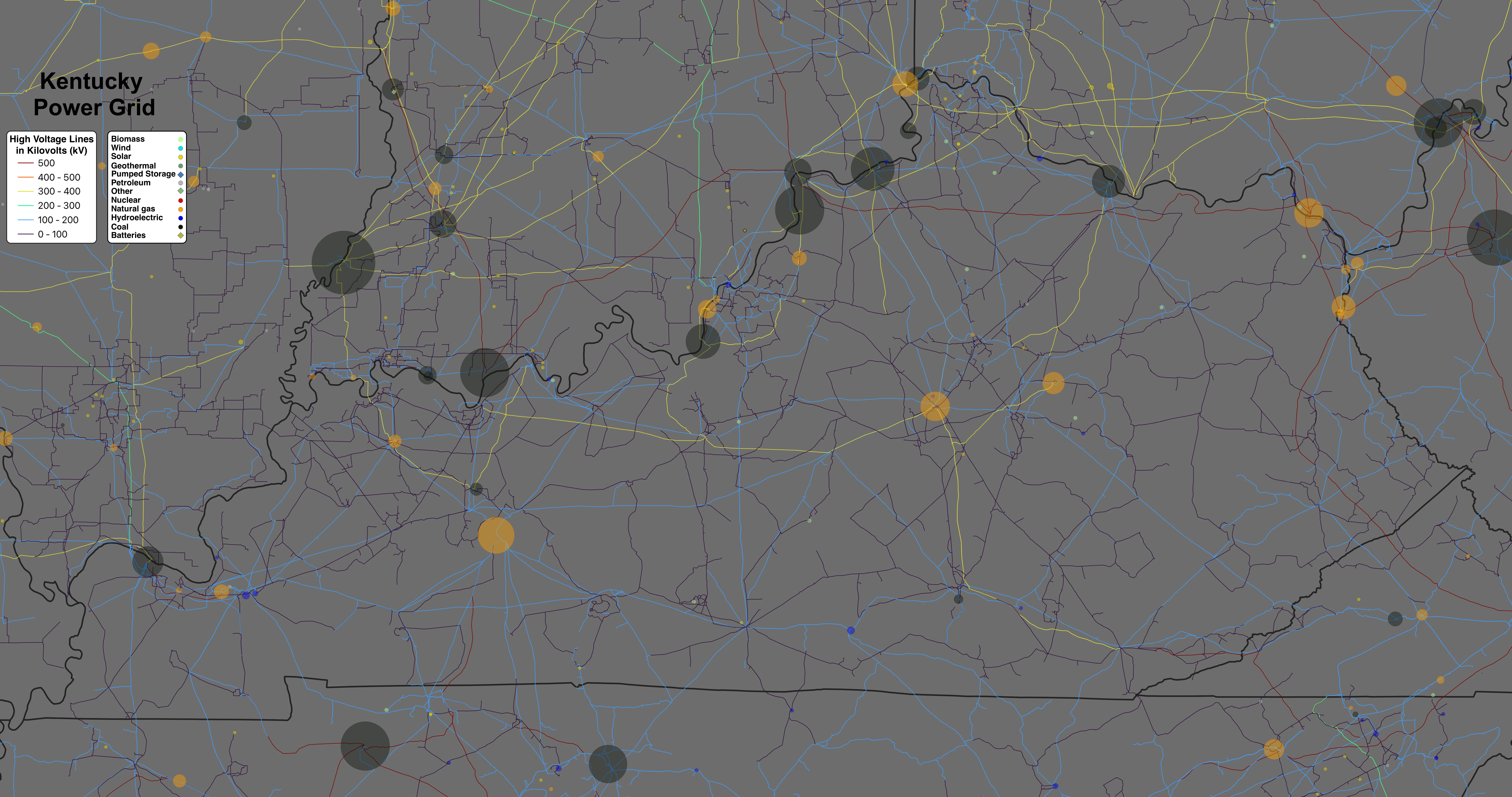
Kentucky power grid

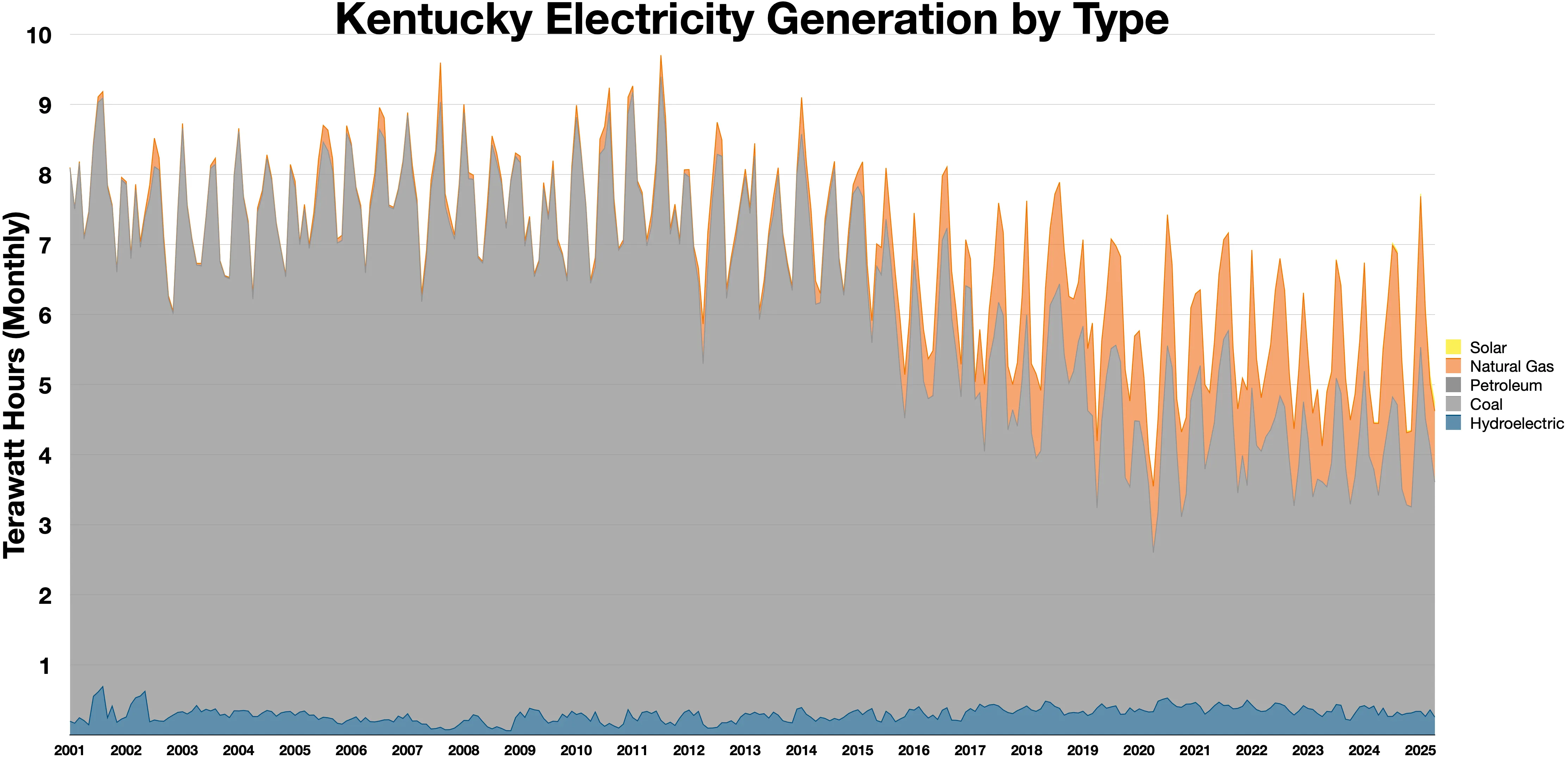
Kentucky electricity generation by type

== Fossil-fuel power stations ==
Lists include data from U.S. Energy Information Administration

=== Coal ===
Name	Location	Fuel	Capacity [MW]	Year opened	Status	Ref
D B Wilson Station	Ohio County	Coal	417	1984	Operational	
E.W. Brown Generating Station	Harrodsburg	Coal	464	1971	Operational	
East Bend Generating Station	Rabbit Hash	Coal	648	1981	Operational	
Elmer Smith Power Plant	Owensboro	Coal	425	1964/1974	Closed in 2020	
Ghent Generating Station	Ghent	Coal	1,932	1974/1977/ 1981/1984	Operational	
Hugh L. Spurlock Generating Station	Maysville	Bituminous coal^{[A]}	1,371	1977/1981/ 2005/2009	Operational	
John Sherman Cooper Power Station	Somerset	Bituminous coal	341	1965/1969	Operational	
Kenneth C Coleman	Hancock County	Coal	443	1969/1970/ 1971	Operational	
Mill Creek Generating Station	Louisville	Bituminous coal	1,465	1972/1974/ 1978/1982	Operational	
Paradise Fossil Plant	Muhlenberg County	Coal	971	1970	Converted to natural gas	
R D Green	Webster County	Coal	454	1979/1981	Operational, planned conversion to natural gas by June 2022	
Robert Reid Power Station	Webster County	Bituminous coal	96	1966	Operational	
Shawnee Fossil Plant	Paducah	Coal	1,750	1953/1954/1955	Operational	
Trimble County Generating Station	Bedford	Coal	1,274	1990/2011	Operational	
Tyrone Generating Station	Versailles	Bituminous coal	135	1947	Retired & demolished	
William C. Dale Power Station	Winchester	Bituminous coal	196	1954	Demolished	

^{A} Spurlock Station also supplements coal with up to 10% by-weight tire-derived fuel.

=== Natural gas ===
Name	Location	Fuel	Capacity [MW]	Year opened	Status	Ref
Big Sandy Power Plant	Louisa	Natural gas	300	1963	Operational	
Bluegrass Generating Station	Oldham County	Natural gas	501	2002	Operational	
Cane Run Generating Station	Louisville	Natural gas	640	2015	Operational	
E W Brown	Mercer County	Natural gas	980	1994-2001	Operational	
J K Smith	Clark County	Natural gas	1055	1991-2010	Operational	
Marshall Energy Facility	Marshall County	Natural gas	581	2002	Operational	
Paddy's Run	Jefferson County	Natural gas	182	1968/2001	Operational	
Paradise Combined Cycle Plant	Drakesboro	Natural gas	1,100	2017	Operational	
PPS Power Plant	McCracken County	Natural gas	110	2010	Operational	
Riverside Generating	Lawrence County	Natural gas	805	2001/2002	Operational	
Trimble County	Trimble County	Natural gas	954	2002/2004	Operational	

=== Petroleum ===
Name	Location	Fuel	Capacity [MW]	Year opened	Status	Ref
Paris	Bourbon County	Petroleum	11.9	1934-1974	Operational	

== Renewable power stations ==
Lists include data from U.S. Energy Information Administration

=== Biomass ===
Name	Location	Fuel	Capacity [MW]	Year opened	Status	Ref
Bavarian LFGTE	Boone County	Landfill gas	4.7	2003/2016	Operational	
Blue Ridge Generating	Estill County	Landfill gas	1.2	2013	Operational	
Cox Waste to Energy	Taylor County	Wood/wood waste	3.3	1995/2002	Operational	
Glasgow LFGTE	Barren County	Landfill gas	1.0	2015	Operational	
Green City Recovery	Scott County	Landfill gas	2.0	2016/2019	Operational	
Green Valley LFGTE	Greenup County	Landfill gas	2.4	2003	Operational	
Hardin County LFGTE	Hardin County	Landfill gas	2.4	2006	Operational	
Kentucky Mills	Hancock County	Wood/wood waste	49.0	2001	Operational	
Laurel Ridge LFGTE	Laurel County	Landfill gas	4.0	2003/2006	Operational	
Morehead Generating Facility	Rowan County	Landfill gas	1.4	2019	Operational	
Pendleton County LFGTE	Pendleton County	Landfill gas	3.2	2007	Operational	

=== Hydroelectric ===
Name	Location	Fuel	Capacity [MW]	Year opened	Status	Ref
Barkley Hydro	Lyon County	Hydroelectric	148.0	1966	Operational	
Cannelton Hydro	Hancock County	Hydroelectric	87.9	2016	Operational	
Dix Dam	Mercer County	Hydroelectric	31.5	1925	Operational	
Kentucky Dam	Marshall County	Hydroelectric	222.5	1944/1945/ 1948	Operational	
Laurel Dam	Laurel County	Hydroelectric	61.0	1977	Operational	
Meldahl Hydroelectric Facility	Foster	Hydroelectric	105	2016	Operational	
Mother Ann Lee	Mercer County	Hydroelectric	2.1	2007/2008	Operational	
Ohio Falls Station	Louisville	Hydroelectric	80	1928	Operational	
Smithland Hydroelectric Plant	Lyon County	Hydroelectric	75.9	2017	Operational	
Wolf Creek	Russell County	Hydroelectric	312	1951/1952	Operational	

=== Solar ===
Name	Location	Fuel	Capacity [MW]	Year opened	Status	Ref
Cooperative Solar One	Clark County	Photovoltaic	8.5	2017	Operational	
Crittenden Solar Facility	Grant County	Photovoltaic	2.7	2017	Operational	
E W Brown	Mercer County	Photovoltaic	10.0	2016	Operational	
L'Oreal Solar - Florence	Boone County	Photovoltaic	0.9	2017	Operational	
Walton Solar Facility (I&II)	Kenton County	Photovoltaic	2.0	2017	Operational	

=== Wind ===
Kentucky had no utility-scale wind farms in 2019.

== See also ==
- List of power stations in the United States
- List of power stations operated by the Tennessee Valley Authority

== Notes ==
- E.W. Brown also uses hydroelectric, natural gas, and solar energy.
