= Spurlock =

Spurlock may refer to:

== People ==
- Spurlock (surname)
- Cleo Spurlock Wallace (1914–1985), American speech therapist
- Edith Spurlock Sampson (1901–1979), American lawyer and judge

== Places ==
- Bear Creek (Red Bird River tributary), location of Spurlock post office
- Hugh L. Spurlock Generating Station, a power plant in Maysville, Kentucky
- Spurlock Museum, in Urbana, Illinois

== See also ==
- Spurlockville, West Virginia
- Harlan, Kentucky, whose post office was named Spurlock during the Civil War
