= E. W. Brown Generating Station =

Electric power plant facility in Kentucky, United States

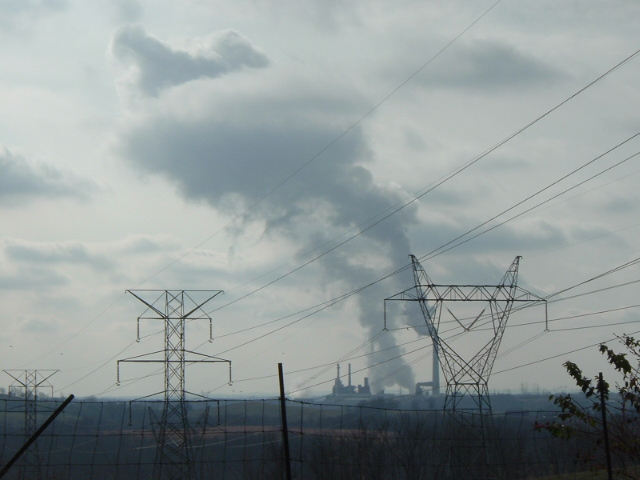
- E W Brown Generating Station viewed from KY 29
- Country: United States
- Location: Mercer County, near Harrodsburg, Kentucky
- Coordinates: 37.78°N 84.71°W
- Status: Operational
- Commission date: Unit 1: 1957; Unit 2: 1963; Unit 3: 1971; Solar facility: 2016
- Decommission date: Units 1–2: 2019
- Owner: Kentucky Utilities

Thermal power station
- Primary fuel: Bituminous coal
- Cooling source: Dix River

Power generation
- Nameplate capacity: 464 MW
- Capacity factor: 25.2% (solar)

The E. W. Brown Generating Station is a quad coal-fired power plant, natural gas power plant, solar power plant, and hydro electric plant owned and operated by Kentucky Utilities near Harrodsburg in Mercer County, Kentucky.

== Coal power ==
Brown has three coal-fired units: Unit 1 with a capacity of 107-megawatts (MW), Unit 2 with 168 MW, and Unit 3 with 413 MW. KU settled with the Environmental Protection Agency (EPA) in February 2009 for Unit 3 being under violation of the Clear Air Act. Under the settlement, KU had to install state-of-the-art pollution control technologies to reduce sulfur dioxide (SO_{2}) and nitrogen oxide (NO_{x}) emissions. In November 2017, it was announced by LG&E and KU Energy that Units 1 and 2 were shut down in February 2019. Stricter environmental rules and energy efficiency outweighed the cost of running the units.

== Solar energy ==
In 2014, the state Public Service Commission authorized the construction of a solar photovoltaic array at the E. W. Brown Generating Station. The array will be the first utility-scale solar project in the state, and will be capable of providing 10 MW of power alongside the fossil fuel based generators already operating onsite. The Kentucky chapter of the Sierra Club supported the solar project, but had concerns that the projected costs of the solar installation would become too high. The utilities operating the facility, the Sierra Club and the Kentucky Industrial Utilities Customers signed an agreement under which competitive bidding will be used on contracts to design and build the solar array. The solar array was unveiled in April 2016 and began operations the following June.

== Hydroelectricity ==
Hydroelectric power is powered by the nearby Dix Dam. The dam generates 33 MW.

== See also ==
- Coal mining in Kentucky
