= Herrington Lake =

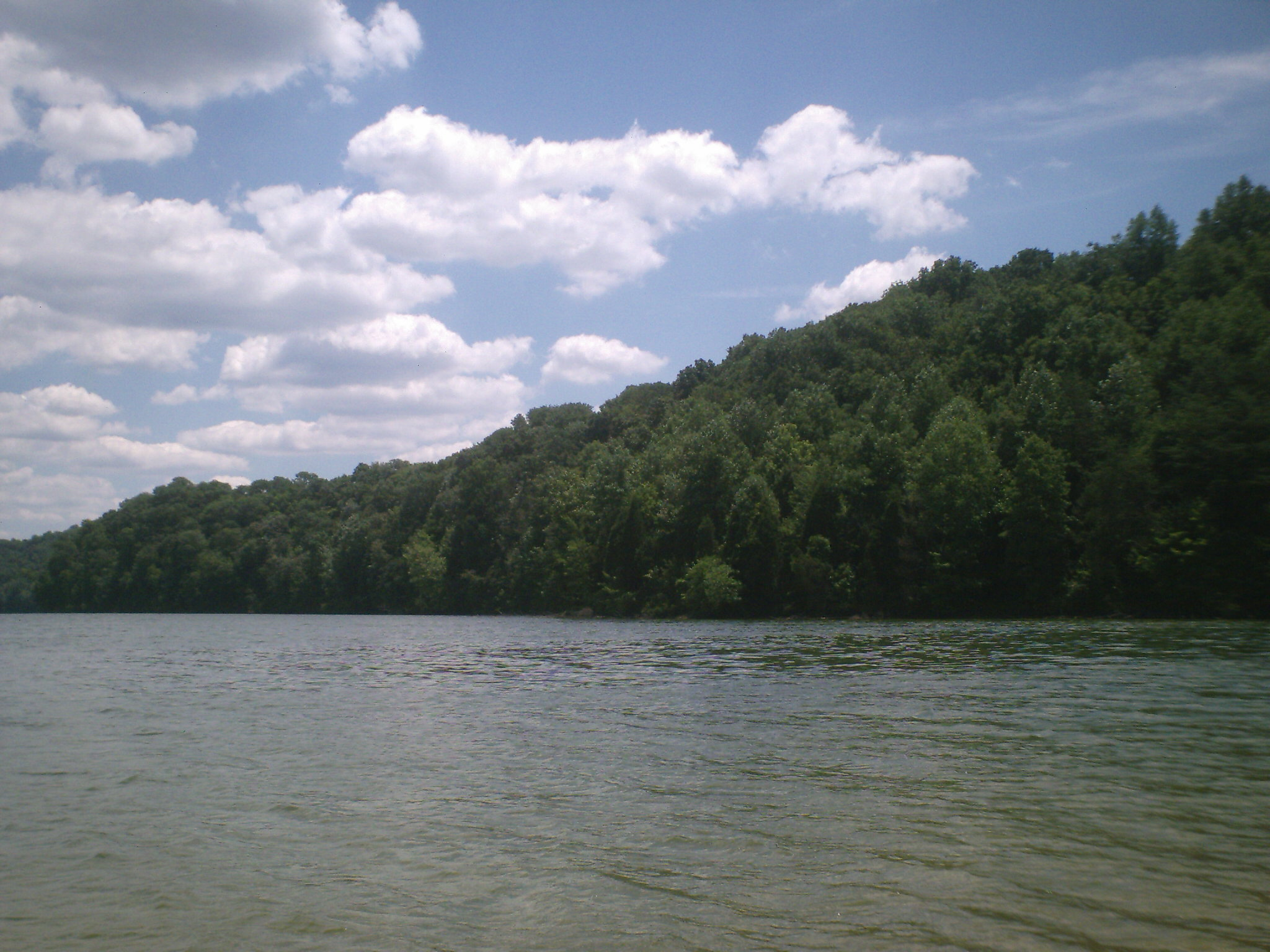

- Location within Kentucky
- Location: Garrard / Mercer / Boyle counties, Kentucky, US
- Coordinates: 37°44′12″N 84°42′15″W
- Type: artificial lake
- Basin countries: United States
- Surface area: 2,335 acres (9 km^{2})
- Max. depth: 249 ft (76 m)
- Surface elevation: 751 ft (229 m)

Herrington Lake is a 2,335-acre (9 km^{2}) artificial lake located in Mercer, Garrard and Boyle counties in Kentucky, United States. The lake was created by Kentucky Utilities' damming of the Dix River, a tributary of the Kentucky River, in 1925 to generate hydroelectric power. With a maximum depth of 249 feet (76 m), Herrington Lake is the deepest lake in Kentucky. A short distance below the dam, the Dix River enters the Kentucky River at High Bridge, Kentucky.

Herrington Lake contains many species of fish, including bluegill, catfish, crappie, hybrid striped bass, largemouth bass, spotted bass, and white bass.

Dix Dam, the dam that made the lake, was the largest earth-filled dam in the world at the time of its construction, and considered to be a major engineering feat. Kentucky Utilities' main dispatch and communication center is located on the site.
