= Ohio Falls Station =

- Country: United States
- Location: Louisville, Kentucky
- Coordinates: 38.20°N 85.87°W
- Commission date: 1927
- Owner: Louisville Gas & Electric

Power generation
- Units operational: 8
- Nameplate capacity: 80 MW

Ohio Falls Station is a hydroelectric power station owned by Louisville Gas & Electric (LG&E) and Kentucky Utilities (KU) which is located three miles west of Downtown Louisville, Kentucky. The generating station is located on Shippingport Island at the site of the McAlpine Dam and locks along the Ohio River in Kentucky. The plant was built in 1923 by Byllesby Engineering and Management Corporation and the U.S. Army Corps of Engineers. The plant featured eight 10.4 MW units operating at roughly 13,500 hp per unit. Each unit was composed of Allis-Chalmers turbines and General Electric generators. The plant is located inside the Ohio Natural Wildlife Conservation Area and is considered a large impoundment hydro power plant. The station was built after a canal and dam within the Ohio river in an attempt to allow boats to navigate the 8 ft vertical drop among the falls that spanned 2 miles wide. Production of the canal and dam began in 1825. It was not until a repair on the dam was needed that Louisville engineers had the idea of building a hydroelectric station to harvest the power of the falls.

== History ==
At first the U.S. Army Corps Engineers had deemed the falls an unsuitable site for a hydroelectric facility due to the inconsistent water levels of the river. The river's highs kept the water falling from the rapids and the river's lows did not provide flows strong enough to move a turbine. In 1912 a major of the Army corps revisited the research done and determined a hydro power plant was possible due to new technological developments. At its inception the Ohio Falls Plant generated enough energy to power the city of Louisville, but as the city grew the source became insufficient. The dam is run by the U.S. Army Corps Engineers who operate the navigation of the flow of the dam into the river. The U.S. Army Corps Engineers place priority in environmental conservation and controlling the water levels within the river. This limits the ability for the plant to optimize electricity production

== Power Plant Improvements ==
LG&E KU recently invested in a three phase plan to increase the production of the plant without damaging the ecosystem.

=== Phase 1 ===
Completed in 2002, this phase involved updating equipment technology so the plant could have automated and remote operation capabilities.

=== Phase 2 ===
Completed in 2004–05, this phase was focused on regulating waste that enters the dam and could damage the machines. This included adding "trash-rack cleaning machine, sluice gate and trash racks" to filter out trash that flows through the river into the dam.

=== Phase 3 ===
Completed in 2019, this phase included a final restoration of the units including, a "new runner, rewinding the generator, stator restack, converting rotating exciter to static excitation and (a) refurbishment of wicket gates." As part of the remodeling, a computer model was created to determine the optimal size and shape of the turbines to ensure maximum productivity from the plant. This allows the plant to operate at a wider distribution of water levels.

== Electrical Production ==
When in operation, water passes through the station to produce electricity. The water first passes through trash bars, which catch any large debris that might get caught in the turbine, then flows over blades connected to shafts, which, in turn spin the turbine, and thereby produce electricity. The eight generators in the facility produce roughly 101 MW of electricity.

The overall production capacity of the Ohio Falls plant is 101 MW. The average electricity usage for an American is 10,715 kWh per year, inserting the capacity of 101 MW into the following calculation: (((101000000MW/1000)kW*(24hours*365days))/10715kW), finds that the station is capable of providing power for 82,572 residents.

=== Costs of production ===
The levelized cost of energy (LCOE) for hydropower is $83.5/MWh. If the Ohio Falls Plant was to be rebuilt again in 2020 it would cost $58,516,800 to build and operate over its lifetime.

=== Comparing costs ===
All costs are $2013 /MWh for plants entering service in 2020

Plant Type	Levelized Capital Cost	Total LCOE
Conventional Coal	60.4	95.1
Wind	57.7	73.6
Solar Thermal	191.6	239.7
Hydro power	70.7	83.5

== See also ==
- Dix Dam
