= Ghent station =

Ghent station may refer to:

- Gent-Sint-Pieters railway station, the main railway station in Ghent, Belgium
  - Gent-Dampoort railway station, a smaller station in Ghent, Belgium
- Ghent (NYCRR station), a former railroad station in Ghent, New York
- Ghent Generating Station, a power plant in Kentucky, United States
