= Tyrone Generating Station =

- Country: United States
- Location: Woodford County, near Versailles, Kentucky
- Coordinates: 38.04°N 84.84°W
- Status: Demolished
- Commission date: 1947
- Decommission date: 2016
- Owner: Kentucky Utilities

Thermal power station
- Primary fuel: Bituminous coal
- Cooling source: Kentucky River

Power generation
- Units operational: 3
- Nameplate capacity: 135 MW

The Tyrone Generating Station was a coal-fired power plant owned and operated by Kentucky Utilities near Versailles, Kentucky. It is located 15 miles west of Lexington, Kentucky. It was retired in 2016 and demolished in 2019.

According to Kentucky Utilities, the plant's owner's website, it was retired in 2013.

== Emissions data ==
- CO_{2} emissions: 468,036 tons (2005)
- SO_{2} emissions: 3,192 tons (2005)
- SO_{2} emissions per MWh: 17.94 lb/MWh (2005)
- NO_{x} emissions: 955 tons (2005)
- Mercury emissions:

== See also ==
- Coal mining in Kentucky
