= Green station =

Green station may refer to:

- Green Street station, a MBTA Orange Line station in Boston signed as "Green".
- Robert D. Green Generating Station, Kentucky
