= PP&L =

PP&L may refer to:

- PPL Corporation, formerly Pennsylvania Power and Light
- Pacific Power & Light, the former name of PacifiCorp
