= Spurlock (surname) =

Spurlock is a surname. Notable people with the surname include:

- Delbert Spurlock (born 1941), American lawyer and government official
- Hugh L. Spurlock, namesake of the Hugh L. Spurlock Generating Station
- Isabella S. Davis Spurlock (1843–1906), American philanthropist
- Jeanne Spurlock (1921–1999), American psychiatrist, professor and author
- J. David Spurlock (born 1959), American author, illustrator, and editor, founder of Vanguard Productions
- Kirby Lee Spurlock (1893–1977), American college football player
- Micheal Spurlock (born 1983), American football coach and player
- Morgan Spurlock (1970–2024), American filmmaker
- James "Toofer" Spurlock, fictional TV series character, see list of 30 Rock characters
- William R. and Clarice V. Spurlock, namesakes of the Spurlock Museum
