= Coal mining in Kentucky =

Coal was discovered in Kentucky in 1750. Since the first commercial coal mine opened in 1820 coal has gained both economic importance and controversy regarding its environmental consequences. As of 2010 there were 442 operating coal mines in the state, and as of 2017 there were fewer than 4,000 underground coalminers.

== History ==
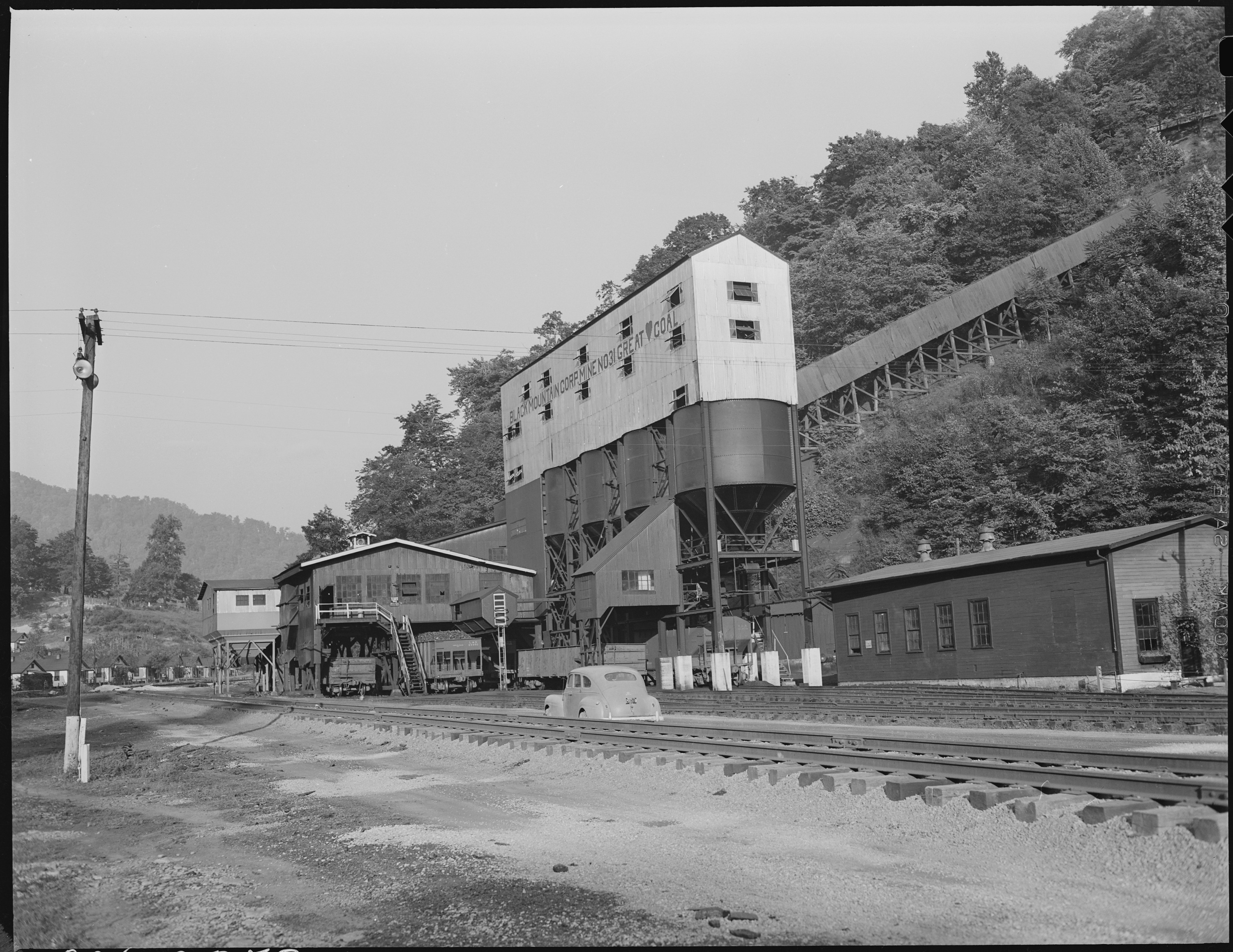
Tipple of Mine #31 in Kenvir during September 1946

Just two years after the first coal was discovered in the United States in 1750 explorer Thomas Walker discovered coal in what would become Kentucky and used it to heat his camp fire. Although his discovery came in the Eastern Coalfield it would be another 150 years before commercial coal production occurred there. In 1820 the first commercial coal mine in Kentucky opened in the Western Coalfield in Muhlenberg County. In its first year the mine produced 328 tons of coal. By 1843 the state produced 100,000 tons of coal, and by 1879 the state produced one million tons of coal, all coming from the Western Coalfield.

In 1879 the first commercial coal mine was opened in the Eastern Coalfield in the community of Bell County. Coal mining experienced rise and fall throughout most of the early to mid-20th century. The two World Wars made for periods of boom. The first was followed with a severe bust, brought on by the end of the Great War and then continued by the Great Depression. Following World War II, the drive toward mechanization and the Korean War pushed the industry even higher. However, railroads and households soon began shifting from coal to oil and gas for their energy needs, and the industry yet again experienced a downturn.

Diana Baldwin and Anita Cherry are believed to have been the first women to work inside an American coal mine, and were the first women to work inside a mine who were members of the United Mine Workers of America. They began that work in 1973 in Jenkins, Kentucky.

By 2001 8.36 billion tons of coal had been extracted from Kentucky, 5.78 billion tons coming from the Eastern Coalfield and 2.58 billion tons coming from the Western Coalfield. As of 2004 around 13% of total coal reserves had been extracted from the Western Coalfield, although much of the remaining 87% of reserves were not reachable with current technology. Around 19% of coal reserves had been extracted from the Eastern Coalfield.

Two phenomena have resulted in a major reduction in the number of mine workers and number of mines in Kentucky. First, increased mechanization in both Kentucky coal fields has reduced the need for labor. This has become even more pronounced with the emergence of strip mining. Secondly, acid rain regulation found in the 1990 Clean Air Act Amendment has made Kentucky coal, with its medium to high sulfur content, less desirable. That amendment requires companies to either remove the sulfur through scrubbers or switch to low-sulfur coal, found in western states like Wyoming, or submit to fines for their sulfur production.

While comparably higher in sulfur content, the Eastern Kentucky coal does have a higher carbon density than Wyoming coal, so less of it has to be burned to produce the same amount of electricity, thus producing less per capita carbon dioxide emissions. Eastern coal remains widely used across the United States.

The Western Coalfield has been hit much harder by acid rain regulations. Whereas about half of Eastern coal is high in sulfur content, nearly all Western coal falls into this category. In recent years the state government has been seeking to land so called "coal to gas" operations that convert coal into liquid fuels that closely resemble either natural gas or petroleum.

== Economic impact ==
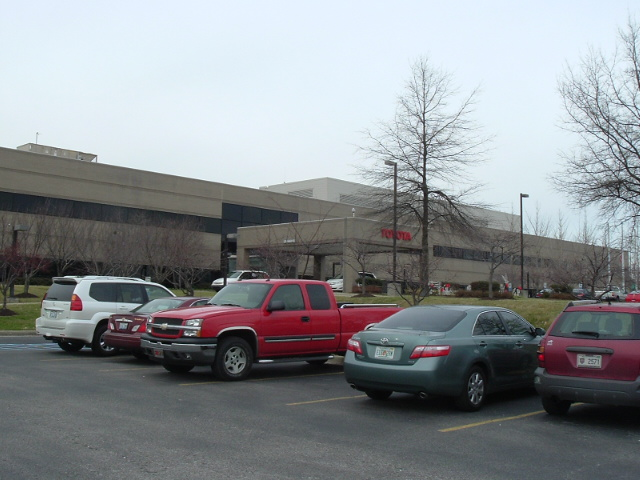
Kentucky's coal driven low electric rates help land major employers such as Toyota's assembly plant in Georgetown

Employment in the coal industry followed a steady decline from the 1980s up until the 2000s, evening out at around 18,000 for the past decade. As of 2009, 18,850 Kentuckians were directly employed in the coal industry, less than 1 percent of the total workforce. Yet, when accounting for jobs indirectly involved in the industry, that number becomes much larger, nearly 73,000. This number includes education and service industry jobs in mining communities, employment from construction, transportation and manufacturing work that touches the mining industry, as well as jobs stemming from banks, law offices and engineering firms that did business with the mining industry.

Coal's total economic impact is significant, with over 125.96 million tons of coal produced in 2006, making Kentucky 3rd in the nation for coal production. The state supplies 10.6% of the country with coal for power plants, giving it the nation's second-largest market share.

Arguably coal's biggest economic impact has been low electric rates in Kentucky, which gives the state a competitive advantage in attracting industry, including those with heavy energy demands such as aluminum smelters and automotive plants. This has also made Kentucky one of the largest consumers of energy per capita in the nation. The state's average retail price of electricity is 5.43 cents per kilowatt hour, the 3rd lowest rate in the nation. In 2004 coal-fired power plants produced approximately 92 percent of the electricity generated in Kentucky.

== Environmental impact ==
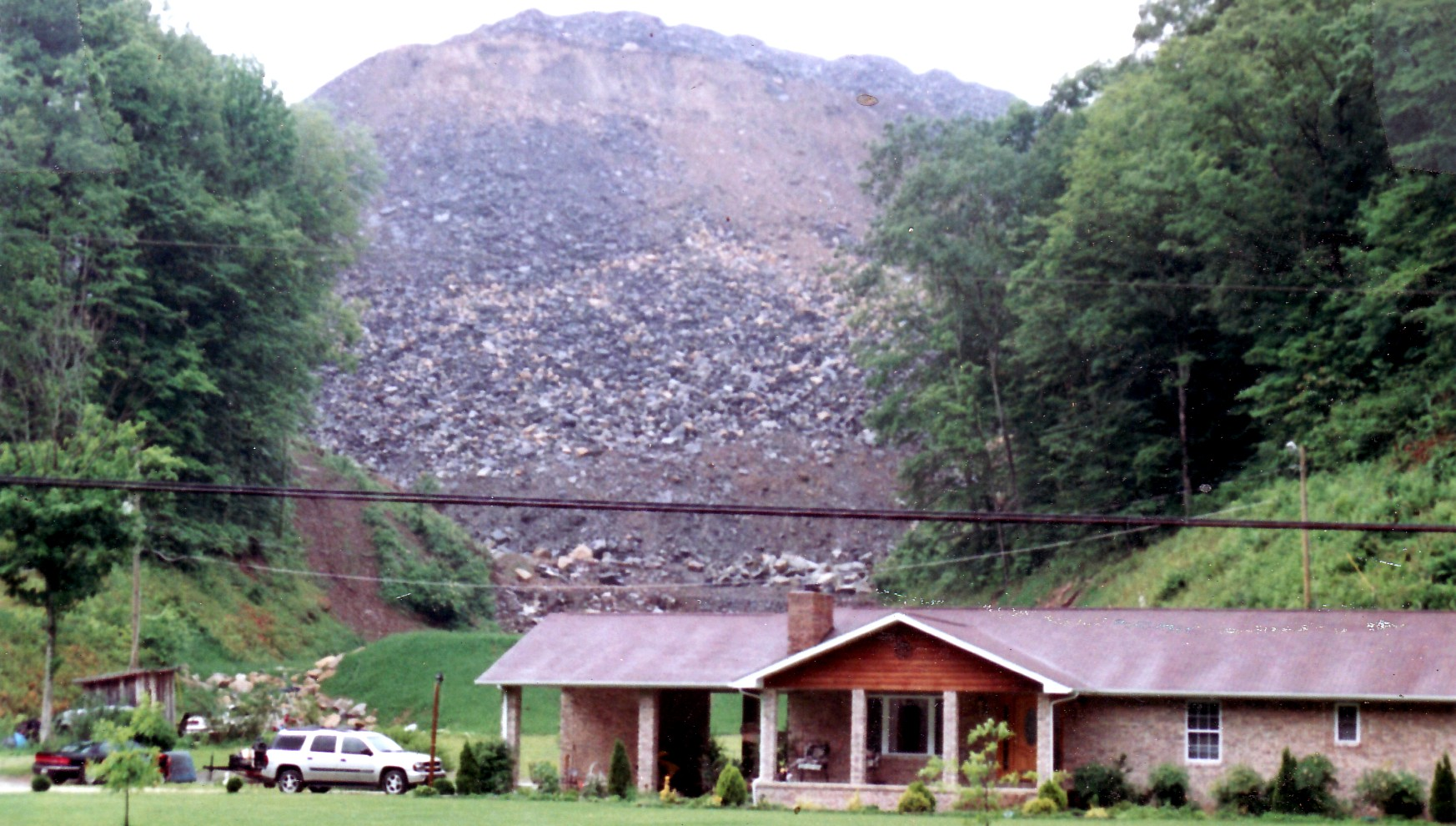
A strip mine in Martin County

Starting in the 1960s coal seams in both Kentucky coal fields have been increasingly accessed via a method known as Mountaintop Removal Mining, which is a form of surface mining that involves the topographical alteration and/or removal of a summit, summit ridge, or significant portion of a mountain, hill, or ridge in order to obtain a desired geologic material. The process involves blasting with explosives to remove up to 400 vertical feet (120 m) of overburden to expose underlying coal seams. Excess rock and soil laden with toxic mining byproducts are often dumped into nearby valleys, in what are called "hollow fills" or "valley fills."

This method allows, through the use of explosives and large machinery, more than two and a half times as much coal to be extracted per worker per hour than in traditional underground mines, thus greatly reducing the need for workers. In Kentucky, for example, the number of workers declined over 60% from 1979 to 2006 (from 47,190 to 17,959 workers). The industry overall lost approximately 10,000 jobs from 1990 to 1997, as MTR and other more mechanized underground mining methods became more widely used. The coal industry asserts that surface mining techniques, such as mountaintop removal, are safer for miners than sending miners underground.

Yet, the environmental implications of mountaintop removal have been widely accepted as a threat to Kentucky communities and ecosystems. Valley fills have been found to cause the permanent loss of critical ecosystems through water pollution and the burial of headwater streams. Furthermore, vegetation removal and soil compaction from mining equipment both contribute to stronger and more frequent flooding from storm runoff. As for human health in counties involved in mountaintop mining, there are elevated rates for mortality and lung cancer as well as chronic heart, lung and kidney disease. These threats do not appear to go away after mining has ceased nor after land reclamation has taken place.

=== Coal ash pollution ===
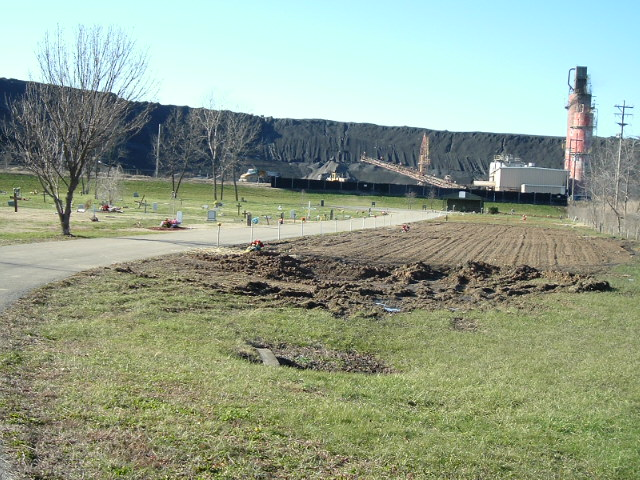
Mounds of coal ash located across the street from a residential neighborhood in Louisville

Ash is the waste product of coal that has been used to boil water. Typically it is stored in pills next to the power plant and then recycled through use in cement mixing. A problem is that the mounds of coal ash are rarely covered and easily become airborne. When coal is burned into fly ash the uranium and thorium in the unburned coal are concentrated at up to 10 times their original levels. Fly ash uranium sometimes leaches into the soil and water surrounding a coal plant, affecting cropland and, in turn, food. People living within a "stack shadow"—the area within a half- to one-mile (0.8- to 1.6-kilometer) radius of a coal plant's smokestacks—might then ingest small amounts of radiation. Fly ash is also disposed of in landfills and abandoned mines and quarries, posing a potential risk to people living around those areas.

=== Power plant emissions of CO_{2}, SO_{2}, mercury, and lead ===
In 2003, Kentucky emitted 143 million metric tons of carbon dioxide emissions, ranking it 13th in the nation overall.

Although not included in the tables below for each facility, another heavy metal pollutant emitted by coal-powered generators is lead (Pb). Lead is a powerful toxicant, negatively impacting human and animal health when ingested or inhaled, even in extremely small quantities. The newest generating unit at LG&E's Trimble County Station, TC2 (an 810 MW-gross coal combustion unit brought online in 2010) emits lead particulate matter at a rate of 499 kg/yr (approximately 1098 lb/yr, or to put into similar terms as used for human health, approximately 498 Billion micrograms). The current level set by the Centers for Disease Control and Prevention (CDC) for child lead blood levels requiring intervention is 5 micrograms per deciliter of blood. By comparison, the TC2 unit emits mercury emissions at a rate of 1.3*10^-6 lb/MWH. Assuming operation of TC2 24 hours per day for 364 days per year, the TC2 annual emission of mercury is approximately 86 pounds.

=== Rejuvenation efforts ===
Eastern Kentucky native, Dr. Patrick Angel initially spent most of his career within the Office of Surface Mining Reclamation and Enforcement instructing mining companies on how to fix land that was negatively affected by strip-mining and mountaintop removal mining. These efforts consisted of packing soil tightly together and planting grass, a plant which Angel says was the "only type of plant he trusted to hold the ground in place". In 2002, scientists like Dr. Angel started realizing that Appalachian forests destroyed by strip-mining weren't coming back, even with rejuvenation efforts. In Appalachia, a land mass larger than the state of Delaware should have been covered in trees, yet only held grass. After realizing this was an ecological disaster, Dr. Angel led efforts to plant more than 187 million trees which cover more than 275,000 acres of former mining land in Appalachia. Dr. Kathy Newfont, an Appalachian history professor at the University of Kentucky commented on Dr. Angel's efforts saying "...it was one of the most hopeful things I'd heard about the region in decades,".

== Human health impact ==
Health disparities become present when comparing Kentuckians that live near mountaintop coal mines and elsewhere. Mountaintop removal coal mining uses tools like explosives, machinery, etc. to remove large amounts of topsoil, exposing coal ores underneath. After topsoil is removed in the mining process, sulfur and other trace metals such as arsenic, lead, magnesium, etc. are exposed to the surrounding air which can last for decades. These uncovered trace metals do not just pollute the air, most notably surrounding waterways are highly affected by the pollution caused by mountaintop coal mining. These pollutants are hypothesized to be the culprits in causing higher than average levels of cancer, stroke, asthma, heart attacks, hypertension, and overall poor cardiovascular health in rural coal-mining communities. However, there are other hypotheses as to why this disparity is occurring. Socioeconomic barriers that Appalachian communities experience can play a large role in skewing the average rates of long-term illnesses. Mining communities used in a 2013 study found that on average, individuals living in coal-mining communities had a higher family history of cancer, habits of smoking, and had a lower median income compared to test subjects in non-mining communities.

== Impact from federal regulations ==
Electric utilities in Kentucky that use coal "are struggling to stay competitive by converting their power plants to other sources of fuel amid a downturn in the nation's coal industry and in response to stringent environmental regulations," according to Daily Energy Insider.

For example, the Louisville Gas & Electric Co. (LG&E) and the Kentucky Utilities Co. (KU) operated a coal-based power plant since 1954 known as Cane Run 7. In 2015, they turned the facility into a "natural gas combined generating station". It is the first of its type in the state of Kentucky. A coal-based power plant known as Big Sandy Unit 2 near Louisa, Kentucky, was shut down in 2015 due to environmental regulations. The company that owns Big Sandy Unit 2, American Electric Power, is converting the facility to natural gas.

In 2015, 87 percent of electricity in Kentucky was generated by a coal-based power plant; 7 percent of electricity came from a natural gas-powered plant. "More coal-fired power plants are expected to close in the next several years," Daily Energy Insider wrote.

The federal government proposed a new rule for regulating coal mining that would attempt to reconcile environmental protection with the reality that the U.S. needs coal for energy. The rule is controlled by a federal agency called the U.S. Office of Surface Mining Reclamation and Enforcement (OSMRE).

The rule is called the Stream Protection Rule (SPR). The Stream Protection Rule was proposed on July 16, 2015. The regulation would protect approximately 6,500 miles of streams across the United States for 2015. According to the Courier-Journal, the SPR has downsides: it could put "tens of thousands" of coal miners out of a job and increase the cost of electricity for Kentucky consumers. In Kentucky, both Democratic and Republican politicians have been critical of the regulation. The Republican governor and Democratic attorney general are both pushing back at the federal government against the rule. The text of the Stream Protection Rule is 2,300 pages in length.

== Differences between Western and Eastern Coalfields ==
Kentucky's two major coal fields are separated by around 180 miles. The Western Coal Fields are part of the Illinois Basin, which extends into Illinois and Indiana, while the Eastern Mountain Coal Fields is part of the Appalachian coal basin which extends from Pennsylvania to Alabama. Bituminous coal deposits in the eastern coal field are lower in sulfur content, averaging between 1 and 2 percent by weight. Coal deposits from the western part of the state are slightly lower in heat content but higher in sulfur, averaging between 3 and 4 percent sulfur. Concerns over acid rain have meant that Eastern coal has become preferable to Western coal.

== Coal mining in Kentucky politics ==
Both Republican Party and Democratic Party candidates in the 2011 gubernatorial election expressed their desire to maintain Kentucky coal. All three Republican primary candidates, David Williams, Bobbie Holsclaw, Phil Moffett, stated that they supported not only the Kentucky coal industry but also the practice of mountaintop removal. On the other side, incumbent Steve Beshear was outspoken in his criticism of federal intervention in Kentucky's coal industry, even joining the Kentucky Coal Association in a lawsuit against the U.S. Environmental Protection Agency over control of mining permits. Beshear's support of the state's coal industry brought criticism of the governor as being too lax on the issue. In February 2011, some even went so far as to take part in a four-day sit-in protest in the governor's outer office. Following the sit-in, hundreds of others gathered outside the state capitol to promote mountaintop removal legislation.

== Coal extraction and remaining reserves by county ==
=== Western Coalfield ===
County	Millions of tons of coal extracted	Millions of tons of coal remaining
Butler County	30.2	353.29
Daviess County	62.33	1205.66
Henderson County	76.12	6700.53
Hopkins County	781.80	7251.20
McLean County	19.73	3536.95
Muhlenberg County	749.83	3224.18
Ohio County	266.72	1291.11
Union County	332.21	5842.56
Webster County	317.11	5688.73

=== Eastern Coalfield ===
County	Millions of tons of coal extracted	Millions of tons of coal remaining
Bell County	302.69	2589.32
Boyd County	19.93	590.82
Breathitt County	208.47	3695.26
Carter County	18.61	464.74
Clay County	61.87	1412.37
Elliott County	9.87	296.58
Floyd County	459.68	3248.72
Greenup County	10.42	184.03
Harlan County	917.66	6045.80
Jackson County	11.31	353.25
Johnson County	97.56	1224.32
Knott County	329.90	3725.30
Knox County	75.51	1230.91
Laurel County	35.95	336.14
Lawrence County	26.81	1971.06
Lee County	8.49	347.00
Leslie County	259.17	3036.31
Letcher County	558.17	2576.46
McCreary County	55.34	334.29
Magoffin County	55.77	1857.56
Martin County	391.28	2537.41
Morgan County	15.22	818.96
Owsley County	10.02	554.10
Perry County	593.36	2409.98
Pike County	1420.07	8551.56
Whitley County	91.40	804.64
Wolfe County	7.16	429.60

== List of coal-fired power plants in Kentucky ==
Name	Location	MW Capacity	Annual CO2 emissions	Annual SO2 emissions	Annual NOx emissions	Annual Mercury emissions
Kenneth C. Coleman Generating Station	Hawesville	521	3,404,057 tons	10,899 tons	5,320 tons	110 pounds
John Sherman Cooper Power Station	Somerset	341	1,931,758 tons			
William C. Dale Power Station	Winchester	195	1,186,544 tons			
E. W. Brown Generating Station	Harrodsburg	739	3,978,892 tons	45,191 tons	6,683 tons	161 pounds
East Bend Generating Station	Florence	669	4,671,336 tons	3,947 tons	5,400 tons	86 pounds
Elmer Smith Power Plant	Owensboro	445	2,846,615 tons	2,525 tons	7,045 tons	59 pounds
Ghent Generating Station	Warsaw	2,000	12,933,318 tons	49,913 tons	14,318 tons	413 pounds
Robert D. Green Generating Station	Central City	528	3,923,035 tons			
Henderson Station I (Replaced)	Henderson	365	2,467,124 tons			
Henderson Station II (Sebree Station)	Henderson	405				
Mill Creek Generating Station	Louisville	1,717	10,089,535 tons	25,464 tons	12,594 tons	361 pounds
Paradise Fossil Plant	Central City	2,558	15,497,610 tons	83,926 tons	43,022 tons	490 pounds
Robert Reid Power Station	Central City	96	438,984 tons	9,280 tons	1,097 tons	
Shawnee Fossil Plant	Paducah	1,750	10,527,302 tons	35,815 tons	18,216 tons	180 pounds
Hugh L. Spurlock Generating Station	Maysville	1,346	8,105,061 tons	38,877 tons	8,125 tons	300 pounds
Trimble County Generating Station	Bedford	514	4,107,397 tons	830 tons	3,981 tons	203 pounds
D.B. Wilson Generating Station	Wickliffe	440	3,758,819 tons	9,306 tons	5,773 tons	131 pounds
TOTAL	N/A	14,224	89,867,387	≥315,973	≥131,574	≥2494

== See also ==
- Martin County sludge spill
- Fly ash
- John C. C. Mayo
- Coal mining disasters in Kentucky
