= Robert D. Green Generating Station =

- Country: United States
- Location: Webster County, near Sebree, Kentucky; also near Robards, Kentucky
- Coordinates: 37.64°N 87.50°W
- Commission date: 1979
- Owner: Big Rivers Electric Cooperation

Thermal power station
- Primary fuel: Bituminous coal
- Cooling source: Green River

Power generation
- Units operational: 2
- Nameplate capacity: 528 MW

The Robert D. Green Generating Station is a coal-fired power plant owned and operated by the Big Rivers Electric Cooperation as part of Sebree Station. It is located in the northeast corner of Webster County, Kentucky. It will convert to natural gas in March 2022 sourced from Czar's Pipeline.

== Emissions data ==
- 2006 CO_{2} Emissions: 3,923,035 tons
- 2006 SO2 Emissions:
- 2006 NOx Emissions:
- 2005 Mercury Emissions:

== See also ==
- Coal mining in Kentucky
