= D.B. Wilson Generating Station =

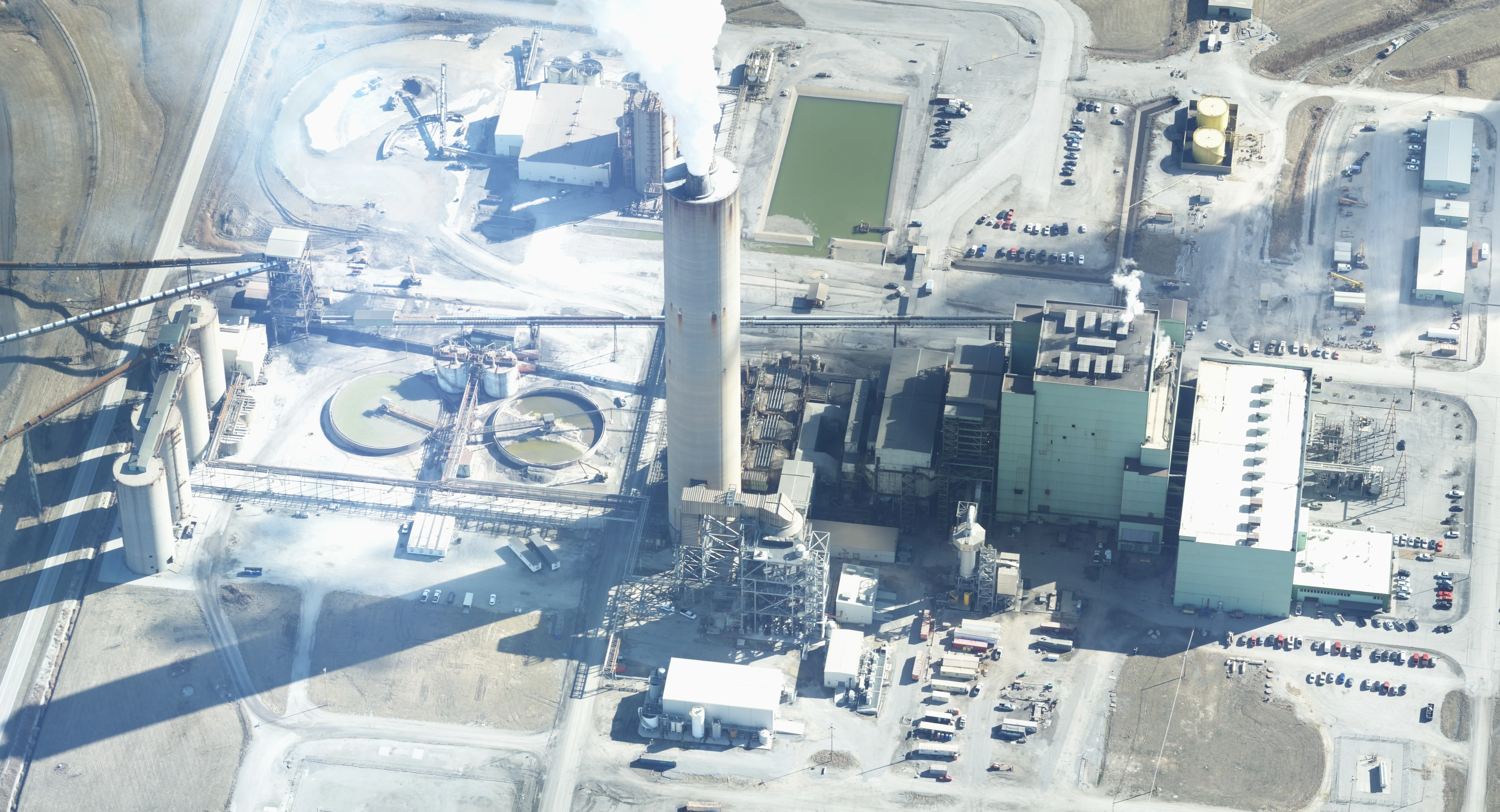
- Country: United States
- Location: Ohio County, near Centertown, Kentucky
- Coordinates: 37.45°N 87.08°W
- Commission date: 1984
- Owner: Big Rivers Electric Corporation

Thermal power station
- Primary fuel: Bituminous coal

Power generation
- Units operational: 1
- Nameplate capacity: 450MW

The D.B. Wilson Generating Station is a coal-fired power plant operated by Big Rivers Electric Corporation and located near Centertown, Kentucky.

== See also ==
- Coal mining in Kentucky
