= Kenneth C. Coleman Generating Station =

Coleman Station
- Country: United States
- Location: Hancock County, near Hawesville, Kentucky
- Coordinates: 37.9625°N 86.7917°W
- Status: Decommissioned
- Commission date: 281 MW (1963); 816 MW (1969)
- Decommission date: September 2020
- Owner: Big Rivers Electric Corporation

Thermal power station
- Primary fuel: Bituminous coal
- Cooling source: Ohio River

Power generation
- Nameplate capacity: 521 MW

The Kenneth C. Coleman Generating Station was a coal-fired power plant owned and operated by Big Rivers Electric Corporation near Hawesville, Kentucky.

== Plant Data ==
- Owner: Big Rivers Electric Corporation
- Plant Nameplate Capacity: 521 MW (Megawatts)
- Units and In-Service Dates: 174 MW (1969), 174 MW (1970), 173 MW (1971)
- Location: 4982 River Rd., Hawesville, KY 42348
- GPS Coordinates: 37.9625, -86.791667
- Coal Consumption:
- Coal Source:
- Number of Employees:

== Emissions Data ==
- 2006 CO_{2} Emissions: 3,404,057 tons
- 2006 SO_{2} Emissions: 10,899 tons
- 2006 SO_{2} Emissions per MWh:
- 2006 NO_{x} Emissions: 5,320 tons
- 2005 Mercury Emissions: 110 lb.

== See also ==
- Coal mining in Kentucky
