= PPL Building =

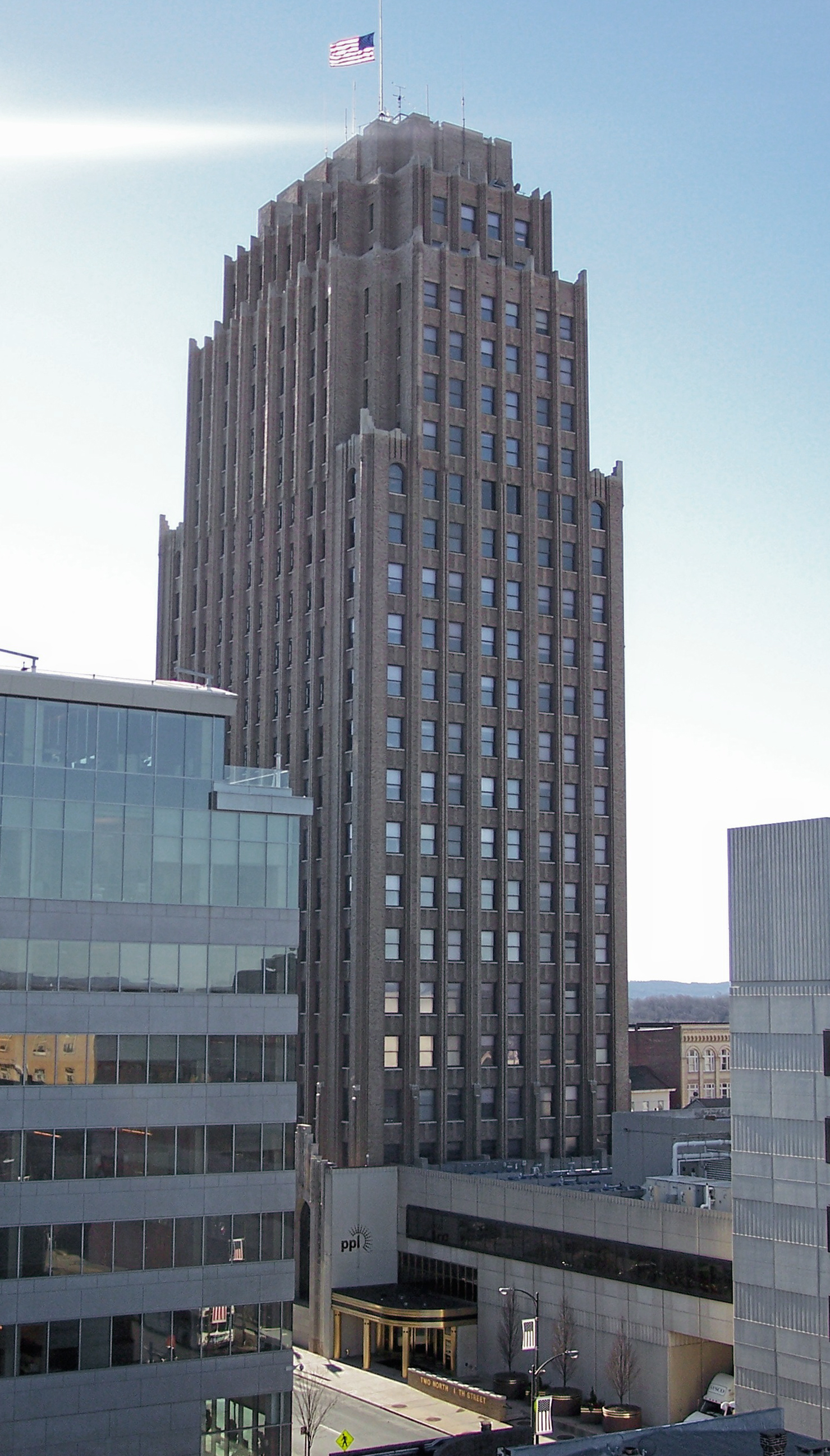
- PPL Building in January 2007
- Interactive map of the PPL Building area
- Alternative names: Pennsylvania Power and Light Building

General information
- Status: Completed
- Type: Commercial offices
- Architectural style: Art Deco / Art Moderne
- Location: 2 North 9th Street; Allentown, Pennsylvania
- Coordinates: 40.6014°N 75.4758°W
- Construction started: 1926
- Completed: 1928

Height
- Roof: 321.6 ft (98.0 m)

Technical details
- Floor count: 24
- Floor area: 19,094 m^{2} (205,530 sq ft)
- Lifts/elevators: 6

Design and construction
- Architects: Helmle, Corbett & Harrison

The PPL Building, formerly the Pennsylvania Power and Light Building, is a 24-story office building in Allentown, Pennsylvania. At 321.6 ft (98.0 m) in height, it is the tallest building in the city and the surrounding Lehigh Valley metropolitan area. The building is the headquarters for PPL Corporation, the main electricity provider for the Lehigh Valley, Northeastern Pennsylvania, and other regions of Pennsylvania and the United States.

The PPL Building is often uniquely illuminated at night, especially during the Christmas season, with a candle on one face of the building, and a Christmas tree on the other.

== History ==
The PPL Building was built between 1926 and 1928 by Pennsylvania Power & Light, forerunner of PPL, and to this day has been the headquarters of the company. The building was designed by architect and skyscraper pioneer Harvey Wiley Corbett, who would later have a hand in designing New York City's Rockefeller Center and other prominent buildings. The building exterior features bas reliefs by Alexander Archipenko.

In 1930, the PPL Building was named the "best example of a modern office building" by Encyclopædia Britannica, and also featured the world's fastest elevator.

During the 1960s, PPL supported the local United Fund community fund drive program by using the building's brightly lit windows at night to spell out the abbreviation "U.F." to remind area residents to contribute to the fund drive.

In June of 2023, PPL Corporation announced plans to vacate the building and put it up for sale. In early 2024, the building was sold for $9 million to a Luzerne County, Pennsylvania-based realtor, which plans to convert it into commercial spaces, apartments, and other amenities.

== In popular culture ==
Exterior shots of the PPL Building appear in Executive Suite, a 1954 film.
