= McMullin-Warren House =

Historic house in Kentucky, United States

- McMullin--Warren House
- U.S. National Register of Historic Places
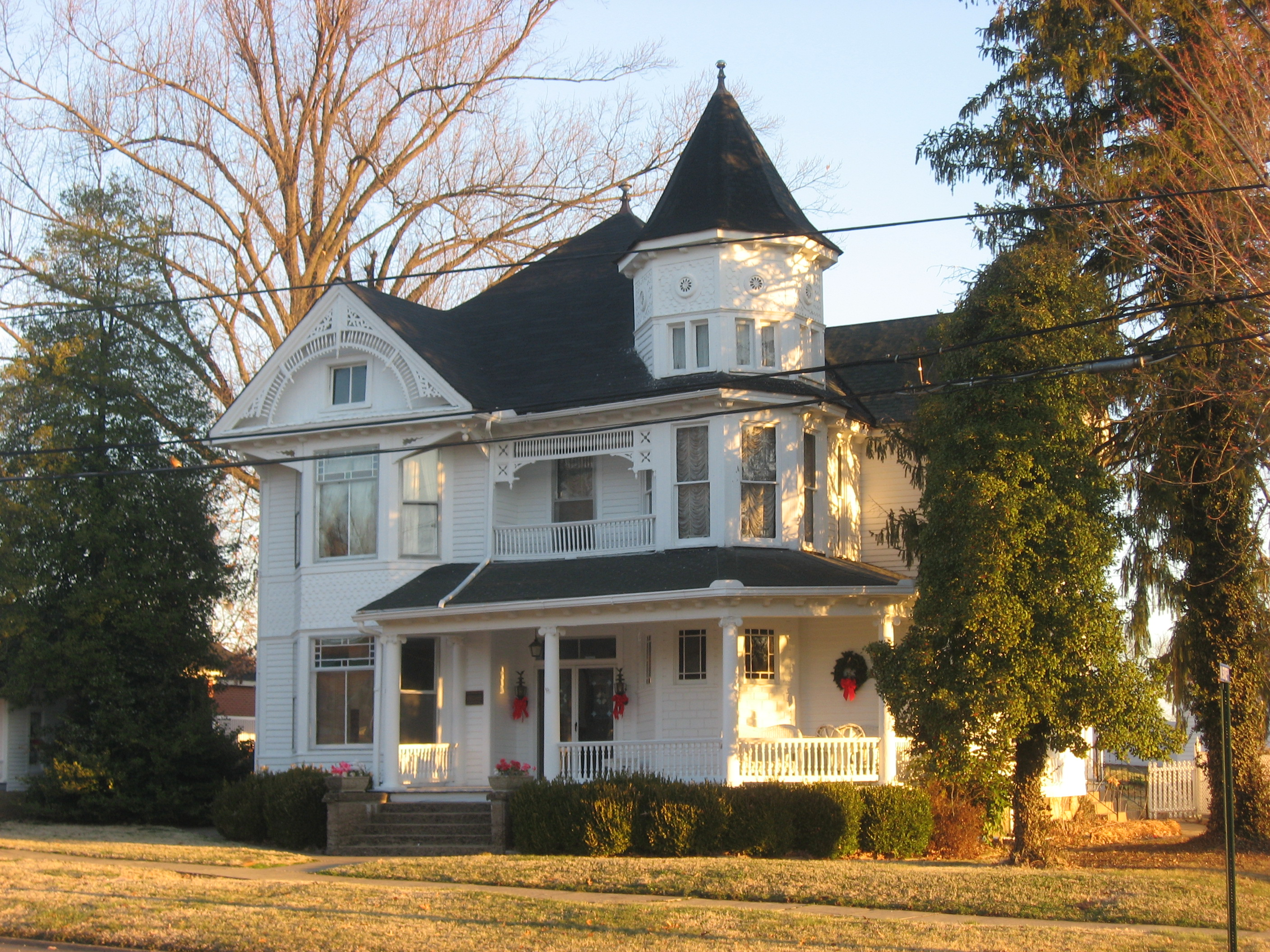

- Location within Kentucky Location within the United States
- Location: 6959 Main St., Sebree, Kentucky
- Coordinates: 37°36′25″N 87°31′24″W
- Area: less than one acre
- Built: 1901
- Built by: McMullin, David W.
- Architectural style: Queen Anne
- NRHP reference No.: 88000185
- Added to NRHP: March 8, 1988

The McMullin-Warren House, at 6959 Main St. in Sebree, Kentucky, is a Queen Anne-style house built in 1901. It was listed on the National Register of Historic Places in 1988.

It was deemed notable as "the most distinctive architectural landmark in Sebree."
