= Robert Reid Power Station =

Power plant in Webster County, Kentucky

- Country: United States
- Location: Webster County, near Sebree, Kentucky (also near Robards, Kentucky)
- Coordinates: 37°38′43″N 87°30′10″W
- Commission date: 1966
- Owner: Big Rivers Electric Cooperation

Thermal power station
- Primary fuel: Bituminous coal
- Cooling source: Green River

Power generation
- Units operational: 1
- Nameplate capacity: 96 MW

Robert Reid Power Plant is a coal-fired power plant owned and operated by the Big Rivers Electric Cooperation as part of Sebree Station. It is located in the northeast corner Webster County, Kentucky (just south of the Anaconda Aluminum plant in Henderson County). The plant obtains much of its fuel from coal mines located within just a few miles of the plant itself.

== Emissions Data ==
- CO_{2} Emissions: 438,984 tons (2005)
- SO_{2} Emissions: 9,280 tons (2005)
- SO_{2} Emissions per MWh: 60.37 lb/MWh
- NO_{x} Emissions: 1,097 tons (2005)

== See also ==
- Coal mining in Kentucky
