= Shawnee Fossil Plant =

Coal-fired power plant in McCracken County, Kentucky, United States

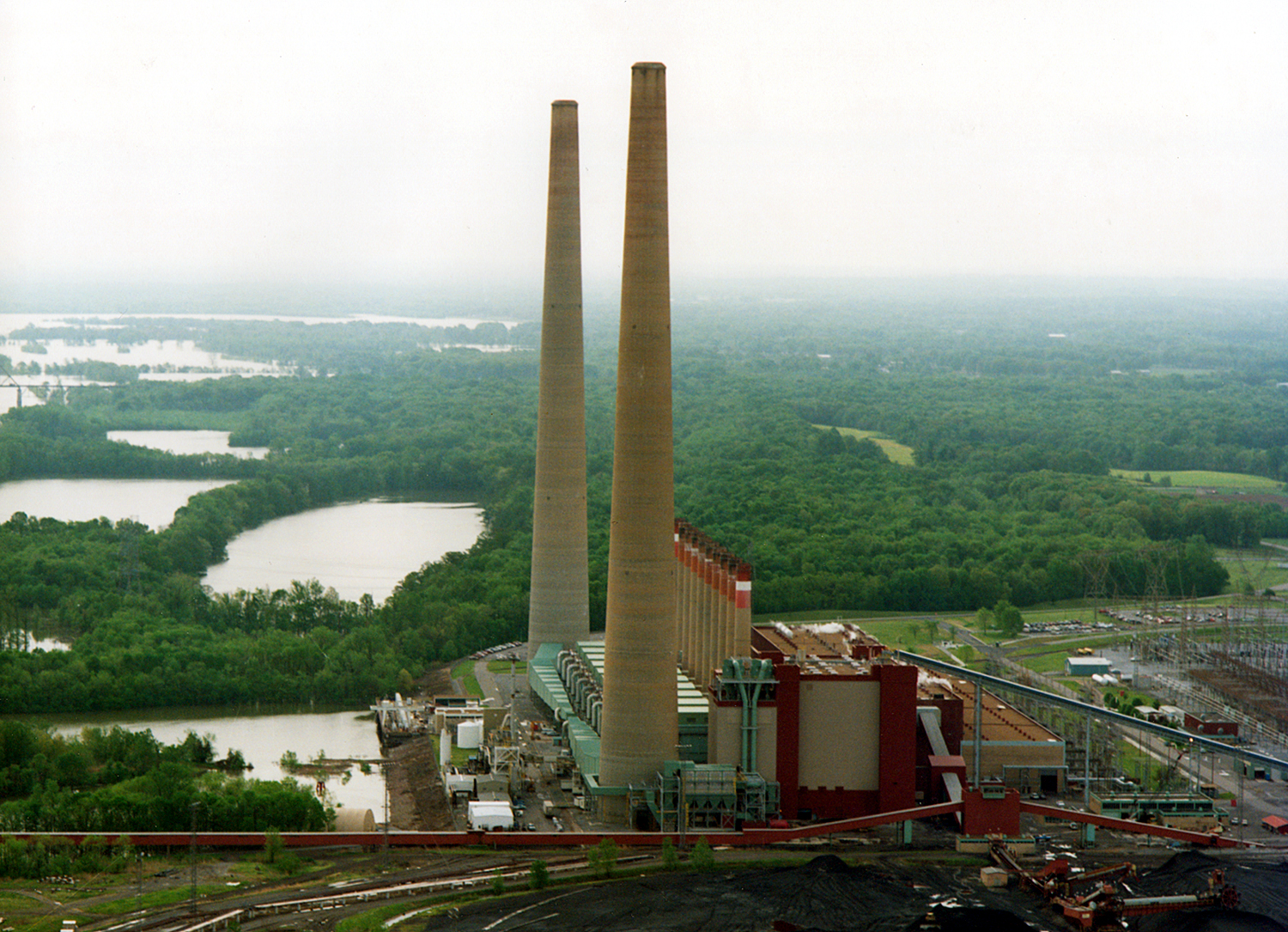
- Shawnee Fossil Plant
- Country: United States
- Location: McCracken County, near Paducah, Kentucky
- Coordinates: 37.15°N 88.77°W
- Commission date: Unit 1 - April 9, 1953; Unit 2 - June 21, 1953; Unit 3 - October 1953; Unit 4 - January 8, 1954; Unit 5 - October 1, 1954; Unit 6 - November 1, 1954; Unit 7 - December 23, 1954; Unit 9 - July 19, 1955
- Decommission date: Unit 10 - June 30, 2014
- Owner: TVA

Thermal power station
- Primary fuel: Bituminous coal
- Cooling source: Ohio River

Power generation
- Units operational: 9
- Nameplate capacity: 1,750 MW
- Annual net output: 8 billion kilowatt-hours

External links
- Website: www.tva.com/sites/shawnee.htm
- Commons: Related media on Commons

The Shawnee Fossil Plant is a coal-fired power plant owned and operated by the Tennessee Valley Authority, located near Paducah, Kentucky. The closest city is Metropolis, Illinois, across the Ohio River to the northeast. The Shawnee Fossil Plant was created with the intentions of providing sufficient electricity to the national defense industry escalating demand for power which could not be met with the Commonwealth of Kentucky's then-current infrastructure. The plant also provided economic growth to the area in the post-WWII era creating jobs and a stronger infrastructure to support future state developments.

== Operation ==
Shawnee Fossil Plant contains nine active units, which are drum-type, front wall fired pulverized coal units. These units are coal powered and operate by using a boiler to heat water. This heated water in turn creates highly pressurized steam into a turbine to then power the generator.

== History ==
Construction began on the Shawnee Fossil Plant in January 1951. The plant's first unit began operation on April 9, 1953. In October 1956, the last of the ten units began operation. At the time of its completion, it was the second-largest coal-fired plant in the nation, behind TVA's Kingston Fossil Plant in Harriman, Tennessee, and was estimated to be the second-largest coal-fired plant in the world. Shawnee is currently the oldest TVA coal-fired power plant still in operation.

Unit 10, which was converted to an atmospheric fluidized-bed boiler in the early 1980s was idled in October 2010 and retired on June 30, 2014. That unit's generator was moved to TVA's Kingston Fossil Plant late that year, where it replaced a generator that had failed. In total the Shawnee Fossil Plant currently produces enough electricity to power roughly 530,000 homes yearly.

== Environmental consequences ==
The Shawnee Fossil Plant has significant consequences on the surrounding environment as their emissions travel through the local ecosystem. Through the analyzation of groundwater monitoring wells surrounding the plant excessive amounts of cobalt, chromium, lead, sulfate, strontium, nickel, manganese, boron, and beryllium were found with toxic levels well above the Environmental Protection Agency's regulations in 16 out of the 19 groundwater monitoring wells. Overall the Shawnee Fossil Plant disposes of ash within a 300-acre area which includes groundwater access locations polluting the local ecosystem. With Unit 10 already decommissioned on June 30, 2014, the president of the Tennessee Valley Authority, Jeff Lyash, announced plans to close the TVA's coal fleet (including the Shawnee Fossil Plant) by 2035 with hopes of transitions to cleaner energy solutions making less of an impact on the surrounding environment. This decision was later reversed under the Trump administration, and TVA will continue to invest in coal power.

Toxic Emission Data (c.2015)
Chemical	Air	Water	Land	Off-Site Disposal	Total
Hydrochloric Acid	87,000 lb	0 lb	0 lb	0 lb	87,000 lb
Hydrogen Fluoride	200,000 lb	0 lb	0 lb	0 lb	200,000 lb
Sulfuric Acid	5,000 lb	0 lb	0 lb	0 lb	5,000 lb
Barium Compounds	3,150 lb	0 lb	2,050,000 lb	32 lb	2,053,182 lb
Chromium Compounds	232 lb	0 lb	24,900 lb	2 lb	25,134 lb
Copper Compounds	283 lb	4,900 lb	62,400 lb	0 lb	67,583 lb
Lead Compounds	171 lb	0 lb	18,100 lb	2 lb	18,273 lb
Manganese Compounds	423 lb	26 lb	79,000 lb	0 lb	79,449 lb
Mercury Compounds	120 lb	0 lb	214 lb	0 lb	334 lb
Thallium Compounds	18 lb	0 lb	26,200 lb	0 lb	26,218 lb
Vanadium Compounds	273 lb	43 lb	68,000 lb	0 lb	68,316 lb
Zinc Compounds	1,904 lb	1,100 lb	40,800 lb	0 lb	43,804 lb
Naphthalene	21 lb	0 lb	0 lb	0 lb	21 lb
Dioxin	1 gm	0 lb	0 lb	0 lb	1 gm
Polycyclic Aromatic Compounds	5 lb	0 lb	8 lb	0 lb	12 lb
Total	298,600 lb	6,069 lb	2,369,622 lb	36 lb	2,674,327 lb

== Environmental initiatives ==
Through the resources of the Tennessee Valley Authority and AECOM the Shawnee Fossil Plant installed scrubbers that remove both sulfur dioxide and nitrogen oxides produced in Units 1 and 4. In addition, this operation was able to reduce mercury emissions as a byproduct. The recent installation of these scrubbers has drawn large public attention and even praise from the energy industry for their benefits on the local public and environment. Despite these steps towards a more environmentally friendly energy solution plans still remain to shut down the Shawnee Fossil Plant along with the surrounding coal plants. The clean energy solutions meant to replace the TVA's coal fleet will not only help ensure the safety of local inhabitants but also provide economic stimulation upon the construction of new facilities and the demolition processes to safely decommission the coal fleet.

== See also ==
- Coal mining in Kentucky
- List of power stations in Kentucky

== External resources ==
- Official website
