= Sebree Station =

Group of three power plants in Webster County, Kentucky, U.S.

Coordinates: 37°38′51″N 87°30′00″W

Sebree Station is the informal name given to a group of three coal-fired power plants co-located together in the northeast corner of Webster County, near Sebree, Kentucky. They are owned and operated by the Big Rivers Electric Corporation.

== Overview ==
Sebree Station comprises

- Henderson Station Two
- Robert D. Green Generating Station
- Robert Reid Power Station

== See also ==
- Coal mining in Kentucky
