= Mill Creek Generating Station =

Coal-fired power plant in Louisville, Kentucky, United States

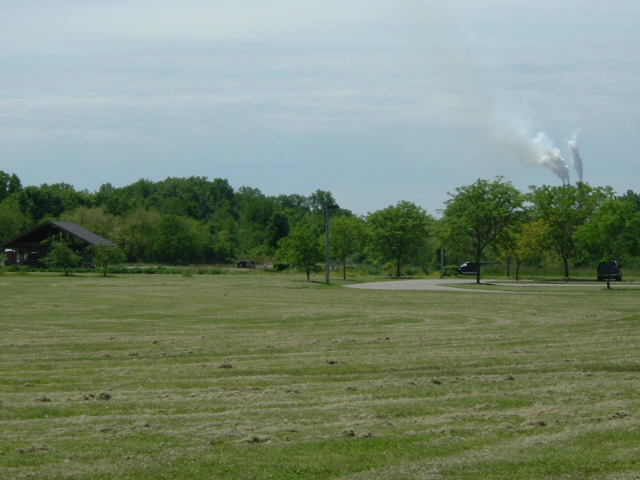
- Mill Creek's steam stacks viewed from the Farnsley Morman House
- Country: United States
- Location: Louisville, Kentucky
- Coordinates: 38.05°N 85.91°W
- Commission date: 1972
- Owner: Louisville Gas & Electric

Thermal power station
- Primary fuel: Bituminous coal
- Cooling source: Ohio River

Power generation
- Units operational: 4
- Nameplate capacity: 1,717 MW

The Mill Creek Generating Station is a coal-fired power plant owned and operated by Louisville Gas & Electric in the Kosmosdale neighborhood of Louisville, Kentucky. It is located on 544 acres in southwest Louisville, about 20 miles from downtown.

Construction on the plant began in 1968 to meet growing energy demand in the Louisville area, according to the utility. Unit 1 went into service by 1972, unit 2 by 1974, unit 3 by 1978, and unit 4 in 1982.

Mill Creek Generating Station is LG&E's largest coal-fired power plant. It consumes about 4.8 million tons of fuel annually.

In 2024, the utility began construction on a 640-megawatt natural gas combined-cycle generating unit at the plant, expected to begin operations in 2027.

== Emissions Data ==
- 2022 Greenhouse gas emissions: 7,066,313 MTCO2e
- 2022 CO_{2} Emissions: 15,452,873,560 pounds
- 2022 SO_{2} Emissions: 6,338,998 pounds
- 2022 NO_{x} Emissions: 10,784,738 pounds

== See also ==
- Coal mining in Kentucky
