= Dix Dam =

- Location within Kentucky
- Location: Mercer and Garrard County, Kentucky
- Coordinates: 37°47′07″N 84°42′14″W
- Construction began: 1923
- Opening date: 1925
- Operator: Kentucky Utilities

Dam and spillways
- Impounds: Dix River
- Height: 287 ft (87 m)
- Length: 1,087 ft (331 m)
- Width (base): 750 ft (230 m)

Reservoir
- Creates: Herrington Lake
- Total capacity: 537,000 acre⋅ft (662,000,000 m^{3})
- Surface area: 2,335 acres (945 ha)

The Dix Dam is a dam on the Dix River located between Mercer and Garrard County, Kentucky. It was constructed to generate hydroelectricity and prevent flooding of the Kentucky River but is better known for creating Herrington Lake.

== History ==
Dix Dam was built to create a reservoir for operating a hydroelectric generating station. The dam also helped mitigate flooding on the Kentucky River by holding water in Herrington Lake during critical periods. Construction began in the fall of 1923, impoundment of water began on March 17, 1925, and the project was completed and power generation began in November 1925. The project cost more than US $7 million.

Dix Dam was constructed by Kentucky Utilities, a private corporation prior to the Great Depression. Consequently, Kentucky Utilities owns the land beneath Herrington Lake up to the maximum possible lake level of 760 feet (230 m) above sea level. It also owns Dix Dam.

When Dix Dam was built, it was the largest rock filled dam in the world. The top of the dam is 287 feet (87 m) above the riverbed and 1,087 feet (331 m) across and is 24 feet (7.3 m) wide at the top and 750 feet (230 m) wide at its base. Herrington Lake is the deepest lake in Kentucky. It is 35 miles (56 km) long, up to 1,200 feet (370 m) wide, covers 2,335 acres (945 ha) and has 325 miles (523 km) of shoreline. It is deepest near the Dix Dam with water depth of 249 feet (76 m) and has a mean depth of 78 feet (24 m). The estimated capacity of the lake is 175,000,000,000 US gallons (660,000,000 m^{3}).

The hydroelectric generating station was originally designed to produce 30 megawatts of power. Over time, other generating plants were constructed near the dam and the facility was named E. W. Brown Generating Station. A coal-fired generator was added to the Brown Plant in 1957. More recently, a combustion turbine generating facility was added with six turbine units - four more are planned. They are fueled by either natural gas or fuel oil.

Kentucky Utilities' systems control center has been located inside the Dix Dam plant since the 1920s. In 1954, they built a new control center near the dam. Subsequently, they have modernized and computerized the control center.

In 1991, Kentucky Utilities constructed a fish ladder in the Dix River near the dam as part of the Aquatic Habitat Enhancement Project, with the aim of protecting and increasing the trout population in the Dix River.

== Current status ==
The original hydroelectric plant is now used mainly when heavy rainfall results in above normal lake elevation. The plant was overhauled in 2010 and now produces up to 33 megawatts of power with all three units on. The three coal-fired generators can produce 700 megawatts of electricity, more than one-fifth of KU's total capacity. An average of 15,000,000 short tons (1.4×10^{10} kg) of coal is burned annually at Brown Station. Four of the combustion turbine units can deliver 110 megawatts each; the other two can produce 164 megawatts each. During periods of high demand, the combustion turbines can be started and come to full load in just 30 minutes.
