= William C. Dale Power Station =

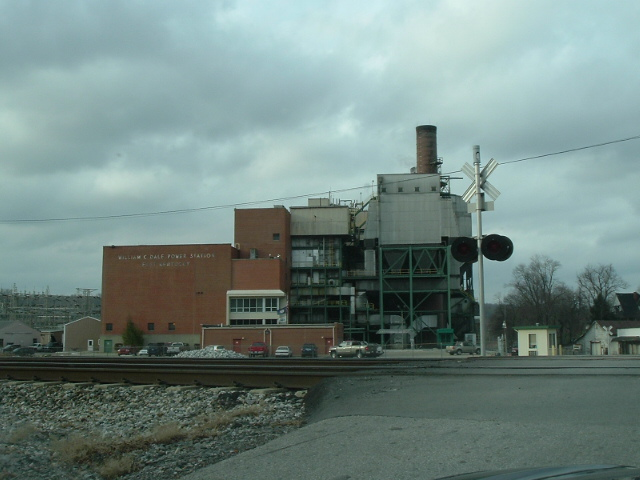
- Dale Power Station
- Country: United States
- Location: Clark County, near Winchester, Kentucky
- Coordinates: 37.8807°N 84.2633°W
- Status: Currently Being Demolished (Estimated completion July 2019
- Commission date: 1954
- Decommission date: 2015 (Units #1 and #2) 2016 (Units #3 and 4)
- Owner: East Kentucky Power Cooperative

Thermal power station
- Primary fuel: Bituminous coal
- Cooling source: Kentucky River

Power generation
- Units operational: 0
- Nameplate capacity: 0 MW

The William C. Dale Power Station is a coal-fired power station owned and operated by East Kentucky Cooperative near Winchester, Kentucky. It is located about 20 miles southeast of Lexington, Kentucky.

== Emissions data ==
- 2006 CO_{2} Emissions: 1,186,544 tons
- 2006 SO_{2} Emissions:
- 2006 SO_{2} Emissions per MWh:
- 2006 NO_{x} Emissions:
- 2005 Mercury Emissions:

== See also ==
- Coal mining in Kentucky
