= Elmer Smith Power Plant =

Former coal-fired power station in Owensboro, Kentucky, United States

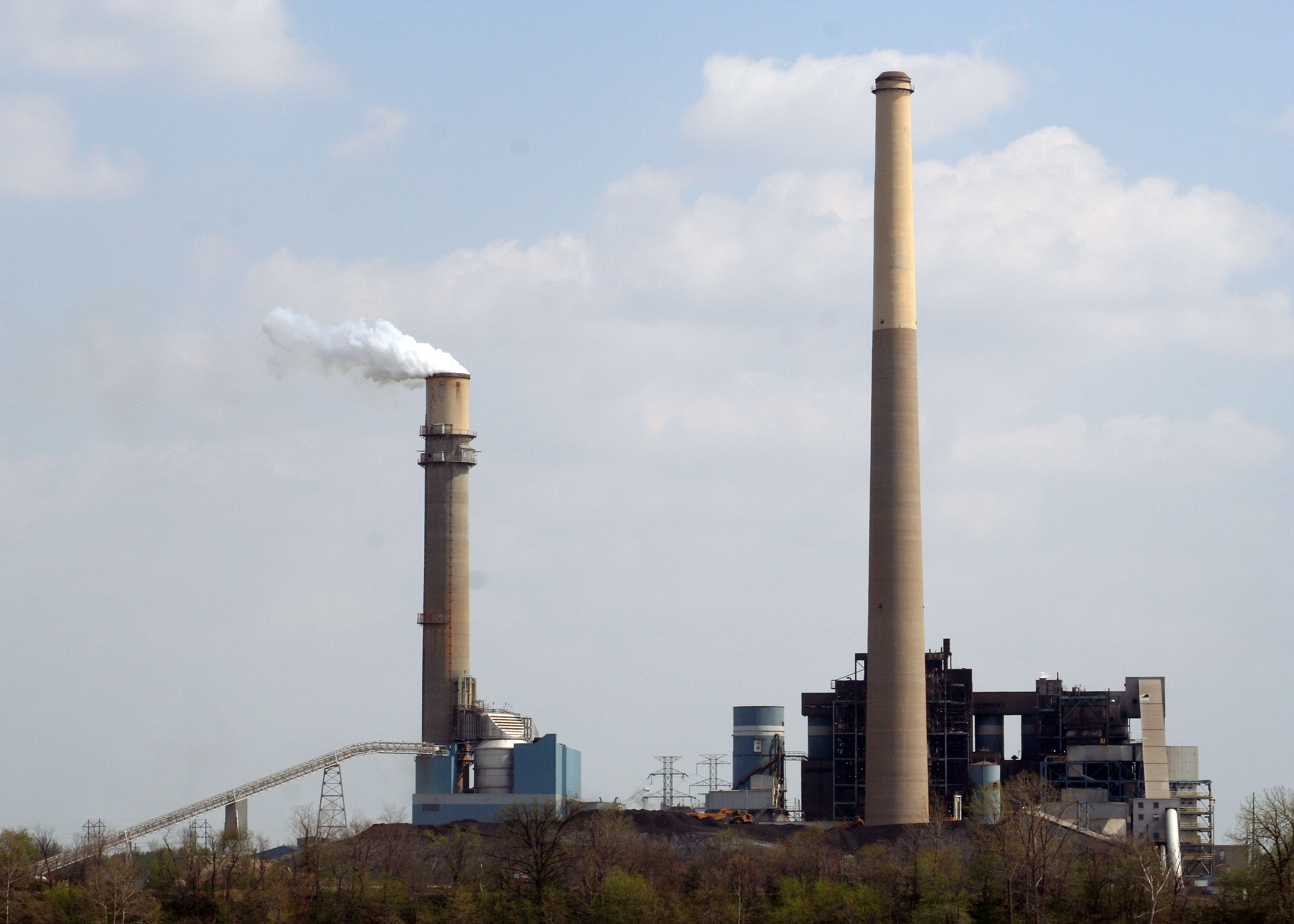
- Power station in April 2006
- Country: United States
- Location: Owensboro, Kentucky
- Coordinates: 37.79°N 87.06°W
- Status: Decommissioned
- Commission date: 1964
- Decommission date: June 1st, 2020
- Owner: Owensboro Municipal Utilities

Thermal power station
- Primary fuel: Bituminous coal
- Cooling source: Ohio River

Power generation
- Units operational: 2
- Nameplate capacity: 445 MW
- Capacity factor: 45.7% (2017)
- Annual net output: 1,780 GWh (2017)

The Elmer Smith Power Plant was a coal-fired power plant owned and operated by the city of Owensboro, Kentucky. Unit 1 opened in 1964 with Unit 2 opening 10 years later in 1974

The power plant was the main source of power for the city of Owensboro during the years it was active.

== History ==
As a result of the Owensboro Municipal Utility Commission approving a contract with Big Rivers Electric to supply electricity for Owensboro, Elmer Smith Power Plant closed on June 1, 2020, and was demolished on December 4, 2022, making it two years, six months and three days later after the power plant's closure.

== Emissions data ==
- 2006 CO_{2} Emissions: 2,846,615 tons
- 2006 SO_{2} Emissions: 2,525 tons
- 2006 NO_{x} Emissions: 7,045 tons
- 2005 Mercury Emissions: 59 lb

== Controversy ==
In 2010, The Clean Air Task Force conducted a study to identify and quantify deaths and other injuries attributed to fine particle pollution from coal-fired power plants and found there to be an estimated 10 deaths annually as a result of fine particle pollution from the Elmer Smith Power Station as well as other negative effects on the health of those affected by the pollutants.

Type of Impact	Annual Incidence	Valuation
Deaths	10	$75,000
Heart attacks	16	$1,700,000
Asthma attacks	170	$9,000
Hospital admissions	7	$170,000
Chronic bronchitis	6	$2,800,000
Asthma ER visits	11	$4,000

== Closing ==
In 2019, the city of Owensboro made the landmark decision to close the plant as part of its economic evolution and effort to attract more tourism (5) By closing the plant, the city plans on switching primarily to solar power by 2022 by purchasing energy from the Ashwood Solar Station which is set to open in Lyon County, Kentucky.

== See also ==
- Coal mining in Kentucky
- Owensboro, Kentucky
- Coal-fired power station
- Solar power in Kentucky
