= Dix River =

Stream in Kentucky

Coordinates: 37°48′53″N 84°42′59″W

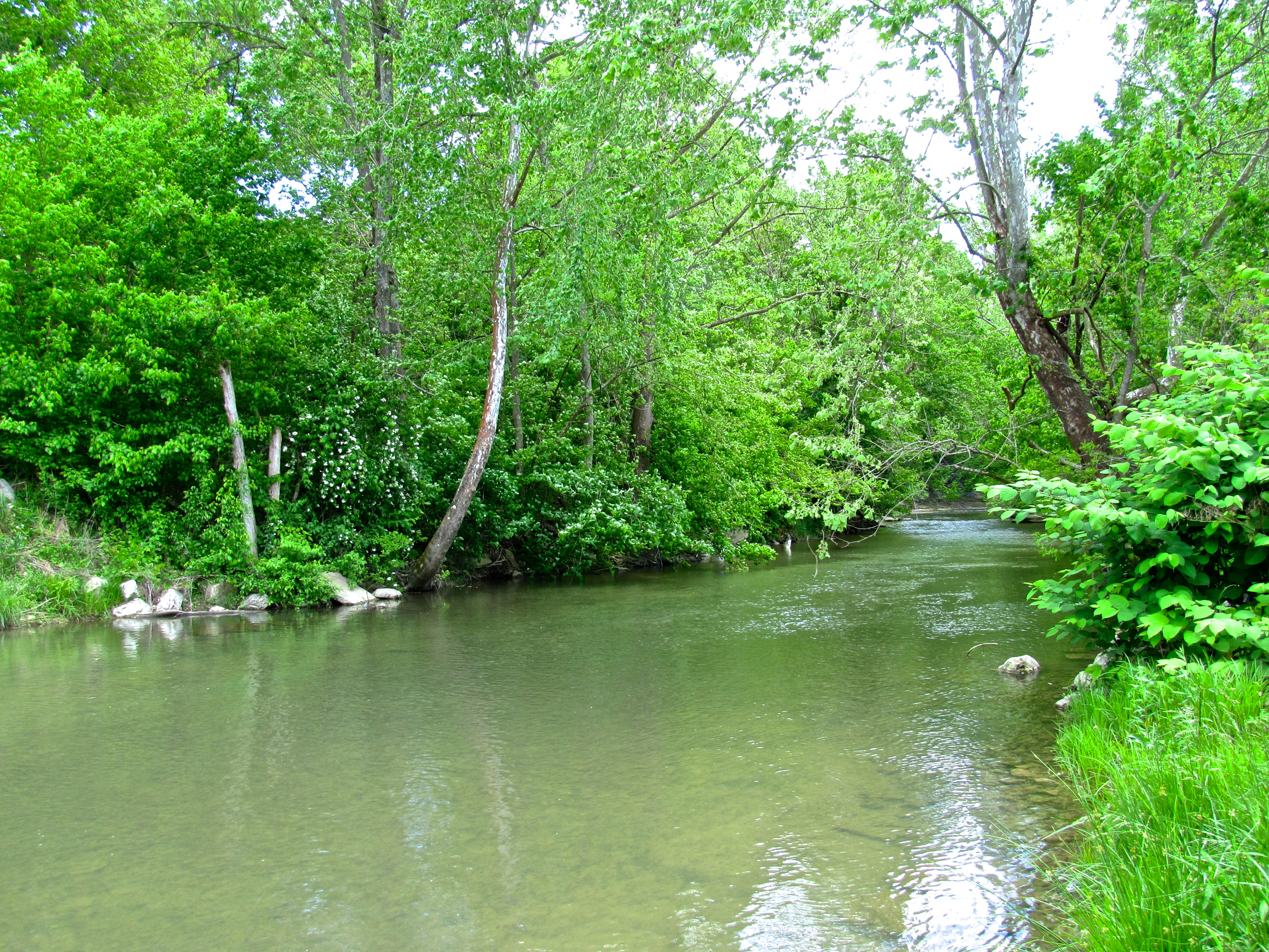
The Dix River near its headwaters in Brodhead

The Dix River is a 79.3-mile-long (127.6 km) tributary of the Kentucky River in central Kentucky in the United States. It begins in western Rockcastle County, about 5 miles (8 km) west of Mount Vernon. It flows generally northwest, in a tight meandering course, passing north of Stanford and east of Danville. Northeast of Danville it is impounded by the Dix Dam to form the Herrington Lake reservoir. The river flows about 2 miles (3 km) before joining the Kentucky River near High Bridge, about 20 miles (32 km) southwest of Lexington, in the region of the Kentucky River Palisades.

At Danville, the river has a mean annual discharge of 480 cubic feet per second. The watershed of the river is largely agricultural land, with undulating hills over a bed of limestone. The river is a popular destination for fly fishing, in particular for varieties of bass. Occasionally, recreational kayakers and canoeists can be found on same-day trips. Water levels are Class I+ with possible mild class II.

== See also ==
- Cedar Creek (Dix River tributary)
- List of rivers of Kentucky
