= Isabella S. Davis Spurlock =

Philanthropist

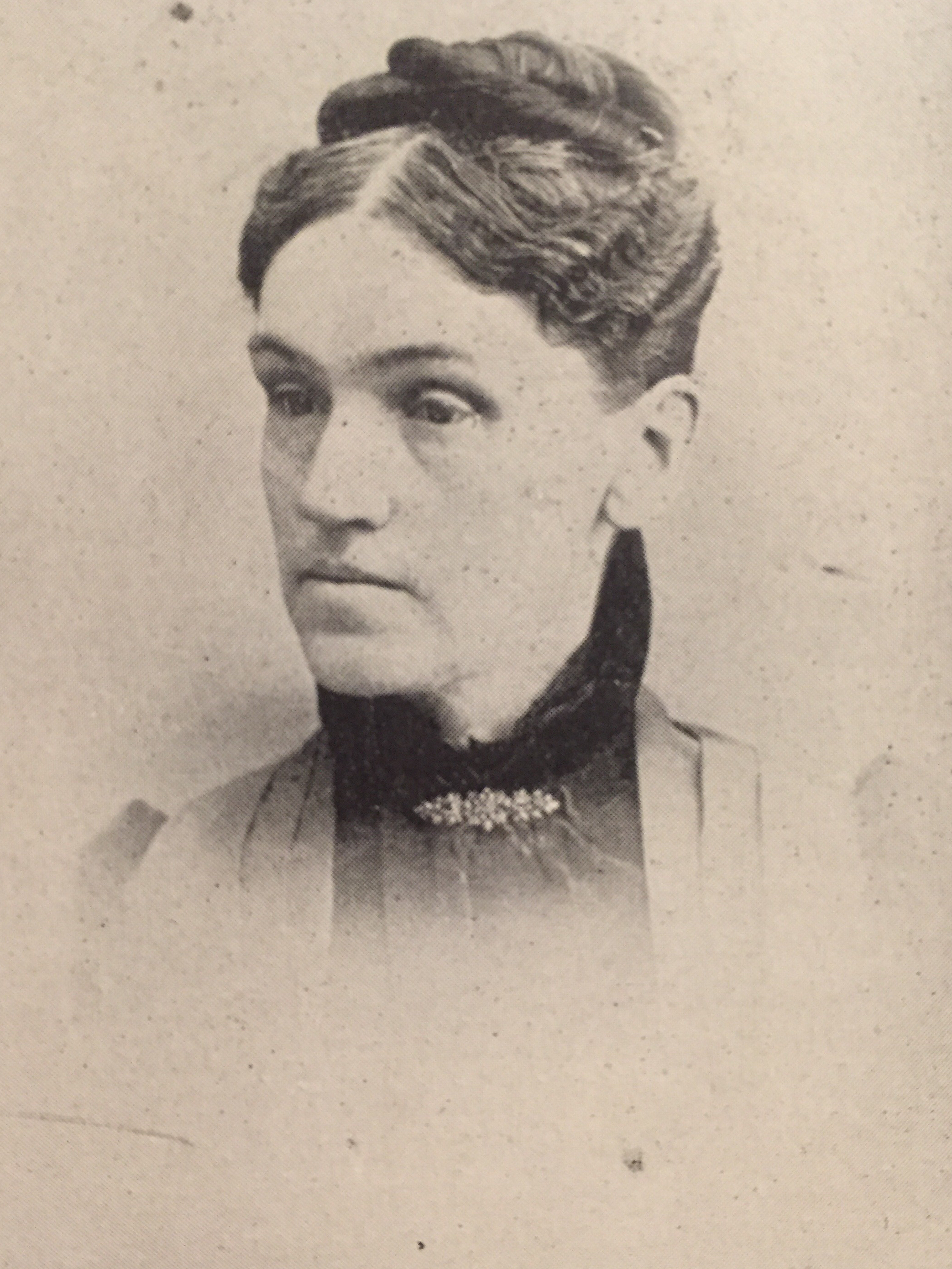
Isabella S. Davis Spurlock

Isabella Smiley Davis Spurlock (January 21, 1843 – October 14, 1906) was a philanthropist.

== Early life ==
Isabella Smiley Davis Spurlock was born in Nodaway County, Missouri, on January 21, 1843. Her father, William H Davis (1814–1875), was a descendant of Jefferson Davis and was born in Tennessee. Her mother's name was Sarah Elizabeth Windham/Windom (1814–1877), and she belonged to a good family. Davis's child-life was one of care and responsibility, instead of play and pastime.

== Career ==
Isabella S. Davis Spurlock's first public work was in the interest of foreign missions, organizing societies. During the temperance crusade she was one of the leaders who was active in promoting its ideals. She twice represented the society in national conventions and was State superintendent of mothers' and social purity meetings. She was often a member of committees appointed to confer with important people.

In the spring of 1882, she was disabled physically, so that she was obliged to give up all public work, and a year of intense pain followed. She believed prayers of herself and friends cured her and that she received the command to, "Go to Utah, and visit the sick and imprisoned." She followed the call and spent two years among the women of Utah. While there, she assisted in opening a day nursery, where Mormon wives could leave their children while they were at work. She led in the movement to organize a Christian association, formed of the women of all denominations, for the assistance of the helpless women of Mormon faith.

In 1886 she was made trustee of an orphan's home on a farm in the West. Finally, she persuaded the national executive committee of the Women's Home Missionary Society to adopt the movement, and in 1891 she and her husband were appointed to the superintendency of that work, the Mothers' Jewels' Home, near York, Nebraska.

== Personal life ==
On November 1 of 1860, she married Burwell Spurlock (1835-1931), of Virginia, who belonged to one of the prominent families of the South, eminent in political and church work. They lived in Plattsmouth, Nebraska. Her husband WAS connected with the church officially, aided in establishing the Methodist Episcopal Church in the new West.

She had two sons, William Wesley Spurlock (1863-1864), who died in infancy, and George Marquis Spurlock (1866-1949), who graduated with the law class of 1892 from De Pauw University, Greencastle, Indiana.

She died on October 14, 1906, and is buried at Greenwood Cemetery, York, Nebraska.
