= Ghent Generating Station =

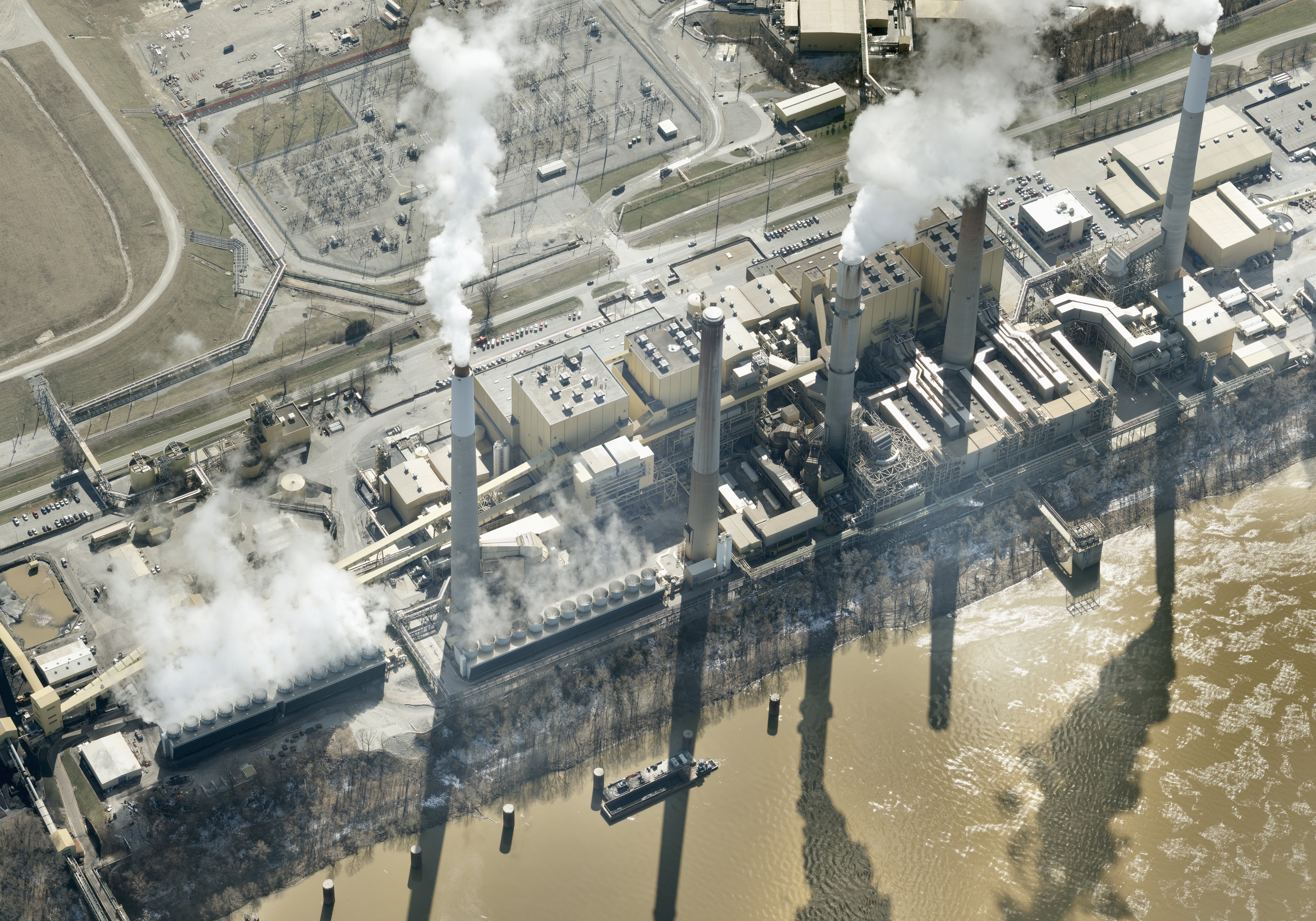
- Country: United States
- Location: Carroll County, near Ghent, Kentucky
- Coordinates: 38°45′15″N 85°01′17″W
- Status: Operational
- Commission date: 1973
- Owner: Kentucky Utilities

Thermal power station
- Primary fuel: Bituminous coal
- Cooling source: Ohio River

Power generation
- Units operational: 4
- Nameplate capacity: 2,000 MW

External links
- Website: www.lge-ku.com/ku/ku_plant_info.asp

The Ghent Generating Station is a coal-fired power plant owned and operated by Kentucky Utilities near Ghent, Kentucky. It is located between Louisville, Kentucky and Cincinnati, Ohio. The plant is connected to the grid by numerous 138 and 345kv transmission lines.

== Emissions data ==
- 2006 CO_{2} Emissions: 12,933,318 tons
- 2006 SO_{2} Emissions: 49,913 tons
- 2006 SO_{2} Emissions per MWh:
- 2006 NO_{x} Emissions: 14,318 tons
- 2005 Mercury Emissions: 413 lb.
- Coal Consumed daily: 14,000 tons

== See also ==
- Coal mining in Kentucky
