= Cane Run Generating Station =

Natural gas power plant in Louisville, Kentucky, United States

Cane Run Station
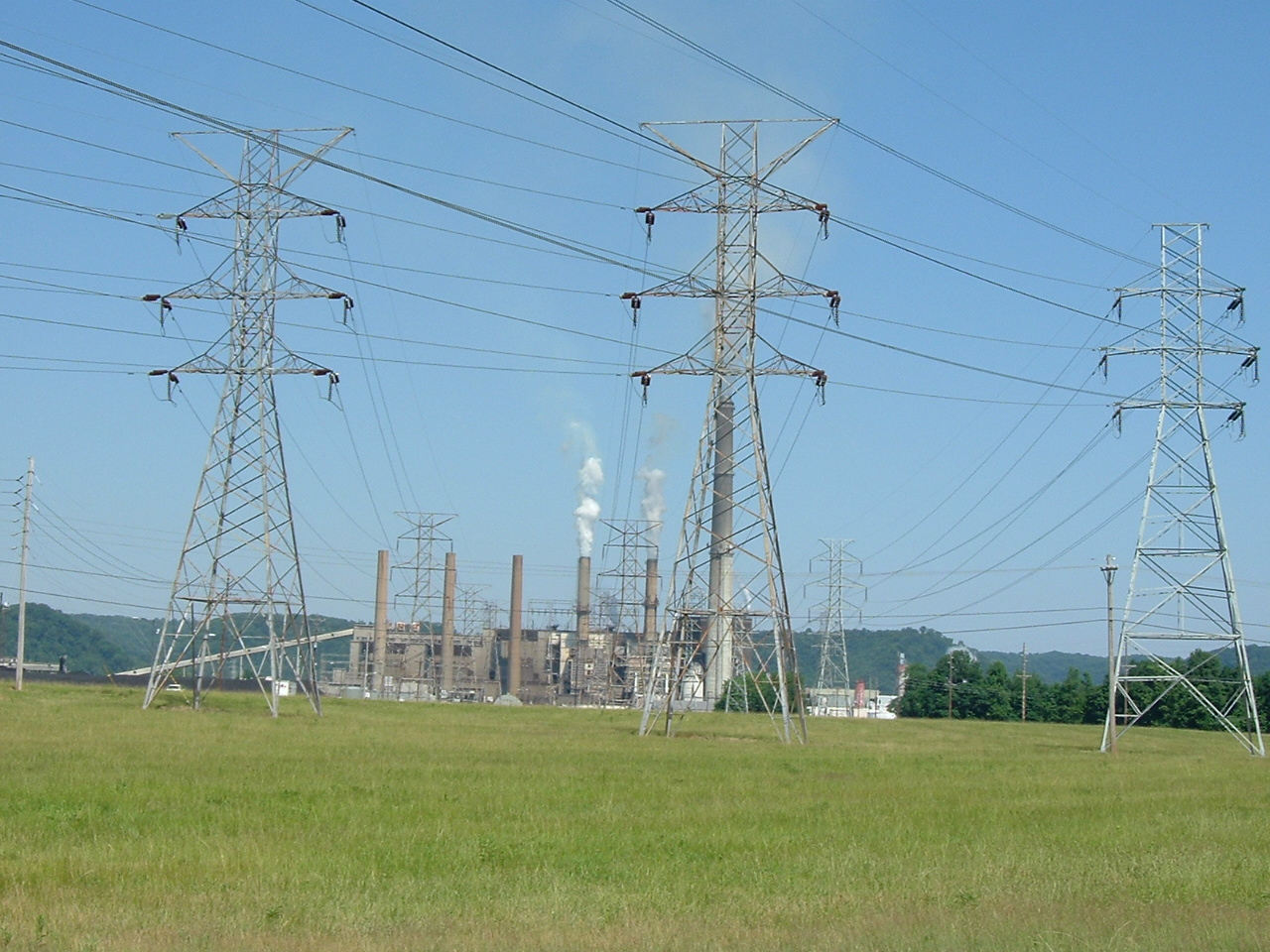
- Cane Run Station's former coal units viewed from the Louisville Loop bike trail
- Country: United States
- Location: Louisville, Kentucky
- Coordinates: 38°10′36.03″N 85°53′28.07″W
- Status: Operational
- Commission date: Unit 1: 1954; Unit 2: 1956; Unit 3: 1958; Unit 4: 1962; Unit 5: 1966; Unit 6: 1969; Unit 7: 2015
- Decommission date: Units 1–3: 1987; Unit 6: March 2015; Units 4–5: June 2015
- Owner: Louisville Gas and Electric

Thermal power station
- Primary fuel: Natural gas
- Cooling source: Ohio River

Power generation
- Units operational: 1
- Nameplate capacity: 640 MW

The Cane Run Generating Station is a 640 megawatt (MW), natural gas power plant owned and operated by Louisville Gas and Electric (LG&E). It is 10 miles (16 km) southwest of Downtown Louisville, Kentucky, in its Pleasure Ridge Park neighborhood. It was formerly a coal power plant until 2015.

== History ==
Cane Run began operation on its first unit in 1954 and expanded to six units by 1969. Its total generating capacity was 943 (MW). Sulfur dioxide (SO_{2}) scrubber technology, pioneered by LG&E, were installed at this plant in 1973. President Jimmy Carter visited the plant in July 1979 to promote energy security during the 1979 energy crisis. Units 1-3 were retired in 1987. The power plant was mired in a lawsuit in 2013 from nearby residents over its dispersion of coal ash. In preparation of converting to natural gas, Unit 6 was shut down in March 2015. The final two units went offline in June 2015. At the same time, construction of Unit 7 was completed and began running on natural gas. The former coal power plant structure was demolished by implosion on June 8, 2019.

== See also ==
- Louisville Gas & Electric
