= John Sherman Cooper Power Station =

Coal-fired power station in Burnside, Kentucky, United States

- Country: United States
- Location: Pulaski County, near Somerset, Kentucky
- Coordinates: 36.99°N 84.59°W
- Status: Operational
- Commission date: 1965
- Owner: East Kentucky Power Cooperative

Thermal power station
- Primary fuel: Bituminous coal
- Cooling source: Lake Cumberland

Power generation
- Units operational: 2
- Nameplate capacity: 341 MW

The John Sherman Cooper Power Station is a coal-fired power plant owned and operated by the East Kentucky Cooperative near Somerset, Kentucky. It is actually closest to the smaller city of Burnside. It is named after John Sherman Cooper, a U.S. Senator from Kentucky.

== Emissions Data ==
- 2006 CO_{2} Emissions: 1,931,758 tons
- 2006 SO_{2} Emissions:
- 2006 SO_{2} Emissions per MWh:
- 2006 NO_{x} Emissions:
- 2005 Mercury Emissions:

== See also ==
- Coal mining in Kentucky

== External resources ==
- http://www.ekpc.coop
