= Sebree, Kentucky =

- City
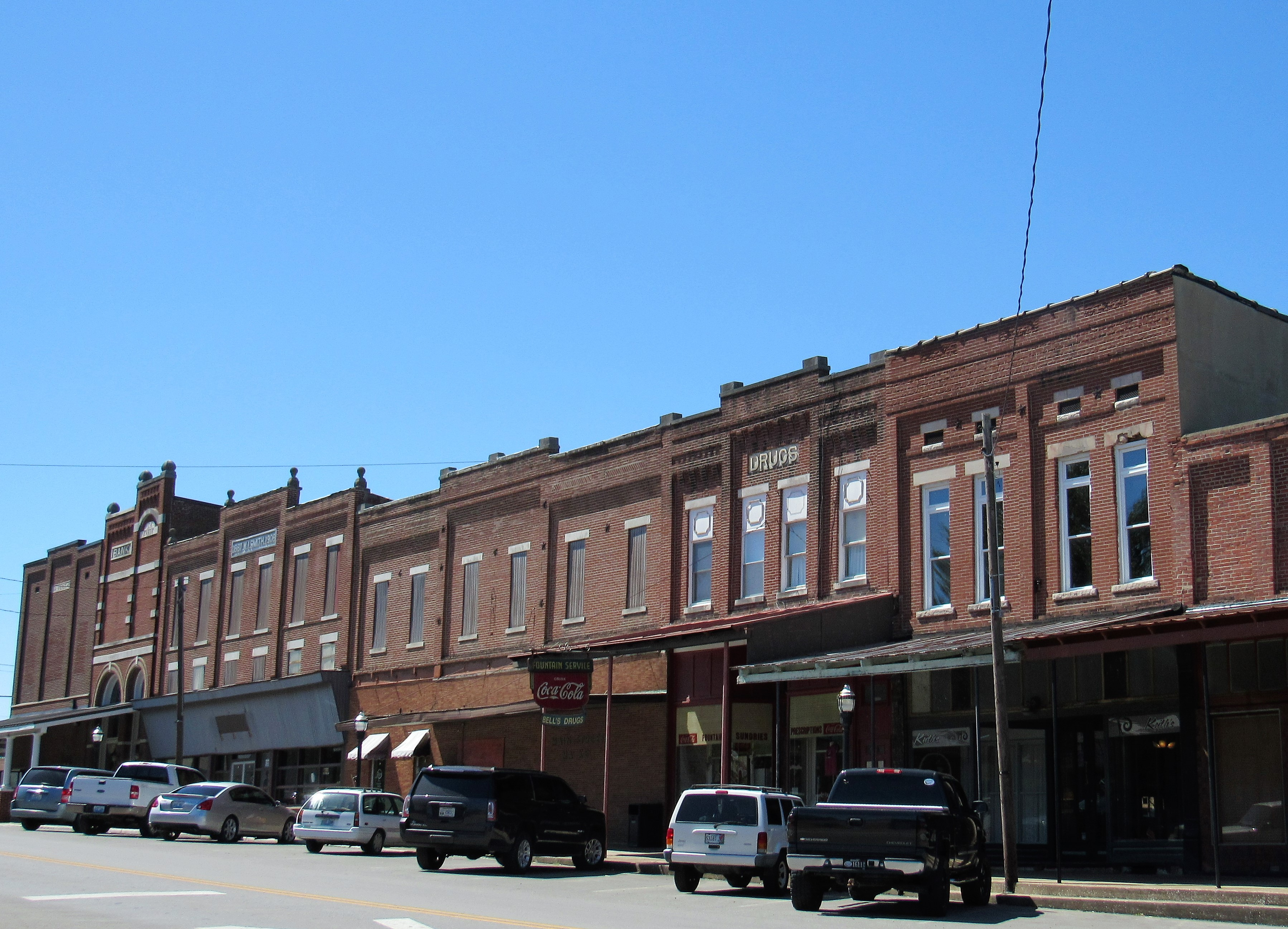
- Business district of Sebree
- Nickname: Railroad country
- Location of Sebree in Webster County, Kentucky.
- Coordinates: 37°36′29″N 87°31′46″W
- Country: United States
- State: Kentucky
- County: Webster
- Incorporated: 1871

Area
  - Total: 2.95 sq mi (7.63 km^{2})
  - Land: 2.94 sq mi (7.61 km^{2})
  - Water: 0.0077 sq mi (0.02 km^{2})
- Elevation: 387 ft (118 m)

Population (2020)
  - Total: 1,574
  - Estimate (2022): 1,533
  - Density: 535.8/sq mi (206.88/km^{2})
- Time zone: UTC-6 (Central (CST))
  - Summer (DST): UTC-5 (CDT)
- ZIP code: 42455
- Area code: 270
- FIPS code: 21-69222
- GNIS feature ID: 0503138
- Website: https://cityofsebreeky.com/

Sebree (/ˈsiːbri/) is a home rule-class city in Webster County, Kentucky, in the United States. As of the 2020 census, Sebree had a population of 1,574.

== History ==
Sebree was founded as a railroad town in 1868, just ahead of the arrival of the Louisville and Nashville Railroad in October. The town founders, William Scott and Col. E.G. Sebree, intended to name it Springdale after nearby natural springs, but the name was preëmpted by another community in Mason County. The post office was initially named McBride, but renamed for Col. Sebree (the first president of the St. Bernard Mining Company) in 1870 for his assistance in bringing the railroad to this part of the state.

The L&N depot was on the eastern side of the track and furnished with day and night operators. At one time, Sebree was home to some 40 businesses, hotels, shops and stores. The first nondenominational church was erected in 1870. It was quickly followed by Methodist, Catholic, and Baptist churches. The town was also home to Sebree Springs, a summer resort and park operated by G.L. Dial. Telephone service arrived in 1895, and several tobacco factories were also built.

The historic Sebree Deposit Bank (c. 1890) is still in operation with a refurbished interior including a marble floor. Another historic site in the area is the Queen Anne McMullin-Warren House (c. 1901).

== Geography ==
Sebree is located at 37°36′29″N 87°31′46″W (37.608104, -87.529356). According to the United States Census Bureau, the city has a total area of 1.6 square miles (4.1 km^{2}), all land.

== Demographics ==
Historical population
Census	Pop.	Note	%±
1880	360		—
1890	959		166.4%
1900	1,477		54.0%
1910	1,500		1.6%
1920	1,258		−16.1%
1930	940		−25.3%
1940	1,109		18.0%
1950	1,158		4.4%
1960	1,139		−1.6%
1970	1,092		−4.1%
1980	1,516		38.8%
1990	1,510		−0.4%
2000	1,558		3.2%
2010	1,603		2.9%
2020	1,574		−1.8%
2022 (est.)	1,533		−2.6%
U.S. Decennial Census

=== 2020 census ===
As of the 2020 census, Sebree had a population of 1,574. The median age was 35.6 years. 31.3% of residents were under the age of 18 and 15.6% of residents were 65 years of age or older. For every 100 females there were 98.0 males, and for every 100 females age 18 and over there were 94.6 males age 18 and over.

0.0% of residents lived in urban areas, while 100.0% lived in rural areas.

There were 511 households in Sebree, of which 42.7% had children under the age of 18 living in them. Of all households, 47.4% were married-couple households, 18.4% were households with a male householder and no spouse or partner present, and 25.6% were households with a female householder and no spouse or partner present. About 23.9% of all households were made up of individuals and 9.5% had someone living alone who was 65 years of age or older.

There were 574 housing units, of which 11.0% were vacant. The homeowner vacancy rate was 0.3% and the rental vacancy rate was 5.6%.

Racial composition as of the 2020 census
Race	Number	Percent
White	1,087	69.1%
Black or African American	18	1.1%
American Indian and Alaska Native	57	3.6%
Asian	6	0.4%
Native Hawaiian and Other Pacific Islander	0	0.0%
Some other race	308	19.6%
Two or more races	98	6.2%
Hispanic or Latino (of any race)	612	38.9%

=== 2000 census ===
As of the 2000 census, there were 1,558 people, 573 households, and 374 families residing in the city. The population density was 959.5 inhabitants per square mile (370.5/km^{2}). There were 627 housing units at an average density of 386.2 units per square mile (149.1 units/km^{2}). The racial makeup of the city was 93.77% White, 0.64% African American, 0.19% Native American, 0.06% Pacific Islander, 5.01% from other races, and 0.32% from two or more races. Hispanic or Latino of any race were 11.30% of the population.

There were 573 households, out of which 31.1% had children under the age of 18 living with them, 48.0% were married couples living together, 10.8% had a female householder with no husband present, and 34.6% were non-families. 28.6% of all households were made up of individuals, and 12.2% had someone living alone who was 65 years of age or older. The average household size was 2.54 and the average family size was 3.00.

In the city, the population was spread out, with 23.3% under the age of 18, 11.6% from 18 to 24, 27.8% from 25 to 44, 20.0% from 45 to 64, and 17.3% who were 65 years of age or older. The median age was 36 years. For every 100 females, there were 96.2 males. For every 100 females age 18 and over, there were 98.5 males.

The median income for a household in the city was $29,663, and the median income for a family was $35,221. Males had a median income of $21,379 versus $18,438 for females. The per capita income for the city was $14,339. About 17.4% of families and 22.3% of the population were below the poverty line, including 31.9% of those under age 18 and 12.4% of those age 65 or over.

== Climate ==
The climate in this area is characterized by hot, humid summers and generally mild to cool winters. According to the Köppen Climate Classification system, Sebree has a humid subtropical climate, abbreviated "Cfa" on climate maps.

== Media ==
The Sebree Banner is a weekly newspaper and one of the media outlets of CPC Newspaper Group. The masthead states that it is Webster County's Oldest Newspaper. As per Harris Industrial Directory published in 1995, the paper was established in 1885, the paper has four employees, has sales under $500K, and is privately owned. The newspaper is archived in Google newspapers.

== Education ==
Webster County School District operates public schools, including Sebree Elementary, Webster County Middle School and Webster County High School.

== See also ==
- Sebree Station
- WREF (FM)
