= Louisville Gas & Electric =

Utility company in Louisville, Kentucky

- Industry: Utilities
- Founded: 1838
- Headquarters: Louisville, United States
- Parent: LG&E and KU Energy

Louisville Gas & Electric (LG&E) is a utilities company based in Louisville, Kentucky. A subsidiary of PPL Corporation through the LG&E and KU Energy subsidiary, LG&E serves over 429,000 electric and over 333,000 natural gas customers, covers an area of 700 square miles (1800 km^{2}), and has a total regulated electric generation capacity of 2,760 megawatts.

The President is John R. Crockett III.

== History ==
LG&E was formed in 1838 as Louisville Gas and Water but dropped its plans to provide water utilities in 1842 changing its name simply to Louisville Gas. Louisville Gas and Water was originally formed by investors with the intention of providing gas-fired street lighting which had been mandated in order to help prevent crime. In 1890 Louisville Gas amended its charter to buy stock in electric companies and acquired Louisville Electric light. In 1913, Louisville Gas, Louisville Lighting, and Kentucky Heating merged to form Louisville Gas & Electric (LG&E).

In 1979, the construction of Trimble Country electric generation station started. In 1990, LG&E reorganized itself as a holding company LG&E Energy Corporation. In 1998, LG&E Energy merged with the other major electric utility in Kentucky, Kentucky Utilities. In 2000, LG&E Energy was bought by British utility company Powergen. In 2002, Powergen was bought by the German company E.ON. In 2003, LG&E Energy changed its name to E.ON US.

Finally, in 2010, E.ON US was bought by PPL Corporation. PPL changed the name of the company to LG&E and KU Energy LLC. PPL and E.ON announced on April 28, 2010, a definitive agreement under which PPL will acquire E.ON US for $7.625 billion. The sale was closed on November 1, 2010.

Since 2011, the company's bills are available to be paid at Walmart.

== Generation ==
The current electric generating stations serving the region include two coal-fired plants (Trimble County Generating Station and Mill Creek Station), one natural gas/fuel oil combustion turbine, one hydroelectric plant (Ohio Falls Station), two natural gas facilities (Muldraugh and Magnolia Compressor Stations) and one natural gas combined cycle facility (Cane Run Station).

== Process for calculating customer gas billing ==
Under its contract with the Kentucky Public Service Commission (PSC), LG&E estimates two out of every three months' of each customer's gas consumption. This allows the publicly traded company to ensure it hits projected revenue estimates reported quarterly to its stockholders regardless of actual customer consumption. Under its PSC contract, the company is only required to attempt one actual, manual read of each customer's gas meter per quarter, and is only required to actually complete a manual read once per every six months. Under the company's stated theory, this means that although the customer has been billed based on estimates and anticipated revenue for 5 months, the account billed will true-up on the 6th month when a manual read is completed. The subsequent quarter can then begin with several months of estimated reads that allow the company to report achievement of its projected revenue to stockholders. Consumer complaints show that in actuality this practice wildly overestimates customer usage for the first 5 months of a billing period in able for the company to report to stockholders that projected revenues were achieved and for employee bonuses to be dispersed, then for the correction for overbilling to occur in the first month of the subsequent billing cycle, giving customers either just 1 out of 3 months with correct billing or just 1 out of 6 months with correct billing. If the cumulative total of manual reads equals revenue less than projected to stockholders, LG&E is permitted to spread the difference across its customers' accounts.
