= Hugh L. Spurlock Generating Station =

Coal-fired power station in Maysville, Kentucky, United States

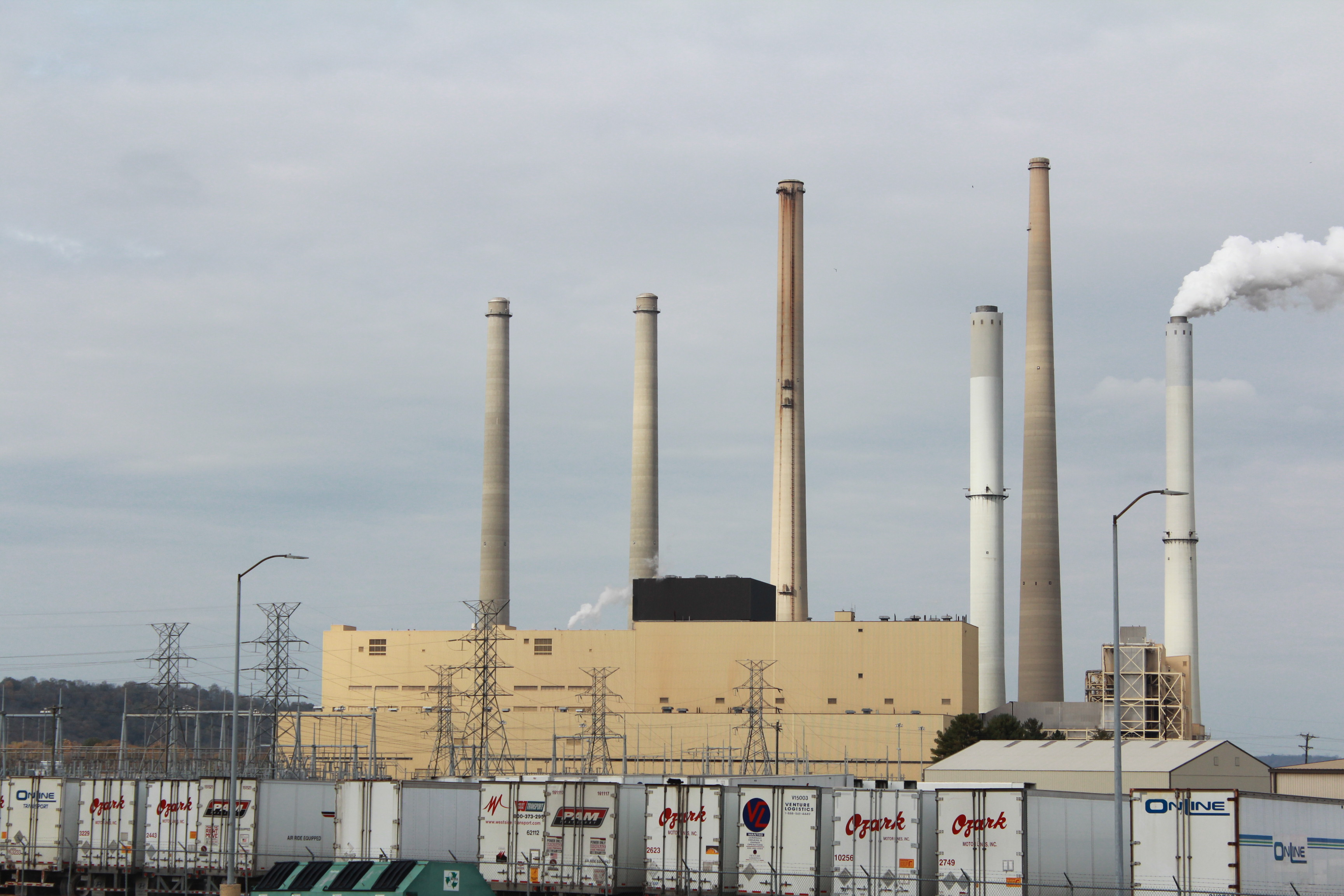
- Hugh L. Spurlock Generating Station viewed from KY Route 8
- Country: United States
- Location: Maysville, Kentucky
- Coordinates: 38°41′55″N 83°49′0″W
- Status: Operational
- Commission date: Unit 1: 1977; Unit 2: 1981; Unit 3: 2005; Unit 4: 2009
- Owner: East Kentucky Power Cooperative (EKPC)
- Operator: East Kentucky Power Cooperative (EKPC)

Thermal power station
- Primary fuel: Bituminous coal
- Cooling source: Ohio River

Power generation
- Units operational: 4
- Nameplate capacity: 1,346 MW

The Hugh L. Spurlock Generating Station is a 1.3-gigawatt (1,346 MW) coal power plant owned and operated by the East Kentucky Power Cooperative (EKPC) located west of Maysville, Kentucky. The plant began operations in 1977.

== History ==
When Spurlock was first proposed, the power plant was opposed by local physicians. They were concerned that Spurlock along with J.M. Stuart Station nearby would lower the quality of life in Maysville. Their opposition was rendered moot when the Franklin Circuit Court upheld the Kentucky Air Pollution Control Commission's approval for granting a permit. Construction of Unit 1 commenced in 1972 and commercial began generation in 1977 at a cost of $125 million. Unit 1 has a nameplate capacity of 319 MW. Unit 2 went online in 1981 with a nameplate capacity of 500 MW. The construction of Unit 2 was viable thanks to a $380 million guarantee from the Rural Electrification Administration. Unit 3 started generating electricity in 2005. Its unit is named after EKPC board member E.A. "Ned" Gilbert. Unit 4 went online in 2009 and generates 278 MW of electricity. The unit cost $528 million to construct.

== Environmental mitigation ==
Units 3 and 4 utilize the circulating fluidized bed (CFB) process which adds limestone to its boilers. This results in lower emissions. In 2018, EKPC announced $262 million in upgrades to remain in compliance and to extend the plant's operation life. This includes replacing handling systems for the bottom ash and to construct a wastewater treatment plant for water used in Units 1 and 2's scrubbers.

== See also ==
- Coal mining in Kentucky
