= Kentucky Utilities =

American electric utility company

KU logo

Kentucky Utilities (KU) is based in Lexington, Kentucky, and provides electricity to 77 counties in Kentucky. KU also serves five counties in Virginia under the name Old Dominion Power. It is owned by LG&E and KU Energy, LLC, which, in turn, is owned by PPL Corporation.

== History ==
Kentucky Utilities was formed in 1912 to serve five areas of Kentucky. In 1926, KU acquired Old Dominion Power. KU was acquired by LG&E Energy, parent of Louisville Gas & Electric, in 1998. This combination was then acquired by British utility company Powergen in 2000, and ultimately Powergen was bought by German utility company E.ON in 2003. E.ON renamed LG&E Energy as E.ON U.S. In 2010, E.ON U.S. was bought by PPL Corporation, who changed the name of the company to LG&E and KU Energy.

The use of the plural Utilities refers to the company's early sales mix of electricity and other utilities, including ice, which in its early days of mass-production, was made in some areas by electric utilities. The company still owns a 4-story structure on the northeast side of Lexington on Loudon Avenue known as the "Ice House". The facility was utilized for cold storage by Kentucky Utilities during the time when ice was part of its "Utilities" portfolio of offerings. The adjacent property on North Limestone Street utilized a power generation facility to provide DC (direct current) power for the city's trolley system in the early 1900s. This trolley system used the current rail line separating the two properties, which is now owned and operated by R. J. Corman Railroad.

KU's facilities include the coal-fired generating station E. W. Brown Power Station, near Burgin, Kentucky. It sits adjacent to Lake Herrington, which was formed in 1926 by constructing Dix Dam, which contained hydro-electric generators. The company's electric distribution dispatch was located in Lexington until the consolidation of Louisville (LG&E) and Lexington (KU) distribution dispatch centers in 2019. Legacy Kentucky Utilities power generation facilities include Pineville Station (located in Fourmile, KY) and Tyrone Station (located near Frankfort, KY). These facilities have been demolished as of early 2020. Other facilities include various Customer Business Office locations, Electric Distribution Operations Centers, Service Center and Storerooms scattered across the state and throughout the KU and ODP service territory.

== Acquisition by PPL Corporation ==
PPL and E.ON announced on April 28, 2010, a definitive agreement under which PPL would acquire E.ON US, the parent company of KU and Louisville Gas & Electric, for $7.625 billion. The sale was closed on November 1, 2010.
