= National Register of Historic Places listings in Powell County, Kentucky =

Location of Powell County in Kentucky

This is a list of the National Register of Historic Places listings in Powell County, Kentucky.

This is intended to be a complete list of the properties and districts on the National Register of Historic Places in Powell County, Kentucky, United States. The locations of National Register properties and districts for which the latitude and longitude coordinates are included below, may be seen in a map.

There are 16 properties and districts listed on the National Register in the county.

This National Park Service list is complete through NPS recent listings posted June 13, 2025.

== Current listings ==
	Name on the Register	Image	Date listed	Location	City or town	Description
1	Amburgy Hollow Petroglyphs		January 2, 1992 (#91001885)	Off Kentucky Route 613 atop the northern side of Amburgy Hollow; 37°50′53″N 83°41′42″W	Nada	
2	Anderson Site		August 14, 1975 (#75000820)	Address Restricted	Stanton	
3	Branham Ridge Petroglyphs (15PO158)		January 2, 1992 (#89001198)	Address Restricted	Vaughn's Mill	
4	Clay City National Bank Building	Clay City National Bank Building	July 13, 1976 (#76000940)	6th Ave. 37°51′38″N 83°55′16″W	Clay City	
5	Haystack Rock Shelter		August 14, 1975 (#75000821)	Address Restricted	Stanton	
6	High Rock Petroglyphs (15PO25)		September 8, 1989 (#89001201)	Between Cat Creek Rd. and the High Rock Lookout Tower; 37°47′16″N 83°46′42″W	Nada	
7	Martin Fork Petroglyphs		January 2, 1992 (#91001886)	Off Tunnel Ridge Rd. along the Daniel Boone Trail; 37°48′25″N 83°39′32″W	Nada	
8	Martin Site		August 14, 1975 (#75000822)	Address Restricted	Stanton	
9	McKinney Bluff Petroglyphs (15PO107)		September 8, 1989 (#89001199)	Address Restricted	Nada	
10	Nada Tunnel 1 Petroglyphs		April 20, 1992 (#92000342)	Address Restricted	Nada	
11	Nada Tunnel 2		January 2, 1992 (#91001883)	Address Restricted	Nada	
12	Raised Spirits Rockshelter		March 15, 2005 (#05000144)	Address Restricted	Slade	Site of a hunting camp, where objects such as triangular arrowheads, ceramic jars, cornhusks, corn kernels, cut cane, and cordage were left by ancient peoples. Included in Red River Gorge District.
13	Red River Gorge District		September 12, 2003 (#03000919)	Includes the confluence of Gladie Creek with the Red River; 37°50′12″N 83°36′44″W	Daniel Boone National Forest	A large area in the national forest with extensive archaeological resources, having 442 contributing sites including numerous rock shelters. Extends also into Menifee County and Wolfe County.
14	Seldon Skidmore Site		August 14, 1975 (#75000823)	Address Restricted	Stanton	
15	Shepherd Site		August 13, 1975 (#75000819)	Address Restricted	Slade	
16	State Rock Petroglyph Site (15PO106)		September 8, 1989 (#89001200)	Address Restricted	Furnace	
17	White's Rockshelter Petroglyphs		January 2, 1992 (#91001884)	Address Restricted	Knowlton	

== See also ==
- List of National Historic Landmarks in Kentucky
- Nada Tunnel
- National Register of Historic Places listings in Kentucky
