= Nada Tunnel =

Tunnel in Kentucky, United States

Coordinates: 37°49′2″N 83°40′51″W

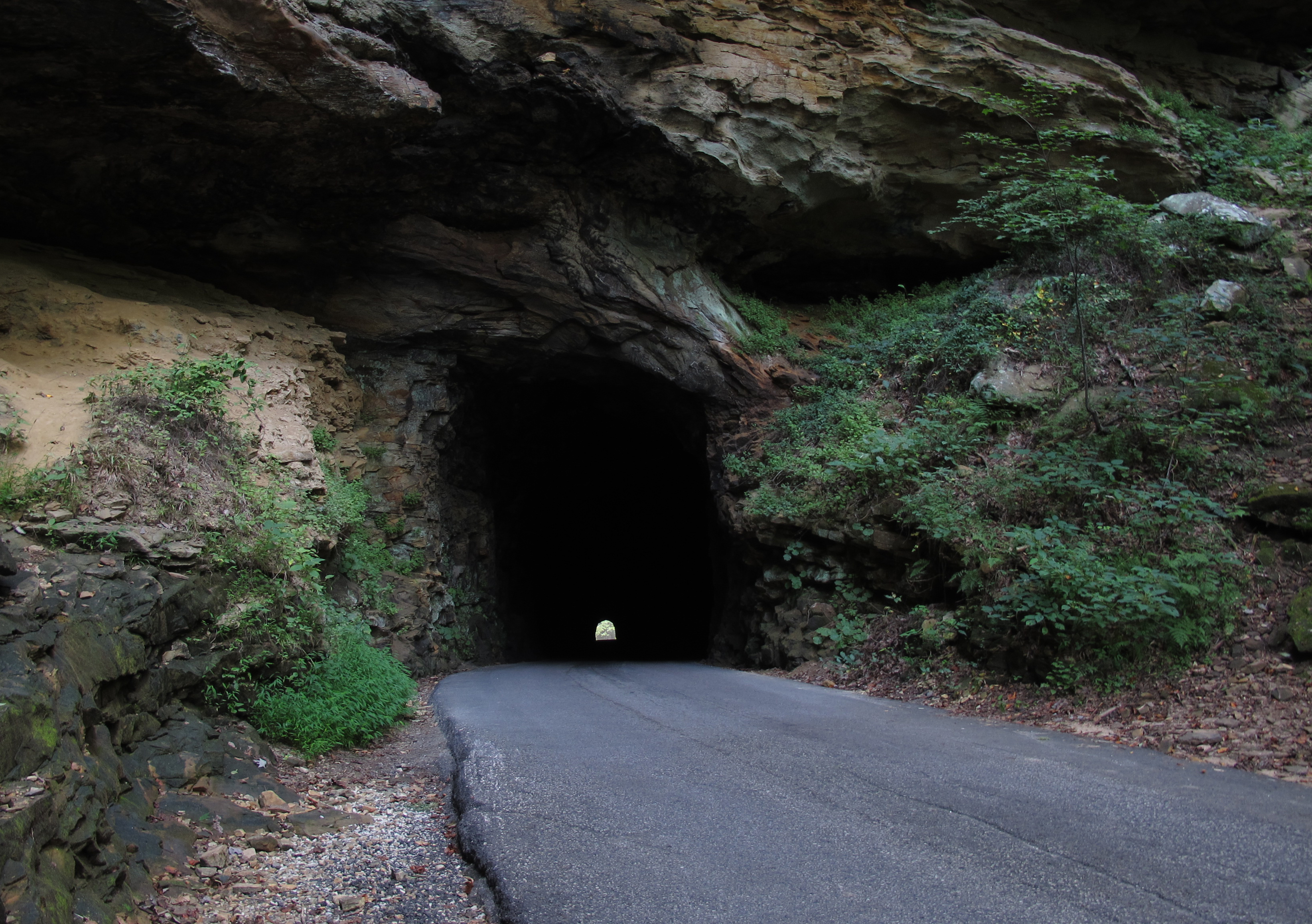
- The Nada Tunnel in 2010
- Interactive map of Nada Tunnel

Overview
- Location: Powell County, Kentucky, U.S.

Operation
- Opened: 1911
- Owner: Dana Lumber Company

Technical
- Length: 900 feet (270 m)
- Tunnel clearance: 13 feet (4.0 m)

Nada Tunnel is an historic 900-foot (270 m) long tunnel along Kentucky Route 77 in Powell County, Kentucky, in the United States. Formerly a railway tunnel, the tunnel has often been described as the "Gateway to Red River Gorge" for the shortcut it provides motorists to the Red River Gorge canyons of the Daniel Boone National Forest.

Built for the Dana Lumber Company between 1910 and 1911, Nada Tunnel (pronounced nay-duh by locals) was named after Nada, Kentucky, then a logging town about 10 miles (16 km) past the tunnel's entrance. Solid sandstone was blasted with dynamite and dug out with steam machinery and hand tools, with two teams working from each side of the ridge.

The tunnel's original dimensions were 12 by 12 feet (3.7 m × 3.7 m), but when the first train load of logs became stuck and had to be blasted free, the tunnel's height was increased to 13 feet (4.0 m). Narrow gauge steam locomotives of the Big Woods, Red River & Lombard Railroad regularly hauled timber extracted from the vast forests of the Red River Valley through the tunnel, to a sawmill 15 miles (24 km) away in Clay City.

Once the forests had been cleared, the timber companies pulled out of the area. The railroad tracks were removed and a dirt road was laid in the unlit tunnel in order to accommodate horse and pedestrian traffic. Nada Tunnel has since been paved to carry a single lane of road traffic.

Nada Tunnel lends its name to two prehistoric Native American rock art sites, namely "Nada Tunnel 1 Petroglyphs" and "Nada Tunnel 2", which were listed on the National Register of Historic Places in 1992.

== Myths and legends ==
There is a local legend that the Nada Tunnel is haunted by a ghost of a former tunnel construction worker who perished when a stick of dynamite exploded when being thawed at a nearby fire.

== Gallery ==
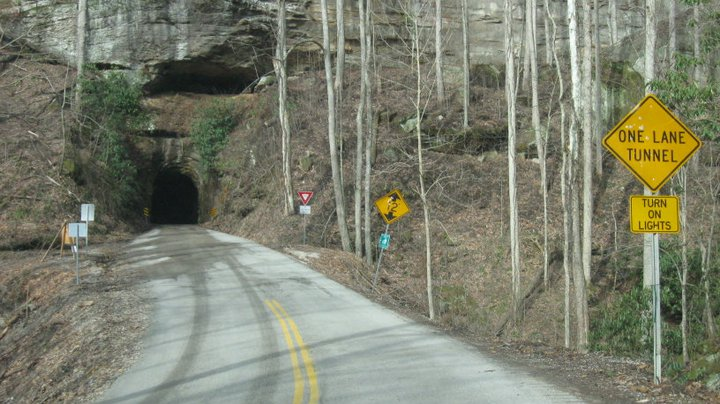
Portal of the Nada Tunnel

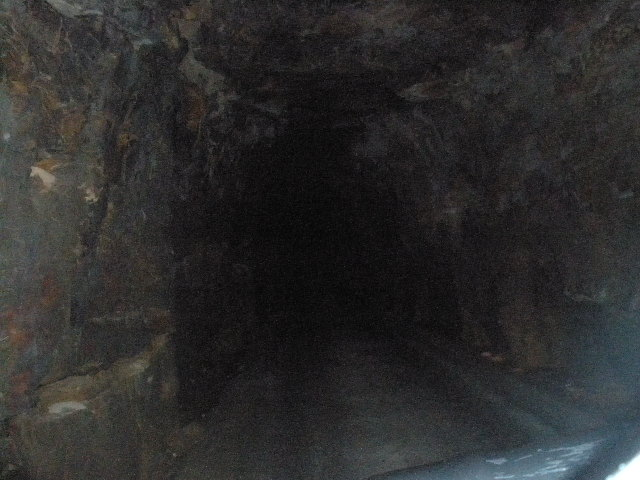
Inside the unlit tunnel
