= Piggville, Kentucky =

Unincorporated community in Kentucky, United States

Piggville
- Unincorporated community
- Location within the state of Kentucky Piggville (the United States)
- Coordinates: 37°51′51″N 83°54′24″W
- Country: United States
- State: Kentucky
- County: Powell
- Elevation: 748 ft (228 m)
- Time zone: UTC-6 (Central (CST))
  - Summer (DST): UTC-5 (CST)
- GNIS feature ID: 2420715

Piggville is an unincorporated community in Powell County, Kentucky, United States.
