= Red River Gorge Climbers' Coalition =

Kentucky rock climbing association

Red River Gorge Climbers' Coalition (RRGCC)
- Company type: Local Climbing Orgization
- Founded: 1996
- Headquarters: Eastern Kentucky, United States
- Area served: Red River Gorge Region
- Members: 500+
- Website: rrgcc.org

The Red River Gorge Climbers' Coalition (RRGCC) is an advocacy group for rock climbers in the Red River Gorge, Kentucky. It owns over 1,829 acres (7.40 km^{2}) of world renown climbing and protected forest, mostly in the Daniel Boone National Forest.

== History ==
The Red River Gorge Climbers' Coalition was founded by local climbers Shannon Stuart-Smith and Kris Snyder in November 1996 as a local climber's advocacy group to protect climbing at the Red River Gorge. Rock climbing in the Red River Gorge area had originally occurred primarily on the public lands of Daniel Boone National Forest and was therefore subject to the jurisdiction of the U.S. Forest Service. In 1996 the Forest Service issued for the first time ever a Rock Climbing Management Guide for the Red River area. This guide, or RCMG, was viewed negatively by climbers. As a direct result of the issuance of the RCMG, Shannon and Kris decided to form a climbers' coalition to champion climbers' interests and to try to improve relations between the Forest Service and climbers. Their main concern was twofold, re-writing the RCMG to include climbers' input and thereby "improving" it and educating and empowering climbers to ensure the long-term future of climbing.

The RRGCC has grown to a several hundred member all volunteer advocacy group that continues to work with the US Forest Service on ensuring access to climbing in the Daniel Boone National Forest. The Coalition has also expanded its efforts to include working with the Natural Bridge State Park, and many local private land owners as well. On February 7, 2000, the Red River Gorge Climbers' Coalition and the U.S. Forest Service signed a Memorandum of Understanding.

== Pendergrass-Murray Recreational Preserve (PMRP) ==
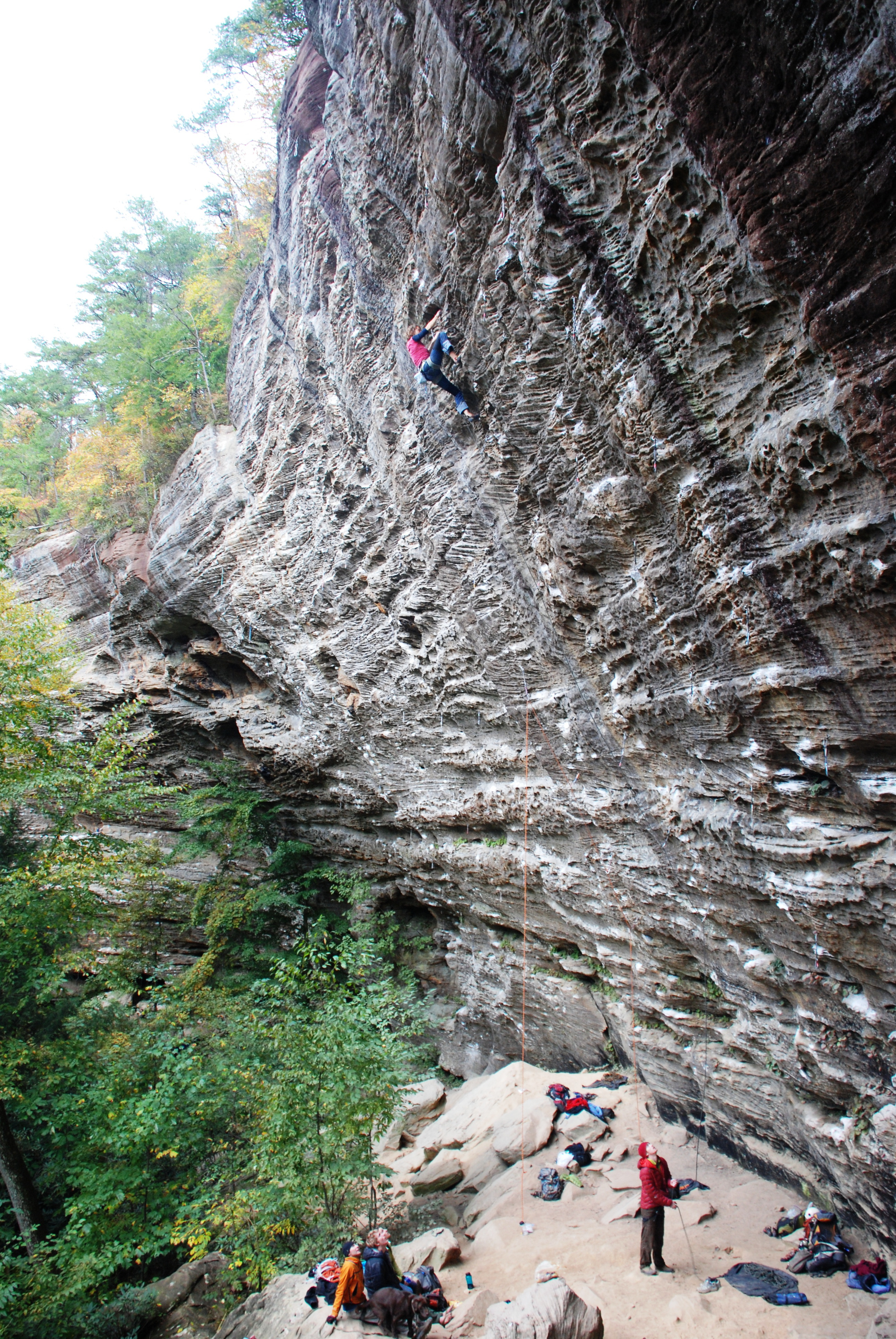
Climber on Convicted (5.13a) in The Motherlode area

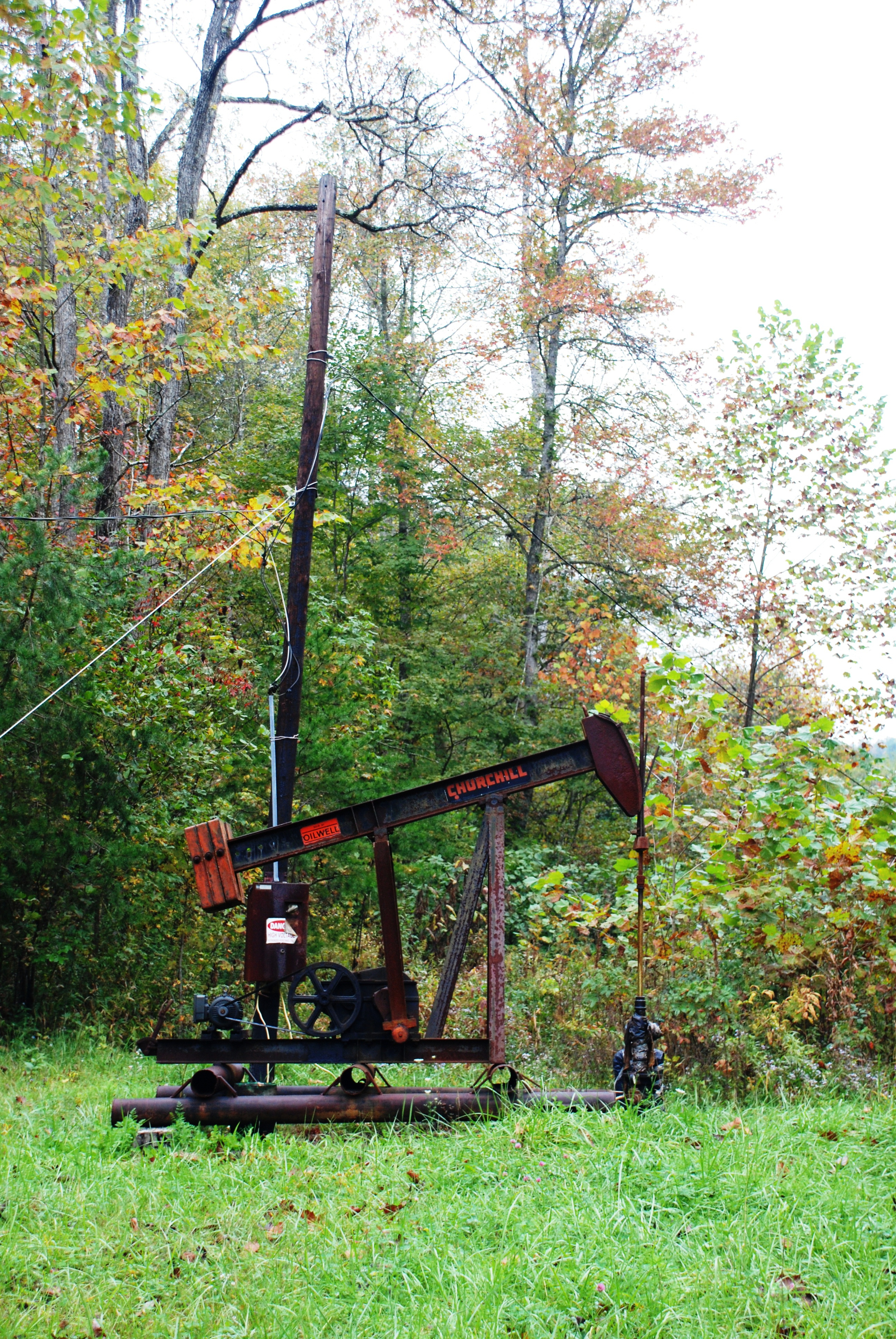
One of the numerous pumpjacks within PMRP

The Pendergrass-Murray Recreational Preserve, or the PMRP, is 727 acres (2.94 km^{2}) of land now owned and maintained by the RRGCC. This land, now open to the public, is a commitment to preserving and sustaining climbing access in the Red River Gorge indefinitely.

In the 1990s, as climbing grew in popularity as a sport, the RRGCC Coalition formed with the intent of permanently securing access to climbing in the Red River Gorge region. However, being on the East Coast, most of the climbing opportunities were available only on private property or Forest Service land. In 1996, the USFS enacted a bolting ban on its land, effectively ending the development of sport climbing in those areas.

In the late 1990s and early 2000s, the potential for development, particularly sport climbing, was discovered in the Southern Region, where steep sandstone walls are overhanging and pocketed and offer technical, dynamic, and endurance climbing. As word spread and climbers flocked to the Bald Rock Fork and Coal Bank Hollow areas, conflicts arose between climbers and oil companies in the region, especially related to limited parking causing road blocks. The first well known and developed areas "The Motherlode" lies on private land just outside PMRP (See BRRP below). With over 50 routes in 5.11-5.14 range, it is one of the most well known destination for hard climbing in the region. Other climbing areas in PMRP hosts more than 500 climbs, ranging from 5.4 to 5.14d.

In 2004, when more than 750 acres (3.0 km^{2}) of land in the Southern Region came available, the RRGCC, recognizing the opportunity to secure access in the area, moved quickly to purchase the land. Negotiating with the Murray family, the Coalition and the Murray's reached an agreement and the ownership of the land was transferred to the RRGCC. To finance the purchase, the RRGCC worked out an owner-financed mortgage of 8% a year for 10 years. With a few maintenance costs, the final yearly costs translate to nearly $30,000 per year. The last mortgage payment was made in 2012, and the RRGCC fully owns the PMRP. The payments are financed from private donations and from support of The Access Fund, a national climbing advocacy organization.

== Miller Fork Recreational Preserve (MFRP) ==
Sitting just east of the PMRP, across Kentucky Route 11, is the Miller Fork Recreational Preserve, 418 acres (1.69 km^{2}) of land now owned by the RRGCC. In May 2012 the RRGCC, with the help of The Access Fund, closed a deal on acquiring this land. The RRGCC now owns the land fully after completing payments in 2017.

Ray Ellington's newest book, Miller Fork Climbing, released in October 2015, explores the hundreds of new routes along the walls of the MFRP.

== Bald Rock Fork Recreational Preserve (BRRP) ==
In January 2017 the RRGCC purchased 102 acres of land that include "the Motherlode", "the Chocolate Factory", "The Bear's Den" and "the Unlode". The purchase of this area secured access to 226 routes, ranging from 5.2 to 5.14c.

== Cave Fork Recreational Preserve (CFRP) ==
In 2025, RRGCC purchased 718 acres of land, which was all part of Ashland WMA, for $1.7 million. 582 acres (2.36 km^{2}) of this land became the CFRP. The remaining land was added to PMRP and MFRP.

== Rocktoberfest ==
Rocktoberfest is an annual event held by the Red River Gorge Climbers' Coalition located in the Red River Gorge. This event is a place for climbers to come together to share their enthusiasm for rock climbing and celebrate the ownership of the Pendergrass-Murray Recreation Preserve, which was finally purchased in 2012 by the RRGCC. It is held in October, hence the name "Rocktoberfest". It typically lasts three days, during which many events are held that include exclusive films, climbing clinics, live music, and various competitions. Rocktoberfest 2013 took place from October 11–13 in the Red River Gorge.

== Events ==
- Clinics held for climbers to hone their skills and learn from professionals
- Yoga sessions in the morning for climbers
- The Reel Rock Tour is Saturday night
- Bouldering and roped climbing competitions are held
- Food is provided as well and parties at night
