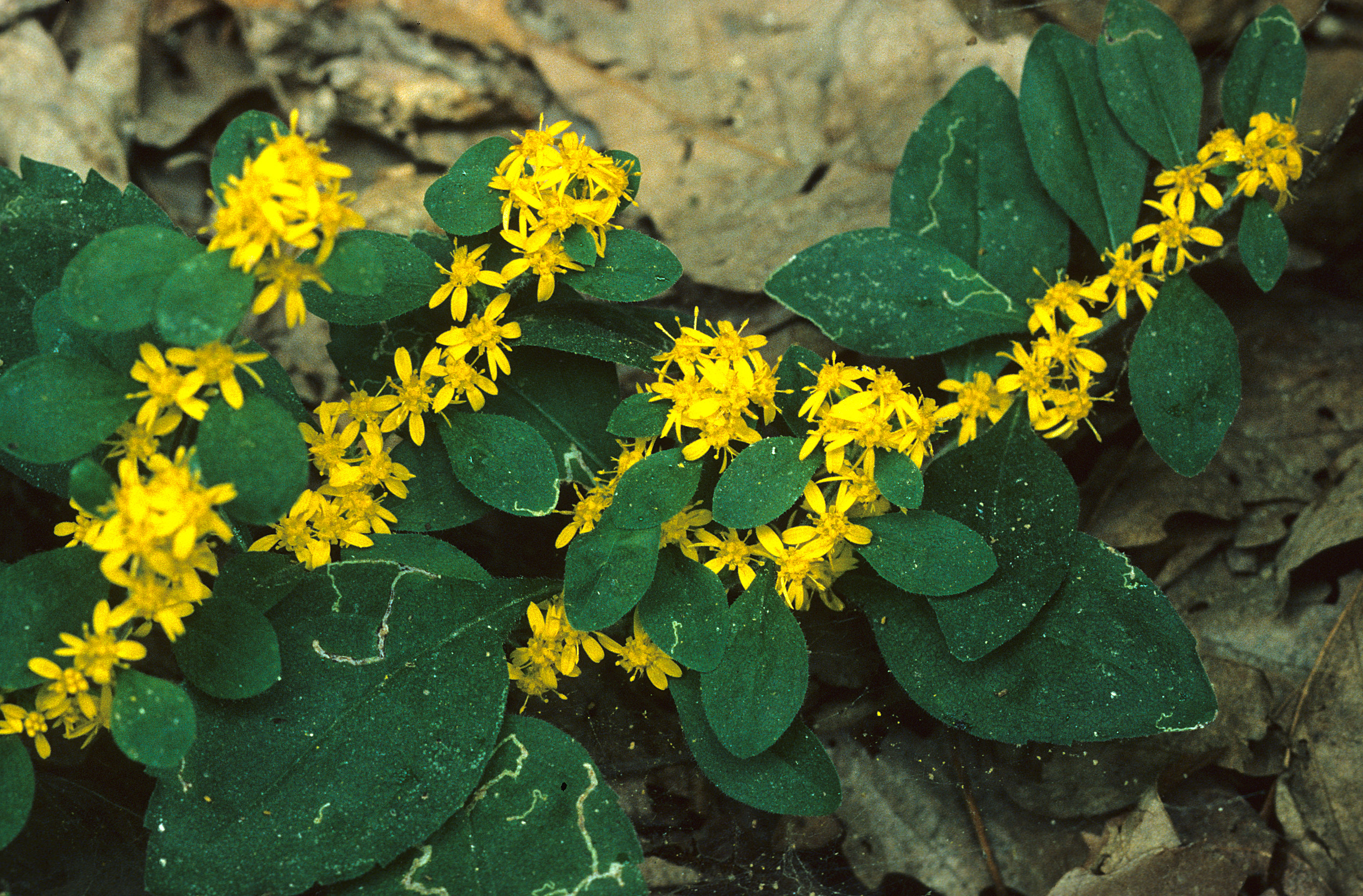

Conservation status
- Imperiled (NatureServe)

Scientific classification
- Kingdom: Plantae
- Clade: Tracheophytes
- Clade: Angiosperms
- Clade: Eudicots
- Clade: Asterids
- Order: Asterales
- Family: Asteraceae
- Genus: Solidago
- Species: S. albopilosa

Binomial name
- Solidago albopilosa E.L.Braun

= Solidago albopilosa =

Species of plant

Solidago albopilosa is a rare species of flowering plant in the family Asteraceae known by the common name whitehair goldenrod. It is a perennial herb that is endemic to the state of Kentucky in the southeastern United States. It is threatened by recreational activities in its habitat and is a federally listed threatened species of the United States.

== Distribution and habitat ==
This plant species is only found in Eastern Kentucky, in a single river canyon, the Red River Gorge. It grows there within the Daniel Boone National Forest, in Menifee, Powell, and Wolfe Counties. There it is limited to rock shelters, open caves with overhanging rock formations. It grows on sandy soil that has accumulated on the sandstone floors of the rock shelters. It grows behind the drip line, out of direct sunlight but not in the darkest shadows of the caves.

== Description ==
Solidago albopilosa is a perennial herb producing one or more erect stems from a woody caudex. It grows 30 to 50 centimeters (12 to 20 inches) tall but it can reach 1 meter (39 inches) in height. It is covered in white hairs.

The leaves have oval or spatula-shaped serrated blades up to 8 or 9 centimeters (3.1 or 3.5 inches) long by 4 or 5 cm (1.5 or 2 in) wide, becoming smaller toward the end of the stem. The leaf blades are "so thin that coarse print is readable through [them]."

The inflorescence is a cluster of up to 30 flower heads, each roughly half a centimeter (0.2 inches) long. The head contains three to five tiny yellow ray florets and a few disc florets. The fruit is up to half a centimeter (0.2 inches) long including its pappus. Blooming occurs in September through November.

=== Ecology ===
Other plants in this type of habitat and the surrounding forest include white baneberry (Actaea pachypoda), northern maidenhair fern (Adiantum pedatum), jack in the pulpit (Arisaema triphyllum), flowering dogwood (Cornus florida), yellow mandarin (Disporum lanuginosum), smooth hydrangea (Hydrangea arborescens), Indian cucumber-root (Medeola virginiana), Nepalese browntop (Microstegium vimineum), partridge berry (Mitchella repens), clearweed (Pilea pumila), Christmas fern (Polystichum acrostichoides), great rhododendron (Rhododendron maximum), poison ivy (Toxicodendron radicans), and maple-leaf viburnum (Viburnum acerifolium). Roundleaf catchfly (Silene rotundifolia), and littleflower alumroot (Heuchera parviflora) are common associates.

== Conservation ==
Conservation activities include the installation of small fences around the plants and the redirection of trails through less sensitive habitat.

The main threat to this species is damage to its habitat during recreational activities in this section of the Daniel Boone National Forest. Hiking, camping, and rock climbing are popular pursuits in the area. Trampling destroys the plants, compacts the soil, and damages the seeds and rhizomes. Explorers invade the rock shelters and build fires, dump garbage, spread the seeds of invasive plants like garlic mustard, and dig in the soil for archaeological artifacts. Logging opens the forest and increases light levels, decreases water, and increases the invasion of introduced species of plants, posing a further threat to the species.
