= Nada, Kentucky =

Unincorporated community in Kentucky, United States

Nada
- Unincorporated community
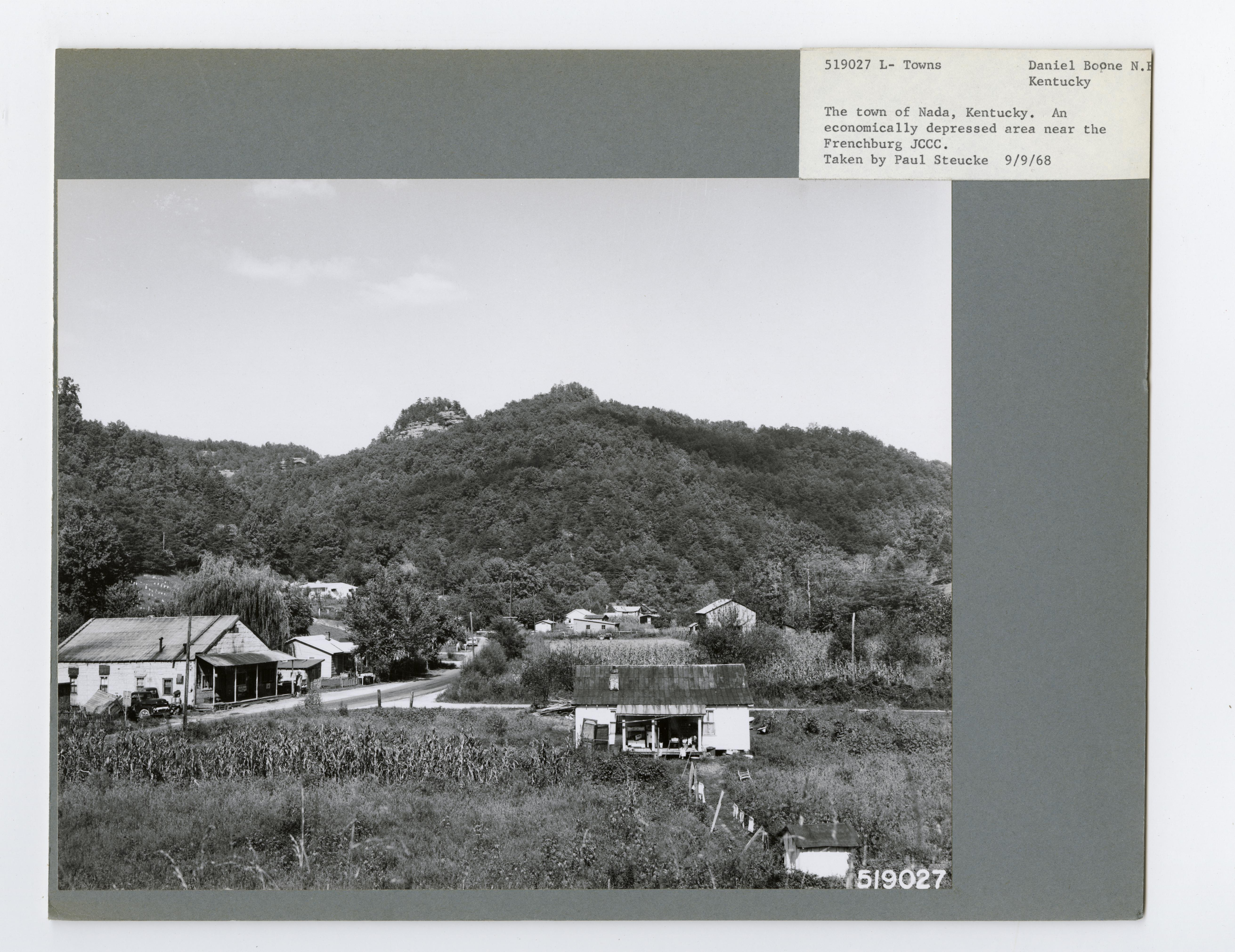
- Nada in 1968

- Location within the state of Kentucky Nada (the United States)
- Coordinates: 37°48′55″N 83°43′13″W
- Country: United States
- State: Kentucky
- County: Powell
- Elevation: 689 ft (210 m)

Population (2010)
  - Total: 52
- Time zone: UTC-5 (Eastern (EST))
  - Summer (DST): UTC-5 (EST)
- GNIS feature ID: 2420683

Nada is an unincorporated community in Powell County, Kentucky, United States.

== History ==
Nada had its start in the year 1911 when the railroad was extended to that point; a sawmill was built there the same year. The community lent its name to the nearby Nada Tunnel, originally a railroad tunnel completed in 1911. The post office serving Nada was called Lombard. This post office was established in 1901, and remained in operation until 1968.
