= Slade, Kentucky =

Unincorporated community in Kentucky, United States

Slade
- Unincorporated community
- Slade
- Motto: "Your hometown's meeting spot" (Unofficial)
- Location within the state of Kentucky Slade (the United States)
- Coordinates: 37°47′42″N 83°42′15″W
- Country: United States
- State: Kentucky
- County: Powell

Area
  - Total: 9.31 sq mi (24.11 km^{2})
  - Land: 9.31 sq mi (24.11 km^{2})
  - Water: 0 sq mi (0.0 km^{2})
- Elevation: 738 ft (225 m)

Population (2020)
  - Total: 107
  - Density: 11.5/sq mi (4.44/km^{2})
- Time zone: UTC-5 (Eastern (EST))
  - Summer (DST): UTC-5 (EST)
- ZIP codes: 40376
- GNIS feature ID: 515466

Slade is an unincorporated community in Powell County, Kentucky, United States. Its post office closed in 2004.

== Landmarks ==
The community is home to the Natural Bridge State Resort Park.

Slade is a popular location for accommodations for climbers of the Red River Gorge. The campground operated by Miguel's Pizza has been called Camp 4 of the East. Slade and the campground were featured in the 2004 documentary movie Red River Ruckus by Victory Productions.
