= Natural Bridge State Resort Park =

State park in Kentucky, United States

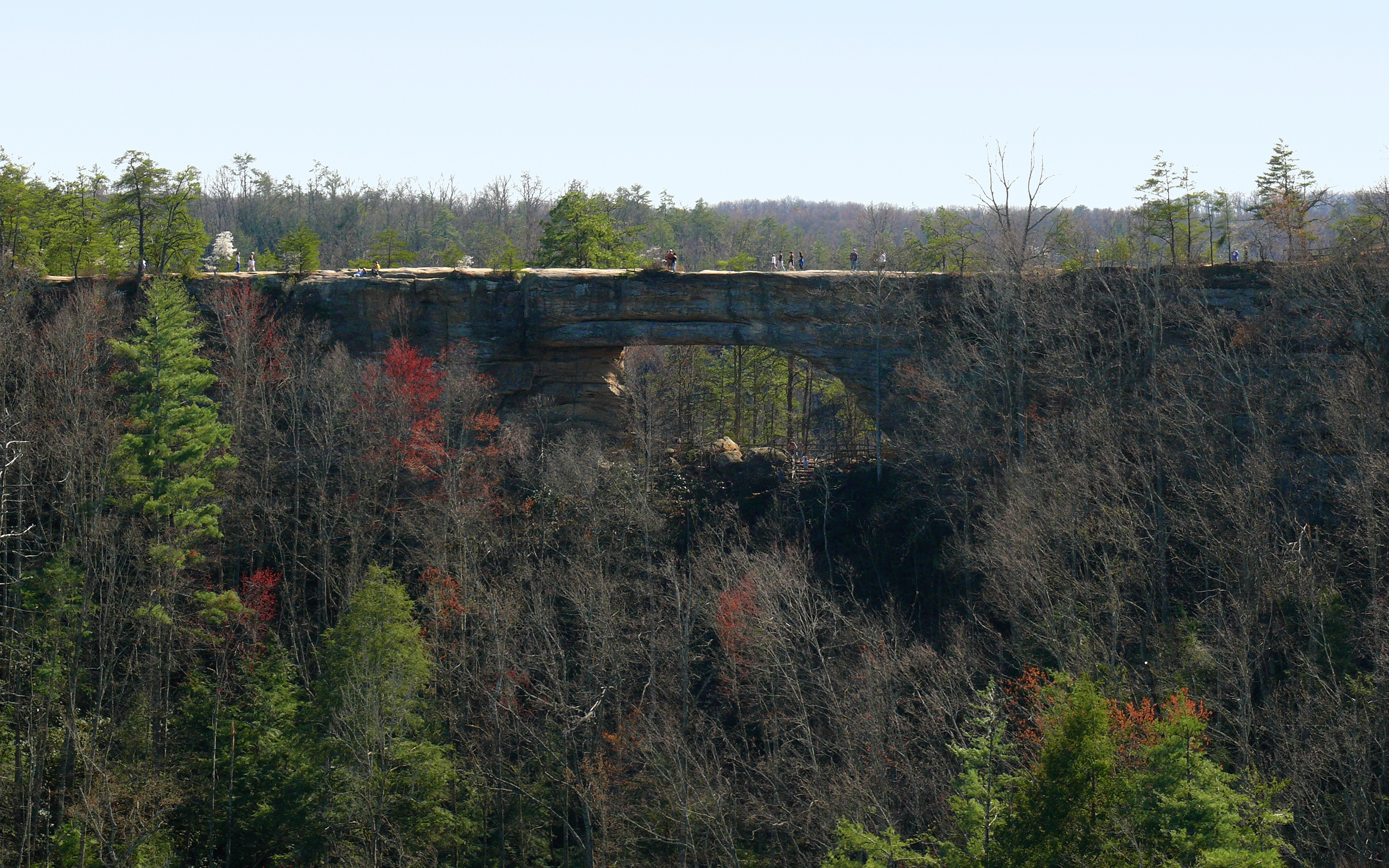
- Natural Bridge as viewed from Lookout Point

- Location within Kentucky Location within the United States
- Type: Kentucky state park
- Location: Powell and Wolfe counties, Kentucky, United States
- Coordinates: 37°46′37″N 83°41′00″W
- Area: 1,900 acres (770 ha)
- Established: 1926
- Administrator: Kentucky Department of Parks
- Website: Official website

Natural Bridge State Resort Park is a public recreation area located along the Middle Fork of the Red River, two miles south of the unincorporated community of Slade, in Powell and Wolfe counties, Kentucky, United States. The state park lies adjacent to the Red River Gorge geologic area and is surrounded by the Daniel Boone National Forest. Its namesake natural bridge is the centerpiece of the park. The natural sandstone arch spans 78 feet (24 m) and is 65 feet (20 m) high. The natural process of weathering formed the arch over millions of years. Some of the most famous sites in the park are the arch itself, "Lover's Leap", and "Fat Man's Squeeze".

The park is approximately 2,300 acres (930 ha), of which around 1,200 acres (490 ha) is dedicated by the Office of Kentucky Nature Preserves as a nature preserve. In 1981, this land was dedicated into the nature preserves system to protect the ecological communities and rare species habitat. The first federally endangered Virginia big-eared bats, Corynorhinus townsendii virginianus, recorded in Kentucky were found at Natural Bridge State Resort Park in the 1950s.

== History ==
The park was founded as a private tourist attraction in 1895 by the Lexington and Eastern Railroad. In 1910, Louisville and Nashville Railroad acquired the land when it purchased the Lexington and Eastern Railroad. In 1926, L&N's President Wible L. Mapother turned over its approximately 137 acres to the Kentucky State Park Commission, making it one of Kentucky's original four state parks when that system was established the same year.

== Trails ==
There are over 20 miles (32 km) of trails over uneven terrain from moderate to strenuous difficulty, including trails to White's Branch Arch, Henson's Cave Arch, and other scenic areas. The park's 0.5 miles (0.80 km) "Original Trail" to the natural bridge dates from the 1890s. Other trails include the 7.5 miles (12.1 km) Sand Gap Trail and the 0.75-mile (1.21 km) Balanced Rock Trail. Five miles (8 km) of the 307 miles (494 km) Sheltowee Trace National Recreation Trail run through the park, including the Whittleton Trail which connects the park to the Red River Gorge Geologic Area. "Fat Man's Squeeze", a narrow passage in the rock formation, leads to the bottom of the arch.

== Formations ==
Natural Bridge has several unique sandstone rock formations, including the Balanced Rock. This is a huge block of sandstone balanced on the edge of a cliff near the Natural Bridge. The "Balanced Rock", is located on Trail #2, not far above Hemlock Lodge. In the early days of the Park, it was called the Sphinx because, when viewed from the correct angle, it crudely resembles the Sphinx in Egypt. Although it is now called the Balanced Rock, it is in fact a pedestal rock - a single piece of stone that has weathered in such a fashion that its midsection is narrower than its cap or its base. This formation is one of the biggest and most perfectly formed examples of a pedestal rock east of the Rocky Mountains.

== Gallery ==
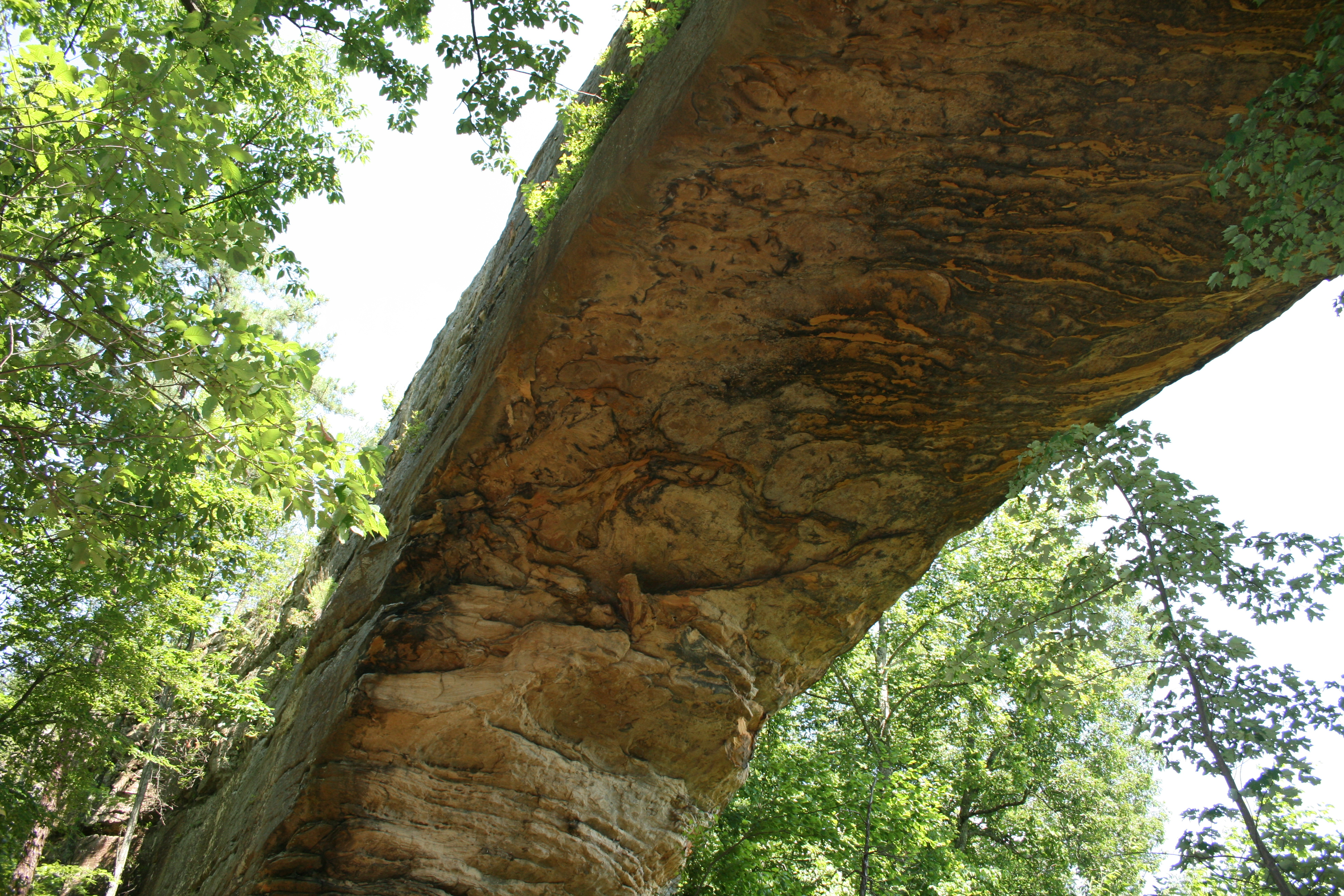
The natural arch of the bridge as seen from below.

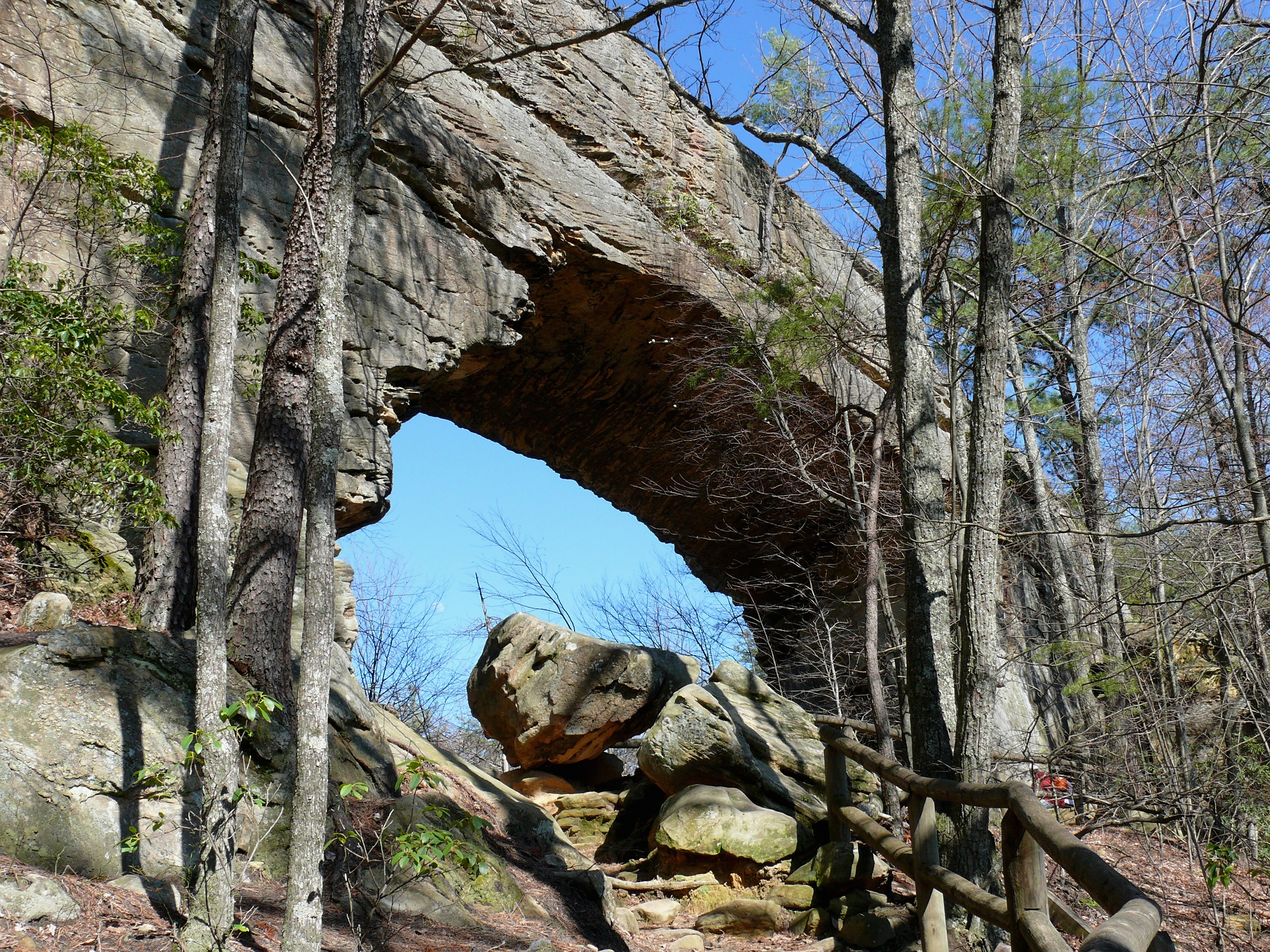
The bridge as seen at ground level.

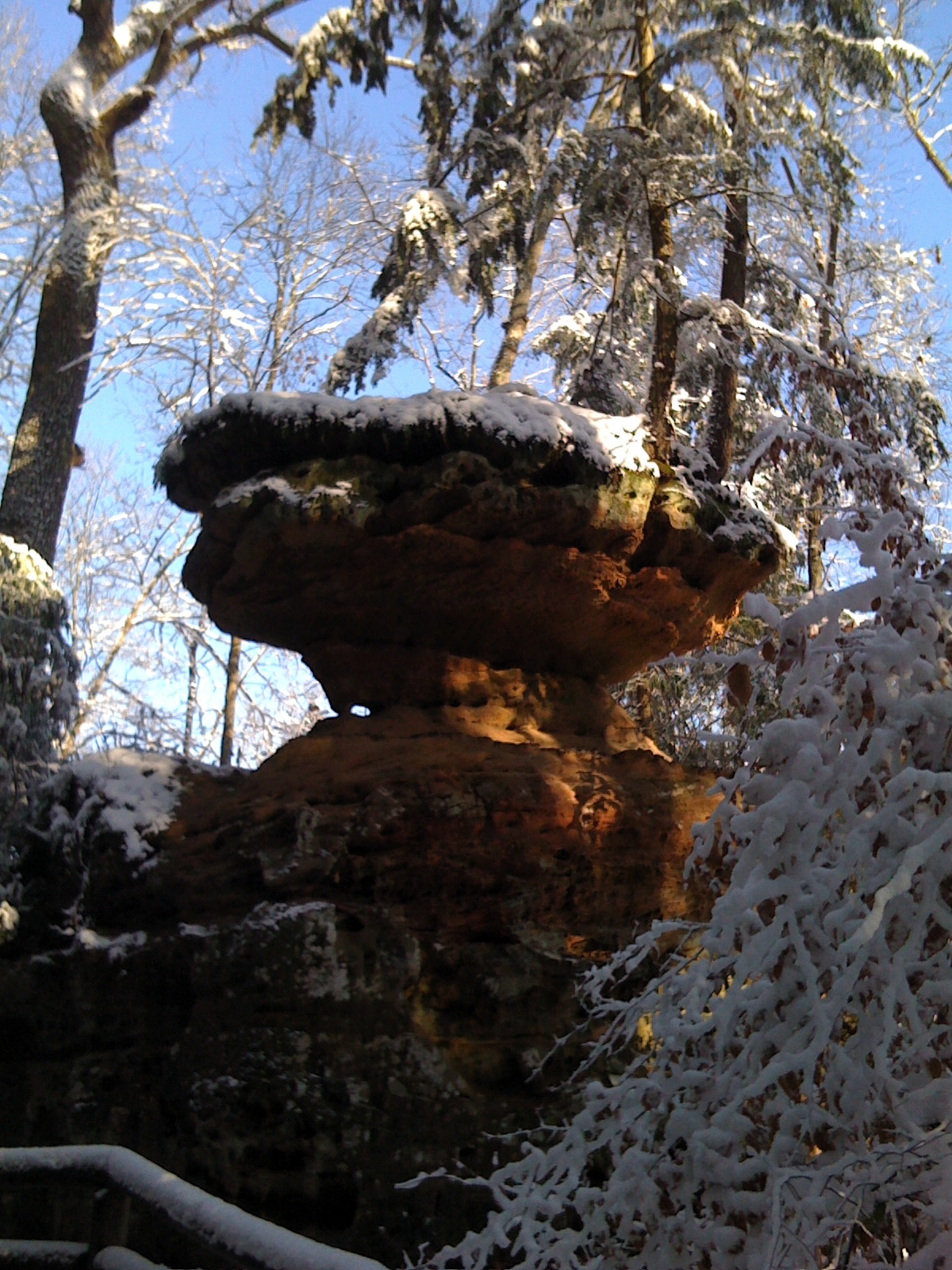
Balanced Rock on Trail #2.

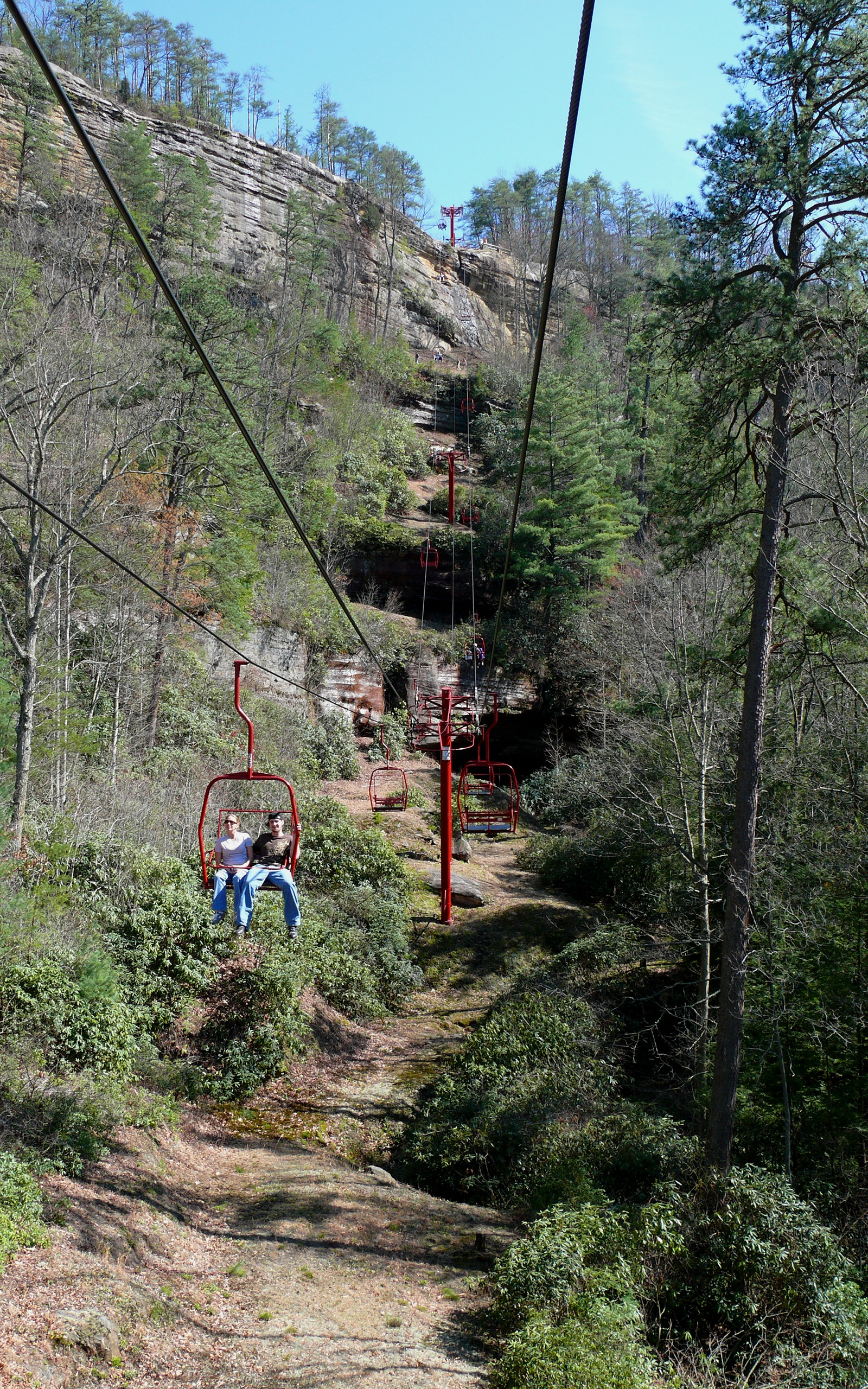
Sky Lift to the natural bridge area.

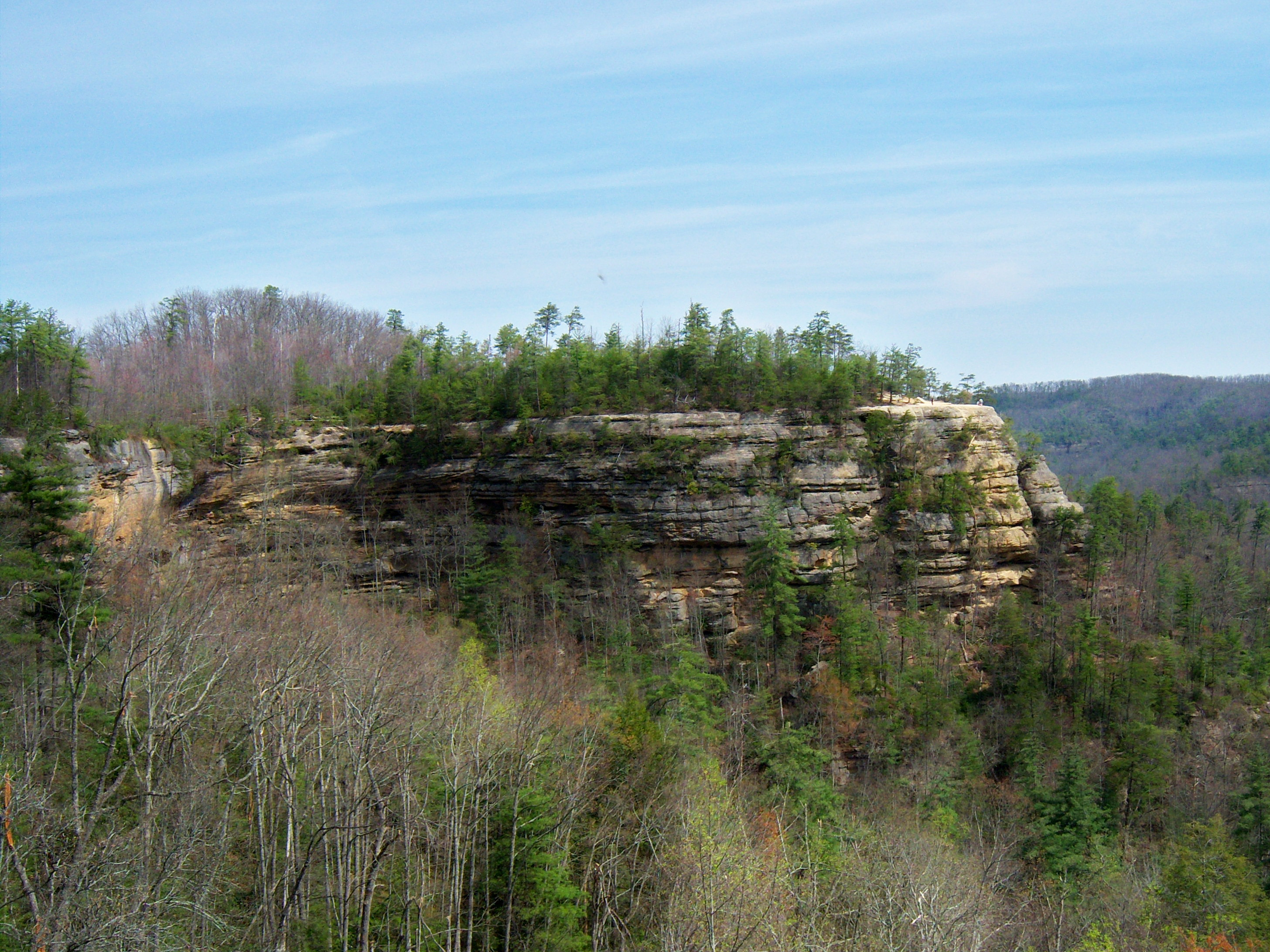
Rock cliff within the park.

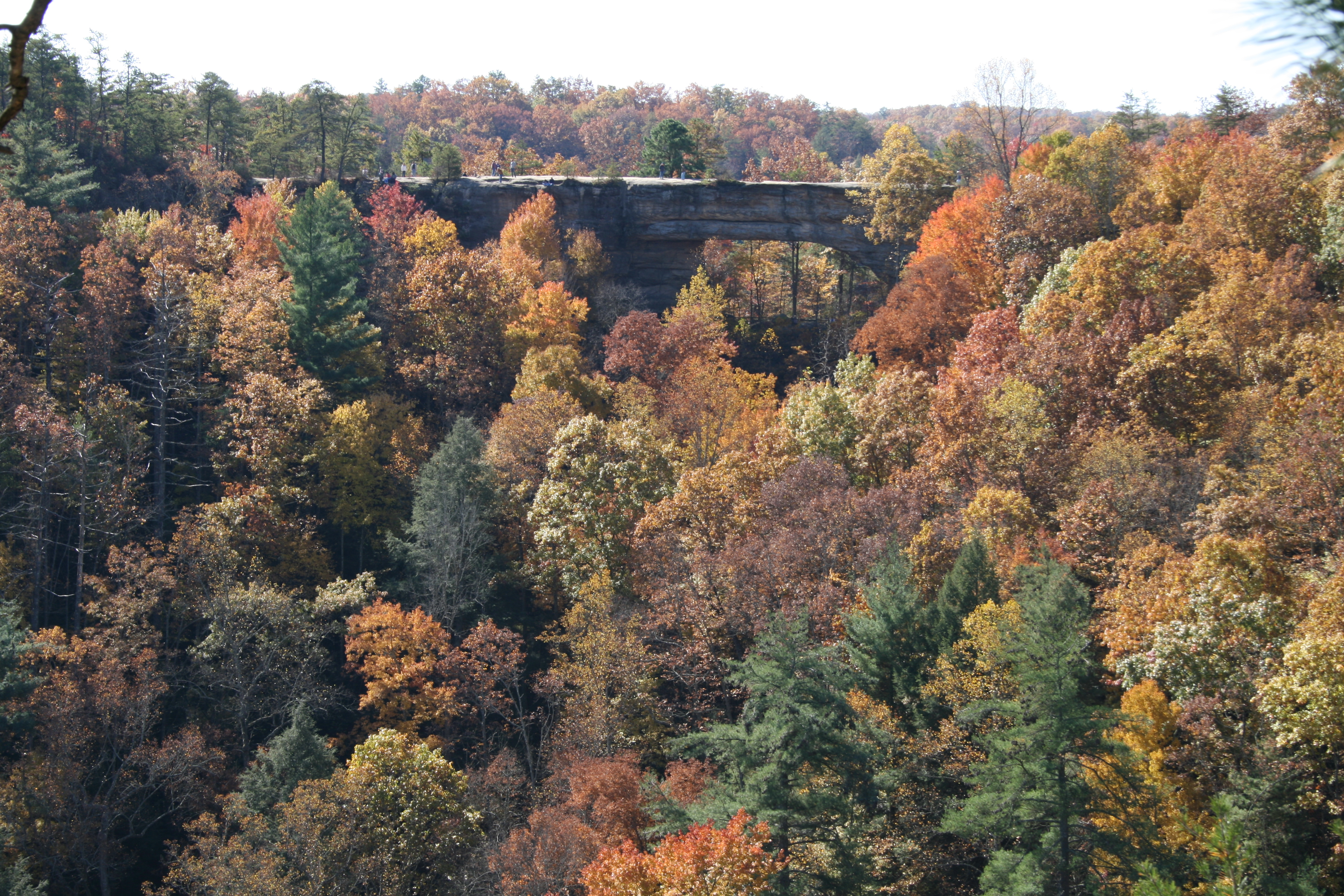
Natural Bridge in Autumn.
