= Powell County, Kentucky =

County in Kentucky, United States

- County
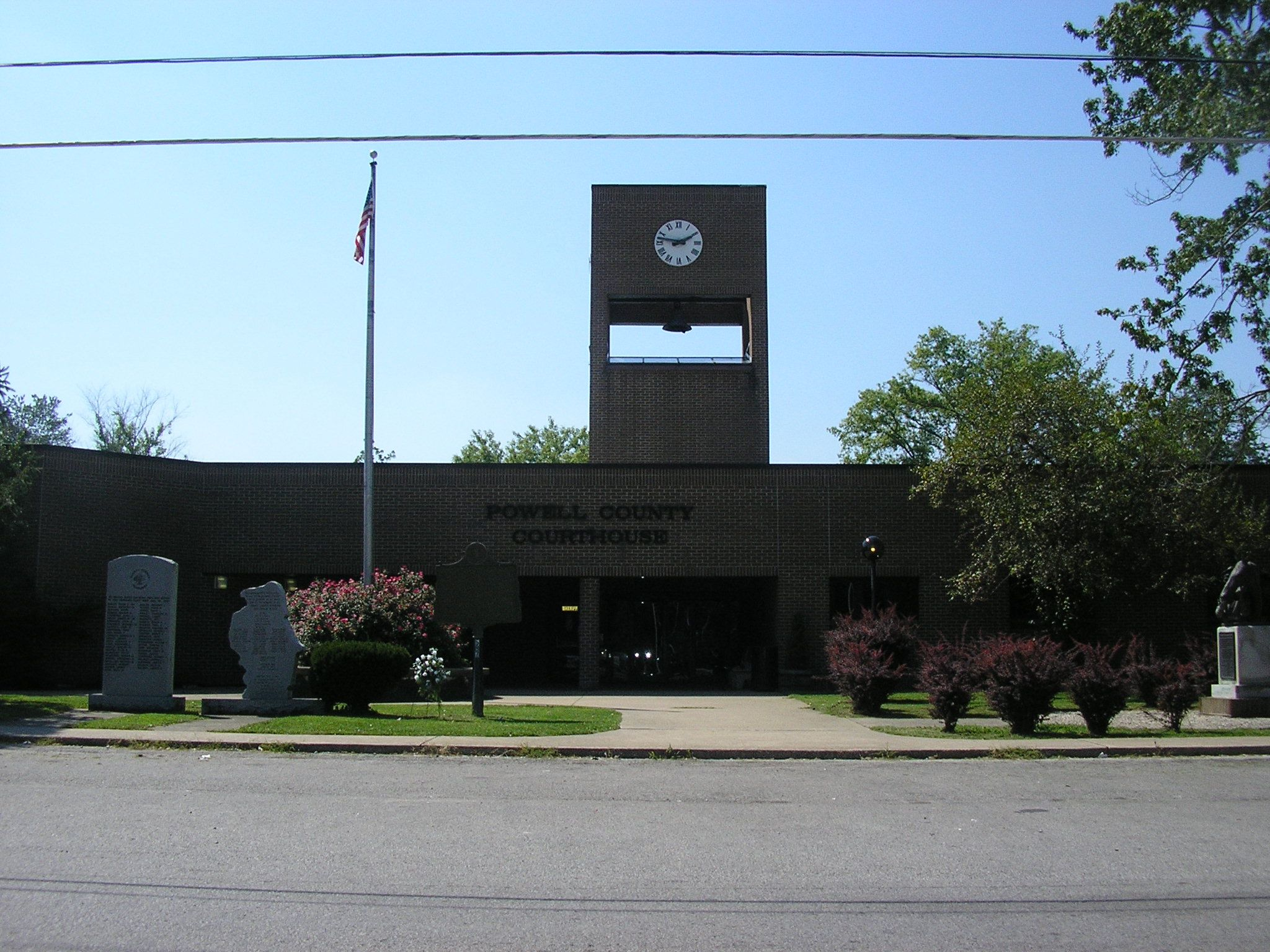
- Powell County courthouse in Stanton

- Location within the U.S. state of Kentucky
- Coordinates: 37°50′N 83°50′W
- Country: United States
- State: Kentucky
- Founded: 1852
- Named for: Lazarus W. Powell
- Seat: Stanton

Government
  - Judge/Executive: Edward Barnes (R)

Area
  - Total: 180 sq mi (470 km^{2})
  - Land: 179 sq mi (460 km^{2})
  - Water: 1.1 sq mi (2.8 km^{2}) 0.6%

Population (2020)
  - Total: 13,129
  - Estimate (2025): 12,812 ▼
  - Density: 73.3/sq mi (28.3/km^{2})
- Time zone: UTC−5 (Eastern)
  - Summer (DST): UTC−4 (EDT)
- Congressional district: 6th
- Website: powellcountyky.us

Powell County is a county located in the U.S. Commonwealth of Kentucky. As of the 2020 census, the population was 13,129. Its county seat is Stanton. The county was formed January 7, 1852, by Kentucky Governor Lazarus W. Powell from parts of Clark, Estill, and Montgomery counties. It is no longer a dry county as of 2018. Powell County is home to Natural Bridge State Resort Park and the Red River Gorge Geologic Area, two of Kentucky's most important natural areas and ecotourism destinations, as well as the Pilot Knob State Nature Preserve.

== Geography ==
According to the United States Census Bureau, the county has a total area of 180 square miles (470 km^{2}), of which 179 square miles (460 km^{2}) is land and 1.1 square miles (2.8 km^{2}) (0.6%) is water.

=== Adjacent counties ===
- Montgomery County (north)
- Menifee County (northeast)
- Wolfe County (southeast)
- Lee County (south)
- Estill County (southwest)
- Clark County (northwest)

=== National protected area ===
- Daniel Boone National Forest (part)

== Demographics ==
Historical population
Census	Pop.	Note	%±
1860	2,257		—
1870	2,599		15.2%
1880	3,639		40.0%
1890	4,698		29.1%
1900	6,443		37.1%
1910	6,268		−2.7%
1920	6,745		7.6%
1930	5,800		−14.0%
1940	7,671		32.3%
1950	6,812		−11.2%
1960	6,674		−2.0%
1970	7,704		15.4%
1980	11,101		44.1%
1990	11,686		5.3%
2000	13,237		13.3%
2010	12,613		−4.7%
2020	13,129		4.1%
2025 (est.)	12,812	▼	−2.4%
U.S. Decennial Census; 1790-1960 1900-1990; 1990-2000 2010-2020

=== 2020 census ===
As of the 2020 census, the county had a population of 13,129. The median age was 40.6 years. 23.5% of residents were under the age of 18 and 16.6% of residents were 65 years of age or older. For every 100 females there were 101.3 males, and for every 100 females age 18 and over there were 99.4 males age 18 and over.

The racial makeup of the county was 95.7% White, 0.5% Black or African American, 0.2% American Indian and Alaska Native, 0.2% Asian, 0.0% Native Hawaiian and Pacific Islander, 0.7% from some other race, and 2.7% from two or more races. Hispanic or Latino residents of any race comprised 1.5% of the population.

0.0% of residents lived in urban areas, while 100.0% lived in rural areas.

There were 5,065 households in the county, of which 32.2% had children under the age of 18 living with them and 26.9% had a female householder with no spouse or partner present. About 26.4% of all households were made up of individuals and 11.4% had someone living alone who was 65 years of age or older.

There were 5,587 housing units, of which 9.3% were vacant. Among occupied housing units, 68.2% were owner-occupied and 31.8% were renter-occupied. The homeowner vacancy rate was 1.6% and the rental vacancy rate was 5.4%.

=== 2000 census ===
As of the census of 2000, there were 13,237 people, 5,044 households, and 3,783 families residing in the county. The population density was 74 per square mile (29/km^{2}). There were 5,526 housing units at an average density of 31 per square mile (12/km^{2}). The racial makeup of the county was 98.56% White, 0.62% Black or African American, 0.12% Native American, 0.05% Asian, 0.07% from other races, and 0.58% from two or more races. 0.66% of the population were Hispanic or Latino of any race.

There were 5,044 households, out of which 36.10% had children under the age of 18 living with them, 58.20% were married couples living together, 12.40% had a female householder with no husband present, and 25.00% were non-families. 21.80% of all households were made up of individuals, and 8.30% had someone living alone who was 65 years of age or older. The average household size was 2.60 and the average family size was 3.02.

In the county, the population was spread out, with 26.60% under the age of 18, 9.50% from 18 to 24, 30.00% from 25 to 44, 23.30% from 45 to 64, and 10.60% who were 65 years of age or older. The median age was 35 years. For every 100 females there were 99.40 males. For every 100 females age 18 and over, there were 95.00 males.

The median income for a household in the county was $25,515, and the median income for a family was $30,483. Males had a median income of $26,962 versus $18,810 for females. The per capita income for the county was $13,060. About 18.90% of families and 23.50% of the population were below the poverty line, including 31.00% of those under age 18 and 20.00% of those age 65 or over.

== Politics ==
United States presidential election results for Powell County, Kentucky
Year	Republican		Democratic		Third party(ies)	
Year	No.	%	No.	%	No.	%
1912	381	31.83%	647	54.05%	169	14.12%
1916	587	43.68%	757	56.32%	0	0.00%
1920	835	44.32%	1,038	55.10%	11	0.58%
1924	724	42.87%	939	55.60%	26	1.54%
1928	1,160	61.31%	732	38.69%	0	0.00%
1932	826	38.69%	1,300	60.89%	9	0.42%
1936	998	45.43%	1,185	53.94%	14	0.64%
1940	989	43.57%	1,266	55.77%	15	0.66%
1944	902	46.71%	1,023	52.98%	6	0.31%
1948	719	41.51%	975	56.29%	38	2.19%
1952	992	44.83%	1,218	55.04%	3	0.14%
1956	1,339	49.87%	1,343	50.02%	3	0.11%
1960	1,508	57.34%	1,122	42.66%	0	0.00%
1964	993	37.83%	1,622	61.79%	10	0.38%
1968	1,157	42.57%	934	34.36%	627	23.07%
1972	1,766	58.40%	1,230	40.67%	28	0.93%
1976	1,148	37.90%	1,859	61.37%	22	0.73%
1980	1,716	45.55%	2,006	53.25%	45	1.19%
1984	2,269	58.83%	1,575	40.83%	13	0.34%
1988	2,128	49.98%	2,113	49.62%	17	0.40%
1992	1,809	35.89%	2,323	46.08%	909	18.03%
1996	1,526	36.00%	2,156	50.86%	557	13.14%
2000	2,258	51.77%	2,008	46.03%	96	2.20%
2004	2,687	54.17%	2,249	45.34%	24	0.48%
2008	2,837	57.06%	2,065	41.53%	70	1.41%
2012	2,766	61.73%	1,620	36.15%	95	2.12%
2016	3,513	70.87%	1,272	25.66%	172	3.47%
2020	4,041	73.41%	1,367	24.83%	97	1.76%
2024	4,092	76.22%	1,174	21.87%	103	1.92%

In recent federal elections, Powell County has been reliably Republican.

=== Elected officials ===
Elected officials as of January 3, 2025
U.S. House	Andy Barr (R)	KY 6
Ky. Senate	Brandon Smith (R)	30
Ky. House	Bill Wesley (R)	91

== Natural Bridge State Resort Park ==
Powell County is home to Natural Bridge State Resort Park. The park is abundant with Native American relics, shelters, and burial grounds. The main attraction is the bridge itself, a natural arch with more than 15 million pounds (6,800 t) of rock in suspension. It is 30 feet (9.1 m) wide at the top and 85 feet (26 m) at the base; one of the more than 70 natural arches located in the area.

== Communities ==
=== Cities ===
- Clay City
- Stanton (county seat)

=== Unincorporated community ===
- Slade
- Bowen
- West Bend
- Virden
- Knowlton
- Nada
- Roslyn
- Vaughns Mill

== See also ==
- National Register of Historic Places listings in Powell County, Kentucky
