= Red River Gorge =

Protected natural area in Kentucky, United States

Red River Gorge Geological Area
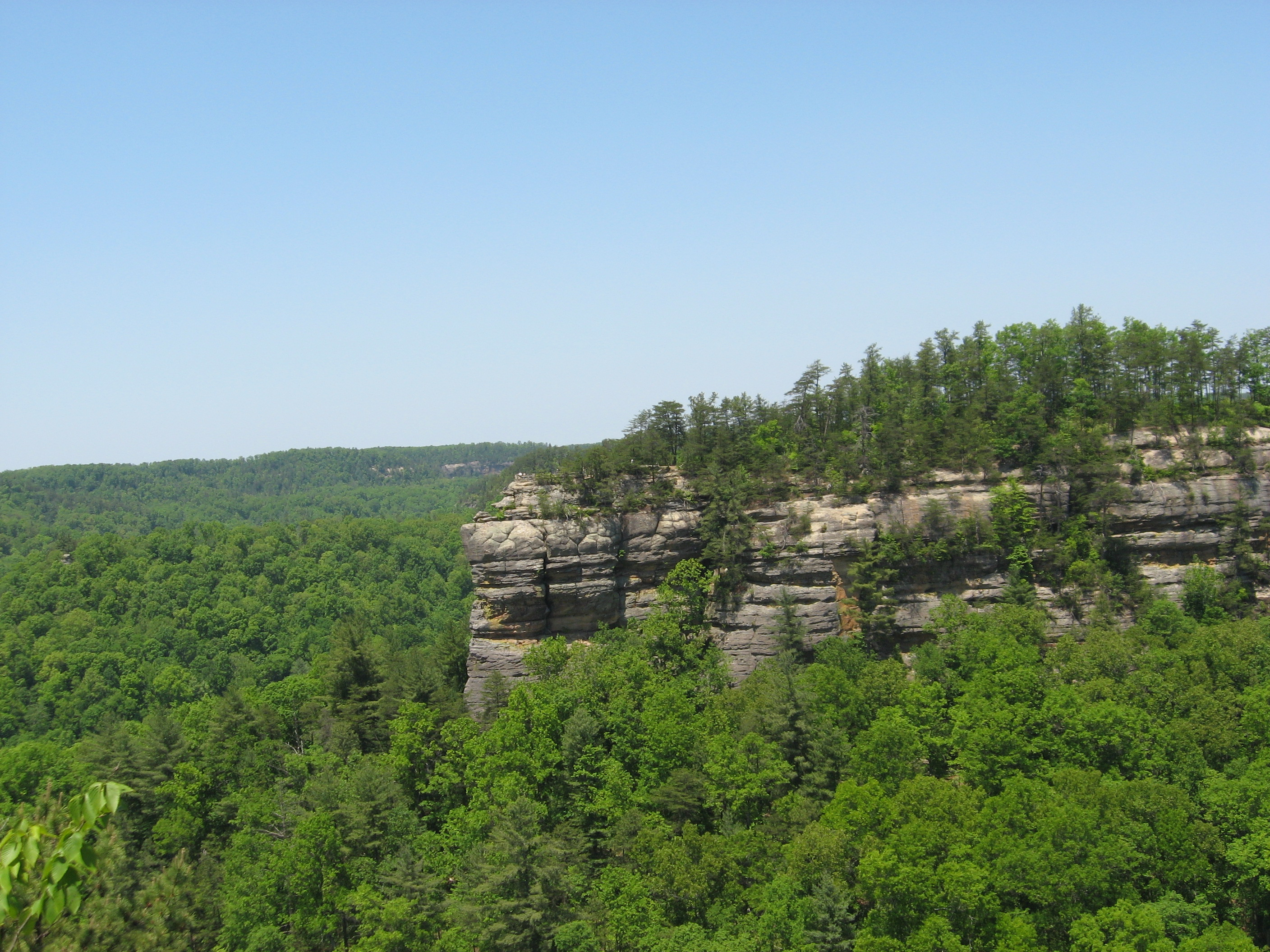
- Chimney Top Rock

- Location within Kentucky
- Location: Slade, Kentucky, United States
- Coordinates: 37°50′2″N 83°36′28″W
- Area: 29,000 acres (120 km^{2})
- Established: February 1937
- Governing body: United States Forest Service
- Website: www.fs.usda.gov/detail/dbnf/specialplaces/?cid=stelprdb5345319

U.S. National Natural Landmark
- Designated: 1975

The Red River Gorge is a canyon system on the Red River in east-central Kentucky, United States. Geologically it is part of the Pottsville Escarpment.

The gorge lies within the Daniel Boone National Forest and was subsequently designated the Red River Gorge Geological Area, an area of around 29,000 acres (12,000 ha; 120 km^{2}; 45 sq mi). It was designated a National Natural Landmark and National Archaeological District in 1976, and listed on the National Register of Historic Places. The 13,379-acre (5,414 ha; 54.14 km^{2}; 20.905 sq mi) Clifty Wilderness Area lies entirely within the geological area in the Red River Gorge.

This intricate canyon system features an abundance of high sandstone cliffs, rock shelters, waterfalls, and natural bridges. There are more than 100 natural sandstone arches in the Red River Gorge Geological Area. The multitude of sandstone and cliff-lines helped this area become one of the world's top rock climbing destinations and is home to the Red River Gorge Climbers' Coalition. The area is nicknamed the Red or the Gorge by climbers.

Kentucky's Natural Bridge State Park is immediately adjacent to this area, featuring one of the largest natural bridges in the Red River Gorge.

The section of the Red River in the upper gorge is also a legally designated Kentucky Wild River by the Kentucky General Assembly through the Office of Kentucky Nature Preserves' Wild Rivers Program.

Because of its unusual and rugged nature, the Red River Gorge features a variety of ecological zones.

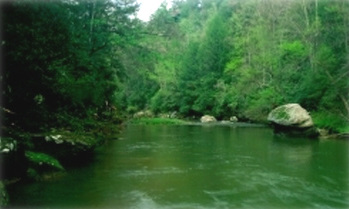
Red River in Wolfe County, Kentucky.

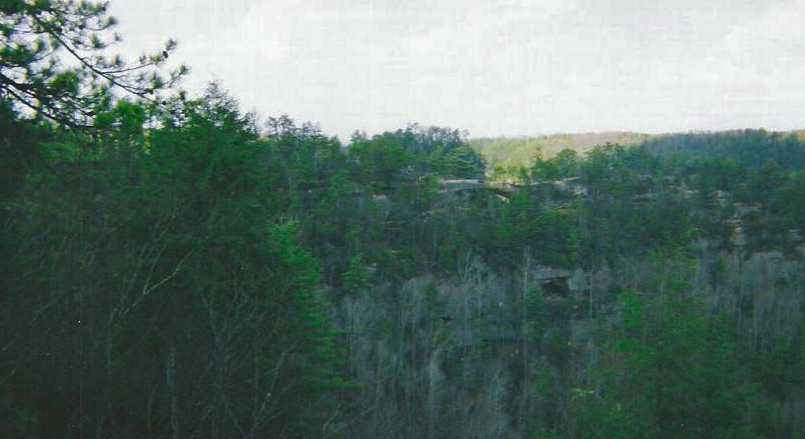
Red River Gorge has over 100 natural sandstone arches.

== History ==
=== Ancient history ===
The Red River Gorge area covers 442 known archaeological and historic sites. Rockshelters comprise a large portion of this number. The rockshelters of the gorge held evidence of prehistoric occupation, commonly including the use of hearths. Several of these rockshelters are named for their historical significance, including the Cloudsplitter, Newt Kash, Haystack, and Rogers shelters. Petroglyphs of animals can be found in many of these shelters as well.

Archaeologists have found large amounts of evidence for hunter-gatherer societies using the gorge as hunting grounds as well a temporary home. Notable finds include atlatl, stone tools, mortar and pestles, and woven storage containers. Storage pits were also found in great quantities. They commonly held plants, early medicines, nuts, tools, and other raw materials like wood or leather.

The area also shows the development of Native American societies. Archaeological evidence shows human occupation from over 12,000 years ago. Using various dating techniques, archaeologists have been able to date the clay storage vessels and stone tools found here to determine when certain pieces were made and used. When compared chronologically, the archaeological evidence provides support for larger claims about the ancient (to relatively modern) Native Americans.

The Red River Gorge and the surrounding area is believed to be one of the earliest examples of plant domestication.

=== Nada Tunnel ===
Nada Tunnel is a 900-foot-long (270 m), 12-foot-wide (3.7 m), and 13-foot-high (4.0 m) logging tunnel built between 1910 and 1912. Rock and dirt were removed by dynamite, steam drills, and hand tools. One man was killed during tunnel construction when he attempted to thaw frozen dynamite which exploded when he set it near a fire.

The tunnel has often been described as the "Gateway to Red River Gorge" for the shortcut it provides motorists.

=== History of the proposed Red River Gorge Dam ===
The Red River's tendency to flood offered downstream residents much misery. In 1962 the "Great Flood of Clay City," the worst seen in 102 years, moved both government officials and local communities to lobby the Kentucky State Legislature and the Kennedy administration for immediate construction of a flood control dam. The United States Congress ultimately approved the measure and provided funding. The Army Corps of Engineers set about their business of making the structure a reality; however, many felt that such actions would destroy the unique ecosystem residing in the dam inundation area. The Sierra Club spearheaded the formation of a group opposed to the construction of the dam. This group obtained the help of Supreme Court Justice William O. Douglas by participating in a Dam Protest Hike which drew local and national attention to the situation. The Dam Protest Hike took place on November 18, 1967, at the Clifty Wilderness area junction of Swift Camp Creek and the Red River, Highway 715.

In 1971, the University Press of Kentucky commissioned Wendell Berry, a Kentucky native farmer and author to write a book, The Unforeseen Wilderness, advocating the preservation of the gorge in its natural state.

The struggle of wills lasted several decades, and involved two proposed dam sites. It finally concluded with Red River's entry into the National Wild and Scenic River system on December 3, 1993, when President Bill Clinton signed "H.R.914 - Red River Designation Act of 1993," into law. The bill was sponsored by U.S. Representative Hal Rogers and provides federal protection for a 19.4-mile (31.2 km) section of the river. This legislation precluded the construction of any dam on the Red River, helping to preserve the Gorge as it exists today.

=== Motion pictures ===
The Red River Gorge's Sky Bridge appears in the 1955 film The Kentuckian, starring and directed by Burt Lancaster.

=== Folk lore and mythology ===
The Red River Gorge has been the site of several reported supernatural occurrences. The most notable of them being the well-known Bigfoot and the lesser-known Man-Wolf. Since the 1980s there have been several supposed sightings and reports of Bigfoot; however, none were ever confirmed.

The Man-Wolf sightings hold more credibility. The several dozen reports since the 1990s come together to describe it as seven to eight feet tall while standing on two legs, glowing yellow or red eyes, hands (not paws) with long claws, and a range of grey to black fur. It is also said to hunt deer and eat roadkill.

Most of these sightings can be attributed to the area's black bear population and a good bit of misunderstanding. However, in 2024, a large "dog-like" creature was shot not far from Red River Gorge in Munfordville, Kentucky. The animal was later DNA tested by the National Wildlife Research Center in Colorado and was determined to be a federally endangered gray wolf. This fueled the Man-Wolf myth since gray wolves have been considered extirpated from Kentucky since the 19th century.

== Geology ==
The Red River Gorge is distinguished by its extensive sandstone cliffs, rock shelters, and other geologic formations shaped over millions of years through the processes of erosion and weathering. It contains the highest concentration of natural arches of any region east of the Mississippi River. Sandstone in the Red River Gorge exhibits prominent iron-oxide banding, where groundwater has redistributed and precipitated iron-rich minerals into red, orange, and brown Liesegang patterns that influence the hardness of the Corbin Sandstone.

== Biology and ecology ==
The Red River Gorge Geological Area, including Clifty Wilderness, has a very diverse biology. The Gorge is home to a great variety of wildlife including hawks, owls, woodpeckers, hummingbirds, deer, fox, black bears, and two venomous snakes: the copperhead and the timber rattlesnake. In total, Red River Gorge sports 67 species of reptiles and amphibians, 46 species of mammals, and 100 species of birds. It is also home to several endangered species including the Indiana Bat, the Virginia Big-Eared Bat, the Red-Cockaded Woodpecker, and white-haired goldenrod which is found only in Red River Gorge. Experts believe that plants of Canadian origin were established in the Red River Gorge area during the Pliocene-Quaternary glaciation which started about 2.58 million years ago. These plants grow in the gorge's sheltered canyons and include diverse species such as purple fringed orchid Platanthera psycodes, Canadian lily Lilium canadense, and Canadian yew Taxus canadensis.

== Archaeology ==
Rock shelters and other sites in the Red River Gorge Geological Area contain artifacts of prehistoric occupancy by indigenous people, beginning with the Paleoindian period. Rock shelters are particularly valuable as archeological sites because they are protected from weathering related to precipitation. Plant materials and other relics, such as woven mats and leather moccasins that would decompose in more typical sites are well-preserved in the dry, nitrate-rich soils found in rock shelters. Sites in the area yielded some of the earliest evidence of the domestication of plants found in the eastern United States.

Archaeological evidence from the Red River Gorge indicates that prehistoric peoples were using the area for hunting, gathering, and plant processing. Through excavations of rock shelters and surrounding sites, evidence has found artifacts such as stone tools, including projectile points, scraping tools, and cutting tools. Found also are features such as hearths and storage pits. These findings provide insight into the subsistence practices and use of the landscape overtime.

Archaeological evidence from the Red River Gorge also indicates that the region played a significant role in the development of agriculture in Eastern North America. The Pottsville Escarpment region contains evidence of the Eastern Agricultural Complex, an independent center of plant domestication that came about during the late archaic and Early Woodland periods. Findings show that Indigenous populations cultivated native plant species such as goosefoot (Chenopodium berlandieri), marsh elder (Iva annua), erect knotweed (Polygonum erectum), maygrass (Phalaris caroliniana), little barley (Hordeum pusillum), sunflower (Helianthus annuus), and squash (Cucurbita pepo). The presence of these domesticated and semi-domesticated plants indicates a transition from wild foraging to plant management and cultivation.

Archaeological research in the Red River Gorge has shown that the region contains a high amount of archeological sites, particularly with its sandstone rockshelters. The methods used are surveying and excavation, recording site locations, features, and material remains across the landscape. Surveys that have been conducted have discovered hundreds of prehistoric and historic sites, which depict long-term use of the gorge. Modern archeological analysis has shown that many of these sites have been impacted by modern, recreational use, including looting and the disturbance of archaeological deposits. Studies have shown that a majority of the sites show damage, which highlights the vulnerability of cultural resources.

The Red River Gorge, Clifty Wilderness, and the Indian Creek area were designated as a National Archaeological District and placed on the National Register of Historic Places in 2003. The National Register district covers 37,217 acres (15,061 ha) of land; as of 2005, it included 29,116 acres (11,783 ha) in the national forest and 8,101 acres (3,278 ha) of private land. It contains 664 known prehistoric and historic sites that date from more than 11,000 years ago to the 20th century; 442 sites are contributing sites in the National Register district.

== Clifty Wilderness ==
Clifty Wilderness is a 13,379-acre (54.14 km^{2}; 20.905 sq mi) wilderness area contained entirely within the Red River Gorge Geological Area.

== Recreation ==
=== Rock climbing ===
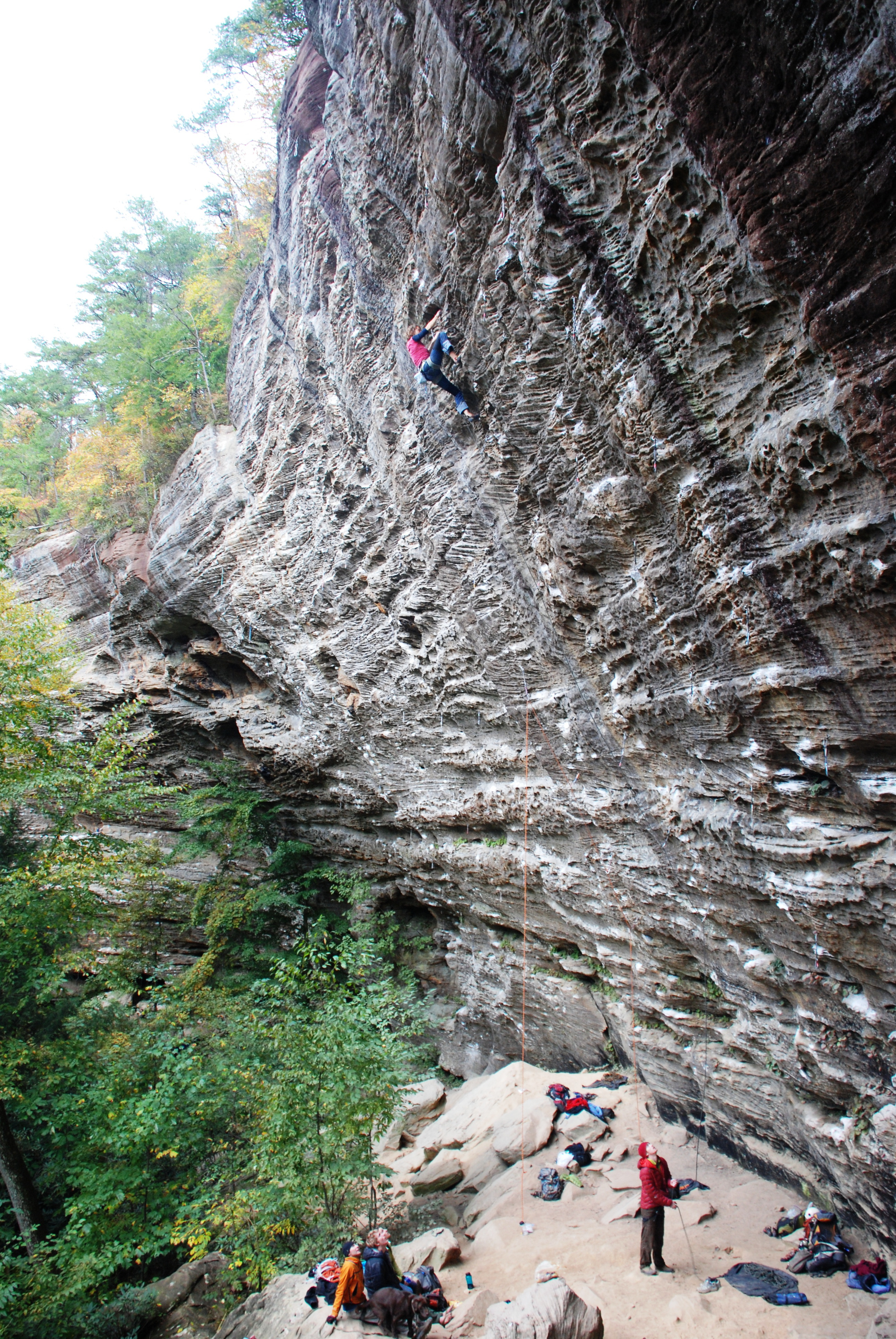
Rock climbing in The Motherlode area of Red River Gorge

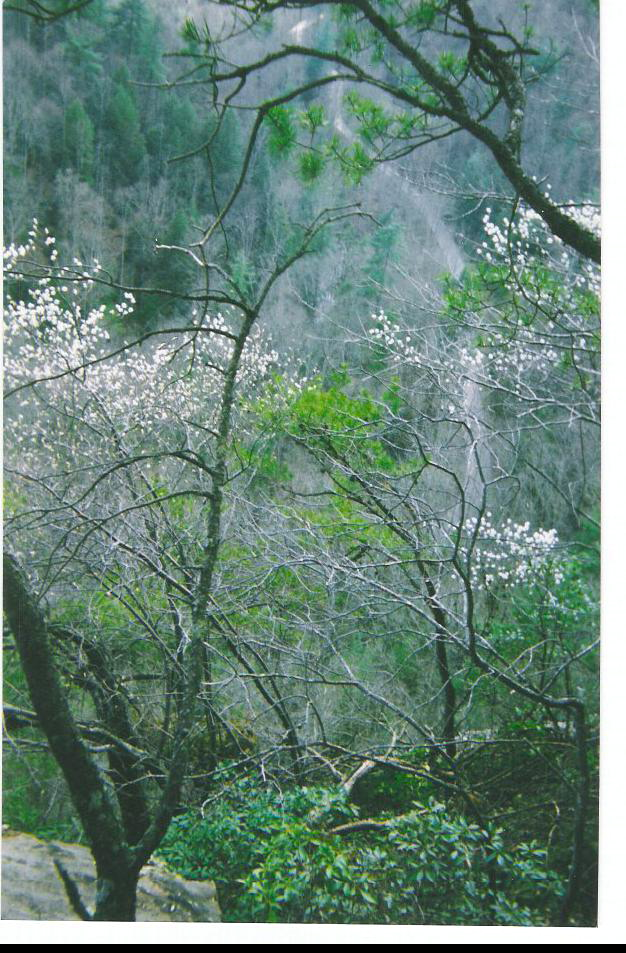
the lone road through the gorge, seen from a ridge top trail

The Red River Gorge is a popular destination for rock climbers. The area has numerous cliffs in the gorge and in the surrounding areas. The vast number of bolted routes in overhanging, pocketed sandstone draws climbers from all over the world to "the Red" as it is known. Climbing in the region is often done at many separate small cliffs. Most climbs are a single pitch and most cliffs are less than 200 ft (61 m) tall. There are numerous traditional and sport climbing routes in the region, although the latter are more dominant. Many cliffs lie within Daniel Boone National Forest; however several important cliffs are located on private land and in privately owned preserves created to allow climbing access. Among the private preserves are:

1. Pendergrass-Murray Recreational Preserve is a 750-acre (3.0 km^{2}) preserve owned and maintained by Red River Gorge Climbers' Coalition.
2. Muir Valley is a 400-acre (1.6 km^{2}) nature preserve and rock climbing area owned and maintained by Friends of Muir Valley thanks to a generous donation of land, labor, and resources from Rick and Liz Weber.

A number of climbing guidebooks have been published for the Red River Gorge. First was Red River Gorge Climber's Guide by Frank T Becker in 1975. The explosion of climbing activity since that seminal work led to a succession of other guidebooks, including Rawk! A Climber's Guide to the Red River Gorge by Ed Benjamin and Ed Pearsall, published in 1978, Red River Gorge Climbs by John H. Bronaugh, published in 1993, and Selected Climbs at Red River Gorge Kentucky by Porter Jarrard and Chris Snyder, published in 1997. More recent published guidebooks include Ray Ellington's Red River Gorge Rock Climbs, published in 2005 with a second edition in 2007. The continued establishment of new routes required the latest edition to the guidebook to become two volumes, Red River Gorge Climbs South and Red River Gorge Climbs North. Ray Ellington's newest book, Miller Fork Climbing, explores hundreds of routes in the ever-growing Miller Fork Recreational Preserve.

Miguel's Pizza, a restaurant in Slade, Kentucky, is widely regarded as the hub of climbing culture in the Red River Gorge. Most climbing guidebooks and websites use Miguel's as the starting point for directions to climbing areas ("from Miguel's, turn...").

=== Hiking and camping ===
The Red River Gorge is also known for its hiking trails that range in difficulty from beginner to advanced. Over 60 mi (97 km) of trails, open only to hiking, are maintained by the Forest Service and are located throughout the park (some trails are designated for horses).

There are many campgrounds in the area. Primitive camping, also known as backpack camping, is permitted in the gorge if the camper(s) obtains an overnight permit. Camping is not permitted within 300 ft (91 m) of any road or designated trail. No camping in rock shelters or within 100 ft (30 m) of the base of any cliff.

One of the most popular destinations is Gray's Arch, one of the many natural arches in the park. Gray's Arch is accessible via the Gray's Arch Loop hiking trail (4 mi (6.4 km)), hikers can scramble up the back side of the arch, although this activity is considered extremely dangerous and can lead to injury or death.

== Gladie Visitor Center ==
The Daniel Boone National Forest Gladie Visitor Center is located in the Red River Gorge in Slade, Kentucky. The center features interpretive exhibits about the area's geology, natural history and cultural history. Visitors can get maps, information about trails, camping and other activities.

== Gallery ==
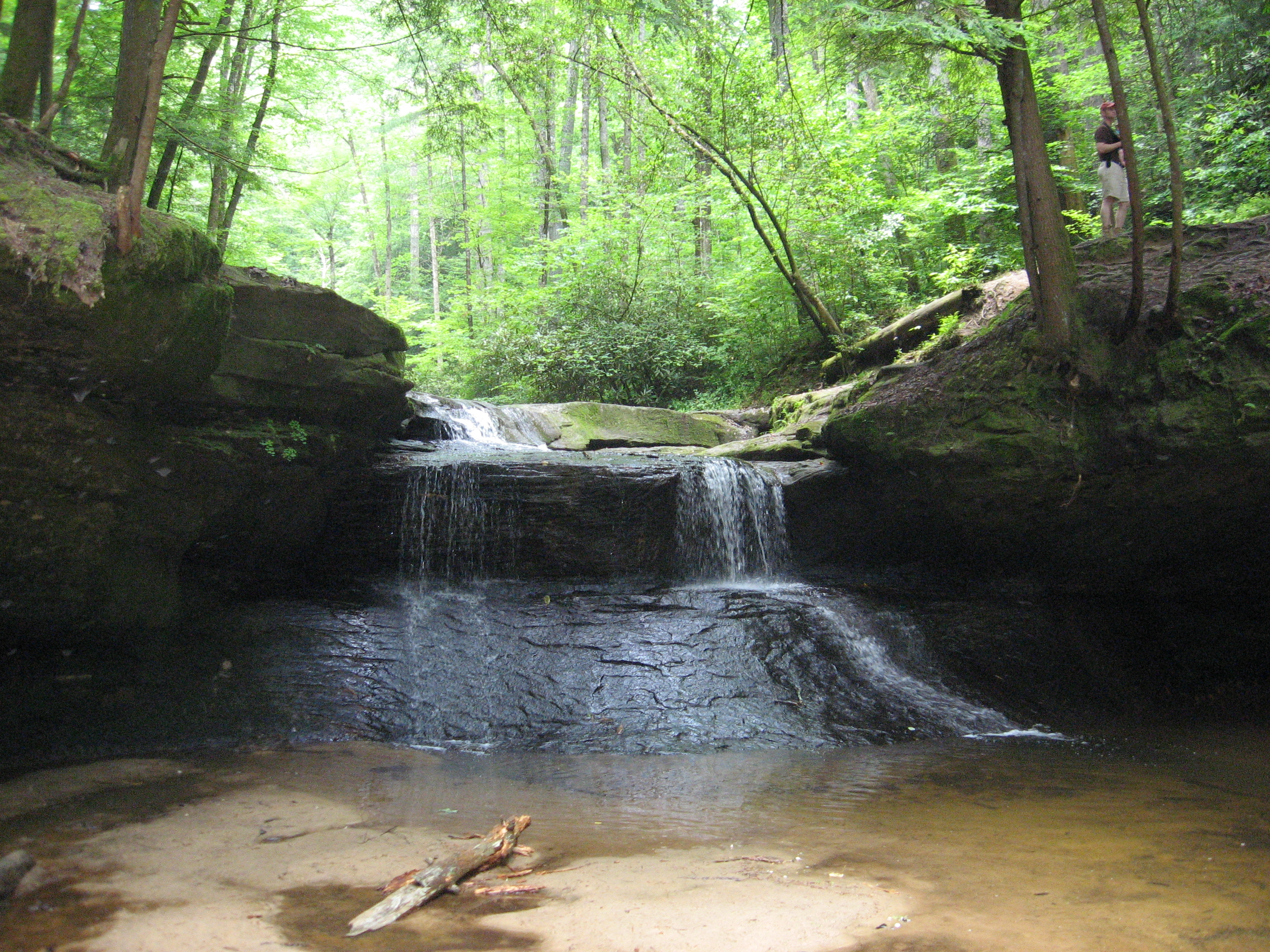
Creation Falls

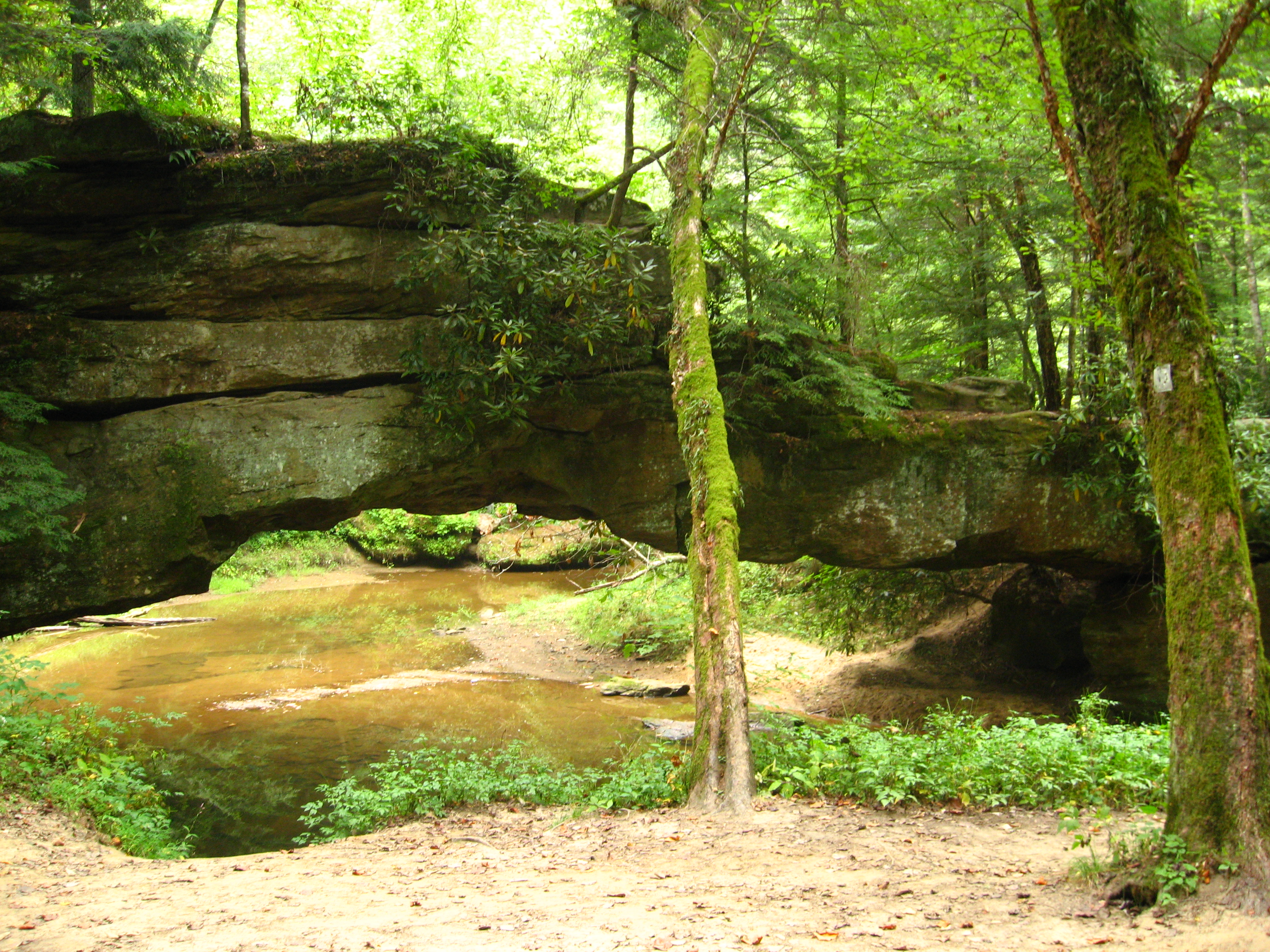
Rock Bridge

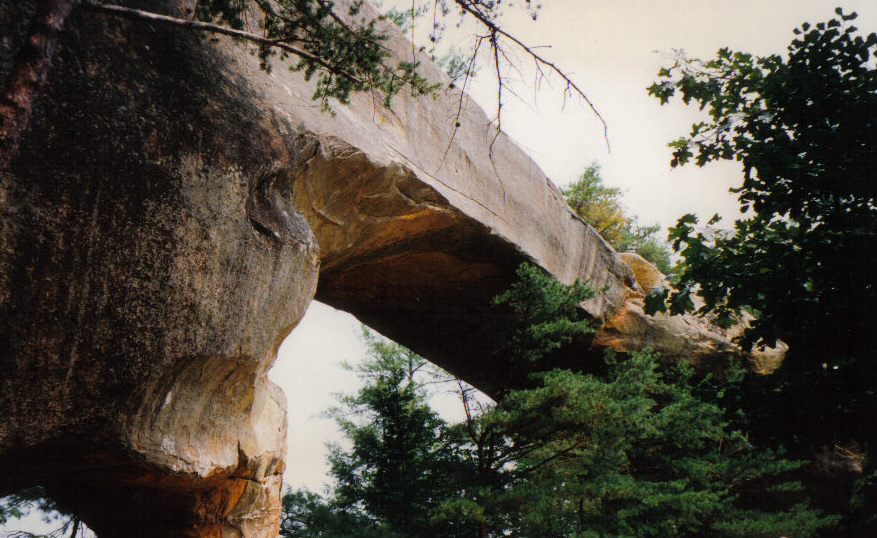
Sky Bridge

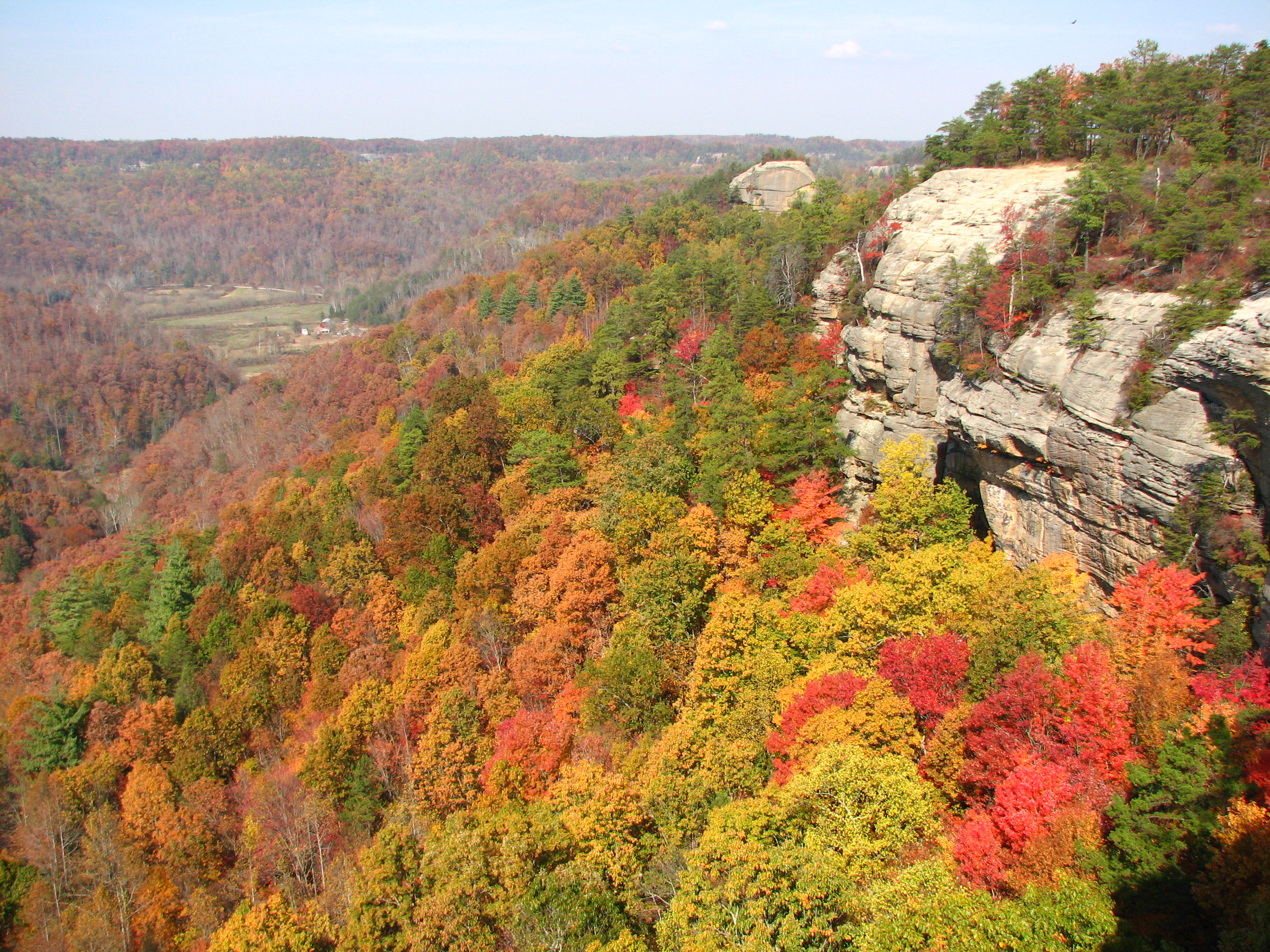
Courthouse Rock

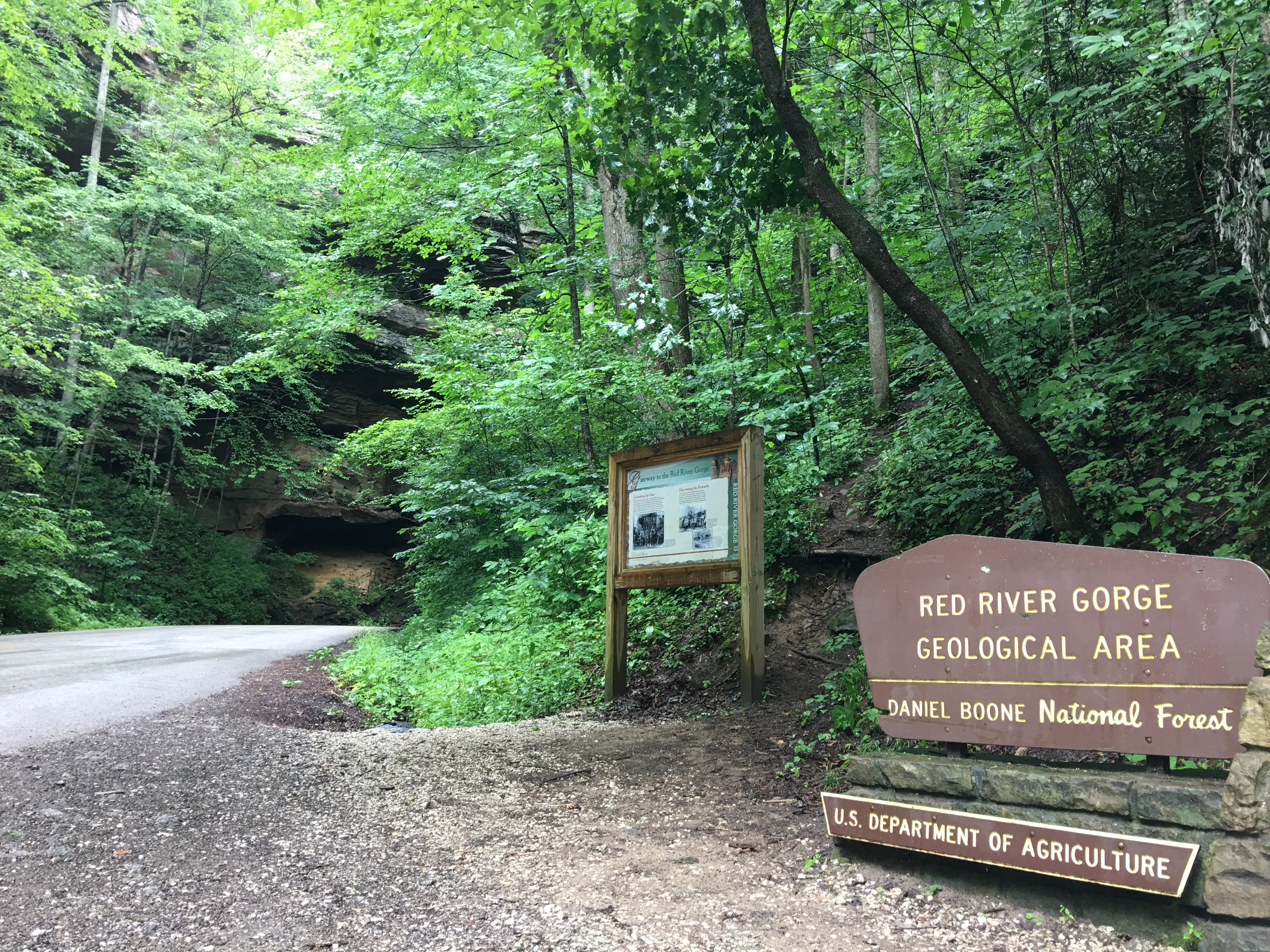
By the east entrance of the Nada Tunnel

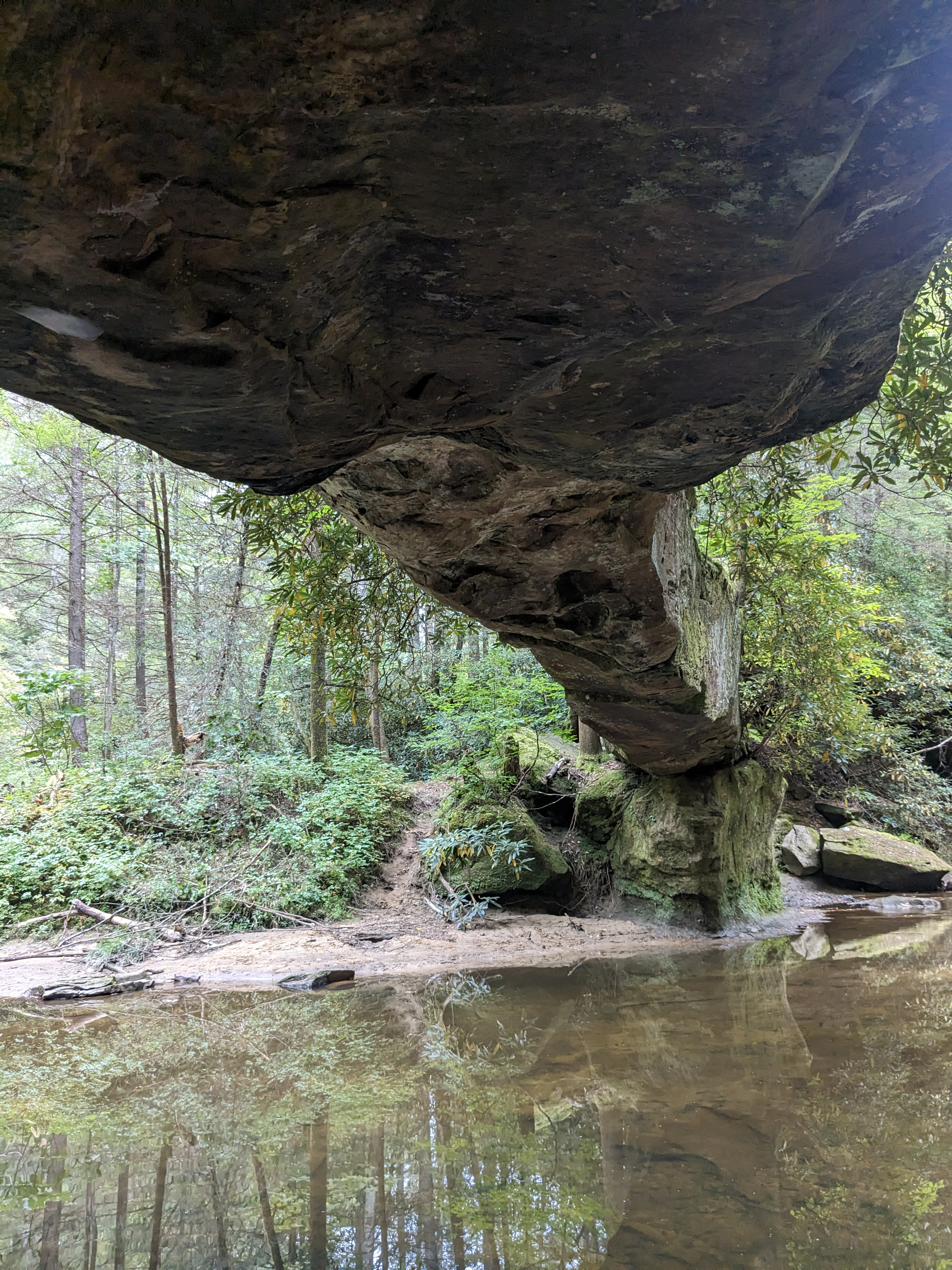
Underside of the Rock Bridge Natural Arch.

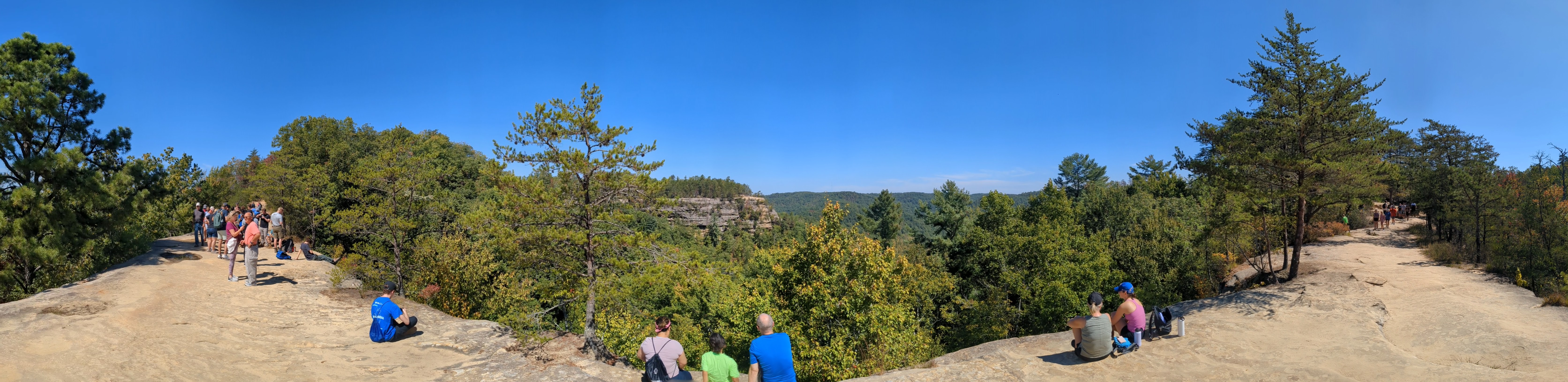
Panoramic view of the top of the Natural Bridge arch.

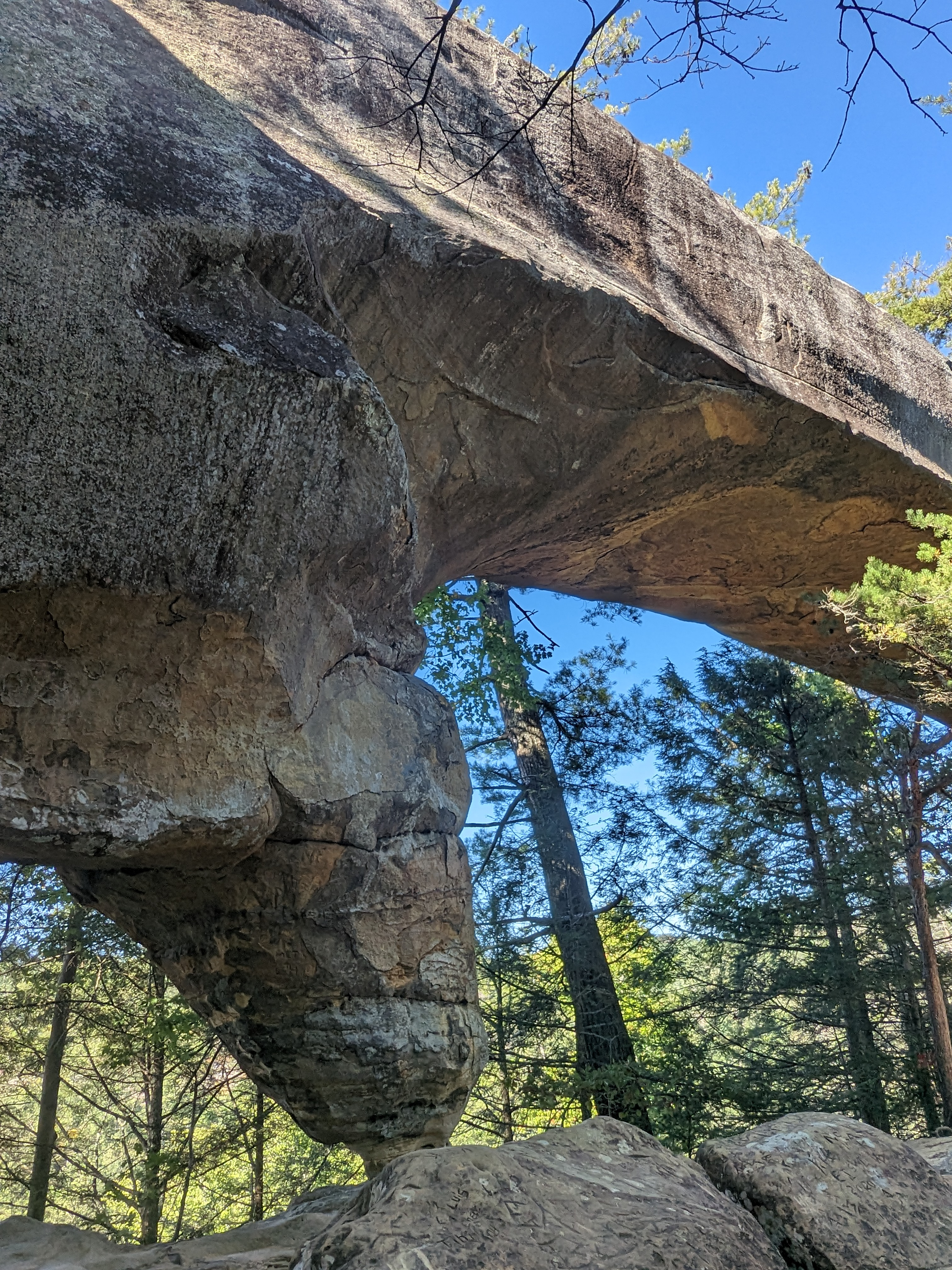
Underside of the Sky Bridge natural arch.
