= Sextons Creek, Kentucky =

Sexton's Creek

Physical characteristics
- Source: forks at the headwaters of Bray Fork
  - coordinates: 37°14′00″N 83°52′06″W
- 2nd source: headwaters of Right Fork Gum Fork
  - coordinates: 37°18′17″N 83°54′23″W
- 3rd source: forks at the headwaters of Little Sexton's Creek
  - coordinates: 37°18′40″N 83°51′30″W
- Mouth: South Fork Kentucky River
  - location: 10 miles (16 km) upstream of Booneville
  - coordinates: 37°21′33″N 83°40′56″W
  - elevation: 648 feet (198 m)
- Length: 24 mi (39 km)

Sexton's Creek is a creek in Clay County, Kentucky that is a tributary of the South Fork Kentucky River in neighbouring Owsley County, Kentucky. It is 24 miles (39 km) long.

It was named for a Sexton family of settlers who arrived some time before 1815.

== Basin, geology, and hydrology ==
The main Sexton's Creek itself lies in a syncline running from south-west to north-east. South-east of the left hand tributaries of Sexton's Creek is the crest of an anticline that roughly parallels Pine Mountain further to the south-east. Those tributaries dip generally to the north-west, with the right hand tributaries dipping down from a less-well-defined anticline crest that runs from south-east to north-west.

== Tributaries and other locations ==
The creek mouth is on South Fork Kentucky River 1.875 miles (3.018 km) downstream of Road Run Branch at altitude 648 feet (198 m) above sea level. Its headwaters (of Gum Fork) are 2.7 miles (4.3 km) into Jackson County, Kentucky, and its mouth is 2 miles (3.2 km) over the county line into Owsley County, the river itself spending 3.5 miles (5.6 km) in Owsley.The entire area is included in the Corbin KY Micropolitan area.

- Its major tributaries are:
  - Bunion Branch 2.25 miles (3.62 km) upstream at altitude 667 feet (203 m), mouth at 37°21′12″N 83°41′34″W headwaters at 37°21′40″N 83°42′46″W
  - Anglin Branch 3 miles (4.8 km) upstream at altitude 779 feet (237 m), mouth at 37°20′51″N 83°42′13″W headwaters at 37°21′03″N 83°45′18″W
  - Booger Branch 3.5 miles (5.6 km) upstream at altitude 687 feet (209 m), mouth at 37°20′20″N 83°43′04″W headwaters at 37°20′50″N 83°44′26″W
  - Spivey Branch 1.5 miles (2.4 km) upstream at altitude 703 feet (214 m), mouth at 37°19′39″N 83°43′42″W headwaters at 37°20′40″N 83°45′43″W
  - Sadler Branch 1.8 miles (2.9 km) upstream at altitude 703 feet (214 m), mouth at 37°19′25″N 83°43′46″W headwaters at 37°18′44″N 83°42′31″W
  - Cool Spring Branch 2 miles (3.2 km) upstream at altitude 717.5 feet (218.7 m), mouth at 37°19′01″N 83°43′46″W Upper and Lower Forks meet at 37°18′55″N 83°43′44″W
    - Upper Fork 1.7 miles (2.7 km) long, headwaters at 37°17′34″N 83°44′16″W
    - Lower Fork, headwaters at 37°18′08″N 83°43′22″W
  - Little Sexton Branch 7.75 miles (12.47 km) upstream at altitude 726 feet (221 m), mouth at 37°19′03″N 83°45′24″W
    - an unnamed right branch 2.5 miles (4.0 km) upstream
      - several forks 0.75 miles (1.21 km) upstream
    - Buncomb Branch 3 miles (4.8 km) upstream at altitude 787 feet (240 m), mouth at 37°19′21″N 83°47′54″W headwaters at 37°21′37″N 83°48′17″W
    - Leger Creek, mouth at 37°19′11″N 83°48′28″W headwaters at 37°20′03″N 83°51′05″W
    - Falling Timber Branch, mouth at 37°18′56″N 83°50′27″W headwaters at 37°18′13″N 83°50′48″W
    - two headwaters forks with their headwaters at 37°18′16″N 83°51′58″W and 37°19′23″N 83°52′21″W
  - Crooked Branch 8.25 miles (13.28 km) upstream at altitude 743 feet (226 m), mouth at 37°18′35″N 83°45′28″W headwaters at 37°18′13″N 83°47′08″W
  - Cradlebow Branch 8.35 miles (13.44 km) upstream at altitude 745 feet (227 m), mouth at 37°18′05″N 83°45′40″W headwaters at 37°16′51″N 83°44′16″W
  - Ells Branch 9.75 miles (15.69 km) upstream at altitude 750 feet (230 m), mouth at 37°17′45″N 83°46′02″W headwaters at 37°16′08″N 83°45′37″W
  - Cave Branch 10.25 miles (16.50 km) upstream at altitude 756 feet (230 m), mouth at 37°17′29″N 83°46′32″W headwaters at 37°15′54″N 83°46′17″W
  - Jim's Branch 10.75 miles (17.30 km) upstream at altitude 762 feet (232 m), mouth at 37°17′36″N 83°46′57″W headwaters at 37°16′23″N 83°47′35″W
  - Chestnut Branch (no connection to chestnut trees and a misspelling of the original Chesnut Branch) 11.625 miles (18.709 km) upstream at altitude 774 feet (236 m), 1.25 miles (2.01 km) long, mouth at 37°17′26″N 83°47′45″W headwaters at 37°17′37″N 83°49′36″W
    - a minor right branch 1.25 miles (2.01 km) upstream
      - a minor left hollow 0.75 miles (1.21 km) upstream
  - Sacker Branch 12.625 miles (20.318 km) upstream at altitude 785 feet (239 m), mouth at 37°16′43″N 83°48′09″W
    - left and right forks (Note: On some maps these are labelled as Sacker Creek and Sacker Branch.) headwaters at 37°15′40″N 83°47′08″W and 37°14′55″N 83°47′14″W
  - Gum Fork 14 miles (23 km) upstream at altitude 804 feet (245 m)
    - a minor right branch of Gum 0.25 miles (0.40 km) upstream
    - Right Fork at altitude 823 feet (251 m), mouth at 37°16′37″N 83°50′34″W
      - Huckleberry Branch 1 mile (1.6 km) upstream, mouth at 37°16′49″N 83°51′23″W headwaters at 37°16′59″N 83°53′00″W
    - Robinson's Creek the Left Fork of Gum, 0.5 miles (0.80 km) upstream,
      - a minor left branch 0.5 miles (0.80 km) upstream
        - a minor left branch 0.25 miles (0.40 km) upstream
      - Pine Lick Fork mouth at 37°15′43″N 83°52′15″W forking at 37°15′09″N 83°52′53″W to headwaters at 37°15′15″N 83°53′26″W and 37°15′03″N 83°53′40″W on the side of High Knob mountain
      - twin forks 2.4 miles (3.9 km) upstream at its headwaters at 37°16′19″N 83°53′36″W
  - Bray Fork 14 miles (23 km) upstream at altitude 804 feet (245 m)
    - Sandlin Branch 0.875 miles (1.408 km) upstream
    - Burning Springs Branch 1.5 miles (2.4 km) upstream at altitude 821 feet (250 m), mouth at 37°16′10″N 83°49′21″W headwaters at 37°13′34″N 83°50′26″W
      - Brushy Fork 2/3 mile (1.1 km) upstream at altitude 865 feet (264 m), mouth at 37°15′42″N 83°49′04″W headwaters at 37°14′55″N 83°48′22″W
      - Post Office Branch
    - Muncy Fork, mouth at 37°14′29″N 83°51′25″W headwaters forks at 37°14′38″N 83°52′08″W
    - Right Fork 2 miles (3.2 km) upstream at altitude 935 feet (285 m), with headwaters at 37°13′22″N 83°52′44″W
    - Left Fork 2 miles (3.2 km) upstream at altitude 935 feet (285 m), headwaters at 37°14′23″N 83°53′03″W

The two forks at the head end of Sexton's Creek into which it splits (37°16′28″N 83°49′12″W) are Bray Fork on the left and Gum Fork on the right in the KGS Fourth Survey report, with Gum forking left and right at the Malcom post office, and Right Fork Gum Fork being joined by Huckleberry Branch and going to the High Knob post office. Bray Fork was at one point considered Sexton's Creek proper, and similarly the Gum Fork is sometimes nowadays considered Sexton's Creek proper. (Note: Because Gum Fork was surveyed as a right branch of Sexton's Creek the relabelling of it as Sexton's on some maps has resulted in a relabelling of a minor right branch of Gum as if it were Gum itself; however this is inconsistent with the KGS Fourth Survey report which has that branch being a mere minor right branch of Gum, between the forks of Gum at Malcom post office and the mouth of Gum.)

=== Taft and Trust post offices in Etta ===
The Trust post office was established on 1905-02-24 by postmaster Maxie York. Located 0.25 miles (0.40 km) upstream on Sexton's Creek it served an area that was named Etta. It closed in April 1906.

The Taft post office was established on 1903-08-20 by postmaster Lucy Couch. Although it ended up by 1953 where Taft had been, it was initially at the mouth of Anglin Branch in Owsley County, moved upstream along Sexton's over the county line 1.5 miles (2.4 km) into Clay some time in or after 1908, and then moved 3 miles (4.8 km) back downstream in 1913 to a site 1 mile (1.6 km) upstream of the mouth of Sexton's. It closed, at the old location of Trust, in 1969.

Although the presumption is that Taft was named after William Howard Taft, who was only Governor of the Philippines at the time, because there were no Owsley or Clay county families by that name; the origins of the names Taft, Trust, and Etta are unknown.

=== Sexton's Creek post office in Clarkes ===
The eponymous postoffice was originally named Section Creek in error when established by postmaster Henry Clark on 1828-05-24. This was rectified on 1843-03-15. The community that it served from the Civil War era onwards was named Clarkes, and was on the main creek just downstream of the mouth of Little Sexton's Creek.

The post office moved around to several locations over the years, serving a mainly rural area with stores and mills, including onto Little Sexton's in 1899. The post office is still on Little Sexton's at the junction of Kentucky Routes 577 and 1350 (37°18′54″N 83°47′03″W) and remains open to this day.

=== Sourwood post office on Leger and Bumcomb, and Ethal/Ethel on Little Sexton's ===
The Ethal post office was established on 1890-08-22 by postmaster William St John. He had originally wanted the names Smith (after a local family), Poe, and Reese, but these were all rejected and the post office ended up named after his eldest daughter. It served a rural community also named Ethal, located in Clay County on Little Sexton's Creek 2.5 miles (4.0 km) upstream of the then location of the Sexton's Creek post office. It closed in November 1893.

Postmaster Ulysses S. G. Rice reestablished it on 1894-03-08, but this time in Jackson County, on the Buncomb Creek fork of Little Sexton's Creek. It moved back to Little Sexton's Creek and Clay County in June 1925 under postmaster Isaac Pennington, who located it at the mouth of Leger Fork. It closed again in December 1933.

After the need increased for postal service in the 1930s, it was reestablished a second time on 1941-05-15 by postmaster Willie Bond. He tried several names, including Ethel, and they were all rejected until he tried Sourwood, after the fiddle and dance tune "Sourwood Mountain". It was first located at Bond's store on Leger Creek, moved back to Buncomb Creek on 1944-10-22 under postmaster Isham Hensley, moved several more times between Bumcomb and Leger, and eventually ended up 3.5 miles (5.6 km) upstream on Bumcomb when it closed in June 1957.

=== Vine post office and Ivy on Little Sexton's ===
The Vine post office was established on 1902-07-01 by postmaster Elihu E. Estridge. It served a rural area named Ivy and was located in various places around the mouth of Falling Timber Branch on Little Sexton's over the years, ending up 0.25 miles (0.40 km) upstream on Falling Timber. It closed in June 1957.

=== Potters Choice and Choice ===
The first Potters Choice post office was established on 1876-09-13 by postmasters Andrew J. Sams and Millard W. Ramsey. It was at the head of Bray Creek, at several different points over its lifetime. The name comes from a local Potter family who owned a lot of land in Jackson and Clay Counties before the Civil War, although the exact meaning of "Choice" is unknown, with hypotheses ranging from the Potters choosing the location to it simply being a "choice" place to live. It closed in August 1878.

The second Potters Choice post office was established on 1882-02-09 by postmaster Jesse Lewis as simply Choice, he having dropped "Potters" from the name some time after his first application in 1881. It was located, according to the application form, 5.5 miles (8.9 km) southwest of the then location of the Laurel Creek post office on Falls Branch and 9 miles (14 km) west of Manchester. It served a village that had several stores and other businesses, two mills, and a population of roughly 600 people. It closed in September 1886, re-opened under Lewis again for the period 1890-04-29 to 1890-09-29, was re-established in a different location 4 miles (6.4 km) south-west of the Burning Springs post office by postmaster Cathern Cress, and finally closed in June 1904.

=== High Knob post office and Stringtown ===
The High Knob post office was established on 1876-10-24 by postmaster Jesse H. McWhorter. Originally it served an area of some 200 people with several businesses including a wagon factory, a store, and some mills; and was located in Clay County just west of a 1,360 feet (410 m) peak (37°16′44″N 83°52′59″W) at the headwaters of Huckleberry Branch, a literally high knob. (Note: Not to be confused with the High Knob mountain to the south at 37°14′56″N 83°53′51″W.) Postmaster Margaret McGeorge moved it over the county line to Gum Fork/Sexton Creek in 1897, just 1 mile (1.6 km) north-west of its prior location, where it served a village named Stringtown, and closed in 1939.

=== Gum Fork and Malcom post office ===
The Malcom post office was established on 1891-01-15 by postmaster James H. Clark. It was located at several places on Gum Fork over its lifetime between the confluence of Bray Fork with Gum and the mouth of Robinson's Creek (the left fork of Gum). In 1918 it was on the mouth of the left branch. It closed in January 1934.

In 1918, J. M. Wilson had a mine 0.175 miles (0.282 km) upstream on the left fork (Robinson's Creek) of Gum; and A. B. Read had two, one at the forks of a left branch of a left branch of the left fork of Gum, and another close by.

=== Cool Spring Branch and Alger post office ===
The Alger post office was established on 1900-08-10 by postmaster Lucy J. Hoskins. She had originally wanted the name Cool Spring, which was rejected. It moved up and down Upper Fork Cool Spring several times, eventually ending up just upstream of the confluence of Upper and Lower Forks, where it closed in August 1964.

In 1918, W. C. Campbell had a mine 1.5 miles (2.4 km) upstream on the Upper Fork of Cool Spring, and J. C. Clark was the local landowner at the site of another mine. Other mines included R. A. Wood's 2/3 mile (1.1 km) upstream on Cool Spring and John Clay's into the same coal seam from Sexton's Creek 1/3 mile (0.54 km) upstream of the mouth of Cool Spring Branch.

=== Burning Springs and Napier post office ===
Burning Springs is a village located on the eponymous Burning Springs Branch, both located in the Corbin Kentucky Micropolitan statistical area. Which take their names from the ground vents of flammable natural gas that used to be in the area. The springs themselves no longer burn, as in the 20th century they were capped by the People's Gas Company and the gas was then piped to other places in the area rather than escaping to the open air. The People's Gas Company, a subsidiary of Wiser Oil, was purchased by the Delta Natural Gas Company in 1981. Tengasco bought the leases to the Burning Springs gas wells in 1995, which ran for a period thereafter, but decided to shut them down.

The village comprises several stores, churches, and a school and is today located at the mouth of Burning Springs Branch. In 1918, the then town of Burning Springs was located upstream at Post Office Branch, a left fork that is now considered to be Burning Springs Branch proper, Burning Springs Branch originally going to the right. Upstream of the town along Post Office Branch, J. H. Harret (1/3 mile (0.54 km) upstream) and Luther Webb (0.5 miles (0.80 km) upstream) were landowners. 1.75 miles (2.82 km) upstream at the headwaters of Post Office Branch (37°13′22″N 83°50′21″W), a gap leads to the Rader's Creek fork of Little Goose Creek. The Macedonia Baptist Church was near to the post office.

The post office in Burning Springs originally had the name Napier and was established by postmaster John C. Napier on 1884-09-25 elsewhere in the Sexton's Creek basin. When it came under the control of postmaster Lafayette M. Rawlings he moved it to his store that was in Burning Springs on 1888-01-17 and renamed it after the village. It closed in December 1965.

=== Chesnut and Gum ===
The Chesnut Branch has no connection to local chestnut trees, and the letter t was an inadvertent insertion into the name. Rather, it is named for a local Chesnut family in the area, who were descendants of early settlers and brothers Samuel and Benjamin Chesnut, and their sons William, Granville, and Thomas. Samuel and Benjamin were born in the then Nelson County of Kentucky in 1789 and 1793. Samuel married a Rachel Gum from a local Gum family that is intertwined with the Chesnut family.

The Dory post office was established on 1886-08-05 by postmaster Susan Chesnut. Chesnut had originally wanted either Chesnut or Chesnut Hill, but got the name Dory instead. It was located south of the then location of the Sexton's Creek post office, on the west side of Sexton's Creek, and 3.5 miles (5.6 km) from the mouth of Chesnut Branch. The succeeding postmaster, Thomas B. Murphy, moved it 1 mile (1.6 km) south, 11 miles (18 km) north of Manchester, in Autumn 1889 and it moved several more times after that. It closed in February 1912.

The Chesnutberg post office (similarly, since misspelled Chestnutberg) was established on 1904-01-12 by the same Susan Chesnut. This post office was located opposite the mouth of Chesnut Branch. It closed in 1985.

In the meantime, Dory post office had been reestablished on 1930-05-06 by postmaster Albert Craft, and had closed again in November 1933. In 1918, Leander Chesnut had a mine 1/6 mile (0.27 km) upstream on a left hollow that is 0.75 miles (1.21 km) upstream on a right branch that is 1.25 miles (2.01 km) upstream on Chesnut Branch. John Pennington had one near to the headwaters of Chesnut Branch.

=== General ===
The Adela post office was established on 1902-07-05 by postmaster William H. Murray to serve the rural area initially known as Murray. It was named after Murray's daughter. It was located on Bray Creek at the mouth of Muncy Fork and later the area served by the post office was simply named Muncy Fork too. It closed in July 1934.

The Sacker Gap post office was established on 1928-04-28 by postmaster Cornelious S. Sawyer. The name "Sacker" is probably for a local family, otherwise unrecorded, and the "Gap" indicates its location on a gap between Sacker Branch headwaters and the Reed branch of Laurel Creek. It closed in February 1935.

The Joshua post office was established by post master Elijah H. Begley on 1889-06-06. It was located at the mouth of Sexton's Creek on South Fork Kentucky River. Begley had originally wanted the name Goose Rock after a then local landmark. It closed on 1895-07-11.

A road leads over the divide, from the forks of the Left Fork Gum Fork to Bray's Fork.

== See also ==
- List of rivers of Kentucky

== Sources ==
- Russell, Philip G. (1918). The coals of Sexton Creek and the tributaries of South Fork on the right between the mouth of Redbird Creek and the mouth of Sexton Creek. Reports series 4. Vol. 4 part 3. Kentucky Geological Survey. pp. 185–260.
- Rennick, Robert M. (2000). Clay County — Post Offices. County Histories of Kentucky. Vol. 176. Morehead State University.
- Rennick, Robert M. (2000). Jackson County — Post Offices. County Histories of Kentucky. Vol. 219. Morehead State University.
- Rennick, Robert M. (2000). Owsley County — Post Offices. County Histories of Kentucky. Vol. 276. Morehead State University.
- Jillson, Willard Rouse, ed. (1929). "Clay County". The Geology and Mineral Resources of Kentucky. Sixth Report. Vol. 17. Frankfort, Kentucky: Kentucky Geological Survey. LCCN gs29000190. OCLC 5340459. OL 252947M.
- Jillson, Willard Rouse, ed. (1927). New Oil Pools of Kentucky. Sixth Report. Vol. 12. Frankfort, Kentucky: Kentucky Geological Survey. LCCN 27027148. OCLC 3681095. OL 6709328M.
- Wimberly, Mary Ellen (2021-10-21). Responses to Commission Staffs Fifth Request for Information (PDF). Electronic application of Delta Natural Gas Company, Inc. for an Adjustment of Its Rates and a certificate of public convenience and necessity. Delta Natural Gas Company.
- "UNITED STATES SECURITIES AND EXCHANGE COMMISSION: FORM 10-SB: TENGASCO, INC".
- Shockey, Amanda Rudder Taylor (1991). "Chesnut Relatives". Our George Related Families: To Accompany Our George Family Book. Amanda Rudder Taylor Shockey.
- Hoffman, Muriel Martens (1984). Leaves from the Gum Tree. Muriel Martens Hoffman.
