= Pigeon Roost =

Pigeon Roost or Pigeonroost may refer to:

- Horse Creek (Kentucky), location of Pigeon Roost Creek and Pigeonroost post office
- Pigeon Roost, Mississippi, a ghost town in Choctaw County
- Pigeonroost, North Carolina, an unincorporated community in Mitchell County
- Pigeon Roost Creek (Indiana), a stream
- Pigeon Roost Creek (Missouri), a stream
- Pigeon Roost State Historic Site, near Underwood, Indiana

== See also ==
- Upper Pidgeonroost, Kentucky, an unincorporated community in Perry County
