= Beech Creek (Clay County, Kentucky) =

River in Kentucky, United States

Physical characteristics
- Source: Beech Creek headwaters
  - coordinates: 37°08′56″N 83°41′50″W
- 2nd source: Little Beech Creek headwaters
  - coordinates: 37°10′23″N 83°41′34″W
- 3rd source: Bert T. Combs Lake
  - coordinates: 37°10′05″N 83°42′33″W
- Mouth: Goose Creek
  - coordinates: 37°12′46″N 83°42′15″W
  - elevation: 752 feet (229 m)

Beech Creek is a tributary of Goose Creek in Clay County, Kentucky. It is just under 6 miles (9.7 km) long and joins the Goose approximately 1/2 mile (0.80 km) below the mouth of Laurel Creek.

Its headwaters are at Combs Lake in the Beech Creek Wildlife Area.

== Tributaries and post offices ==
The mouth of Beech is 8 miles (13 km) upstream of Oneida, at altitude 752 feet (229 m) above sea level.

- Its major tributaries are:
  - Little Beech Creek 1 mile (1.6 km) upstream, mouth at 37°11′52″N 83°42′36″W
    - forks 1 mile (1.6 km) upstream
  - a branch 4 miles (6.4 km) upstream

The Mount Welcome postoffice was established on 1849-08-29 by postmaster Reuben May, and closed in July 1852.

The Tankersley postoffice was established on 1882-07-31 by husband and wife postmasters James Franklin Tankersley and Drucilla Tankersley. It was not named for themselves but for James' father, John M. Tankersley (born in 1810 and whose surname was spelled Tankisley in the 1870 census). Initially it was opposite the mouth of Beech Creek, moving downstream along Goose by 1.5 miles (2.4 km) to Houchell Bend, and back up to Beech some time before the 1950s. It was back at Beech Creek by the time of its closure in 1977.

The Cedral postoffice was established on 1901-04-10 by postmaster Thomas Jefferson Houchell. Initially 3.5 miles (5.6 km) upstream along Beech, it moved downstream by 1/4 mile (0.40 km), closed in 1905, reopened on 1909-12-09 by postmaster Lucy Hounchell 1/2 mile (0.80 km) upstream, and closed again in November 1913.

In 1918 Jefferson Jones had a mine on a minor branch of Beech 4 miles (6.4 km) upstream, and Thomas Gregory 4.125 miles (6.639 km) upstream on Beech itself.

== Wildlife Area ==
At the headwaters of Beech Creek is a gap that connects to the Hart Branch of Goose Creek. The 232-acre (94 ha) Beech Creak Wildlife area surrounding Bert T. Combs Lake at the headwaters is adjacent to the Daniel Boone National Forest and is accessed by road from Littleton, although there are no roads within the wildlife area itself.

It is 94% forest, 4% open land, and 2% open water. The Bert T. Combs lake was built in 1963 and was originally named the Beech Creek Lake. It covers 60 acres (24 ha) and was built to supply water to the city of Manchester, which is further along the road down Hart Branch past Littleton and along Goose Creek.

== See also ==
- List of rivers of Kentucky

== Sources ==
- Hodge, James Michael (1918). The coals of Goose Creek and its tributaries. Reports of the Kentucky Geological Survey 4th series 1912–1918. Vol. 4. Frankfort, Kentucky: The State Journal Company. (The coals of Goose Creek and its tributaries at the Internet Archive)
- Rennick, Robert M. (2000c). "Clay County — Post Offices". County Histories of Kentucky (176). Morehead State University.
- United States Bureau of Chemistry and Soils (2003). "Clay County, Kentucky". Soil Survey. United States Department of Agriculture.
- "Burchell-Beech Creek Wildlife Management Area" (PDF). Kentucky Department of Fish and Wildlife.
- "Six New Lakes A-Building". Kentucky Happy Hunting Ground. Vol. 23. Kentucky Department of Fish and Wildlife Resources. 1967.
