= Pigeon Roost Creek =

Pigeon Roost Creek may refer to:

- Pigeon Roost Creek (Indiana)
- Pigeon Roost Creek (Missouri)
