= Peabody, Kentucky =

Unincorporated community in Kentucky, United States

- post office
- Location within Kentucky
- Coordinates: 37°08′20″N 83°35′27″W
- Country: United States
- State: Kentucky
- County: Clay
- Elevation: 846 ft (258 m)
- Time zone: UTC-5 (Eastern (EST))
  - Summer (DST): UTC-4 (EDT)
- Area code: 606
- GNIS feature ID: 514465

Peabody was a post office in Clay County, Kentucky, United States that served coal mining and lumber company lands bought by Francis Peabody of Peabody Energy and eventually ended up as part of a national forest. It closed in 1982. The Red Bird Purchase Unit Ranger Station is located at Peabody.

The land was originally bought from local landowners by a combine of businessmen from Manchester, who sold it to Peabody some time around 1907. The post office was first established as Annalee at the mouth of Big Double Creek on the Red Bird River on 1909-06-11, by postmaster and storekeeper Floyd M. Chadwell. He took the name from the daughter of his new neighbour, who was civil engineer Thomas A. Bird brought in to manage the land holdings for Peabody. With new postmaster Jewell L. Galloway on 1930-07-01 it changed name to the Redbird River, gaining its final name of Peabody on 1933-03-01, at which point the land was not owned by Peabody any more.

The land had in the meantime been bought by Fordson Coal Company, with Thomas A. Bird still managing it, and had a large Civilian Conservation Corps camp. It was sold on to Potomac Industries in the 1960s, in turn sold to the Red Bird Timber Company in 1965, and finally sold on 1967-01-01 to the Red Bird Purchase Unit of the United States Government to go on to form part of the Daniel Boone National Forest.

Fordson's purchase of the land in the first quarter of 1923 was in order to secure coal supplies, after a September 1922 incident where the Interstate Commerce Commission had restricted supply of coal to the Ford company because it was not "essential" use. It was part of a bulk purchase of various Peabody holdings throughout Leslie, Clay, Perry, Bell, and Letcher counties, the so-called 12,000 acres (4,900 ha) Peabody Tract, the total price of which was US$2,783,000 and which was estimated to be capable of supplying 20,000,000 short tons (18 Tg) of coal and 500,000,000 feet (150 Mm) of lumber.

Because of conditions imposed by Fordson on its tenants to preserve its coal and lumber interests, the Peabody Tract area in general was without paved roads or telephones until its sale in the 1960s. In exchange for peppercorn rents of US$10, US$5, or even nothing at all per annum, tenants were required to provide what was termed "Care of Property", putting out forest fires and preventing other people from cutting timber. They were also themselves prohibited from cutting trees, or without prior Fordson permission hauling trees (over the tract) that had been cut elsewhere, cutting even small timber for domestic purposes, or building housing structures for livestock (e.g. barns, pens, and chicken coops). The company did not position itself as a landlord, did not perform housing repair, and did not permit (as one letter from company manager Christopher Queen to a tenant confirmed) the construction of "any more houses on our land".

== Sources ==
- Rennick, Robert M. (2000c). "Clay County — Post Offices". County Histories of Kentucky (176). Morehead State University.
- Bryan, Ford Richardson (1997). Beyond the Model T: The Other Ventures of Henry Ford. Wayne State University Press. ISBN 9780814326824.
- Weise, Robert S. (2018). "Remaking Red Bird". In Stock, Catherine McNicol; Johnston, Robert D. (eds.). The Countryside in the Age of the Modern State: Political Histories of Rural America. Cornell University Press. ISBN 9781501717734.
