= Ben Golden McCollum =

American outlaw

Ben McCollum

FBI Ten Most Wanted Fugitive
- Alias: Sheik of Boynton

Description
- Born: Ben Golden McCollum; 1909; Big Creek, Kentucky
- Died: August 12, 1963 (aged 53–54); Marcum, Kentucky
- Nationality: American
- Race: White
- Gender: Male

Status
- Added: January 4, 1957
- Caught: March 7, 1958
- Captured

Ben Golden McCollum (1909 – August 12, 1963) was an outlaw in Oklahoma during the 1920s who was nicknamed the "Sheik of Boynton". McCollum robbed banks in both Prague, Oklahoma (where he got away with US$3400) and Checotah, Oklahoma ($4700) in 1929. He was captured on the streets of Boynton, Oklahoma shortly after the Checotah heist.

== Background ==
McCollum was convicted of both bank robberies and sentenced to a forty-year term at the Oklahoma State Penitentiary in McAlester, Oklahoma. On April 15, 1934, McCollum knifed two fellow inmates to death in a dispute over a card game. He was originally sentenced to death for the murders, but the sentence was later reduced to a life term. McCollum escaped prison in 1954 and was added to the FBI Ten Most Wanted Fugitives list on January 4, 1957. He was captured on March 7, 1958 in a rooming house in Indianapolis, Indiana and returned to McAlester. McCollum was paroled in 1961, at which time he relocated to Marcum, Kentucky.

McCollum was shot-gunned to death at his home by a pair of youthful burglars on the night of August 12, 1963, whose identities are unknown.

== See also ==
- List of unsolved murders (1900–1979)

== Books ==
- Morgan, R. D. Taming the Sooner State: The War Between Lawmen and Outlaws in Oklahoma.
- Sabljack, Mark; Martin Greenberg. Most Wanted: A History of the FBI's Ten Most Wanted List.
- Daily Oklahoman and Muskogee Phoenix...Numerous articles from 1929—1934---1954-1958-
- Personal Interview with nephew of Ben Golden "Goldie" McCollum in Fall 2007
