= Clay County, Kentucky =

County in Kentucky, United States

- County
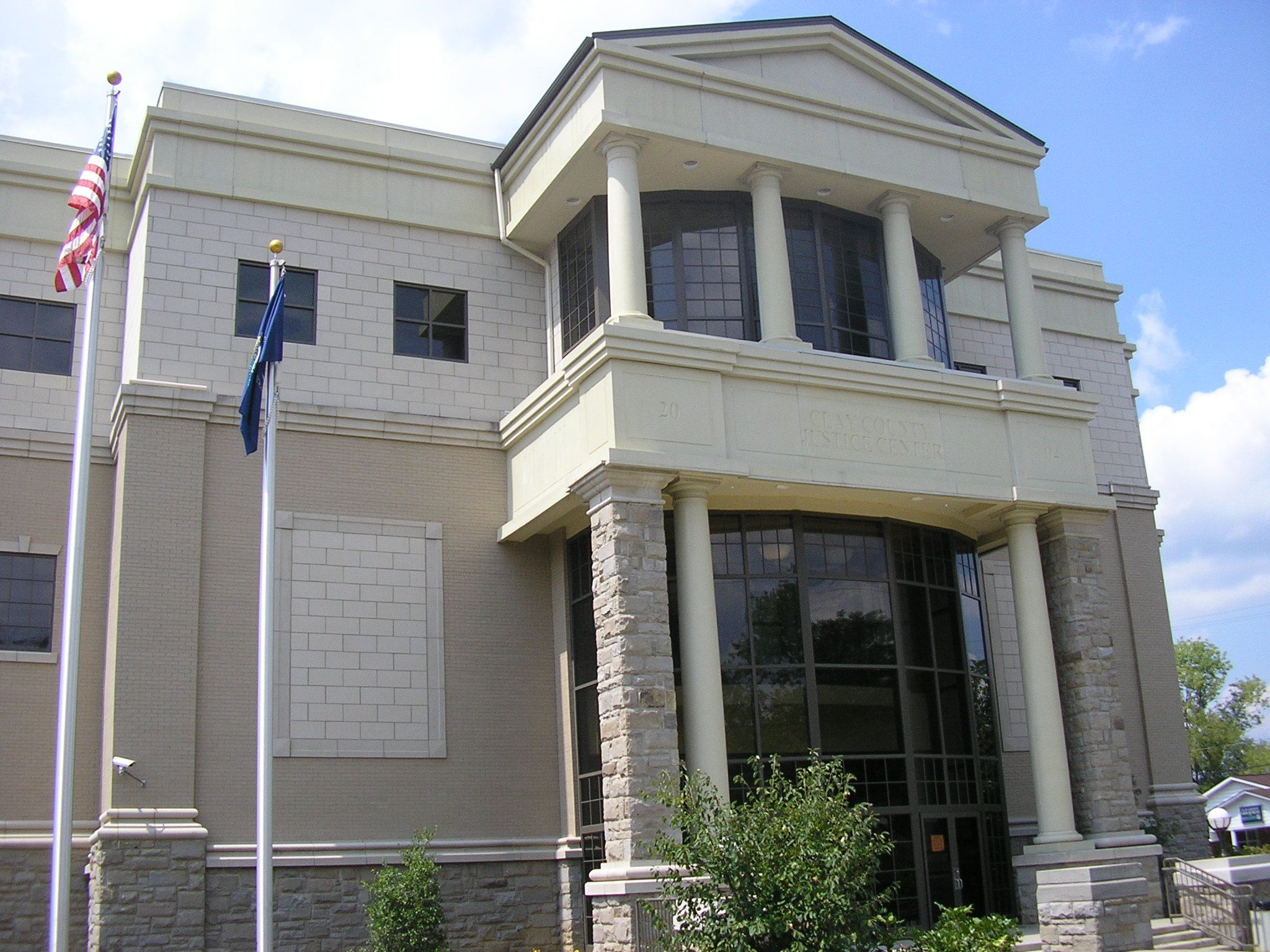
- Clay County courthouse in Manchester

- Location within the U.S. state of Kentucky
- Coordinates: 37°10′N 83°43′W
- Country: United States
- State: Kentucky
- Founded: 1807
- Named for: Green Clay
- Seat: Manchester
- Largest city: Manchester

Government
  - Judge/Executive: Tommy Harmon (R)

Area
  - Total: 471 sq mi (1,220 km^{2})
  - Land: 469 sq mi (1,210 km^{2})
  - Water: 1.8 sq mi (4.7 km^{2}) 0.4%

Population (2020)
  - Total: 20,345
  - Estimate (2025): 19,465 ▼
  - Density: 43.4/sq mi (16.7/km^{2})
- Time zone: UTC−5 (Eastern)
  - Summer (DST): UTC−4 (EDT)
- Congressional district: 5th
- Website: claycounty.ky.gov

Clay County is a county located in the U.S. state of Kentucky. As of the 2020 census, the county population was 20,345. Clay County is included in the Corbin, Kentucky micropolitan area. Its county seat is Manchester. The county was formed in 1807 and named in honor of Green Clay (1757–1826). Clay was a member of the Virginia and Kentucky State legislatures, first cousin once removed of Henry Clay, U.S. Senator from Kentucky and Secretary of State in the 19th century.

== History ==
Clay County was established in 1807 from land given by Floyd, Knox and Madison counties. The courthouse burned in January 1936.

== Geography ==
According to the United States Census Bureau, the county has a total area of 471 square miles (1,220 km^{2}), of which 469 square miles (1,210 km^{2}) is land and 1.8 square miles (4.7 km^{2}) (0.4%) is water.

=== Adjacent counties ===
- Owsley County (north)
- Perry County (northeast)
- Leslie County (east)
- Bell County (southeast)
- Knox County (southwest)
- Laurel County (west)
- Jackson County (northwest)

=== Watercourses ===
- Sexton Creek
- Bullskin Creek
- South Fork of Kentucky River
  - Red Bird River
    - Big Creek
    - Bear Creek
  - Goose Creek
    - Horse Creek
    - Laurel Creek
    - Little Goose Creek
    - Wildcat Creek
    - Collins Creek
- South Fork of Rockcastle River

== Demographics ==
Historical population
Census	Pop.	Note	%±
1810	2,398		—
1820	4,393		83.2%
1830	3,548		−19.2%
1840	4,607		29.8%
1850	5,421		17.7%
1860	6,652		22.7%
1870	8,297		24.7%
1880	10,222		23.2%
1890	12,447		21.8%
1900	15,364		23.4%
1910	17,789		15.8%
1920	19,795		11.3%
1930	18,526		−6.4%
1940	23,901		29.0%
1950	23,116		−3.3%
1960	20,748		−10.2%
1970	18,481		−10.9%
1980	22,752		23.1%
1990	21,746		−4.4%
2000	24,556		12.9%
2010	21,730		−11.5%
2020	20,345		−6.4%
2025 (est.)	19,465	▼	−4.3%
U.S. Decennial Census; 1790–1960 1900–1990

=== 2020 census ===
As of the 2020 census, the county had a population of 20,345. The median age was 40.8 years. 21.4% of residents were under the age of 18 and 16.4% of residents were 65 years of age or older. For every 100 females there were 108.1 males, and for every 100 females age 18 and over there were 109.4 males age 18 and over.

The racial makeup of the county was 92.9% White, 4.1% Black or African American, 0.2% American Indian and Alaska Native, 0.1% Asian, 0.1% Native Hawaiian and Pacific Islander, 0.3% from some other race, and 2.4% from two or more races. Hispanic or Latino residents of any race comprised 1.7% of the population.

0.0% of residents lived in urban areas, while 100.0% lived in rural areas.

There were 7,593 households in the county, of which 31.5% had children under the age of 18 living with them and 29.9% had a female householder with no spouse or partner present. About 28.6% of all households were made up of individuals and 12.7% had someone living alone who was 65 years of age or older.

There were 8,581 housing units, of which 11.5% were vacant. Among occupied housing units, 70.9% were owner-occupied and 29.1% were renter-occupied. The homeowner vacancy rate was 1.2% and the rental vacancy rate was 5.9%.

=== 2010 census ===
As of the census of 2010, there were 21,730 people, 8,556 households, and 6,442 families residing in the county. The population density was 52 people per square mile (20 people/km^{2}). There were 9,439 housing units at an average density of 20 per square mile (7.7/km^{2}). The racial makeup of the county was 93.9% White, 4.8% Black or African American, 0.2% Native American, 0.1% Asian, <0.1% Pacific Islander, 0.2% from other races, and 0.7% from two or more races. 1.4% of the population were Hispanics or Latinos of any race.

Of the 8,556 households, 36.9% had children under the age of 18 living with them, 58.6% were married couples living together, 12.4% had a female householder with no husband present, and 24.7% were non-families. 22.5% of all households were made up of individuals, and 9.0% had someone living alone who was 65 years of age or older. The average household size was 2.62 and the average family size was 3.06.

The age distribution was 25.4% under the age of 18, 9.2% from 18 to 24, 32.6% from 25 to 44, 22.5% from 45 to 64, and 10.3% who were 65 years of age or older. The median age was 35 years. For every 100 females, there were 111.7 males. For every 100 females age 18 and over, there were 112.6 males.

The median income for a household in the county was $16,271, and the median income for a family was $18,925. Males had a median income of $24,164 versus $17,816 for females. The per capita income for the county was $9,716. About 35.4% of families and 39.7% of the population were below the poverty line, including 47.6% of those under the age of 18 and 31.3% of those age 65 or over.

The county's per-capita income and median household income make it one of the poorest counties in the United States. Among counties whose population contains a non-Hispanic white majority, Clay County was once the poorest by per-capita income and second to another county in the same Kentucky region, Owsley County, by median household income. However, in recent years the economic status of Clay County, Kentucky has improved relative to other lower income counties.

== Communities ==
=== City ===
- Manchester (county seat)

=== Census-designated places ===
- Oneida

=== Unincorporated towns and villages ===
- Big Creek
- Fall Rock
- Garrard
- Goose Rock
- Hubbardsville
- Littleton
- Sibert

=== Post offices ===
Many former post offices were, and some current ones are, located along the waterways, which are paralleled by modern roads. Arrows denote renamings.

- Alger
- Bernice
- Barcreek
- Barger
- Bessie → Mill Pond
- Big Creek
- Bluehole
- Botto
- Brightshade
- Brutus
- Bullskin
- Bullskin Creek
- Burning Springs
- Caution
- Cedral
- Chesnut Hill → Chesnut
- Chesnutburg
- Potters Choice → Choice
- Cottongim
- Disappoint
- Eriline
- Eros
- Ethal → Ethel
- Fall Rock
- Garrard
- Goose Rock
- Grace
- Hacker → Hensley
- Hollingsworth
- Hooker
- Crawfish → Hima
- Laurel Creek
- Lincoln
- Lipps
- Lockards
- Malcom
- Marcum
- Martins Creek
- Mount Welcome
- Adela → Murray → Muncie Fork
- Ogle
- Annalee → Redbird River → Peabody
- Panco
- Pancone
- Pigeonroost
- Plank
- Rockgap
- Seth
- Sibert
- Sory
- Spurlock
- Tanksley
- Tinker
- Treadway
- Wildcat
- Sacker Gap
- Seeley
- Sextons Creek
- Smallwood
- Sourwood
- Urban
- Vine
- Wages

=== Other places ===
- Benge
- Brooks
- Buzzard
- Datha
- Fogertown
- Greenbriar
- Hector
- Hubbardsville
- Larue
- Philpot
- Pinhook

There are also places named in early censuses, some still identifiable today: Ammie, Ashers Fork, Creekville, Deer Lick, Felty, Gardner, Jacks Creek, McWhorter, Portersburg, Queendale, Shepherdtown, Sidell, Spring Creek, Teges, and Trixie.

== Politics ==
United States presidential election results for Clay County, Kentucky
Year	Republican		Democratic		Third party(ies)	
Year	No.	%	No.	%	No.	%
1912	1,034	45.89%	625	27.74%	594	26.36%
1916	2,271	73.21%	820	26.43%	11	0.35%
1920	4,015	80.17%	960	19.17%	33	0.66%
1924	3,613	74.08%	1,144	23.46%	120	2.46%
1928	4,439	86.97%	651	12.75%	14	0.27%
1932	3,474	61.81%	2,133	37.95%	13	0.23%
1936	4,087	72.22%	1,572	27.78%	0	0.00%
1940	4,395	72.92%	1,632	27.08%	0	0.00%
1944	4,307	78.38%	1,185	21.57%	3	0.05%
1948	3,142	66.26%	1,468	30.96%	132	2.78%
1952	4,161	75.05%	1,365	24.62%	18	0.32%
1956	4,897	82.52%	1,027	17.31%	10	0.17%
1960	4,922	78.09%	1,381	21.91%	0	0.00%
1964	3,298	50.41%	3,223	49.26%	22	0.34%
1968	4,663	75.16%	1,213	19.55%	328	5.29%
1972	4,046	69.99%	1,709	29.56%	26	0.45%
1976	3,652	68.44%	1,674	31.37%	10	0.19%
1980	4,594	67.78%	2,121	31.29%	63	0.93%
1984	4,772	74.26%	1,634	25.43%	20	0.31%
1988	4,156	70.63%	1,709	29.04%	19	0.32%
1992	4,747	63.92%	2,012	27.09%	668	8.99%
1996	3,716	58.05%	2,135	33.35%	550	8.59%
2000	4,926	73.31%	1,723	25.64%	70	1.04%
2004	5,726	74.49%	1,901	24.73%	60	0.78%
2008	5,710	77.54%	1,552	21.08%	102	1.39%
2012	6,176	83.65%	1,111	15.05%	96	1.30%
2016	5,861	86.61%	752	11.11%	154	2.28%
2020	6,677	87.96%	831	10.95%	83	1.09%
2024	6,729	89.41%	692	9.19%	105	1.40%

Clay County has been rock-ribbed Republican since the Civil War, having last voted for a Democratic nominee for president in 1860 when it supported Kentucky native and Southern Democrat John C. Breckinridge. In the last one hundred years the only Republicans to receive less than sixty percent were Bob Dole, who still won the county by nearly 25 percent, and Barry Goldwater, who held the county by seventy-five votes amidst a Democratic landslide in 1964. In 2008 John McCain received 77.5% of the vote, and in 2024 three time GOP nominee Donald Trump received nearly 90% of Clay's vote, which was the highest total in the county's history.

=== Elected officials ===
Elected officials as of January 3, 2025
U.S. House	Hal Rogers (R)	KY 5
Ky. Senate	Robert Stivers (R)	25
Ky. House	Derek Lewis (R)	90

== Health ==
In July 2010, The Washington Post named Clay County the unhealthiest county in Kentucky, and one of the unhealthiest in the nation. Clay County also featured prominently in a June 2014 article in The New York Times about the difficulty of living in poverty in eastern Kentucky, ranking last in overall ratings for counties in the United States. The factors which accounted for Clay county's low ranking were unemployment, prevalence of disabilities, obesity, income, and education. The Times declared Clay County the "hardest place to live in the U.S."

=== Life expectancy ===
Of 3,142 counties in the United States in 2014, Clay County ranked 3,137 in the longevity of female residents and 3,109 in the longevity of male residents. Males in Clay County lived an average of 68.6 years and females lived an average of 73.6 years compared to the national average for longevity of 76.5 for males and 81.2 for females. Moreover, the average longevity in Clay County declined by 0.4 years for males and 3.4 years for females between 1985 and 2014 compared to a national average for the same period of an increased life span of 5.5 years for men and 3.1 years for women. High rates of smoking and obesity and a low level of physical activity appear to be contributing factors to the lowered longevity for both sexes.

== Education ==
There is one school district in the county, Clay County School District.

== Notable residents ==
- Jane Fox (1899–1991), dance professor at Indiana University

== See also ==
- National Register of Historic Places listings in Clay County, Kentucky
- Red Bird River Petroglyphs
