= Sibert, Kentucky =

Unincorporated community in Kentucky, United States

Sibert
- town
- Location within the state of Kentucky Sibert (the United States)
- Coordinates: 37°7′23″N 83°47′14″W
- Country: United States
- State: Kentucky
- County: Clay
- Elevation: 876 ft (267 m)
- Time zone: UTC-6 (Central (CST))
  - Summer (DST): UTC-5 (CST)
- GNIS feature ID: 515401

Sibert is a coal town and rail depot, and was a post office, in Clay County, Kentucky, United States located below the mouth of the Paw Paw Branch of the Horse Creek tributary of the Goose Creek river, half a mile above Hima. The town, depot, and postoffice were all named after a local family who were descendants, through William and Milton Siebert, of pioneers Daniel and Sarah (Sallie) Siebert.

In 1918, a Daniel Siebert had a mine on Horse Creek, 2.625 miles (4.225 km) upstream, and Thomas Siebert one 0.25 miles (0.40 km) upstream on Paw Paw branch..

The post office was established by Ellen Lewis on 1920-09-20, James W. McNamara its first postmaster, and closed in 1974.

The elevation of Sibert is 876 feet. Its population in July 2007 is 3,027.

== Sources ==
- Hodge, James Michael (1918). The coals of Goose Creek and its tributaries. Reports of the Kentucky Geological Survey 4th series 1912–1918. Vol. 4. Frankfort, Kentucky: The State Journal Company. (The coals of Goose Creek and its tributaries at the Internet Archive)
- Rennick, Robert M. (2000c). "Clay County — Post Offices". County Histories of Kentucky (176). Morehead State University.
