= Red Bird River Petroglyphs =

- Red Bird River Petroglyphs (15CY51)
- Formerly listed on the U.S. National Register of Historic Places
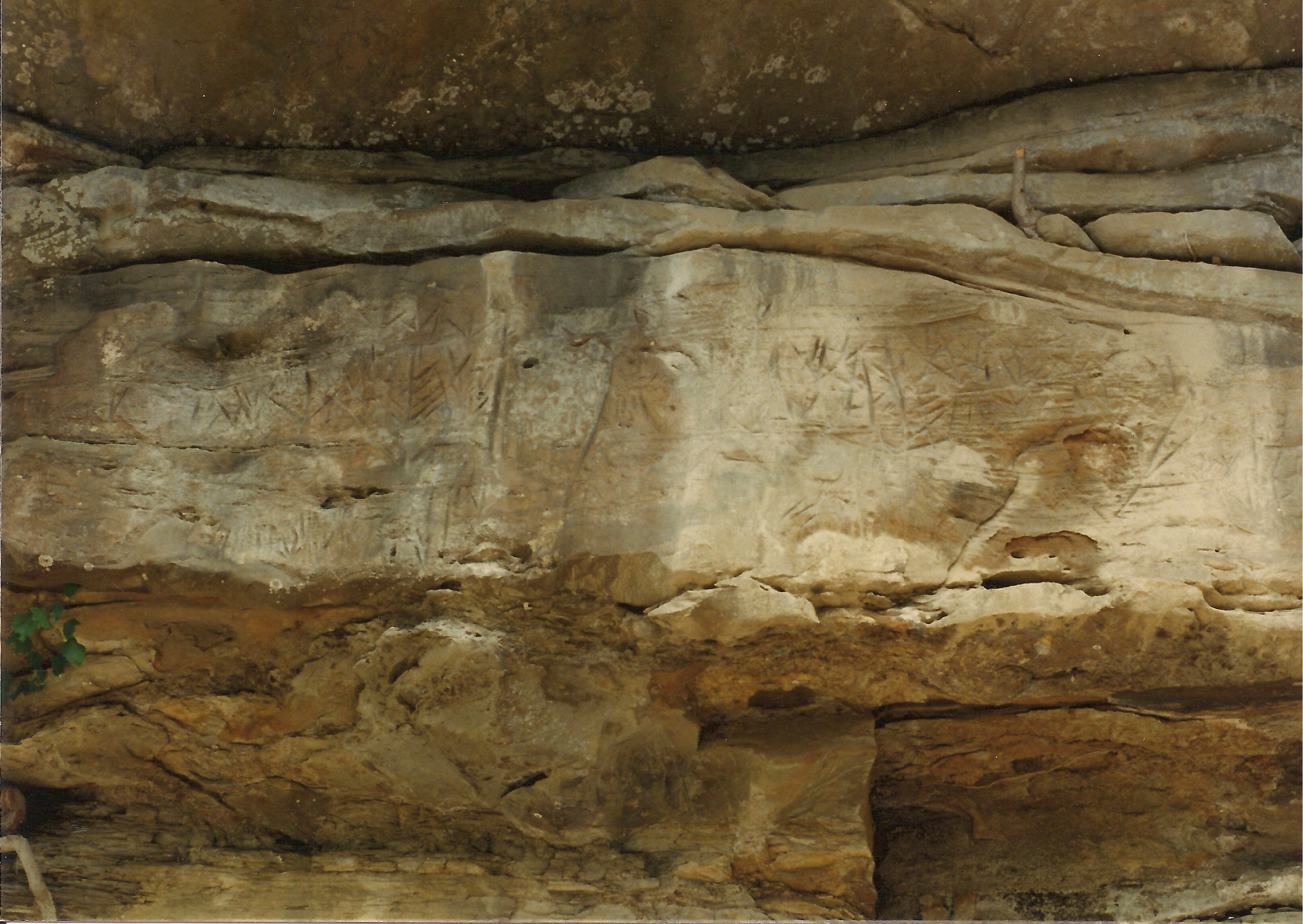
- Red Bird River Petroglyphs, in situ overlooking Red Bird River, circa 1988

- Location within Kentucky Location within the United States
- Location: Clay County, Kentucky
- Nearest city: Eriline, Kentucky
- Coordinates: 37°9′30.86″N 83°45′43.12″W
- Area: less than one acre
- MPS: Prehistoric Rock Art Sites in Kentucky MPS
- NRHP reference No.: 89001182

Significant dates
- Added to NRHP: September 8, 1989
- Removed from NRHP: December 4, 2003

The Red Bird River Petroglyphs, also known as the Red Bird Petroglyphs are a series of petroglyphs, or carvings, on a stone in Clay County, Kentucky. The rock originally was situated along the Red Bird River but was moved to a park in Manchester after it fell onto the roadway below in 1994.

The Red Bird River Petroglyphs have been assigned the Smithsonian trinomial identifier 15CY51 They are sometimes confused with the nearby Red Bird River Shelter Petroglyphs, 15CY52, a separate set of carvings on the opposite bank of the river.

On December 7, 1994, the 50-ton stone bearing the petroglyphs fell from a sandstone cliff above the Red Bird River, onto Kentucky Route 66 at Lower Red Bird. On December 9, 1994, it was transported to its present location in Rawlings/Stinson Park in Manchester, where it is roofed over and fenced. The original site was enrolled on the National Register of Historic Places in September 1989, but was delisted in 2003 after the inscribed stone was relocated.

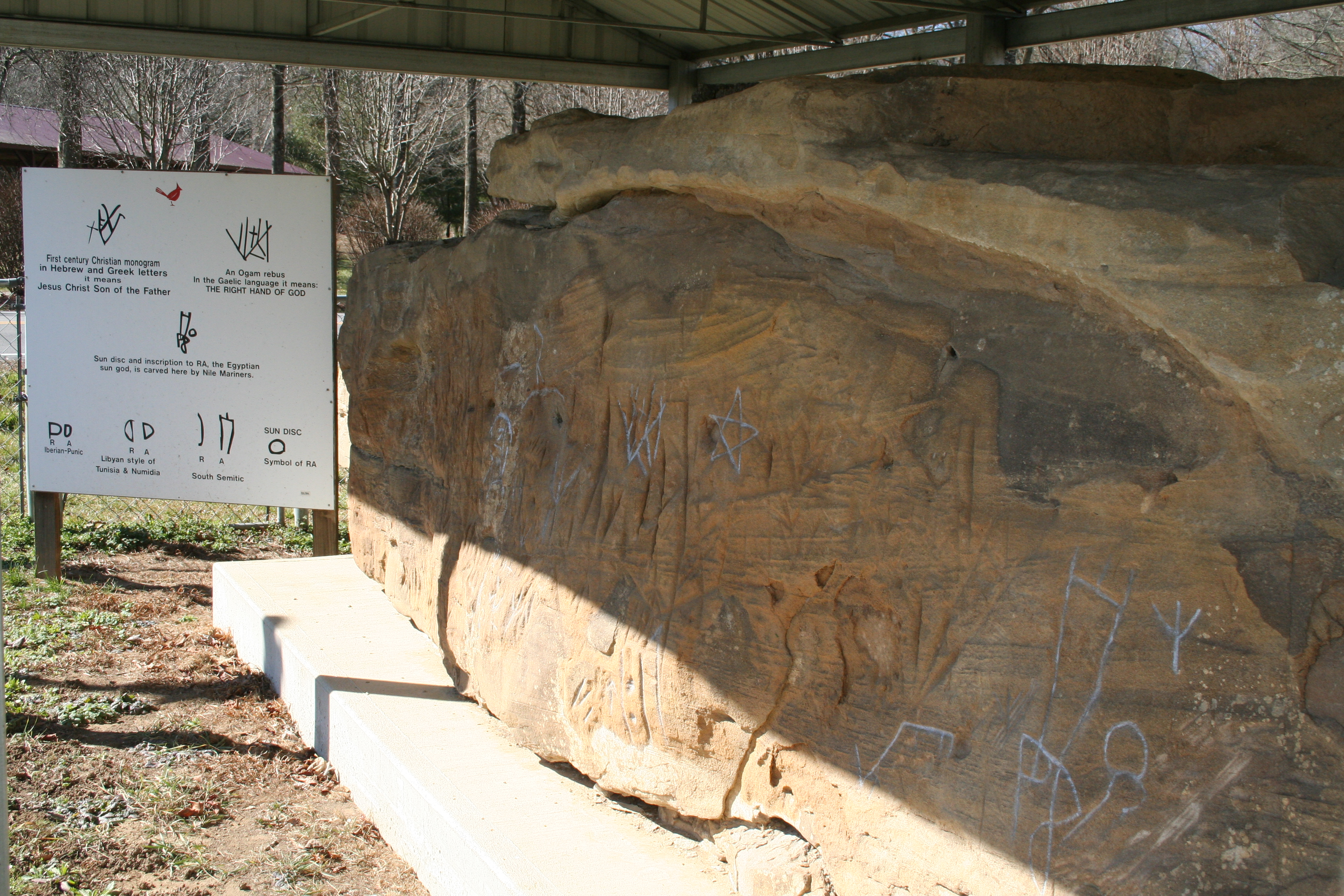
The petroglyphs as currently displayed at Rawlings/Stinson Park in Manchester

The inscribed surface measures 1.6 m (5.5 ft) in height and 6 m (20 ft) in length. The sharply incised and linear carvings have been described as "different from any of the previously reported Kentucky petroglyphs." Construction and later widening of Highway 66 undermined the inscribed surface and left it 16 feet above the roadway. It is estimated that it was originally at chest height before construction of the highway.

A state historical marker on the river attributes the markings to the Cherokee Chief Red Bird, for whom the river was named. In the book Rock Art of Kentucky the authors write that "No mention of Chief Red Bird could be found in several early Kentucky histories published in the nineteenth century. Therefore we contacted the Kentucky Historical Society and received the following letter (Wentworth 1969): "You will note that on our marker we say that he was a legendary Cherokee Indian. There is much legend in the area, but very little of any specific nature and no reliable dates are available."

== Interpretations ==
A sign adjacent to the relocated stone in Manchester states that "At least 8 Old World alphabets are engraved on it. These alphabets were extinct when Columbus arrived in the New World in 1492. The alphabets are first century Greek and Hebrew, Old Libyan, Old Arabic and Iberian-Punic which probably dates from the 9th century B.C. Ogam, Germanic runes and Tiffinag-Numidian are also on this stone."

Paul Myhre commented on this, writing that "An exact translation has not been accomplished. Neither has the origin of the language or marks on the stone been determined despite what the sign claims." Jason Colavito stated that "In reality, the carvings bear little to no resemblance to the alphabets they supposedly represent and are geometric inscriptions. They could be Native or colonial or both; they have yet to be studies to determine their origin. Fringe theorists have simply scoured various Old World scripts looking for similarities, and didn’t do a very good job of it, either. Nevertheless, Manchester commemorates these fringe interpretations with its interpretive sign."

The city of Manchester itself has said that "While some historians believe this is an artifact featuring eight Old World alphabets, others believe it is a remnant from the Cherokee nation when they lived in Kentucky."

== See also ==
- National Register of Historic Places listings in Clay County, Kentucky
