= Bear Creek (Red Bird River tributary) =

River in Kentucky, United States

Physical characteristics
- Source: Highest headwater of the three forks
  - coordinates: 37°09′05″N 83°41′14″W
- 2nd source: Confluence of the three forks
  - coordinates: 37°10′39″N 83°39′52″W
- Mouth: Red Bird River
  - location: 6.25 miles (10.06 km) upstream
  - coordinates: 37°13′42″N 83°38′09″W
  - elevation: 752 feet (229 m)

Basin features
- post offices: Barcreek: 37.2287016°N 83.6354704°W; Spurlock: 37.21259°N 83.63389°W

Bear Creek is a creek that is a tributary of the Red Bird River in Clay County, Kentucky.

Bear Creek received its name after a bear was shot there, according to local history.

== Tributaries and post offices ==
The mouth of Bear Creek is 6.25 miles (10.06 km) upstream on Red Bird River at an altitude of 752 feet (229 m) above sea level.

- Its major tributaries are:
  - a left branch 1 mile (1.6 km) upstream at altitude 765 feet (233 m)
  - a left branch 1.5 miles (2.4 km) upstream at altitude 780 feet (240 m)
  - a left branch 2.25 miles (3.62 km) upstream at altitude 825 feet (251 m)
  - a left branch 2.75 miles (4.43 km) upstream at altitude 860 feet (260 m)
  - a left branch 3 miles (4.8 km) upstream at altitude 875 feet (267 m)
  - Bowling Branch 3.75 miles (6.04 km) upstream at altitude 925 feet (282 m)
  - three forks 4.5 miles (7.2 km) upstream at (where 2 of the forks meet) altitude 950 feet (290 m)

=== Barcreek post office ===
Barcreek was established on 1900-03-07 by Elijah Herd, and remained in operation until March 1969. It was half a mile upriver on Bear Creek from its confluence with the Red Bird River. Its name was most likely a corruption of Bear Creek, but could also have been a reference to a large local sandbar. Herd's first choice of his own name had been rejected by the USPS because it clashed with an already existing postoffice in Boyd County.

Green L. Langdon moved it upriver in 1914, close to, or possibly at, the site of what was later to be Spurlock post office. It was relocated back to Bear Creek in the 1920s, and was 1/2 mile (0.80 km) up the creek when it closed in March 1969.

=== Spurlock post office ===
Spurlock post office was established on 1928-10-02, Silvania Herd's first choice of "Herd" similarly being rejected by the USPS because it then clashed with an already existing postoffice by that name in Jackson County. Named after the Spurlock family, descendants of settler William Spurlock (1815–1855) from North Carolina who had arrived at Bear Creek in 1835, it lasted until July 1988. It was located 1 mile upstream of the mouth of Banks Branch, a tributary of Red Bird River to the south of Bear Creek, to replace Barcreek post office after it moved back to Bear Creek.

=== General ===
Across a ridge lies Laurel Creek.

In 1918, Daniel Bowling had a mine 0.5 miles (0.80 km) upstream on Bowling Branch.

== See also ==
- List of rivers of Kentucky

== Sources ==
- Hodge, James Michael (1918). The coals of Goose Creek and its tributaries. Reports of the Kentucky Geological Survey 4th series 1912–1918. Vol. 4. Frankfort, Kentucky: The State Journal Company. (The coals of Goose Creek and its tributaries at the Internet Archive)
- Rennick, Robert M. (2000c). "Clay County — Post Offices". County Histories of Kentucky (176). Morehead State University.
- Rennick, Robert M. (2016b). "Place Names Beginning with the Letter B". Robert M. Rennick Manuscript Collection (17). Morehead State University.
- Rennick, Robert M. (28 August 2013). Kentucky Place Names. University Press of Kentucky. p. 56. ISBN 978-0-8131-4401-6.
