= Goose Creek (Oneida, Kentucky) =

River in Kentucky, United States

Physical characteristics
- Source
  - coordinates: 36°57′25″N 83°35′58″W
- Mouth: South Fork Kentucky River
  - location: Oneida, Kentucky
  - coordinates: 37°16′11″N 83°38′36″W
  - elevation: 755 feet
- Discharge
  - location: mouth
  - average: 429.87 cu ft/s (12.173 m^{3}/s) (estimate)

Goose Creek is a creek in Clay County, Kentucky. It is one of two tributaries at the head of the South Fork Kentucky River, the other being the Red Bird River. It is 40 miles (64 km) long.

== Tributaries and post offices ==
There have been 48 post offices on Goose Creek and its tributaries (including the post office at Manchester) up to the turn of the 21st century.

- The tributaries are:
  - Lick Branch 0.5 miles (0.80 km) upstream of Oneida
  - Sharper Branch 1 mile (1.6 km) upstream of Oneida
  - Furnace Branch 2.5 miles (4.0 km) upstream of Oneida at altitude 730 feet (220 m)
  - Laurel Branch 3.25 miles (5.23 km) upstream of Oneida at altitude 735 feet (224 m)
  - Hacker Branch 3.75 miles (6.04 km) upstream of Oneida
  - Wildcat Branch 4.5 miles (7.2 km) upstream of Oneida at altitude 740 feet (230 m)
    - forks 0.5 miles (0.80 km) upstream
  - Conolley Branch 6 miles (9.7 km) upstream of Oneida at altitude 745 feet (227 m)
  - Beech Creek 8 miles (13 km) upstream of Oneida at altitude 752 feet (229 m), whose post offices and tributaries are in its article, and is also a wildlife area
  - Laurel Creek 9.25 miles (14.89 km) upstream of Oneida at altitude 756 feet (230 m), whose post offices and tributaries are in its article
  - Jacks Creek (a.k.a. Jacks Branch) 11.75 miles (18.91 km) upstream of Oneida
  - Bolling Branch 15.5 miles (24.9 km) upstream of Oneida at altitude 775 feet (236 m)
  - Island Creek 16.25 miles (26.15 km) upstream of Oneida at altitude 780 feet (240 m)
    - Right Fork 1.5 miles (2.4 km) upstream at altitude 830 feet (250 m)
    - Left Fork 1.5 miles (2.4 km) upstream at altitude 830 feet (250 m)
  - Hart Branch 18.75 miles (30.18 km) upstream of Oneida at altitude 790 feet (240 m)
    - Coal Hollow 0.625 miles (1.006 km) upstream
  - Needmore Branch 19.5 miles (31.4 km) upstream of Oneida at altitude 790 feet (240 m)
  - Little Goose Creek 20 miles (32 km) upstream of Oneida at altitude 792 feet (241 m), whose post offices and tributaries are in its article
  - the Manchester town branch, a left branch at the town ford
  - Tanyard Branch 0.25 miles (0.40 km) upstream of Manchester at altitude 795 feet (242 m)
  - Horse Creek 1.5 miles (2.4 km) upstream of Manchester at altitude 800 feet (240 m), whose post offices and tributaries are in its article
  - Collins Creek 2.5 miles (4.0 km) upstream of Manchester at altitude 800 feet (240 m), whose post offices and tributaries are in its article
  - Lockhart Creek (a.k.a. Whites Branch) 4 miles (6.4 km) upstream of Manchester at altitude 810 feet (250 m) (Note: The distance and altitude measurements of Shop-Bottom Branch and Lockhart Creek mouths appear to have been accidentally swapped in the KGS Fourth Report. Topographic maps, contemporary and otherwise, show them the opposite way around.)
  - Shop-Bottom Branch 4.5 miles (7.2 km) upstream of Manchester at altitude 815 feet (248 m)
  - Rocky Branch 7.5 miles (12.1 km) upstream of Manchester at altitude 825 feet (251 m)
  - Granny Branch (a.k.a. Grannies Branch) 7.75 miles (12.47 km) upstream of Manchester at altitude 825 feet (251 m)
  - Wildcat Creek, location of Wildcat post office
  - Billy Branch (a.k.a. Billys Branch)8 miles (13 km) upstream of Manchester at altitude 825 feet (251 m), 2.5 miles (4.0 km) long and reportedly named for a member of the local Sevier family
  - Schoolhouse Branch 8.75 miles (14.08 km) upstream of Manchester at altitude 830 feet (250 m)
  - Martins Creek 9.5 miles (15.3 km) upstream of Manchester at altitude 830 feet (250 m), whose post offices and tributaries are in its article
  - Stewart Branch 10.25 miles (16.50 km) upstream of Manchester
  - Brown Branch (a.k.a. Blythe Branch) 11 miles (18 km) upstream of Manchester
  - Otter Creek 11.25 miles (18.11 km) upstream of Manchester at altitude 847 feet (258 m)
    - Right Fork 1.75 miles (2.82 km) upstream at altitude 847 feet (258 m)
      - Swafford Branch 2.5 miles (4.0 km) upstream at altitude 995 feet (303 m)
    - Left Fork 1.75 miles (2.82 km) upstream at altitude 847 feet (258 m)
      - Knob-Lick Branch 0.25 miles (0.40 km) upstream at altitude 910 feet (280 m)
      - Drum Branch 0.75 miles (1.21 km) upstream
      - left fork 1.75 miles (2.82 km) upstream
        - right fork 0.5 miles (0.80 km) upstream at altitude 1,250 feet (380 m)
      - right fork 1.75 miles (2.82 km) upstream
  - Timbertree Branch (a.k.a. Mud Lick, and in the 19th century Timbertree Creek) 12.75 miles (20.52 km) upstream of Manchester at altitude 865 feet (264 m)
  - Tom's Branch 13.5 miles (21.7 km) upstream of Manchester at altitude 870 feet (270 m)
  - Mill Branch 13.75 miles (22.13 km) upstream of Manchester at altitude 875 feet (267 m)
  - Mill Creek) 15 miles (24 km) upstream of Manchester at altitude 892 feet (272 m)
    - Right Fork 1.75 miles (2.82 km) upstream
    - Left Fork 1.75 miles (2.82 km) upstream
  - Asher Fork (a.k.a. Ashers Fork) 16.5 miles (26.6 km) upstream of Manchester at altitude 941 feet (287 m), 4 miles (6.4 km) long,
  - Stewart Branch 17.5 miles (28.2 km) upstream of Manchester at altitude 983 feet (300 m)
  - Hun Jackson Branch 18.75 miles (30.18 km) upstream of Manchester at altitude 1,050 feet (320 m)
  - Grubb Branch, previously known as Sams Branch
  - Indian Grave Branch 19.75 miles (31.78 km) upstream of Manchester at altitude 1,073 feet (327 m)
  - Buck Smith Branch 20.75 miles (33.39 km) upstream of Manchester at altitude 1,201 feet (366 m)
    - forks 1 mile (1.6 km) upstream at altitude 1,360 feet (410 m)

In the 19th century the head part of the creek downstream to the confluence with Collins Creek was considered to be its East Fork, but is now considered to be Goose Creek proper.

At the headwaters of Goose Creek 21.5 miles (34.6 km) upstream of Manchester at altitude 1,645 feet (501 m), lies Paint Gap, a gap that leads to the Stinking Creek tributary of the Cumberland River.

=== Lockhart Creek and Lockards post office ===
Lockhart Creek on late 19th and early 20th century geological survey maps was probably so named for the descendants of Patrick Lockhart, owner of a 1,000 acres (400 ha) military land grant on Goose in the 1780s. It is also sometimes Lockards Creek and sometimes named Whites Branch after its first settlers Hugh and Catherine White from Tennessee

Lockards post office was established on October 29, 1932, by postmaster H. W. Short, just below the mouth of Lockards Creek/Whites Branch, and closed in 1934. Short's first choice of name was White Hall.

In 1918 Beverly White lived 2 miles (3.2 km) upstream on Lockhart/Whites Creek, and Mrs S. R. White's heirs lived on Goose Creek proper 6 miles (9.7 km) upstream of Manchester.

=== On minor creeks ===
Hollingsworth post office was established on October 15, 1901, by postmaster William Hollansworth on the Right Fork of Island Creek to serve Brooks. Hollansworth wanted to use the name Brooks but it would have clashed with an existing post office in Bullitt County. It operated to April 1905, and after a short hiatus was reestablished by Elbert Hornsby on October 22, 1907, to run to September 1912.

Botto post office was established on January 14, 1928, by postmaster Docia Morgan Asher, whose first choice of name had been May. It was 1 mile up Billys Branch from the branch mouth. It closed in July 1964.

Otter Creek had a post office named Ogle.

=== Along Goose Creek itself ===
Hensley post office was established on October 11, 1905, by postmaster John H. Roberts with the name Hacker, which he renamed on January 11, 1906, to Hensley. It closed in 1965. Both were the names of prominent families in the county, respectively descendants of Massie Hacker and James and Nancy Hensley.

Treadway post office, probably at the mouth of Jacks Branch. ran from July 21, 1887, to May 28, 1894, named for, and with, postmasters John H. Treadway and Peter R. Treadway. Postmaster Elisha B. Treadway established Bernice post office at the same place on November 15, 1907. It moved a mile upstream along the branch some time before 1939, and closed in 1955. It was named for his daughter, he having submitted the names of both daughters (the other being Ethel), his sister Myrtle, and another family member Ora as choices of name when applying.

Seeley post office was established on February 10, 1898, by, and named for, postmaster Peasant D. Seeley and ran to January 1908. It had various locations, beginning with 1/4 mile (0.40 km) west of Little Goose and including at the vicinity of Lebanon Church (on Little Goose) under the postmastership of Mary E. Thacker the following year.

The precise location along Goose of Disappoint post office, established on January 19, 1883, but swiftly closed on February 15, 1883, by Perry Jarvis, is not known. Jarvis tried, and failed, to establish another post office in 1899 named Remedy, again location unknown.

Lipps post office was established at the mouth of Otter Creek in December 1901 by William O. B. Lipps, a lawyer born in 1869, but was rescinded in July 1902. It was successfully reestablished on May 27, 1903, by postmaster Robert Woods, to close in October 1935. Some time before December 1934 it had been relocated upstream to the mouth of Mud Lick branch.

Smallwood post office was established on August 3, 1876, by postmasters Jack Wages and John Lewis, and closed on February 13, 1879. It was named for a Smallwood family of pioneers on Goose, and located just downstream of Grubb Branch and 3 miles upstream of Mill Branch.

Eros post office was established on September 1, 1899, by postmaster Christopher Levi Harbon, and closed in 1902. It was just down from the head of Goose Creek. Harbon had originally wanted the name Callahan. It is possibly connected to the Erose post office on Pigeon Fork of Stinking Creek south over Paint Gap.

In 1918, the Jackson mill was 18.5 miles (29.8 km) upstream of Manchester on Goose itself, with Isaac Jackson having a mine 0.25 miles (0.40 km) upstream on Hun Jackson Branch, and a house 1.25 miles (2.01 km) upstream on Indian Grave Branch.

==== Goose Rock ====
Goose Rock post office was established on August 11, 1891, by postmaster Charles W. Sevier. It was located at several points along Goose Creek, starting with across the creek from the mouth of Schoolhouse Branch, then to the mouth of Rocky Branch, then up Rocky Branch, then to Grannies Branch, then to a place named The Cut (near its original location), and by the turn of the 21st century at the mouth of Grannies Branch.

The area encompassed by all of these locations and served by the post office, includes a Goose Rock consolidated school.

The name according to oral tradition supposedly originates with a goose making its nest on a rock in the middle of the creek. However, there actually is not such a rock to be found, and possibly the nest, if there ever was one, was on a bluff overlooking the post office.

==== Bright's Shade ====
Brightshade post office was on the creek itself at various locations through its history.

Originally Bright's Shade was the home of husband and wife Wiley (born 1838) and Ester Bright, and used as a stopping point for people travelling the creek. Coming from Knox County, they had settled at the mouth of Otter Creek on Goose Creek in 1862. Postmaster Milton L. Albertson took the name for the post office that he established there on August 6, 1883; the USPS later removed the possessive and combined the two words into one.

It was located at that and several other points along Goose Creek during its lifetime through to 1984, moving progressively upstream. In 1888 it was a mile upstream, by 1898 a further 1.5 miles (2.4 km) at the mouth Mud Lick, and by 1906 reaching its final location four miles upstream at the mouth of tributary Mill Creek.

It was a rural branch from 1968 onwards.

=== Icecliff and Asher's Fork ===
The Icecliff post office was established on June 18, 1904, by postmaster Green Arthur Sizemore. It was located 3 miles (4.8 km) upstream on the (Upper) Bear Creek of Red Bird River. The name came from a cliff covered with icicles that was across the road from the post office. It closed in September 1909 because of a fire in the Sizemores's house.

In 1918, William Sizemore had a mine on a left branch 2 miles (3.2 km) upstream on Upper Bear.

The post office was reestablished, this time as Ice Cliff on November 30, 1929, by postmaster Allie L. Sizemore. Allie's husband Carlo T. Sizemore was Green Arthur's nephew and the new location was at Allie and Carlo's store 0.5 miles (0.80 km) upstream of Upper Bear Creek mouth. Carlo died in November 1931, and the post office closed in August 1933.

It was reestablished a second time, this time as Ashers Fork, on January 25, 1940, by postmaster Daisy H. Schaffer. It was named for the creek where it was now located, Ashers Fork on Goose. Asher's Fork in turn was named after the Asher family of the area. Its final location was at the headwaters of Left Fork Asher's Fork, just over the gap from Right Fork Upper Bear Creek's headwaters. It closed in 1974.

== Other localities along the creek ==
- Goose Creek Salt Works

== See also ==
- List of rivers of Kentucky

== Sources ==
- Hodge, James Michael (1918). The coals of Goose Creek and its tributaries. Reports of the Kentucky Geological Survey 4th series 1912–1918. Vol. 4. Frankfort, Kentucky: The State Journal Company. (The coals of Goose Creek and its tributaries at the Internet Archive)
- Rennick, Robert M. (2000). Clay County — Post Offices. County Histories of Kentucky. Vol. 176. Morehead State University.
