= Jillson =

Jillson is a surname. Notable people with the surname include:

- Jeff Jillson (born 1980), American ice hockey player
- Joyce Jillson (1945–2004), American columnist, writer, actress and astrologist
- Justus K. Jillson, American educator and politician
- Willard Rouse Jillson (1890–1975), American historian, academic and geologist
