= Fall Rock, Kentucky =

Unincorporated community in Kentucky, United States

- Unincorporated community
- Location within Kentucky
- Coordinates: 37°13′11″N 83°47′18″W
- Country: United States
- State: Kentucky
- County: Clay
- Elevation: 1,024 ft (312 m)
- Time zone: UTC-5 (Eastern (EST))
  - Summer (DST): UTC-4 (EDT)
- ZIP code: 40932
- Area code: 606
- GNIS feature ID: 512119

Fall Rock is an unincorporated community in Clay County, Kentucky, United States. They are located on the Morgan Branch tributary of Laurel Creek, just under 1 mile upstream from the branch mouth, on United States Highway 421, the school across the road from the post office.

Fall Rock post office was established on 1924-05-22 by postmaster John Campbell, and named after the original name of Morgan Branch which was Falls Branch or Fall Rock Branch. This in turn came from the name of the 10 feet (3.0 m) high waterfall that powered a local grist mill and was also used for social events.

However, the village and school were originally named Pinhook, local oral histories stating that this was after a local fisherman who made fishing hooks out of safety pins bought in the local store. Named John Campbell (not the aforementioned postmaster) he gained the name "Pinhook" Campbell. The village and school were renamed after the post office when schooling was consolidated in the county in the 20th century.

== Sources ==
- Rennick, Robert M. (2000c). "Clay County — Post Offices". County Histories of Kentucky (176). Morehead State University.
