= Martins Creek (Kentucky) =

River in Kentucky, United States

Martins Creek Martin Creek

Physical characteristics
- Source: Martin Creek headwaters
  - coordinates: 37°03′36″N 83°37′33″W
- Mouth: Goose Creek
  - coordinates: 37°04′33″N 83°41′13″W
  - elevation: 830 feet (250 m)

Martins Creek (a.k.a. Martin Creek) is creek that is a tributary of Goose Creek in Clay County, Kentucky that used to have a Martins Creek post office. It is 4.5 miles (7.2 km) long and named for early settler Salathiel Martin.

== Tributaries and post offices ==
The Creek is 9.5 miles (15.3 km) from Manchester at altitude 830 feet (250 m) above sea level.

- Its major tributaries are:
  - Moses Branch 1.75 miles (2.82 km) upstream at an altitude of 905 feet (276 m)

=== Martin Creek post office ===
Its eponymous postoffice was established on July 10, 1876, by postmasters Marshall Corum and George D. Mahan, and closed on September 20, 1878. It was located just downstream on Goose Creek from the mouth of Martins.

=== Wages post office ===
The Wages postoffice was established on February 6, 1884, by William Wages, and closed in November 1885. It was located 3 miles (4.8 km) upstream along the creek from its mouth. His first choice of name had actually been Martins Creek.

In 1918, Silas Wages had a mine 0.25 miles (0.40 km) upstream on Moses Branch.

=== Plank post office ===
The Plank postoffice was established on December 7, 1906, by postmaster George W. Walker, and closed in September 1992. It was located 2 miles (3.2 km) upstream along the creek from its mouth. It served several lumber mills and the store of J. B. Walker, and local oral history is that its name was taken from a plank of wood propped against the wall of one of the aforementioned mills, a lumbermill practice that was used to boast that it had sawn the longest plank in the area.

=== General ===
J. B. Walker's mine was 0.5 miles (0.80 km) upstream on Moses Branch, and his house was 2 miles (3.2 km) upstream on Martin Creek itself.

== See also ==
- List of rivers of Kentucky

== Sources ==
- Hodge, James Michael (1918). The coals of Goose Creek and its tributaries. Reports of the Kentucky Geological Survey 4th series 1912–1918. Vol. 4. Frankfort, Kentucky: The State Journal Company. (The coals of Goose Creek and its tributaries at the Internet Archive)
- Rennick, Robert M. (2000c). "Clay County — Post Offices". County Histories of Kentucky (176). Morehead State University.
