= Jane Fox =

American dance educator (1899–1991)

- Jane Fox, from a 1959 publication
- Born: November 30, 1899; Clay County, Kentucky, U.S.
- Died: February 16, 1991 (aged 91); Bloomington, Indiana, U.S.
- Occupations: Dancer, choreographer, college professor

Jane Fox (November 30, 1899 – February 16, 1991) was an American dancer, choreographer, and educator. She founded the modern dance program at Indiana University, where she taught in the physical education department from 1927 to 1965.

== Early life and education ==
Fox was born in Clay County, Kentucky, the daughter of Uyles Jefferson Fox and Mittie Hammock Fox. Her father was a Baptist minister. She graduated from Columbia University in 1927. She completed a master's degree at Indiana University in 1934. She pursued further studies in modern dance in Vienna, and during summers at Bennington College.

== Career ==
Fox taught in the physical education program at Indiana University beginning in 1927. She became an assistant professor in 1933, and an associate professor in 1951. She taught modern dance at Indiana, helped found the school's dance major in 1949, and directed the school's modern dance troupe. She choreographed a campus production of Wagner's Parsifal, and a dance concert, The Book of Ruth, which was broadcast on Indianapolis television. She retired from Indiana University in 1965. In 1987 she was honored at a banquet marking the IU dance program's 60th anniversary.

Fox chaired the dance section of the American Alliance for Health, Physical Education, Recreation, and Dance from 1951 to 1953, and chaired the National Committee on Standards in Teacher Education in Dance. In retirement, she continued teaching exercise classes in the community.

== Publications ==
- "Let's Go Modern" (1943)
- "The Shortage of Dance Teachers" (1946)

== Personal life ==
Fox died in 1991, at the age of 91. Her papers are in the Indiana University Archives. Although the modern dance program she founded in IU's physical education department ended in 1991, the school's Department of Theatre, Drama, and Contemporary Dance now offers a dance major again, and awards a Jane Fox Dance Scholarship in her memory.
