= WTBK =

- Manchester, Kentucky; United States
- Frequency: 105.7 MHz
- Branding: K 105.7

Programming
- Format: Country
- Affiliations: ABC Radio, AP Radio, Premiere Radio Networks

History
- First air date: 1989

Technical information
- Licensing authority: FCC
- Facility ID: 39774
- Class: C3
- ERP: 5,000 watts
- HAAT: 218 meters
- Transmitter coordinates: 37°08′59″N 83°45′08″W

Links
- Public license information: Public file; LMS
- Website: wtbkfm.com

WTBK (105.7 FM), known as K-105.7, is a radio station broadcasting a country music format. Licensed to Manchester, Kentucky, United States, it features programming from ABC Radio, AP Radio and Premiere Radio Networks.
