= Ogle, Kentucky =

Unincorporated community in Kentucky, United States

- Unincorporated community
- Location within Kentucky
- Coordinates: 37°01′48″N 83°42′42″W
- Country: United States
- State: Kentucky
- County: Clay
- Elevation: 994 ft (303 m)
- Time zone: UTC-5 (Eastern (EST))
  - Summer (DST): UTC-4 (EDT)
- Area code: 606
- GNIS feature ID: 514310

Ogle is an unincorporated community in Clay County, Kentucky, United States. Ogle is located on Otter Creek Road 9 miles (14 km) south-southeast of Manchester. There is no town. It does not appear on the 1900 census, where people are listed rather as living in Otter Creek. The origin of the name is unknown. The Ogle post office was established in April 1893, with Morris Jackson as the first postmaster.

== Sources ==
- Rennick, Robert M. (2016). "Clay County — Place Names". Robert M. Rennick Manuscript Collection (53). Morehead State University.
