= South Fork Kentucky River =

River in Kentucky, United States

Physical characteristics
- Mouth: Kentucky River
  - location: just downstream of Beattyville
  - coordinates: 37°34′12″N 83°42′39″W

South Fork Kentucky River is a river in Kentucky in the United States. It is a fork of the Kentucky River that it joins just downstream of Beattyville. It is approximately 30 mi (48 km) long.

It was not originally named South Fork. Two of its three major tributaries are the forks at its head, the Red Bird River and Goose Creek, whose confluence is at Oneida. Before the 19th century, Goose Creek also incorporated what is today known as South Fork Kentucky River.

It flows generally north in a highly meandering course through the mountainous Cumberland Plateau region.

== Navigability ==
Several largely ineffective attempts were made in the 19th century to make South Fork navigable all of the way upstream to the Goose Creek Salt Works. An Act of the legislature on 1811-01-10 enabled a lottery to raise US$10,000 (equivalent to $193,500 in 2025) towards making this reach of the river navigable, and several times the scheme was allowed more time, but by 1813 still nothing had come of it. Between 1837 and 1845 US$3,022 (equivalent to $104,421 in 2025) was spent clearing obstructions from this reach.

One of the biggest impediments was an area known as The Narrows, a 1.2-mile-long (1.9 km) reach of the river 4.5 miles (7.2 km) downstream of the Goose Creek/Red Bird fork where it descended by 12.5 feet (3.8 m).

== Basin and hydrology ==
A survey of the reach between the Salt Works and the Soft Fork mouth was performed in 1836–1837. It recorded the entire length as 68.5 miles (110.2 km) descending 206.7 feet (63.0 m) in total, with the South Fork portion being 42 miles (68 km) and 131.5 feet (40.1 m) of that. It recorded the width as varying between 150 and 200 feet (46 and 61 m).

=== Floods ===
The Kentucky River basin, including South Fork and its tributaries, suffered a major flood in January and February 1957, although that did not exceed the highest on record for South Fork specifically, as Goose Creek's record at that point had been the flood of June and July 1947. Peak water levels at Manchester were 2 feet (0.61 m) lower than those of the 1947 flood. However at Booneville the peak levels were 1.7 feet (0.52 m) higher than those of 1947.

25 homes and 34 commercial buildings were flooded in Manchester; with an estimate cost of the damage exceeding US$200,000 (equivalent to $2,292,654 in 2025). 20 homes and 10 other buildings were flooded in Oneida, with approximately 80% of the town under water, in some places by as much as 9 feet (2.7 m). 31 homes and 1 other building were flooded in Booneville.

== Tributaries and other locations ==
- Its major tributaries include:
  - Sexton's Creek 14.375 miles (23.134 km) downstream of Oneida at altitude 648 feet (198 m), mouth at 37°21′33″N 83°40′56″W, whose further tributaries and locations are in its own article
  - Road Run 13.5 miles (21.7 km) downstream of Oneida at altitude 659 feet (201 m), mouth at 37°20′15″N 83°41′16″W headwaters at 37°18′34″N 83°42′02″W
    - Columbus Bishop Branch 0.75 miles (1.21 km) upstream, mouth at 37°19′20″N 83°41′38″W headwaters at 37°19′02″N 83°41′20″W
  - Rooster Branch 7.5 miles (12.1 km) downstream of Oneida at altitude 678 feet (207 m), mouth at 37°19′46″N 83°40′03″W headwaters at 37°19′18″N 83°41′01″W
  - Rocky Branch 6.75 miles (10.86 km) downstream of Oneida at altitude 682 feet (208 m), mouth at 37°19′13″N 83°39′50″W headwaters at 37°19′01″N 83°40′49″W
  - Lower Teges Creek 4.5 miles (7.2 km) downstream of Oneida at altitude 698 feet (213 m), mouth at 37°18′24″N 83°40′08″W headwaters at 37°17′20″N 83°43′42″W
  - Upper Teges Creek 4 miles (6.4 km) downstream of Oneida at altitude 715 feet (218 m), mouth at 37°17′34″N 83°39′59″W headwaters at 37°16′50″N 83°43′46″W
  - Crane Creek 2 miles (3.2 km) downstream of Oneida at altitude 722 feet (220 m), mouth at 37°17′04″N 83°40′32″W headwaters at 37°16′05″N 83°44′57″W
  - Red Bird River, mouth at 37°16′11″N 83°38′36″W, whose further tributaries and locations are in its own article
  - Goose Creek, mouth at 37°16′11″N 83°38′36″W, whose further tributaries and locations are in its own article

=== General ===
A road connects a left branch of Crane Creek via a gap to the Wildcat Branch of Goose Creek. A road connects a left branch of Upper Teges Creek to Crane Creek.

== See also ==
- List of rivers of Kentucky

== Sources ==
- Quinones, Ferdinand; Mull, Donald S.; York, Karen; Kendall, Victoria (August 1981). "Hydrology of Area 14, Eastern Coal Province, Kentucky". Open-File Report. Water Resources Investigations. Louisville, Kentucky: United States Geological Survey. doi:10.3133/ofr81137.
- Hodge, James Michael (1918). The coals of Goose Creek and its tributaries. Reports of the Kentucky Geological Survey 4th series 1912–1918. Vol. 4. Frankfort, Kentucky: The State Journal Company. (The coals of Goose Creek and its tributaries at the Internet Archive)
- Russell, Philip G. (1918). The coals of Sexton Creek and the tributaries of South Fork on the right between the mouth of Redbird Creek and the mouth of Sexton Creek. Reports series 4. Vol. 4 part 3. Kentucky Geological Survey. pp. 185–260.
- Rennick, Robert M. (2000). Clay County — Post Offices. County Histories of Kentucky. Vol. 176. Morehead State University.
- United States Army Corps of Engineers, Louisville District (1958-06-30). Review of Reports on Kentucky River and Tributaries. Louisville, Kentucky: Secretary of the Army.
- United States Geological Survey (1964). Floods of January–February 1957 in Southeastern Kentucky and Adjacent Areas. Geological Survey Water-supply Paper. United States Government Printing Office. 1652-A.
- Collins, Lewis; Collins, Richard Henry (1874). "Historical sketch of internal improvements in Kentucky". History of Kentucky. Collins Historical Sketches of Kentucky. Vol. 1. Covington, Kentucky: Collins & Company.
- Billings, Dwight B.; Blee, Kathleen M. (2000). The Road to Poverty: The Making of Wealth and Hardship in Appalachia. Cambridge University Press. ISBN 9780521655460.
