= Big Creek, Kentucky =

River in Kentucky, United States

Big Creek

Physical characteristics
- Source: Collins/Couch fork headwaters
  - coordinates: 37°09′56″N 83°28′19″W
- 2nd source: Upper forks of Old McHenry Fork
  - coordinates: 37°08′12″N 83°29′31″W
- 3rd source: Halls Fork headwaters
  - coordinates: 37°08′22″N 83°28′05″W
- 4th source: Left Fork Ulysses Fork headwaters
  - coordinates: 37°12′02″N 83°30′09″W
- Mouth: Red Bird River
  - location: 15 miles (24 km) upstream
  - coordinates: 37°09′59″N 83°34′56″W
  - elevation: 789 feet (240 m)

Big Creek is a 4.5 miles (7.2 km) long creek in Kentucky, United States whose headwaters are in Leslie County and that flows into the Red Bird River in Clay County. A postoffice and village are named for it. Its own name is likely purely descriptive of its frequent flooding and high water levels, as it is not otherwise one of the biggest tributaries of Red Bird River.

== Tributaries and post offices ==
The mouth of Big Creek is 15 miles (24 km) upstream on Red Bird River at an altitude of 789 feet (240 m) above sea level. Both the Daniel Boone Parkway and Kentucky Route 80 parallel its course from its mouth to where it splits into Halls and Collins/Couch Forks.

- Its major tributaries are:
  - Granny Branch 0.5 miles (0.80 km) upstream at altitude 810 feet (250 m), mouth at 37°09′48″N 83°34′29″W headwaters at 37°11′41″N 83°33′42″W
  - Smith Branch 1 mile (1.6 km) upstream at altitude 825 feet (251 m)
  - Bear Branch 1.875 miles (3.018 km) upstream at altitude 850 feet (260 m) and 2 miles (3.2 km) long, mouth at 37°09′50″N 83°32′57″W upper forks at 37°09′27″N 83°32′26″W
  - Ulysses Fork 2.5 miles (4.0 km) upstream at altitude 860 feet (260 m), mouth at 37°10′01″N 83°32′29″W
    - Schoolhouse Branch 0.375 miles (0.604 km) upstream at altitude 870 feet (270 m), mouth at 37°10′11″N 83°32′20″W upper forks at 37°11′01″N 83°32′28″W
    - Right Fork 1.75 miles (2.82 km) upstream at altitude 955 feet (291 m), confluence at 37°11′13″N 83°31′35″W upper forks at 37°11′51″N 83°31′07″W
    - Left Fork 1.75 miles (2.82 km) upstream at altitude 955 feet (291 m), mouth at 37°12′25″N 83°31′40″W
      - Meadow Fork 0.5 miles (0.80 km) upstream at altitude 1,015 feet (309 m), mouth at 37°11′44″N 83°31′51″W headwaters at 37°11′51″N 83°32′34″W
  - Chandler Branch 3.5 miles (5.6 km) upstream at altitude 975 feet (297 m), mouth at 37°10′07″N 83°31′23″W headwaters at 37°11′38″N 83°30′11″W
  - Collins Fork (a.k.a. Couch Fork) 4 miles (6.4 km) upstream at altitude 895 feet (273 m) paralleled by the Daniel Boone Parkway
    - Hollins Fork 0.75 miles (1.21 km) upstream at altitude 925 feet (282 m), mouth at 37°10′07″N 83°30′26″W upper forks at 37°11′15″N 83°27′57″W
      - Bob Fork 0.375 miles (0.604 km) upstream at altitude 965 feet (294 m), mouth at 37°10′27″N 83°29′49″W headwaters at 37°11′55″N 83°29′35″W
    - Half-way Branch 1.75 miles (2.82 km) upstream at altitude 1,070 feet (330 m)
    - three forks 3 miles (4.8 km) upstream at altitude 1,210 feet (370 m), at 37°10′04″N 83°28′09″W
  - Halls Fork (a.k.a. Hals Fork) 4 miles (6.4 km) upstream at altitude 895 feet (273 m), which U.S. 421 parallels, confluence with Collins Fork at 37°09′51″N 83°31′05″W
    - Old McHenry Fork 1 mile (1.6 km) upstream at altitude 945 feet (288 m), mouth at 37°09′24″N 83°30′21″W
      - McFadden Branch 0.75 miles (1.21 km) upstream at altitude 1,000 feet (300 m)
      - Patton Branch 0.75 miles (1.21 km) upstream at altitude 1,005 feet (306 m)
      - Poplar Gap Branch 0.75 miles (1.21 km) upstream at altitude 1,005 feet (306 m)

=== Big Creek village and post office ===
Big Creek, Kentucky
- village and post office
- Location within Kentucky
- Coordinates: 37°09′44″N 83°34′08″W
- Country: United States
- State: Kentucky
- County: Clay, Leslie
- Elevation: 866 ft (264 m)
- Time zone: UTC-5 (Eastern (EST))
  - Summer (DST): UTC-4 (EDT)
- ZIP code: 40914
- Area code: 606

The post office named after it was established by James Marcum on January 10, 1871. Originally located one mile up from the Red Bird River, it has moved several times up and down the creek, and as of 2000 was located three quarters of a mile up from the Red Bird, serving the Big Creek village. The village is located on U.S. Route 421, 10.7 miles (17.2 km) east of Manchester. Big Creek postoffice has ZIP code 40914.

=== Bear Branch post office ===
A Bear Branch post office was established by William Britton on November 10, 1923, named after the branch. Originally located a mere 50 feet (15 m) across the county line into Clay, it was moved on February 12, 1924, to Ulysses Creek by postmaster Thomas T. Hensley. It moved again when U.S. 421 was built, to a point next to the highway, and a further time in 1936 to its present location just below the branch 100 yards (91 m) from the Clay county line.

=== Jason post office ===
A Jason post office was established by postmaster Billie Jones to serve Hollins Fork on September 1, 1937. During its lifetime from then until July 1965, it was located in three different places along the fork, above the Bear Branch post office, ending up less than 0.5 miles (0.80 km) from the original site of Obed post office. The postmaster's original choice of name, Elim, was disregarded because of potential confusion with an Elem post office in Rockcastle County.

=== Obed post office ===
Couch Fork used to be named Collins Fork, and the Obed post office, founded on January 26, 1903, by postmaster Levi Couch, used to lie between Collins and Hollins Forks. Obed was in 1936 moved downhill to the Twin Branch tributary of Collins/Couch Fork and closed in 1938.

=== General ===
In 1918, P.D. Marcum had a mine 1.25 miles (2.01 km) upstream on Granny Branch, and Thomas A. Bird had one on a minor fork of Bear 0.75 miles (1.21 km) upstream.

Lee Crawford had two mines, one 0.175 miles (0.282 km) upstream and one 2 miles (3.2 km) upstream on Bear Branch.

Thomas Hensley had one on a minor fork of Ulysses Fork 0.75 miles (1.21 km) upstream, Felix Roberts had one on a minor fork of Right Fork Ulysses Fork 1.75 miles (2.82 km) upstream, and J. M. Finley had one at the mouth of Meadow Fork and one 0.75 miles (1.21 km) upstream on Left Fork Ulysses Fork.

H.B. Collins's mine was on a minor fork of Half-Way Branch 0.75 miles (1.21 km) upstream. Wesley McFadden's was on McFadden Branch 0.5 miles (0.80 km) upstream. Hiram Collins lived 2.5 miles (4.0 km) upstream on Halls Fork where there had been an older Collins mine.

On Big Creek itself, Wiley Spurlock had a mine 1.25 miles (2.01 km) upstream, and Hiram Sizemore had one on a minor fork opposite the mouth of Collins.

== Sources ==
- Hodge, James Michael (1918). The coals of Goose Creek and its tributaries. Reports of the Kentucky Geological Survey 4th series 1912–1918. Vol. 4. Frankfort, Kentucky: The State Journal Company. (The coals of Goose Creek and its tributaries at the Internet Archive)
- Rennick, Robert M. (2000c). "Clay County — Post Offices". County Histories of Kentucky (176). Morehead State University.
- Rennick, Robert M. (2000l). "Leslie County — Post Offices & Place Names". County Histories of Kentucky (241). Morehead State University.
