= Horse Creek (Kentucky) =

Unincorporated community in Clay County, Kentucky

Physical characteristics
- Source: Horse Creek headwaters
  - coordinates: 37°03′50″N 83°52′56″W
- 2nd source: Pigeon Roost Branch headwaters
  - coordinates: 37°07′40″N 83°51′00″W
- 3rd source: Crawfish Branch headwaters
  - coordinates: 37°05′39″N 83°47′34″W
- 4th source: House Branch headwaters
  - coordinates: 37°07′52″N 83°49′35″W
- Mouth: Goose Creek
  - location: 1.5 miles (2.4 km) upstream from the mouth of Goose
  - coordinates: 37°08′20″N 83°45′35″W
  - elevation: 800 feet (240 m)

Horse Creek is a creek a tributary of Goose Creek river in Clay County, Kentucky. It is 1.5 miles (2.4 km) upstream of Manchester on Goose at an altitude of 800 feet (240 m).

The Cumberland and Manchester Railway built a spur line up the creek, and it has been the site of operations of at least eight coal mining companies. The name comes, according to local tradition, from the proliferation of "horseweed" in the creek valley.

== Tributaries and post offices ==
- Its major tributaries are:
  - Muddy Gap Branch 0.25 miles (0.40 km) upstream at an altitude of 805 feet (245 m)
  - Crawfish Branch 2 miles (3.2 km) upstream at an altitude of 820 feet (250 m), mouth 37°07′13″N 83°46′46″W
  - PawPaw Branch 2.75 miles (4.43 km) upstream at an altitude of 830 feet (250 m), mouth 37°07′19″N 83°47′23″W
    - Yager Branch 0.5 miles (0.80 km) upstream, mouth 37°07′39″N 83°47′39″W
  - Hurd Branch 3.15 miles (5.07 km) upstream at an altitude of 850 feet (260 m)
  - Webb Branch 3.75 miles (6.04 km) upstream at an altitude of 865 feet (264 m)
  - Johnson Branch 4.25 miles (6.84 km) upstream at an altitude of 885 feet (270 m), mouth 37°06′37″N 83°48′41″W
  - House Branch 4.75 miles (7.64 km) upstream at an altitude of 900 feet (270 m), mouth 37°06′31″N 83°49′14″W
  - Pigeon Roost Branch 2.5 miles (4.0 km) long and 6.75 miles (10.86 km) upstream at an altitude of 950 feet (290 m), mouth 37°05′57″N 83°50′45″W

=== General ===
In 1918, E. G. Hurd had a mine 0.25 miles (0.40 km) upstream on the eponymous Hurd Branch.

=== Paw Paw Branch and Siebert ===
The Paw Paw Branch is the location of Siebert town, railroad depot, and erstwhile post office.

Thomas Sibert had a mine 0.25 miles (0.40 km) upstream on Paw Paw.

=== Crawfish Branch and Hima post office ===
The mouth of the Crawfish Branch is the location of the Crawfish post office, established on March 29, 1907, by postmaster Hugh Gregory. It is 3 miles (4.8 km) south of Manchester and the creek that it serves is 2 miles (3.2 km) long. However, the station on the spur line, a loading depot for the coal mining operations, was named Hima. On May 4, 1920, then postmaster David Gregory renamed the post office to the name of the railway stop.

=== Pigeon Roost Branch ===
The mouth of the Pigeon Roost Branch was the original location of the Pigeon Roost post office, established on 1888-05-11 by storekeeper and postmaster Jefferson D. Rowland. Local oral history is that they were named after a large flock of pigeons roosting on timber. The postoffice moved around to several locations along Horse Creek and Kentucky Route 80 over the years, its name becoming Pigeonroost in 1894, until it closed in 1974, its final location being two miles downstream of Pigeon Roost Creek and 5 miles (8.0 km) south-west of Manchester.

== Coal ==
The coal beneath the creek is part of Kentucky's Breathitt Formation.

Pollution caused by the mining operations was measured in 1969. The pH of the river water was 4.2 in Horse Creek itself, and 5.8 in Goose Creek. Fish kills were reported for Goose Creek, and both Goose Creek and downstream South Fork of Kentucky River were occasionally acidic. The problems of acidic outflow and sediment affecting the downstream waters of Goose continued to be reported in 1979.

The Cumberland and Manchester Railway railway spur was built in 1918, contracted to L.L. Richardson for building the road and John C. White for supplying 200,000 feet (61,000 m) of timber for trestles.

== See also ==
- List of rivers of Kentucky

== Sources ==
- Hodge, James Michael (1918). The coals of Goose Creek and its tributaries. Reports of the Kentucky Geological Survey 4th series 1912–1918. Vol. 4. Frankfort, Kentucky: The State Journal Company. (The coals of Goose Creek and its tributaries at the Internet Archive)
- Rennick, Robert M. (2000c). "Clay County — Post Offices". County Histories of Kentucky (176). Morehead State University.
- Rennick, Robert M. (2016). "Clay County — Place Names". Robert M. Rennick Manuscript Collection (53). Morehead State University.
- Rice, Charles L.; Hiett, John K.; Koozmin, Elizabeth D. (1994). "Glossary of Pennsylvanian stratigraphic names, central Appalachian basin". In Rice, Charles L. (ed.). Elements of Pennsylvanian Stratigraphy, Central Appalachian Basin. Geological Society of America Special Paper. Vol. 294. Geological Society of America. pp. 115–156. doi:10.1130/SPE294-p115. ISBN 9780813722948.
- United States Office of Appalachian Studies (1969). Development of Water Resources in Appalachia: The incidence and formation of mine drainage pollution. Vol. 18. United States Army Corps of Engineers.
- Bradfield, Arthur D.; Porter, Stephen D. (1990). Summary of biological investigations relating to surface-water quality in the Kentucky River basin (PDF). Water-Resources Investigations Report. United States Geological Survey. 90-4051.
- "RAILWAY NEWS". The Railway and Engineering Review. Vol. 62. Railway Review, Incorporated. June 8, 1918.
