= Littleton, Kentucky =

Unincorporated community in Kentucky, United States

- CDP
- Location within Kentucky
- Coordinates: 37°09′45″N 83°45′17″W
- Country: United States
- State: Kentucky
- County: Clay
- Elevation: 902 ft (275 m)
- Time zone: UTC-5 (Eastern (EST))
  - Summer (DST): UTC-4 (EDT)
- Area code: 606
- GNIS feature ID: 2629640

Littleton is a Census Designated Place in Clay County, Kentucky, United States. Littleton is located on the northern border of Manchester.
