= Willard Rouse Jillson =

American historian, academic and geologist (1890–1975)

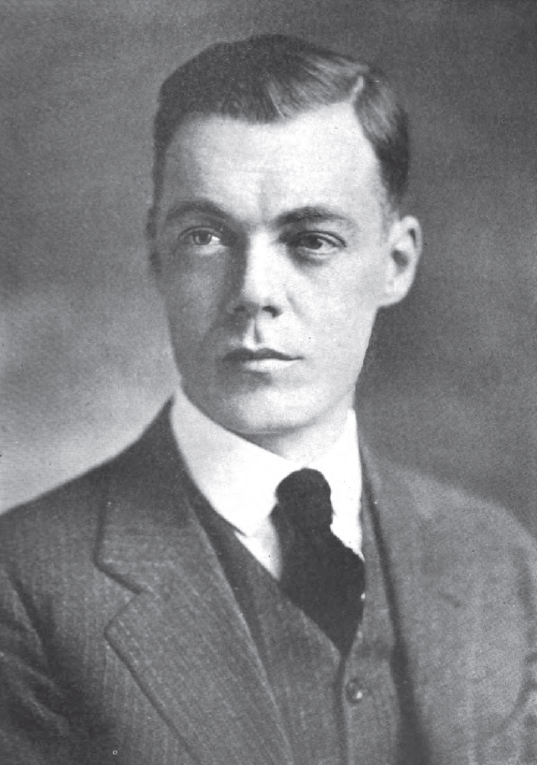
Portrait of Willard Rouse Jillson

Willard Rouse Jillson (May 28, 1890 – October 4, 1975) was a Kentucky historian, academic, and geologist who authored numerous books on Kentucky politicians and geology matters pertaining to the State.

Jillson taught geology in Lexington at the University of Kentucky in 1918 and later at Transylvania University in 1947. He served in various government positions, notably as Kentucky State Geologist and director of the Sixth Kentucky Geological Survey.

He died in 1975 and was buried in the Frankfort Cemetery in Frankfort, Kentucky.
