= Little Goose Creek (Kentucky) =

River in Kentucky, United States

Physical characteristics
- Source: Little Goose Creek headwaters
  - coordinates: 37°06′51″N 83°55′47″W
- 2nd source: Hooker Branch right fork headwaters
  - coordinates: 37°07′48″N 83°50′18″W
- 3rd source: Rader Creek headwaters
  - coordinates: 37°13′46″N 83°50′41″W
- 4th source: Urban Fork headwaters
  - coordinates: 37°07′19″N 83°53′19″W
- 5th source: Grays Fork headwaters
  - coordinates: 37°12′57″N 83°52′47″W
- Mouth: Goose Creek
  - coordinates: 37°09′33″N 83°45′58″W
  - elevation: 795 feet (242 m)

Little Goose Creek is a tributary of Goose Creek river in Clay County with headwaters in Laurel County in the U.S. state of Kentucky. It is 16.5 miles (26.6 km) long with its confluence with Goose just north of Manchester, at an altitude of 795 feet (242 m).

== Tributaries and post offices ==
- Its major tributaries are:
  - Greenbrier Branch 0.5 miles (0.80 km) upstream at an altitude of 795 feet (242 m)
  - Stone Coal Branch 2 miles (3.2 km) upstream at an altitude of 810 feet (250 m)
  - Roark Branch (a.k.a. Shed Branch) 3.375 miles (5.432 km) upstream at an altitude of 830 feet (250 m)
  - Raders Creek 6.5 miles (10.5 km) long and 3.5 miles (5.6 km) upstream at an altitude of 830 feet (250 m), and named for the descendants of Henry Rader who lived at Ponders Mill on the creek
    - Spice Gap Branch 1.75 miles (2.82 km) upstream at an altitude of 925 feet (282 m)
    - Rich Hollow 2 miles (3.2 km) upstream
    - Sandlin Branch 3 miles (4.8 km) upstream at an altitude of 1,000 feet (300 m)
  - Ephram Branch 4.125 miles (6.639 km) upstream at an altitude of 840 feet (260 m)
  - Wall Branch 0.75 miles (1.21 km) upstream
  - Hooker Branch 4.375 miles (7.041 km) upstream at an altitude of 845 feet (258 m)
    - Its several forks 1.75 miles (2.82 km) upstream
  - Grays Fork 5.25 miles (8.45 km) long and 6.25 miles (10.06 km) upstream at an altitude of 870 feet (270 m)
    - Rogers Branch 0.25 miles (0.40 km) upstream
    - Tinkers Branch (also Tinker Branch) 1 mile (1.6 km) long and 1 mile (1.6 km) upstream, and according to oral tradition named for an old tinker with a hidden cache of gold
    - Dry Branch 2 miles (3.2 km) upstream
      - Its several forks 3 miles (4.8 km) upstream at an altitude of 990 feet (300 m), off the right fork of which is:
        - Wells Branch 0.25 miles (0.40 km) upstream
  - Kinkead Branch (also spelled Kinkaid) 7 miles (11 km) upstream at an altitude of 890 feet (270 m)
    - Road Fork 0.5 miles (0.80 km) upstream
  - Urban Branch, renamed for the postoffice and originally named Philpot Fork after its postmasters, 8 miles (13 km) upstream at an altitude of 910 feet (280 m)
  - Rock Gap Branch 9 miles (14 km) upstream at an altitude of 950 feet (290 m)
  - Brock Branch 9.75 miles (15.69 km) upstream at an altitude of 980 feet (300 m)

=== Raders Creek ===
Sory postoffice was established on 1926-07-91 by postmaster Margaret Bowling Garrison, named after a friend of her husband J.B. from World War One. It being located close to the mouth of Rader Creek, her first choice of name was in fact Rader. It closed in June 1933.

In 1918, Lucy Ledford had a mine 0.25 miles (0.40 km) upstream on Rader, the Cotton heirs had one on a minor fork 0.5 miles (0.80 km) upstream, John Gibson one on Rader itself 3.375 miles (5.432 km) upstream, James Lewis one on Rader 4.25 miles (6.84 km) upstream, and Niah Resner one 4.5 miles (7.2 km) upstream.

William Ponder's mill was 1.875 miles (3.018 km) upstream, and his mine was 0.25 miles (0.40 km) upstream on Rich Hollow. Tip Barron's mill was 4 miles (6.4 km) upstream on Rader.

Sidell post office was 2.5 miles (4.0 km) upstream on Rader, where James M. Baker had a mine.

William Sandlin's mine was on Sandlin, 0.5 miles (0.80 km) upstream.

=== Hooker ===
Hooker postoffice was established om 1905-04-06 by Matilda L. Craft and closed in 1974. It was probably named after local family James and Emily Hooker. Originally located 1 mile up the Hooker Branch, sometime before 1939 it moved roughly 1 1/2 miles (2.4 km) further up the branch to roughly the location of the Daniel Boone Parkway.

M. V. Craft had a mine 0.75 miles (1.21 km) upstream on Hooker at an altitude of 1,015 feet (309 m). Jasper Munsey had a mine on a minor fork of Hooker 1.375 miles (2.213 km) upstream on Hooker at an altitude of 1,015 feet (309 m).

=== Philpot/Urban post office and mines ===
Urban postoffice was established on 1898-03-17 by husband and wife postmasters Granville V. and Millie Philpot on Philpot Fork. It moved to several points along the branch, including 1 mile upstream where the Parkway is now, back down to Little Goose, and some time before 1948 1/4 mile (0.40 km) upstream of the mouth of Kinkead Branch; and it closed in 1980.

Granville Philpot had a mine 2 miles (3.2 km) upstream on his eponynmous fork. R. T. Hayre had one on a minor fork of Philpot 0.125 miles (0.201 km) upstream and Thomas Hayre one at the 1918 location of Urban post office 1 mile (1.6 km) upstream. William Longworth's mine was 2.5 miles (4.0 km) upstream.

=== Rock Gap ===
Rockgap postoffice was established on 1904-06-10 by Catharine Philpot and ran to October 1915. It was named for a Rock Gap that it was at, or near; whose own location is unclear. One 1914 (Selliers') geological survey map assigns it to a small stream 1 mile upstream of Philpot/Urban Branch; other 20th century maps place it west of that branch between Seeley postoffice, the postoffices of Byron and Marydell, and Laurel County.

Irvine Hoskins had a mine on Rock Gap Branch 0.25 miles (0.40 km) upstream at an altitude of 1,075 feet (328 m).

=== Grays Fork ===
Grays Fork of Little Goose was the location of Grace and Tinker post offices; the latter established at the mouth of Tinkers Fork near Bethany Chapel on 1889-12-31 by postmaster Francis M. Eagle and running to July 1938, at two locations along the fork. Eagle originally wanted to use his own surname, but then chose the creek name.

The story of the name of Grace post office is that United States Congressman John D. White was so impressed with the work of his housekeeper Grace Kelly (1880–1956) that he suggested her name when the new postoffice was being established. Kelly, the daughter of George Kelly of Goose Rock, married Harry Jerome Nicholson in 1903 and some time later moved to Indiana.

The post office was established on 1898-03-09 by postmaster Dr. Iredell C. Wyatt on or just above the Tanyard Branch tributary of Grays Fork, 2.5 miles (4.0 km) upstream of Tinker Branch. It was subsequently moved twice: in 1912 to Goslin Branch by Philip Fields, and sometime before its closure in 1975 one mile down Grays Fork.

== See also ==
- List of rivers of Kentucky

== Sources ==
- Hodge, James Michael (1918). The coals of Goose Creek and its tributaries. Reports of the Kentucky Geological Survey 4th series 1912–1918. Vol. 4. Frankfort, Kentucky: The State Journal Company. (The coals of Goose Creek and its tributaries at the Internet Archive)
- Rennick, Robert M. (2000c). "Clay County — Post Offices". County Histories of Kentucky (176). Morehead State University.
