= Laurel Creek (Kentucky) =

Physical characteristics
- Source: Laurel Creek headwaters
  - coordinates: 37°13′46″N 83°49′29″W
- 2nd source: Falls Branch headwaters
  - coordinates: 37°12′52″N 83°48′13″W
- 3rd source: Collins Fork headwaters
  - coordinates: 37°15′36″N 83°45′37″W
- Mouth: Goose Creek
  - coordinates: 37°12′59″N 83°43′03″W
  - elevation: 756 feet (230 m)

Laurel Creek is a creek that is a tributary of Goose Creek river in Clay County, Kentucky. It is 7.5 miles (12.1 km) long. The name comes from the proliferation of mountain laurel on its riverbanks.

== Tributaries and post offices ==
The Creek mouth on Goose is 0.75 miles (1.21 km) upstream of the mouth of Beech Creek, and 9.25 miles (14.89 km) upstream from Oneida.

- Its major tributaries are:
  - Skull Branch 0.875 miles (1.408 km) upstream, mouth at 37°13′30″N 83°43′52″W
  - Mill Pond Hollow 1.5 miles (2.4 km) upstream, mouth at 37°13′37″N 83°43′52″W
  - Chicken Branch 1.75 miles (2.82 km) upstream at an altitude of 825 feet (251 m) , mouth at 37°13′41″N 83°44′26″W
  - Orchard Branch 2.25 miles (3.62 km) upstream at an altitude of 830 feet (250 m), mouth at 37°13′56″N 83°44′53″W
  - Collins Branch 2.375 miles (3.822 km) upstream, mouth at 37°13′59″N 83°44′53″W
  - Falls Branch (a.k.a. Morgan Branch) 4 miles (6.4 km) upstream at an altitude of 890 feet (270 m), mouth at 37°13′50″N 83°46′56″W
  - Hogskin Branch 4.5 miles (7.2 km) upstream, mouth at 37°14′02″N 83°47′32″W

=== Fall Rock, Hubbardsville, and Laurel Creek post office ===
Laurel Creek's eponymous post office was established by Joseph Hubbard on 1865-04-21, lasting until 1968. It was originally located at the mouth of what is now named Morgan Branch, that used to be named Falls Branch, and primarily served the area of Hubbardsville. It moved 3 miles (4.8 km) downstream to the mouth of Collins Branch some time before 1902. It was a rural branch of Manchester post office from 1966 until its closure.

Morgan Branch is also the location of the village, school, and post office of Fall Rock. Fall Rock post office was established on 1924-05-22 by postmaster John Campbell, and named after the original name of Morgan Branch which was Falls Branch or Fall Rock Branch. This in turn came from the name of the 10 feet (3.0 m) high waterfall that powered a local grist mill and was also used for social events.

However, the village and school were originally named Pinhook, local oral histories stating that this was after a local fisherman who made fishing hooks out of safety pins bought in the local store. Named John Campbell (not the aforementioned postmaster) he gained the name "Pinhook" Campbell. The village and school were renamed from Pinhook to Fall Rock after the post office when schooling was consolidated in the county in the 20th century.

Hubbardsville's second post office was named Caution, from 1902 to 1918, although postmaster George Hall wanted to call it Clio after his 5-year-old daughter. That clashed with an existing post office of the same name in Whitley County, however.

=== Millpond ===
The Millpond post office was originally named Bessie by postmaster John L. Campbell, who operated it between 1907-11-15 and 1909-06-15, possibly after his wife Elizabeth. Its second postmaster Oscar Hornsby, who reëstablished it on 1921-05-14 in his own general store near to Lower Laurel School, wanted to retain the name; but the name Millpond was assigned instead. Local oral histories disagree as to the origin of this name. It was either named after the pond of Joe Hornsby's flour mill that was built in the 1880s, or it was named after the pond of an old sawmill. Either way, the mill has long since vanished; and at the time of closure in August 1963 the postoffice was located just downstream of Mill Pond Hollow.

=== General ===
In 1918, on Laurel itself John Coldiron had a mine 0.5 miles (0.80 km) upstream, Joseph L. Hornsby had one 1 mile (1.6 km) upstream, James Barnett one 2.175 miles (3.500 km) upstream, Hannibal Morgan one 2.75 miles (4.43 km) upstream, Daniel Baker one 3.25 miles (5.23 km) upstream, and George Hall one 3.875 miles (6.236 km) upstream.

Mrs Hounschell had one 0.75 miles (1.21 km) upstream on Chicken Branch. John Howard's mine was 0.5 miles (0.80 km) upstream on Orchard Branch. Elijah Campbell's was 1.25 miles (2.01 km) upstream on Falls Branch.

Kentucky Route 11 mostly follows the course of the Creek.

=== Connections ===
A gap at the head of Hogskin Branch connects to the Rader Branch of Little Goose Creek.

== See also ==
- List of rivers of Kentucky

== Sources ==
- Hodge, James Michael (1918). The coals of Goose Creek and its tributaries. Reports of the Kentucky Geological Survey 4th series 1912–1918. Vol. 4. Frankfort, Kentucky: The State Journal Company. (The coals of Goose Creek and its tributaries at the Internet Archive)
- Rennick, Robert M. (2000c). "Clay County — Post Offices". County Histories of Kentucky (176). Morehead State University.
