= Pigeon Roost Creek (Indiana) =

Stream in Indiana, U.S.

Coordinates: 38°41′45″N 85°45′39″W

Pigeon Roost Creek is a stream in the U.S. state of Indiana.

Pigeon Roost Creek was named for the many passenger pigeons that once roosted there.

== See also ==
- List of rivers of Indiana
