= Pigeon Roost Creek (Missouri) =

Stream in the U.S. state of Missouri

Coordinates: 39.470614°N 91.727557°W

Pigeon Roost Creek is a stream in Monroe County in the U.S. state of Missouri.

Pigeon Roost Creek was so named on account of the passenger pigeons which once were numerous in the area.

== See also ==
- List of rivers of Missouri
