= Red Bird River =

River in Kentucky, United States

- Red Bird River near the county line of Clay and Bell Counties

Physical characteristics
- Mouth: South Fork Kentucky River
  - coordinates: 37°16′11″N 83°38′36″W

The Red Bird River (a.k.a. Red Bird Creek or Redbird Creek) is one of two tributaries at the head of the South Fork Kentucky River, the other being the Goose Creek. It is located in the Daniel Boone National Forest, in the southeast of the U.S. state of Kentucky. It is 34.3 miles (55.2 km) long and drains the eastern half of Clay County.

== Hydrology and basin ==
At its mouth, the Red Bird River's mean annual discharge is 336.62 cubic feet per second (9,532 L/s). It drains an area of 195.7 square miles (507 km^{2}). Its overall gradient is 7.2 feet per mile (1.36 m/km).

== Tributaries and other locations ==
The headwaters of Red Bird River are in north-eastern Bell County, separated from the rest of that county by the Kentucky Ridge. It constitutes the county line between Clay and Leslie Counties for a 6.5 miles (10.5 km) reach. Kentucky Route 66 follows the course of the River from Oneida to the Clay–Bell County line.

- Its major tributaries include:
  - Bear Creek 6.25 miles (10.06 km) upstream at altitude 752 feet (229 m), mouth at 37°13′43″N 83°38′09″W, whose further tributaries and locations are in its own article
  - Banks Branch 8.5 miles (13.7 km) upstream at altitude 762 feet (232 m), mouth at 37°12′35″N 83°38′01″W headwaters at 37°12′02″N 83°38′25″W
  - Sam Branch 10.5 miles (16.9 km) upstream at altitude 773 feet (236 m), mouth at 37°12′10″N 83°37′12″W headwaters at 37°11′43″N 83°37′23″W
  - Dry Branch 10.75 miles (17.30 km) upstream at altitude 774 feet (236 m), mouth at 37°12′08″N 83°36′42″W headwaters at 37°13′29″N 83°35′44″W
  - Hector Creek 11.5 miles (18.5 km) upstream at altitude 775 feet (236 m), mouth at 37°11′40″N 83°36′24″W headwaters at 37°07′34″N 83°40′25″W
    - Ben Branch 1 mile (1.6 km) upstream at altitude 800 feet (240 m)
    - a right branch 2 miles (3.2 km) upstream at altitude 830 feet (250 m)
    - a left branch 2.5 miles (4.0 km) upstream
    - a left branch 3 miles (4.8 km) upstream
    - a left drain 5.5 miles (8.9 km) upstream at altitude 985 feet (300 m)
  - Jacks Creek 12.25 miles (19.71 km) upstream at altitude 780 feet (240 m), mouth at 37°11′28″N 83°35′30″W headwaters at 37°12′28″N 83°32′05″W
    - Dave Bowling Branch (a.k.a. Spurlock Branch) 1.625 miles (2.615 km) upstream at altitude 910 feet (280 m), mouth at 37°12′24″N 83°34′03″W headwaters at 37°13′15″N 83°34′29″W
      - Right Fork 0.5 miles (0.80 km) upstream at altitude 1,065 feet (325 m), mouth at 37°12′46″N 83°34′09″W headwaters at 37°13′20″N 83°34′06″W
  - Copes Branch 14.5 miles (23.3 km) upstream at altitude 788 feet (240 m)
  - Big Creek 15 miles (24 km) upstream at altitude 789 feet (240 m), mouth at 37°10′00″N 83°34′56″W, whose further tributaries and locations are in its own article
  - Elk Creek 15.75 miles (25.35 km) upstream at altitude 794 feet (242 m), mouth at 37°09′17″N 83°35′17″W headwaters at 37°06′16″N 83°39′40″W
    - Town Branch 2.5 miles (4.0 km) upstream at altitude 925 feet (282 m), mouth at 37°07′34″N 83°37′50″W headwaters at 37°08′01″N 83°38′39″W
    - Left Fork 3.5 miles (5.6 km) upstream at altitude 990 feet (300 m), mouth at 37°07′02″N 83°38′26″W headwaters at 37°05′58″N 83°38′29″W
  - Little Double Creek 17.25 miles (27.76 km) upstream at altitude 804 feet (245 m), mouth at 37°08′24″N 83°35′31″W headwaters at 37°06′52″N 83°37′18″W
  - Big Double Creek 17.5 miles (28.2 km) upstream at altitude 805 feet (245 m), mouth at 37°08′25″N 83°35′15″W right and left forks at 37°05′26″N 83°36′09″W
    - Right Fork 1.75 miles (2.82 km) upstream at altitude 885 feet (270 m), headwaters at 37°05′40″N 83°38′08″W
    - Left Fork 1.75 miles (2.82 km) upstream at altitude 885 feet (270 m), headwaters at 37°04′30″N 83°37′00″W
      - upper forks 2.375 miles (3.822 km) upstream,
  - Sugar Creek 20.5 miles (33.0 km) upstream at altitude 824 feet (251 m), mouth at 37°07′05″N 83°33′34″W headwaters at 37°07′32″N 83°29′03″W
    - Bond Hollow 1.25 miles (2.01 km) upstream at altitude 875 feet (267 m),
    - Spruce Pine Branch 1.5 miles (2.4 km) upstream at altitude 925 feet (282 m),
    - Masters Branch 2.25 miles (3.62 km) upstream at altitude 990 feet (300 m),
    - Sulphur Spring Branch 2.72 miles (4.38 km) upstream at altitude 1,055 feet (322 m),
  - Gilbert Creek 22.5 miles (36.2 km) upstream at altitude 833 feet (254 m), mouth at 37°06′28″N 83°33′21″W headwaters at 37°05′49″N 83°27′52″W
    - Bowling Branch 4.5 miles (7.2 km) upstream at altitude 1,220 feet (370 m),
  - Little Creek 23.25 miles (37.42 km) upstream at altitude 840 feet (260 m), mouth at 37°05′59″N 83°33′29″W headwaters at 37°05′28″N 83°34′38″W
    - Right Fork 0.75 miles (1.21 km) upstream at altitude 950 feet (290 m),
    - Left Fork 0.75 miles (1.21 km) upstream at altitude 950 feet (290 m),
  - Elisha Creek 24.25 miles (39.03 km) upstream at altitude 851 feet (259 m), mouth at 37°05′16″N 83°32′48″W
    - Left Fork 1.25 miles (2.01 km) upstream at altitude 925 feet (282 m), mouth at 37°05′07″N 83°31′35″W headwaters at 37°05′25″N 83°28′15″W
    - Middle Fork 1.75 miles (2.82 km) upstream at altitude 985 feet (300 m), mouth at 37°04′54″N 83°31′05″W headwaters at 37°04′50″N 83°29′30″W
    - Right Fork 1.75 miles (2.82 km) upstream at altitude 985 feet (300 m), mouth at 37°04′54″N 83°31′05″W headwaters at 37°04′34″N 83°28′08″W
  - Flat Creek 25 miles (40 km) upstream at altitude 855 feet (261 m), 3.5 miles (5.6 km) long and which rises in the Sand Hills, mouth at 37°04′45″N 83°33′11″W headwaters at 37°03′47″N 83°36′57″W
    - Little Flat Creek 0.75 miles (1.21 km) upstream at altitude 870 feet (270 m), mouth at 37°04′33″N 83°33′30″W headwaters at 37°04′26″N 83°36′16″W
    - Panther Branch 3.25 miles (5.23 km) upstream at altitude 1,160 feet (350 m), mouth at 37°03′35″N 83°36′06″W headwaters at 37°02′27″N 83°36′37″W
    - Left Fork 4 miles (6.4 km) upstream at altitude 1,235 feet (376 m), mouth at 37°03′43″N 83°36′28″W headwaters at 37°04′13″N 83°36′40″W
  - Bowen Creek 26.5 miles (42.6 km) upstream at altitude 870 feet (270 m), mouth at 37°04′03″N 83°32′18″W headwaters at 37°02′15″N 83°26′49″W
    - Daniel Branch 2.25 miles (3.62 km) upstream at altitude 1,030 feet (310 m), mouth at 37°02′58″N 83°30′44″W headwaters at 37°02′33″N 83°30′37″W
    - Brushy Fork 6 miles (9.7 km) upstream at altitude 1,265 feet (386 m), mouth at 37°02′22″N 83°28′02″W headwaters at 37°03′09″N 83°27′20″W
  - Spring Creek, 6 miles (9.7 km) long and rising in the Sand Hills east of the Brightshade post office on Goose Creek, mouth at 37°03′43″N 83°32′29″W headwaters at 37°01′53″N 83°35′48″W
    - Cane Knob Branch 4 miles (6.4 km) upstream at altitude 1,210 feet (370 m),
    - Right Fork 4.75 miles (7.64 km) upstream at altitude 1,260 feet (380 m), headwaters at 37°02′08″N 83°36′28″W
    - Left Fork 4.75 miles (7.64 km) upstream at altitude 1,260 feet (380 m), headwaters at 37°01′41″N 83°36′25″W
  - Rich Branch 28.75 miles (46.27 km) upstream at altitude 900 feet (270 m), mouth at 37°02′31″N 83°32′48″W headwaters at 37°02′10″N 83°33′23″W
  - Katy's Creek 29.5 miles (47.5 km) upstream at altitude 911 feet (278 m), mouth at 37°02′06″N 83°32′24″W headwaters at 37°00′58″N 83°35′36″W
    - Left Fork 2 miles (3.2 km) upstream at altitude 1,075 feet (328 m),
  - Jacks Creek 30.75 miles (49.49 km) upstream at altitude 925 feet (282 m), mouth at 37°01′33″N 83°31′40″W upper forks at 37°00′47″N 83°29′50″W
    - Old-House Branch 0.5 miles (0.80 km) upstream at altitude 965 feet (294 m), mouth at 37°01′29″N 83°31′10″W headwaters at 37°01′53″N 83°30′11″W
    - Left Fork 2.25 miles (3.62 km) upstream at altitude 1,085 feet (331 m), headwaters at 37°01′06″N 83°28′08″W
      - Oakley Cave Branch 0.25 miles (0.40 km) upstream at altitude 1,115 feet (340 m), mouth at 37°00′49″N 83°29′38″W headwaters at 37°00′48″N 83°28′37″W
    - Right Fork 2.25 miles (3.62 km) upstream at altitude 1,085 feet (331 m), headwaters at 36°59′47″N 83°28′33″W
      - Jesse Fork 0.75 miles (1.21 km) upstream at altitude 1,160 feet (350 m), mouth at 37°00′18″N 83°29′47″W headwaters at 36°59′09″N 83°29′19″W
  - Bear Creek 31.75 miles (51.10 km) upstream at altitude 935 feet (285 m), mouth at 37°01′15″N 83°32′03″W upper forks at 37°00′14″N 83°34′21″W
  - Whitehead Branch 31.75 miles (51.10 km) upstream at altitude 942 feet (287 m),
  - Phillips Fork 34.75 miles (55.92 km) upstream at altitude 958 feet (292 m), 7.16 miles (11.52 km) long with a gradient of 120.53 feet per mile (22.828 m/km); mouth just south of Queendale at 37°00′18″N 83°31′38″W headwaters at 36°54′50″N 83°29′11″W. Flowing generally north-east, it varies in width between 6 feet (1.8 m) to 18 feet (5.5 m).
    - Saw-Pit Branch (a.k.a. Steel Trap Branch) 0.75 miles (1.21 km) upstream at altitude 1,010 feet (310 m),
    - Pups Branch 1.75 miles (2.82 km) upstream at altitude 1,090 feet (330 m), mouth at 36°58′42″N 83°31′07″W headwaters at 36°58′35″N 83°29′29″W
    - East Hilton Branch 4.25 miles (6.84 km) upstream at altitude 1,440 feet (440 m),
    - Sandy Fork 1 mile (1.6 km) long
  - Blue-Hole Branch 33.75 miles (54.32 km) upstream at altitude 991 feet (302 m),
    - Bear Wallow 1.5 miles (2.4 km) upstream,
    - the forks 1.75 miles (2.82 km) upstream,
  - Lick Fork 36 miles (58 km) upstream at altitude 1,064 feet (324 m), mouth at 36°58′08″N 83°32′18″W headwaters at 36°57′15″N 83°35′12″W
    - the forks 1.5 miles (2.4 km) upstream,
  - Rich Branch 38.25 miles (61.56 km) upstream at altitude 1,192 feet (363 m), mouth at 36°56′36″N 83°31′53″W headwaters at 36°56′15″N 83°30′55″W
  - Meadow Fork 38.5 miles (62.0 km) upstream at altitude 1,208 feet (368 m),
  - Cow Fork 38.75 miles (62.36 km) upstream at altitude 1,240 feet (380 m), mouth at 36°55′46″N 83°32′00″W headwaters at 36°54′58″N 83°29′35″W

The two Bear Creek tributaries are sometimes distinguished as Lower Bear Creek and Upper Bear Creek. The two Jack's Creek tributaries are likewise sometimes distinguished as Lower Jack's Creek and Upper Jack's Creek. Similarly, on some modern maps a distinction is drawn between Red Bird Creek, which is the reach upstream of the confluence with Phillips Fork, and Red Bird River, which is the reach downstream; although the KGS Fourth Report in 1918 made no such distinction and simply named whole thing Redbird Creek.

The meeting point of Clay, Bell, and Leslie counties is just east of Sandy Fork.

=== Hector Creek, Jack's Creek, the Red Bird post offices, Beverly, Nuckles, and the Red Bird school ===
Red Bird was the name of a Native American who was murdered near the river, according to a 19th-century tale that traces back at least to an early settler and preacher named John Gilbert. The story goes that a Chief Red Bird with his housekeeper Jack were murdered just upstream of the creek mouth of Hector Creek, at the former site of the Red Bird River Petroglyphs. Jack's Creek (the Lower one) is named after the Jack in the tale. Gilbert, or his son Abijah, is also credited in a similar story with coining the name of Hector Creek, naming it after his hunting dog that was killed by a bear on its banks.

Local schoolteacher and minister John Jay Dickey recorded the Gilberts's tales in his diary in the 1890s. Chief Red Bird and Jack are not recorded in any history books at all from the early 19th century, only being recorded by Dickey as aforementioned and by Richard Collins (revising his father Lewis's earlier work) in the 1870s; however there were two Red Bird post offices and several other things named after (at least) the river and the two creeks.

The first Red Bird post office is largely a mystery. It is known to have operated from 1828 to 1831, but its location and postmaster are unknown, and its location only narrowed down as far as being either on Red Bird Creek next to the mouth of Big Creek or somewhere on Big Creek.

The second Red Bird post office in Bell County was established on 1876-10-24 by postmaster Richard Wilkerson Asher. It was located at the mouth of Cow Creek and remained there as it passed through the hands of successive family members. When R. W. Asher died in 1884 it passed to his daughter Amanda "Mandy" Jane, who married one William R. "Bill" Knuckles. She attempted to rename the post office Knuckles, but she misspelled it as Nuckles on the USPS forms. She in turn died in 1890, the postmastership passing to her husband, who in his turn died in 1910 with their son John Beverly Knuckles taking over the postmastership. The USPS requested a change of name in August 1911, and the post office finally became Beverly. John was replaced by his wife Myrtle as postmaster on 1913-12-22.

In the latter part of the 20th century the Beverly post office moved to the mouth of the Lawson Branch of Lawson Creek, some 2.5 miles (4.0 km) away. It is still open as of the 21st century.

R. W. Asher was a storekeeper and a preacher, and in his time the post office served a small area with a corn mill, a school, and a church. Bill Knuckles was also a storekeeper, and also a lawyer. John Beverly Knuckles and Millard F. Knuckles were landowners, who in 1921 offered their land to build a school and hospital.

This was to become the Red Bird Mission and Settlement School, built by the Women's Missionary Society of the Evangelical Church of Pennsylvania. It has operated a sales outlet for local craftspeople, a community store, several schools, fifteen churches across five counties, a hospital, and a clinic.

The Jacks Creek post office was established on 1932-02-26 by postmaster Marion Hensley. It closed in June 1954.

The Burns post office was established on 1892-06-20 by postmaster Harriet Burns. She had wanted the names Burns Store, Hector, or Hayes (after a local family). It was located 5 miles (8.0 km) upstream on Hector Creek, and closed in August 1893.

The Hector post office was established on 1900-12-28 by postmaster Arazona Davidson. It was originally 3.5 miles (5.6 km) upstream on Hector Creek, but was moved in 1924 by postmaster Jane L. Chadwell to the mouth of a left branch of Hector now known as Davidson Branch and earlier known as Jim Hubbard's Branch, close to where Burns had been years before. It closed in 1977.

A gap named Hector Gap connects the headwaters of Hector Creek to the Lockhart Creek tributary of Goose Creek. Kentucky Route 149 crosses that gap and follows Hector Creek for the whole of its course, the Daniel Boone Parkway also following the creek for most of it.

=== Eriline ===
The Eriline post office was established on 1902-12-09 and lasted until 1988, with a 32-year hiatus from 1911. It was supposed to be named after Eveline (some sources spell as Evaline) Britton (1861–1939), wife of Van Britton (1855–1911) its first postmaster, but the clerks at the USPS could not read the handwriting on the application form, naming it Eriline instead, and the Brittons did not consider it important enough to make a fuss about the name.

It was originally established at the Brittons's home at the mouth of Hector Creek, but moved three times. The first move was to the east side of the Red Bird River, south of the mouth of Big Creek, which was the result of its reëstablishment after the hiatus on 1943-08-29 by George C. Hensley. The second move was back north in 1944 by Mary W. Bowling to the west of the Red Bird, 2.5 miles (4.0 km) from the then Jacks Creek post office. The third move took it upriver in 1949, and at its closure in 1988 it was still on the west side of the Red Bird, at the junction of Kentucky Route 66 and Jacks Creek Road.

=== Spring Creek ===
The Spring Creek post office was established on 1876-07-10 by postmaster Jesse Mattingly. It was located at several sites on Spring Creek at or just upstream of the creek mouth. After closing on 1884-05-08 it was reëstablished at the mouth of Flat Creek by on 1885-01-16 by postmaster Christopher Bowling. After later moving back to Spring Creek, it closed in October 1944.

=== Marcum ===
The Marcum post office was established on 1908-03-11 by postmaster Henry B. Marcum Jr. It was named after his family, descendants of Henry's grandfather Thomas Marcum who was an early settler on Red Bird some time around 1812. It was originally located just below and across from the mouth of Sugar Creek. Some time before 1928 it moved upstream by 1 mile (1.6 km) to across from the mouth of Gilbert Creek. It closed in June 1984.

=== Antepast ===
The Antepast post office was established on 1910-01-20 by postmaster Wilson T. Martin. It was originally located on Red Bird 1.5 miles (2.4 km) downstream of the mouth of (Lower) Beaar Creek, and moved 2 miles (3.2 km) further downstream in November 1932 under postmaster Howell T. Bowling. It was here, some 2.5 miles (4.0 km) upstream of Oneida, that it closed in November 1936.

There are several competing hypotheses recorded for the origin of its name. Clay County historian Jess D. Wilson, in his book When They Hanged The Fiddler, gives the most directly sourced: a story from his own family lore about the local preacher waiting for "Andy's passing" in the middle of church services, as Wilson's great-grandfather Andy Baker would drunkenly and noisily pass by. Another account, supported by George R. Stewart's American Given Names dictionary, states that it was after some person whose name in turn was taken from Biblical figure Herod Antipas, no such person being recorded in the area, however. The third, and least likely, account, from George R. Stewart's American Place Names dictionary, is that it was named after antepasti.

=== Gardner serving Bringardner ===
The Gardner post office was established on 1931-05-31 and run by postmaster Ray Kevil Carter until August 1940. It served the Gardner Station on the railroad for the Bringardner Lumber Company, owned by Fred Bringardner of Lexington. The post office was at the mouth of Lick Fork.

The Bringardner Lumber Company's railway operated out of what was at the time known as Asher's Fork, further upstream towards the Beverly post office. Charles Bringardner, Fred's son, sales manager, and a later president of Bringardner Lumber, also later operated the Red Bird Lumber Company near to Marcum post office. Charles was commissioned as a junior lieutenant in the United States Naval Reserve in World War 2, with M. R. McCorckle of McCorckle Lumber running Bringardner Lumber whilst he was away.

=== Flat Creek and Creekville and Van Camp post offices ===
The Flat Creek post office was established on 1857-08-15 by postmaster Felix G. Gilbert. It is not known exactly where it was located and it closed on 1861-09-06.

The Van Camp post office was established on 1924-09-29 by postmaster Jable L. Stewart. It was located 1.5 miles (2.4 km) upstream on Flat Creek at the mouth of its Rocky Fork. Stewart's first choice of name had been Sand Hills after the creek's headwaters, but this was rejected by the USPS. It closed in September 1938.

The Creekville post office was established on 1928-09-01 by postmaster Bascom C. Bowling, one-time postmaster of the Annalee post office that was to become Peabody. Bowling's first choice of name had been Flat Creek. It was located at the Flat Creek mouth on Red Bird, and closed in 1972.

=== Skidmore and Sandy Fork ===
The Skidmore post office was established on 1876-08-03 by postmaster J. D. Asher. It was named after his successor Andrew C. Skidmore who took over from Asher on 1876-10-27. It was in the store of Joasiah Asher, J. D. Asher being a local miller, at the mouth of Phillips Fork. Postmaster James F. Asher moved it upstream to just 50 yards (46 m) away from the county line in 1902. It closed in June 1913.

The Sandy Fork post office was established on 1877-02-26 by postmaster J. R. Fairchild. It was located at the mouth of the same-named Sandy Fork, and changed name to Sandyfork in March 1894. It closed on 1911-09-30.

=== Roark ===
The Roark post office was established on 1907-01-29 by postmasters John A. and Lucy F. Roark. Located 0.5 miles (0.80 km) upstream on (Upper) Jack's Creek it has been operated by members of the Roark family, all descendants of early John Coke Roark from Roanoke, Virginia. It is still there today.

== Asher family ==
A family named Asher settled in the Upper Red Bird Creek area in the 19th century, descendents of early settler and local landowner in the Goose Creek and Red Bird valleys, Dillion Asher (1774–1844), who back in 1800 had lived in a minor tributary hollow just downstream of the Phillip's Fork. He may or may not have been the first tollgate keeper at Cumberland Ford, the Asher family history saying that he was but Robert L. Kincaid in The Wilderness Road saying that it was rather one Robert Craig. He definitely had a lean-to at the ford in 1797, but he moved to Upper Red Bird shortly afterwards. He had passed through he area earlier in 1777, planting some peach seeds along the way, and he came back to see how they had fared. He built a log home there in 1799, which still stands on the grounds of the Red Bird River Community Hospital of the United Brethren Church.

The Asher Fork post office and tributary of Goose Creek are named for the family. As is the Asher post office on the Beech Fork of Middle Fork Kentucky River to the west.

The family included the aforementioned Richard Wilkerson Asher, J. D. Asher, Josiah Asher, and James F. Asher. Other Ashers were Matilda Asher, who lived on Saw-Pit Branch, a Mrs Asher (forename unrecorded) who had a mine 1.375 miles (2.213 km) upstream on Phillips Fork, and A. J. Asher who had a mine on Lick Fork.

== See also ==
- List of rivers of Kentucky

== Sources ==
- Hodge, James Michael (1918). The coals of Goose Creek and its tributaries. Reports of the Kentucky Geological Survey 4th series 1912–1918. Vol. 4. Frankfort, Kentucky: The State Journal Company. (The coals of Goose Creek and its tributaries at the Internet Archive)
- Rennick, Robert M. (2000). Leslie County — Post Offices. County Histories of Kentucky. Vol. 241. Morehead State University.
- Rennick, Robert M. (2000). Bell County — Post Offices. County Histories of Kentucky. Vol. 383. Morehead State University.
- Rennick, Robert M. (2000). Clay County — Post Offices. County Histories of Kentucky. Vol. 176. Morehead State University.
- Rennick, Robert M. (2016). Clay County — Place Names. Robert M. Rennick Manuscript Collection. Vol. 53. Morehead State University.
- Collins, Lewis; Collins, Richard H. (1877). "Clay County". History of Kentucky (republished ed.). Louisville, Kentucky: Richard H. Collins. ISBN 9780722249208.
- Cornett, Tim (2009). Bell County, Kentucky: A Brief History. Arcadia Publishing. ISBN 9781625843227.
- Coy Jr, Fred E.; Fuller, Thomas C.; Meadows, Larry G.; Swauger, James F. (2014). Rock Art Of Kentucky. Perspectives on Kentucky's past. University Press of Kentucky. ISBN 9780813158389.
- United States Environmental Protection Agency. "Watershed Report: Red Bird River". WATERS GeoViewer. Archived from the original on December 25, 2021.
- Maccracken, Jim (2017). Leslie County Kentucky Fishing & Floating Guide Book. Kentucky Fishing & Floating Guide Books. Lancaster, Ohio: Recreational Guides.
- Sehlinger, Bob; Molloy, Johnny (2011). "Red Bird River". A Canoeing and Kayaking Guide to Kentucky. Menasha Ridge Press. ISBN 9780897328265.
- Hay, Melba Porter; Wells, Dianne; Appleton Jr, Thomas H., eds. (2002). Roadside History: A Guide to Kentucky Highway Markers. University Press of Kentucky. ISBN 9780916968298.
- "Reverend John Jay Dickey papers". Special Collections Research Center. University of Kentucky. 1997ms510.
- Koch, Michael (1979). Steam & Thunder in the Timber: Saga of the Forest Railroads. World Press.
- American Lumberman. 1940.
- American Lumberman. 1943.
- Handbook and Directory of the Forest Industries. Vol. 41. Miller Freeman Publications. 1959.
- Wilson, Jess D. (1985). When They Hanged The Fiddler and Other Stories from "It Happened Here". Berea, Kentucky: Kentucky Imprints. ISBN 9780935680171. OCLC 42710044. (When They Hanged The Fiddler and Other Stories from "It Happened Here" at the Internet Archive)
