= Manchester, Kentucky =

- City
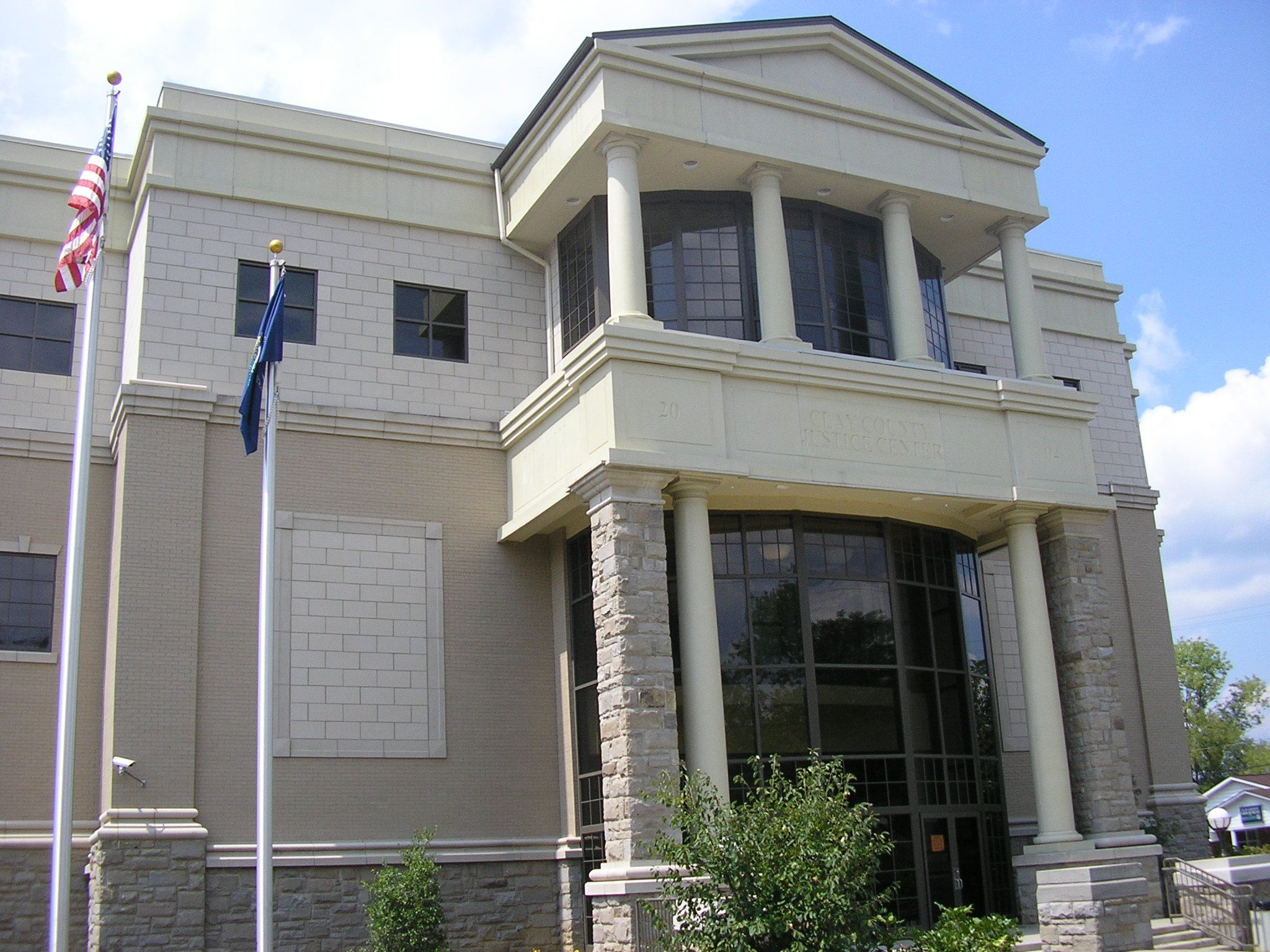
- Clay County Courthouse in Manchester, Kentucky
- Motto: The City of Hope
- Location of Manchester in Clay County, Kentucky.
- Coordinates: 37°9′10″N 83°45′48″W
- Country: United States
- State: Kentucky
- County: Clay
- Incorporated: February 6, 1844
- Named for: the English industrial town

Government
  - Type: Mayor-Council
  - Mayor: Steve Collins

Area
  - Total: 2.95 sq mi (7.65 km^{2})
  - Land: 2.93 sq mi (7.58 km^{2})
  - Water: 0.027 sq mi (0.07 km^{2})
- Elevation: 869 ft (265 m)

Population (2020)
  - Total: 1,512
  - Estimate (2022): 2,158
  - Density: 516.5/sq mi (199.44/km^{2})
- Time zone: UTC-5 (Eastern (EST))
  - Summer (DST): UTC-4 (EDT)
- ZIP code: 40962
- Area code: 606
- FIPS code: 21-49656
- GNIS feature ID: 0513768
- Website: cityofmanchesterky.org

Manchester is a home rule-class city in Clay County, Kentucky, in the United States. Manchester is part of the Corbin KY Micropolitan statistical area, as is the entirety of Clay County, and is the seat of its county and the home of a minimum- and medium-security federal prison. As of the 2020 census, Manchester had a population of 1,512.

== History ==
The town was founded to be the seat of the newly formed Clay County in 1807 on a 10-acre (4.0 ha) parcel near the Lower Goose Creek Salt Works. The county court stipulated that the town be named Greenville in honor of the War of 1812 general who gave the county its name. The Greenville in Muhlenberg County had already preempted that name, however, and it was changed to "Manchester" in December. There was a local legend in the town that this was in honor of the hometown of Gen. Garrard's second wife Lucy Lees, but a prominent local family, the Hollingsworth, were originally from Manchester, England. Rennick points out that Lees was born well after the naming of the city. He opines that it is more likely that the local businessmen simply wanted a name evocative of the English industrial success.

== Geography ==
Manchester is located at 37°9′10″N 83°45′48″W (37.152818, -83.763403). According to the United States Census Bureau, the city has a total area of 1.5 square miles (3.9 km^{2}), all land.

== Demographics ==
Historical population
Census	Pop.	Note	%±
1880	97		—
1900	398		—
1910	626		57.3%
1940	1,509		—
1950	1,706		13.1%
1960	1,868		9.5%
1970	1,664		−10.9%
1980	1,838		10.5%
1990	1,634		−11.1%
2000	1,738		6.4%
2010	1,255		−27.8%
2020	1,512		20.5%
2022 (est.)	1,459		−3.5%
U.S. Decennial Census

=== 2020 census ===
As of the 2020 census, Manchester had a population of 1,512. The median age was 42.1 years. 22.4% of residents were under the age of 18 and 19.8% of residents were 65 years of age or older. For every 100 females there were 82.8 males, and for every 100 females age 18 and over there were 79.4 males age 18 and over.

0.0% of residents lived in urban areas, while 100.0% lived in rural areas.

There were 681 households in Manchester, of which 32.6% had children under the age of 18 living in them. Of all households, 32.5% were married-couple households, 19.8% were households with a male householder and no spouse or partner present, and 41.4% were households with a female householder and no spouse or partner present. About 36.4% of all households were made up of individuals and 16.1% had someone living alone who was 65 years of age or older.

There were 752 housing units, of which 9.4% were vacant. The homeowner vacancy rate was 2.2% and the rental vacancy rate was 6.7%.

Racial composition as of the 2020 census
Race	Number	Percent
White	1,347	89.1%
Black or African American	99	6.5%
American Indian and Alaska Native	0	0.0%
Asian	4	0.3%
Native Hawaiian and Other Pacific Islander	2	0.1%
Some other race	9	0.6%
Two or more races	51	3.4%
Hispanic or Latino (of any race)	33	2.2%

=== 2010 census ===
As of the 2010 census, there were 1,255 people, 579 households, and 332 families living in the city. The population density was 836.7 inhabitants per square mile (323.1/km^{2}). There were 655 housing units at an average density of 436.7 per square mile (168.6/km^{2}). The racial makeup of the city was 92.5% White, 6.3% African American, 0% Native American, 0.1% Asian, 0.2% from other races, and 0.1% from two or more races. Hispanic or Latino of any race were 1% of the population.

There were 579 households, out of which 23.3% had children under the age of 18 living with them, 33.5% were married couples living together, 19% had a female householder with no husband present, and 42.7% were non-families. 37.8% of all households were made up of individuals, and 19.2% had someone living alone who was 65 years of age or older. The average household size was 2.16 and the average family size was 2.84.

== Education ==
Manchester has a lending library, the Clay County Public Library.

== Media ==
Manchester is the city of license cited by five radio stations:

- WWXL
- WKLB
- WTBK
- WWLT
- WWZB-LP

== Notable people ==
- Bert T. Combs, governor of Kentucky and United States circuit judge
- Richie Farmer, University of Kentucky shooting guard and Kentucky Commissioner of Agriculture
- Theophilus T. Garrard, Union Army brigadier general during the Civil War
- John D. White, U.S. representative from Kentucky
