= Robinson Creek =

Robinson Creek may refer to:

- Robinson Creek (Shelby Creek), a stream in Kentucky
- Robinson Creek, Kentucky, an unincorporated community
- Robinson Creek (Lake Ontario), a stream in Durham County, Ontario

== See also ==
- Robinson Branch (disambiguation)
