= Reuben May =

American farmer and politician from Wisconsin (1815–1902)

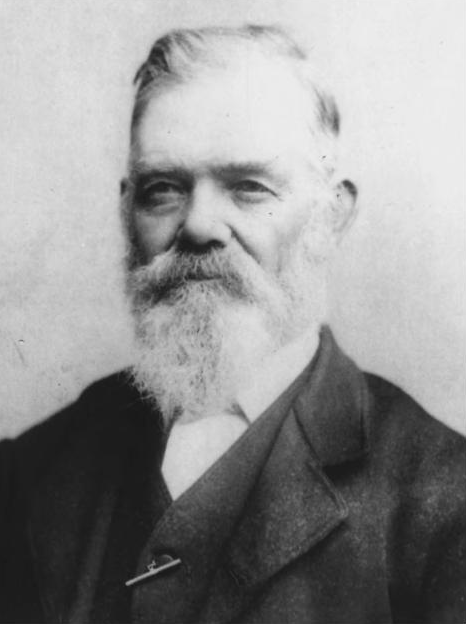

Member of the Wisconsin State Assembly from the Vernon 1st district
- In office January 1, 1872 – January 1, 1873
- Preceded by: Joseph W. Hoyt
- Succeeded by: Peter Jerman
- In office January 1, 1870 – January 1, 1871
- Preceded by: John M. McLees
- Succeeded by: Joseph W. Hoyt

Personal details
- Born: Reuben May; June 23, 1815 Robinson Creek, Kentucky
- Died: September 26, 1902 (aged 87) Vernon County, Wisconsin
- Resting place: Springville Cemetery; Springville, Wisconsin
- Party: Populist (1892–1896); Union Labor (1890); Greenback (1877–1880); Republican (1864–1875); Constitutional Union (1860); Democratic (before 1860)
- Spouses: Emmeriah V. A. Honaker (m. 1835; died 1881); Phoebe Ann Dolliver (m. 1882; died 1883); Caroline S. Johnson (Bennett) (m. 1884–1902)
- Children: Julia Ann May^{(b. 1836; died 1865)}; Louisa Jane May^{(b. 1838; died 1892)}; Mary Dorcas May^{(b. 1840; died 1915)}; William James May^{(b. 1842; died 1921)}; Thomas Henry May^{(b. 1843; died 1920)}; Zwingelieus S. May^{(b. 1846; died 1923)}; Belle Virginia A. May^{(b. 1849; died 1875)}; Robert Daniel May^{(b. 1851; died 1942)}; Alonzo Franklin May^{(b. 1853; died 1943)}; Albert Bascom May^{(b. 1855; died 1902)}; Richard Apperson May^{(b. 1857; died 1883)}; Hugh Lawson May^{(b. 1859; died 1958)}; Georgia E. May^{(b. 1861; died 1865)}

Military service
- Allegiance: United States
- Branch/service: Kentucky Militia; United States Volunteers; Union Army
- Years of service: 1840s (KY); 1861–1864 (USV)
- Rank: Colonel, USV
- Commands: 7th Reg. Ky. Vol. Infantry; 8th Reg. Ky. Vol. Infantry
- Battles/wars: Mexican–American War; American Civil War: Battle of Perryville; Stones River Campaign; Battle of Stones River; Vicksburg campaign; Battle of Champion Hill; Battle of Big Black River Bridge; Siege of Vicksburg; Jackson Expedition

Reuben May (June 23, 1815 – September 26, 1902) was an American farmer and populist politician. He was a member of the Wisconsin State Assembly, representing the western half of Vernon County during the 1870 and 1872 sessions. He was also twice a candidate for governor of Wisconsin, running on the Greenback ticket in 1879 and the Union Labor ticket in 1890. Earlier in life, he served as a colonel in the Union Army during the American Civil War.

== Early life ==
Reuben May was born in Robinson Creek, in Pike County, Kentucky, the son of a wealthy and well-established family. He grew up on his father's estate, and served as an officer in the Kentucky Militia, rising to the rank of lieutenant colonel during the Mexican–American War.

He became involved in politics with the Democratic Party and was appointed postmaster at Pikeville, Kentucky, and, after moving to Clay County, Kentucky, in 1849, he was appointed postmaster at Mount Welcome. While living in Clay County, he was involved in salt production and managed a 400-acre farm. He was a candidate for the Kentucky Senate in 1853, but was defeated.

== Civil War service ==
At the outbreak of the American Civil War, May was living in Clay County. Kentucky, as a border state, sought a path of neutrality between the Union and Confederacy. The population, however, split between the two factions. Most of May's family sided with the Confederacy.

May, however, chose to join up with the Union Army. He teamed with Sidney M. Barnes, a lawyer and wealthy landowner in Estill County, Kentucky. They organized a regiment on Barnes' estate, bringing in willing men and collecting rifles from known Confederate sympathizers in the surrounding communities. When they had enough armed men, their unit mustered into federal service as the 8th Kentucky Infantry Regiment in the Fall of 1861. Barnes and May were, respectively, appointed colonel and lieutenant colonel.

In the early months in federal service, the regiment was stationed in Union strongholds in central Tennessee. During these months, May worked to educate the officers of the regiment in principles and tactics, and generally served as drillmaster for the enlisted men. May distinguished himself at the Battle of Perryville, leading a small detachment which captured a number of Confederate prisoners.

Colonel Barnes left the regiment on a leave of absence during December 1862, and May commanded the regiment through the Battle of Stones River. The regiment's officer corps was also severely diminished by disease that winter. The regiment saw intense fighting at Stones River, near the center of the Union line. As units on their left and right fled, they held their ground until surrounded on three sides. Nearly every remaining officer in the regiment was either wounded or killed. May was hit by shrapnel, suffered a concussion, and had his horse shot out from under him.

After the battle, the regiment was camped at Murfreesboro for the next several months and May recuperated from his injuries at Nashville until April. During that time, May was promoted to colonel and placed in command of the 7th Kentucky Infantry Regiment. With this command, May participated in many of the important battles of the Vicksburg campaign. He mustered out at the end of his three-year enlistment in October 1864.

== Political career ==
While the war had raged in Tennessee and Kentucky, the homes of many Union loyalists had been raided and May's wife and children had fled the state to Wisconsin in 1863. With May's blessing, they purchased a large farm in the town of Jefferson, Vernon County, Wisconsin. May joined them there after leaving the Army. Politically, May had been a Democrat before the war, and voted for John Bell in the 1860 United States presidential election. He voted for Abraham Lincoln's re-election in 1864, but was never comfortable in the Republican Party. In 1869, he was elected to his first term in the Wisconsin State Assembly, running on the Republican ticket. He was not renominated by the party in 1870, but ran unsuccessfully as an independent candidate. In 1871, he was again nominated by the Republicans and won another term in the Assembly. His district in these years was Vernon County's 1st Assembly district, which then comprised roughly the west half of the county.

He next ran for office in 1875, running for Wisconsin State Senate in the 4th State Senate district—then comprising Vernon and Monroe counties. May ran as an independent, the only opponent against Republican nominee J. Henry Tate. May received the majority of votes from Vernon County, but lost the overall election by just 6 votes. Because the election was so close, May pressed a challenge in the Senate elections committee, but the committee ultimately ruled against him.

In the late 1870s, he became one of the most active proponents of the Greenback Party movement in Wisconsin. He was the Greenback nominee for governor of Wisconsin in the 1879 Wisconsin gubernatorial election. He ran a vigorous campaign, but received less than 7% of the statewide vote.

May largely concentrated on his farm estate for the next decade, was described as one of the state's richest farmers, with one of the most beautiful farms in the state. He was also a leader in the state farmer's alliance.

He was induced to make one final run for office. He was nominated by the Union Labor Party for governor of Wisconsin in the 1890 election. The chief issue in the election was the Bennett Education Law, which was designed to set compulsory education standards, but had inflamed the immigrant population with English language requirements. The Labor Party was generally supportive of the law, but had other fundamental differences with the Republicans. May came in a distant fourth in the general election, receiving less than 2% of the vote. The Union Labor Party—in this incarnation—ceased to exist shortly after. May, like many others from the Labor Party, joined the new Populist Party, and was considered as a candidate for governor again 1894.

May died at his estate in Vernon County, on September 26, 1902, after an illness of about two months.

== Personal life and family ==
May was one of twelve children born to Thomas Phillips May and his wife Dorcas (née Patton). Most of May's family supported the Confederacy in the Civil War. His first cousin, Andrew Jackson May, served as a colonel in the Confederate Army.

Reuben May married Emmeriah V. A. Honaker in 1835. They had at least thirteen children together, though one died in infancy and two others died young. He was married to Emmeriah for 46 years before her death in 1881. After the death of his first wife, he married two more times. He married Phoebe Ann Dolliver in 1882, but she died less than a year later. He then married Caroline S. Bennett (née Johnson), the widow of Cyrus Crawford Bennett, who survived him.

== Electoral history ==
=== Wisconsin Assembly (1869, 1870, 1871) ===
Wisconsin Assembly, Vernon 1st District Election, 1869
Party	Candidate	Votes	%	±%
General Election, November 2, 1869
Republican	Reuben May	601	88.64%	
Democratic	D. A. Steele	77	11.36%	
Plurality		524	77.29%	
Total votes		678	100.0%	
Republican hold				

Wisconsin Assembly, Vernon 1st District Election, 1870
Party	Candidate	Votes	%	±%
General Election, November 8, 1870
Republican	Joseph W. Hoyt	365	42.29%	
Independent Republican	Reuben May (incumbent)	325	37.66%	
Democratic	John T. Brinkermann	173	20.05%	+8.69%
Plurality		40	4.63%	-72.65%
Total votes		863	100.0%	+27.29%
Republican hold				

Wisconsin Assembly, Vernon 1st District Election, 1871
Party	Candidate	Votes	%	±%
General Election, November 7, 1871
Republican	Reuben May	592	53.19%	
Independent	C. C. Oleson	521	46.81%	
Plurality		71	6.38%	+1.74%
Total votes		1,113	100.0%	+28.97%
Republican hold				

=== Wisconsin Senate (1875) ===
Wisconsin Senate, 4th District Election, 1875
Party	Candidate	Votes	%	±%
General Election, November 2, 1875
Republican	J. Henry Tate	2,577	50.06%	
Independent	Reuben May	2,571	49.94%	
Plurality		6	0.12%	
Total votes		5,148	100.0%	+20.20%
Republican hold				

=== Wisconsin Governor (1879, 1890) ===
Wisconsin Gubernatorial Election, 1879
Party	Candidate	Votes	%	±%
General Election, November 4, 1879
Republican	William E. Smith (incumbent)	100,535	53.19%	+8.98%
Democratic	James Graham Jenkins	75,030	39.70%	+0.13%
Greenback	Reuben May	12,996	6.88%	−7.84%
	Scattering	444	0.23%	
Plurality		25,505	13.49%	+8.85%
Total votes		189,005	100.0%	+6.11%
Republican hold				

Wisconsin Gubernatorial Election, 1890
Party	Candidate	Votes	%	±%
General Election, November 4, 1890
Democratic	George Wilbur Peck	160,388	51.86%	+8.05%
Republican	William D. Hoard (incumbent)	132,068	42.71%	−6.83%
Prohibition	Charles Alexander	11,246	3.64%	−0.42%
Labor	Reuben May	5,447	1.76%	−0.83%
	Scattering	105	0.03%	
Plurality		28,320	9.16%	+3.44%
Total votes		309,254	100.0%	-12.82%
Democratic gain from Republican				

Party political offices
Preceded by Edward P. Allis	Greenback nominee for Governor of Wisconsin; 1879	Succeeded by Edward P. Allis
Preceded by David Frank Powell	Union Labor nominee for Governor of Wisconsin; 1890	Party defunct
Military offices
Preceded by Col. Sidney M. Barnes	Command of the 8th Kentucky Infantry Regiment; December 7, 1862 – January 18, 1863	Succeeded by Col. Sidney M. Barnes
Preceded by Col. Theophilus T. Garrard	Command of the 7th Kentucky Infantry Regiment; May 1863 – October 1864	Succeeded by Col. George W. Monroe
Wisconsin State Assembly
Preceded by John M. McLees	Member of the Wisconsin State Assembly from the Vernon 1st district January 1, 1870 – January 1, 1871	Succeeded by Joseph W. Hoyt
Preceded by Joseph W. Hoyt	Member of the Wisconsin State Assembly from the Vernon 1st district January 1, 1872 – January 1, 1873	Succeeded by Peter Jerman
