= 1890 Wisconsin gubernatorial election =

- November 4, 1890
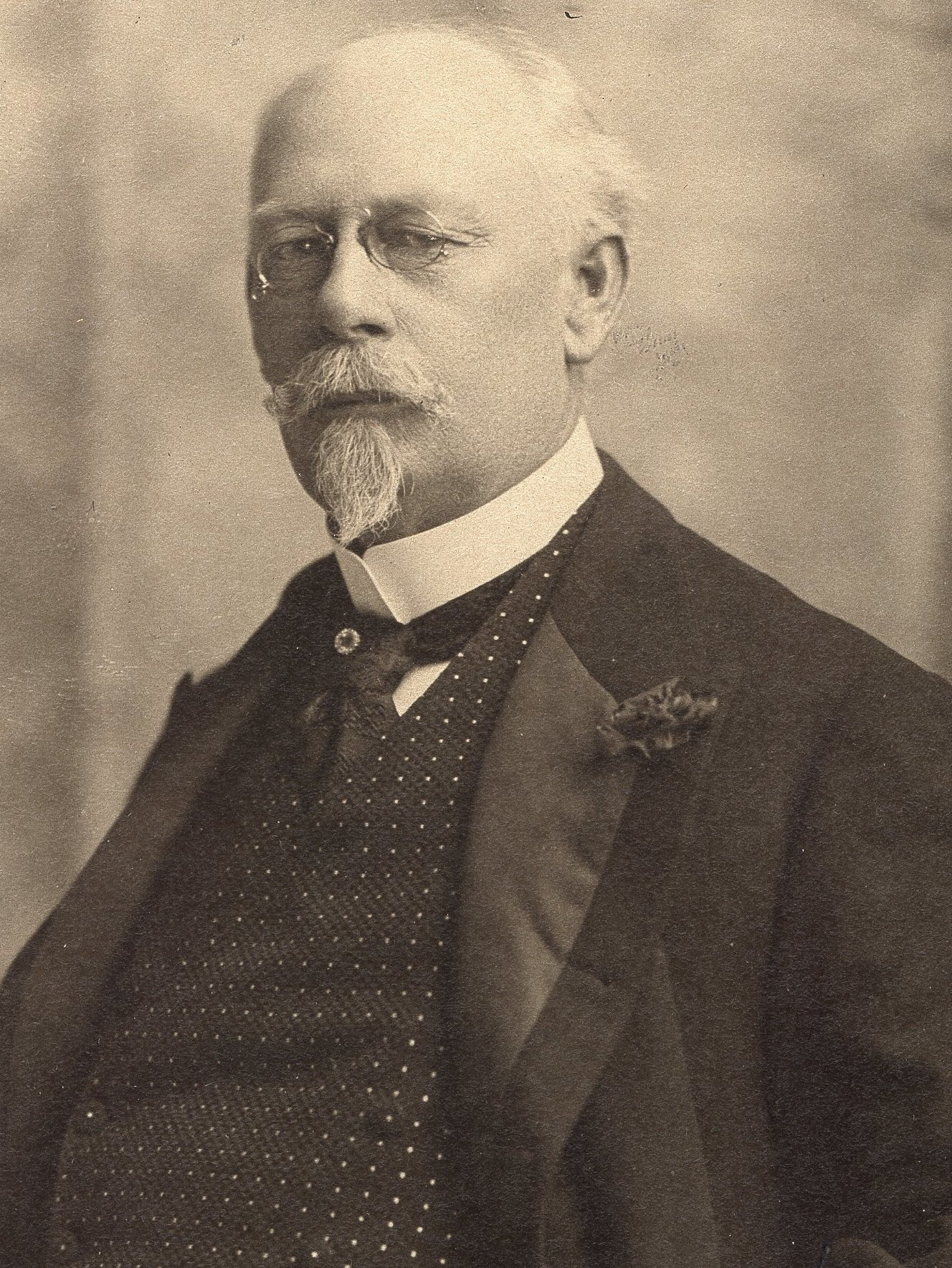

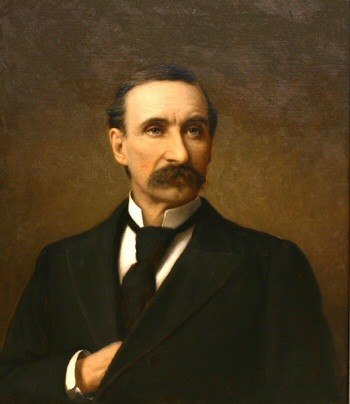
Nominee	George Wilbur Peck	William D. Hoard
Party	Democratic	Republican
Popular vote	160,388	132,068
Percentage	51.86%	42.71%
- County results Peck : 40–50% 50–60% 60–70% 70–80% 80–90% Hoard : 40–50% 50–60% 60–70%
Governor before election
William D. Hoard
Republican
Elected Governor
George Wilbur Peck
Democratic

The 1890 Wisconsin gubernatorial election was held on November 4, 1890.

Incumbent Republican Governor William D. Hoard was defeated by Democratic nominee George Wilbur Peck.

Peck became the first Democratic Governor of Wisconsin since William Robert Taylor in 1876.

== General election ==
=== Candidates ===
Major party candidates

- George Wilbur Peck, Democratic, incumbent Mayor of Milwaukee
- William D. Hoard, Republican, incumbent Governor

Other candidates

- Charles Alexander, Prohibition, Prohibition nominee for Wisconsin's 8th congressional district in 1888
- Reuben May, Union Labor, Greenback nominee for Governor of Wisconsin in 1879

=== Results ===
1890 Wisconsin gubernatorial election
Party	Candidate	Votes	%	±%
Democratic	George W. Peck	160,388	51.86%	+8.05%
Republican	William D. Hoard (incumbent)	132,068	42.70%	−6.83%
Prohibition	Charles Alexander	11,246	3.64%	−0.42%
Union Labor	Reuben May	5,447 (Note: This stated total seems likely to be a mistake. The county figures add up to 5,347)	1.76%	−0.83%
	Blank	105	0.03%	
Majority		28,320	9.16%	
Total votes		309,254	100.00%	
Democratic gain from Republican		Swing	+14.87%	

=== Results by county ===
Peck was the first Democrat to ever win Marinette County, Monroe County and Washburn County. Additionally, Green County, Portage County, and Sauk County voted Democratic for the first time since 1853. After this election, Buffalo County, Green County, Monroe County, Price County, Sauk County, and Washburn County would not vote Democratic again until 1932 while Eau Claire County would not do so again until 1950.

This was the first election in which Jackson County and Pierce County voted for the losing candidate, ending bellwether streaks that had extended back to 1851 and 1853, respectively.

County	George W. Peck Democratic		William D. Hoard Republican		Charles Alexander Prohibition		Reuben May Union Labor		Margin		Total votes cast
County	#	%	#	%	#	%	#	%	#	%	Total votes cast
Adams	292	27.42%	713	66.95%	27	2.54%	33	3.10%	-421	-39.53%	1,065
Ashland	1,728	47.14%	1,760	48.01%	102	2.78%	76	2.07%	-32	-0.87%	3,666
Barron	731	32.39%	1,147	50.82%	172	7.62%	207	9.17%	-416	-18.43%	2,257
Bayfield	432	35.47%	600	49.26%	69	5.67%	117	9.61%	-168	-13.79%	1,218
Brown	3,083	59.51%	1,938	37.41%	97	1.87%	63	1.22%	1,145	22.10%	5,181
Buffalo	1,408	52.56%	1,154	43.08%	93	3.47%	24	0.90%	254	9.48%	2,679
Burnett	48	9.01%	312	58.54%	149	27.95%	24	4.50%	-163 (Note: Hoard's margin over Alexander)	-30.59%	533
Calumet	1,720	66.46%	769	29.71%	24	0.93%	75	2.90%	951	36.75%	2,588
Chippewa	2,171	51.40%	1,792	42.42%	221	5.23%	40	0.95%	379	8.97%	4,224
Clark	1,493	45.55%	1,600	48.81%	162	4.94%	23	0.70%	-107	-3.26%	3,278
Columbia	2,418	45.26%	2,627	49.17%	243	4.55%	55	1.03%	-209	-3.91%	5,343
Crawford	1,503	49.97%	1,356	45.08%	67	2.23%	82	2.73%	147	4.89%	3,008
Dane	6,212	49.13%	5,632	44.54%	742	5.87%	59	0.47%	580	4.59%	12,645
Dodge	6,593	73.11%	2,210	24.51%	186	2.06%	29	0.32%	4,383	48.60%	9,018
Door	978	45.79%	1,061	49.67%	66	3.09%	31	1.45%	-83	-3.89%	2,136
Douglas	781	35.09%	997	44.79%	152	6.83%	296	13.30%	-216	-9.70%	2,226
Dunn	1,317	40.26%	1,662	50.81%	235	7.18%	57	1.74%	-345	-10.55%	3,271
Eau Claire	1,998	42.10%	1,861	39.21%	622	13.11%	265	5.58%	137	2.89%	4,746
Florence	155	38.18%	218	53.69%	21	5.17%	12	2.96%	63	15.52%	406
Fond du Lac	4,984	57.66%	3,399	39.32%	202	2.34%	59	0.68%	1,585	18.34%	8,644
Forest	127	48.11%	113	42.80%	11	4.17%	13	4.92%	14	5.30%	264
Grant	3,347	46.13%	3,513	48.42%	335	4.62%	60	0.83%	-166	-2.29%	7,255
Green	2,003	46.06%	1,980	45.53%	283	6.51%	83	1.91%	23	0.53%	4,349
Green Lake	1,691	55.10%	1,301	42.39%	63	2.05%	14	0.46%	390	12.71%	3,069
Iowa	2,107	45.88%	2,094	45.60%	380	8.28%	11	0.24%	13	0.28%	4,592
Jackson	1,007	37.84%	1,371	51.52%	252	9.47%	31	1.16%	-364	-13.68%	2,661
Jefferson	4,199	63.49%	2,222	33.60%	176	2.66%	17	0.26%	1,977	29.89%	6,614
Juneau	1,618	45.09%	1,826	50.89%	113	3.15%	31	0.86%	-208	-5.80%	3,588
Kenosha	1,657	52.06%	1,371	43.07%	61	1.92%	17	0.53%	286	8.99%	3,183 (Note: Includes 77 Blank votes)
Kewaunee	1,992	76.70%	545	20.99%	33	1.27%	27	1.04%	1,447	55.72%	2,597
La Crosse	3,819	52.32%	3,101	42.49%	290	3.97%	89	1.22%	718	9.84%	7,299
Lafayette	2,145	46.48%	2,270	49.19%	180	3.90%	20	0.43%	-125	-2.71%	4,615
Langlade	1,077	59.40%	661	36.46%	61	3.36%	14	0.77%	416	22.95%	1,813
Lincoln	1,398	58.52%	901	37.71%	55	2.30%	35	1.47%	497	20.80%	2,389
Manitowoc	4,087	67.08%	1,905	31.27%	52	0.85%	49	0.80%	2,182	35.81%	6,093
Marathon	3,500	69.43%	1,391	27.59%	69	1.37%	81	1.61%	2,109	41.84%	5,041
Marinette	1,377	48.59%	1,140	40.23%	135	4.76%	182	6.42%	237	8.36%	2,834
Marquette	1,185	59.70%	743	37.43%	49	2.47%	8	0.40%	442	22.27%	1,985
Milwaukee	24,520	55.48%	18,313	41.44%	153	0.35%	1,208	2.73%	6,207	14.04%	44,194
Monroe	2,136	48.02%	2,060	46.31%	178	4.00%	46	1.03%	76	1.71%	4,448 (Note: Includes 28 Blank votes)
Oconto	1,149	53.79%	896	41.95%	49	2.29%	42	1.97%	253	11.84%	2,136
Oneida	803	50.38%	697	43.73%	44	2.76%	50	3.14%	106	6.65%	1,594
Outagamie	4,213	64.35%	2,060	31.46%	182	2.78%	92	1.41%	2,153	32.89%	6,547
Ozaukee	2,326	83.52%	411	14.76%	15	0.54%	33	1.18%	1,915	68.76%	2,785
Pepin	433	37.04%	599	51.24%	131	11.21%	6	0.51%	-166	-14.20%	1,169
Pierce	867	31.13%	1,568	56.30%	251	9.01%	99	3.55%	-701	-25.17%	2,785
Polk	507	26.60%	1,154	60.55%	194	10.18%	51	2.68%	-647	-33.95%	1,906
Portage	2,342	55.70%	1,740	41.38%	100	2.38%	23	0.55%	602	14.32%	4,205
Price	652	46.44%	633	45.09%	72	5.13%	47	3.35%	19	1.35%	1,404
Racine	3,424	47.48%	3,274	45.40%	259	3.59%	254	3.52%	150	2.08%	7,211
Richland	1,425	38.79%	1,874	51.01%	258	7.02%	117	3.18%	-449	-12.22%	3,674
Rock	3,411	40.22%	4,629	54.59%	402	4.74%	38	0.45%	-1,218	-14.36%	8,480
Sauk	2,709	48.42%	2,463	44.02%	378	6.76%	45	0.80%	246	4.40%	5,595
Sawyer	220	36.97%	307	51.60%	38	6.39%	30	5.04%	-87	-14.62%	595
Shawano	2,010	62.04%	1,115	34.41%	59	1.82%	56	1.73%	895	27.62%	3,240
Sheboygan	5,013	62.74%	2,815	35.23%	88	1.10%	74	0.93%	2,198	27.51%	7,990
St. Croix	1,701	41.29%	1,955	47.45%	378	9.17%	86	2.09%	-254	-6.17%	4,120
Taylor	795	59.77%	480	36.09%	31	2.33%	24	1.80%	315	23.68%	1,330
Trempealeau	1,373	45.97%	1,387	46.43%	198	6.63%	29	0.97%	-14	-0.47%	2,987
Vernon	1,404	36.04%	2,216	56.88%	173	4.44%	103	2.64%	-812	-20.84%	3,896
Walworth	1,906	34.84%	3,134	57.29%	373	6.82%	57	1.04%	-1,228	-22.45%	5,470
Washburn	308	45.97%	304	45.37%	49	7.31%	9	1.34%	4	0.60%	670
Washington	2,990	69.10%	1,276	29.49%	31	0.72%	30	0.69%	1,714	39.61%	4,327
Waukesha	3,220	48.59%	3,145	47.46%	213	3.21%	49	0.74%	75	1.13%	6,627
Waupaca	2,117	43.23%	2,567	52.42%	178	3.63%	35	0.71%	-450	-9.19%	4,897
Waushara	830	31.62%	1,651	62.90%	112	4.27%	32	1.22%	-821	-31.28%	2,625
Winnebago	5,224	50.44%	4,646	44.86%	364	3.51%	122	1.18%	578	5.58%	10,356
Wood	1,979	56.25%	1,443	41.02%	45	1.28%	51	1.45%	536	15.24%	3,518
Total	160,388	51.86%	132,068	42.71%	11,246	3.64%	5,447	1.76%	28,320	9.16%	309,254

==== Counties that flipped from Republican to Democratic ====
- Buffalo
- Chippewa
- Crawford
- Dane
- Eau Claire
- Forest
- Green
- Green Lake
- Iowa
- Kenosha
- La Crosse
- Lincoln
- Marinette
- Marquette
- Milwaukee
- Monroe
- Oconto
- Portage
- Price
- Racine
- Sauk
- Shawano
- Taylor
- Washburn
- Waukesha
- Winnebago

== Bibliography ==
- Glashan, Roy R. (1979). American Governors and Gubernatorial Elections, 1775-1978. Meckler Books. ISBN 0-930466-17-9.
- Gubernatorial Elections, 1787-1997. Washington, D.C.: Congressional Quarterly Inc. 1998. ISBN 1-56802-396-0.
- Cunningham, Thomas J., ed. (1891). The Blue Book of the State of Wisconsin. The Milwaukee Litho. & Engr. Co.
