= Albin Francisco Schoepf =

Union Army general (1822–1886)

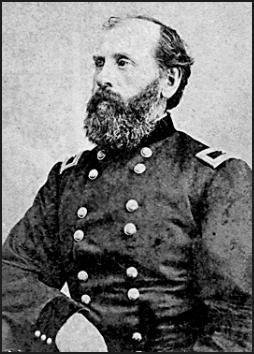
- Albin F. Schoepf
- Born: March 1, 1822; Podgórze; Galicia; Austrian Empire
- Died: May 10, 1886 (aged 64); Washington, D.C.
- Burial place: Congressional Cemetery, Washington, D.C.
- Military career
- Allegiance: Austrian Empire; Ottoman Empire; United States of America
- Branch: Austrian Army; Ottoman Army (United States Army) Union Army
- Service years: 1841–1849 (Austria); 1849–1851 (Ottoman Empire); 1861–1866 (USA)
- Rank: Major (Austria); Major (Ottoman Empire); Brigadier General (USA)
- Conflicts: Hungarian Revolution of 1848; American Civil War: Battle of Camp Wildcat; Battle of Mill Springs; Battle of Perryville

Albin Francisco Schoepf (Polish: Albin Franciszek Schoepf; March 1, 1822 – May 10, 1886) was a Polish-born artillery officer who became a Union brigadier general during the American Civil War. Obtaining professional military training in Austria, Schoepf briefly fought in the Austrian Army, then served as an officer in the Hungarian Revolutionary Army in the Hungarian Revolution of 1848. Schoepf came to America after his service, lived in Washington, D.C., and worked in various United States government bureaucratic positions before the Civil War. Appointed Union Army brigadier in late 1861, Schoepf was eventually raised to division command in the Western Theater. Personal conflicts with his commanding officer caused his transfer to administrative service in the East. Given command of the camp at Fort Delaware, Schoepf became responsible for Confederate prisoners of war. After the war, he returned to government service in the U.S. Patent Office.

== Early life ==
Schoepf was born in Podgórze, Poland, which was then part of the Austrian kingdom of Galicia. He entered Vienna Military Academy in 1837, became a lieutenant of artillery four years later, then served in Hungary as a captain in the Austrian Army. At the beginning of the Hungarian Revolution of 1848, he resigned his commission and enlisted as a private in the Hungarian Revolutionary Army under Lajos Kossuth. He was soon promoted to major. When Kossuth abdicated in 1849, Schoepf was exiled to Turkey, where according to Appleton's Cyclopædia of American Biography he may have served under General Józef Bem against Bedouin insurgents at Aleppo and then was raised to major and instructor of artillery in the Ottoman Empire's army. According to another source, it is possible he may have been interned with Kossuth and other Christian officers in Kutahia.

== Washington, D.C. ==
Schoepf emigrated to the United States with other Hungarian revolutionaries in 1851. He served as a clerk first in the United States Coast Survey. After befriending Joseph Holt, Schoepf clerked under Holt in the U.S. Patent Office and then the War Department. While working in Washington, D.C., Schoepf married Julie Bates Kesley in 1855; they had 9 children together.

== Civil War ==
Appointed a brigadier general of volunteers on September 30, 1861, Schoepf's brigade fought well at the Battle of Camp Wildcat, repulsing Confederates under Brig. Gen. Felix Zollicoffer. This was followed a few weeks later by Schoepf's precipitate retreat, by order of his superior officer, from London, Kentucky, to Crab Orchard, which the Confederates called the “Wild-Cat stampede.” Schoepf and his troops later fought Zollicoffer at the Battle of Mill Springs.

Proving himself an aggressive and able field commander, Schoepf was promoted to division command in August 1862, but often found himself at odds with Army of the Ohio commander Maj. Gen. Don Carlos Buell, especially after being denied orders to attack until late in the Battle of Perryville. Appointed to a military board of inquiry investigating Buell's conduct during the campaign, Schoepf made no secret of his disapproval of his commander's actions — so much so that Buell raised Schoepf's hostility as an issue. Not wanting his involvement to affect the Buell investigation's outcome, Schoepf asked Army general-in-chief Henry W. Halleck to transfer him to another assignment.

On April 13, 1863, Schoepf was ordered to report to Fort Delaware as commanding officer and served the balance of the war in that command. Fort Delaware, located on Pea Patch Island, served as a prisoner-of-war camp for captured Confederate soldiers and sailors. According to Laura M. Lee, historian at Fort Delaware State Park, "...it was not a pleasant place by any standards, historical records and the death rate testify to the fact that it was one of the more survivable prison camps, North or South." The prisoner complex held up to 11,500 at its peak (July 1863), with a cumulative population of 33,000 by war's end. According to "They Died at Fort Delaware 1861–1865" by historian Jocelyn P. Jamison and compiled from NARA records, about 2,460 prisoners died, 109 guards and 39 civilians.

== Postbellum career ==
Schoepf was mustered out of service on January 15, 1866. After the war, Schoepf returned to the U.S. Patent Office and died after a long illness, likely stomach cancer in Washington DC . He is buried in the Congressional Cemetery in Washington, D.C.

== See also ==
- List of American Civil War generals (Union)
