= Van S. Bennett =

19th century American politician

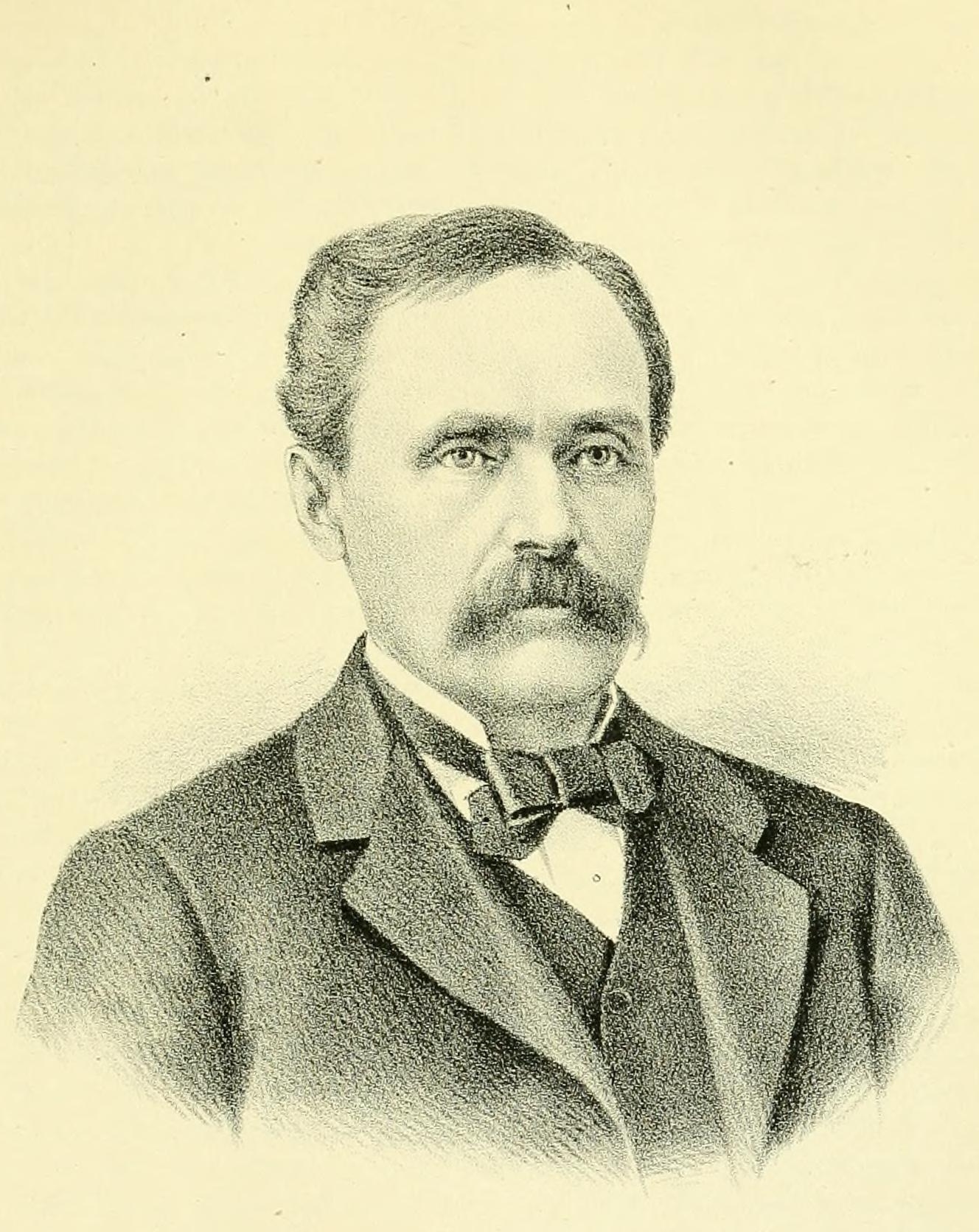
- From History of Vernon County, Wisconsin (1884)

Member of the Wisconsin Senate from the 4th district
- In office January 2, 1882 – January 5, 1885
- Preceded by: Ormsby B. Thomas
- Succeeded by: Joseph W. Hoyt

Chairman of the Board of Supervisors of Vernon County, Wisconsin
- In office November 12, 1878 – November 9, 1880
- Preceded by: Nathaniel McKie
- Succeeded by: Robert S. McMichael
- In office November 11, 1873 – November 10, 1874
- Preceded by: John W. Greenman
- Succeeded by: William F. Terhune

Member of the Wisconsin State Assembly from the Vernon 2nd district
- In office January 4, 1869 – January 2, 1871
- Preceded by: Daniel B. Priest
- Succeeded by: Henry A. Chase

Personal details
- Born: March 15, 1836 Medina, Ohio, U.S.
- Died: August 24, 1914 (aged 78) Rockton, Wisconsin, U.S.
- Cause of death: Kicked by his horse
- Resting place: Rockton Cemetery, Rockton, Wisconsin
- Party: Republican
- Spouses: Jennie L. Loveless (m. 1858; died 1898); Sara Emiline Marshall (m. 1900–1913)
- Children: Ona (Earll); (b. 1875; died 1950)
- Occupation: Lumberman

Military service
- Allegiance: United States
- Branch/service: United States Volunteers; Union Army
- Years of service: 1861–1864
- Rank: Captain, USV
- Unit: 12th Reg. Wis. Vol. Infantry
- Battles/wars: American Civil War

Van Swearengen Bennett (March 15, 1836 – August 24, 1914) was an American lumberman, Republican politician, and Wisconsin pioneer. He was a member of the Wisconsin State Senate (1882 & 1883) and State Assembly (1869 & 1870), representing Vernon County. He also served as a Union Army officer during the American Civil War.

== Early life ==
Van S. Bennett was born in Medina, Ohio, in March 1836. He received his early education there before moving with his parents to the Wisconsin Territory in 1846. They settled in the town of Medina, in Dane County, where Bennett completed his education. The family moved again, to Jefferson County in 1852.

In the Fall of 1853, the seventeen year old Bennett walked across the state of Wisconsin, from Jefferson County to La Crosse, where he purchased a section of government land to establish a homestead in Vernon County, Wisconsin. The following year, he worked in the town of Kickapoo, Wisconsin, assisting in the erection of the first saw mill in that town. In 1855, his family took up his homestead in Vernon County, and Bennett went to Richland County to work in the lumber camps.

== Civil War service ==
At the outbreak of the American Civil War, Bennett enlisted with a company of volunteers for service in the Union Army. They were enrolled as Company I in the 12th Wisconsin Infantry Regiment, and he was elected first lieutenant of the company while it was being organized. The regiment left the state in January 1862 and was sent south down the Mississippi River to Kentucky. That spring, the captain of Company I, Hartwell Turner, resigned, and Bennett was promoted to replace him. He served the rest of his enlistment as captain of the company.

With the 12th Wisconsin Infantry, Bennett participated in many of the important campaigns of the western theater of the war, including Vicksburg, the Meridian expedition, and Atlanta. His three-year enlistment expired in November 1864, and he returned to Wisconsin.

== Political and business career ==
On his return to Wisconsin, Bennett first returned to Richland County, where he had previously worked in the lumber industry. There he was elected superintendent of county schools in 1865, but the following year he left the county to take up his land in Vernon County, where he set about establishing a village on a part of his property. He purchased a grist mill in 1866, constructed the first saw mill in the area in 1867, and built a school house in 1869 which he donated to the town government. He finally laid out an official plat of the settlement in 1873, which became the community of Rockton, Wisconsin. A post office was established there in 1871, and Bennett was the second postmaster at Rockton.

He became affiliated with the Republican Party of Wisconsin, and, in 1868, he was their nominee for Wisconsin State Assembly in Vernon County's eastern Assembly district. He was elected without opposition in 1868 and again in 1869. He did not run for a third term in 1870.

In 1879, he purchased a stock of general goods in order to open a general store in Rockton. By the 1880s, Bennett was the largest landowner in Vernon County, owning about 2,300 acres. He was elected to the Wisconsin State Senate in 1881, representing Crawford and Vernon counties. He served in the 1882 and 1883 sessions.

Bennett remained active in state and county affairs into his later years. Serving several more times on the county board of supervisors and the town board, and serving as a trustee for the state asylum in Vernon County.

Bennett died after suffering a severe kick from his horse on the morning of August 23, 1914. He died a day later at his home in Rockton.

== Personal life and family ==
Van S. Bennett was the eldest of five children born to Jacob V. Bennett and his wife Eliza (née Groshong). Van's younger brother, William H. Bennett, also served in the Union Army during the Civil War, and died as a prisoner of war in Macon, Georgia, in 1864.

Van S. Bennett married Jennie Loveless in 1858. They had one daughter. His wife died in 1898 and he subsequently married Sara Emiline Marshall, who survived him.

Aside from his business and political interests, Bennett was active in Freemasonry and was a high officer in the Independent Order of Odd Fellows.

== Electoral history ==
=== Richland County Superintendent of Schools (1865) ===
Richland County, Wisconsin, Superintendent of Schools Election, 1865
| Party | Candidate | Votes | % | ±% |
|---|---|---|---|---|
General Election, November 7, 1865
| Republican | Van S. Bennett | 946 | 59.35% | −2.91% |
| Democratic | W. W. Stewart | 648 | 40.65% | |
| Total votes | | 298 | 18.70% | -5.82% |
| Total votes | | 1,594 | 100.0% | -9.12% |
| Republican hold | | | | |

=== Wisconsin Assembly (1868, 1869) ===
Wisconsin Assembly, Vernon 2nd District Election, 1868
| Party | Candidate | Votes | % | ±% |
|---|---|---|---|---|
General Election, November 3, 1868
| Republican | Van S. Bennett | 764 | 100.0% | |
| Total votes | | 764 | 100.0% | -13.38% |
| Republican hold | | | | |

Wisconsin Assembly, Vernon 2nd District Election, 1869
| Party | Candidate | Votes | % | ±% |
|---|---|---|---|---|
General Election, November 2, 1869
| Republican | Van S. Bennett (incumbent) | 921 | 100.0% | |
| Total votes | | 921 | 100.0% | +20.55% |
| Republican hold | | | | |

=== Wisconsin Senate (1881) ===
Wisconsin Senate, 4th District Election, 1881
| Party | Candidate | Votes | % | ±% |
|---|---|---|---|---|
General Election, November 2, 1869
| Republican | Van S. Bennett | 2,166 | 48.60% | −8.17% |
| Greenback | Chris Ellefson | 1,719 | 38.57% | +15.48% |
| Democratic | J. A. Robb | 572 | 12.83% | −7.30% |
| Plurality | | 447 | 10.03% | -23.65% |
| Total votes | | 4,457 | 100.0% | -37.85% |
| Republican hold | | | | |

Wisconsin State Assembly
| Preceded by Daniel B. Priest | Member of the Wisconsin State Assembly from the Vernon 2nd district January 4, 1869 – January 2, 1871 | Succeeded by Henry A. Chase |
Wisconsin Senate
| Preceded by Ormsby B. Thomas | Member of the Wisconsin Senate from the 4th district January 2, 1882 – January 5, 1885 | Succeeded by Joseph W. Hoyt |
Political offices
| Preceded by John W. Greenman | Chairman of the Board of Supervisors of Vernon County, Wisconsin; November 11, 1873 – November 10, 1874 | Succeeded by William F. Terhune |
| Preceded by Nathaniel McKie | Chairman of the Board of Supervisors of Vernon County, Wisconsin; November 12, 1878 – November 9, 1880 | Succeeded by Robert S. McMichael |
