= Joseph W. Hoyt =

19th century American politician

Member of the Wisconsin Senate from the 4th district
- In office January 5, 1885 – January 7, 1889
- Preceded by: Van S. Bennett
- Succeeded by: John J. Kempf

Member of the Wisconsin State Assembly from the Vernon 1st district
- In office January 2, 1871 – January 1, 1872
- Preceded by: Reuben May
- Succeeded by: Reuben May

Personal details
- Born: May 18, 1840 Craftsbury, Vermont, U.S.
- Died: July 8, 1902 (aged 62) Chaseburg, Wisconsin, U.S.
- Resting place: Viroqua Cemetery, Viroqua, Wisconsin
- Party: Republican
- Spouse: Elizabeth Isham (m. 1863–1902)
- Children: Charles Hoyt^{(b. 1866; died 1867)}; Russell Hoyt^{(b. 1867; died 1922)}; Harry Hoyt^{(b. 1871; died 1949)}

Military service
- Allegiance: United States
- Branch/service: United States Volunteers; Union Army
- Years of service: 1861–1862
- Rank: Private, USV
- Unit: 1st Reg. Vt. Vol. Cavalry
- Battles/wars: American Civil War

Joseph W. Hoyt (May 18, 1840 – July 8, 1902) was an American merchant and Republican politician. He was a member of the Wisconsin State Senate (1885 & 1887) and State Assembly (1871), representing Vernon County.

== Biography ==
Born in Craftsbury, Vermont, Hoyt served in the 1st Vermont Cavalry during the American Civil War. In 1863, he settled in Chaseburg, Wisconsin, and was a merchant and lumber dealer. He served on the town board, and then, on the Vernon County, Wisconsin Board of Supervisors. He was chairman of the county board. Hoyt served in the Wisconsin State Assembly in 1871 as a Republican and then in the Wisconsin State Senate during the 1885 and 1887 sessions. Hoyt died at his home in Chaseburg, Wisconsin.

== Electoral history ==
=== Wisconsin Assembly (1870) ===
Wisconsin Assembly, Vernon 1st District Election, 1870
Party	Candidate	Votes	%	±%
General Election, November 8, 1870
Republican	Joseph W. Hoyt	365	42.29%	
Independent Republican	Reuben May (incumbent)	325	37.66%	
Democratic	John T. Brinkermann	173	20.05%	
Total votes		863	100.0%	+27.29%
Republican hold				

=== Wisconsin Senate (1884) ===
Wisconsin Senate, 4th District Election, 1884
Party	Candidate	Votes	%	±%
General Election, November 8, 1884
Republican	Joseph W. Hoyt	4,320	53.69%	+5.09%
Democratic	C. C. Olson	3,515	43.69%	+30.85%
Prohibition	W. H. Thomson	211	2.62%	
Plurality		805	10.00%	-0.02%
Total votes		8,046	10.00%	+80.53%
Republican hold				

Wisconsin State Assembly
Preceded by Reuben May	Member of the Wisconsin State Assembly from the Vernon 1st district January 2, 1871 – January 1, 1872	Succeeded by Reuben May
Wisconsin Senate
Preceded by Van S. Bennett	Member of the Wisconsin Senate from the 4th district January 5, 1885 – January 7, 1889	Succeeded by John J. Kempf
