= Robinson Branch =

Robinson Branch may refer to:

- Robinson Branch (Kansas), a stream in Bourbon County, Kansas, United States
- Robinson Branch (Missouri), a stream in Vernon County, Missouri, United States
