= 22nd Kentucky Infantry Regiment =

- Active: January 20, 1862, to January 20, 1865
- Country: United States
- Allegiance: Union
- Branch: Infantry
- Engagements: Battle of Arkansas Post; Battle of Port Gibson; Battle of Champion Hill; Siege of Vicksburg, May 19 & 22 assaults Red River Campaign

The 22nd Kentucky Infantry Regiment was an infantry regiment that served in the Union Army during the American Civil War.

== Service ==
The 22nd Kentucky Infantry Regiment was organized at Louisa, Kentucky and mustered in on January 20, 1862.

The regiment was attached to 18th Brigade, Army of the Ohio, to March 1862. 26th Brigade, 7th Division, Army of the Ohio, to October 1862. 4th Brigade, District of West Virginia, Department of the Ohio, to November 1862. 3rd Brigade, 9th Division, Right Wing, XIII Corps (Old), Department of the Tennessee, to December 1862. 3rd Brigade, 3rd Division, Sherman's Yazoo Expedition to January 1863. 3rd Brigade, 9th Division, XIII Corps, to February 1863. 2nd Brigade, 9th Division, XIII Corps, to July 1863. 4th Brigade, 1st Division, XIII Corps, Army of the Tennessee, to August 1863; and Department of the Gulf to September 1863. 3rd Brigade, 1st Division, XIII Corps, to November 1863. Plaquemine, District of Baton Rouge, Louisiana, Department of the Gulf, to March 1864. 2nd Brigade, 1st Division, XIII Corps, to June 1864. 2nd Brigade, 3rd Division, XIX Corps, Department of the Gulf, to December 1864.

The 22nd Kentucky Infantry mustered out of service on January 20, 1865. Veterans and new recruits were transferred to the 7th Kentucky Veteran Volunteer Infantry.

== Detailed service ==
Operations in eastern Kentucky until March 1862. Garfield's Campaign against Humphrey Marshall December 23, 1861, to January 30, 1862. Advance on Paintsville, Ky., December 30, 1861, to January 7, 1862. Jennie's Creek January 7, Occupation of Paintsville October 8. Abbott's Hill January 9. Middle Creek, near Prestonburg, January 10. Occupation of Prestonburg January 11. Expedition to Pound Gap, Cumberland Mountains, March 14–17. Pound Gap March 16. Cumberland Gap Campaign March 28-June 18. Cumberland Mountain April 28. Occupation of Cumberland Gap June 18-September 16. Operations about Cumberland Gap August 2–6. Tazewell August 6. Evacuation of Cumberland Gap and retreat to Greenup, on the Ohio River, September 16-October 3. West Liberty September 24. Expedition to Charleston, Va., October 21-November 10. Moved to Memphis, Tenn., November 10–15, and duty there until December 20. Sherman's Yazoo Expedition December 20, 1862, to January 3, 1863. Chickasaw Bayou December 26–28. Chickasaw Bluff December 29, Expedition to Arkansas Post, Ark., January 3–10, 1863. Assault and capture of Fort Hindman, Arkansas Post, January 10–11. Moved to Young's Point, La., January 17–22 and duty there until March. Operations from Milliken's Bend to New Carthage March 31-April 17. Movement on Bruinsburg and turning Grand Gulf April 25–30. Battle of Port Gibson May 1. Battle of Champion Hill May 16. Big Black River Bridge May 17. Siege of Vicksburg May 18-July 4. Assaults on Vicksburg May 19 and 22. Advance on Jackson, Miss., July 5–10. Near Clinton July 8. Siege of Jackson July 10–17. At Big Black until August 13. Ordered to New Orleans, La., August 13. Duty at Carrollton, Brashear City and Berwick until October. Western Louisiana Campaign October 3-November 21. Duty at Plaquemine November 21, 1863, to March 24, 1864; and at Baton Rouge until April. Ordered to Alexandria, reporting there April 26. Red River Campaign April 26-May 22. Graham's Plantation May 5. Retreat to Morganza May 13–20. Mansura May 16. Expedition to the Atchafalaya May 31-June 6. Duty at Morganza, at mouth of the White River, Ark., and at Baton Rouge, La., until January 1865.

== Casualties ==
The regiment lost a total of 199 men during service; 3 officers and 48 enlisted men killed or mortally wounded, 3 officers and 145 enlisted men died of disease.

== Commanders ==
- Colonel Daniel W. Lindsey
- Colonel George W. Monroe, commanded at the Battle of Vicksburg as lieutenant colonel

== See also ==
- List of Kentucky Civil War Units
- Kentucky in the Civil War
