= Garrard, Kentucky =

Unincorporated community in Kentucky, United States

Garrard
- village
- Location within the state of Kentucky Garrard (the United States)
- Coordinates: 37°7′25″N 83°44′47″W
- Country: United States
- State: Kentucky
- County: Clay
- Elevation: 866 ft (264 m)
- Time zone: UTC-6 (Eastern (EST))
  - Summer (DST): UTC-5 (CST)
- ZIP codes: 40941
- GNIS feature ID: 512280

Garrard is a coal town in Clay County, Kentucky, United States on the junction of United States Highway 421 and Kentucky Highway 80, 2.5 miles (4.0 km) south of Manchester.

It was established in 1806 by James Garrard's son Daniel (1780–1866) as a salt works, he having bought the land in 1798, but didn't actually gain the name until the Cumberland and Manchester Railroad came through there in 1917. It was through the 19th century rather known as variously the Goose Creek Salt Works (after the adjacent Goose Creek), the Union Salt Works, the Buffalo Lick Salt Works, or just The Salt Works.

Its post office was established on 1917-04-28 by postmaster James H. Brashear, and that was named Garrard, likely not after James or Daniel but rather after James' great-grandsons William Toulmin Garrard and Edward Gibson Garrard, who owned the land, although another story is that it was named after James' grandson Theophilus T. Garrard.

== Garrard family connections ==
Members of the Garrard family born at the salt works include Eliza Ann Garrard (1809, daughter of Daniel), James H. Garrard, Theophilus T. Garrard, Edward Pendleton Garrard (1814), Maria Pacheco Padilla Garrard (1815), Margaret Garrard (1818, daughter of Daniel), William Mountjoy Garrard (1822), Catherine Francis Garrard (1825), Lucinda C. Garrard (1827), Sophia Garrard (1830), and Pauline Mountjoy Garrard (1833).

== 19th century decline and Civil War destruction ==
The salt works were deliberately destroyed by the Union army in the United States Civil War, as a preventative measure after the Confederate side had boasted of their value as a military objective with respect to anything else in the entire state of Kentucky. Confederate forces had captured Manchester in the summer of 1862 and had taken between 3,500 to 4,000 US bushels (120,000 to 140,000 L) of salt from the Garrard salt works and the works of their competitors the White family. A report of the commander of the brigade who re-took Manchester, Charles Craft, explained the need to destroy the works, saying that "every circumstance led to the belief that the quantity [of salt] on hand would have been shortly taken" when his brigade left to fight elsewhere that it was needed, and that "as a matter of economy; the destruction of the works seemed to be a wise movement".

It took 500 soldiers 36 hours, overseen by three colonels of the regiment. They disabled or destroyed all of the furnaces, pumps, and wells; and 30,000 US bushels (1,100,000 L) of salt found on the site. Cannonballs were forced into pipes; pumps removed, broken, and then pushed back into wells; and the salt dumped into rivers. A few "loyal citizens around and in the neighbourhood", as described in reports, were permitted to take some salt so that they had a supply for themselves. Theophilus T. Garrard requested compensation after the war from the federal government, but this was denied. Although rebuilt post-war, the salt works were not the major industry in the region that they had been pre-war, as competition from other saltworks elsewhere and improved transport drive down prices.

The salt industry had been in decline even before the war. Although the Goose Creek Salt Works produced the same US$5,000 worth of salt in 1850 and 1860, the Garrards had had to diversity into increased farmland holdings, up from 260 acres (110 ha) cultivated land and 300 acres (120 ha) uncultivated in 1850 to 480 acres (190 ha) cultivated and 1,180 acres (480 ha), although the valuation of these holdings had gone down from US$32,000 to US$28,000. In 1850 they had 11 employees at the salt works and owned 37 slaves; but in 1860 owned 21 slaves.

A continual pre-war problem for salt making at the Salt Works had been that Goose Creek river was only navigable at certain times of year for commercial shipping. Several largely ineffective steps were taken to improve navigability, with Daniel Garrard along with two others appointed river commissioners in 1810 with powers to unblock the river, and a subscription raising measure approved by the Kentucky General Assembly in 1813. The most effective measure was Daniel Garrard using 32 of his "hands" (i.e. slaves) to clear the South Fork Kentucky River of obstacles in 1818.

Several calls were made by Garrard and others to further improve matters, to legislators that did not heed them, in part because of national economic depression that began in 1838. A 1835 report by the Kentucky Board of Internal Improvements stated for example:

One of the proprietors of the Goose Creek salt works, the most extensive establishment of the kind west of the mountains [...] informed me that, in case a certain navigation was provided, they were ready to furnish at once 500,000 bushels per annum, and could enlarge their establishment as to meet the demand [...]

Other ideas put forward included a grand plan suggested in a 1836-01-19 report by R. P. Baker, Kentucky's first chief engineer, proposing a canal between the Ohio River and the Atlantic Ocean that would arrive at The Three Forks and proceed up the South Fork Kentucky River and Goose Creek. It would then employ a 36-mile-long (58 km) canal from the Salt Works to the Cumberland River at Barboursville, and thence via Yellow Creek, Powell's River, the Clinch, the Tennessee, and the Hiwassee, and the Savannah, to the Gulf of Mexico.

A survey was done in 1837, with the projected route to the Salt Works following the Cumberland from the Barboursville ford, along the Richland Creek valley, through a 1 mile (1.6 km) tunnel under the ridge to the Collins Fork of Goose Creek, and finally along Collins to the Salt Works; but nothing further came of the plan. The canal would have required several locks to account for the 121.8 feet (37.1 m) height difference between the Salt Works and the Cumberland ford.

== Railway ==
By the middle 20th century, Garrard railroad stop included a water supply tank, owned by the Louisville and Nashville Railroad. It was 100 feet (30 m) west of the post office, and held 63,000 US gallons (240,000 L), supplying 12,000 US gallons (45,000 L) per day to steam locomotives.

== Sources ==
- Rennick, Robert M. (2000c). "Clay County — Post Offices". County Histories of Kentucky (176). Morehead State University.
- des Cognets, Anna Russel (1898). Governor Garrard of Kentucky, his descendants and relatives. Lexingon, Ky: James M. Byres. (Governor Garrard of Kentucky, his descendants and relatives at the Internet Archive)
- Billings, Dwight B.; Blee, Kathleen M. (2000). The Road to Poverty: The Making of Wealth and Hardship in Appalachia. Cambridge University Press. ISBN 9780521655460.
- Lewis, Patrick A. (2015). For Slavery and Union: Benjamin Buckner and Kentucky Loyalties in the Civil War. University Press of Kentucky. ISBN 9780813160818.
- Baker, John Augustus; Price, William Evans (1956). Public and Industrial Water Supplies of the Eastern Coal Field Region, Kentucky. United States Geological Survey Circular. Vol. 369.
- Collins, Lewis; Collins, Richard Henry (1874). "Historical sketch of internal improvements in Kentucky". History of Kentucky. Collins Historical Sketches of Kentucky. Vol. 1. Covington, Kentucky: Collins & Company.
