= Robinson Creek, Kentucky =

Unincorporated community in Kentucky, United States

Robinson Creek
- Unincorporated community
- Location within the state of Kentucky Robinson Creek (the United States)
- Coordinates: 37°23′13″N 82°32′15″W
- Country: United States
- State: Kentucky
- County: Pike
- Elevation: 758 ft (231 m)
- Time zone: UTC-5 (Eastern (EST))
  - Summer (DST): UTC-4 (EDT)
- ZIP codes: 41560
- GNIS feature ID: 502089

Robinson Creek is an unincorporated community located in Pike County, Kentucky, United States.

== History ==
A post office called Robinson Creek has been in operation since 1848. The community took its name from nearby Robinson Creek.

== Notable people ==
- Reuben May, Wisconsin legislator, was born in Robinson Creek.
