= 8th Kentucky Infantry Regiment (Union) =

- Active: October 1861 to February 1865
- Country: United States
- Allegiance: Union
- Branch: Infantry
- Engagements: Battle of Perryville; Battle of Stones River; Tullahoma Campaign; Battle of Chickamauga; Chattanooga campaign Battle of Lookout Mountain; Battle of Missionary Ridge

The 8th Kentucky Infantry Regiment was an infantry regiment that served in the Union Army during the American Civil War.

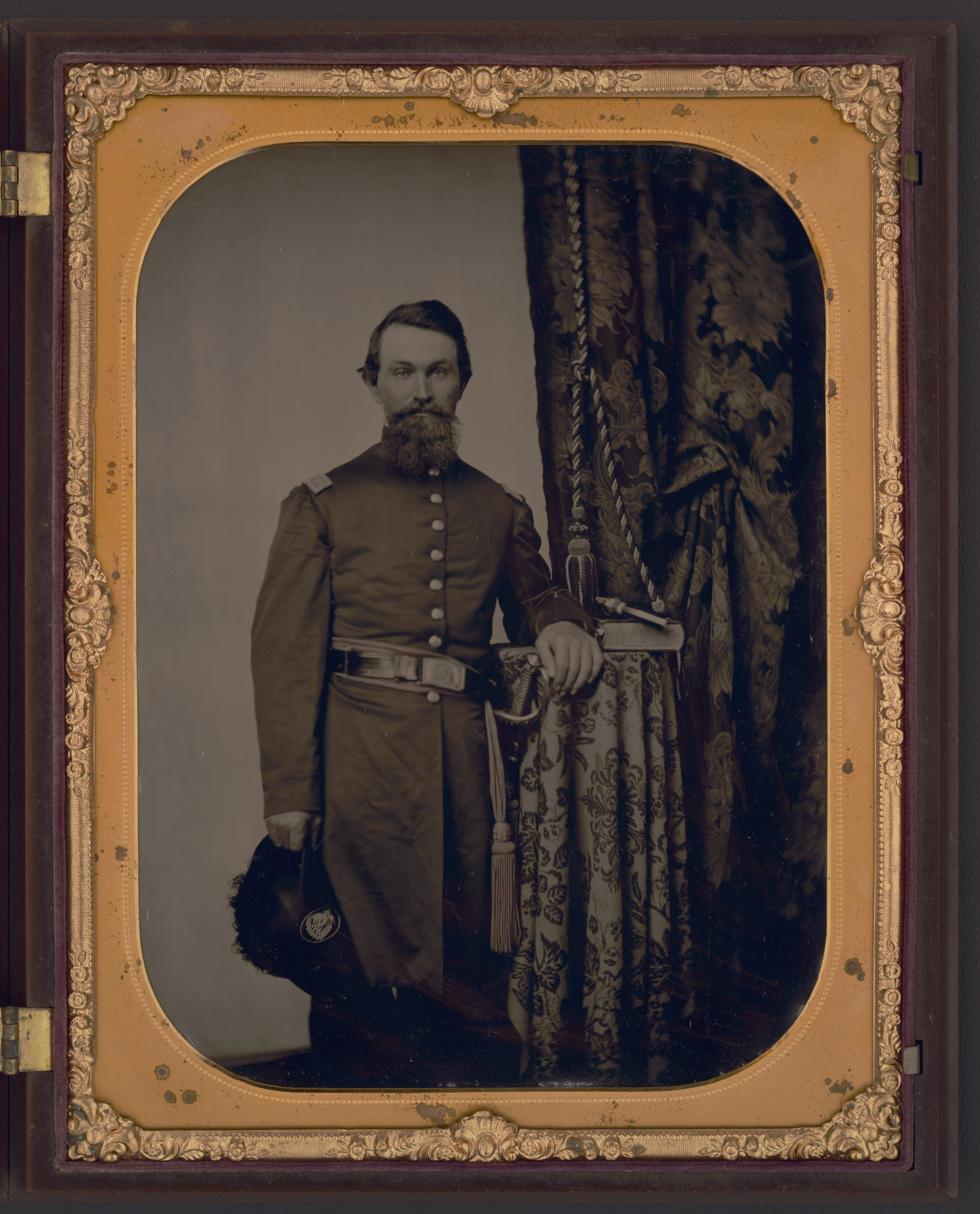
Captain John Wilson of Company C

== Service ==
The 8th Kentucky Infantry Regiment was organized at Estill Springs and Lebanon, Kentucky and mustered in for a three-year enlistment in October 1861.

The regiment was attached to Thomas' Command to January 1862. 16th Brigade, Army of the Ohio, to February 1862, 23rd Independent Brigade, Army of the Ohio, to September 1862. 23rd Brigade, 5th Division, Army of the Ohio, September 1862. 23rd Brigade, 5th Division, II Corps, Army of the Ohio, to November 1862. 3rd Brigade, 3rd Division, Left Wing, XIV Corps, Army of the Cumberland, to January 1863. 3rd Brigade, 3rd Division, XXI Corps, Army of the Cumberland, to October 1863. 2nd Brigade, 1st Division, IV Corps, to April 1864. 1st Separate Brigade, Post of Chattanooga, Tennessee, Department of the Cumberland, to November 1864. 2nd Brigade, District of the Etowah, Department of the Cumberland, to February 1865.

The 8th Kentucky Infantry mustered out of service in February 1865; veterans and new recruits were transferred to the 4th Kentucky Mounted Infantry.

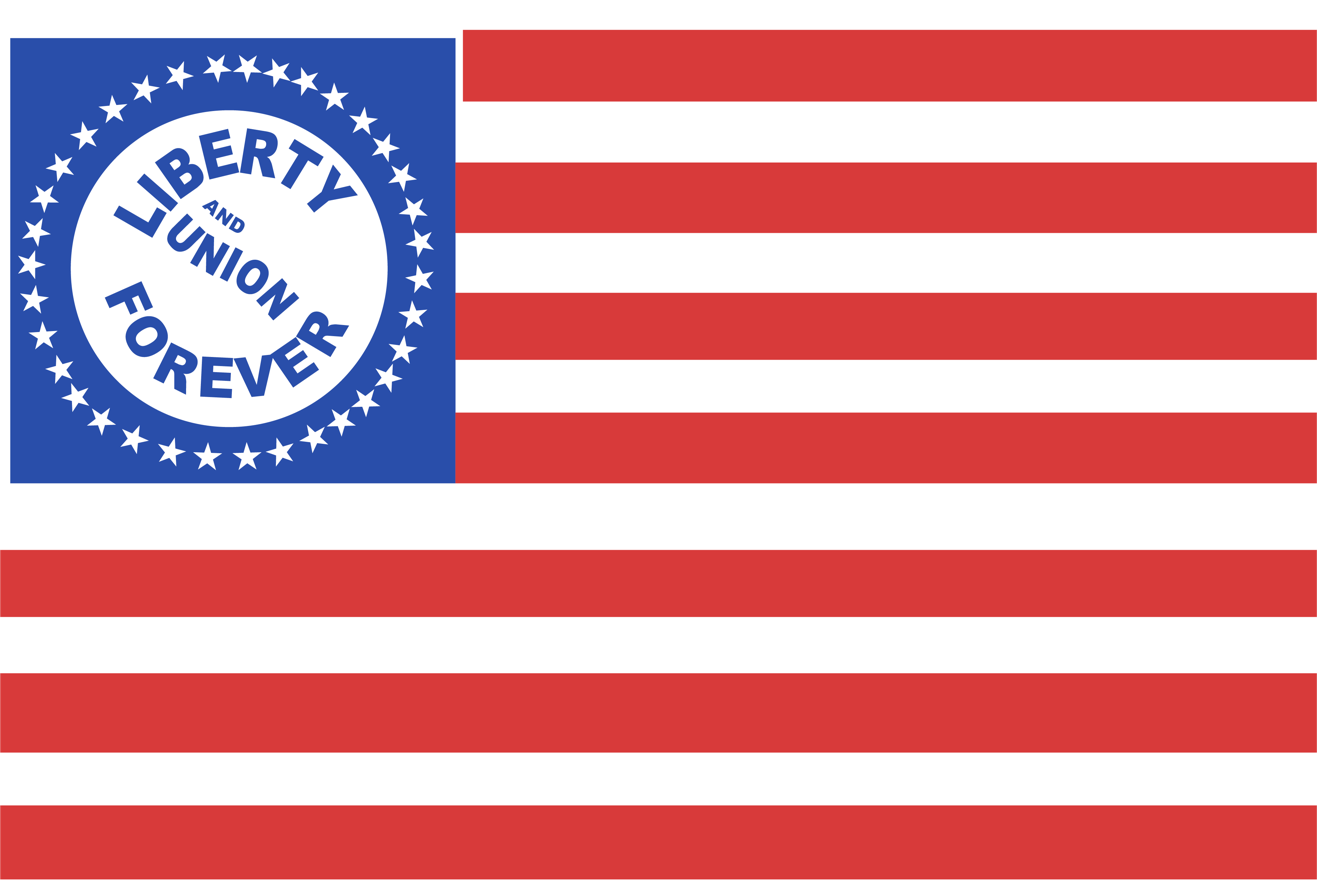
Guide flag carried by the regiment

== Detailed service ==
Duty at Estill Springs, Kentucky, until November 28, 1861. Marched to Lebanon, Kentucky, November 28-December 3, and duty there until March 1862. Moved to Nashville, Tennessee, March 10–23; then to Murfreesboro, Tennessee, April 3–4, and to Wartrace, Tennessee May 3. Duty there until June 11. Dumont's Expedition over Cumberland Mountains June 11–19. Moved to Elk River Bridge July 4; then to Tullahoma July 9, and joined Nelson. Marched to Louisville, in pursuit of Bragg August 21-September 26. Russellville and Glasgow September 30. Pursuit of Bragg into Kentucky October 1–22. Battle of Perryville October 8. Nelson's Cross Roads October 18. Reconnaissance on Madison Road October 19. March to Nashville, Tennessee, October 22-November 12, and duty there until December 26. Murfreesboro Pike November 9. Dobbins' Ferry, near Lavergne, December 9. Advance on Murfreesboro December 26–30. Battle of Stones River December 30–31, 1862 and January 1–3, 1863. At Murfreesboro until June. Tullahoma Campaign June 23-July 7. Liberty Gap June 25–26. At McMinnville until August 16. Passage of Cumberland Mountains and Tennessee River and Chickamauga Campaign August 16-September 22. Ringgold, Georgia, September 11. Battle of Chickamauga September 19–20. Siege of Chattanooga September 24-November 23. Reopening Tennessee River October 26–29. Chattanooga-Ringgold Campaign November 23–27. Lookout Mountain November 23–24. Missionary Ridge November 25. Taylor's Ridge, Ringgold Gap, November 27. At Shellmound, Tennessee, until March 1864. Demonstration on Dalton, Georgia, February 22–27. Buzzard's Roost Gap and Rocky Faced Ridge February 23–25. Moved to Chattanooga, Tennessee, March 1, and garrison duty there until September 26, 1864. Moved to Elk River Bridge September 26 and duty there until October 20. At Chattanooga until November 28 and at Bridgeport, Alabama, until January 1865.

== Casualties ==
The regiment lost a total of 205 men during service; 4 officers and 56 enlisted men killed or mortally wounded, 1 officer and 144 enlisted men died of disease.

== Commanders ==
- Colonel Sidney Barnes
- Lieutenant Colonel Reuben May
- Lieutenant Colonel James D. Mayhew
- Major Green B. Broaddus
- Major John S. Clark

== See also ==
- List of Kentucky Civil War Units
- Kentucky in the Civil War
