= 7th Kentucky Infantry Regiment (Union) =

- Active: September 22, 1861 - March 11, 1866
- Country: United States
- Allegiance: Union
- Branch: Infantry
- Engagements: Battle of Camp Wildcat; Battle of Richmond (detachment); Battle of Perryville (detachment); Yazoo Pass Expedition; Battle of Chickasaw Bayou; Battle of Arkansas Post; Battle of Port Gibson; Battle of Champion Hill; Battle of Big Black River Bridge; Siege of Vicksburg, May 19 & 22 assaults Jackson Expedition

The 7th Kentucky Infantry Regiment was an infantry regiment that served in the Union Army during the American Civil War.

== Service ==
The 7th Kentucky Infantry Regiment was organized at Camp Dick Robinson and mustered in for a three-year enlistment on September 22, 1861. It was mustered in as the 3rd Regiment Kentucky Volunteer Infantry under the command of Colonel Theophilus Toulmin Garrard. Another regiment was also mustered in as the 3rd Kentucky Infantry, so the designation was changed. Despite the change, members of the regiment continued to refer to it as the 3rd Kentucky Infantry (or "Old 3rd") well into 1863. The regiment was recruited in Clay, Knox, Laurel, Owsley (including what is now Lee County), and Whitley counties.

The regiment was attached to Thomas' Command, Army of the Ohio, to January 1862. 12th Brigade, 1st Division, Army of the Ohio, to March 1862. 24th Brigade, 7th Division, Army of the Ohio, to October 1862. 3rd Brigade, District of West Virginia, Department of the Ohio, to November, 1862. 2nd Brigade, 9th Division, Right Wing, XIII Corps (Old), Department of the Tennessee, to December 1862. 2nd Brigade, 3rd Division, Sherman's Yazoo Expedition, to January 1863. 2nd Brigade, 9th Division, XIII Corps, Army of the Tennessee, to February 1863. 1st Brigade, 9th Division, XIII Corps, to July 1863. 3rd Brigade, 1st Division, XIII Corps, Department of the Tennessee, to August 1863, and Department of the Gulf to November 1863. Plaquemine, District of Baton Rouge, Louisiana, Department of the Gulf, to March 1864, 2nd Brigade, 1st Division, XIII Corps, to June 1864. 1st Brigade, 3rd Division, XIX Corps, to December 1864. District of Baton Rouge, Louisiana, to April 1865. Provisional Brigade, District of Baton Rouge, Department of the Gulf, to March 1866.

While at Cumberland Gap, supplies ran desperately low. General George W. Morgan ordered a handpicked detachment of 400 men be mounted on artillery and supply wagon horses, and move toward Lexington, Kentucky, to obtain supplies. Colonel Garrard was with these men at a small skirmish at the mouth of Bear Creek. Garrard then left the detachment in the command of Major Isaac N. Cardwell. These men rode into the Battle of Richmond, and were scattered by a rear attack from Scott's Louisiana Cavalry. Some returned to their homes in eastern Kentucky, others rejoined the army at Cumberland Gap, and a small number retreated with the Union forces to Lexington and then to Louisville. Enough men remained to form one company from the 7th Kentucky, one company from the 32nd Kentucky, and one company from the 3rd Tennessee to form Garrard's Detachment at Louisville. Garrard joined the shattered remains of General William "Bull" Nelson's army at Louisville. Many men of the 7th Kentucky were captured and paroled at Richmond, and ordered to report to Cincinnati to await exchange.

The 7th Kentucky Infantry mustered out of service in Louisville, Kentucky, on October 5, 1864. On December 24, 1864, veterans of the 7th Kentucky, 19th Kentucky Infantry, and 22nd Kentucky Infantry who reenlisted were organized with new recruits as the 7th Kentucky Veteran Volunteer Infantry in Baton Rouge, Louisiana. It spent the majority of service on garrison duty in Baton Rouge, and mustered out on March 11, 1866.

== Detailed service ==
Moved to Mt. Vernon, Kentucky, October 1861, and duty there until March 1862. Action at Camp Wild Cat, or Rockcastle Hills, October 21, 1861. Reconnaissance toward Cumberland Gap and skirmishes March 21–23, 1862. Cumberland Gap Campaign March 28-June 18. Occupation of Cumberland Gap June 18 to September 16. Evacuation of Cumberland Gap and retreat to Greenupsburg, Ohio, September 16-October 3. Expedition to Charleston, Virginia, October 21-November 10. Ordered to Memphis, Tennessee, November 10; duty there until December 20. Sherman's Yazoo Expedition December 20, 1862 to January 2, 1863. Chickasaw Bayou December 26–28. Chickasaw Bluff December 29. Expedition to Arkansas Post, Arkansas, January 3–10, 1863. Assault on and capture of Fort Hindman, Arkansas Post, January 10–11. Moved to Young's Point, Louisiana, January 15–23, and duty there until March. Moved to Milliken's Bend March 8. Operations from Milliken's Bend to New Carthage March 31-April 17. James Plantation, near New Carthage, April 6 and 8. Dunbar's Plantation, Bayou Vidal, April 15. Expedition from Perkins' Plantation to Hard Times Landing April 25–29, Phelps' and Clark's Bayous April 26. Choctaw Bayou and Lake Bruin April 28. Battle of Thompson's Hill, Port Gibson, May 1. Battle of Champion Hill May 16. Battle of Big Black River Bridge May 17. Siege of Vicksburg May 18-July 4. Assaults on Vicksburg May 19 and 22, Advance on Jackson July 5–10. Near Clinton July 8. Near Jackson July 9. Siege of Jackson July 10–17. Ordered to New Orleans, Louisiana, August 13. Duty at Carrollton, Brashear City, and Berwick until October. Western Louisiana Campaign October 3-November 20. Duty at Plaquemine until March 1864. Moved to Baton Rouge, Louisiana, March 23, and duty there until October. At mouth of White River and Duvall's Bluff, Arkansas, October 6-November 10. At Baton Rouge until May 1, 1865, and at Clinton until March 1866

== Casualties ==
The 7th Kentucky lost a total of 319 men during service; 3 officers and 40 enlisted men were killed or mortally wounded, 2 officers and 274 enlisted men died from disease.

== Commanders ==
- Colonel Theophilus Toulmin Garrard
- Colonel Reuben May
- Colonel George Wood Monroe
- Lieutenant Colonel John Lucas - commanded at the battles of Champion Hill and Vicksburg

== Notable members ==
- Captain George Madison Adams, Company H - U.S. Representative from Kentucky, 1867-1873 (8th District), 1873-1875 (9th District)

== See also ==
- List of Kentucky Civil War Units
- Kentucky in the Civil War
