= 17th Ohio Infantry Regiment =

- Active: April 20, 1861, to August 15, 1861 (3 months); August 30, 1861, to July 16, 1865 (3 years)
- Country: United States
- Allegiance: Union
- Branch: Union Army
- Type: Infantry
- Engagements: Battle of Wildcat Mountain; Battle of Mill Springs; Siege of Corinth; Battle of Perryville; Battle of Stones River; Tullahoma Campaign; Battle of Hoover's Gap; Battle of Chickamauga; Siege of Chattanooga; Battle of Missionary Ridge; Atlanta campaign; Battle of Resaca; Battle of Kennesaw Mountain; Siege of Atlanta; Battle of Jonesborough; Sherman's March to the Sea; Carolinas campaign; Battle of Bentonville

The 17th Ohio Infantry Regiment was an infantry regiment in the Union Army during the American Civil War.

== Service ==
=== Three-months regiment ===
In response to U.S. President Abraham Lincoln's call on April 15, 1861, for 75,000 volunteers, ten companies composing the 17th Ohio Volunteer Infantry Regiment were enrolled in late April 1861. On June 5, 1861, at Camp Anderson, Lancaster, Ohio, under the command of Colonel John M. Connell, the 17th Ohio's companies were mustered into service for 3 months, to date from April 27, 1861. The regiment moved to Benwood, Virginia, then to Parkersburg, Virginia. The regiment was attached to Rosecrans' Brigade, Western Virginia, to July 1861; 2nd Brigade, Army of Occupation, Western Virginia, to August 1861.

The 17th Ohio Infantry Regiment performed railroad guard duty and operated against guerrillas in Jackson County, Virginia, until July. (Two companies were assigned garrison duty in Ravenswood, Virginia, until July 10.) The 17th Ohio skirmished with rebels at Glenville, Virginia July 7, and participated in the Western Virginia Campaign July 7–17. The regiment subsequently concentrated at Buckhannon, Virginia, and then participated in the expedition to Sutton, Virginia, July 15–20. The remainder of its duty was at Sutton until August 3, when it left Virginia for Zanesville, Ohio. The 17th Ohio mustered out of service on August 15, 1861, at Camp Goddard, Zanesville. During its service, the regiment lost three men: one to drowning; two to disease.

=== Three-years regiment ===
The 17th Ohio Infantry was reorganized at Camp Dennison near Cincinnati, Ohio, and mustered in for 3 years' service on August 30, 1861, under the command of Colonel John M. Connell.

The regiment was attached to 1st Brigade, Army of the Ohio, November to December 1861. 1st Brigade, 1st Division, Army of the Ohio, to September 1862. 1st Brigade, 1st Division, III Corps, Army of the Ohio, to November 1862. 1st Brigade, 3rd Division, Center, XIV Corps, Army of the Cumberland, to January 1863. 1st Brigade, 3rd Division, XIV Corps, Army of the Cumberland and Army of Georgia, to July 1865.

The 13th Ohio Infantry mustered out of service at Louisville, Kentucky, on July 16, 1865.

== Detailed service ==
Ordered to Camp Dick Robinson, Ky., September 30, and duty there until October 19. March to Wild Cat October 19–21. Action at Camp Wild Cat, Rockcastle Hills, October 21. Operations about Mill Springs and Somerset, Ky., December 1–13, 1861. Advance on Camp Hamilton January 1–17, 1862. Battle of Mill Springs January 19–20. Moved from Mill Springs to Louisville, Ky., February 10–16, thence to Nashville, Tenn., February 18-March 2, and duty there until March 20. March to Savannah, Tenn., March 20-April 8. Advance on and siege of Corinth, Miss., April 29-May 30. Pursuit to Booneville May 31-June 6. Buell's Campaign in northern Alabama and middle Tennessee June to August. Duty at Iuka, Miss., and Tuscumbia, Ala. March to Louisville, Ky., in pursuit of Bragg August 20-September 26. Pursuit of Bragg into Kentucky October 1–15. Battle of Perryville, Ky., October 8. March to Nashville, Tenn., October 16-November 7, and duty there until December 26. Advance on Murfreesboro December 26–30. Battle of Stones River December 30–31, 1862 and January 1–3, 1863. Duty at Murfreesboro until June. Expedition toward Columbia March 4–14. Tullahoma Campaign June 23-July 7. Hoover's Gap June 24–26. Occupation of middle Tennessee until August 16. Passage of Cumberland Mountains and Tennessee River and Chickamauga Campaign August 16-September 22. Battle of Chickamauga September 19–21. Siege of Chattanooga, Tenn., September 24-November 23. Near Chattanooga October 8. Reopening Tennessee River October 25–29. Brown's Ferry October 27. Chattanooga-Ringgold Campaign November 23–27. Orchard Knob November 23–24. Missionary Ridge November 25. Regiment reenlisted January 1, 1864. Veterans on furlough January 22 to March 7, 1864. Reconnaissance to Dalton, Ga., February 22–27, 1864. Tunnel Hill, Buzzard's Roost Gap and Rocky Faced Ridge February 23–25. Atlanta Campaign May 1 to September 8. Demonstrations on Rocky Faced Ridge May 8–11. Battle of Resaca May 14–15. Advance on Dallas May 18–25. Operations on line of Pumpkin Vine Creek and battles about Dallas, New Hope Church and Allatoona Hills May 25-June 5. Operations about Marietta and against Kennesaw Mountain June 10-July 2. Pine Mountain June 11–14. Lost Mountain June 15–17. Assault on Kennesaw June 27. Ruff's Station, Smyrna Camp Ground, July 4. Chattahoochee River July 5–17. Peachtree Creek July 19–20. Siege of Atlanta July 22-August 25. Utoy Creek August 5–7. Flank movement on Jonesboro August 25–30. Battle of Jonesboro August 31-September 1. Operations against Hood in northern Georgia and northern Alabama September 29-November 3. March to the sea November 15-December 10. Siege of Savannah December 10–21. Campaign of the Carolinas January to April 1865. Fayetteville, N. C., March 11. Battle of Bentonville March 19–21. Occupation of Goldsboro March 24. Advance on Raleigh April 10–14. Occupation of Raleigh April 14. Bennett's House April 26. Surrender of Johnston and his army. March to Washington, D. C, via Richmond, Va., April 29-May 20. Grand Review of the Armies May 24. Moved to Louisville, Ky., June, and duty there until July.

== Casualties ==
The regiment lost a total of 232 men during service; 6 officers and 71 enlisted men killed or mortally wounded, 1 officer and 154 enlisted men died of disease.

== Commanders ==
- Colonel John M. Connell - resigned November 12, 1863
- Colonel Jesse Durbin Ward - commanded at the battle of Chickamauga as lieutenant colonel; promoted to colonel November 13, 1863; resigned November 8, 1864, due to wounds received in battle at Chickamauga
- Lieutenant Colonel Benjamin Showers - promoted from captain to lieutenant colonel May 9, 1864; mustered out with regiment July 16, 1865

Due to wounds received at Chickamauga, Colonel Ward was absent from the regiment until April 13, 1864. Major James W. Stinchcomb commanded the regiment during this period, and resigned on May 2, 1864.

== See also ==
- List of Ohio Civil War units
- Ohio in the Civil War
