= William E. Smith (politician) =

19th-century American politician (1824–1883)

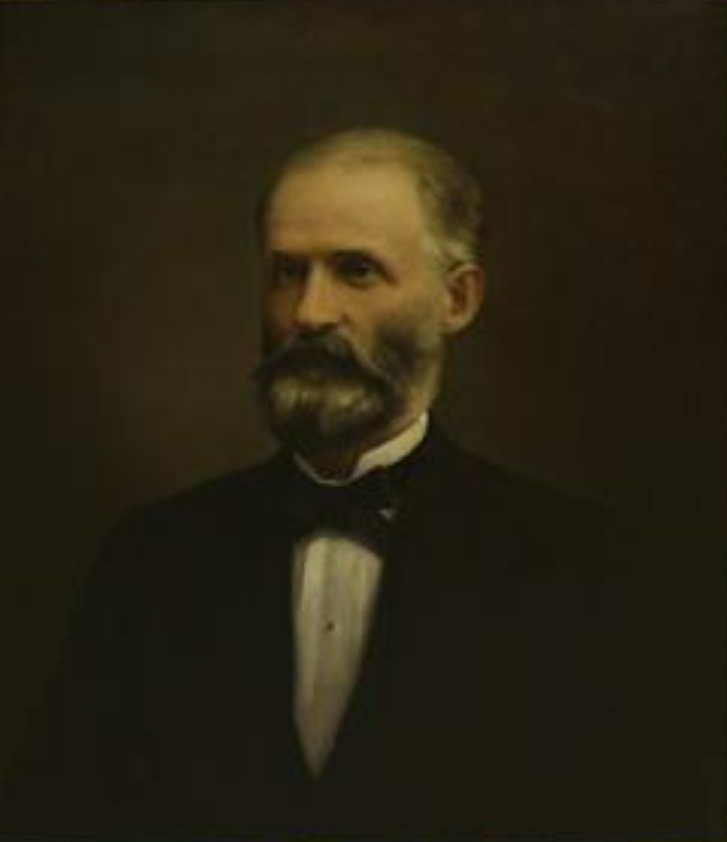
- Portrait by James R. Stuart

14th Governor of Wisconsin
- In office January 7, 1878 – January 2, 1882
- Lieutenant: James M. Bingham
- Preceded by: Harrison Ludington
- Succeeded by: Jeremiah McLain Rusk

5th State Treasurer of Wisconsin
- In office January 1, 1866 – January 3, 1870
- Governor: Lucius Fairchild
- Preceded by: Samuel D. Hastings
- Succeeded by: Henry Baetz

21st Speaker of the Wisconsin Assembly
- In office January 11, 1871 – January 10, 1872
- Preceded by: James M. Bingham
- Succeeded by: Daniel Hall

Member of the Wisconsin Senate
- In office January 13, 1864 – January 1, 1866
- Preceded by: Joel Rich
- Succeeded by: Stoddard Judd
- Constituency: 18th district
- In office January 13, 1858 – January 9, 1860
- Preceded by: S. L. Rose
- Succeeded by: Benjamin Ferguson
- Constituency: 22nd district

Member of the Wisconsin State Assembly
- In office January 11, 1871 – January 10, 1872
- Preceded by: E. Adams Fowler
- Succeeded by: Michael Adams
- Constituency: Dodge 1st district
- In office January 8, 1851 – January 14, 1852
- Preceded by: Malcolm Sellers
- Succeeded by: Horace Patch
- Constituency: Dodge 5th district

Personal details
- Born: June 18, 1824 Inverness, Scotland
- Died: February 13, 1883 (aged 58) Milwaukee, Wisconsin, U.S.
- Resting place: Forest Home Cemetery, Milwaukee
- Party: Republican Party; Whig (before 1854)
- Spouses: Mary Booth; (m. 1849; died 1903)
- Children: Ira B. Smith^{(b. 1852; died 1920)}; Ida (Hinsdale)^{(b. 1854; died 1926)}; Emma J. Smith^{(b. 1855; died 1876)}; Grant Alexander Smith^{(b. 1859; died 1887)}
- Parents: Alexander Smith (father); Sarah (Grant) Smith (mother)
- Profession: merchant, politician

William E. Smith (June 18, 1824 – February 13, 1883) was an American merchant and politician who served as the 14th governor of Wisconsin, the 5th state treasurer of Wisconsin, and the 21st speaker of the Wisconsin State Assembly. He also served four years in the Wisconsin State Senate, representing Dodge County. In business, he was the co-founder of Smith, Roundy & Co., which became the supermarket chain Roundy's.

== Early life ==
Smith was born in Inverness, Scotland, in 1824, the son of Alexander and Sarah (Grant) Smith. He immigrated to the United States with his family as a child, and lived with his family in New York City and Michigan. He attended the common schools before working as a store clerk when he was 17. In 1846 he went to work for Lord & Taylor, and the following year he went to work for a wholesale company. In 1849 he moved to Fox Lake, Wisconsin, to become a partner in a mercantile firm.

== Political career ==
He held several political position in Wisconsin and served two terms in the Wisconsin State Assembly beginning in 1851, including serving as speaker during the second term. Originally a Whig, he helped organize the new Republican Party in 1854. He served two terms in the Wisconsin State Senate from 1858 to 1865. Smith was Wisconsin state treasurer from 1866 to 1870. He was again elected to the State Assembly in 1871. He was a member of the board of regents of normal schools from 1858 to 1876, and director of the state prison from 1874 to 1878.

In 1872, Smith moved to Milwaukee and co-founded the Roundy's supermarket chain. He was elected governor in 1877 and served two terms from 1878 to 1882.

He died on February 13, 1883, in Milwaukee and is interred at Forest Home Cemetery in Milwaukee.

== Family life ==
Smith and his wife Mary Booth were married in Michigan in 1849. They had four children.

== Electoral history ==
=== Wisconsin Assembly (1870) ===
Wisconsin Assembly, Dodge 1st District Election, 1870
Party	Candidate	Votes	%	±%
General Election, November 8, 1870
Republican	William E. Smith	736	56.27%	
Democratic	Ebenezer B. Jones	572	43.73%	
Plurality		164	12.54%	
Total votes		'1,308'	'100.0%'	
Republican hold				

=== Wisconsin Governor (1877, 1879) ===
Wisconsin Gubernatorial Election, 1877
Party	Candidate	Votes	%	±%
General Election, November 6, 1877
Republican	William E. Smith	78,759	44.22%	−5.85%
Democratic	James A. Mallory	70,486	39.57%	−10.00%
Greenback	Edward P. Allis	26,216	14.72%	
Socialist Labor	Collin M. Campbell	2,176	1.22%	
	Scattering	485	0.27%	
Plurality		8,273	4.64%	+4.15%
Total votes		'178,122'	'100.0%'	+4.73%
Republican hold				

Wisconsin Gubernatorial Election, 1879
Party	Candidate	Votes	%	±%
General Election, November 7, 1879
Republican	William E. Smith (incumbent)	100,535	53.19%	+8.98%
Democratic	James Graham Jenkins	75,030	39.70%	+0.13%
Greenback	Reuben May	12,996	6.88%	−7.84%
	Scattering	444	0.23%	
Plurality		25,505	13.49%	+8.85%
Total votes		'189,005'	'100.0%'	+6.11%
Republican hold				

== See also ==
- List of United States governors born outside the United States

Party political offices
Preceded by Harrison Ludington	Republican nominee for Governor of Wisconsin; 1877, 1879	Succeeded by Jeremiah McLain Rusk
Wisconsin Senate
Preceded by Solomon L. Rose	Member of the Wisconsin Senate from the 22nd district 1858 – 1860	Succeeded by Benjamin Ferguson
Preceded by Joel Rich	Member of the Wisconsin Senate from the 18th district 1864 – 1866	Succeeded by Stoddard Judd
Political offices
Preceded by Samuel D. Hastings	State Treasurer of Wisconsin; 1866 – 1870	Succeeded by Henry Baetz
Preceded by James M. Bingham	Speaker of the Wisconsin State Assembly; 1871 – 1872	Succeeded by Daniel Hall
Preceded by Harrison Ludington	Governor of Wisconsin; 1878 – 1882	Succeeded by Jeremiah McLain Rusk
