= Chaseburg, Wisconsin =

- Village
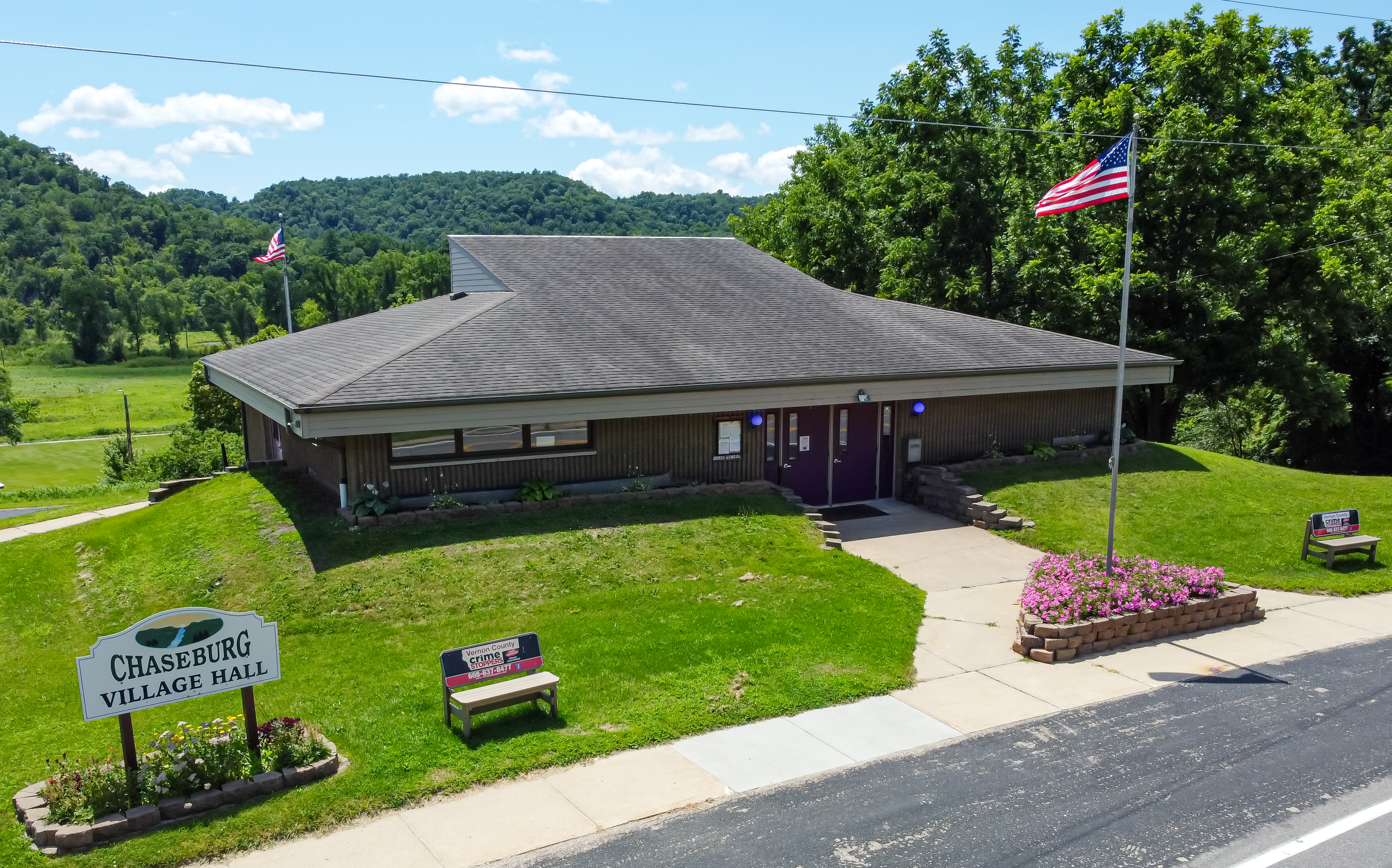
- Village Hall

- Location of Chaseburg in Vernon County, Wisconsin
- Coordinates: 43°39′21″N 91°5′50″W
- Country: United States
- State: Wisconsin
- County: Vernon

Government
  - Mayor: Ken Bluske

Area
  - Total: 0.85 sq mi (2.21 km^{2})
  - Land: 0.84 sq mi (2.18 km^{2})
  - Water: 0.0077 sq mi (0.02 km^{2})
- Elevation: 709 ft (216 m)

Population (2020)
  - Total: 241
  - Density: 286/sq mi (111/km^{2})
- Time zone: UTC-6 (Central (CST))
  - Summer (DST): UTC-5 (CDT)
- Postal code: 54621
- Area code: 608
- FIPS code: 55-14150
- GNIS feature ID: 1562965

Chaseburg (/ˈtʃeɪsbərɡ/ CHAYSS-bərg) is a village in Vernon County, Wisconsin, United States. The population was 241 at the 2020 census.

== Geography ==
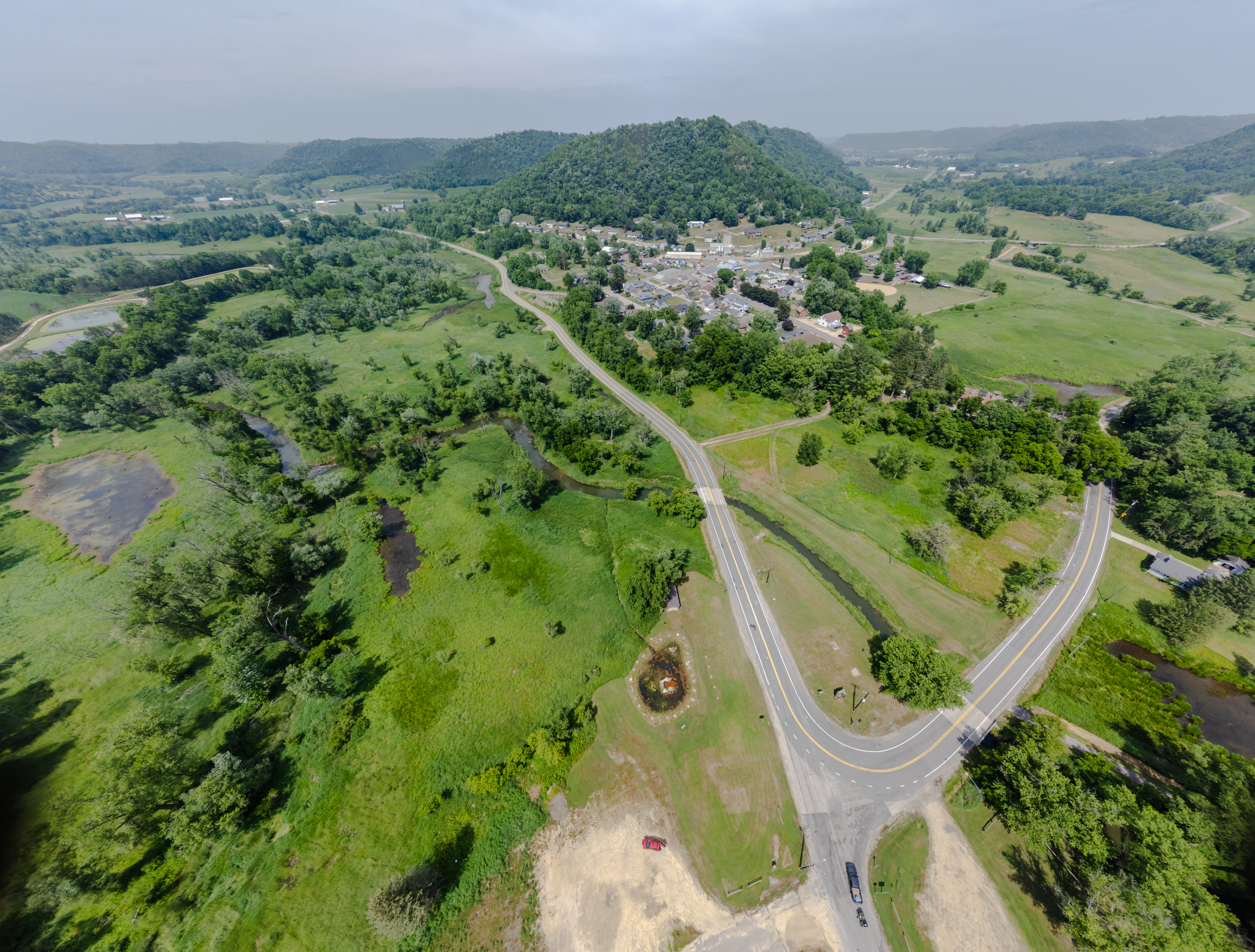

Chaseburg is located at 43°39′21″N 91°5′50″W (43.655890, -91.097095). According to the United States Census Bureau, the village has a total area of 0.93 square miles (2.41 km^{2}), of which 0.92 square miles (2.38 km^{2}) is land and 0.01 square miles (0.03 km^{2}) is water. Chaseburg is split into two distinct sections, upper and lower. Upper Chaseburg is populated by a residential area, a gas station, and a couple of bars. Lower Chaseburg consists of a few homes. Lower Chaseburg has a public grounds area with Tuffy Pond and an open walk space. Before the flood of 2007 lower Chaseburg was a major area of activity. There was a bank, a grocery store, several bars, and more homes.

== Demographics ==
Historical population
Census	Pop.	Note	%±
1880	125		—
1930	218		—
1940	258		18.3%
1950	219		−15.1%
1960	242		10.5%
1970	224		−7.4%
1980	279		24.6%
1990	365		30.8%
2000	306		−16.2%
2010	284		−7.2%
2020	241		−15.1%
U.S. Decennial Census; 2014 Estimate

=== 2010 census ===
As of the census of 2010, there were 284 people, 121 households, and 75 families living in the village. The population density was 308.7 inhabitants per square mile (119.2/km^{2}). There were 126 housing units at an average density of 137.0 per square mile (52.9/km^{2}). The racial makeup of the village was 96.5% White, 0.4% Asian, 1.8% from other races, and 1.4% from two or more races. Hispanic or Latino of any race were 1.8% of the population.

There were 121 households, of which 31.4% had children under the age of 18 living with them, 49.6% were married couples living together, 9.1% had a female householder with no husband present, 3.3% had a male householder with no wife present, and 38.0% were non-families. 32.2% of all households were made up of individuals, and 14.1% had someone living alone who was 65 years of age or older. The average household size was 2.35 and the average family size was 3.00.

The median age in the village was 40.5 years. 25.4% of residents were under the age of 18; 7.6% were between the ages of 18 and 24; 25% were from 25 to 44; 24% were from 45 to 64; and 18% were 65 years of age or older. The gender makeup of the village was 54.2% male and 45.8% female.

=== 2000 census ===
As of the census of 2000, there were 306 people, 133 households, and 80 families living in the village. The population density was 492.4 people per square mile (190.6/km^{2}). There were 146 housing units at an average density of 234.9 per square mile (90.9/km^{2}). The racial makeup of the village was 100.00% White.

There were 133 households, out of which 30.1% had children under the age of 18 living with them, 52.6% were married couples living together, 3.8% had a female householder with no husband present, and 39.8% were non-families. 33.8% of all households were made up of individuals, and 17.3% had someone living alone who was 65 years of age or older. The average household size was 2.30 and the average family size was 2.99.

In the village, the population was spread out, with 25.2% under the age of 18, 6.2% from 18 to 24, 30.1% from 25 to 44, 22.2% from 45 to 64, and 16.3% who were 65 years of age or older. The median age was 37 years. For every 100 females, there were 114.0 males. For every 100 females age 18 and over, there were 108.2 males.

The median income for a household in the village was $38,438, and the median income for a family was $45,417. Males had a median income of $28,125 versus $25,469 for females. The per capita income for the village was $18,851. About 3.8% of families and 7.9% of the population were below the poverty line, including 2.5% of those under the age of eighteen and 20.0% of those 65 or over.

== Notable people ==
- Henry Chase, Wisconsin legislator
- Joseph W. Hoyt, merchant and Wisconsin legislator
