= Henry Chase (1860s politician) =

American politician

Henry Chase was a member of the Wisconsin State Assembly during the 1868 session. A Republican, he represented the 2nd District of Vernon County, Wisconsin. Chaseburg, Wisconsin was named after him. Chase died on March 25, 1871.
