= Battle of Camp Wildcat =

Battle of the American Civil War

- Part of the American Civil War
Date	October 21, 1861
Location	Laurel County, Kentucky
Result	Union victory

Belligerents
United States of America (Union)	(Confederate States of America) CSA (Confederacy)

Commanders and leaders
Albin F. Schoepf	Felix Zollicoffer

Units involved
Camp Wildcat garrison	Zollicoffer's Brigade

Strength
7,000	5,400

Casualties and losses
5 killed 20 wounded	11 killed 42 missing or wounded

- Wildcat Battlefield Site
- U.S. National Register of Historic Places
- Location within Kentucky Location within the United States
- Location: 13.4 miles north of London, Kentucky off U.S. Route 25
- Coordinates: 37°15′43″N 84°12′1″W
- Area: 129 acres (52 ha)
- Built: 1861
- NRHP reference No.: 79001018
- Added to NRHP: June 28, 1979

The Battle of Camp Wildcat (also known as Wildcat Mountain and Camp Wild Cat) was one of the early engagements of the American Civil War (Civil War). It occurred October 21, 1861, in northern Laurel County, Kentucky during the campaign known as the Kentucky Confederate Offensive or Operations in Eastern Kentucky (1861). (Note: This should not be confused with the 1862 Confederate Heartland Offensive or Kentucky Campaign.) The battle is considered one of the first Union victories of the Civil War, and marked the second engagement of troops in the Commonwealth of Kentucky.

== Background ==
=== Kentucky neutrality ===
On April 15, 1861, at the outbreak of the Civil War, President Abraham Lincoln called upon the States remaining in the Union to provide volunteers to suppress the insurrection in the seven States (Note: Alabama, Florida, Georgia, Louisiana, Mississippi, South Carolina and Texas.) which had seceded from the Union by that date. Pro-Confederate Kentucky Governor Beriah Magoffin refused to send troops, but since the majority of the members of the Kentucky General Assembly were pro-Union, Lincoln's call for volunteers did not prompt the State to secede. (Note: Four more States, Arkansas, North Carolina, Tennessee and Virginia, did soon secede.) On May 16, a Kentucky legislative committee recommended that the State remain neutral in the conflict and Governor Magoffin proclaimed the State's neutrality on May 20.

In elections on August 5, 1861, Kentucky voters returned a veto-proof majority of pro-Union members to the House of Representatives and Senate. On August 6, 1861, Camp Dick Robinson, a Union camp, was established near Lexington. On September 2, 1861, the Kentucky General Assembly raised the U.S. flag over the Kentucky State Capitol at Frankfort.

=== Confederate movements ===
On September 3, 1861, Confederate Maj. Gen. Leonidas Polk ordered Brig. Gen. Gideon Pillow to seize Columbus, Kentucky on the Mississippi River before Union forces could do so. This ended Kentucky's neutrality, led to Union Brig. Gen. Ulysses S. Grant's seizure of Paducah, Kentucky on September 6, 1861, and other military movements and actions by both Union and Confederate armies in Kentucky soon afterwards.

Brig. Gen. Felix Zollicoffer's Confederates had moved from Tennessee to push from the Cumberland Gap into central Kentucky in an effort to gain control of that important border state. On September 14, 1861, ten days after his 5,400-man force left their base, Zollicoffer occupied the Cumberland Gap and took a position at the Cumberland Ford (near present-day Pineville, Kentucky) to counter Unionist activity in the area, where Union supporters had been organizing and training recruits from Kentucky and east Tennessee at Camp Andrew Johnson near Barbourville, Kentucky.

=== Battle of Barboursville and aftermath ===
On September 19, 1861, Zollicoffer sent about 800 men under Col. Joel A. Battle against Camp Andrew Johnson, which had largely been vacated, with the Union recruits having moved to nearby Camp Dick Robinson, where several thousand Federal troops were gathered under the command of Brig. Gen. George H. Thomas. As Battle's men approached Camp Johnson, they met a force of 300 pro-Union Home Guards under Capt. Isaac J. Black, who hastily removed the planking from the bridge to prevent the Confederates from crossing it. Sharp skirmishing broke out, but Battle's superior numbers prevailed and Zollicoffer's Confederates drove off Battle's men, with the Union force suffering 1 killed, 1 wounded and 13 captured and the Confederates losing 7 dead. His men seized the camp, destroyed the buildings, and captured the arms and equipment left behind by the retreating recruits. (Note: Historian Larry Daniel writes that the Home Guard had 150 men and that the buildings that were burned were "several houses." Daniel, 2004, p. 22.)

Although Zollicoffer briefly withdrew to his camp at Cumberland Ford (at present-day Pineville, about 11 miles north of Cumberland Gap), he sent a detachment of his men to drive off another Union Home Guard force at a camp at Laurel Bridge, in Laurel County, Kentucky soon after the Battle of Barboursville. On September 28, another Confederate detachment seized 200 barrels of salt and destroyed the Goose Creek Salt Works in Clay County, Kentucky. They returned to camp at Cumberland Ford on September 30. On October 16, Zollicoffer returned to the offensive in an effort to move into central Kentucky.

=== Union Army response ===
In response to Zollicoffer's actions, Union Brig. Gen. Thomas sent troops under Col. Theophilus T. Garrard to set up Camp Wildcat at Rockcastle Hills, near London, Kentucky, at the base of Wildcat Mountain 30 miles (48 km) north of the salt works, in order to secure the ford on the Rockcastle River, and to obstruct the Wilderness Road passing through the area.

Col. Garrard informed Gen. Thomas that if he did not receive reinforcements, he would have to retreat. He reported he was outnumbered seven to one. Thomas sent Brig. Gen. Albin F. Schoepf with what amounted to a brigade of men to Col. Garrard, bringing the total Union force to about 7,000. Schoepf arrived on October 20, 1861, a day before Zollicoffer moved against the camp.

The Union force awaited Zollicoffer's Confederate troops who had to pass the stronghold at Camp Wildcat to proceed into central Kentucky. Zollicoffer was unaware that the camp had been reinforced and further mistook a column of Union reinforcements arriving during the afternoon of October 20 as the entire Union force preparing for battle. Union pickets skirmished with the Confederates on the evening of October 20 and returned to camp to report that a large Confederate force was nearby.

== Order of battle ==
=== Confederate Army ===
Brig. Gen. Felix K. Zollicoffer

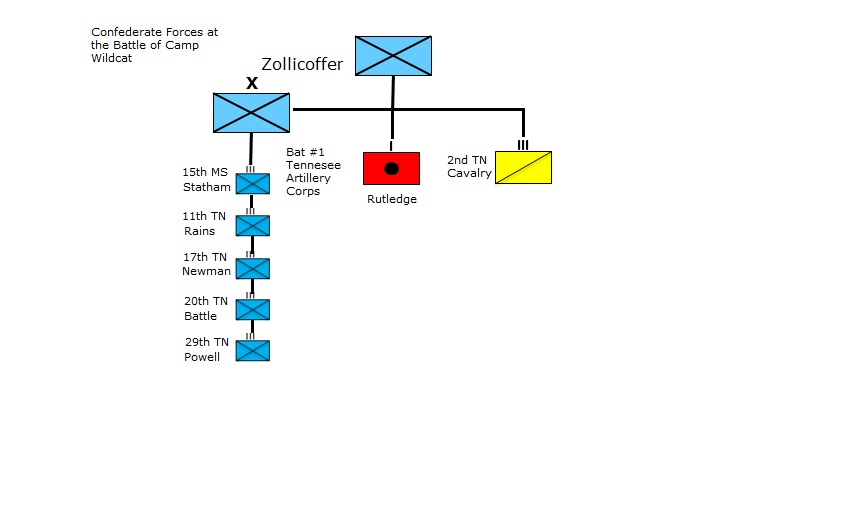
Order of battle of the Confederates at Camp Wildcat

Units
Infantry	15th Mississippi: Col Walter S. Statham; 11th Tennessee: Col James E. Rains; 17th Tennessee: Col Tazewell W. Newman; 20th Tennessee: Col Joel A. Battle; 29th Tennessee: Col Samuel Powell
Artillery	Battery A, Tennessee Artillery Corps: Cpt Arthur M. Rutledge
Cavalry	2nd Tennessee Cavalry Battalion: Ltc Benjamin Branner

=== Union Army ===
BG Albin F. Schoepf
Col Theophilus T. Garrard (in command until the arrival of Schoepf)

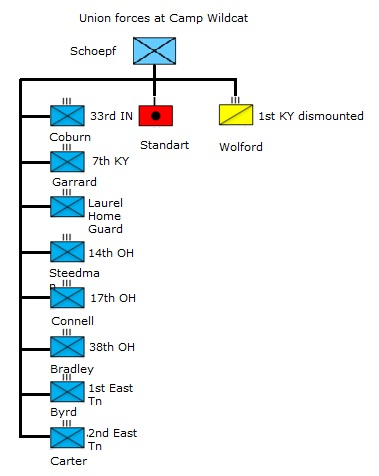
Union order of battle at Camp Wildcat

Units	
Infantry	33rd Indiana: Col John Coburn - 700 men; 7th Kentucky: Col Theophilus T. Garrard - 600 men; Laurel Home Guard - 200 men; 14th Ohio: Col James Blair Steedman - 850 men; 17th Ohio: Col John M. Connell - 850 men; 38th Ohio: Col Edwin D. Bradley - not engaged; 1st East Tennessee: Col Robert K. Byrd - not engaged; 2nd East Tennessee: Col James P.T. Carter - not engaged
Artillery	Battery B, 1st Ohio Light Artillery: Cpt William E. Standart - 150 men
Cavalry	1st Kentucky Cavalry (dismounted): Col Frank Lane Wolford - 450 men

== Battle ==
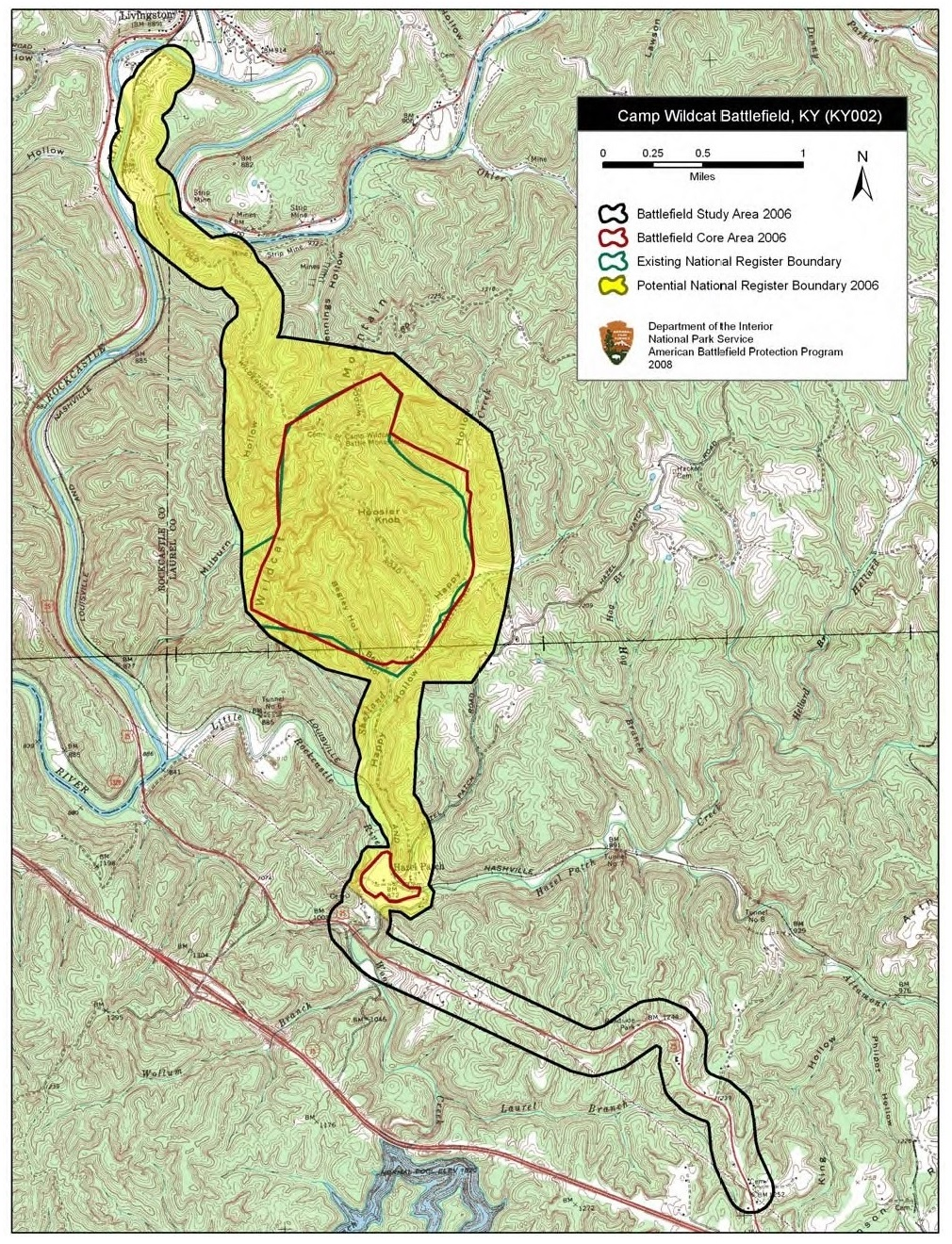
Map of Camp Wildcat Battlefield core and study areas by the American Battlefield Protection Program.

As the Confederates started up the Wilderness Road on the morning of October 21, 1861, Gen. Schoepf moved four companies of the 33rd Indiana Infantry Regiment, 350 men, 0.75 miles (1.21 km) to the east of Camp Wildcat to Round Hill, a steep, high point along the road. Confederate pickets attacked the Union force just after they arrived at Round Hill, but the Confederates soon withdrew to report the situation to Gen. Zollicoffer. Zollicoffer sent most of two regiments, the 11th Tennessee Infantry Regiment and several companies of the 17th Tennessee Infantry Regiment to attack the Union detachment at Round Hill. Just before the attack, the companies from the 33rd Indiana were reinforced by 250 men of the 1st Kentucky Volunteer Cavalry Regiment (U.S.) and a small number of home guards. The Confederate regiments attacked the steep hill but after an hour of fighting the 11th Tennessee Infantry retreated. Soon thereafter Union reinforcements arrived, forcing the 17th Tennessee Infantry to retreat as well.

Zollicoffer then sent the 29th Tennessee Infantry Regiment and several companies of the 17th Tennessee Infantry to attack a location called the South Rim across the road from Round Hill. By then, the Union had fortified this point and the Confederate attack on this point also failed. Later, the Confederates failed to detect a gap between the 33rd Indiana Infantry and the 7th Kentucky Volunteer Infantry Regiment (U.S.) before Col. Garrard sent reinforcements to close it. With casualties mounting to no effect, Zollicoffer ceased attacking the Union position. The Confederates withdrew during the night. They continued their retreat to Cumberland Ford, which they reached on October 26.

== Aftermath ==
Union casualties were 5 killed and 20 wounded while the Confederates suffered 11 killed and 42 wounded or missing.

After Union Army defeats earlier in the year, especially at the Battle of Big Bethel and First Battle of Bull Run, and on the same day at the Battle of Ball's Bluff, a Union victory was welcomed in the North.

In November, the Union force completed the Big Sandy Expedition. This set the stage for the Battle of Mill Springs and the death of Gen. Zollicoffer on January 19, 1862.

== Battlefield ==
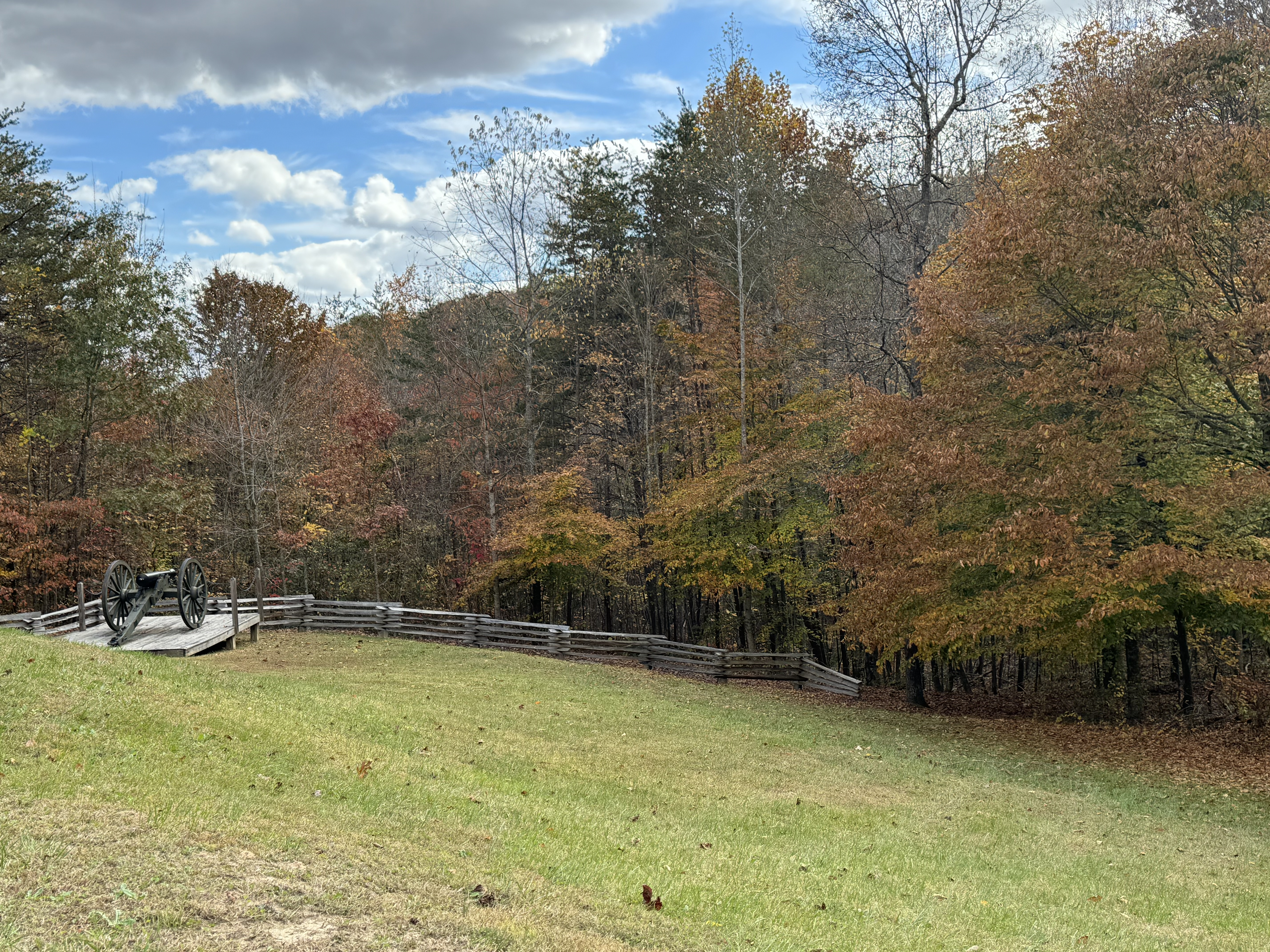
The battlefield in October 2023.

The battlefield, about nine miles northwest of modern-day London, Kentucky, is located on land held by the Daniel Boone National Forest and is in private hands. The Confederate Monument at Crab Orchard miles to the west memorializes some of the Confederates that died at the battle.

Much of the battlefield, almost 130 acres (53 ha), was listed on the National Register of Historic Places in 1979. Another 440 acres (180 ha) area, embracing two sections of the battlefield that had been designated historical archaeological sites, was added to the original designation in 2006. The American Battlefield Trust and its partners have acquired and preserved 264 acres of the battlefield as of mid-2023.

== See also ==
- List of battles fought in Kentucky
