= Robinson Branch (Missouri) =

Stream in the American state of Missouri

Coordinates: 37.850037°N 94.149666°W

Robinson Branch is a stream in Vernon County in the U.S. state of Missouri. It is a tributary of West Fork Clear Creek.

Robinson Branch, previously called "Robinson Creek", has the name of a pioneer citizen.
