= Theophilus T. Garrard =

Politician, Union army American Civil War general, farmer, and businessman (1812–1902)

Theophilus Toulmin Garrard
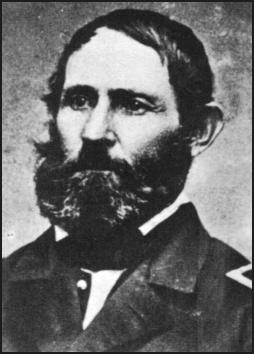
- Brig. Gen. Theophilus T. Garrard
- Born: July 7, 1812; Clay County, Kentucky
- Died: March 15, 1902 (aged 89); Clay County, Kentucky
- Burial place: Garrard Family Cemetery, Garrard, Kentucky
- Military career
- Allegiance: United States of America; Union
- Branch: United States Army; Union Army
- Service years: 1847–1849, 1861–1864
- Rank: Brigadier General
- Commands: Mexican War: Company E, 16th U.S. Infantry; Civil War: 7th Kentucky Infantry Regiment; 1st Brigade, 9th Division, XIII Corps, Army of the Tennessee; District of Somerset, XXIII Corps, Army of the Ohio; Subdistrict of Somerset, District of Kentucky, Department of the Ohio; District of the Clinch, Department of the Ohio
- Conflicts: Mexican-American War; American Civil War; Battle of Camp Wildcat; Battle of Perryville

Theophilus Toulmin Garrard (June 7, 1812 – March 15, 1902) was a politician, Union general in the American Civil War, farmer, and businessman.

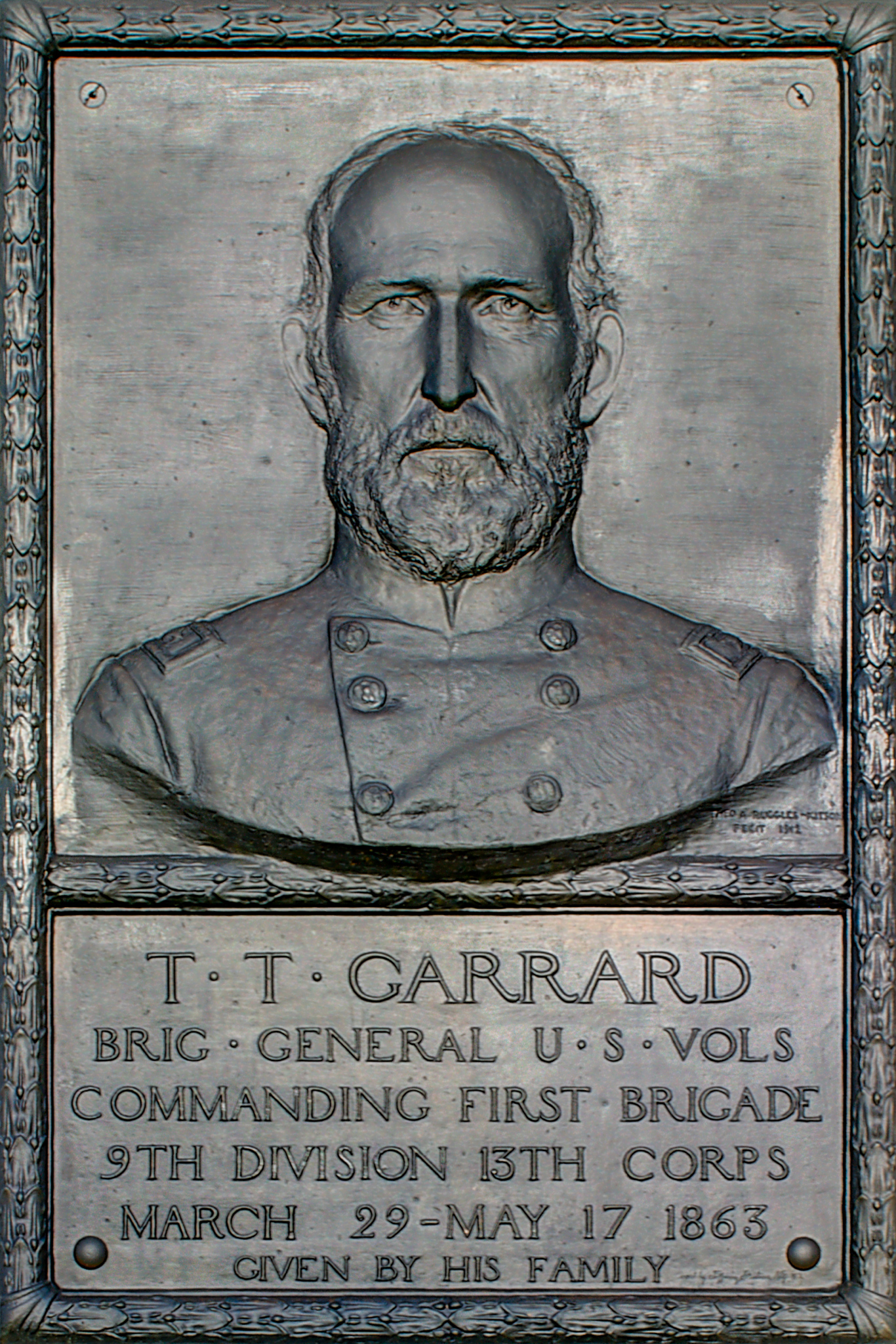
Relief portrait of Garrard at Vicksburg National Military Park

== Early life and career ==
Garrard was born in Clay County, Kentucky near Manchester at the Goose Creek Salt Works (later Union Salt Works) to Colonel Daniel Garrard (1780–1886) and Lucinda Jane Toulmin (1790–1849). He was a grandson of Kentucky Governor James Garrard and cousin of Israel Garrard, Jeptha Garrard, and Kenner Garrard. Garrard attended Centre College in Danville, Kentucky.

On March 26, 1832, Garrard married Nancy Brawner, who died on March 31, just five days after their wedding. He then married Lucinda "Lucy" Burnham Lees on March 9, 1849; together they had eleven children, six boys and five girls.

Garrard ran for office in the Kentucky House of Representatives in 1841 and 1842, but was defeated both times. He ran again in 1843, beating his opponent, General Elijah Combs. He was reelected in 1844 with no opposition.

During the Mexican-American War he served as a captain of Company E, 16th U.S. Infantry, from March 5, 1847, until August 5, 1849, but never saw combat. Four companies, Garrard's included, were stationed at Cerralvo, Mexico on the Rio Grande, with the remaining six companies at Monterrey. Garrard stated, "I think the 8 months I stayed there were the most pleasant part of my life. The Mexicans were fond of us. We had no trouble with them. The climate was pleasant and everything went well."

Garrard left Kentucky in 1849 to seek his fortune in the California Gold Rush, but returned to Kentucky in 1850, not having found a fortune. He won a seat in the Kentucky Senate in 1857 and resigned in 1859 to run for the United States Congress, but was defeated by Green Adams. He was elected again to the Kentucky Senate on August 4, 1861, but declined to serve as he had received his commission as colonel July 27, 1861.

Although a staunch Unionist, Garrard was a slave owner. The 1840 U.S. Census shows that he owned 11 slaves. By 1860, his total worth was $20,000 (over $694,000 in 2007 dollars), and he owned nine slaves, thus making him the sixth-wealthiest citizen of Clay County.

== Civil War ==
At the outbreak of the Civil War, Garrard was authorized to raise a regiment of infantry. He personally recruited eight companies: two from Clay County, two from Laurel County, two from Knox County, and two from Whitley County. Garrard was appointed colonel of the 7th Kentucky Infantry on September 22, 1861.

He commanded the 7th Kentucky Infantry at the Battle of Camp Wildcat, during the Cumberland Gap Campaign, and a detachment of men at the Battle of Perryville from the 7th Kentucky, 32nd Kentucky Infantry, and 3rd Tennessee Infantry who had escaped the Battle of Richmond. Garrard remained with the 7th Kentucky until winter 1862, when he was assigned to the staff of Brigadier General Samuel P. Carter.

Garrard was promoted to brigadier general to date from November 29, 1862, and ordered to report to Major General Benjamin M. Prentiss at Helena, Arkansas. While at Milliken's Bend, Louisiana, near the end of March 1863, Garrard lost central vision in his left eye. His attending surgeon suggested that he had some "obscure disease" behind the eye and advised Garrard to see another physician. Garrard reported to the Union Army medical director at Cincinnati in July 1863. The surgeon there determined he had a rupture within the eye and that it was incurable. Garrard remained at Cincinnati until leaving for Memphis on September 12, 1863.

Garrard was assigned command of the District of Somerset, which included four other nearby towns, August 1863-January 17, 1864; this command was broken into the Subdistrict of Somerset, which he also commanded November 6-December 1863. On January 17, 1864, he was placed in command of the District of the Clinch, a mixed brigade of infantry and cavalry, posted at Cumberland Gap. His primary responsibilities included supervision of the construction of military roads within his jurisdiction.

Garrard was honorably mustered out of the service on April 4, 1864, due to his vision issues. He returned to his home in Clay County, where he farmed and operated the salt works. Pension records indicate that he had lost complete sight in his left eye and nearly all in his right eye.

== Later life ==
Garrard spent the remainder of his life in Clay County farming and operating the Union Salt Works, which he rebuilt after they were burned by Union soldiers during the war to prevent their use by Confederate forces. He died on March 15, 1902, in the same home in which he was born. Garrard is buried in the Garrard Family Cemetery at Garrard, Kentucky.

== Honors ==
The Brigadier General Theophilus T. Garrard Camp #4, Sons of Union Veterans of the Civil War is named in his honor.

== See also ==
- List of American Civil War generals (Union)
