= 1879 Wisconsin gubernatorial election =

- November 4, 1879
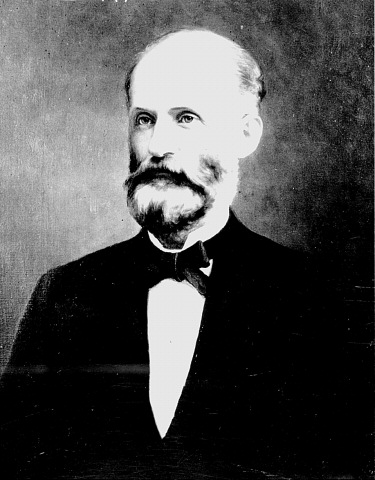

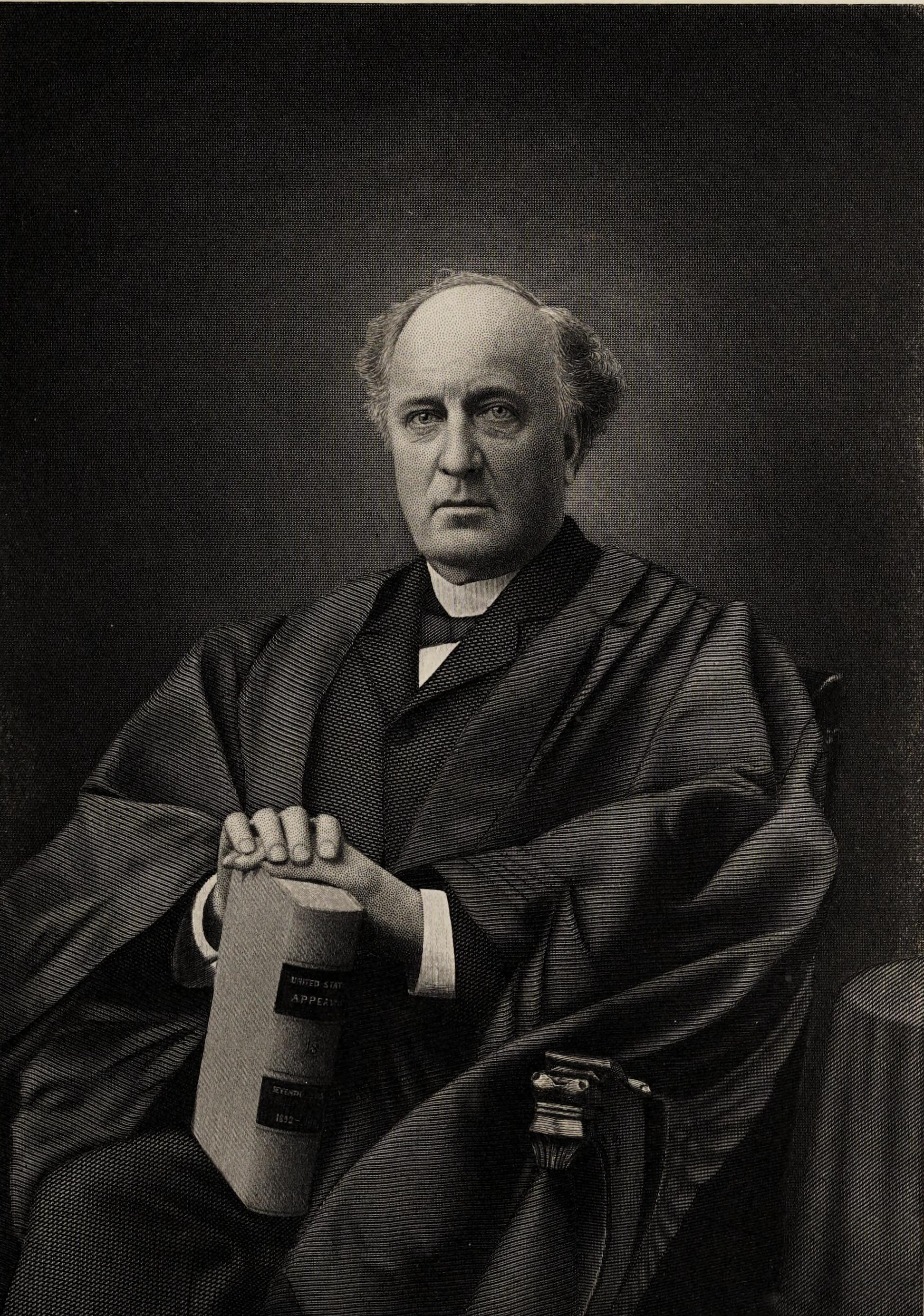

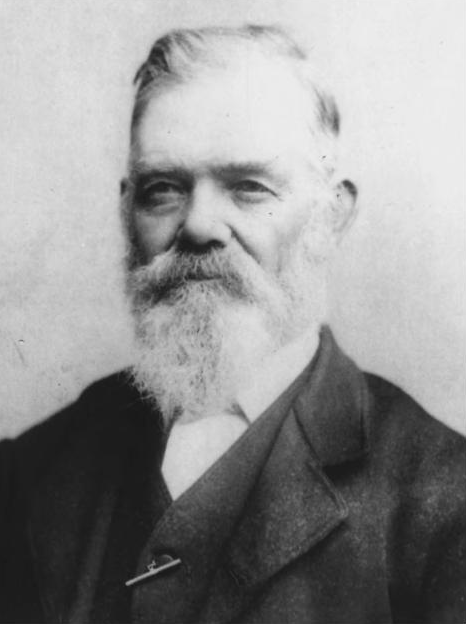
Nominee	William E. Smith	James Graham Jenkins	Reuben May
Party	Republican	Democratic	Greenback
Popular vote	100,535	75,030	26,216
Percentage	53.19%	39.70%	6.88%
- County results Smith : 30–40% 40–50% 50–60% 60–70% 70–80% 80–90% >90% Jenkins : 40–50% 50–60% 60–70% 70–80%
Governor before election
William E. Smith
Republican
Elected Governor
William E. Smith
Republican

The 1879 Wisconsin gubernatorial election was held on November 4, 1879. Incumbent Republican Governor William E. Smith ran for re-election to a second term. The Democratic convention initially nominated Alexander Mitchell for Governor, but Mitchell declined the nomination; in his place, Milwaukee attorney James Graham Jenkins received the nomination. Smith and Jenkins also faced a Greenback candidate and a nominee from the nascent Prohibition Party in the general election. Smith ultimately won re-election in a landslide, winning 53% of the vote to Jenkins's 40%. Reuben May, the Greenback nominee, received only 7% of the vote, a significant erosion from the Party's 15% in 1877.

== Results ==
1879 Wisconsin gubernatorial election
Party	Candidate	Votes	%	±%
Republican	William E. Smith (inc.)	100,535	53.19%	+8.98%
Democratic	James G. Jenkins	75,030	39.70%	+0.13%
Greenback	Reuben May	12,996	6.88%	−7.84%
Prohibition	W. R. Bloomfield	387	0.20%	−0.02%
	Scattering	57	0.03%	
Majority		25,505	13.49%	
Total votes		189,005	100.00%	
Republican hold		Swing	+8.85%	

=== Results by county ===
Smith was the first Republican to ever carry Milwaukee County. Participating in its first election, Marinette County voted for Smith and would continue to vote for the statewide winner in every election until 1932. After voting for Jenkins in this election, Shawano County would not back the losing candidate again until 1942.

County	William E. Smith Republican		James G. Jenkins Democratic		Reuben May Greenback		W. R. Bloomfield Prohibition		Scattering Write-in		Margin		Total votes cast
County	#	%	#	%	#	%	#	%	#	%	#	%	Total votes cast
Adams	688	71.97%	201	21.03%	67	7.01%	0	0.00%	0	0.00%	487	50.94%	956
Ashland	177	61.03%	113	38.97%	0	0.00%	0	0.00%	0	0.00%	64	22.07%	290
Barron	709	71.47%	280	28.23%	2	0.20%	0	0.00%	1	0.10%	429	43.25%	992
Bayfield	83	73.45%	30	26.55%	0	0.00%	0	0.00%	0	0.00%	53	46.90%	113
Brown	2,030	46.15%	2,250	51.15%	117	2.66%	0	0.00%	2	0.05%	-220	-5.00%	4,399
Buffalo	1,324	61.58%	815	37.91%	11	0.51%	0	0.00%	0	0.00%	509	23.67%	2,150
Burnett	387	94.62%	22	5.38%	0	0.00%	0	0.00%	0	0.00%	365	89.24%	409
Calumet	777	30.75%	1,519	60.11%	215	8.51%	15	0.59%	1	0.04%	-742	-29.36%	2,527
Chippewa	816	46.00%	785	44.25%	172	9.70%	0	0.00%	1	0.06%	31	1.75%	1,774
Clark	1,005	66.87%	347	23.09%	151	10.05%	0	0.00%	0	0.00%	658	43.78%	1,503
Columbia	2,762	60.49%	1,673	36.64%	126	2.76%	5	0.11%	0	0.00%	1,089	23.85%	4,566
Crawford	938	46.74%	755	37.62%	314	15.65%	0	0.00%	0	0.00%	183	9.12%	2,007
Dane	4,623	50.21%	4,072	44.22%	501	5.44%	6	0.07%	6	0.07%	551	5.98%	9,208
Dodge	2,670	37.44%	4,139	58.03%	309	4.33%	13	0.18%	1	0.01%	-1,469	-20.60%	7,132
Door	613	59.86%	94	9.18%	315	30.76%	0	0.00%	2	0.20%	298 (Note: Smith's margin over May)	29.10%	1,024
Douglas	39	61.90%	24	38.10%	0	0.00%	0	0.00%	0	0.00%	15	23.81%	63
Dunn	1,356	68.48%	621	31.36%	3	0.15%	0	0.00%	0	0.00%	735	37.12%	1,980
Eau Claire	1,488	58.15%	1,031	40.29%	39	1.52%	0	0.00%	1	0.04%	457	17.86%	2,559
Fond du Lac	3,584	44.65%	3,834	47.76%	583	7.26%	24	0.30%	2	0.02%	-250	-3.11%	8,027
Grant	3,111	57.18%	1,703	31.30%	625	11.49%	0	0.00%	2	0.04%	1,408	25.88%	5,441
Green	2,000	57.69%	1,104	31.84%	361	10.41%	0	0.00%	2	0.06%	896	25.84%	3,467
Green Lake	1,092	52.98%	637	30.91%	332	16.11%	0	0.00%	0	0.00%	455	22.08%	2,061
Iowa	1,775	50.31%	1,447	41.01%	305	8.65%	0	0.00%	1	0.03%	328	9.30%	3,528
Jackson	1,836	75.84%	387	15.99%	192	7.93%	6	0.25%	0	0.00%	1,449	59.85%	2,421
Jefferson	2,301	43.62%	2,760	52.32%	210	3.98%	0	0.00%	4	0.08%	-459	-8.70%	5,275
Juneau	1,227	51.79%	926	39.09%	216	9.12%	0	0.00%	0	0.00%	301	12.71%	2,369
Kenosha	1,180	54.60%	966	44.70%	15	0.69%	0	0.00%	0	0.00%	214	9.90%	2,161
Kewaunee	254	22.18%	888	77.55%	3	0.26%	0	0.00%	0	0.00%	-634	-55.37%	1,145
La Crosse	2,234	56.16%	910	22.88%	799	20.09%	35	0.88%	0	0.00%	1,324	33.28%	3,978
Lafayette	1,673	48.98%	1,619	47.39%	115	3.37%	9	0.26%	0	0.00%	54	1.58%	3,416
Lincoln	172	63.70%	49	18.15%	49	18.15%	0	0.00%	0	0.00%	123	45.56%	270
Manitowoc	1,898	40.98%	2,728	58.91%	5	0.11%	0	0.00%	0	0.00%	-830	-17.92%	4,631
Marathon	661	28.94%	1,334	58.41%	289	12.65%	0	0.00%	0	0.00%	-673	-29.47%	2,284
Marinette	978	79.64%	248	20.20%	0	0.00%	2	0.16%	0	0.00%	730	59.45%	1,228
Marquette	614	43.55%	747	52.98%	41	2.91%	7	0.50%	1	0.07%	-133	-9.43%	1,410
Milwaukee	8,682	57.19%	6,410	42.22%	89	0.59%	0	0.00%	0	0.00%	2,272	14.97%	15,181
Monroe	1,862	57.31%	992	30.53%	395	12.16%	0	0.00%	0	0.00%	870	26.78%	3,249
Oconto	867	56.26%	673	43.67%	1	0.06%	0	0.00%	0	0.00%	194	12.59%	1,541
Outagamie	1,298	30.88%	2,500	59.48%	405	9.64%	0	0.00%	0	0.00%	-1,202	-28.60%	4,203
Ozaukee	519	23.33%	1,485	66.74%	220	9.89%	0	0.00%	1	0.04%	-966	-43.42%	2,225
Pepin	629	77.85%	177	21.91%	2	0.25%	0	0.00%	0	0.00%	452	55.94%	808
Pierce	1,514	69.71%	335	15.42%	318	14.64%	0	0.00%	5	0.23%	1,179	54.28%	2,172
Polk	1,196	79.79%	303	20.21%	0	0.00%	0	0.00%	0	0.00%	893	59.57%	1,499
Portage	1,420	51.64%	1,218	44.29%	98	3.56%	13	0.47%	1	0.04%	202	7.35%	2,750
Price	39	31.97%	81	66.39%	2	1.64%	0	0.00%	0	0.00%	-42	-34.43%	122
Racine	2,547	56.57%	1,766	39.23%	164	3.64%	25	0.56%	0	0.00%	781	17.35%	4,502
Richland	1,713	62.91%	580	21.30%	428	15.72%	0	0.00%	2	0.07%	1,133	41.61%	2,723
Rock	4,169	68.80%	1,600	26.40%	218	3.60%	69	1.14%	4	0.07%	2,569	42.39%	6,060
Sauk	2,387	64.65%	917	24.84%	384	10.40%	4	0.11%	0	0.00%	1,470	39.82%	3,692
Shawano	515	41.97%	699	56.97%	13	1.06%	0	0.00%	0	0.00%	-184	-15.00%	1,227
Sheboygan	2,113	42.61%	2,130	42.95%	714	14.40%	0	0.00%	2	0.04%	-17	-0.34%	4,959
St. Croix	1,846	55.94%	1,383	41.91%	12	0.36%	59	1.79%	0	0.00%	463	14.03%	3,300
Taylor	296	53.53%	256	46.29%	1	0.18%	0	0.00%	0	0.00%	40	7.23%	553
Trempealeau	1,697	70.77%	301	12.55%	371	15.47%	28	1.17%	1	0.04%	1,326	55.30%	2,398
Vernon	2,092	65.83%	377	11.86%	707	22.25%	0	0.00%	2	0.06%	1,385	43.58%	3,178
Walworth	3,286	73.78%	1,095	24.58%	55	1.23%	17	0.38%	1	0.02%	2,191	49.19%	4,454
Washington	1,277	35.88%	2,190	61.53%	86	2.42%	6	0.17%	0	0.00%	-913	-25.65%	3,559
Waukesha	2,574	49.20%	2,468	47.17%	190	3.63%	0	0.00%	0	0.00%	106	2.03%	5,232
Waupaca	1,830	57.31%	1,053	32.98%	299	9.36%	11	0.34%	0	0.00%	777	24.33%	3,193
Waushara	1,487	83.73%	169	9.52%	112	6.31%	0	0.00%	8	0.45%	1,318	74.21%	1,776
Winnebago	3,086	48.32%	2,439	38.19%	827	12.95%	33	0.52%	2	0.03%	647	10.13%	6,387
Wood	519	39.98%	375	28.89%	403	31.05%	0	0.00%	1	0.08%	116	9.93%	1,298
Total	100,535	53.19%	75,030	39.70%	12,996	6.88%	387	0.20%	57	0.03%	25,505	13.49%	189,005

==== Counties that flipped from Democratic to Republican ====
- Ashland
- Chippewa
- Crawford
- Dane
- Douglas
- Green Lake
- Milwaukee
- Taylor
- Winnebago

==== Counties that flipped from Greenback to Republican ====
- Clark
- Lincoln
- Wood

== Bibliography ==
- Nesbit, Robert C. (1985). Thompson, William Fletcher (ed.). The History of Wisconsin: Urbanization and Industrialization, 1873-1893. Vol. 3. Madison, Wis.: State Historical Society of Wisconsin. ISBN 0-87020-122-0.
