= George W. Monroe =

American general (1835–1869)

George Wood Monroe
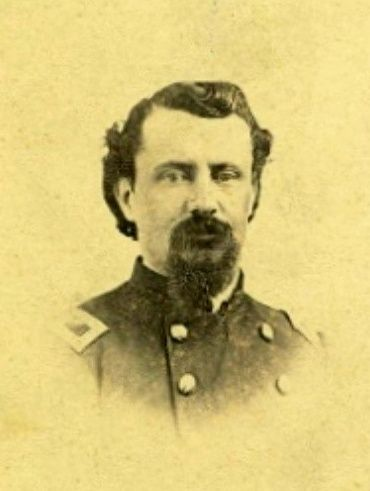
- Born: June 3, 1835; Columbia, Kentucky, U.S.
- Died: September 22, 1869 (aged 34); Frankfort, Kentucky, U.S.
- Burial place: Frankfort Cemetery, Frankfort, Kentucky, U.S.
- Military career
- Allegiance: United States (Union)
- Branch: United States Army (Union Army)
- Service years: 1862 – 1868
- Commands: 22nd Kentucky Infantry Regiment; 7th Kentucky Veteran Infantry Regiment
- Conflicts: American Civil War: Offensive in Eastern Kentucky; Battle of Middle Creek; Confederate Heartland Offensive; Battle of the Cumberland Gap; Vicksburg campaign; Battle of Chickasaw Bayou (WIA); Battle of Arkansas Post; Battle of Port Gibson; Battle of Champion Hill; Battle of Big Black River Bridge

George Wood Monroe (1835–1869) was an American Brevet Brigadier General who participated in the American Civil War. He commanded the 22nd Kentucky Infantry Regiment during the war as well as the 7th Kentucky Infantry Regiment after the war. Monroe also led the 22nd Kentucky throughout several major battles of the Vicksburg campaign.

== Early years ==
Monroe was born on June 3, 1835, at Columbia, Kentucky, as the sixth son of Judge Benjamin Monroe and Cynthia Montgomery Monroe. He grew up in Frankfort and attended public schools there. Owing to his father's career as a judge, Monroe managed to become an attorney during the 1850s.

== American Civil War ==
On December 12, 1861, Monroe enlisted into the 22nd Kentucky Infantry Regiment as a lieutenant colonel of Company A as some men in the company were Monroe's personal friends from Frankfort. Monroe first saw active combat at the same day at the Battle of Middle Creek and he was praised as one report by James A. Garfield stated that Monroe was the “determinate of the day.” Monroe and the 22nd Kentucky then accompanied George W. Morgan in the Battle of the Cumberland Gap and accompanied William Tecumseh Sherman in the Battle of Chickasaw Bayou as Monroe himself got wounded slightly in the neck during the battle.

Monroe and the 22nd Kentucky went on to participate in Ulysses S. Grant's Vicksburg campaign as they saw service at Arkansas Post, Battle of Port Gibson, Champion Hill, Big Black River Bridge and various other battles. Monroe was promoted to colonel on December 12, 1863, and was given command of the regiment. In March 1864, at Baton Rouge, Louisiana, the 7th, 9th and 22nd Kentucky Infantry Regiments were merged into the 7th Kentucky Veteran Regiment as Monroe was given command of the regiment as they remained stationed at Baton Rouge. On March 18, 1865, President Abraham Lincoln himself brevetted Monroe to Brigadier General for "gallant and meritorious services during the war" and for the Union cause.

Monroe continued to serve in the United States Army after the war as Kentucky's Quartermaster General until September 1868 when he was forced to resign due to sickness and died on September 22, 1869, and was buried at Frankfort Cemetery.

== See also ==
- List of American Civil War brevet generals (Union)
