= Robinson Creek (Shelby Creek tributary) =

Coordinates: 37.3853811°N 82.5440422°W

Robinson Creek is a stream located within Pike County, Kentucky. It is a tributary of Shelby Creek.

Robinson Creek is named after Joseph Robinson, who settled near it.

== See also ==
- List of rivers of Kentucky
