= Sinking Creek =

Sinking Creek may refer to:

- Sinking Creek (Breckinridge County, Kentucky), a tributary of the Ohio River
- Sinking Creek (Jessamine County, Kentucky)
- Sinking Creek (Current River), a stream in Missouri
- Sinking Creek (Turnback Creek), a stream in Missouri
- Sinking Creek (Pennsylvania), a tributary of Penns Creek
- Sinking Creek (Clinch River), a river in Virginia
- Sinking Creek (New River), a river in Virginia
- Sinking Creek (Washington), a stream in Lincoln County
