= Defeated =

Defeated may refer to:

- "Defeated" (Breaking Benjamin song)
- "Defeated" (Anastacia song)
- "Defeated", a song by Snoop Dogg from the album Bible of Love
- Defeated, Tennessee, an unincorporated community
- The Defeated a 2021 Netflix series about postwar Berlin

== See also ==
- Defeat (disambiguation)
- Defeated Creek (disambiguation)
