= Hell for Certain =

Hell for Certain may refer to:

- Hell for Certain, Kentucky, a creek fork of the Middle Fork Kentucky River
- Hell for Certain Branch, a stream in West Virginia
