= Kentucky River Museum =

Museum located in Boonesborough, Kentucky

- Established: 2002
- Location: Boonesborough, Kentucky
- Coordinates: 37°53′45″N 84°15′57″W
- Website: Official website

The Kentucky River Museum is located in Boonesborough, Kentucky, in Fort Boonesborough State Park.

Established in 2002, the museum occupies the former lock operator's home and storage and maintenance building for Lock 10, one of fourteen locks on the Kentucky River which were originally built by the U.S. Army Corps of Engineers. The ten uppermost ones (locks 5 through 14) are now operated by the Kentucky River Authority.
