= Defeated Creek =

Defeated Creek may refer to:

== Streams ==
- Defeated Creek (Hickman County, Tennessee), a stream
- Defeated Creek (Knott County, Kentucky), a tributary to Carr Creek Lake
- Defeated Creek (Letcher County, Kentucky), a stream
- Defeated Creek (Smith County, Tennessee), a tributary to Cordell Hull Lake

== Populated place ==
- Defeated Creek, Kentucky, an unincorporated community in Letcher County
