= List of rivers of Kentucky =

List of rivers in Kentucky (U.S. state).

== By drainage basin ==
This list is arranged by drainage basin, with respective tributaries indented under each larger stream's name. All rivers in Kentucky flow to the Mississippi River, nearly all by virtue of flowing to its major tributary, the Ohio River. Also listed are some important tributaries to the few Kentucky rivers that originate in, or flow through, other states.

- Mississippi River
  - Obion Creek
  - Mayfield Creek
  - Ohio River
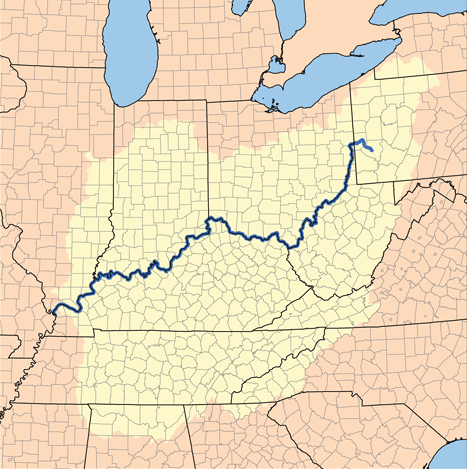
    Ohio River Drainage Basin
    - Goose Creek
    - Massac Creek
    - Tennessee River
      - Clarks River
      - Blood River
    - Cumberland River
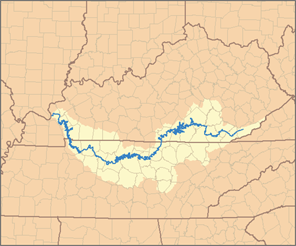
      Cumberland River Drainage Basin
      - Little River
      - Red River
      - Obey River (Tennessee)
        - Wolf River
      - Big South Fork of the Cumberland River
      - Rockcastle River
        - No Business Branch
      - Laurel River
      - Clear Fork
    - Tradewater River
    - Green River
      - Panther Creek
      - Pond River
      - Rough River
      - Mud River
      - Barren River
        - Gasper River
      - Little Reedy Creek
      - Big Reedy Creek
      - Bear Creek
      - Nolin River
      - Little Barren River
      - Russell Creek
    - Salt River
      - Rolling Fork
        - Beech Fork
          - Chaplin River
      - Floyds Fork
        - Brooks Spring/Brooks Run
        - Cedar Creek
          - Tanyard Branch
    - Beargrass Creek
    - Little Kentucky River
    - Kentucky River
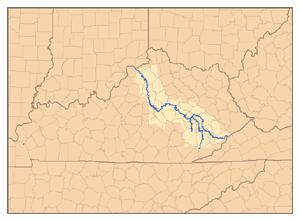
      Kentucky River Drainage Basin
      - Eagle Creek
      - Elkhorn Creek
      - Benson Creek
      - Dix River
        - Cedar Creek
      - Hickman Creek
      - Silver Creek
      - Red River
      - North Fork Kentucky River
        - Troublesome Creek
          - Lost Creek
          - Buckhorn Creek
          - Balls Fork
          - The Forks of Troublesome
        - Willard Creek
        - North Fork tributaries at Hazard, Kentucky
          - Lotts Creek
            - Trace Fork
          - Big Creek
        - Carr Fork
        - Macies Creek
        - Leatherwood Creek
      - Middle Fork Kentucky River
        - Cutshin Creek
        - Greasy Creek
        - Beech Fork
      - South Fork Kentucky River
        - Sextons Creek
        - Goose Creek
          - Little Goose Creek
          - Horse Creek
          - Laurel Creek
          - Collins Creek
          - Martins Creek
          - Beech Creek
        - Red Bird River
          - Big Creek
          - Bear Creek
    - Woolper Creek
    - Taylors Creek
    - Elijahs Creek
    - Licking River
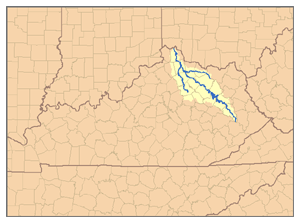
      Licking River Drainage Basin
      - Banklick Creek
      - Slate Creek
        - Stepstone Creek
      - South Fork Licking River
        - Townsend Creek
      - North Fork Licking River
    - Kinniconick Creek
    - Tygarts Creek
    - Little Sandy River
    - Big Sandy River
      - Blaine Creek
      - Levisa Fork
        - Paint Creek
        - Russell Fork
      - Tug Fork
        - Blackberry Creek

== Alphabetically ==
- Banklick Creek
- Barren River
- Beargrass Creek
- Beaver Creek (Kentucky)
- Beech Fork of the Salt River
- Betty Troublesome Creek
- Big Sandy River
- Blackberry Creek
- Blood River
- Cassidy Creek
- Cedar Creek
- Chaplin River
- Clarks River
- Clear Creek (Kentucky)
- Clear Fork
- Cruises Creek
- Cumberland River
- Defeated Creek (Knott County, Kentucky)
- Defeated Creek (Letcher County, Kentucky)
- Dix River
- Dreaming Creek
- Dry Creek (Kentucky)
- Drennon Creek
- Eddy Creek
- Elijahs Creek
- Elkhorn Creek
- Floyds Fork of the Salt River
- Gasper River
- Green River
- Hickman Creek
- Kentucky River
- Laurel River
- Lawrence Creek (Kentucky)
- Levisa Fork of the Big Sandy River
- Licking River
- Little Barren River
- Little Kentucky River
- Little River
- Little Sandy River
- Lynn Camp Creek
- Massac Creek
- Middle Fork Kentucky River
- Mississippi River
- Mistaken Creek
- Mud River
- Nolin River
- North Fork Kentucky River
- Ohio River
- Paint Creek
- Pond River
- Red Bird River
- Red River (eastern Kentucky)
- Red River (western Kentucky)
- Rockcastle River
- Rolling Fork of the Salt River
- Rough River
- Russell Fork of the Big Sandy River
- Salt Lick Creek (Kentucky)
- Salt River
- Sap Branch
- Silver Creek
- Sinking Creek (Breckinridge County, Kentucky)
- Sinking Creek (Jessamine County, Kentucky)
- South Fork Kentucky River
- Squabble Creek
- Stepstone Creek
- Tearcoat Creek
- Tennessee River
- Tradewater River
- Tug Fork of the Big Sandy River
- Tygarts Creek
- Wolf River
- Woolper Creek

== See also ==
- List of rivers in the United States
