= Squabble Creek =

Squabble Creek may refer to:

- Squabble Creek (Kentucky)
- Squabble Creek (Texas)
