= Squabble =

Squabble may refer to:

- Brouhaha, or minor altercation
- Controversy
- Squabble (video game), a battle royale-based Wordle-type game
- Squabble Creek (Kentucky)
- Squabble Creek (Texas)
- "The Tale of How Ivan Ivanovich Quarreled with Ivan Nikiforovich", a tale known as "The Squabble" in English
