= Whitley Branch (Kentucky) =

Creek in London, Kentucky

- Location of the stream in Kentucky
- Etymology: William Whitley

Physical characteristics
- Source: Daniel Boone National Forest
  - location: London, Kentucky
  - coordinates: 37°07′06″N 84°04′54″W
- Mouth: Little Laurel River
  - location: Corbin, Kentucky
  - coordinates: 37°06′06″N 84°03′19″W
- Basin size: 2.6 sq mi (6.7 km^{2})

Basin features
- River system: Cumberland River

Whitley Branch is a perennial headwater stream, part of the Cumberland River system, located in London, Kentucky, that drains an urban area of approximately 2.6 square miles (6.7 km^{2}). It begins south of London, in the Daniel Boone National Forest area, passes through Laurel County, and joins Little Laurel River just north of Corbin, Kentucky.

== Overview ==
Whitley Branch likely got its name from Colonel William Whitley, a prominent historical figure in Kentucky's early history. The creek was likely named after him in honor of famously protecting the settlers along Wilderness Road.

Whitley Branch serves as London's water drainage and is a feature of the Whitley Branch Veterans Park, running alongside the walkways, under bridges, and shaping the landscape. Because of runoff, the steam is a major source of pollutants and sediment. Restoration efforts have included planting native trees to restore the habitat and raise awareness. The City of London has also undergone a project to restore the Whitley Branch Wetlands to its original condition. The goal is to preserve the natural environment while allowing locals to enjoy recreational activities.
