= Sap Branch =

Stream in Fleming County, Kentucky, U.S.

Coordinates: 38.3478545°N 83.8571444°W

Sap Branch is a stream in Fleming County, Kentucky, in the United States. It is a tributary of the Licking River.

A variant name is Battle Run. The original name of Battle Run commemorates a skirmish in 1791 between Indians and white settlers near the stream.

== See also ==
- List of rivers of Kentucky
