= Saltlick Creek =

Saltlick Creek or Salt Lick Creek may refer to:

- Salt Lick Creek (Kentucky)
- Saltlick Creek (Cheat River), a tributary of the Cheat River in West Virginia
- Saltlick Creek (Little Kanawha River), a tributary of the Little Kanawha River in West Virginia
- Salt Lick Creek (Susquehanna River), a tributary of the Susquehanna River in Pennsylvania
