= Cedar Creek (Dix River tributary) =

Coordinates: 37.5014705°N 84.5468831°W

Cedar Creek, located in Lincoln County in south-central Kentucky, USA, is an 8-mile-long (13 km) tributary to the Dix River. Via the Dix, Kentucky and Ohio rivers, it is part of the Mississippi River watershed. In 2002, a section of Cedar Creek was impounded to form Cedar Creek Lake.

== See also ==
- List of rivers of Kentucky
