= Bachelors Rest, Kentucky =

Unincorporated community in Kentucky, United States

Bachelors Rest
- Unincorporated community
- Location within the state of Kentucky Bachelors Rest (the United States)
- Coordinates: 38°38′41″N 84°14′9″W
- Country: United States
- State: Kentucky
- County: Pendleton
- Elevation: 922 ft (281 m)
- Time zone: UTC-5 (Eastern (EST))
  - Summer (DST): UTC-4 (EST)
- GNIS feature ID: 507432

Bachelors Rest is an unincorporated community located in Pendleton County, Kentucky, United States.

According to tradition, the community was so named for the bachelors who would congregate and socialize at the local country store.
