= Cedar Creek Lake =

Cedar Creek Lake may refer to:

- Cedar Creek Lake (Kentucky)
- Cedar Creek Reservoir (Texas)
