= Cruises Creek =

Stream in Boone and Kenton County, Kentucky, U.S.

Coordinates: 38.8520099°N 84.4641063°W

Cruises Creek is a stream in Boone and Kenton counties, Kentucky, in the United States. It is a tributary of the Licking River.

Cruise Creek was named for Captain Cruise, an explorer who was killed near the stream in 1784.

== See also ==
- List of rivers of Kentucky
