= Little Kentucky River =

Coordinates: 38.6861733°N 85.2021762°W

The Little Kentucky River is a tributary of the Ohio River, approximately 37 miles (60 km) long, in northern Kentucky in the United States.

It rises in southwestern Henry County, approximately 30 miles (48 km) northeast of Louisville. It follows a winding course generally north across Trimble and Carroll counties. It joins the Ohio 2 miles (3 km) west of Carrollton, and approximately 1 mile (1.6 km) west of the mouth of the Kentucky River.

== See also ==
- List of rivers of Kentucky
