= Hickman Creek =

River in the United States of America

Coordinates: 37.7681347°N 84.6129975°W

Hickman Creek is approximately 22 square mile tributary of the Kentucky River. Before flowing into the Kentucky River, Hickman Creek is formed from two separate creeks, East Hickman and West Hickman. West Hickman Creek flows through Fayette County, Kentucky and Jessamine County, Kentucky. Via the Kentucky and Ohio rivers, it is part of the Mississippi River watershed. Hickman Creek flows through 3 parks in Kentucky, Jacobson Park, Veterans Park and Belleau Woods Park.

Hickman Creek Conservancy was incorporated on January 1 of 2019 as a 501C3 non-profit organization in response to the community's concern with clean water. The Conservancy works with the city of Lexington's Stormwater Quality Projects Incentive Grant Program to improve water quality and educate citizens in the community. Continuing education about water quality in the Lexington area, the Geocaching Challenge was created as a fun outdoor treasure hunt which visits 12 water-related points of interest.

At Highway 1268 near Camp Nelson, the creek has a mean annual discharge of 192 cubic feet per second, from data collected in the years 2008–2015.

Hickman Creek is currently ranked #11 of the top 20 best smallmouth bass streams in the state by the Kentucky Department of Fish and Wildlife Resources. Some of the species of fish in Hickman Creek are smallmouth bass, largemouth bass, rock bass, bluegill, channel catfish, common carp, and spotted gar. The occasional muskellunge can be seen in the Spring months as well.

== See also ==
- List of rivers of Kentucky
