= Tennessee Valley Divide =

Boundary of the drainage basin of the Tennessee River and its tributaries

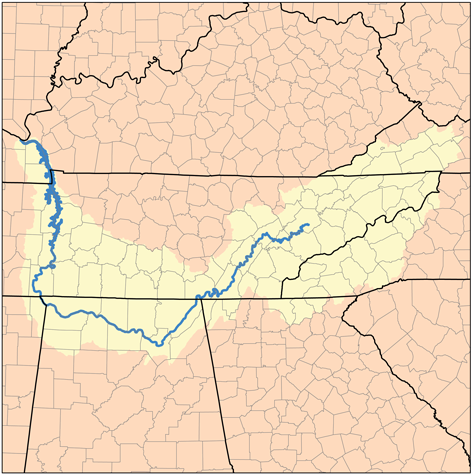
Map of the Tennessee Watershed

The Tennessee Valley Divide is the boundary of the drainage basin of the Tennessee River and its tributaries.

The Tennessee River drainage basin begins with its tributaries in southwestern Virginia and flows generally west to the confluence of the Tennessee with the Ohio River at Paducah, Kentucky. The Tennessee Valley Divide forms a loop surrounding the drainage basin, beginning and ending at the river's mouth in Paducah.

The divide passes through or touches the states of West Virginia, Virginia, North Carolina, South Carolina, Georgia, Alabama, Mississippi, Tennessee and Kentucky.

== Course ==
=== Northern portion ===
The northern portion of the divide mostly separates the Tennessee River watershed from that of Cumberland River, except for a portion in the northeast that bounds the Big Sandy River and New River watersheds. All four rivers empty into the Ohio River.

Following the Divide in a clockwise direction, it leads east and southeast through western Kentucky through the Land Between the Lakes, a narrow area between the Tennessee River and Cumberland River, then passes into Tennessee, where it continues southeast, passing south of the Nashville Basin on top of Duck River Ridge. Turning more to the east, the Divide climbs onto the low plateau of The Barrens, and then onto the higher Cumberland Plateau. The Divide turns northeast along the crest of the Cumberland Plateau, then follows the ridgecrest of Cumberland Mountain northeast to Cumberland Gap, at the junction of Tennessee, Kentucky, and Virginia.

The Divide continues northeast along the Kentucky–Virginia border, first following Cumberland Mountain, then Little Black and Black Mountain, after which it turns east into Virginia. The Divide follows the crest of Sandy Ridge northeast until it briefly touches the West Virginia border, then turns southeast near Tazewell, Virginia. From there, the divide follows an irregular line towards the south. In this area of southwestern Virginia, the divide forms the boundary between the drainage of the Tennessee River and the New River, which also flows to the Ohio River.

=== Eastern portion ===
Past a point near Blowing Rock, North Carolina in the Blue Ridge Mountains, the Tennessee Valley Divide coincides with the Eastern Continental Divide. To the east, water drains into the Santee River and Savannah River watersheds, both of which lead directly to the Atlantic Ocean. The Tennessee Valley Divide diverges from the Eastern Continental Divide at a point just northeast of Tray Mountain.

=== Southern portion ===
From there, the Tennessee Valley Divide trends generally westward, dividing the Tennessee Valley in Alabama from the generally southward-flowing rivers of Alabama and Mississippi. The Mobile River watershed makes up the greatest portion of this, but is a short divide with the Apalachicola River in the southeast. Some of those rivers, such as the Tombigbee River, have their headwaters remarkably close to the Tennessee River.

The divide then turns north, with smaller rivers draining to the west directly into the Mississippi River: the Hatchie River, Forked Deer River, Obion River, and Mayfield Creek. Finally, there is a divide with Massac Creek, which drains into the Ohio River. It ends at the foot of Broadway in downtown Paducah, Kentucky, which also marks Mile 0 of the Tennessee River at its confluence with the Ohio.
