= Cassidy Creek =

Stream in Fleming County, Kentucky, United States

Coordinates: 38.3806332°N 83.7457523°W

Cassidy Creek is a stream in Fleming County, Kentucky, in the United States. It is a tributary of the Licking River.

Cassidy Creek was named for Michael Cassidy, a pioneer settler.

== See also ==
- List of rivers of Kentucky
