= Drennon Creek =

Stream in Henry County, Kentucky, U.S.

Coordinates: 38.5061772°N 85.0288408°W

Drennon Creek is a stream in Henry County, Kentucky, in the United States. It is a tributary of the Kentucky River.

Drennon Creek was named for Jacob Drennon, who explored the area in the 1770s.

== See also ==
- List of rivers of Kentucky
