= Taylors Creek (Kentucky) =

Stream in Campbell County, Kentucky, U.S.

Coordinates: 39.0425614°N 84.4193847°W

Taylors Creek is a stream in Campbell County, Kentucky, in the United States. A variant name is Duck Creek. It is a tributary of the Ohio River. Taylors Creek forms the border between the towns of Bellevue, Kentucky and Newport, Kentucky.

== History ==
Taylors Creek was named for Col. James Taylor, the original owner of the surrounding land.

== See also ==
- List of rivers of Kentucky
