= Pond River =

146km tributary of the Green River in Western Kentucky, USA

Coordinates: 37.5272678°N 87.3541666°W

The Pond River is a 90.8-mile-long (146.1 km) tributary of the Green River in western Kentucky in the United States. Via the Green and Ohio rivers, it is part of the watershed of the Mississippi River.

The Pond River rises in central Todd County and flows generally north-northwestwardly, along the boundaries of Muhlenberg, Christian, Hopkins and McLean counties to the Green River, which it joins from the south about 5 miles (8 km) west-southwest of the town of Calhoun.

At the common boundary of Christian, Hopkins and Muhlenberg counties, it collects the 29.6-mile-long (47.6 km) West Fork Pond River. Upstream of this confluence, the Pond River has also been known as the East Fork Pond River.

== See also ==
- List of Kentucky rivers
