= Dreaming Creek (Kentucky) =

Stream in Madison County, Kentucky, U.S.

Coordinates: 37.785357°N 84.260764°W

Dreaming Creek is a stream in Madison County, Kentucky, in the United States.

According to tradition, Dreaming Creek was named on account of a dream of famed frontiersman Daniel Boone.

== See also ==
- List of rivers of Kentucky
