= Rockcastle River =

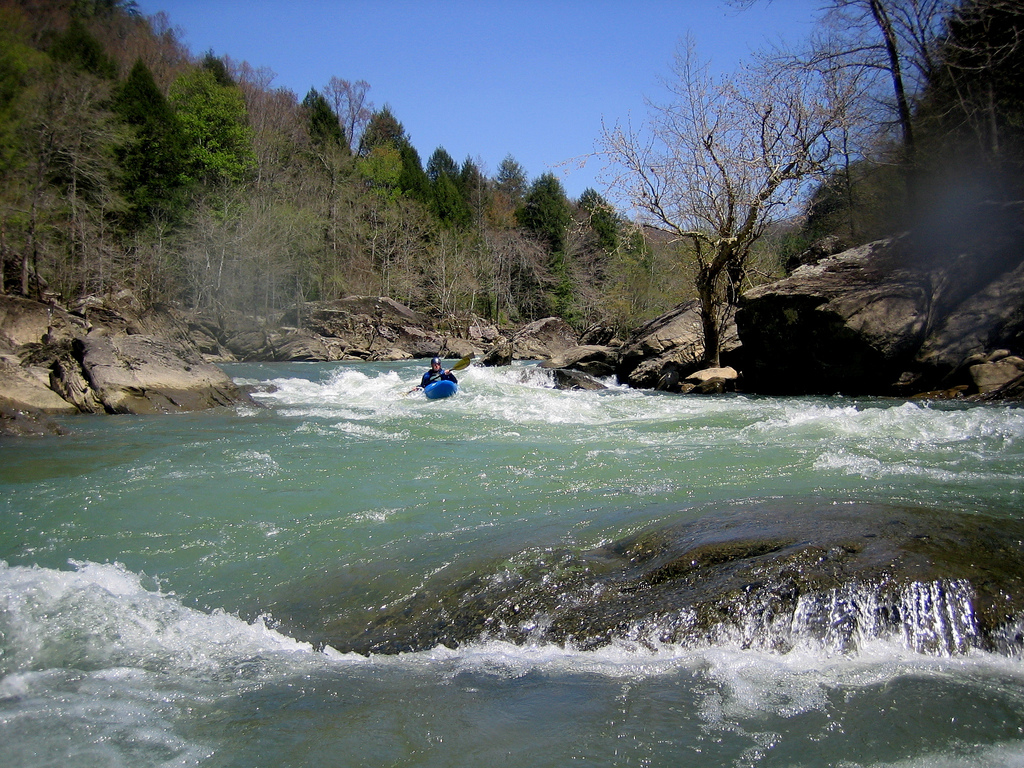
- A kayak on the Rockcastle River

- Location of the mouth of the Rockcastle River in Kentucky

Location
- Country: United States
- State: Kentucky

Physical characteristics
- Source: Jackson County line
  - location: kentucky
  - coordinates: 37°20′10″N 84°7′8″W
- Mouth: Cumberland River
  - location: kentucky
  - coordinates: 36°57′36″N 84°21′25″W
  - elevation: 888 ft (271 m)
- Length: 55 mi (89 km)
- Basin size: 4,100 sq mi (11,000 km^{2})

The Rockcastle River is a 54.8-mile-long (88.2 km) river primarily in Rockcastle County, Kentucky, United States. It is a tributary of the Cumberland River and therefore, via the Ohio River, part of the Mississippi River watershed.

== Origin of Name ==
In 1750 it was discovered by Dr. Thomas Walker and his exploring party, known as the Loyal Company. In his journal he named it the Lawless River, describing it as very steep and rocky. It was soon renamed by hunter Isaac Lindsey who founded Rockcastle County in 1767. Lindsey named the river after the castle-like rock formations.

== Course ==
The elevation is 888 ft. with the geolocation at (37.171, -84.296). The river has two forks, the Middle Fork, which forms in southern Jackson County, and the South Fork, which forms in Clay County. They meet at the Jackson County line and flow south, forming the southeast border of Rockcastle County. It makes up the border between Pulaski and Laurel counties before flowing into the Cumberland River. Due to the river carving into the Cumberland Plateau, many limestone and sandstone caves are formed.

The river is used for recreational activities such as kayaking for sport through the rapid waters, and fishing for the many fish species.

== Flora and Fauna ==
The river has an important native walleye population that has stabilized in recent years. The waters also contain over 65 fish species including rock bass, small mouth bass, with a variety of bluegill and other pan fish. Over 38 mussel species and 10 crayfish species are also found in the waters of the river. The small cave systems formed in the limestone provides a home for several bat species, amphibians, and reptiles. Black bears are known to swim the waters and navigate the rocky banks. The gravel terrain provides life for many rare species of plants such as the Eurybia saxicastelli. The Rockcastle Conservation Initiative formed in 2010 works to protect the diversity of this important habitat.

== See also ==
- No Business Branch, a tributary
- List of rivers of Kentucky
