= Lawrence Creek (Kentucky) =

Stream in Mason County, Kentucky, U.S.

Coordinates: 38.7072949°N 83.8327015°W

Lawrence Creek is a stream in Mason County, Kentucky, in the United States. It is a tributary of the Ohio River.

Lawrence Creek was named for Lawrence Darnall, a member of a company of explorers in the area in the 1770s.

== See also ==
- List of rivers of Kentucky
