= Dry Creek (Kentucky) =

Creek in Kentucky

Coordinates: 39.0706154°N 84.6243893°W

Dry Creek is a stream in Boone and Kenton counties, Kentucky, in the United States. It is a tributary of the Ohio River.

Dry Creek was so named from low water levels during dry weather.

A large wastewater treatment plant has operated on Dry Creek since 1979.

== See also ==
- List of rivers of Kentucky
