= Tearcoat Creek (Kentucky) =

Stream in Clinton County, Kentucky, U.S.

Coordinates: 36.857287°N 85.211903°W

Tearcoat Creek is a stream in Clinton County, Kentucky, in the United States.

According to tradition, Tearcoat Creek was so named when a young girl tore her coat while escaping a bear.

== See also ==
- List of rivers of Kentucky
