= Beaver Creek (Kentucky) =

Stream in Floyd County, Kentucky, U.S.

Coordinates: 37.6139870°N 82.7298805°W

Beaver Creek is a stream in Floyd County, Kentucky, in the United States. It is located between the towns of Martin and Allen City.

Some of the first white visitors to Floyd County camped on Beaver Creek in 1775.

There are 6 branches that come off of the creek: Hunter Branch, Arkansas Creek, Lane Branch, Betsy Clark Branch, Eel Branch, and Hatcher Branch.

Along Beaver Creek is Stumbo park. The park includes baseball fields, basketball courts, and recreational fire pits open to use of the public. The park also includes a 9-hole golf course.

== Water quality ==
A biological assessment of the creek was taken in 2002 by the Kentucky Environmental and Public Protection Cabinet. 1 of the 28 samples taken from the creek was deemed suitable for full use. The other samples were deemed partially suitable. Coal mining is the main factor contributing to the poor water quality. There was a 5% decrease in surrounding forest in the watershed zone observed between 1994 and 2002. Additionally there was an 18% decrease in the riparian zone.

== Coal mining history ==
Thomas Walker was the first to discover and utilize coal mining in Kentucky in 1750. In the early to mid 1900's there were 130 mining companies drilling for coal in the surrounding area of Beaver Creek. Coal mining boosted the economy in the surrounding area's of Beaver Creek. In 2014, $61.3 million in coal severance tax went back to coal mining counties for infrastructure and economic improvements.

== See also ==
- List of rivers of Kentucky
