= Silver Creek (Kentucky) =

Coordinates: 37.79675°N 84.47438°W

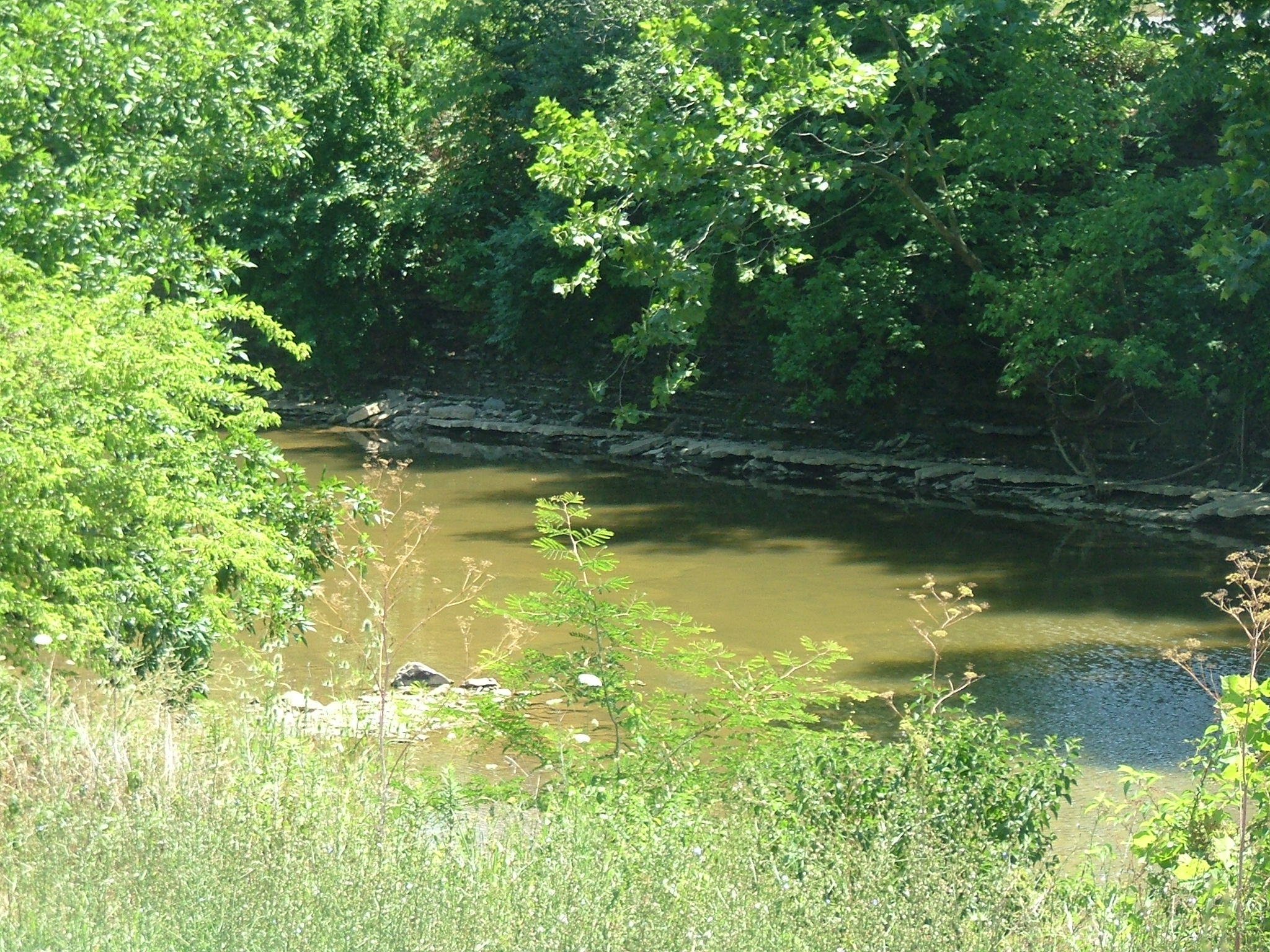
- Silver Creek west of Richmond

Location
- Country: United States

Physical characteristics
- Source
  - location: Near Berea, Kentucky
- Mouth
  - location: Kentucky River in Madison County, Kentucky.
  - elevation: 541 ft (165 m)

Silver Creek is a large creek that flows for approximately 40 miles (64 km) through Madison County, Kentucky, in the United States.

The creek's depth varies from a few inches to over 8 feet (2 m) at normal water levels. Its headwaters are located south of Berea. It reaches its terminus northwest of Richmond at the Kentucky River. It is one of six major creeks flowing north through Madison County and emptying into the Kentucky River. The westernmost of these is Paint Lick Creek, which forms the boundary between Garrard and Madison Counties. Silver Creek flows parallel to Paint Lick Creek, and the two define the westernmost finger of Madison County, a long ridge known as Poosey Ridge.

== See also ==
- List of rivers of Kentucky
