= Defeated Creek, Kentucky =

Unincorporated community in Kentucky, United States

Coordinates: 37°03′06″N 82°59′35″W

Defeated Creek is an unincorporated community in Letcher County, Kentucky, in the United States.

== History ==
A post office was established at Defeated Creek in 1909, and remained in operation until it was discontinued in 1943.

== See also ==
- Defeated Creek (Letcher County, Kentucky), a stream
