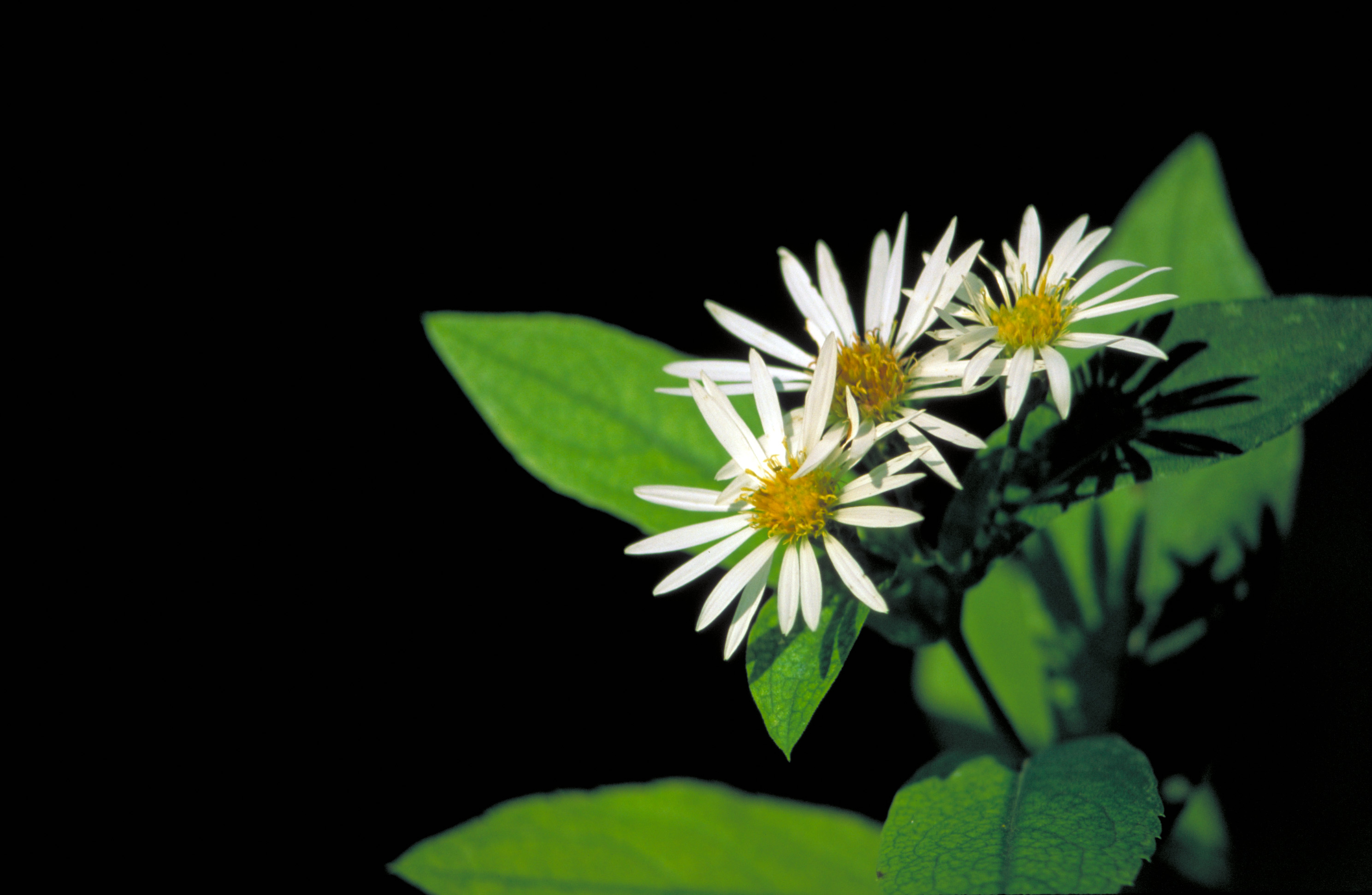

Conservation status
- Critically Imperiled (NatureServe)

Scientific classification
- Kingdom: Plantae
- Clade: Tracheophytes
- Clade: Angiosperms
- Clade: Eudicots
- Clade: Asterids
- Order: Asterales
- Family: Asteraceae
- Genus: Eurybia
- Species: E. saxicastelli

Binomial name
- Eurybia saxicastelli (J.N. Campbell & M. Medley) G.L.Nesom

Synonyms
- Aster saxicastellii J.J.N. Campbell & M. Medley

= Eurybia saxicastelli =

Species of flowering plant

Eurybia saxicastelli, commonly known as the Rockcastle aster, is an herbaceous perennial native to the south eastern United States. It is present only in the states of Kentucky and Tennessee along the Rockcastle River and the nearby Big South Fork River. As a result of its extremely restricted range as well as human alterations to its habitat, it is considered critically imperiled by NatureServe. The flowers appear in the late summer through fall and have ray florets that are pale blue to pale white and yellow disc florets that turn purplish with age.

== Distribution and habitat ==
Eurybia saxicastelli is present in the southeastern United States, where it is restricted to the states of Kentucky and Tennessee. More specifically, it is only known from a 5 kilometer stretch of the banks of the Rockcastle River and about 14 occurrences along the Big South Fork River, which is nearby. It is found primarily growing at the back edge of sandstone river bars composed of boulders and cobbles, along with other shrubby vegetation. These areas are flooded in the spring, but dry in the summer, making the habitat quite specific. Of the areas where it can be found, it is typically between 1000 and 1500 meters elevation, but in some cases it is found at sites as low as 600 meters.
