= Bethel Cemetery and Church =

Historic site in Pendleton County, Kentucky, US

Coordinates: 38°43′16″N 84°22′34″W

Bethel Cemetery is a cemetery at the intersection of US 27 and KY 17 approximately 5 miles north of Falmouth, Pendleton County, Kentucky, at the site of the former Bethel Church. The historic frame church stood at this intersection since its dedication in 1881. The original pews were still in the building and volunteers had recently restored the church when it was destroyed by a tornado in 2015. The land for the church and cemetery was donated by the estate of William J. Bradford.

The Bethel Church was named a Kentucky Landmark in April 2008. The Bethel Cemetery board hoped to have the building listed on the National Register of Historic Places.

John Rarreick (1844–1904) an Indian Campaigns Medal of Honor Recipient, is buried at this cemetery. Also, Private Coleman Reed Asberry (1780–1859), a veteran of the War of 1812, and several veterans of the American Civil War, World War I and World War II are buried in this cemetery.
