= Elijahs Creek =

Stream in Boone County, Kentucky, U.S.

Coordinates: 39.1031144°N 84.6943911°W

Elijahs Creek is a stream in Boone County, Kentucky, United States. It is a tributary of the Ohio River. Its headwaters rise in Cincinnati/Northern Kentucky International Airport.

The namesake of Elijahs Creek is unknown.

== See also ==
- List of rivers of Kentucky
