= No Business Branch =

Stream in Kentucky, U.S.

Coordinates: 37.0017496°N 84.3141024°W

No Business Branch is a stream in the U.S. state of Kentucky. It is a two-mile long tributary of the Rockcastle River in southwestern Laurel County, Kentucky.

No Business Branch was so named by moonshiners as a warning to would-be visitors they had "no business" being there.

== See also ==
- List of rivers of Kentucky
