= Butler, Kentucky =

- City
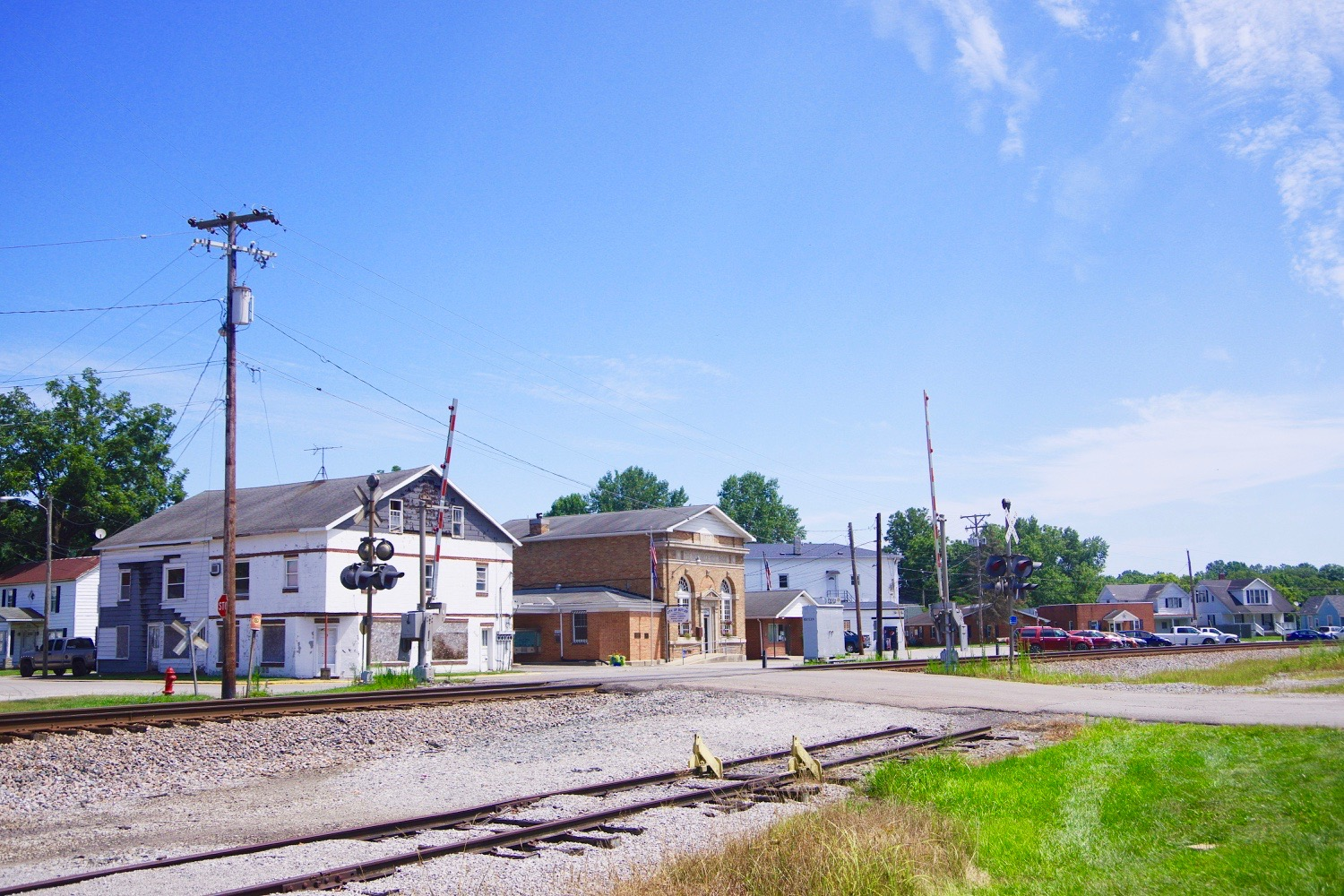
- Butler

- Location of Butler in Pendleton County, Kentucky.
- Coordinates: 38°47′16″N 84°22′19″W
- Country: United States
- State: Kentucky
- County: Pendleton

Government
  - Type: Mayor/Council
  - Mayor: Mason D. Taylor

Area
  - Total: 0.20 sq mi (0.53 km^{2})
  - Land: 0.19 sq mi (0.49 km^{2})
  - Water: 0.015 sq mi (0.04 km^{2})
- Elevation: 541 ft (165 m)

Population (2020)
  - Total: 646
  - Density: 3,402.4/sq mi (1,313.67/km^{2})
- Time zone: UTC-5 (Eastern (EST))
  - Summer (DST): UTC-4 (EDT)
- ZIP code: 41006
- Area code: 859
- FIPS code: 21-11530
- GNIS feature ID: 2403959
- Website: https://butlerky.org/

Butler is a home rule-class city in Pendleton County, Kentucky, in the United States. As of the 2020 census, Butler had a population of 646.

== Geography ==
According to the United States Census Bureau, Butler has a total area of 0.2 square miles (0.52 km^{2}), of which 0.2 square miles (0.52 km^{2}) is land and 4.17% is water.

== History ==
The city of Butler was established around 1852 when the Kentucky Central Railroad was built through the area. When it was incorporated on February 1, 1868, the city was named for area's earlier U.S. representative William O. Butler.

== Demographics ==
Historical population
Census	Pop.	Note	%±
1870	144		—
1880	255		77.1%
1890	560		119.6%
1900	506		−9.6%
1910	426		−15.8%
1920	406		−4.7%
1930	364		−10.3%
1940	359		−1.4%
1950	404		12.5%
1960	450		11.4%
1970	558		24.0%
1980	663		18.8%
1990	625		−5.7%
2000	613		−1.9%
2010	612		−0.2%
2020	646		5.6%
U.S. Decennial Census

As of the census of 2000, there were 613 people, 237 households, and 164 families residing in the city. The population density was 2,632.4 inhabitants per square mile (1,016.4/km^{2}). There were 268 housing units at an average density of 1,150.9 per square mile (444.4/km^{2}). The racial makeup of the city was 98.69% White, 0.49% African American, 0.16% from other races, and 0.65% from two or more races. Hispanic or Latino of any race were 0.49% of the population.

There were 237 households, out of which 43.9% had children under the age of 18 living with them, 46.4% were married couples living together, 16.0% had a female householder with no husband present, and 30.4% were non-families. 23.6% of all households were made up of individuals, and 5.9% had someone living alone who was 65 years of age or older. The average household size was 2.52 and the average family size was 2.97.

In the city, the population was spread out, with 31.0% under the age of 18, 11.4% from 18 to 24, 33.9% from 25 to 44, 15.2% from 45 to 64, and 8.5% who were 65 years of age or older. The median age was 29 years. For every 100 females, there were 87.5 males. For every 100 females age 18 and over, there were 85.5 males.

The median income for a household in the city was $34,286, and the median income for a family was $37,946. Males had a median income of $27,396 versus $22,250 for females. The per capita income for the city was $14,751. About 14.5% of families and 15.9% of the population were below the poverty line, including 22.0% of those under age 18 and 21.6% of those age 65 or over. Butler's crime rate has increased over the past two years.

== See also ==
- Fryer House, an 1811 stone house, home of the Pendleton County Historical Society
