= Middle Fork Kentucky River =

River in Kentucky, United States

Physical characteristics
- Mouth: Kentucky River
  - location: just upstream of Beattyville
  - coordinates: 37°35′12″N 83°40′12″W

Middle Fork Kentucky River is a river in Kentucky in the United States. It is a fork of the Kentucky River that it joins just upstream of Beattyville. It is approximately 85 miles (137 km) long.

It rises in the Appalachian Mountains in extreme southeastern Kentucky, in northeastern Harlan County, approximately 5 mi (8 km) from the Virginia state line. It flows initially southwest, in the valley on the eastern side of Pine Mountain, then passes along the southeastern end of the ridge, flowing north through the Cumberland Plateau past Hyden. At Buckhorn, it is impounded to form the Buckhorn Lake reservoir. North of the reservoir it flows generally northwest and joins the North Fork in Lee County.

== Basin and hydrology ==
=== Floods ===
The Kentucky River basin, including Middle Fork and its tributaries, suffered a major flood in January and February 1957. Peak flood levels were higher by 5.0 feet (1.5 m) at Buckhorn and 2.83 feet (0.86 m) at Tallega than the previous record peak levels in 1939. One person was drowned in Cutshin Creek.

Most of the urban damage was at Buckhorn, with properties under up to 10 feet (3.0 m) of water, and at Hyden. In Bockhorn 10 homes were destroyed, and in Hyden 30% of the homes were damaged in some way. 20 commercial buildings in Hyden were flooded, and the local lumber company had a lot of its stock swept away.

== Tributaries and other locations ==
- Its major tributaries include:
  - Hell-for-Certain Creek 9 miles (14 km) downstream of Hyden at altitude 780 feet (240 m), mouth at 37°14′45″N 83°22′55″W headwaters at 37°11′44″N 83°28′35″W.
    - Mill Branch 1.375 miles (2.213 km) upstream at altitude 848 feet (258 m), mouth at 37°14′05″N 83°23′43″W headwaters at 37°12′58″N 83°24′15″W
    - Big Fork
    - Devils Jump Branch 2.25 miles (3.62 km) upstream, mouth at 37°13′56″N 83°24′55″W headwaters at 37°14′31″N 83°25′40″W
  - Oldhouse Branch 8.5 miles (13.7 km) downstream of Hyden at altitude 785 feet (239 m), mouth at 37°14′44″N 83°22′29″W headwaters at 37°14′38″N 83°21′38″W
  - Polly Morril Branch 7.25 miles (11.67 km) downstream of Hyden at altitude 795 feet (242 m), mouth at 37°13′47″N 83°22′25″W headwaters at 37°13′39″N 83°21′15″W
  - Bull Creek 6.5 miles (10.5 km) downstream of Hyden at altitude 800 feet (240 m), whose name anecdotally comes from pioneer settler John Amis having shot a bull buffalo on its banks, mouth at 37°13′13″N 83°22′34″W headwaters at 37°09′53″N 83°27′18″W
    - Lower Field Branch 1.125 miles (1.811 km) upstream at altitude 830 feet (250 m),
    - Wolf Pen Branch 3 miles (4.8 km) upstream at altitude 890 feet (270 m), mouth at 37°11′36″N 83°24′32″W headwaters at 37°10′40″N 83°24′19″W
    - Thousand Sticks Branch 5.125 miles (8.248 km) upstream at altitude 940 feet (290 m), mouth at 37°11′09″N 83°25′34″W headwaters at 37°09′36″N 83°24′58″W at the foot of Thousandsticks Mountain
    - Henry Fork (a.k.a. Osborne Fork)
    - Davidson Fork 5.5 miles (8.9 km) upstream at altitude 1,015 feet (309 m), mouth at 37°10′27″N 83°26′18″W headwaters at 37°09′30″N 83°26′42″W
  - Cutshin Creek 6.5 miles (10.5 km) downstream of Hyden at altitude 880 feet (270 m), mouth at 37°13′10″N 83°22′30″W, whose further tributaries and locations are in its article
  - Mile Branch 4.75 miles (7.64 km) downstream of Hyden at altitude 800 feet (240 m), mouth at 37°12′00″N 83°22′51″W headwaters at 37°11′42″N 83°23′29″W
  - Nighwaw Branch 4.5 miles (7.2 km) downstream of Hyden at altitude 805 feet (245 m),
  - Elic Branch 3.75 miles (6.04 km) downstream of Hyden at altitude 805 feet (245 m), mouth at 37°11′34″N 83°22′02″W headwaters at 37°10′31″N 83°21′07″W
  - Asher Branch 2.25 miles (3.62 km) downstream of Hyden at altitude 815 feet (248 m), mouth at 37°10′58″N 83°22′57″W headwaters at 37°10′14″N 83°24′19″W
  - Betty Branch 1.75 miles (2.82 km) downstream of Hyden at altitude 815 feet (248 m),
  - Owls-Nest Branch 0.5 miles (0.80 km) downstream of Hyden at altitude 815 feet (248 m), mouth at 37°10′12″N 83°21′58″W
    - a left branch 0.125 miles (0.201 km) upstream,
    - Banger Branch 1.25 miles (2.01 km) upstream at altitude 915 feet (279 m), mouth at 37°10′01″N 83°20′58″W headwaters at 37°09′44″N 83°20′18″W
  - Roberts Branch 0.5 miles (0.80 km) downstream of Hyden at altitude 815 feet (248 m),
  - Rockhouse Creek at Hyden at altitude 820 feet (250 m),
    - Tantrough Branch 0.375 miles (0.604 km) upstream at altitude 830 feet (250 m),
    - Big Lute Branch 2 miles (3.2 km) upstream at altitude 876 feet (267 m),
    - Shack Branch 3.5 miles (5.6 km) upstream at altitude 921 feet (281 m),
    - Potato Knob Branch 4.5 miles (7.2 km) upstream at altitude 950 feet (290 m),
    - Puncheon Camp Branch 5.25 miles (8.45 km) upstream at altitude 988 feet (301 m),
    - Road Fork 5.5 miles (8.9 km) upstream at altitude 1,000 feet (300 m),
    - Left Branch 5.5 miles (8.9 km) upstream at altitude 1,000 feet (300 m),
      - Laurel Creek 0.5 miles (0.80 km) upstream at altitude 1,010 feet (310 m),
  - Hurst Creek 0.5 miles (0.80 km) upstream of Hyden at altitude 825 feet (251 m),
    - Round Hole Branch 0.75 miles (1.21 km) upstream at altitude 900 feet (270 m),
    - Rough Branch 1.375 miles (2.213 km) upstream at altitude 1,105 feet (337 m),
    - Davis Branch (a.k.a. Mart's Branch) 1.375 miles (2.213 km) upstream at altitude 1,160 feet (350 m),
  - Short Creek 2 miles (3.2 km) upstream of Hyden at altitude 835 feet (255 m),
    - a right branch 1.125 miles (1.811 km) upstream at altitude 935 feet (285 m),
    - a right branch 1.375 miles (2.213 km) upstream,
    - a right branch 1.75 miles (2.82 km) upstream at altitude 960 feet (290 m),
  - Munsey Creek 3.25 miles (5.23 km) upstream of Hyden at altitude 845 feet (258 m),
    - Right Fork 1.5 miles (2.4 km) upstream at altitude 965 feet (294 m),
  - Hurricane Creek 4.25 miles (6.84 km) upstream of Hyden at altitude 848 feet (258 m),
    - a left branch 1.25 miles (2.01 km) upstream at altitude 1,030 feet (310 m),
    - Wolf Fork 1.5 miles (2.4 km) upstream at altitude 1,070 feet (330 m),
    - a right branch 2 miles (3.2 km) upstream,
  - Burnt Camp Creek 5.25 miles (8.45 km) upstream of Hyden at altitude 850 feet (260 m),
    - Morgan Branch at Burnt Camp mouth at altitude 856 feet (261 m),
    - Left Fork 0.5 miles (0.80 km) upstream at altitude 875 feet (267 m),
    - Big Branch 2 miles (3.2 km) upstream at altitude 1,045 feet (319 m),
    - Camp Branch 2.25 miles (3.62 km) upstream at altitude 1,075 feet (328 m),
  - Johns Creek 7.75 miles (12.47 km) upstream of Hyden at altitude 870 feet (270 m),
    - Right Fork 0.25 miles (0.40 km) upstream at altitude 910 feet (280 m),
  - Lower Bad Creek,
    - Bonnet Rock Branch 3.25 miles (5.23 km) upstream at altitude 1,255 feet (383 m),
    - Marion Fork 4.875 miles (7.846 km) upstream at altitude 1,325 feet (404 m),
  - Stinnett Creek 10.25 miles (16.50 km) upstream of Hyden at altitude 900 feet (270 m),
    - Little Stinnett Creek 0.875 miles (1.408 km) upstream at altitude 956 feet (291 m),
    - Lick Fork 3.875 miles (6.236 km) upstream at altitude 1,285 feet (392 m),
    - Big Branch 4.75 miles (7.64 km) upstream at altitude 1,350 feet (410 m),
  - Greasy Creek 11.25 miles (18.11 km) upstream of Hyden at altitude 900 feet (270 m),
  - Saltwell Branch 12.75 miles (20.52 km) upstream of Hyden at altitude 915 feet (279 m),
  - Trace Branch (a.k.a. Harmon Branch 12.875 miles (20.720 km) upstream of Hyden at altitude 915 feet (279 m),
    - Martor Fork 1.25 miles (2.01 km) upstream at altitude 1,070 feet (330 m),
  - Beech Fork 15 miles (24 km) upstream of Hyden at altitude 950 feet (290 m), whose further tributaries and locations are in its article
  - Lower Bad Creek 15.75 miles (25.35 km) upstream of Hyden at altitude 963 feet (294 m),
  - Pinch Hollow 17.125 miles (27.560 km) upstream of Hyden at altitude 1,002 feet (305 m),
  - Upper Bad Creek 18.5 miles (29.8 km) upstream of Hyden at altitude 1,042 feet (318 m),
  - Sang Branch (a.k.a. Ginseng Branch) 20.125 miles (32.388 km) upstream of Hyden at altitude 1,070 feet (330 m),
  - White Oak Creek 20.5 miles (33.0 km) upstream of Hyden at altitude 1,085 feet (331 m),
  - War Branch 22.25 miles (35.81 km) upstream of Hyden at altitude 1,180 feet (360 m),
  - Rye Cove Branch 22.625 miles (36.411 km) upstream of Hyden at altitude 1,200 feet (370 m),
  - Roark Branch 23.5 miles (37.8 km) upstream of Hyden at altitude 1,240 feet (380 m),
  - Turkey Branch 25 miles (40 km) upstream of Hyden,
  - Spruce Pine Creek 25.5 miles (41.0 km) upstream of Hyden at altitude 1,325 feet (404 m),
    - Dry Fork 0.25 miles (0.40 km) upstream at altitude 1,325 feet (404 m),
      - two forks 1.5 miles (2.4 km) upstream,
    - Long Fork 1.25 miles (2.01 km) upstream at altitude 1,495 feet (456 m),
  - Mazie Branch 26.5 miles (42.6 km) upstream of Hyden at altitude 1,435 feet (437 m),
  - Rough Branch 27.25 miles (43.85 km) upstream of Hyden at altitude 1,570 feet (480 m),
  - Rainbow Branch (a.k.a. Meadow Branch) 28.5 miles (45.9 km) upstream of Hyden at altitude 1,675 feet (511 m),

The confluence of Bull Creek, the main Middle Fork, and Cutshin Creek was known in the 19th century in Kentucky as a "turkeyfoot".

=== Hell-For-Certain Creek and Osha, Omarsville/Kaliopi post offices ===
The name of Hell-For-Certain Creek comes, anecdotally, from the bad experience of a pair of travellers navigating its waters. It is a common favourite name to use in stories about travelling in Kentucky, although the eye dialect pronunciation of "Hell For Sartin" that is employed by storytellers is incorrect and considered offensive and insulting by native Kentuckians.

The Osha post office was established by postmaster William C. "Short Buckel Bill" Begley on 1906-09-15. Begley had originally wanted the name Hell For Certain after the creek, but this was rejected by the USPS, so his second choice was the name of his daughter (1893–1990). It was located at the mouth of Hell-for-Certain Creek, and closed in December 1907.

The Omarsville post office was established on 1929-02-27 by postmaster Lilbern W. Woods. It was named after Omar Huff, the son of Republican Party official Elmer Huff. Originally located at the mouth of Mill Branch, it moved around several times over the years. It was at several sites on Big Fork, then in 1942 postmasters Ethel Pilatos (née Woods and Lilbern's sister) and her husband Sam Pilatos (an immigrant from Greece) moved it to the site of Sam's store that, then was and still now is, located at the mouth of Devils Jump and called The Mouth of Devils Jump Branch. Because of other similarly named post offices and mail being misdirected, on 1945-03-01 Omarsville was renamed Kaliopi after Sam's mother (cf. Calliope). It closed in July 1981.

=== Dryhill and Gad/Thousandsticks post offices on Bull Creek ===
The Dryhill post office was established on 1897-09-30 by postmaster Dan McDaniel. It was located on a literally dry hill just above the "turkeyfoot" confluence of Bull Creek, Middle Fork, and Cutshin Creek, where the Daniel Boone Parkway and Kentucky Route 257 now cross Middle Fork. Like Omarsville, it served a store located at the mouth of Bull Creek and called The Mouth of Bull Creek. It closed in July 1908, and McDaniel tried to reestablish it on 1910-08-13, this time using his own surname. However, that name was taken in Breckenridge County so he continued with the original Dryhill. It became a rural branch of Hyden post office in 1964.

The Gad post office was established on 1905-03-01 by postmaster Polly Osborne. She had originally wanted the name Bull Creek but that was taken and so she chose Gad after the Tribe of Gad or Gad. It was originally located a slight distance upstream on Henry Fork, and on 1924-05-31 moved to Bull Creek itself at the mouth of Thousandsticks Creek, after which it was at the same time renamed. It closed in November 2004.

Thousandsticks post office, the creek it was renamed after, a school, church, the local weekly newspaper in Hyden, and Thousandsticks Mountain after which they all were named, have two different origin stories for their names. The first is that early settlers found a large number of old dead trees in the area and so named it after the "thousand sticks", i.e. tree trunks. The second is that early travellers discovered the aftermath of a forest fire in the area and so named it after the "thousand sticks", i.e. charred tree stumps.

Kentucky Route 118, which joins the Daniel Boone Parkway at Thousandsticks, is called the "Hyden Spur" as it is the access road for Hyden.

=== General ===
In 1918, Howard Asher and Rene Asher had mines on Red Bird just downstream of the ford that is downstream of Asher Branch. Andrew Asher had one on Banger Branch; and Hughes Asher one on Roberts Branch.

Nathanial Roberts's mine was on Roberts Branch.

== See also ==
- List of rivers of Kentucky

== Sources ==
- Hodge, James Michael (1918). Coals of the Middle Fork of Kentucky River in Leslie and Harlan Counties. Reports of the Kentucky Geological Survey 4th series 1912–1918. Frankfort, Kentucky: The State Journal Company. OCLC 1042126645. (Coals of the Middle Fork of Kentucky River in Leslie and Harlan Counties at the Internet Archive)
- Quinones, Ferdinand; Mull, Donald S.; York, Karen; Kendall, Victoria (August 1981). Hydrology of Area 14, Eastern Coal Province, Kentucky. Water Resources Investigations. Louisville, Kentucky: United States Geological Survey. doi:10.3133/ofr81137.
- Rennick, Robert M. (2000). Harlan County — Post Offices. County Histories of Kentucky. Vol. 391. Morehead State University.
- Rennick, Robert M. (2000). Leslie County — Post Offices. County Histories of Kentucky. Vol. 241. Morehead State University.
- Rennick, Robert M. (2000). Lee County — Post Offices. County Histories of Kentucky. Vol. 242. Morehead State University.
- United States Army Corps of Engineers, Louisville District (1958-06-30). Review of Reports on Kentucky River and Tributaries. Louisville, Kentucky: Secretary of the Army.
- United States Geological Survey (1964). Floods of January–February 1957 in Southeastern Kentucky and Adjacent Areas. Geological Survey Water-supply Paper. United States Government Printing Office. 1652-A.
