= Blackberry Creek (Kentucky) =

Stream in Pike County, Kentucky, U.S.

Coordinates: 37°36′29″N 82°9′47″W

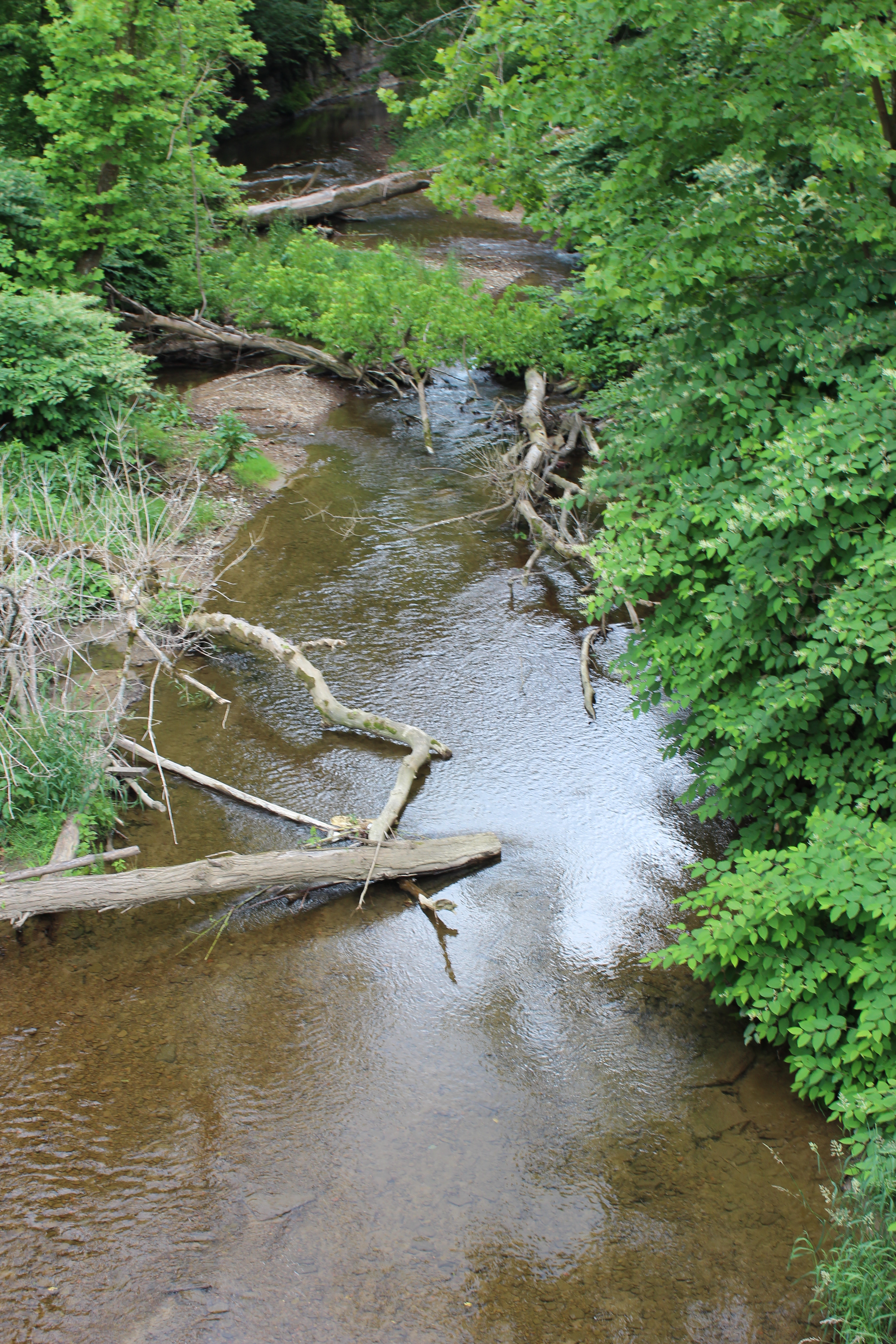
Blackberry Creek

Blackberry Creek is a stream in Pike County, Kentucky, in the United States. It is a tributary of the Tug Fork, part of the Big Sandy River and thus the Ohio River watershed.

Blackberry Creek was named from the blackberry bushes near its banks.

== See also ==
- List of rivers of Kentucky
