= Betty Troublesome Creek =

Stream in Knott County, Kentucky, US

Coordinates: 37.2517658°N 82.9443281°W

Betty Troublesome Creek is a stream in Knott County, Kentucky, in the United States.

The name Betty Troublesome honors "Aunt Betty", a woman who was a first settler in the area.

== See also ==
- List of rivers of Kentucky
