= Woolper Creek =

Stream in Boone County, United States of America

Coordinates: 39.022281°N 84.860228°W

Woolper Creek is a stream in Boone County, Kentucky, United States. It is a tributary of the Ohio River.

Woolper Creek has the name of John David Woolpert, a pioneer citizen.

== See also ==
- List of rivers of Kentucky
