= Fryer House =

Historic house in Kentucky, United States

- U.S. National Register of Historic Places
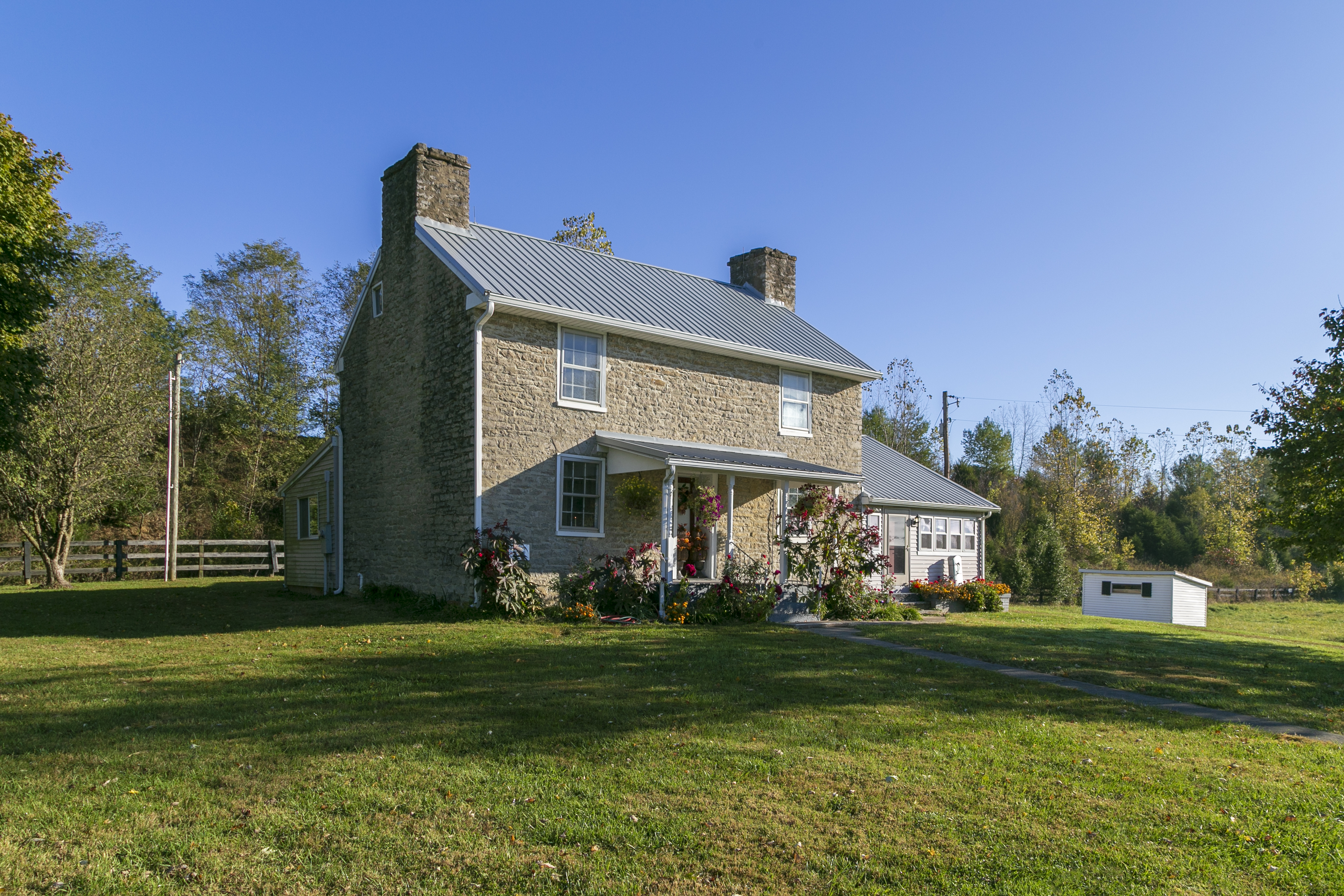

- Location within Kentucky Location within the United States
- Location: On U.S. Route 27 northeast of Butler, Kentucky
- Coordinates: 38.793859°N 84.352787°W
- Area: 5 acres (2.0 ha)
- Built: 1811–1813
- NRHP reference No.: 76000938
- Added to NRHP: October 8, 1976

The Fryer House is a historic two-story stone house located in Butler, Kentucky. It was built by Pendleton County, Kentucky pioneer Walter Fryer in 1811. Abraham Vastine, a housebuilder, built this house of limestone from an adjacent quarry, and it has walls two feet thick. The roof truss system is built of wood framing held together with wooden pegs. The home was not completed until 1813.

It is a two-story three-bay stone hall and parlor plan house, with one-story frame additions on the east and north. The home was listed on the National Register of Historic Places in 1976.

The Pendleton County Historical Society announced in April 2007 that it had leased the home for 99 years as a museum and Society offices. The building had been vacant for seven years.
