= Stepstone Creek =

Coordinates: 38.837568°N 84.237713°W

Location
- Country: United States
- State: Kentucky
- County: Pendleton County

Physical characteristics
- Source
  - location: Pendleton County, Kentucky
- Mouth
  - location: Pendleton County, Kentucky

Stepstone Creek is a stream located entirely within Pendleton County, Kentucky.

Stepstone Creek was named for the natural "steps" within its course.

== See also ==
- List of rivers of Kentucky
