= Mistaken Creek =

Stream in Grayson County, Kentucky, U.S.

Coordinates: 37.5483862°N 86.6077623°W

Mistaken Creek is a stream in Grayson County, in the U.S. state of Kentucky.

Mistaken Creek was likely so named because it was mistaken by surveyors for another nearby stream. Mistaken Creek has been noted for its unusual place name.

== See also ==
- List of rivers of Kentucky
