= Massac Creek (Kentucky) =

Coordinates: 37.1339435°N 88.7189417°W

Massac Creek is a small stream found in McCracken County, Kentucky, running west of Paducah. It is considered to be a great creek to kayak, fish, and swim. The creek runs for 15.5 miles (24.9 km).

Massac Creek gets its name from Massac County, Illinois, where it empties into the Ohio River. The source of the creek is located near Saint Johns, Kentucky. It has one major branch known as Little Massac Creek.

The creek is home to many species of fish, including gar and bluegill. Little Massac Creek has greater biodiversity due to less development and run off than the main creek.

Massac Creek was named and charted in the 1830s or 1840s when Paducah was founded. For many years it was used to power a saw mill known as Maxon Saw Mill.

== See also ==
- List of rivers of Kentucky
