= Sinking Creek (Clinch River tributary) =

Stream in Scott and Russell County, Virginia, U.S.

Coordinates: 36°49′31.37″N 82°25′50.54″W

Sinking Creek is a stream in Scott and Russell counties, Virginia, in the United States.

Sinking Creek was so named because it sinks underground and resurfaces downstream. Beginning south of the Clinch River, Sinking Creek actually crosses the Clinch underground before resurfacing on the northern side of the Clinch, where the two join. It is thought to be one of few streams in the world—perhaps the only stream—to be found on both sides of the river that it flows into. This occurrence is likely due to the unique karst topography exhibited throughout the region.

== See also ==
- List of rivers of Virginia
