= Kentucky River Authority =

The Kentucky River Authority is an agency of the Commonwealth of Kentucky. Its major purpose is to operate and maintain a set of locks and dams along the course of the Kentucky River, which were originally built by the U.S. Army Corps of Engineers. As of May 2018, Locks 5 through 14 are operated by the Authority, while Locks 1 through 4 are in the process of being deeded over to it. The Authority was established in 1986.

This system makes the Kentucky River navigable throughout its entire length. However, it is not available for efficient use by many of the modern barge tows, as the locks are relatively small and the channel is maintained to only a six-foot draft rather than the more typical nine-foot draft (the latter is the standard used on most major river systems in the U.S.). The Authority also works to prevent water pollution as much as is practicable along the Kentucky River Basin, in large measure because the stream is the source of the drinking water for approximately one-sixth of all Kentucky residents. The Authority's responsibility for water quality was added to its mission in 1988 after a serious and prolonged drought brought issues of water quality and availability to the fore. In fact, the system is now operated more for the purpose of maintaining a secure supply of drinkable water for Lexington and other communities than it is to maximize navigation.

== See also ==
- Tennessee Valley Authority
