= Salt Lick Creek (Kentucky) =

Stream in Lewis County, Kentucky, U.S.

Coordinates: 38.6072984°N 83.3204621°W

Salt Lick Creek is a stream in Lewis County, Kentucky, in the United States. It is a tributary of the Ohio River.

The mineral lick from which Salt Lick Creek took its name was noted by settlers in the 18th century. Salt Lick Creek appeared on maps as early as the 1740s.

== See also ==
- List of rivers of Kentucky
