= Sinking Creek (Jessamine County, Kentucky) =

Stream in Jessamine County, Kentucky, U.S.

Coordinates: 37.9872996°N 84.6468877°W

Sinking Creek is a stream in Jessamine County, Kentucky, in the United States.

Sinking Creek was so named because it is a subterranean river for some of its length, disappearing underground before surfacing again.

== See also ==
- List of rivers of Kentucky
