= Sinking Creek (Washington) =

River in Lincoln County, Washington, United States

Coordinates: 47°43′28″N 118°46′54″W

Sinking Creek is a stream in Lincoln County, Washington, in the United States.

Sinking Creek was named for the fact it is a losing stream on its downstream portion.

== See also ==
- List of rivers of Washington (state)
