= Sinking Creek (Breckinridge County, Kentucky) =

Stream in Breckinridge County, Kentucky, U.S.

Coordinates: 37.9153385°N 86.5235905°W

Sinking Creek is a stream in Breckinridge County, Kentucky, in the United States. It is a tributary of the Ohio River.

Sinking Creek was so named because it is a subterranean river for some of its length, disappearing underground before surfacing again.

== See also ==
- List of rivers of Kentucky
