= Laurel River =

River in southeast Kentucky, US

Coordinates: 36°56′46″N 84°17′46″W

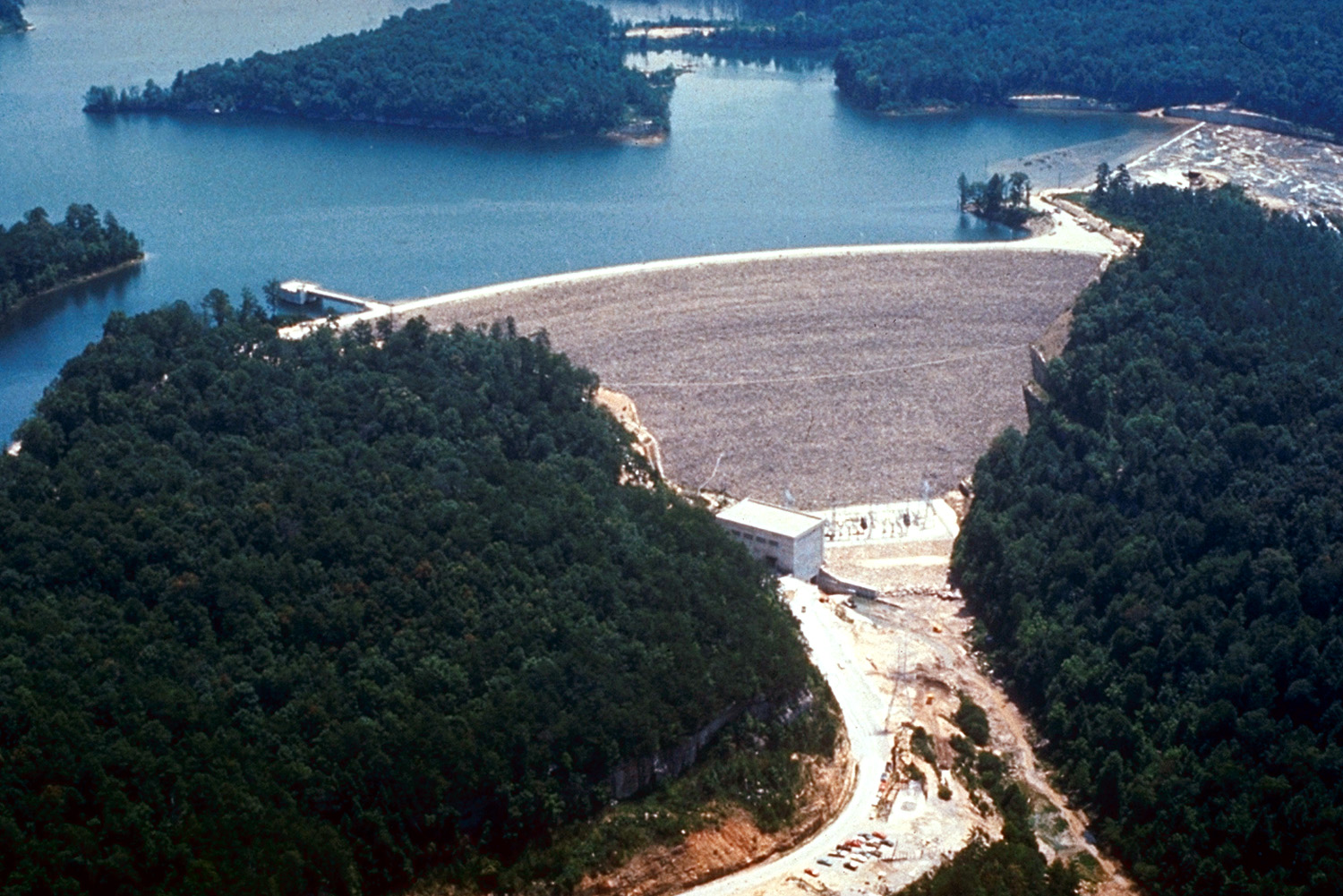

Physical characteristics
- Mouth
  - location: Cumberland River
  - elevation: 722 ft (220 m)
- Length: 42 mi (68 km)
- Basin size: 291 mi^{2} (750 km^{2})
- Discharge
  - location: Corbin, Kentucky
  - average: 338 cu/ft. per sec.

Basin features
- Progression: Cumberland—Ohio—Mississippi

The Laurel River is a 42-mile (68 km) tributary of the Cumberland River in southeast Kentucky in the United States. The river drains a rural region in the foothills of the Appalachian Mountains, in parts of Whitley and Laurel Counties. The town of Corbin is located on the river about 15 miles (24 km) east of its mouth on the Cumberland, and near the confluence with a major tributary, the Little Laurel River.

The river is impounded near its mouth by Laurel River Dam, which forms Laurel River Lake. Completed in 1974 by the U.S. Army Corps of Engineers, the dam and reservoir serve mainly for flood control, although some hydroelectricity is also produced.

The river was likely named for thick growth of laurel along its banks.

== See also ==
- List of rivers of Kentucky
