= Defeat =

Defeat may refer to:

- the opposite of victory
- Debellatio
- Surrender (military) usually follows a defeat

== See also ==
- Defeatism
- Failure
- List of military disasters
