= Tanyard Branch (Salt River tributary) =

River in Missouri, USA

Coordinates: 39.481157°N 91.085416°W

Tanyard Branch is a stream in Pike County in the U.S. state of Missouri. It is a tributary of the Salt River.

Tanyard Branch was so named on account of a historical tanyard near its course.

== See also ==
- List of rivers of Missouri
