= Hell for Certain Branch =

Stream in Pocahontas County, West Virginia, U.S.

Coordinates: 38°18′34″N 80°18′54″W

Hell for Certain Branch is a stream in Pocahontas County, West Virginia, in the United States.

The stream was so named on account of the treacherous terrain in the area. Hell for Certain Branch has been noted for its unusual place name.

== See also ==
- List of rivers of West Virginia
