= Defeated Creek (Knott County, Kentucky) =

Stream in Kentucky, U.S.

Coordinates: 37.21732°N 82.97794°W

Defeated Creek is a stream in Knott County, Kentucky, in the United States.

The stream is a tributary of Carr Creek Lake.

== See also ==
- List of rivers of Kentucky
