= Pendleton County, Kentucky =

County in Kentucky, United States

- County
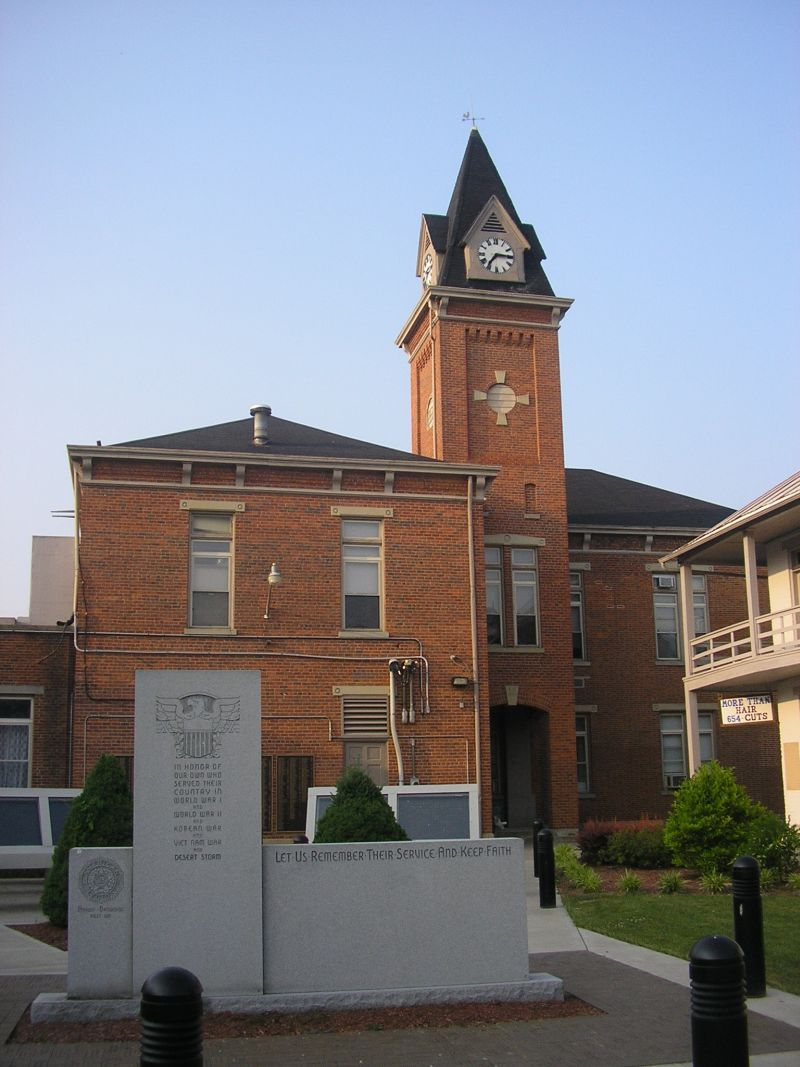
- Pendleton County courthouse in Falmouth

- Location within the U.S. state of Kentucky
- Coordinates: 38°41′N 84°22′W
- Country: United States
- State: Kentucky
- Founded: 1798
- Named for: Edmund Pendleton
- Seat: Falmouth
- Largest city: Falmouth

Government
  - Judge/Executive: David Fields (R)

Area
  - Total: 282 sq mi (730 km^{2})
  - Land: 277 sq mi (720 km^{2})
  - Water: 4.8 sq mi (12 km^{2}) 1.7%

Population (2020)
  - Total: 14,644
  - Estimate (2025): 14,800 ▲
  - Density: 52.9/sq mi (20.4/km^{2})
- Time zone: UTC−5 (Eastern)
  - Summer (DST): UTC−4 (EDT)
- Congressional district: 4th
- Website: pendletoncounty.ky.gov

Pendleton County is a county located in the U.S. state of Kentucky. As of the 2020 census, the population was 14,644. Its county seat is Falmouth. The county was founded December 13, 1798. Pendleton County is included in the Cincinnati-Middletown, OH-KY-IN Metropolitan Statistical Area.

== History ==
Pendleton County was created from parts of Campbell and Bracken counties in 1798. The county was named after Edmund Pendleton, a longtime member of the Virginia House of Burgesses, the Continental Congress and chief justice of Virginia.

Falmouth, the future county seat, began as a settlement called Forks of Licking, c. 1776.

Falmouth was chartered in 1793. Its name originated from the Virginians who settled there from Falmouth, Virginia. It was also in 1793 that one of the first sawmills in Kentucky was built in Falmouth. Falmouth was designated the county seat in 1799. The county courthouse was erected in 1848.

During the American Civil War, the county sent men to both armies. A Union Army recruiting camp was established in Falmouth in September 1861. Two Confederate recruiters were captured and executed by the Union Army in the Peach Grove area of northern Pendleton County. In July 1862, a number of county citizens were rounded up by Union troops during a crackdown against suspected Confederate sympathizers. In June 1863, a number of women were arrested at Demossville because they were believed to be potential spies dangerous to the Federal government. Falmouth was the site of a small skirmish on September 18, 1862, between twenty-eight Confederates and eleven Home Guardsmen.

The city of Butler was established c. 1852 when the Kentucky Central Railroad was built through the area. The city was named for William O. Butler, U.S. congressman from the area, when it was incorporated on February 1, 1868.

== Geography ==
According to the United States Census Bureau, the county has a total area of 282 square miles (730 km^{2}), of which 277 square miles (720 km^{2}) is land and 4.8 square miles (12 km^{2}) (1.7%) is water. The county's northeastern border with Ohio is formed by the Ohio River.

=== Adjacent counties ===
- Kenton County (northwest)
- Campbell County (north)
- Clermont County, Ohio (northeast)
- Bracken County (east)
- Harrison County (south)
- Grant County (west)

== Demographics ==
Historical population
Census	Pop.	Note	%±
1800	1,613		—
1810	3,061		89.8%
1820	3,086		0.8%
1830	3,863		25.2%
1840	4,455		15.3%
1850	6,774		52.1%
1860	10,443		54.2%
1870	14,030		34.3%
1880	16,702		19.0%
1890	16,346		−2.1%
1900	14,947		−8.6%
1910	11,985		−19.8%
1920	11,719		−2.2%
1930	10,876		−7.2%
1940	10,392		−4.5%
1950	9,610		−7.5%
1960	9,968		3.7%
1970	9,949		−0.2%
1980	10,989		10.5%
1990	12,036		9.5%
2000	14,390		19.6%
2010	14,877		3.4%
2020	14,644		−1.6%
2025 (est.)	14,800	▲	1.1%
U.S. Decennial Census; 1790-1960 1900-1990; 1990-2000 2010-2020

=== 2020 census ===
As of the 2020 census, the county had a population of 14,644. The median age was 41.6 years. 23.6% of residents were under the age of 18 and 16.5% of residents were 65 years of age or older. For every 100 females there were 103.0 males, and for every 100 females age 18 and over there were 100.8 males age 18 and over.

The racial makeup of the county was 94.9% White, 0.4% Black or African American, 0.1% American Indian and Alaska Native, 0.2% Asian, 0.0% Native Hawaiian and Pacific Islander, 0.7% from some other race, and 3.6% from two or more races. Hispanic or Latino residents of any race comprised 1.4% of the population.

0.0% of residents lived in urban areas, while 100.0% lived in rural areas.

There were 5,533 households in the county, of which 32.4% had children under the age of 18 living with them and 22.0% had a female householder with no spouse or partner present. About 24.7% of all households were made up of individuals and 11.1% had someone living alone who was 65 years of age or older.

There were 6,263 housing units, of which 11.7% were vacant. Among occupied housing units, 74.7% were owner-occupied and 25.3% were renter-occupied. The homeowner vacancy rate was 1.3% and the rental vacancy rate was 5.6%.

=== 2000 census ===
As of the census of 2000, there were 14,390 people, 5,170 households, and 3,970 families residing in the county. The population density was 51 per square mile (20/km^{2}). There were 5,756 housing units at an average density of 20 per square mile (7.7/km^{2}). The racial makeup of the county was 98.39% White, 0.49% Black or African American, 0.19% Native American, 0.11% Asian, 0.01% Pacific Islander, 0.35% from other races, and 0.44% from two or more races. 0.67% of the population were Hispanic or Latino of any race.

There were 5,170 households, out of which 39.00% had children under the age of 18 living with them, 62.80% were married couples living together, 9.60% had a female householder with no husband present, and 23.20% were non-families. 20.10% of all households were made up of individuals, and 8.30% had someone living alone who was 65 years of age or older. The average household size was 2.75 and the average family size was 3.14.

In the county, the population was spread out, with 28.40% under the age of 18, 8.50% from 18 to 24, 31.20% from 25 to 44, 21.50% from 45 to 64, and 10.40% who were 65 years of age or older. The median age was 34 years. For every 100 females there were 100.30 males. For every 100 females age 18 and over, there were 97.90 males.

The median income for a household in the county was $38,125, and the median income for a family was $42,589. Males had a median income of $31,885 versus $23,234 for females. The per capita income for the county was $16,551. About 9.80% of families and 11.40% of the population were below the poverty line, including 14.80% of those under age 18 and 11.60% of those age 65 or over.

== Education ==
Pendleton County High School, just north of Falmouth, is the public high school. It currently is home to fewer than 1,000 students. The mascot for PCHS is the Wildcat, and the school colors are red, black and white. The school features two gyms and a 450-seat auditorium.

Other schools in the county are Sharp Middle School, named for Phillip Allen Sharp, American geneticist and molecular biologist and winner of the Nobel Prize in Physiology or Medicine (1993) and National Medal of Science (2004), located between Falmouth and Butler, Northern Elementary in Butler, and Southern Elementary in Falmouth.

=== Library ===
Pendleton County Public Library is located at 801 Robbins Avenue, Falmouth. The library provides public access computers with high speed internet and free wifi. The library also offers copying, a fax service, and a public meeting room that can be reserved.

== Politics ==
United States presidential election results for Pendleton County, Kentucky
Year	Republican		Democratic		Third party(ies)	
Year	No.	%	No.	%	No.	%
1912	746	29.83%	1,310	52.38%	445	17.79%
1916	1,206	40.57%	1,728	58.12%	39	1.31%
1920	2,105	44.30%	2,598	54.67%	49	1.03%
1924	2,148	49.71%	2,028	46.93%	145	3.36%
1928	3,196	67.03%	1,567	32.86%	5	0.10%
1932	1,812	39.22%	2,745	59.42%	63	1.36%
1936	1,837	42.61%	2,432	56.41%	42	0.97%
1940	2,029	48.22%	2,165	51.45%	14	0.33%
1944	1,977	48.34%	2,096	51.25%	17	0.42%
1948	1,373	40.18%	1,958	57.30%	86	2.52%
1952	1,993	51.21%	1,895	48.69%	4	0.10%
1956	2,273	54.46%	1,889	45.26%	12	0.29%
1960	2,387	61.46%	1,497	38.54%	0	0.00%
1964	1,313	34.42%	2,495	65.40%	7	0.18%
1968	1,614	45.68%	1,156	32.72%	763	21.60%
1972	1,966	67.28%	909	31.11%	47	1.61%
1976	1,230	35.89%	2,147	62.65%	50	1.46%
1980	1,757	45.45%	1,992	51.53%	117	3.03%
1984	2,767	63.76%	1,529	35.23%	44	1.01%
1988	2,487	60.79%	1,576	38.52%	28	0.68%
1992	1,810	38.77%	1,740	37.27%	1,119	23.97%
1996	2,177	47.20%	1,926	41.76%	509	11.04%
2000	3,044	63.38%	1,670	34.77%	89	1.85%
2004	4,045	67.14%	1,940	32.20%	40	0.66%
2008	3,676	63.36%	2,027	34.94%	99	1.71%
2012	3,556	64.26%	1,859	33.59%	119	2.15%
2016	4,604	76.64%	1,164	19.38%	239	3.98%
2020	5,515	79.64%	1,322	19.09%	88	1.27%
2024	5,593	81.06%	1,210	17.54%	97	1.41%

=== Elected officials ===
Elected officials as of January 3, 2025
U.S. House	Thomas Massie (R)	KY 4
Ky. Senate	Shelley Funke Frommeyer (R)	24
Ky. House	Mark Hart (R)	78

== Culture ==
Pendleton County is home to The Kentucky Wool Festival, Griffin Center Amphitheater, and Kincaid Regional Theatre.

- Phillip Allen Sharp, who earned the Nobel Prize for work that fundamentally changed scientists' understanding of the structure of genes, is a native of Falmouth.
- J. M. Lelen was pastor of St. Francis Xavier Roman Catholic Church in Falmouth for many years in the first half of the 20th century.
- Beth Broderick, actress on Sabrina, the Teenage Witch was born in Falmouth.
- Nate Jones, was drafted in the 5th round, 179th overall, by the Chicago White Sox in the 2007 MLB Draft. He also played for the Cincinnati Reds, the Atlanta Braves, and the Los Angeles Dodgers before retiring.
- Samuel Thomas Hauser, born in Falmouth, was the first resident to become territorial governor of Montana and the seventh territorial governor to that date
- John Merritt coached at Jackson State University from 1953 to 1962 and then at Tennessee State from 1962 through the remainder of his coaching career.

== Communities ==
=== Cities ===
- Butler
- Falmouth (county seat)

=== Unincorporated community ===
- DeMossville

== See also ==
- Bethel Cemetery and Church, a historic frame church 5 miles north of Falmouth
- Fryer House, an 1811 stone house, home of the Pendleton County Historical Society
- National Register of Historic Places listings in Pendleton County, Kentucky
- Stepstone Creek, a creek in Pendleton County, tributary of Slate Creek, flowing into Licking River
