= Squabble Creek (Kentucky) =

Stream in Perry County, Kentucky, U.S.

Coordinates: 37.345924°N 83.469074°W

Squabble Creek is a stream in Perry County, Kentucky, in the United States.

Squabble Creek was so named from a dispute about a deer.

== See also ==
- List of rivers of Kentucky
