= Cedar Creek Lake (Kentucky) =

- Location within Kentucky Location within the United States
- Location: Lincoln County, Kentucky
- Coordinates: 37°28′49″N 84°33′23″W
- Type: reservoir
- Primary inflows: Cedar Creek
- Primary outflows: Cedar Creek
- Catchment area: 14,000 acres (5,700 ha)
- Basin countries: United States
- Surface area: 784 acres (317 ha)
- Average depth: 22 ft (6.7 m)
- Max. depth: 47.56 ft (14.50 m)
- Surface elevation: 873 ft (266 m)

Cedar Creek Lake is a 784-acre (317 ha) reservoir in eastern Lincoln County, Kentucky, USA, between Stanford and Crab Orchard along U.S. Highway 150. Cedar Creek Lake is the second-largest state-controlled lake in Kentucky.

== Project history and information ==
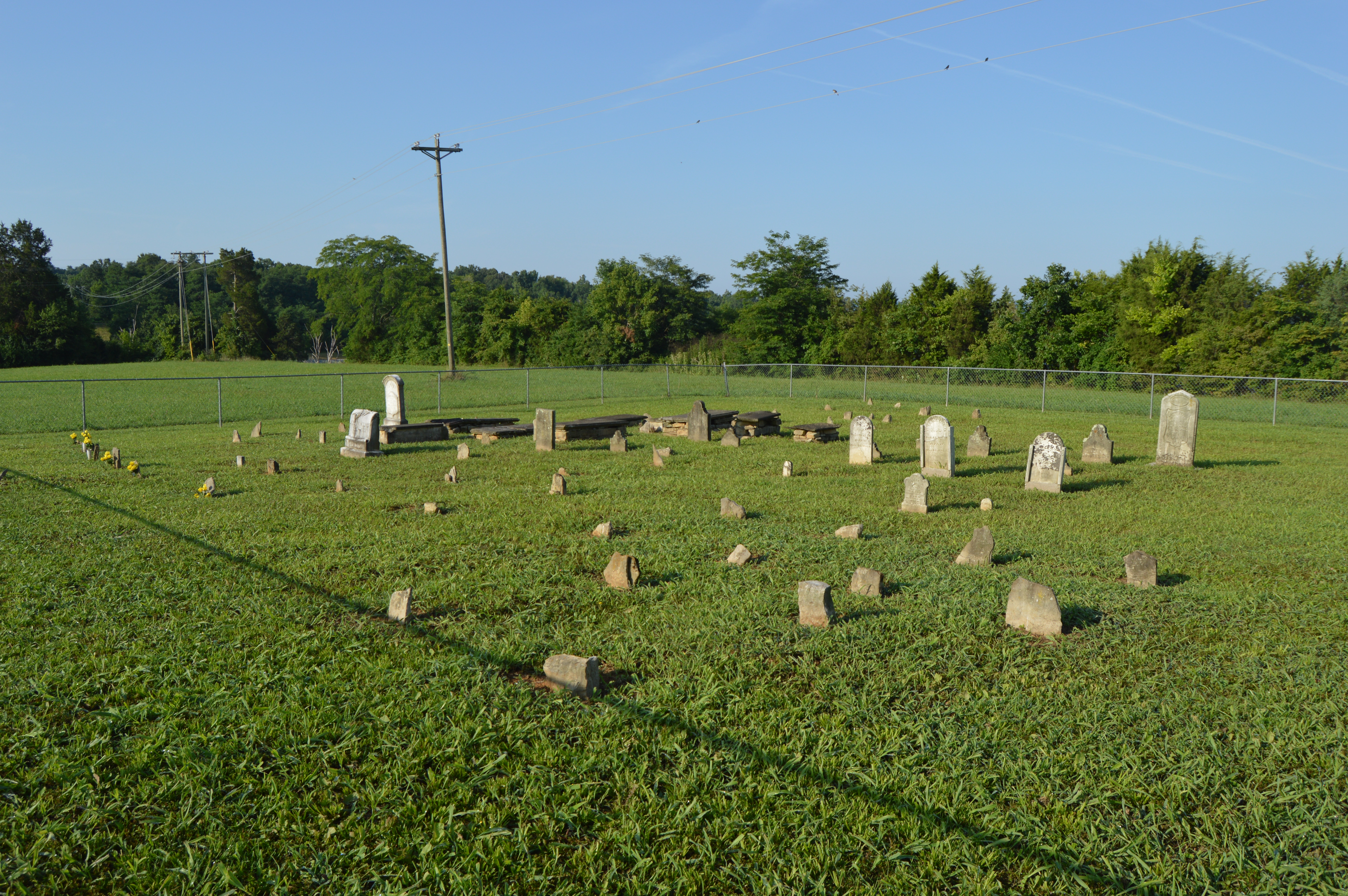
Vardeman-Holmes-Stephenson Cemetery, relocated during lake construction

"This project, first conceived in 1989, will soon result in a recreational and economic jewel for Lincoln County and this region," as said by Kentucky ex-Governor Paul E. Patton during the September 4, 2002, Cedar Creek Dam dedication. Cedar Creek Lake was a joint venture of the Kentucky Department of Fish and Wildlife (KDFW), Kentucky Transportation Cabinet (KYTC), and the leaders of Lincoln County—most importantly ex-Judge-Executive John Sims who envisioned the project. On February 16, 2003, due to excessive amounts of rain, the lake was filled sooner than predicted. This impounded 784 acres (317 ha) of the 14,000-acre (5,700 ha) Cedar Creek watershed, making Cedar Creek Lake the second-largest state-controlled lake in Kentucky (with Lake Malone being the largest). During the preparations for Cedar Creek Lake, it was decided to leave all trees and brush to provide a habitat for the future lake's many species of fish. In areas without trees and brush, cement-filled buckets with arrays of 5-foot-long (1.5 m) wooden sticks protruding out, packaging tarps, anchored downed trees, and other various fish habitat improvement structures were placed to fill in these bald areas. Any developments such as houses and certain sections of old US 150 were removed (except for the old US 150 bridge crossing Cedar Creek). The Hebron Methodist Church, the Vardeman/Holmes/Daws/Stephenson Family Cemetery, and a small section of Kentucky Route 1770 were relocated before the lake's impoundment.

Cedar Creek Lake was included as part of the planning for the reconstruction of the 7.2-mile (11.6 km) section of U.S. Highway 150 (designated the John Sims Highway) between Stanford and Crab Orchard by the KYTC. The construction of the earth-fill dam was at a cost of US$4 million. Of the $4 million, the KYTC paid $3.5 million and Lincoln County paid $0.5 million. The Kentucky Department of Fish and Wildlife paid for the purchase of the 1,600 acres (650 ha) of land needed for the lake at the cost of $4.1 million and paid $300,000 for the lake's three boat ramps, parking facilities, and courtesy docks. Total cost of the project was nearly $8.5 million.

Future developments around Cedar Creek Lake will include a marina and a public beach (no completion date is known at this time).

== Lake statistics ==
- Watershed: 14,000 acres (5,700 ha), primarily agricultural: 45% pastureland, 35% woodland, and 19% cropland.
- Cedar Creek Lake features a larger than usual 300-foot (91 m) buffer zone to prevent private land encroachment problems.

== Lake facilities ==
=== Boat ramps ===
- John Sims Boat Ramp: The main boat ramp of Cedar Creek Lake located where the old Boone Rd becomes submerged. This boat ramp is named after John Sims, a previous Lincoln County Judge-Executive who helped start the Cedar Creek Lake project.
- Old US 150 Boat Ramp: Located at the end of the old US 150 on the west side of the lake.
- Cowan Road Boat Ramp: Located where Cowan Road becomes submerged off Kentucky Route 1770.

=== Bank access ===
- A bank access is located off the small relocated section of Kentucky Route 1770.

=== Future facilities ===
- Marina: Currently in the planning phases and will be built by Lincoln County.
- Public Beach: Currently under construction by Lincoln County.( The beach has been closed since 2012)

== Stock of fish ==
Cedar Creek Lake is inhabited by the following species of fish:

- Bluegill
- Black crappie
- Channel catfish
- Largemouth bass
- Redear sunfish
- Trout
- Smallmouth bass
- Flathead catfish
