= Licking River (Kentucky) =

Coordinates: 39°5′30″N 84°30′13″W

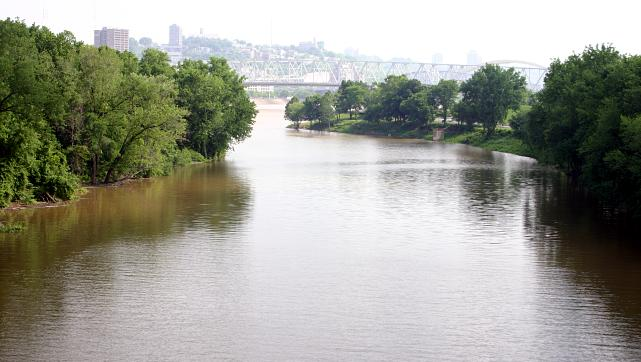
- The mouth of the Licking River, where it joins the Ohio River

Physical characteristics
- Source
  - location: Magoffin County, Kentucky
- Mouth
  - location: Ohio River
- Length: 303 mi (488 km)
- Basin size: 3,709 mi^{2} (9,610 km^{2})
- Discharge
  - location: Alexandria, Kentucky
  - average: 5,694 cu/ft. per sec.

The Licking River is a partly navigable, 303-mile-long (488 km) tributary of the Ohio River in northeastern Kentucky. The river and its tributaries drain much of the region of northeastern Kentucky between the watersheds of the Kentucky River to the west and the Big Sandy River to the east. The North Fork Licking River, in Pendleton County, Kentucky, is one of its tributaries. The South Fork Licking River, in counties including Harrison County, Kentucky, is another.

== Origin of name ==
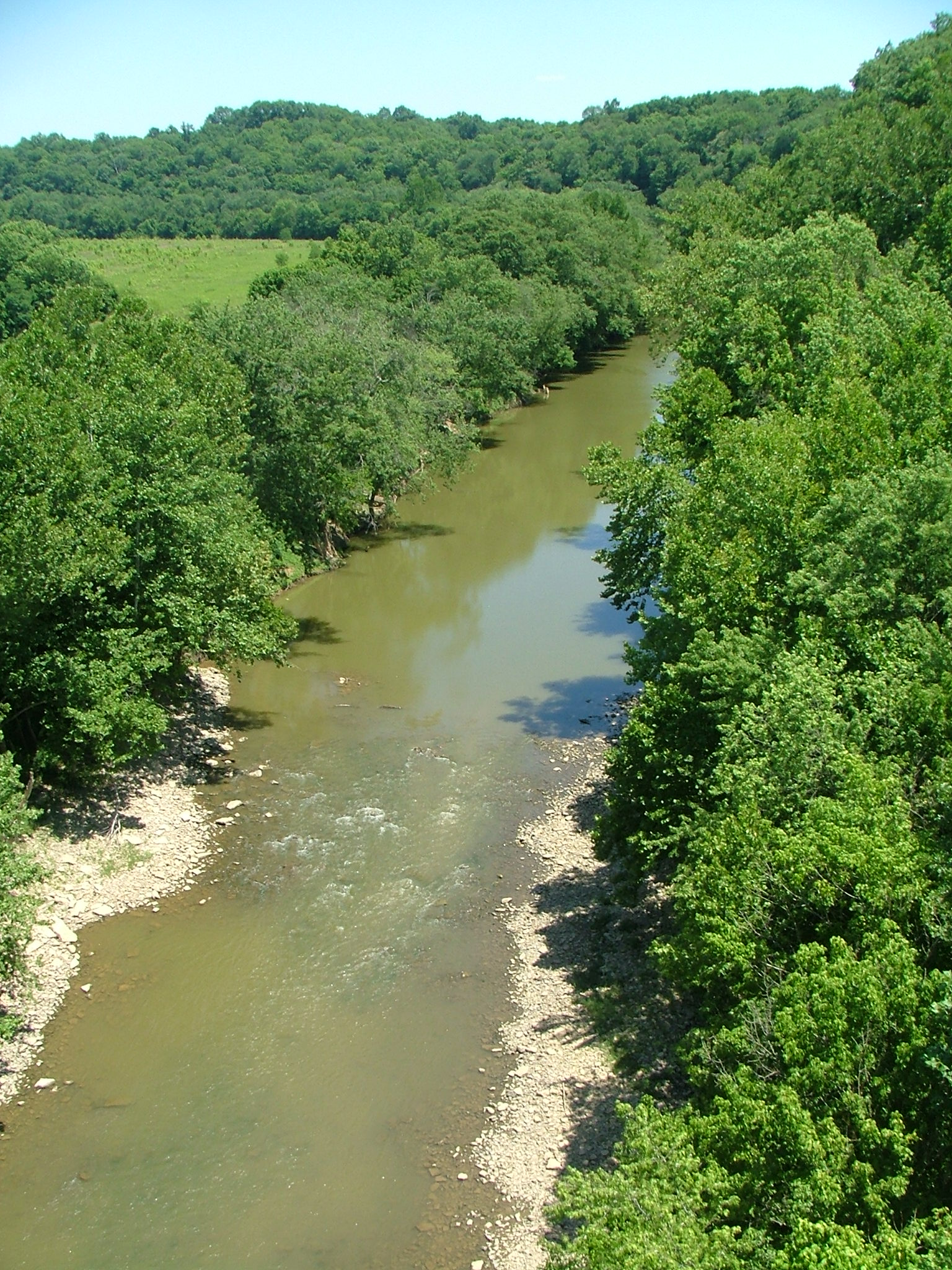
The Licking River near the Blue Licks Battlefield State Park

The Native Americans of the area called the river Nepernine. When the explorer Thomas Walker first saw it in 1750, he called it Frederick's River. An earlier name given by hunters and frontiersmen, Great Salt Lick Creek, makes reference to the many saline springs near the river that attracted animals to its salt licks. The origin of the present name is unclear, though likely related to the previous name.

== History ==
Numerous Native American tribes inhabited the watershed for at least part of the year for several thousand years; Native American tribes that frequently hunted in and around the Licking River valley included the Shawnee and Cherokee. Other, older settlements of unnamed groups in Bath County on Slate Creek are also known. The river served as an important transportation and trade route for both Native Americans and, from the mid-18th Century on, colonists of European descent who began pushing into the area (predominantly from Virginia, Maryland and the Carolina colonies).

In 1780, during the Revolutionary War, a group of American frontiersmen under George Rogers Clark gathered at the river's mouth for their march up the valley of the Little Miami River, where they conducted operations against British outposts and British-supported Native American tribes, including elements of the Shawnee, Miami, Mingo and Delaware. In 1782, the river was the site of the Battle of Blue Licks. The Newport Barracks in Newport guarded its mouth from 1803 to 1894.

The Licking River is now used extensively for recreation, including shallow-draft boating, canoeing and fishing. It is used for rowing practice by the Cincinnati Junior Rowing Club.

== Course ==
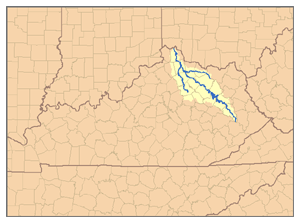
The watershed of the Licking River, with the North Fork and South Fork Licking River tributaries

The Licking River rises in the Cumberland Plateau of eastern Kentucky, in southeastern Magoffin County (37°31'16"N 82°55'56"W) at the confluence of two smaller streams and an elevation of 1006 feet. It flows northwest in a highly meandering course past Salyersville and West Liberty. In Rowan County in the Daniel Boone National Forest it is impounded to form the large Cave Run Lake reservoir. Northwest of the reservoir it receives Fleming Creek approximately 8 miles (13 km) northwest of Carlisle and flows across the Bluegrass region of northern Kentucky. It receives the North Fork Licking River from the east approximately 10 miles (16 km) northwest of Mount Olivet and the South Fork Licking River from the south at Falmouth. It joins the Ohio opposite Cincinnati, where it separates the cities of Covington and Newport. The river was used as the southwestern border of the original Mason County and is the southwest border of Fleming and Rowan counties today.

== Flora and fauna ==
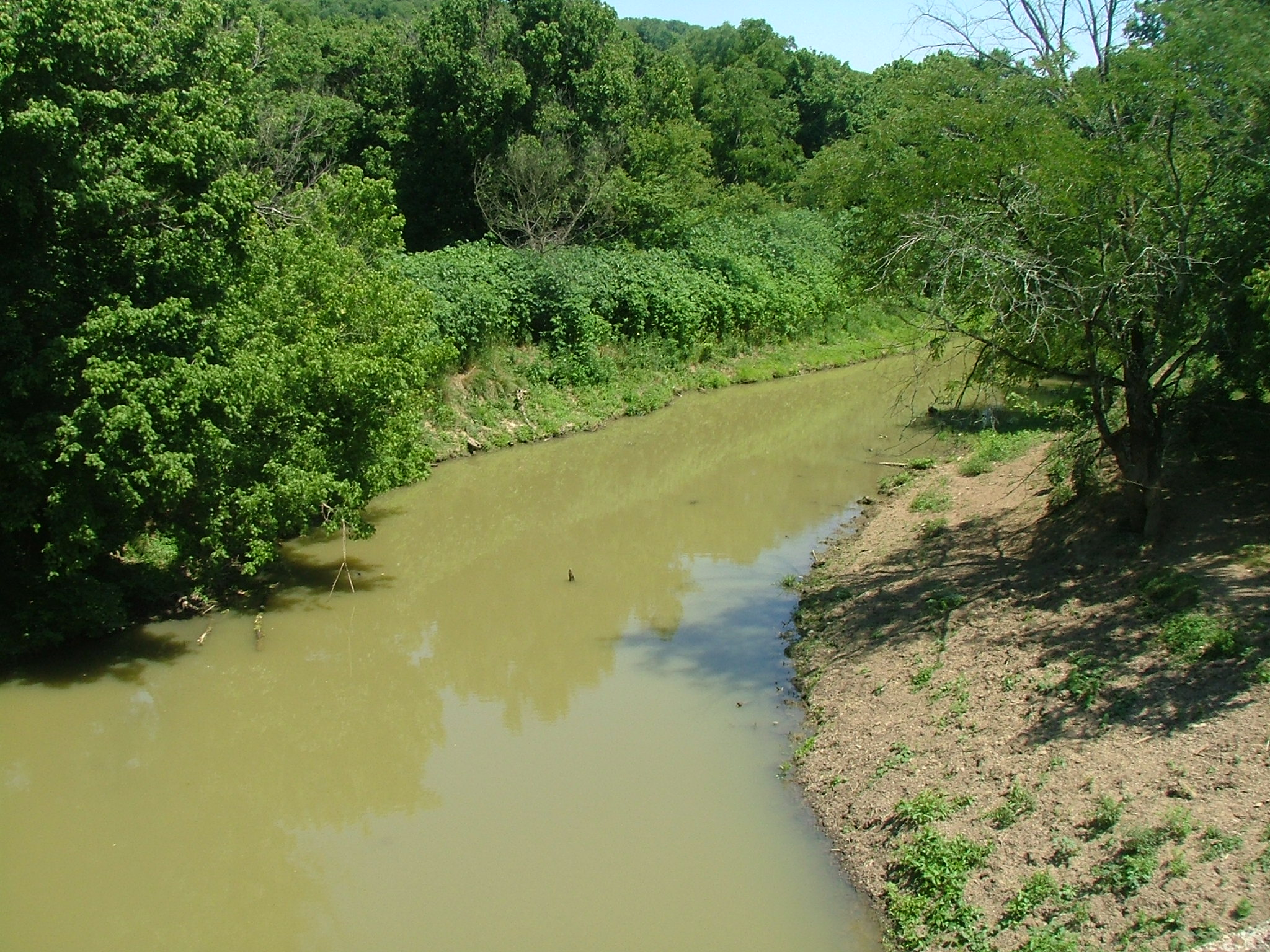
The North Fork near Mays Lick

The river is considered by ecologists to provide a unique ecosystem in the region. The lower river is considered to be a habitat for the relatively rare native muskellunge. The river basin supports several other fish species, including: redside dace, mimic shiner, streamline chub, slender madtom, blue sucker, paddlefish, and eastern sand darter. There are more than 50 species of freshwater mussels, of which 11 are endangered. The watershed provides wetland stopover habitats for about 250 species of migratory birds, an unusually high number. Several state and federal agencies, as well as private organizations such as The Nature Conservancy work to protect the diversity of this important habitat.

The largest common carp taken in the state of Kentucky (54 lbs., 14 oz.) was caught in the South Fork of the Licking River.

== See also ==
- List of rivers of Kentucky
