= Squabble Creek (Texas) =

Stream in Rockwall County, Texas, U.S.

- Location within Texas Location within the United States

Physical characteristics
- Source
  - coordinates: 32.9237337°N 96.4358191°W
- Mouth
  - coordinates: 32.9420666°N 96.5022106°W

Squabble Creek is a stream in Rockwall County, Texas, in the United States.

Squabble Creek once carried much more water before overuse of groundwater caused the creek to often run dry. Its springs are near the Ralph M. Hall municipal airport, while its mouth is near the Rockwall Golf and Athletic Club. During the summer or during low lake levels, the creek often does not reach the lake. It has a length of 4.2 miles.

== See also ==
- List of rivers of Texas
