= Defeated Creek (Letcher County, Kentucky) =

Stream in Kentucky, U.S.

Coordinates: 37.053149°N 82.988773°W

Defeated Creek is a stream in Letcher County, Kentucky, in the United States.

According to tradition, Defeated Creek was so named when pioneer hunters were robbed of their fur pelts by Indians at the site.

== See also ==
- List of rivers of Kentucky
