= Tallega, Kentucky =

Unincorporated community in Kentucky, United States

- Unincorporated community
- Location in Kentucky Location in the United States
- Coordinates: 37°33′37″N 83°35′25″W
- Country: United States
- State: Kentucky
- County: Lee
- Elevation: 705 ft (215 m)
- Time zone: UTC-5 (Eastern (EST))
  - Summer (DST): UTC-4 (EDT)
- ZIP codes: 41378
- GNIS feature ID: 509181

Tallega is an unincorporated community in Lee County, Kentucky, United States. Its post office closed in 1994.
