= Kentucky River =

River in Kentucky, United States

Coordinates: 38°41′0″N 85°11′18″W

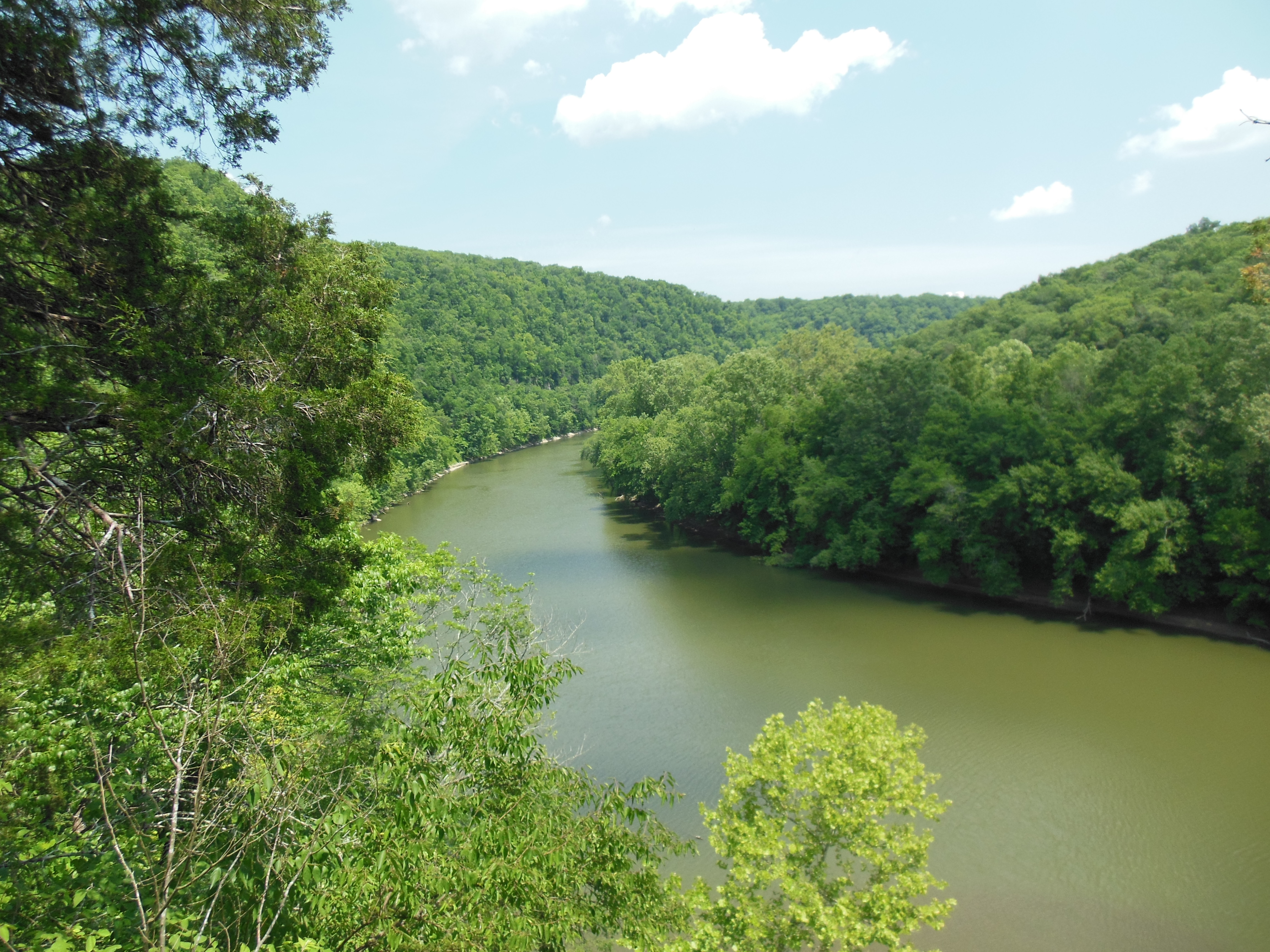
- The Kentucky River Palisades at Raven Run Park

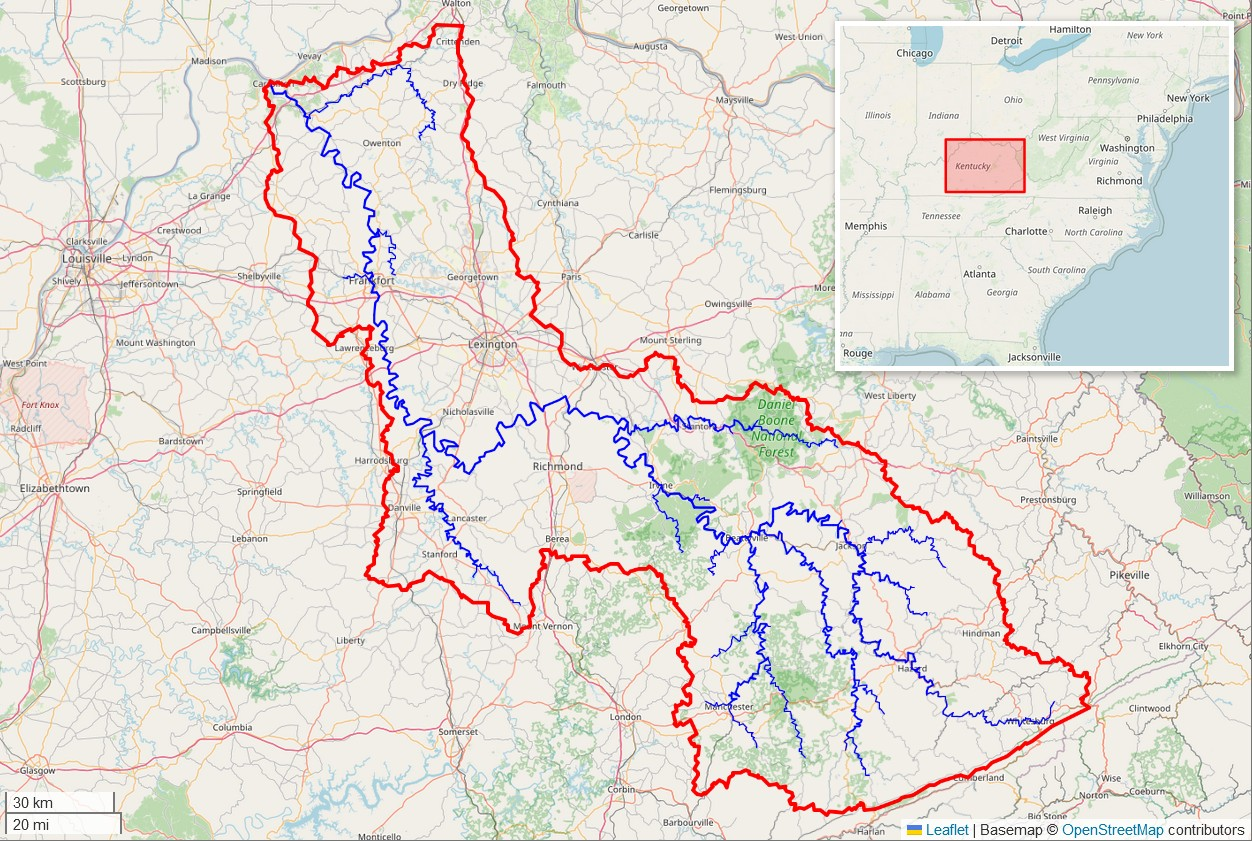
- Kentucky River watershed (Interactive map)

Location
- Country: United States
- State: Kentucky

Physical characteristics
- Source
  - location: Beattyville
  - elevation: 669 ft (204 m)
- Mouth
  - location: Ohio River at Carrollton
- Length: 263 mi (423 km)
- Basin size: 6,989 sq mi (18,100 km^{2})
- Discharge
  - location: Lockport
  - average: 8,924 cu ft/s (252.7 m^{3}/s), USGS water years 1977-2019

The Kentucky River is a tributary of the Ohio River in Kentucky, United States. The 260-mile (420 km) river and its tributaries drain much of eastern and central Kentucky, passing through the Eastern Coalfield, the Cumberland Mountains, and the Bluegrass region. Its watershed encompasses about 7,000 square miles (18,000 km^{2}), and it supplies drinking water to about one-sixth of the population of the state.

The river is no longer navigable above Lock 4 at Frankfort, as concrete bulkheads have been poured behind the upper lock gates of Locks 5–14 to strengthen the dam structures. All fourteen dams are managed by the state-run Kentucky River Authority. The primary importance of the locks today is to maintain a pool that allows the city of Lexington to draw its drinking water from the river. Although the Lexington area receives well over 40 inches (1,000 mm) of precipitation annually, the limestone karst geology of the area allows little natural surface water.

The cities of Winchester, Beattyville, Irvine, Richmond, Lancaster, Nicholasville, Harrodsburg, Wilmore, Versailles, Lawrenceburg, and Frankfort also draw water from the river for their municipal water supplies. It is estimated that more than 700,000 people depend on the river for water.

== Description ==
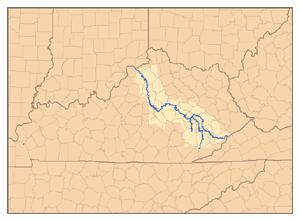
Watershed of the Kentucky River, showing the North Fork, Middle Fork, and South Fork tributaries.

The main stem of the Kentucky River is formed near Beattyville in Lee County by the confluence of the North, Middle, and South Forks. The river flows generally northwest, in a highly meandering course through the Eastern Coalfield and the Daniel Boone National Forest before turning southwest north of Richmond and then north through Frankfort. It joins the Ohio River at Carrollton.

Approximately 15 miles (24 km) southeast of Boonesborough, the Kentucky is joined by the Red River. Approximately 20 miles (32 km) west of Boonesborough, it is joined by Silver Creek. At High Bridge, it is joined by the Dix River. At Frankfort, it is joined by Benson Creek; this confluence was the junction of Kentucky's three original counties. At Monterey, approximately 10 miles (16 km) north of Frankfort, it is joined by Elkhorn Creek, which drains much of the Inner Bluegrass region.

Between Clays Ferry in Madison County and Frankfort, the river passes through the Kentucky River Palisades, a series of dramatic steep gorges approximately 100 miles (160 km) in length.

== Forks ==
The Kentucky River has three major forks: the North, Middle, and South Forks. The Middle and North Forks join near Beattyville to form the Kentucky River, which is joined in turn just downstream of Beattyville by the South Fork. The area between the confluence of the North and Middle Forks and where the South Fork joins is known locally as The Three Forks Country. Between them, the three forks drain nearly 3/5 of the 4,423-square-mile (114.6 Ma) central portion of the Eastern Kentucky Coalfield area.

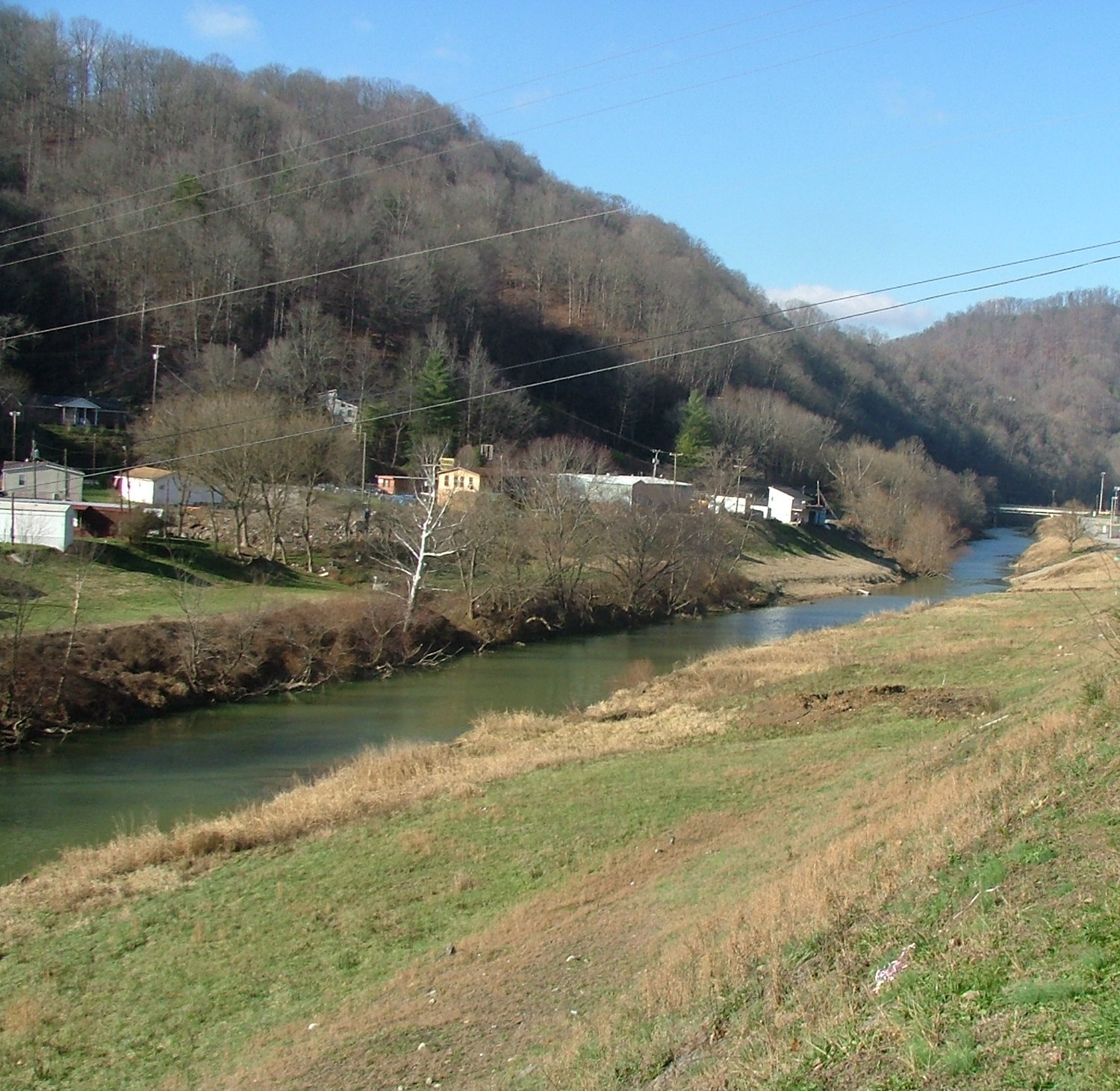
The North Fork near Combs.

The North Fork Kentucky River is approximately 168 miles (270 km) long. At Airdale, the North Fork has a mean average discharge of approximately 863 cubic feet per second, per data collected during the period 1930–1942.

The Middle Fork Kentucky River is approximately 105 miles (169 km) long. At Tallega, the Middle Fork has a mean annual discharge of 792 cubic feet per second.

The South Fork Kentucky River is approximately 45 miles (72 km) long. At Booneville, the South Fork has a mean annual discharge of 1,052 cubic feet per second.

== Floods ==
The Kentucky River basin is subject to regular flooding caused by high rainfall. The river's narrow valley and surrounding rocky terrain cause rainwater to run off into many ephemeral creeks rather than being absorbed into the soil. Much of the built environment in the area is located along the creek beds.

Kentucky River flooding has been recorded since the early 1800s. Swiss immigrant and lock-keeper Frank Wurtz recorded floods from 1867 on and spoke with local farmers to learn of earlier ones in 1817, 1832, 1847, and 1854. Wurtz documented the floods of 1867, 1880, and 1883, which he claims was five feet higher than the high tide of the 1847 flood. The waters of the 1883 flood washed his post away.

On January 1, 1919, the waters rose ten feet in as many hours at Frankfort, causing damage to many smaller towns along the river. In November of the same year, the waters rose three feet in one hour at Frankfort. In 1920, flooding caused the sewers in Frankfort to back up. There was also major flooding in early 1924 and late December 1926.

Flooding in 1927 caused widespread damage to the Kentucky River basin in communities such as Neon, Whitesburg, and Hazard. Hundreds of people were forced from their homes.

=== Flooding and flood control in the 1930s ===
The Kentucky River basin endured many floods during the Great Depression. An Ohio River flood in 1936 backed into the lower Kentucky; the crest reached 42.7 feet (13.0 m) high and flooded half of Frankfort, completely isolating the city. 12,000 square miles (31,000 km^{2}) of the Ohio Valley were flooded in all.

Severe flooding in 1937, exacerbated by cold weather, resulted in civil unrest. In the Kentucky State Reformatory at Frankfort, the water rose to 6 feet (1.8 m) in the walls. With the downstairs population moving up a floor, racial tensions erupted. 24 prisoners tried to escape, but after a warning shot was fired, only one man left. No clean water or food was left in the prison, so authorities moved the population of 2,900 to the "feeble-minded institute" on the hill next to the prison. Carpenters were brought in to build small, temporary housing units. The National Guard was brought in to oversee the makeshift prison. The prisoners considered to be too dangerous for the setting were sent to Lawrenceburg and Lexington. Governor Happy Chandler successfully pushed for a new reformatory to be built in La Grange.

While the public was still dealing with the effects of the flooding, Kentucky Utilities opened the Dix Dam spillways, which added 3 feet (0.91 m) to the floodwaters. In Mercer County, the ferry to Woodford County washed away and was never replaced. A flood in 1939 rose slightly higher in Hazard than the flood in 1937.

Residents of the Kentucky River watershed demanded the federal government do more to control floods. Kentucky Hydro-Electric had begun pushing as early as 1925 for a 162-foot (49 m) dam 1 mile (1.6 km) above Booneville on the South Fork, but this proposal was unpopular as the dam would create a reservoir backing up the South Fork for over 28 miles (45 km).

In 1939, President Franklin D. Roosevelt signed the Flood Control Act of 1938, which authorized the construction or study of many dams and reservoirs by the Army Corps of Engineers. Only two small lakes, Carr Fork and Buckhorn, were created in the Kentucky River watershed. The most controversial project, a Red River dam that would have flooded most of the river's gorge, was ultimately abandoned in 1975.

=== January and February 1957 ===
The Kentucky River basin, including the three Forks and their tributaries, suffered a major flood in January and February 1957, although that did not exceed the highest on record on North Fork (and on its tributary Troublesome Creek), the Goose Creek tributary of South Fork, and Carr Fork, all of which had had higher local floods at that point. The 1957 flood also affected the Big Sandy River, the Cumberland River, and the Tennessee River. The total cost of damages was estimated at US$15,000,000 (equivalent to $167,932,464 in 2024) in the Kentucky River basin, out of US$52,000,000 (equivalent to $582,165,877 in 2024) across Kentucky as a whole.

It also affected south-western West Virginia, western Virginia, and north-eastern Tennessee, but Kentucky state was the hardest hit. In part this was because of the physical geography of the area, as aforementioned.

There had been 1 to 2 inches (2.5 to 5.1 cm) of rainfall a week before the floods, which had saturated the ground and filled streams to their median levels, and in the period from the 27th of January to the 2nd of February there was 4 to 9 inches (10 to 23 cm) of rainfall. The highest rainfall of the floods within Kentucky state was measured in the Pikeville area, with 6 to 9 inches (15 to 23 cm) over much of the flood area and 12.5 inches (32 cm) at the headwaters of Middle Fork.

The highest peak river discharges then on record were measured along all three Forks of the Kentucky River.

There were no early warnings of the floods, as communications were disrupted. Approximately 7,700 telephones and 103 long-distance telephone lines were taken out of service. Most people had to evacuate their homes rapidly without time to transport their possessions. Water supplies were contaminated, natural gas supplies were cut off making it difficult to cook, and food shortages occurred because of damage to food stocks on people's homes and in local stores.

President Eisenhower declared the region a disaster area. The Red Cross, one of several relief organizations that came to aid alongside the federal and state governments, reported the destruction of 597 homes, major damage to another 2,932 homes, and minor damage to a further 8,740. Nine people died. Several rural school buildings were entirely destroyed, and many others were closed either because of damage or because transportation disruption meant that people simply could not get to them. The most costly school loss was the State Vocational School at Hazard (US$37,300 (equivalent to $417,592 in 2024)), with the rest of Perry County having some US$85,000 (equivalent to $951,617 in 2024) worth of damage to other schools, and Floyd County having US$308,000 (equivalent to $3,448,213 in 2024) worth of damage to its schools.

Highway damage made transport of relief supplies difficult, with the United States Army sending in 14 helicopters for transport of supplies, headquartered at London. Approximately 900 mines and manufacturing industries, and 90% of the coal mines in Perry, Letcher, Floyd, and Pike Counties, were shut down. Ninety-six cable-suspended footbridges providing access to highways were destroyed.

== Recreation ==
The river provides excellent fishing. The largest goldeye ever taken in the state of Kentucky (2.04 pounds or 0.93 kilograms) was caught in the Kentucky River in 2001, as was the 65.06-pound (29.51 kg) state-record bighead carp, caught in 2020.

== See also ==
- List of rivers of Kentucky
