= Reed House =

Reed House may refer to:

in the United States

(by state then city)

- William Reed House, Birmingham, Alabama, listed on the National Register of Historic Places (NRHP) in Birmingham
- Will Reed Farm House, Alleene, Arkansas
- Reed House (Leipsic, Delaware)
- Jehu Reed House, Little Heaven, Delaware
- Mrs. Kersey Coates Reed House, Lake Forest, Illinois
- Reed-Dossey House, Brownsville, Kentucky
- Frederick Reed House, Falmouth, Kentucky, NRHP-listed in Pendleton County
- Newdigate-Reed House, Maysville, Kentucky
- Reed Farmstead Log Dependencies, Husser, Louisiana, NRHP-listed in Tangipahoa Parish
- G. W. Reed Travellers Home, Benton, Maine
- Philo Reed House, Fort Fairfield, Maine
- Thomas Brackett Reed House, Portland, Maine
- Robert Reed House, Woolrich, Maine
- Col. Isaac G. Reed House, Waldoboro, Maine
- Reed's Creek Farm, Centreville, Maryland
- Fowle-Reed-Wyman House, Arlington, Massachusetts
- Reed-Wood Place, Littleton, Massachusetts
- Reed and Barton Complex, Taunton, Massachusetts
- Frank Reed Three-Decker, Worcester, Massachusetts
- Timothy Reed House, Quincy, Massachusetts
- Pleasant Reed House, Biloxi, Mississippi
- Reed Log House, Eminence, Missouri
- Wilber T. Reed House, Auburn, Nebraska
- Mary Reed House, Omaha, Nebraska, listed as an Omaha Landmark
- Isaac Reed House, Newport, New Hampshire
- Samuel Harrison Reed House, Asheville, North Carolina
- James Reed House, Fredericktown, Ohio, NRHP-listed in Knox County
- Henry Reed, Jr., House, Maumee, Ohio, NRHP-listed in Lucas County
- C.A. Reed House, Ravenna, Ohio, NRHP-listed in Portage County
- Reed-Wells House, Portland, Oregon
- Rosamond Coursen and Walter R. Reed House, Portland, Oregon
- Samuel G. Reed House, Portland, Oregon
- Charles Manning Reed Mansion, Erie, Pennsylvania
- Reed House, now called Davis Memorial Hall at Washington & Jefferson College, in Washington, Pennsylvania
- Brame-Reed House, Shelbyville, Tennessee
- Thomas B. Reed House, Houston, Texas, NRHP-listed in Harris County
- Walter Reed Birthplace, Belroi, Virginia

== See also ==
- Reed Hall, Emsworth, Pennsylvania, part of Dixmont State Hospital, NRHP-listed
- Reid House (disambiguation)
