= National Register of Historic Places listings in Pendleton County, Kentucky =

Location of Pendleton County in Kentucky

This is a list of the National Register of Historic Places listings in Pendleton County, Kentucky.

This is intended to be a complete list of the properties and districts on the National Register of Historic Places in Pendleton County, Kentucky, United States. The locations of National Register properties and districts for which the latitude and longitude coordinates are included below may be seen on a map.

There are 20 properties and districts listed on the National Register in the county. Another property was once listed but has been removed.

This National Park Service list is complete through NPS recent listings posted May 1, 2026.

== Current listings ==
	Name on the Register	Image	Date listed	Location	City or town	Description
1	Dolph Aluck Smokehouse		January 8, 1987 (#87000162)	Milford Rd. 38°35′31″N 84°12′19″W	Falmouth	
2	Leslie T. Applegate House	Leslie T. Applegate House	March 4, 1983 (#83002845)	410 Maple St. 38°40′32″N 84°20′00″W	Falmouth	
3	Bishop House	Bishop House	March 4, 1983 (#83002846)	200 4th St. 38°40′35″N 84°19′55″W	Falmouth	
4	Central Falmouth Historic District	Central Falmouth Historic District	March 4, 1983 (#83002847)	Roughly bounded by Shelby, 2nd, Montjoy, and Main Sts. 38°40′40″N 84°19′51″W	Falmouth	
5	Charity's House	Charity's House	March 4, 1983 (#83002848)	108 Montjoy St. 38°40′46″N 84°19′56″W	Falmouth	Vernacular house built soon after 1845 by freed slave Charity Southgate, from whom most of Falmouth's black population was descended.
6	Chipman House	Chipman House	March 4, 1983 (#83002849)	901 Shelby St. 38°40′45″N 84°20′13″W	Falmouth	
7	Henry Colvin House		January 8, 1987 (#87000145)	Colvin Bend Rd. 38°36′51″N 84°15′31″W	McKinneysburg	
8	Fryer House	Fryer House	October 8, 1976 (#76000938)	Northeast of Butler on U.S. Route 27; 38°47′37″N 84°21′09″W	Butler	
9	House at 206 Park Street	House at 206 Park Street	March 4, 1983 (#83002850)	206 Park St. 38°40′43″N 84°20′01″W	Falmouth	
10	Elzey Hughes House	Elzey Hughes House	March 4, 1983 (#83002851)	308 2nd St. 38°40′44″N 84°19′56″W	Falmouth	
11	Immaculate Conception Catholic Church and Cemetery	Immaculate Conception Catholic Church and Cemetery	January 28, 1987 (#86003729)	Stepstone Rd. 38°50′28″N 84°15′52″W	Peach Grove	
12	George W. Jameson House	George W. Jameson House	March 4, 1983 (#83002852)	306 Park St. 38°40′41″N 84°20′02″W	Falmouth	
13	Kellum House	Kellum House	March 4, 1983 (#83002853)	714 Shelby St. 38°40′46″N 84°20′12″W	Falmouth	
14	McBride House	McBride House	March 4, 1983 (#83002854)	401 Main St. 38°40′32″N 84°19′52″W	Falmouth	
15	Pendleton House	Pendleton House	March 4, 1983 (#83002856)	506 W. Shelby St. 38°40′42″N 84°20′04″W	Falmouth	
16	Frederick Reed House	Frederick Reed House	March 4, 1983 (#83002857)	405 Broad St. 38°40′28″N 84°19′45″W	Falmouth	
17	Seaman Sisters' House	Seaman Sisters' House	March 4, 1983 (#83002858)	706 Shelby St. 38°40′45″N 84°20′10″W	Falmouth	
18	Sheehan House		March 4, 1983 (#83002859)	206 N. Maple St. 38°40′45″N 84°19′52″W	Falmouth	House built c.1870 moved to this site in 1893. By 2013 the house has been moved again or demolished.
19	Southgate House		March 4, 1983 (#83002860)	106 Montjoy St. 38°40′46″N 84°19′56″W	Falmouth	
20	Watson Store	Watson Store	March 4, 1983 (#83002861)	504 W. Shelby St. 38°40′42″N 84°20′02″W	Falmouth	

== Former listing ==
	Name on the Register	Image	Date listed	Date removed	Location	City or town	Description
1	Oldham Plantation	Oldham Plantation	March 4, 1983 (#83002855)	June 24, 2005	Kentucky Route 159	Falmouth	

== See also ==
- List of National Historic Landmarks in Kentucky
- National Register of Historic Places listings in Kentucky
