= Bishop House =

Bishop House may refer to:

== India ==
- Bishop House (Kolkata, India), a place of interest in Kolkata

== Russia ==
- Bishop House (Taganrog), a historic building in Taganrog, Rostov Oblast

== United States ==
(by state)

- Meigs-Bishop House, Madison, Connecticut, listed on the National Register of Historic Places (NRHP) in New Haven County
- Bishop House (Athens, Georgia), listed on the NRHP in Clarke County
- Bishop House (Falmouth, Kentucky), listed on the NRHP in Pendleton County
- Bishop House (New Brunswick, New Jersey), listed on the NRHP in Middlesex County
- Coor-Bishop House, New Bern, North Carolina, listed on the NRHP in Craven County
- McCormic-Bishop House, Paris, Texas, listed on the NRHP in Lamar County
- Bishop House (Graysontown, Virginia), listed on the NRHP in Montgomery County
- Bishop House (Casper, Wyoming), listed on the NRHP in Natrona County

== See also ==
- Bishops House (disambiguation), covers variations with "Bishop's", "Bishops'"
