= Henry Greenebaum =

German-born Jewish-American banker (1833–1914)

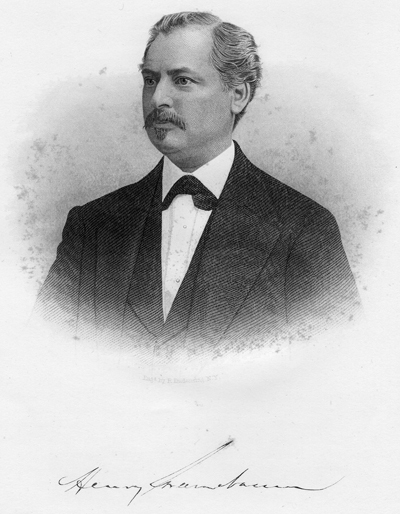
Henry Greenebaum

Henry Greenebaum (June 18, 1833 – February 2, 1914) was a German-born Jewish-American banker.

== Life ==
Greenebaum was born on June 18, 1833, in Eppelsheim, the Grand Duchy of Hesse, near the city of Worms and the Rhine River. He was the son of merchant Jacob Greenebaum and Sarah Hart. His maternal cousins were the Hart Brothers, prominent Chicago wholesale merchants.

Greenebaum attended the local school until he was twelve, after which he went to the "Real Schule" in Alzey for a year and a half. He then went to the "Pro-Gymnasium," a Latin school in Kaiserslautern. He graduated from there in 1848. His father wanted him to take full collegiate courses and engage in the learned professions, but two of Greenebaum's older brothers who already immigrated to America convinced him to join him. In October 1848, when he was fifteen, he arrived in America and settled in Chicago, Illinois. He initially worked as a hardware salesman for W. F. Dominick for two years. He then worked as a clerk in the banking house of General R. K. Swift for four years, at one point making a business trip to Europe to make business connections for his employer.

In January 1855, Greenebaum and his brother Elias established their own banking house, Greenebaum Brothers, which was Chicago's oldest European banking institution. He later presided over the firm, which was renamed Henry Greenebaum & Co, and ran it with David S. Greenebaum and Louis Rullmann. In 1856, he was elected to the Chicago City Council as an Alderman of the Sixth Ward. He declined a renomination for the City Council. A personal friend and admirer of Senator Stephen Douglas, the Democratic Party nominated him their candidate as presidential elector for Douglas in the 1860 presidential election. When the American Civil War began, he became a Republican and worked to raise and provide the regiments with men and equipment. In 1867, Governor Richard J. Oglesby appointed him a member of the State Board of Equalization. He was a Republican presidential elector-at-large in the 1872 presidential election. He declined a previous nomination for Lieutenant Governor of Illinois and for Mayor of Chicago. He was the first Jew to sit on the Chicago City Council. A patron of the arts, he was the first president of the Beethoven Society in 1876 and first president of the Orpheus Maennerchor.

Greenebaum actively supported European immigration to Chicago, especially German immigrants. In 1860, he was a founder and active supporter of the Chicago Industrial Association, a group of business leaders focused on developing home industry and on immigration matters. By 1863, his bank had a Passage Office where local residents could pay passage for their friends and family to immigrate from Europe to Chicago. In 1870 and 1871, he formed the German Savings Bank and the German National Bank and controlled minority interests of the banks via his banking company and as a personal shareholder. His banks were housed in the same building, and while the building was destroyed in the 1871 Great Chicago Fire he financed a new building for his holdings within a few months. His banks were largely unaffected by the Panic of 1873. In 1877, he was indicted for committing fraud as treasurer of the West Chicago Park Commission, his banks were declared bankrupt, and he declared personal bankruptcy. In 1878, he was put on trial for embezzlement. That trial continued until early 1879 and fizzled out, but there was a congressional investigation that led to a second indictment in late 1879. That trial concluded in 1880 and found him not guilty, but by then he largely lost his previous standing and capital. In 1882, he became General Agent for the Equitable Life Assurance Company.

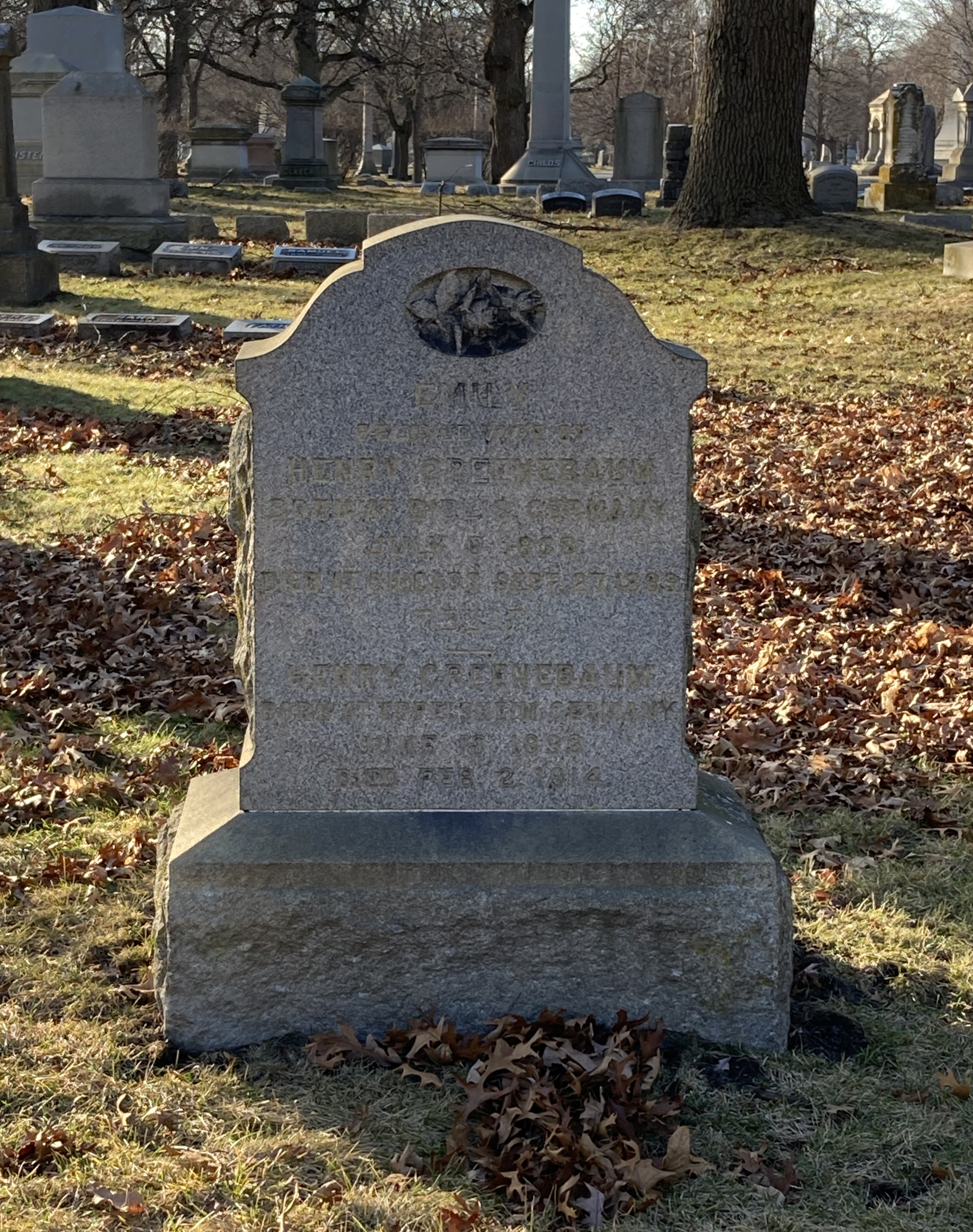
Greenebaum's grave at Rosehill Cemetery

In 1861, Greenebaum and his brother Elias were among the founders of the Sinai Congregation. He served as the first president of the Isaiah Congregation, also known as the Zion Congregation, which was founded in 1864. He was also secretary and honorary member of Congregation B'nai Sholom. In 1859, he was a founder and first president of the United Hebrew Relief Association, the first agency to centralize Jewish charitable activities in Chicago. He was president of the German Aid Society in 1856. In the 1890s, he was an executive committee member of the Russian Aid Society, which assisted Russian immigrants. He organized the B'nai B'rith Ramah Lodge No. 33 in 1857, and in 1864 he became the first head of the B'nai B'rith District Grand Lodge No. 6. He also helped establish the Chicago Public Library, the Chicago Historical Society, and the Astronomical Society, and served as a trustee of the Old University of Chicago.

In 1855, Greenebaum married Emily Hyman. Their only child, George Washington, died on his first birthday. They raised several orphan children of relatives.

Greenebaum died at home on February 2, 1914. His funeral took place in Sinai Temple and was officiated by Emil G. Hirsch and Joseph Stolz. The pallbearers included Adolf Kraus and Abraham G. Becker. He was buried in Rosehill Cemetery.
