= Read House =

Read House may refer to:

- Read House & Gardens, New Castle, Delaware, operated by Delaware Historical Society
- Cheney Read House, Cambridge, Massachusetts, listed on the National Register of Historic Places (NRHP)
- Nathan Read House, Fall River, Massachusetts, NRHP-listed
- Jones-Read-Touvelle House, Wauseon, Ohio, NRHP-listed
- The Read House Hotel, Chattanooga, TN, listed on the NRHP in Hamilton County, Tennessee
- Rastus-Read House, Lufkin, Texas, listed on the NRHP in Angelina County, Texas

== See also ==
- Read School (disambiguation)
- Reid House (disambiguation)
