= Bishop's House =

Bishops House or Bishop's House or Bishops' House may refer to:

== Australia ==
- Bishop's House, Cairns, a heritage-listed house in Queensland
- Bishop's House, Perth, a heritage-listed house in Western Australia
- Bishop's House, Toowoomba, a heritage-listed house in Queensland
- Bishop's Lodge, Townsville, a heritage-listed house in Queensland

== Denmark ==
- Bishop's House, Copenhagen, a listed building in Copenhagen
- Bishop's House, Kalundborg, a listed building in Kalundborg
- Bishop's House, Nykøbing Falster, a listed building in Nykøbing Falster
- Bishop's House, Viborg, a listed building in Viborg

== Hong Kong ==
- Bishop's House, Hong Kong, sometimes referred to as "Bishops House"

== United Kingdom ==
- Bishops' House, Sheffield, a home built c.1500, sometimes referred to as "Bishops House"
- Bishop's House, Birmingham
- Bishop's House, Iona
- Bishop's House, Wrexham

== United States ==
- Bishop's House (Portland, Oregon)

== See also ==
- Russian Bishop's House, historic house in Sitka, Alaska, sometimes referred to as "Bishops House", "Bishop's House", or "Bishops' House"
- Bishop House (disambiguation)
