= Eppelsheim =

- Municipality
- Coat of arms

- Location of Eppelsheim within Alzey-Worms district
- Interactive map of Eppelsheim
- Location within Germany Location within Rhineland-Palatinate
- Coordinates: 49°42′N 8°9′E
- Country: Germany
- State: Rhineland-Palatinate
- District: Alzey-Worms
- Municipal assoc.: Alzey-Land

Government
  - Mayor (2019–24): Ute Klenk-Kaufmann

Area
  - Total: 5.57 km^{2} (2.15 sq mi)
- Elevation: 179 m (587 ft)

Population (2025-12-31)
  - Total: 1,111
  - Density: 199/km^{2} (517/sq mi)
- Time zone: UTC+01:00 (CET)
  - Summer (DST): UTC+02:00 (CEST)
- Postal codes: 55234
- Dialling codes: 06735
- Vehicle registration: AZ
- Website: www.eppelsheim.de

Eppelsheim is an Ortsgemeinde – a municipality belonging to a Verbandsgemeinde, a kind of collective municipality – in the Alzey-Worms district in Rhineland-Palatinate, Germany.

== Geography ==
The municipality lies in Rhenish Hesse.

== Politics ==
=== Municipal council ===
The council is made up of 16 council members, who were elected at the municipal election held on 7 June 2009, and the honorary mayor as chairwoman.

The municipal election held on 7 June 2009 yielded the following results:

	SPD	FWG	Total
2009	6	10	16 seats
2004	5	11	16 seats

=== Coat of arms ===
The municipality’s arms are blazoned: Per pale Sable a lion rampant Or armed and langued Gules, and Or an apple twig fructed of two Vert.

== Culture and sightseeing ==
=== Deinotherium sands ===
The first discovery of a fossil femur of a great ape Paidopithex rhenanus (now considered to be an ape relative not an ape - possibly being a Pliopithecoid) was made near Eppelsheim in 1820. The finding was made in deposits of the prehistoric Rhine river and are about 10 million years old. These deposits are known as the Deinotherium Sands, because they often contain teeth and bones from the extinct proboscid Deinotherium.

In October 2017, scientists from the Natural History Museum at Mainz reported that two teeth about 5 to 8 million years old had been found in 2016, that resemble those of extinct human relatives Ardipithecus ramidus and Australopithecus afarensis. Early reactions to the "Eppelsheim teeth" ranged from interest to dismissal while the researchers indicated that they will continue their investigations and analysis.

=== Dinotherium Museum ===
The Dinotherium-Museum in Eppelsheim shows original finds of fossil mammals from local deposits. One attraction at the Dinotherium-Museum is the cast of a Deinotherium skull that was unearthed in 1835 near Eppelsheim. The Dinotherium-Museum was former mayor Heiner Roos's brainchild.

=== Buildings ===
==== Village dyke ====
The Dorfgraben, also called the Effenring, was a heart-shaped ditch that surrounded the mediaeval village, serving along with its banked walls as both a flood ditch and a village fortification. Its beginnings seem to have brought woes, though. History records only one dispute, in the late 14th century, between the von Dalberg family and the municipality. One family member claimed part of the dyke as his own. The ensuing negotiations ended with a compromise: one part each was allotted to the von Dalberg family and the municipality.

The four roads leading out of the village in the cardinal compass directions were particularly well secured with portcullises at the four gates (Pforten), (the Hangen-Weisheimer Pforte, the Flomborner Pforte, the Dintesheimer Pforte and the Alzeyer Pforte).

At the dawn of the 20th century, the dyke had become overgrown mainly with elms and since 11 March 1927 it has been a protected natural monument called the Effenkranz (“Elm Wreath”), or sometimes the Allee. Dutch elm disease, however, did not spare the Effenkranz, and between 1976 and 1981, all elms had to be felled, and they were replaced with 550 other trees.

==== Dalberg Tower ====
The Dalberger Turm was built about 1500 by the Chamberlains Dalberg from Worms, who nonetheless never lived in Eppelsheim, as a defensive tower and a dwelling for the Cathedral Foundation at Worms. It is nowadays under private ownership.

In old documents, the Dalberger Turm is described as the "Wasserhaus" (“Waterhouse”), because there was a moat around the tower, fed by the nearby village dyke. The building has walls wholly built out of quarrystones (limestone) and covers a ground area of some 10 m × 10 m. Besides the ground floor, there are also five upper floors. The ground floor’s walls are some 1.5 m thick.

Once, the only way in was through the first of the upper floors by way of a ladder or movable stairway. The tower was surrounded by a further wall with a parapet walk, and was part of the village’s fortifications. The roof, converted in 1602, was originally steeper; the less steep tent roof comes from a later time. Windows and arrowslits are framed with red sandstone. Heating facilities could not be ascertained, and therefore the tower’s use as a dwelling, at least in times of danger, must be assumed (it was later used as a warehouse and a fruit store).

The Dalberger Turm and the townscape with the village walls have since 30 September 1988 been under the protection of the Hague Conventions.

== Famous people ==
- Henry Greenebaum (1833–1914), Jewish-American banker
- Emil Knodt (1852-1924), Evangelical theologian and animal welfare proponent.
