= Otto Kleemann =

Otto Karl Kleemann (March 13, 1855 – February 28, 1936), frequently alternatively spelled Otto Kleeman, was an American architect in Portland, Oregon. His work included the design for Portland's Hotel Arminius and St. Patrick's Roman Catholic Church and Rectory.

== Early years ==
Kleemann was born in Ostrowo, Province of Posen, Prussia, on March 13, 1855. He attended a technical school at Holzminden and college in Ostrowo, completing his schooling at sixteen. He moved to the U.S. in September 1871, making his way to San Francisco by way of the Isthmus of Panama. He was "unacquainted with the language and customs of the American people and at first it was difficult to get steady work, but later was employed by several architects and spent nine years in California."

== Career ==
He moved to Portland in September 1880 and became a draftsman at Clark & Upton for several months before joining Justus F. Krumbein, where he worked for another several months. He worked with the Oregon Railway and Navigation Company for thirteen months on "their shops at Albina, and later he embarked in business on his own account" in 1882. He designed the original monastery in Mt. Angel, Oregon, built many convents, and "has done much important work for the different Catholic organizations", although not Catholic himself.

For a period of 17 years, Otto Kleemann was grand adjutant of the Indian War Veterans of the North Pacific Coast, a regent of Multnomah Council No. 1481 Royal Arcanum. He was also president of the Consolidation of German Speaking Societies of Oregon, a life member of the German Aid Society, and a Freemason.

A number of his works are listed on the National Register of Historic Places (NRHP).

== Family ==
He married Anna Gehlich in Oakland, California, on April 19, 1877, and the couple had three children: Hugo, William, and Clara. Anna Kleemann died in 1915. Otto Kleemann remarried in June 1916, to Nellie A. Taylor, in The Dalles, Oregon.

== Death ==
After moving to Portland in late 1880, Kleemann continued to reside there until his death, in 1936. He was buried at River View Cemetery.

== Works ==
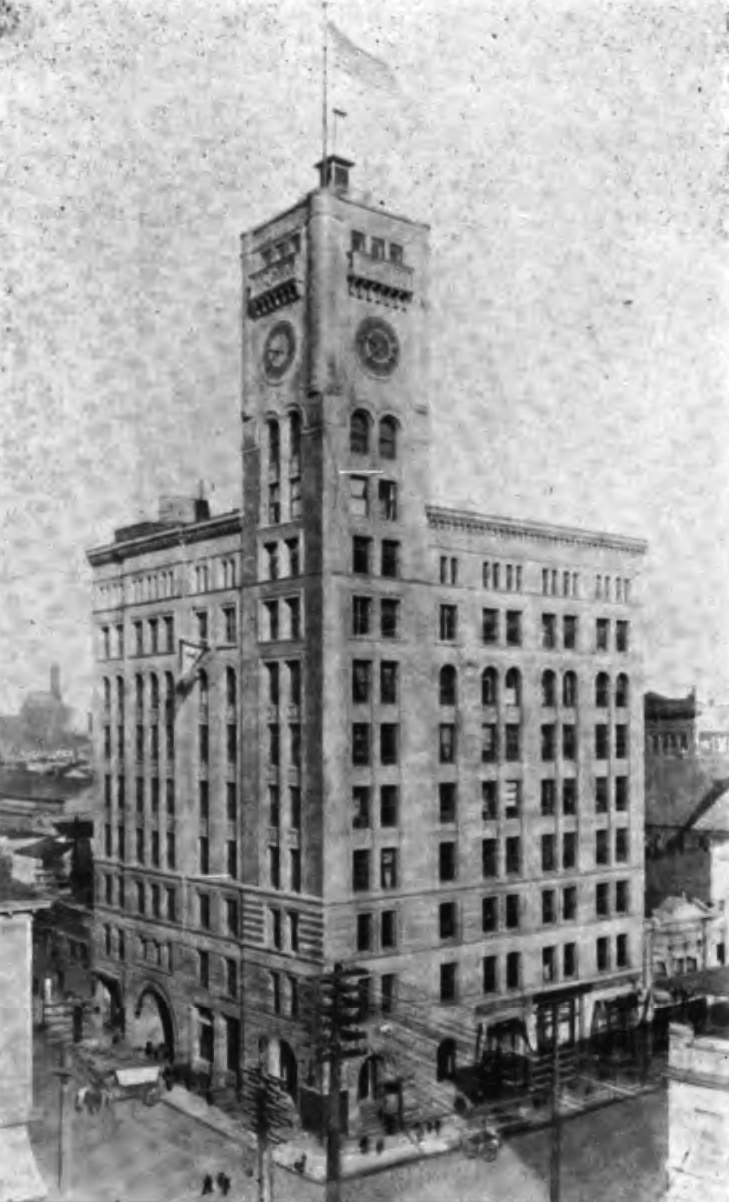
Kleemann was a consulting architect on The Oregonian Building.

- Francis R. Chown House (1882), a High Victorian style building at 2030 SW Main Street, NRHP-listed
- Rosamond Coursen and Walter R. Reed House (1887), a Queen Anne style architecture in the United States style building at 2036-2038 SW Main Street in Portland., NRHP-listed
- St. Patrick's Roman Catholic Church and Rectory (1889), 1635 NW 19th Avenue
- St. Mary's Academy (1890)
- St. Patrick's Roman Catholic Church and Rectory (1891), 1635 NW 19th Ave., Portland, NRHP-listed
- The Oregonian Building (1892), SW 6th and Alder, demolished 1950; consulting architect only (to Reid & Reid)
- Hotel Arminius (1904) at 1022-1038 SW Morrison Street, Portland, NRHP-listed
- Reed-Wells House (1905) at 2168 NE Multnomah Street, Portland, NRHP-listed
- St. Peter's Roman Catholic Church (1898), The Dalles
- Queen of Angels Priory, 840 S. Main St., Mt. Angel (Otto Kleemann et al.), NRHP-listed
