= Leslie T. Applegate House =

- U.S. National Register of Historic Places
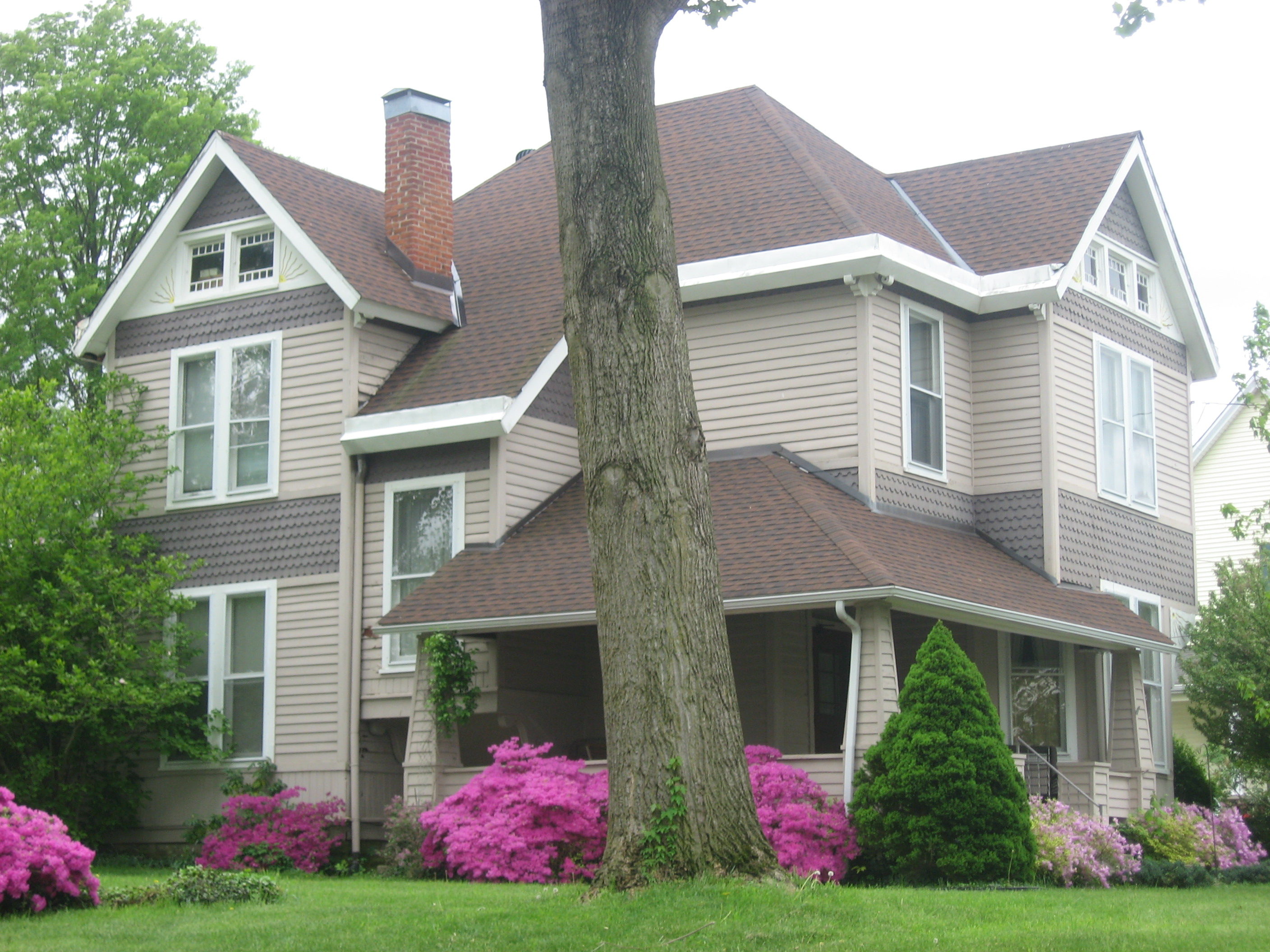

- Location within Kentucky Location within the United States
- Location: 410 Maple St., Falmouth, Kentucky
- Coordinates: 38°40′32″N 84°20′00″W
- Area: less than one acre
- Built: 1888
- Architectural style: Shingle Style
- MPS: Falmouth MRA
- NRHP reference No.: 83002845
- Added to NRHP: March 4, 1983

The Leslie T. Applegate House, at 410 Maple St. in Falmouth, Kentucky, United States, was built in 1888. It was listed on the National Register of Historic Places in 1983.

It is a Shingle Style house which was built for locally prominent lawyer Leslie T. Applegate. Its exterior has been restored to its original appearance. It was deemed to be the "best example of late 19th century residence on Maple Street (site of early Falmouth 'suburb') with integrity intact".
