= Elzey Hughes House =

- U.S. National Register of Historic Places
- Elzey Hughes House in August 1982

- Location within Kentucky Location within the United States
- Location: 308 2nd St., Falmouth, Kentucky
- Coordinates: 38.67915°N 84.33242°W
- Area: less than one acre
- MPS: Falmouth MRA
- NRHP reference No.: 83002851
- Added to NRHP: March 4, 1983

The Elzey Hughes House was a building located at 308 Second Street in Falmouth, Kentucky. It was listed on the National Register of Historic Places in 1983. It was built for Elzey Hughes, a son of Charity Southgate and was significant as one of the few remaining buildings of Falmouth's segregated black district, Happy Hollow.

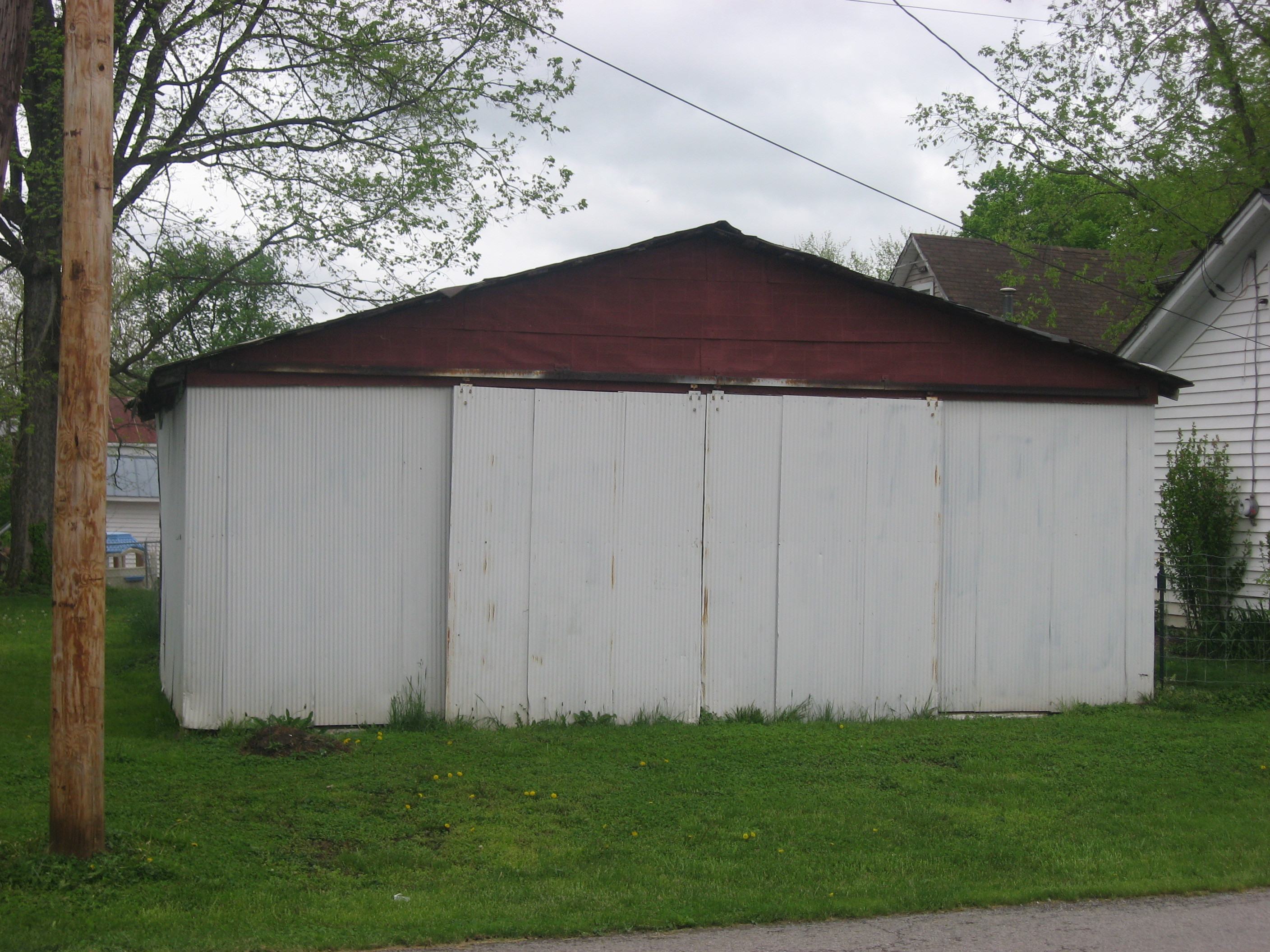
Site of the house

== See also ==
- Charity's House: Also in Happy Hallow
- National Register of Historic Places listings in Pendleton County, Kentucky
