= St. Patrick Catholic Church (Portland, Oregon) =

Historic church in Portland, Oregon, United States

- St. Patrick's Roman Catholic Church and Rectory
- U.S. National Register of Historic Places
- Portland Historic Landmark
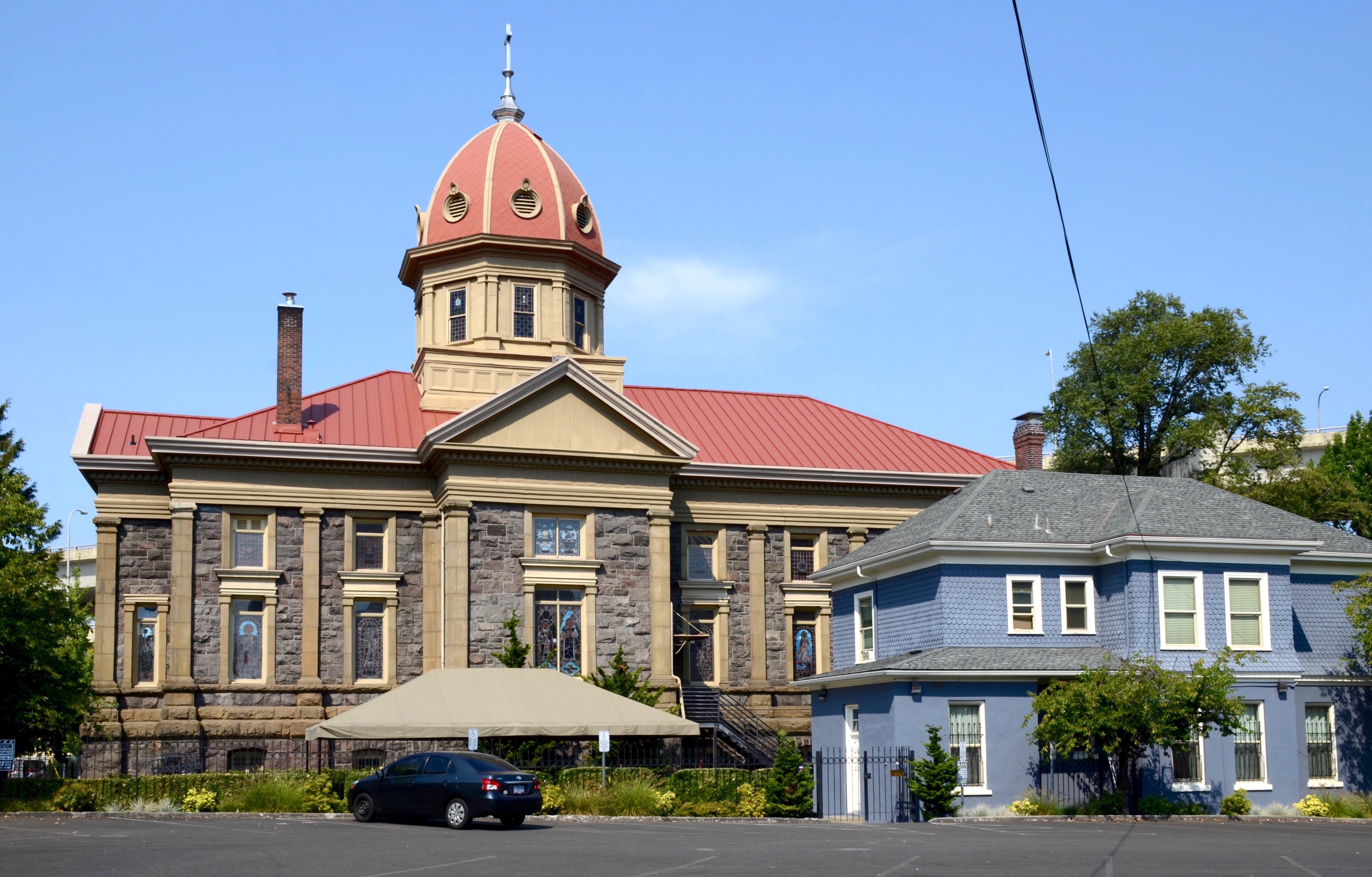
- The church and rectory in 2017
- Location: 1635 NW 19th Avenue; Portland, Oregon
- Coordinates: 45°32′05″N 122°41′28″W
- Built: 1891
- Architect: Otto Kleemann
- Architectural style: Beaux-Arts
- NRHP reference No.: 74001713
- Added to NRHP: May 1, 1974

St. Patrick Catholic Church is a parish of the Archdiocese of Portland, Oregon in the Northwest District of Portland, Oregon, United States. The historic church building is the oldest still used as such in Portland. In 1974, it was listed on the National Register of Historic Places as St. Patrick's Roman Catholic Church and Rectory.

== Building ==
The church was originally designed by Otto Kleemann in the Second Renaissance Revival style; it is the only remaining Kleemann church in Portland. The original plans called for a brick structure, but with the foundation already laid, the material was changed to Clackamas County basalt.

The church is cruciform, with an Italianate hipped dome and spire rising 35 feet above the ridge of the roof. The bays are separated by Ionic pilasters extending from the basement to the entablature. The stained glass windows represent some of the earliest work of the Povey Brothers Studio.

The interior of the church was not completed until 1914, when the plaster and lath were decorated with murals in honor of the church's silver jubilee. Swiss artist Phillip Staehli was commissioned to reproduce pictures from Trinity College, Dublin; he painted a fresco of the Transfiguration of Jesus above the tabernacle and altar, flanked by lifesize paintings of Saint Patrick and Saint Bridget. Along the nave are frescoes of the principal saints of Ireland, most of which survive: Columba, Kieran, Fridolin, Canice, Colman, Gall, Virgilius, Columbkille, Brendan, Jarith, Lawrence O'Toole, Malachy, and Ailbe.

== History ==
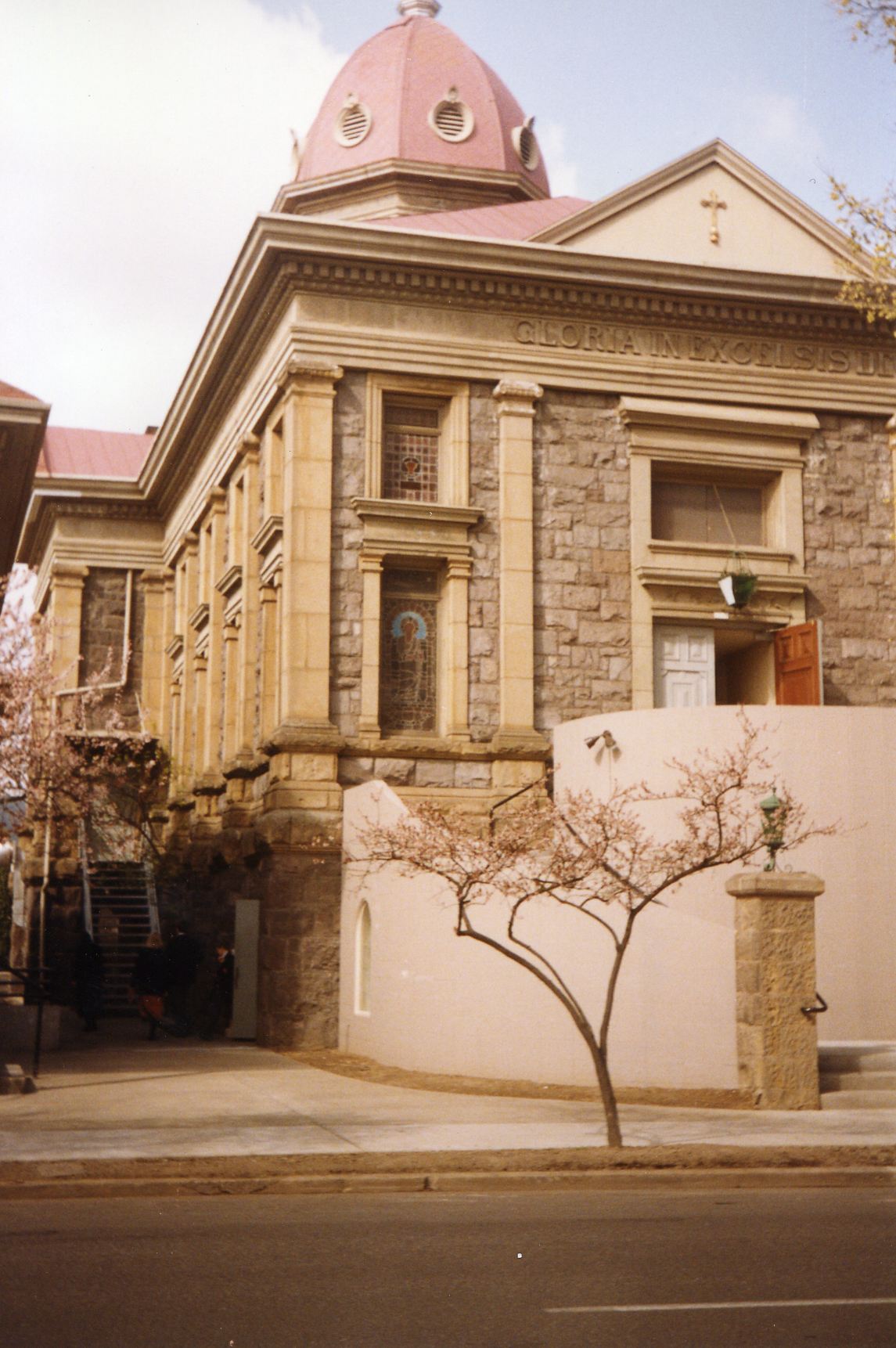
Front of church, 1991

The community was established in 1885 by Archbishop William Hickley Gross to serve the mostly Irish Catholic lumber and dockworkers in the area, located in the industrial areas of Slabtown and what is now called the Pearl District. A church and school, dedicated to the Sacred Heart, were opened as a mission of the cathedral.

The cornerstone for the new church was laid on Saint Patrick's Day 1889; still unfinished, it was dedicated two years later. St. Patrick's built a Catholic school in 1918, operated by the Sisters of Mercy and after 1925, by the School Sisters of St. Francis. In addition to the Irish community, the parish registry swelled with new immigrants from Croatia, Slovakia, and Slovenia.

As the neighborhood became more industrialized, it depopulated, and attendance fell. The school closed in 1957. The construction of the Fremont Bridge and Interstate 405 further disrupted the neighborhood, and by 1972, the parish, with only 60 registered families, had reverted to a mission church under the supervision of St. Birgitta in Linnton.

In 1980, Bishop Paul E. Waldschmidt selected the church to serve the Hispanic population of Portland. In June 1985, St. Patrick's also became home to the Latin choir Cantores in Ecclesia. These set the stage for the revival of the parish, which celebrated its centennial in 1989.

== In popular culture ==
A wedding scene in the 2004 film What the Bleep Do We Know was filmed at St. Patrick's.

== See also ==
- Culture of Portland, Oregon
- National Register of Historic Places listings in Northwest Portland, Oregon
- Religion in Portland, Oregon
