= Dolph Aluck Smokehouse =

- U.S. National Register of Historic Places
- Location within Kentucky Location within the United States
- Location: Milford Rd., in Pendleton County, Kentucky near Falmouth
- Coordinates: 38°35′31″N 84°12′19″W
- Area: 44 acres (18 ha)
- Architectural style: Greek Revival, Greek Vernacular
- MPS: Early Stone Buildings of Kentucky Outer Bluegrass and Pennyrile TR
- NRHP reference No.: 87000162
- Added to NRHP: January 8, 1987

The Dolph Aluck Smokehouse is a stone smokehouse located on the north side of Milford Rd., in Pendleton County, Kentucky near Falmouth. It faces the confluence of the North Fork Licking River and the Licking River. It was listed on the National Register of Historic Places in 1987.

It was built in the mid-1800s and was deemed significant as a "Typical early Kentucky smokehouse in good condition." It is believed to have been built by Dolph Aluck, owner of brick Greek Revival house at the site.
