= Sheehan House =

- U.S. National Register of Historic Places
- Location within Kentucky Location within the United States
- Location: 206 N. Maple St., Falmouth, Kentucky
- Coordinates: 38°40′45″N 84°19′52″W
- Area: less than one acre
- Built: c.1870
- MPS: Falmouth MRA
- NRHP reference No.: 83002859
- Added to NRHP: March 4, 1983

The Sheehan House, at 206 N. Maple St. in Falmouth, Kentucky, was listed on the National Register of Historic Places in 1983.

Built around 1870 on the Bullock lot at Maple & Shelby, the house was moved to the 206 N. Maple St. site in 1893 and placed on a stone foundation. It had a five-bay facade with a full-length front porch with turned posts and machine cut trim. Its south facade had a bay with bracketed cornice.

Sheehan bought the house from Bullock heirs in 1919 and was owner of a feed and grain business at the foot of Maple Street.

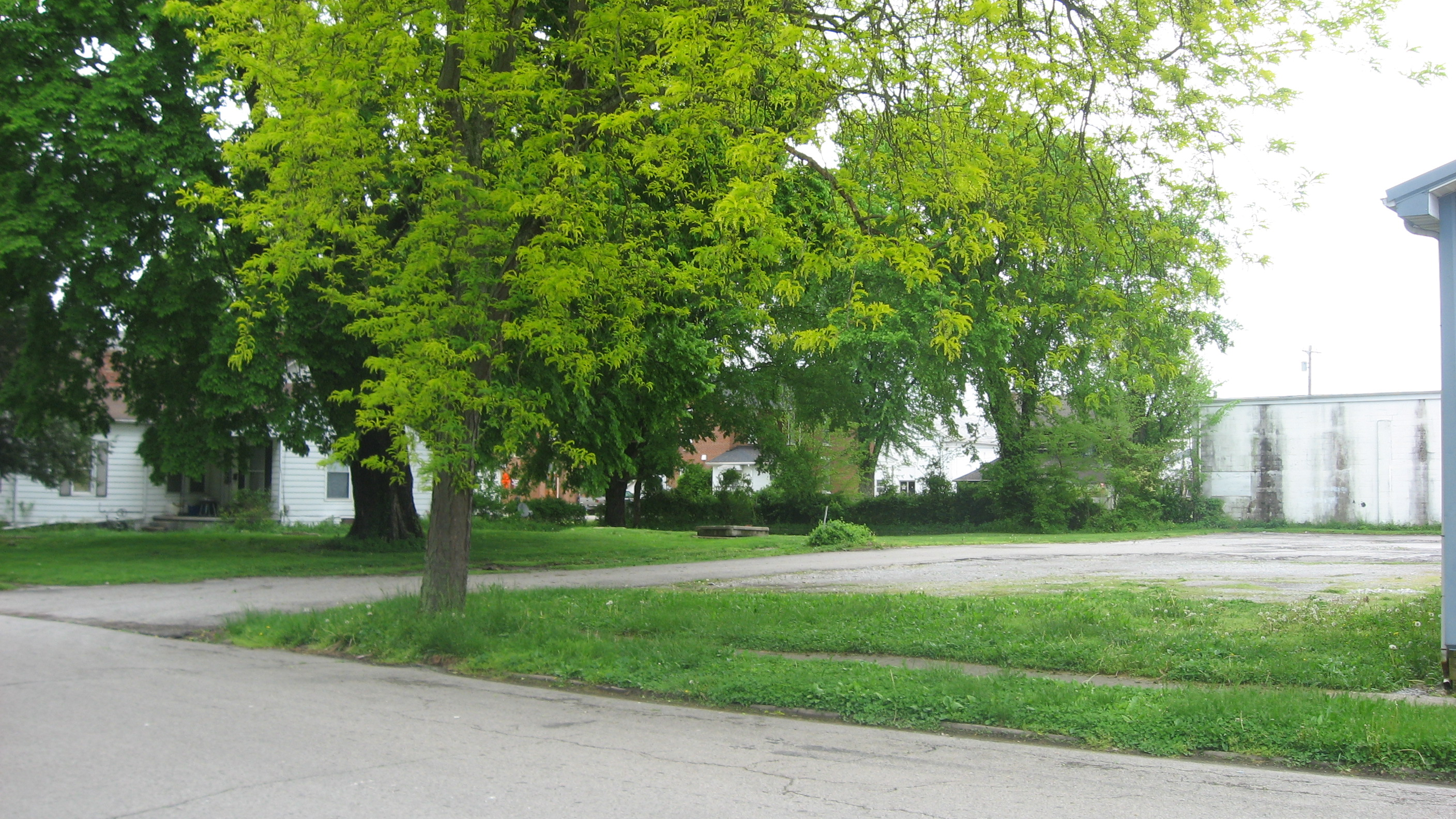
Site of the house photographed in 2013

The house appears no longer at the location.
