= Reid House =

Reid House may refer to:

in the United States

- Nash-Reid-Hill House, Jonesboro, Arkansas, listed on the National Register of Historic Places (NRHP)
- Reid House (Little Rock, Arkansas), NRHP-listed
- Leonard Reid House, Sarasota, Florida, NRHP-listed
- Reid-Woods House, Sarasota, Florida, NRHP-listed
- Reid House (Atlanta, Georgia), also known as Garrison Apartments, NRHP-listed
- Reid-Jones-Carpenter House, Augusta, Georgia, NRHP-listed
- Reid-Glanton House, La Grange, Georgia, listed on the NRHP in Georgia
- Reid House (Chicago, Illinois), NRHP-listed
- Dr. William E. Reid House, Leesville, Louisiana, listed on the NRHP in Louisiana
- Reid House (Iuka, Mississippi), listed on the NRHP in Mississippi
- Stone-Reid House, Iuka, Mississippi, listed on the NRHP in Mississippi
- Reid-Kent House, Kalispell, Montana, listed on the NRHP in Montana
- Reid House (Missoula, Montana), listed on the NRHP in Montana
- Reid House (Pittsboro, North Carolina), NRHP-listed
- Gov. David S. Reid House, Reidsville, North Carolina, NRHP-listed
- Whitelaw Reid House, Cedarville, Ohio, NRHP-listed
- Hinkle-Reid House, Mill City, Oregon, listed on the NRHP in Marion County, Oregon
- Reid-White-Philbin House, Lexington, Virginia, NRHP-listed

== See also ==
- Reid Farm, Jackson Hill, North Carolina, NRHP-listed
- Reed House (disambiguation)
- Read House (disambiguation)
