= Charity's House =

Historic house in Kentucky, United States

- U.S. National Register of Historic Places
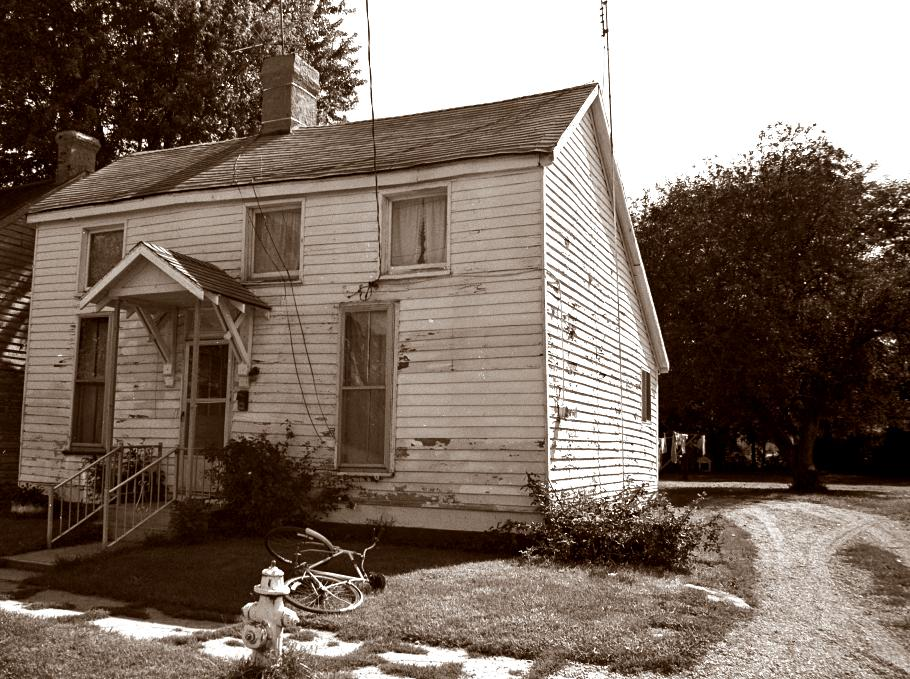

- Location within Kentucky Location within the United States
- Location: 108 Montjoy St. Falmouth, Kentucky
- Coordinates: 38°40′46″N 84°19′56″W
- Area: less than one acre
- Built: c. 1850
- Architectural style: Vernacular
- MPS: Falmouth MRA
- NRHP reference No.: 83002848
- Added to NRHP: March 4, 1983

Charity's House, at 108 Montjoy St. in Falmouth, Kentucky, was listed on the National Register of Historic Places in 1983.

Deemed notable in black history, it was home to Charity Southgate, from whom most of black population in Falmouth descended. She bought the lot in 1845 after gaining her freedom from slavery, and built this house soon after. It was in the Happy Hollow neighborhood. She built several other houses on the block for her children and grandchildren.

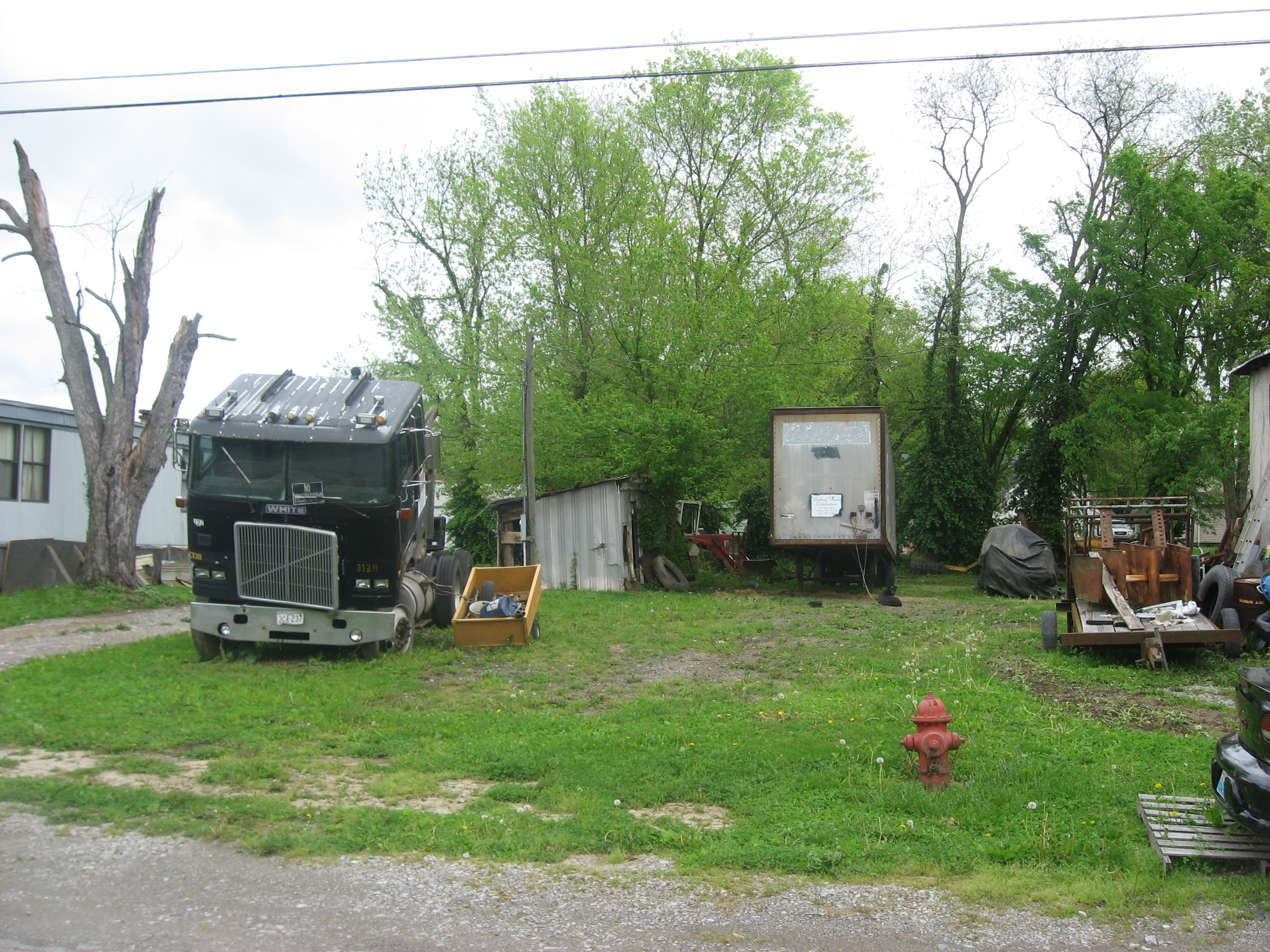
Site of house, presumably demolished

The house no longer is on the site.

== See also ==
- Elzey Hughes House: Also in Happy Hallow
- National Register of Historic Places listings in Pendleton County, Kentucky
