= Little Heaven, Delaware =

Unincorporated community in Delaware, United States

- Unincorporated community
- Location within the state of Delaware Little Heaven, Delaware (the United States)
- Coordinates: 39°02′30″N 75°27′24″W
- Country: United States
- State: Delaware
- County: Kent
- Elevation: 26 ft (7.9 m)
- Time zone: UTC-5 (Eastern (EST))
  - Summer (DST): UTC-4 (EDT)
- Area code: 302
- GNIS feature ID: 214234

Little Heaven is an unincorporated community in Kent County, Delaware, United States. Its elevation is 26 ft (7.9 m) and its position 39°02′30″N 75°27′24″W. It is north of Frederica at the interchange between Delaware Route 1 and Bowers Beach Road/Clapham Road.

It originated in a group of cabins built by local farmer Jahu Reed in the 1870s for the Irish workers he employed in his orchards. The Jehu Reed House was listed on the National Register of Historic Places in 1973.

== Notable person ==
- Traves Brownlee, Vice presidential candidate of the American Party in the 1984 United States presidential election
