= Arminius Hotel =

Historic building in Portland, Oregon, U.S.

- U.S. National Register of Historic Places
- Portland Historic Landmark
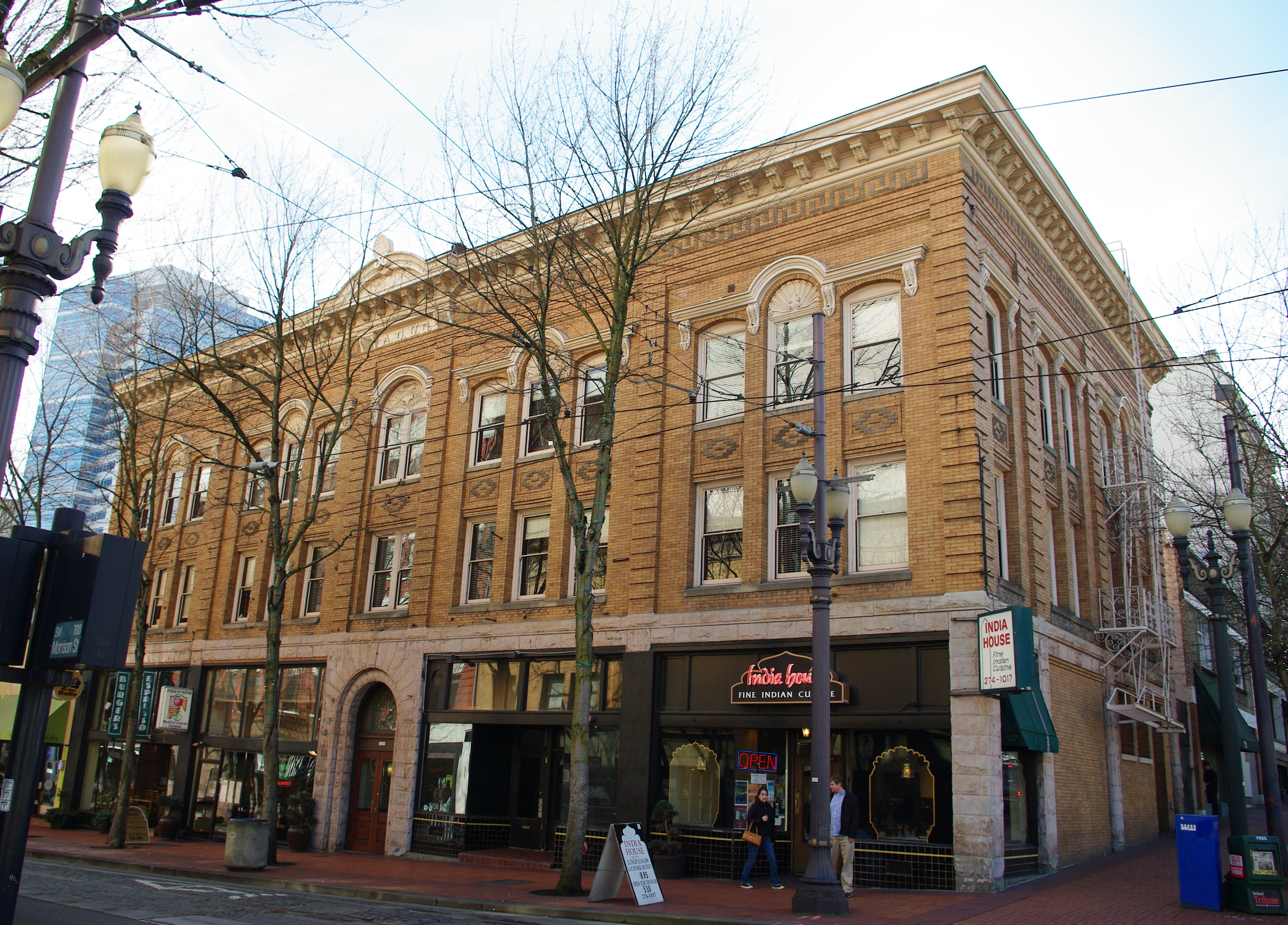
- The Arminius Hotel in 2011.

- Location within Portland, Oregon
- Location: 1022–1038 SW Morrison Street; Portland, Oregon
- Coordinates: 45°31′12″N 122°40′58″W
- Area: less than one acre
- Built: 1904
- Architect: Otto Kleeman
- Architectural style: 20th Century Classical
- NRHP reference No.: 88001038
- Added to NRHP: July 14, 1988

The Arminius Hotel is a historic hotel in Portland, Oregon, United States. It was built in 1904 by Otto Kleeman, and is on the National Register of Historic Places. The inscription A.D.U.G. stands for the Allgemeine Deutsche Unterstützungsgesellschaft (General German Aid Society) that constructed the building.
