= Read School =

Read School may refer to:

- Read School, Drax, a British public school
- Read School (Coventry, Rhode Island), a historic schoolhouse, listed on the National Register of Historic Places (NRHP)
- Read School (Oshkosh, Wisconsin), listed on the NRHP in Winnebago County, Wisconsin
- Thomas Buchanan Read School, Philadelphia, Pennsylvania, listed on the NRHP in Southwest Philadelphia
- Reed School, Maine

== See also ==
- Read House (disambiguation)
