= Rosamond Coursen and Walter R. Reed House =

Historic building in Portland, Oregon, U.S.

- U.S. National Register of Historic Places
- U.S. Historic district – Contributing property
- Portland Historic Landmark
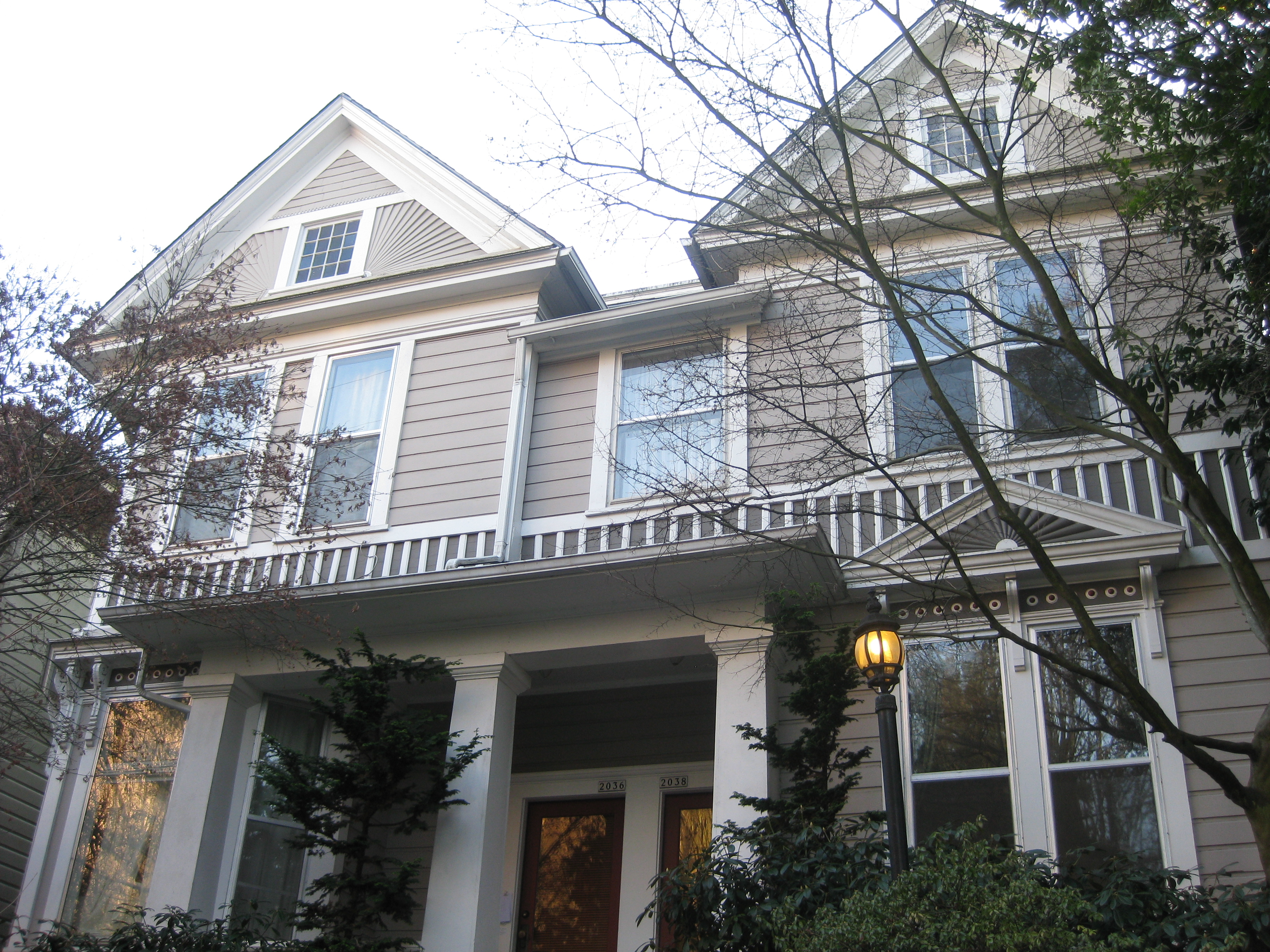
- The house's exterior in 2010

- Location within Portland, Oregon Location within Oregon Location within the United States
- Location: 2036–2038 SW Main Street; Portland, Oregon
- Coordinates: 45°31′12″N 122°41′41″W
- Architect: Otto K. Kleeman
- Architectural style: Queen Anne
- Part of: King's Hill Historic District (ID91000039)
- NRHP reference No.: 90000288
- Added to NRHP: February 23, 1990

The Rosamond Coursen and Walter R. Reed House is a house located in southwest Portland, Oregon listed on the National Register of Historic Places.

It has also been known as the Rosa Reed House.

== See also ==
- National Register of Historic Places listings in Southwest Portland, Oregon
