= Reed–Wells House =

Historic building in Portland, Oregon, U.S.

- U.S. National Register of Historic Places
- Portland Historic Landmark
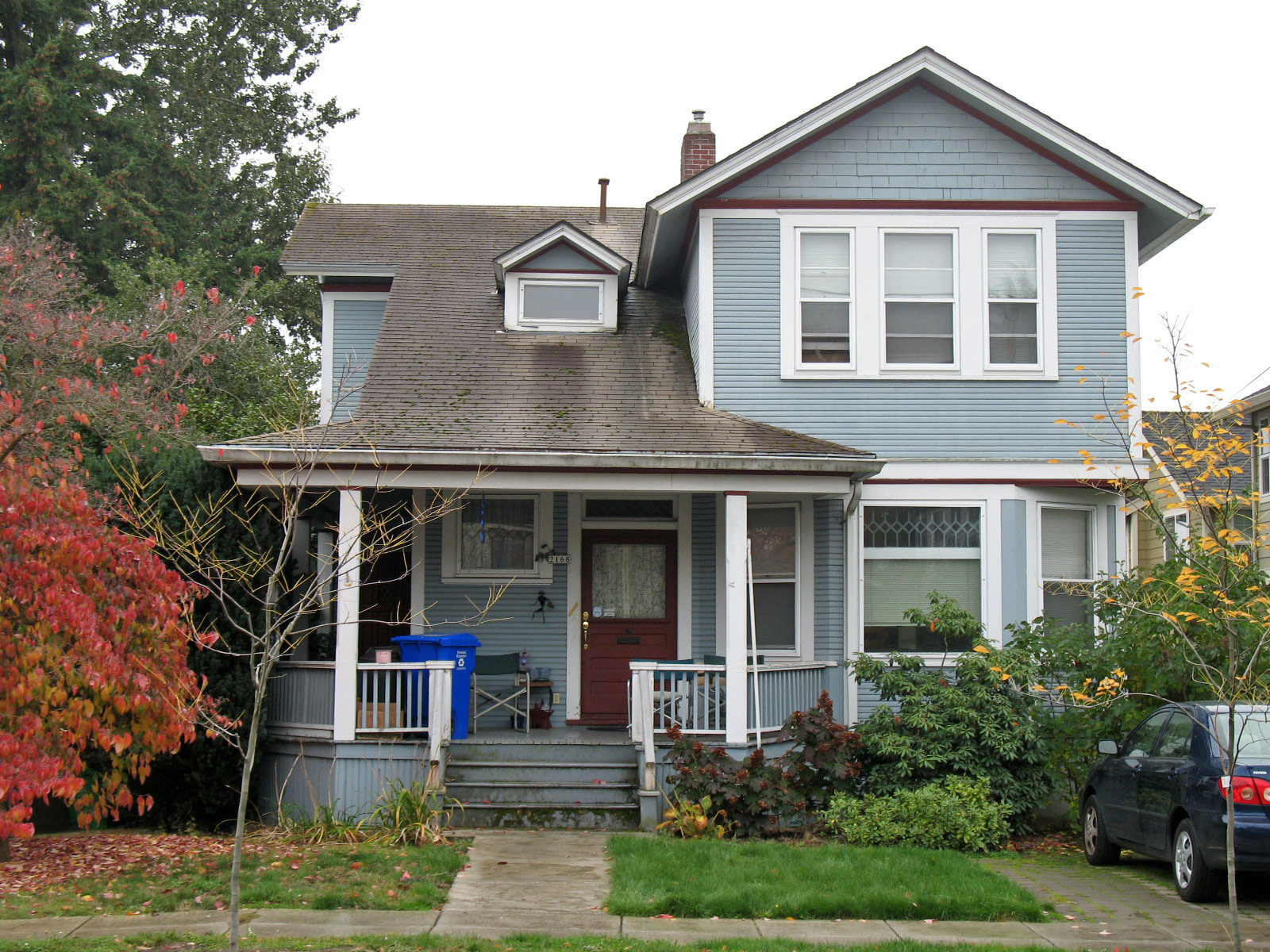
- The house in 2009

- Location within the United States Location within Oregon Location within Portland, Oregon
- Location: 2163 NE Multnomah Street; Portland, Oregon
- Coordinates: 45°31′53″N 122°38′36″W
- Built: 1905
- Architect: Otto K. Kleemann
- Architectural style: vernacular Queen Anne
- NRHP reference No.: 04000878
- Added to NRHP: August 20, 2004

The Reed–Wells House is a historic building in Portland, Oregon, United States. Built in 1905, it is significant as a well-preserved example of the development of the Sullivan's Gulch neighborhood during Portland's building boom of the early parts of the 20th century. Developers modeled Sullivan's Gulch on the success of nearby Irvington, including the use of restrictive deed covenants, so that it unfolded as a neighborhood of single-family homes affordable for the expanding middle class. Beginning in the 1960s, increased commercial and multi-family construction altered this neighborhood character, decreasing the dominance of houses such as the Reed–Wells House. Secondarily, the house is a rare residential product of noted architect Otto Kleemann.

The house was entered on the National Register of Historic Places in 2004.

== See also ==
- National Register of Historic Places listings in Northeast Portland, Oregon
