= G.W. Reed Travellers Home =

Historic house in Maine, United States

- G. W. Reed Travellers Home
- U.S. National Register of Historic Places
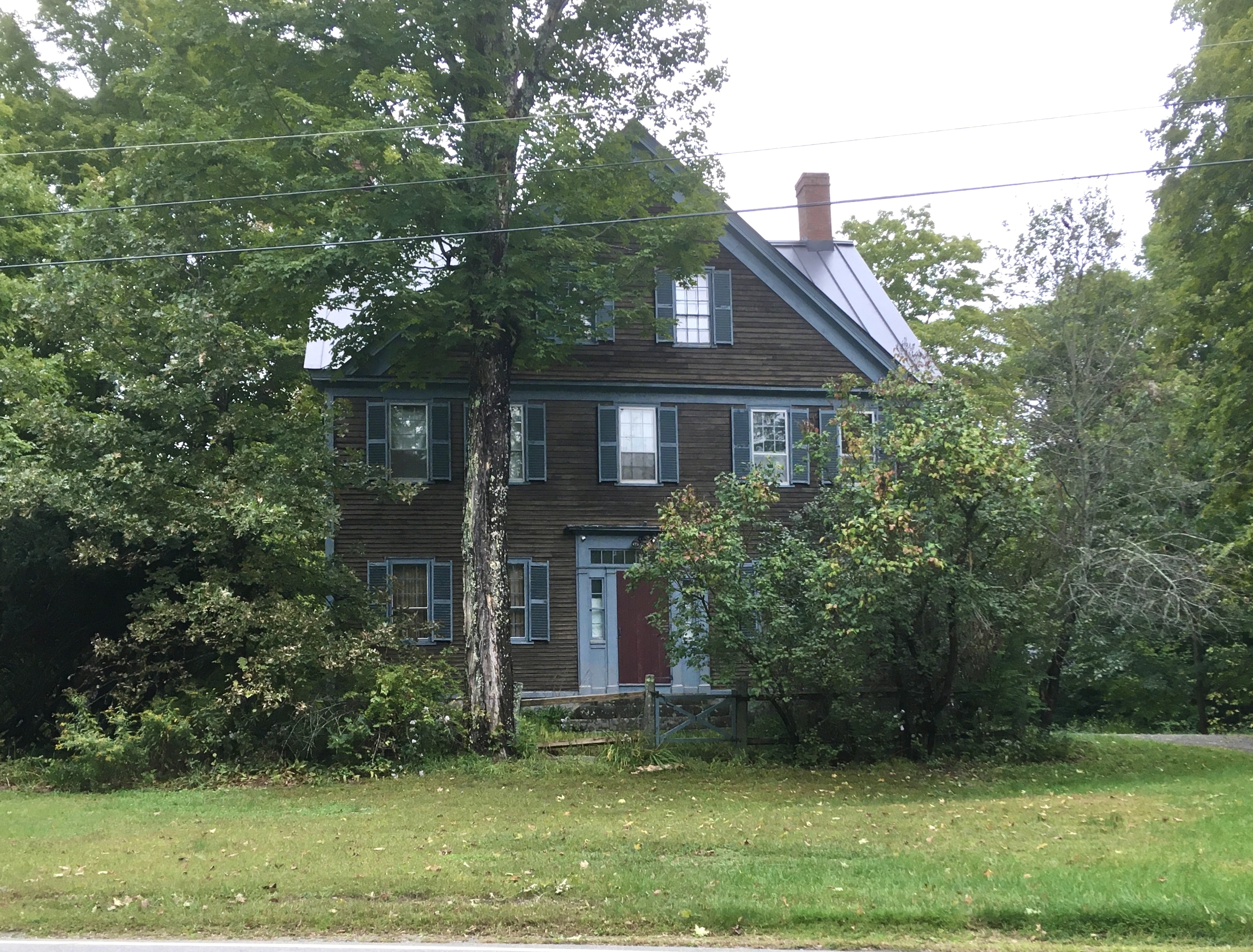
- The G.W. Reed Travelers Home, also known as the David Reed House.
- Location: Benton, Maine
- Area: 0.5 acres (0.20 ha)
- Built: 1790
- Built by: Reed, David
- Architectural style: Federal
- NRHP reference No.: 82000757
- Added to NRHP: February 11, 1982

The G.W. Reed Travellers Home is a historic house and former inn in the Benton Falls village of Benton, Maine. It is a two-story wood-frame building, constructed about 1813, with an older house attached as an ell to the rear. It was built by David Reed, and served as a stop for travellers on the road running on the south side of the Sebasticook River, and as a meeting point for local militia. It was listed on the National Register of Historic Places in 1982.

== See also ==
- National Register of Historic Places listings in Kennebec County, Maine
