= Frank Reed Three-Decker =

- U.S. National Register of Historic Places
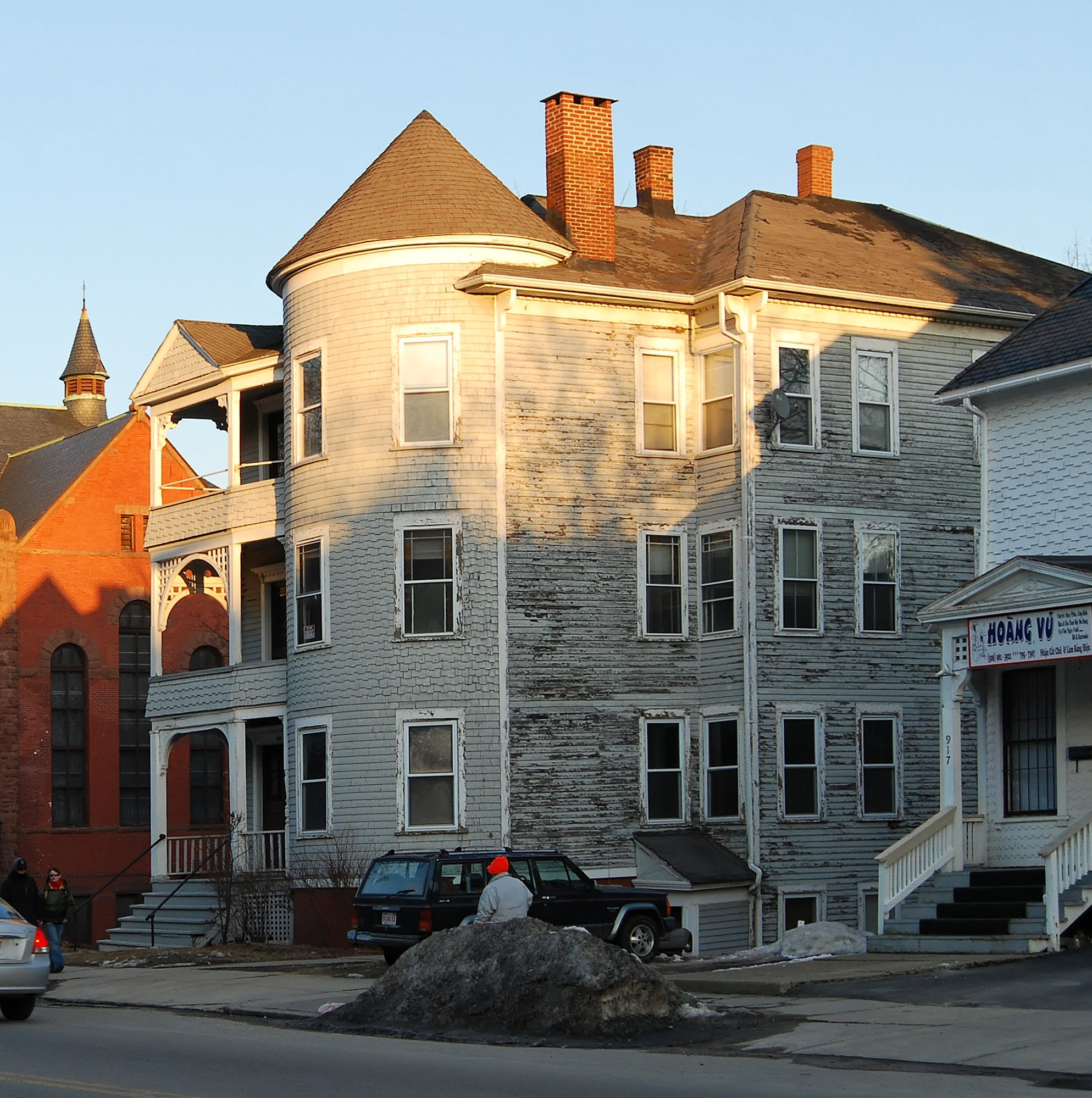

- Location within Massachusetts Location within the United States
- Location: 913–915 Main St., Worcester, Massachusetts
- Coordinates: 42°15′6″N 71°49′10″W
- Built: 1888
- Architectural style: Queen Anne, Shingle Style
- MPS: Worcester Three-Deckers TR
- NRHP reference No.: 89002422
- Added to NRHP: February 9, 1990

The Frank Reed Three-Decker is a historic triple decker house in Worcester, Massachusetts. It was built c. 1888 for Frank Reed, an electrician and machinist who eventually opened his own business. The house is a particularly elegant example of a Queen Anne triple decker. Its porch has square cut chamfered posts, is decorated with lattice work, and has a projecting gabled top. The right side bay is round with a conical roof section, and is clad in shingles cut in a wavy pattern. The deep cornice is decorated with brackets near the corners.

The house was listed on the National Register of Historic Places in 1990.

== See also ==
- Pilgrim Congregational Church (Worcester, Massachusetts), next door
- National Register of Historic Places listings in southwestern Worcester, Massachusetts
- National Register of Historic Places listings in Worcester County, Massachusetts
