= Cheney Read House =

Historic house in Massachusetts, United States

- U.S. National Register of Historic Places
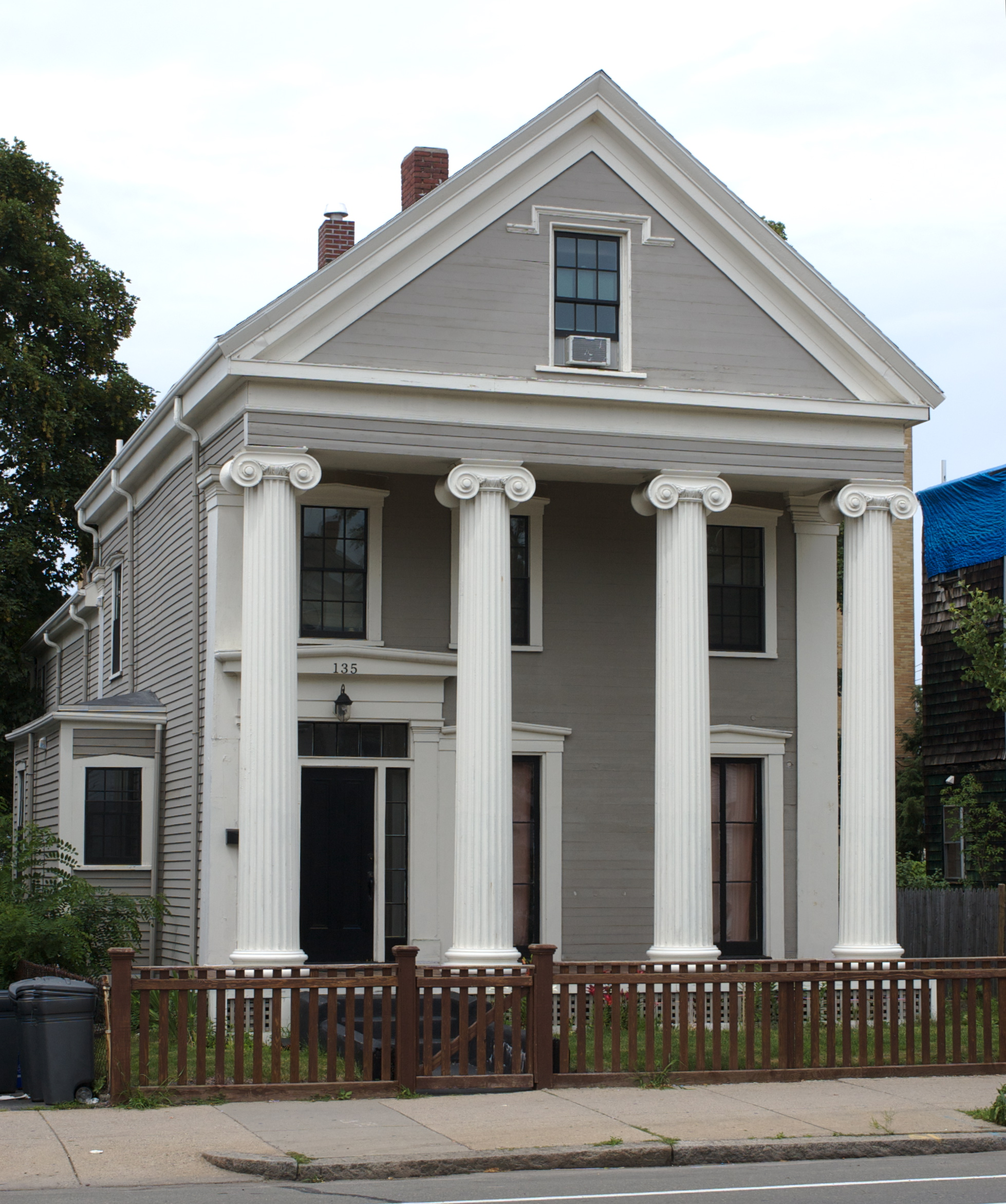

- Location within Massachusetts Location within the United States
- Location: Cambridge, Massachusetts
- Coordinates: 42°21′54.5″N 71°06′30.7″W
- Built: 1846
- Architect: Hyde, William
- Architectural style: Greek Revival
- MPS: Cambridge MRA
- NRHP reference No.: 82001971
- Added to NRHP: April 13, 1982

The Cheney Read House is an historic house at 135 Western Avenue in Cambridge, Massachusetts, USA. The 2 1/2-story wood-frame house was built in 1846 by William Hyde, and is the only house in Cambridge's Cambridgeport neighborhood with a two-story Greek portico. It has four full-height Doric columns, with a gable end that is steeper than the usual Greek Revival style. It has a side-entry plan, with the entrance flanked by pilasters and topped by a pedimented lintel.

The house was listed on the National Register of Historic Places in 1982.

== See also ==
- National Register of Historic Places listings in Cambridge, Massachusetts
