= Timothy Reed House =

Historic house in Massachusetts, United States

- U.S. National Register of Historic Places
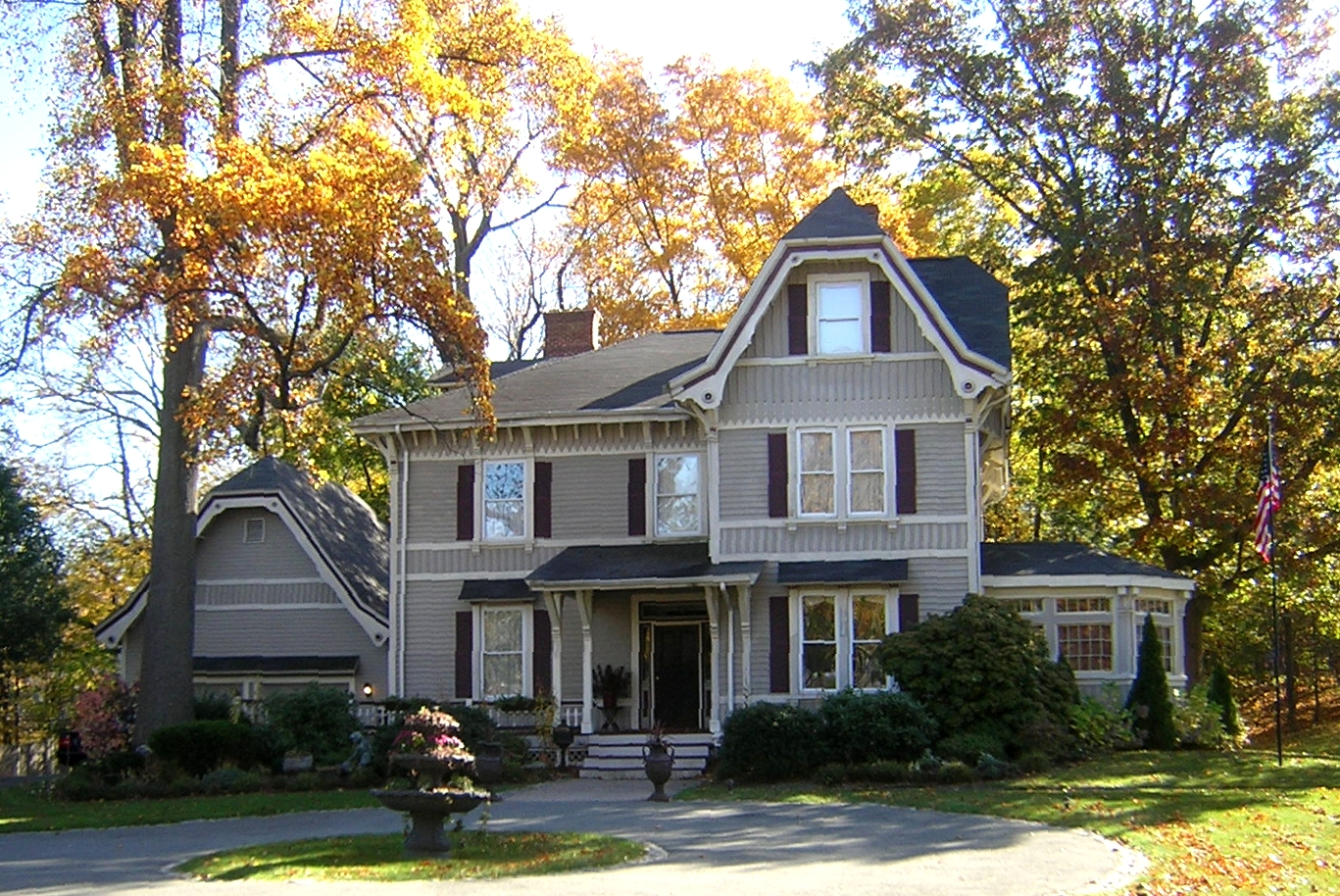

- Location within Massachusetts Location within the United States
- Location: 284 Adams St., Quincy, Massachusetts
- Coordinates: 42°15′12″N 71°0′58″W
- Area: 1.5 acres (0.61 ha)
- Built: 1875
- Architectural style: Stick/Eastlake, Queen Anne
- MPS: Quincy MRA
- NRHP reference No.: 89001311
- Added to NRHP: September 20, 1989

The Timothy Reed House is a historic house at 284 Adams Street in Quincy, Massachusetts. This two-story wood-frame house was built in the 1870s by Timothy Reed, a Boston-based leather merchant. It is the city's finest Stick style house, with bargeboard gable decoration, and alternating sections of horizontal and vertical siding, set off by trim bands. Its gable ends are truncated, the eaves are lined with brackets, and the front porch has a low turned balustrade and posts with large brackets.

The house was listed on the National Register of Historic Places in 1989.

== See also ==
- National Register of Historic Places listings in Quincy, Massachusetts
