= German Aid Society =

German Aid Society was the name of various support groups in the United States for immigrants from Europe and people with German ancestry. They were in Sandusky, Ohio, Boston, Massachusetts and Portland, Oregon, the latter including Prussian-born architect Otto Kleemann.

== History ==
The first German Aid Society was founded in 1764 to aid German immigrants. The one in Chicago was founded in 1854. Portland started one in 1871. Boston's was active by 1885.

The organizations were part of congressional hearings in the late 1800s.
