= Jehu Reed House =

Former historic house in Delaware, US

- U.S. National Register of Historic Places
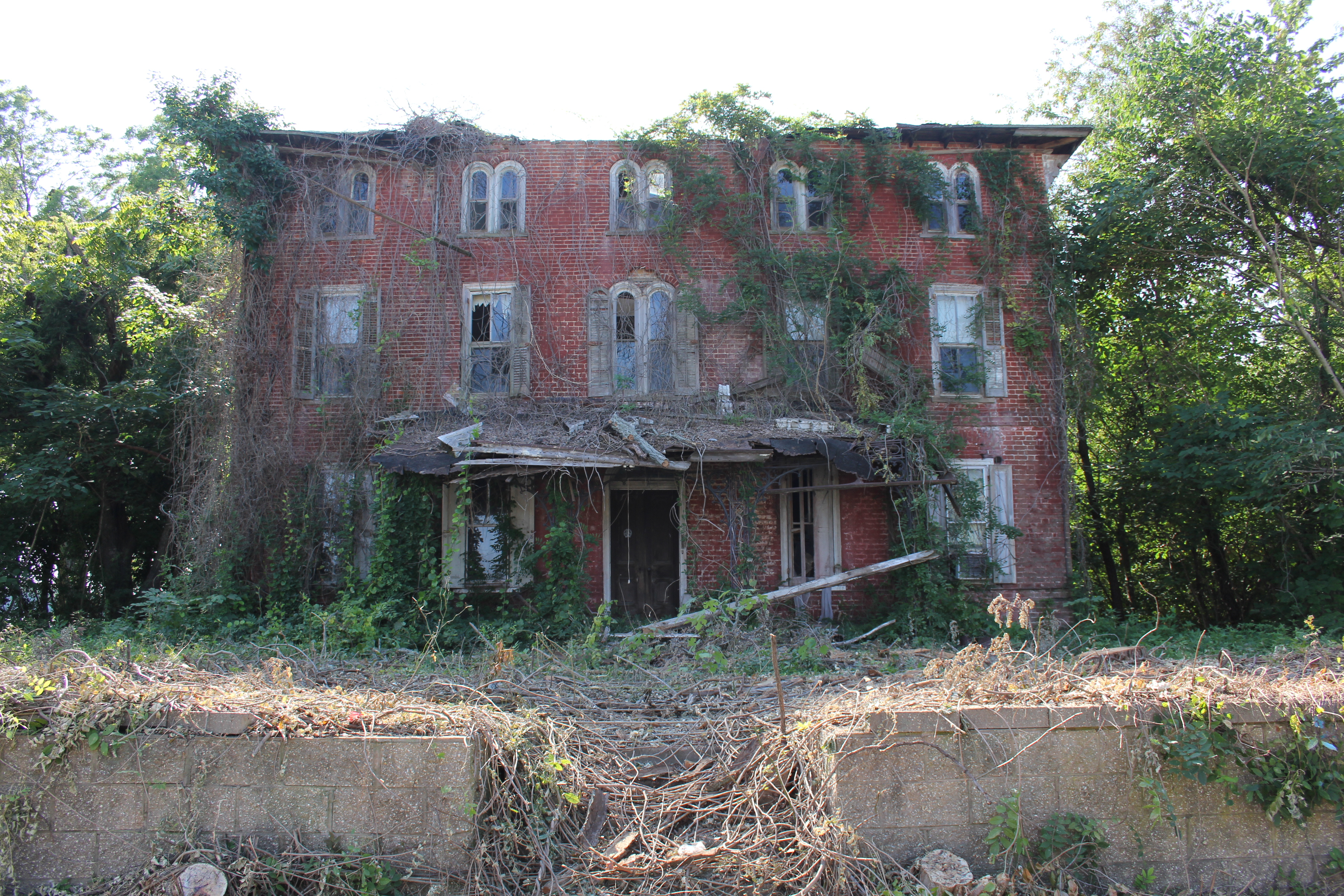
- House in 2015

- Location within Delaware Location within the United States
- Location: Delaware Route 1 and Bowers Beach Road, Little Heaven, Delaware
- Coordinates: 39°2′30″N 75°27′27″W
- Area: 5 acres (2.0 ha)
- Built: 1771, 1868
- Demolished: July 16, 2017
- NRHP reference No.: 73000500
- Added to NRHP: June 4, 1973

The Jehu Reed House was a historic home located in Little Heaven, Kent County, Delaware. It was built in 1771 and expanded and remodeled in 1868. It was a three-story, five-bay, brick dwelling, with a lower, three-bay rear wing containing the kitchen and servants' quarters. The main section had a hipped roof and a Victorian porch with decorative ironwork.

It was listed on the National Register of Historic Places in 1973.

After decades of neglect, including partial collapse of the front facade, the house was demolished on July 16, 2017.
