= Bishop's House (Portland, Oregon) =

Historic building in Portland, Oregon, U.S.

- U.S. National Register of Historic Places
- Portland Historic Landmark
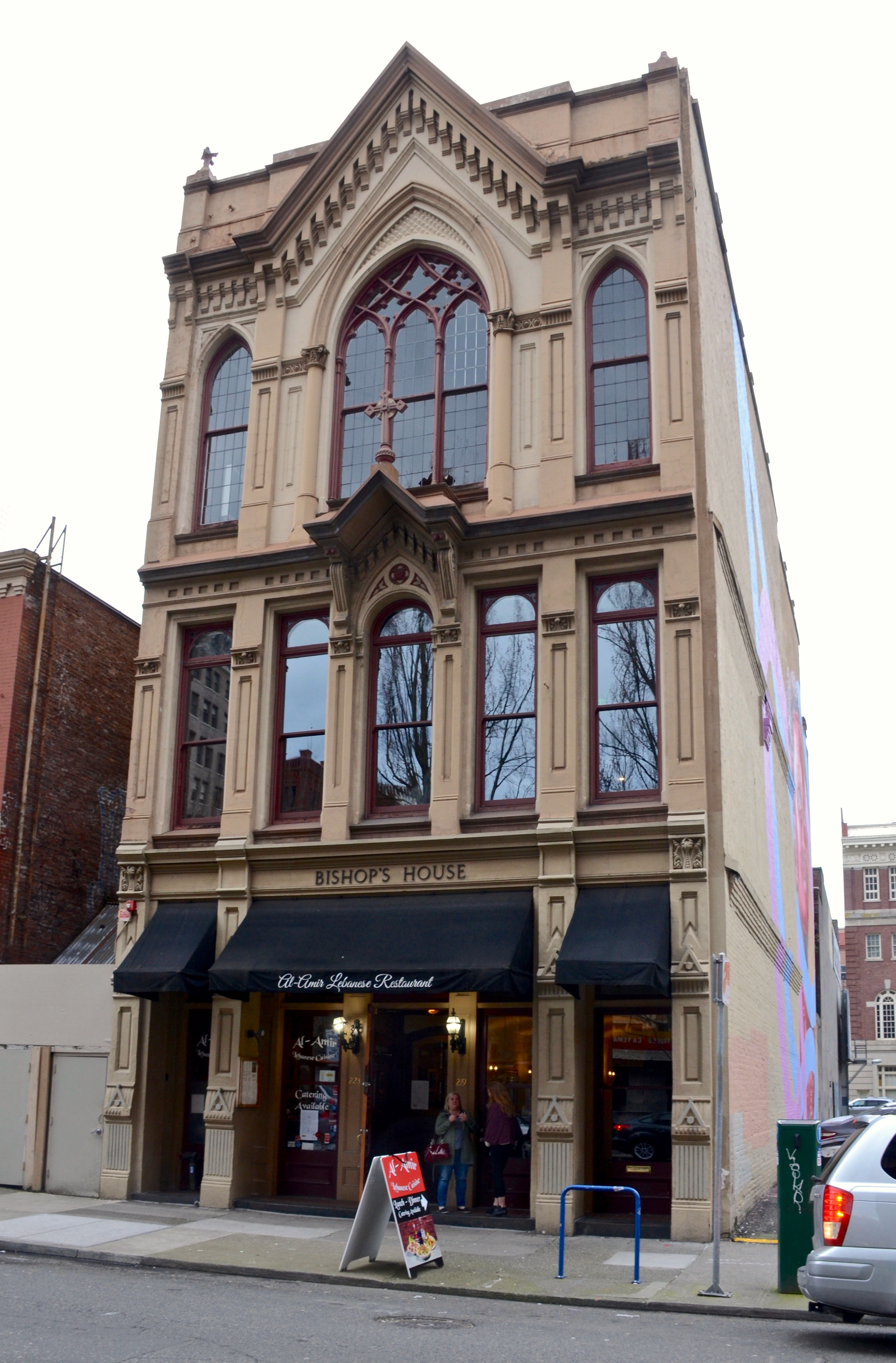
- Bishop's House in 2018

- Location within Portland, Oregon Location within Oregon Location within the United States
- Location: 219–223 SW Stark Street; Portland, Oregon
- Coordinates: 45°31′13″N 122°40′26″W
- Built: 1879
- Architect: Prosper Heurn
- Architectural style: Gothic
- NRHP reference No.: 74001706
- Added to NRHP: October 18, 1974

Bishop's House is a historic building in downtown, Portland, Oregon. It is in the city's Yamhill Historic District.

When the seat of the Roman Catholic Archdiocese was moved to Portland from Oregon City, Archbishop William Hickley Gross constructed the Bishop's House as his official residence. Part of the property the cathedral was built upon was donated by Benjamin Stark. Seventeen years later, in 1879, the Bishop's House, the official residence of Archbishop William Hickley Gross, was constructed next door. Both the cathedral and the Bishop's House were built in the neo-Gothic style. The granite foundation of Bishop's House was quarried in Northern Montana and transported down the Columbia River.

By 1878, noting the size limitations of the then-existing cathedral and the expanding population into the area, "the need for a new, more elegant cathedral became apparent." Dedication of the new pro-cathedral site, situated at 15th & Davis, occurred in 1885.

Plans and construction, however, were already underway to construct a new episcopal residence next-door to the existing cathedral. The Bishop's House was completed in 1879. It did not, however, become the official episcopal residence until 1893 and then for only two years. By then, the new pro-cathedral construction was completed and the cathedral next door was demolished in February 1895. The episcopal residence was moved to near the new pro-cathedral the same month.

A major renovation took place in 1965, and Bishop's House was placed on the National Register of Historic Places in 1974. As of 2001, the building was occupied by offices, a Lebanese restaurant, and a startup named in its honor, Bishop House, LLC.

== See also ==
- Architecture of Portland, Oregon
- National Register of Historic Places listings in Southwest Portland, Oregon
