= Bishop House (Casper, Wyoming) =

Historic house in Wyoming, United States

- U.S. National Register of Historic Places
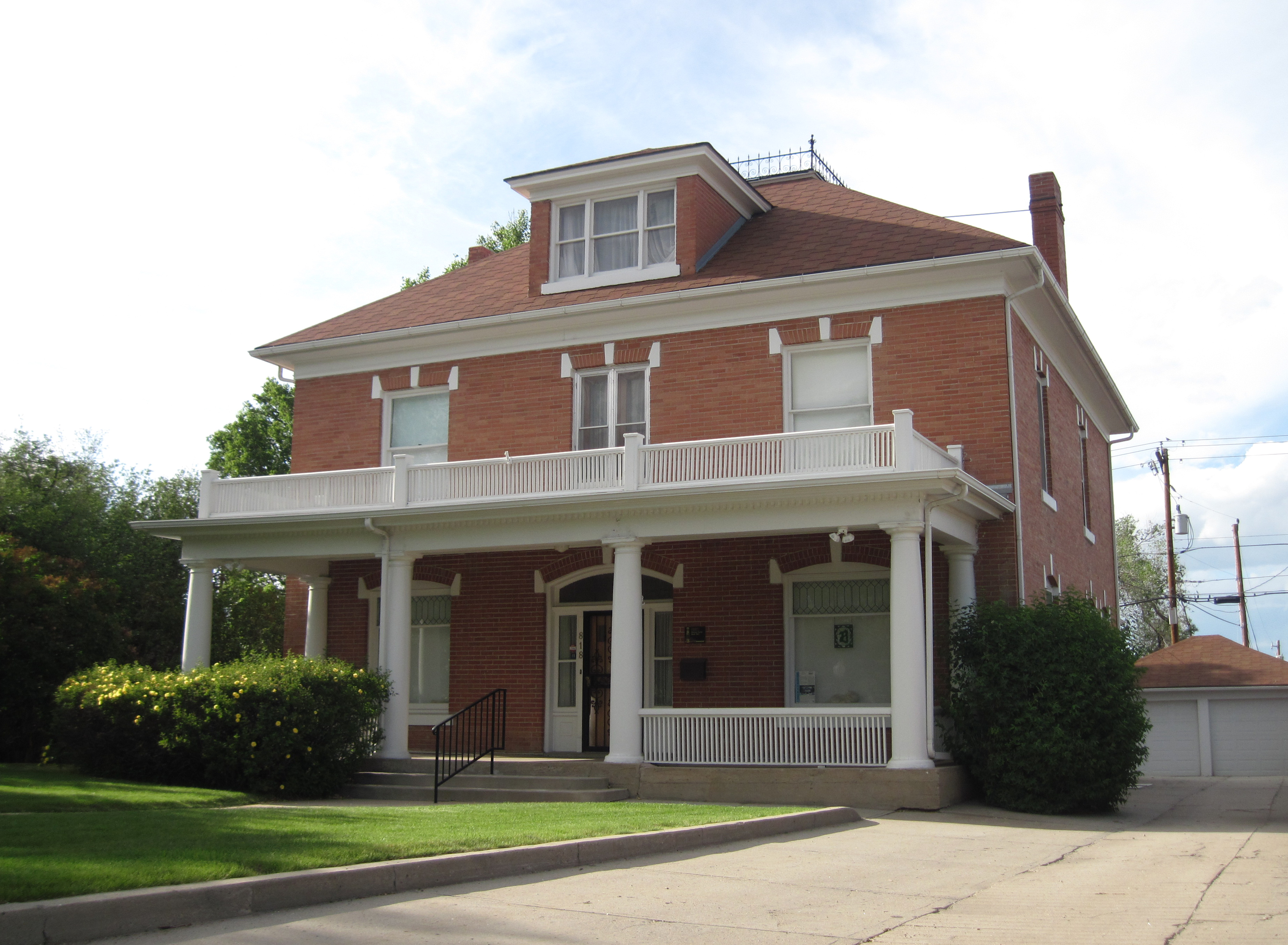
- Front façade, 2012

- Location within Wyoming Location within the United States
- Location: 818 E. Second St., Casper, Wyoming
- Coordinates: 42°50′56.4″N 106°18′52.8″W
- Built: 1907
- Architect: Miller, Elias N.; Evans, W.T.
- Architectural style: Colonial Revival
- NRHP reference No.: 01000270
- Added to NRHP: March 12, 2001

The Bishop House in Casper, Wyoming was built in 1907. It was listed on the National Register of Historic Places in 2001.

== Description ==
The Bishop House is a 2 1/2-story foursquare house in Casper, Wyoming. It was built in 1907 in the Colonial Revival style and features a widow's walk. The home's red exterior bricks were shipped from Denver. A full porch, supported by four Tuscan columns, extends across the front of the house.

== History ==
The Bishop House was the first multi-storied brick home in Casper, Wyoming. Built in the city's Capitol Hill addition, the home was constructed for Marvin Lord Bishop, Sr., and was based on his childhood home in the Shenandoah Valley of Virginia. Its architect was Elias N. Miller of Denver, and its builder was William T. Evans, for whom Evansville, Wyoming is named.

After M. L. Bishop died in 1939, his wife, Leona, continued to live in the residence until her death in 1948. Their youngest daughter, Lucile L. Bishop, lived in the Bishop House from 1908 to her death in 1997. In 2001, the structure was placed on the National Register of Historic Places. The home is now owned by the Cadoma Foundation and used for community events.
