= Bishop House (Taganrog) =

Historic house in Taganrog, Rostov, Russia

Coordinates: 47°12′38″N 38°55′06″E

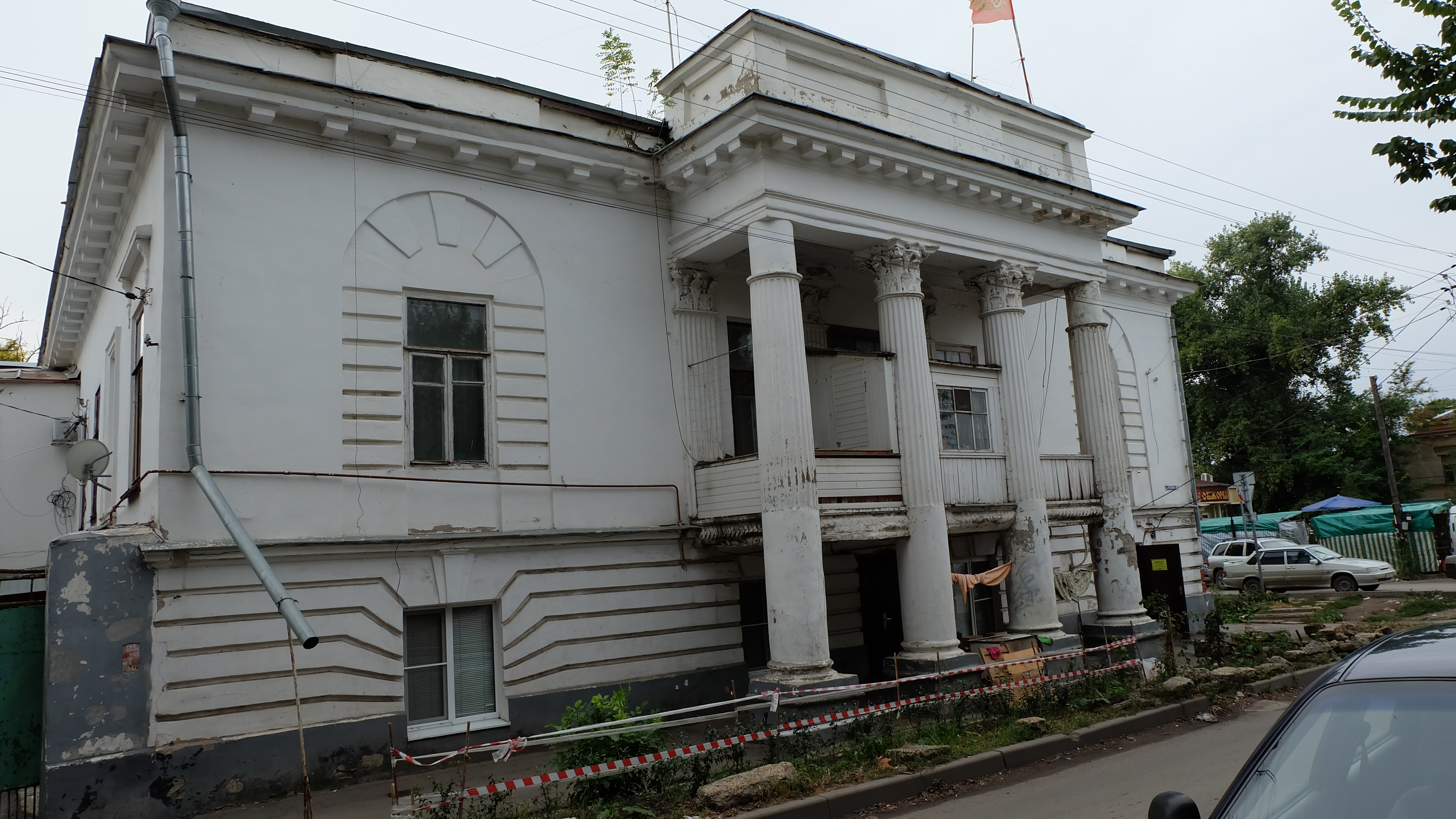
2016

Bishop's House, also known as Kirsanov's house, is one-and-a-half-storey building at 129, Chekhov street, Taganrog, Rostov region, Russia. It is one of the listed buildings in Rostov region, it has been in the regional List of heritage registers since November 1992.

== History ==
It was built in 1824 and was owned by a general Kh. P. Kirsanov. In 1860 ownership passed to another general, Alexandrovsky, that laid out a garden behind the house with Italian sculptures made of white marble. In 1890 the house was sold to the town council, and then an artillery brigade and sick quarters were located there. A local bishop's apartments and his office as well a home church were located in the house since 1911. The church was active until 1950s, then it was closed and the house was converted into a communal flat (in which kitchen and toilet facilities are shared by a number of tenants).

== Description ==
The ground floor is rusticated outside. The columns are connected to the balustrade at the level of the first floor. The cornice of the building is decorated with a number of small projections - dentils, which are in the shape of rectangles. The first floor has got high semicircular windows with rusticated frames. The house has a covered gallery, its overlap rests on four columns of the Corinthian order. The columns are decorated with flutes on high bases, foundations of the columns rest on the ground. Over a frieze there is an attic with 4 niches: two of them are located on the main facade, and the last ones are on the side walls. Kirsanov's house is a common example of Taganrog buildings and is designed in the classical style. The house needs renovation but it is absent in the List of buildings and facilities that must be reconstructed in the first place to preserve a historical face of Taganrog.
