= Bishop House (Falmouth, Kentucky) =

- U.S. National Register of Historic Places
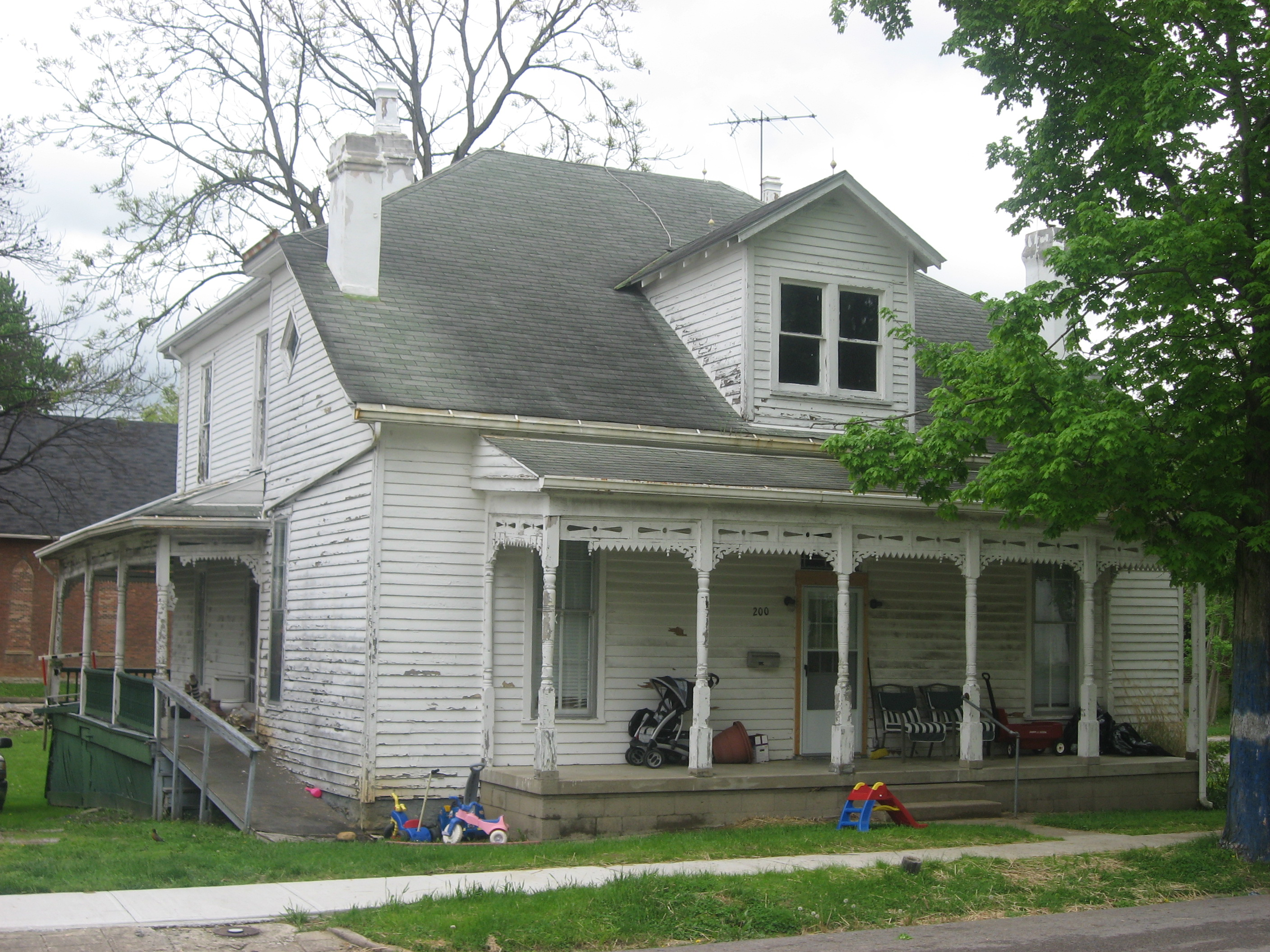

- Location within Kentucky Location within the United States
- Location: 200 4th St., Falmouth, Kentucky
- Coordinates: 38°40′35″N 84°19′55″W
- Area: less than one acre
- Built: 1880
- Architectural style: Eclectic
- MPS: Falmouth MRA
- NRHP reference No.: 83002846
- Added to NRHP: March 4, 1983

The Bishop House in Falmouth, Kentucky, at 200 4th St., was built in 1880 to serve as a residence and store. It was listed on the National Register of Historic Places in 1983.

It was deemed notable as a good example of a late 19th century eclectic vernacular frame house.

Its original owner was Bemard H. Piening, about whom not much is known.
