= Falmouth, Kentucky =

- City
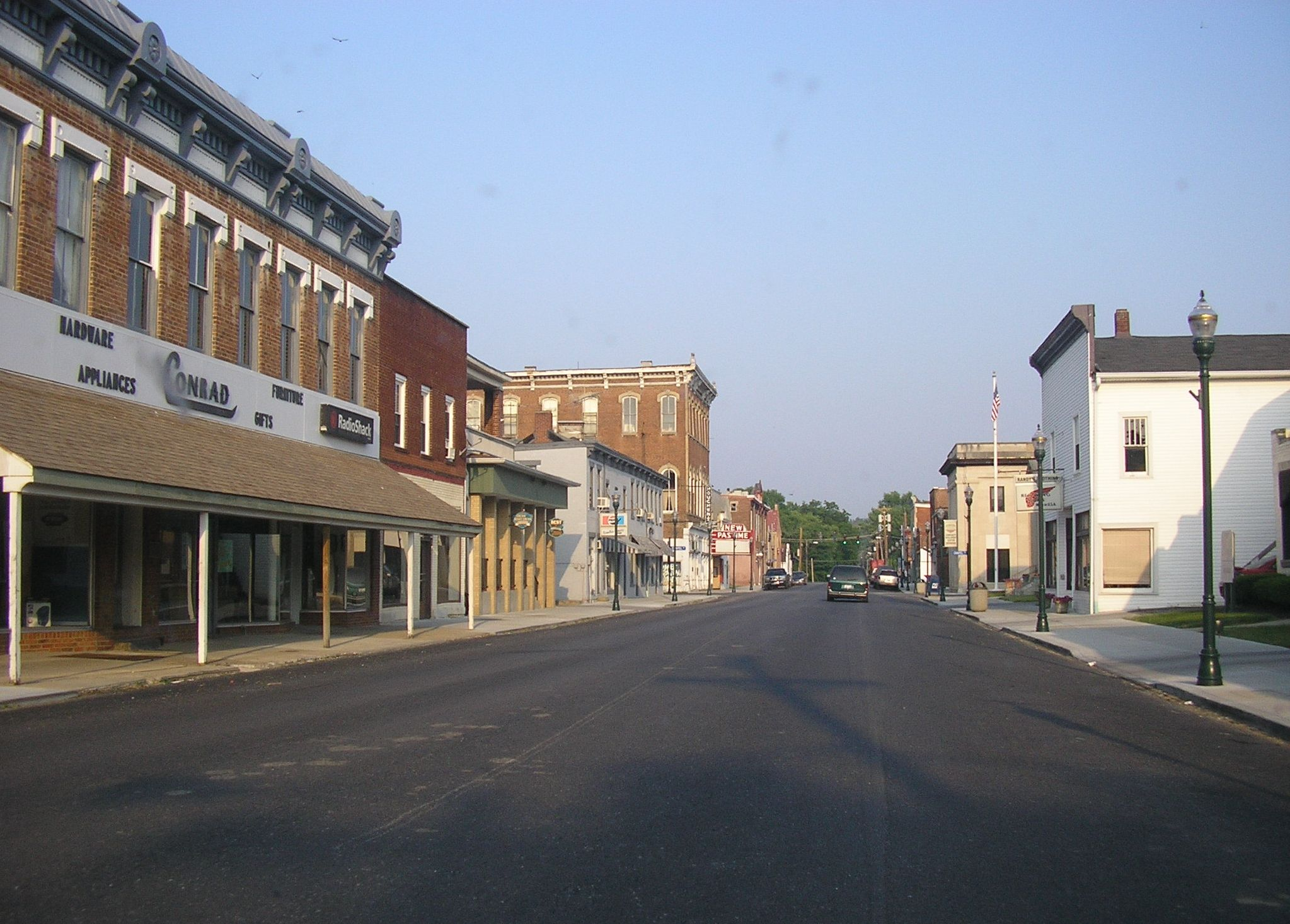
- Downtown Falmouth

- Location of Falmouth in Pendleton County, Kentucky.
- Coordinates: 38°40′15″N 84°19′52″W
- Country: United States
- State: Kentucky
- County: Pendleton

Area
  - Total: 1.38 sq mi (3.58 km^{2})
  - Land: 1.36 sq mi (3.52 km^{2})
  - Water: 0.019 sq mi (0.05 km^{2})
- Elevation: 564 ft (172 m)

Population (2020)
  - Total: 2,216
  - Estimate (2022): 2,192
  - Density: 1,629.6/sq mi (629.21/km^{2})
- Time zone: UTC-5 (Eastern (EST))
  - Summer (DST): UTC-4 (EDT)
- ZIP code: 41040
- Area code: 859
- FIPS code: 21-26434
- GNIS feature ID: 2403595
- Website: cityoffalmouth.com

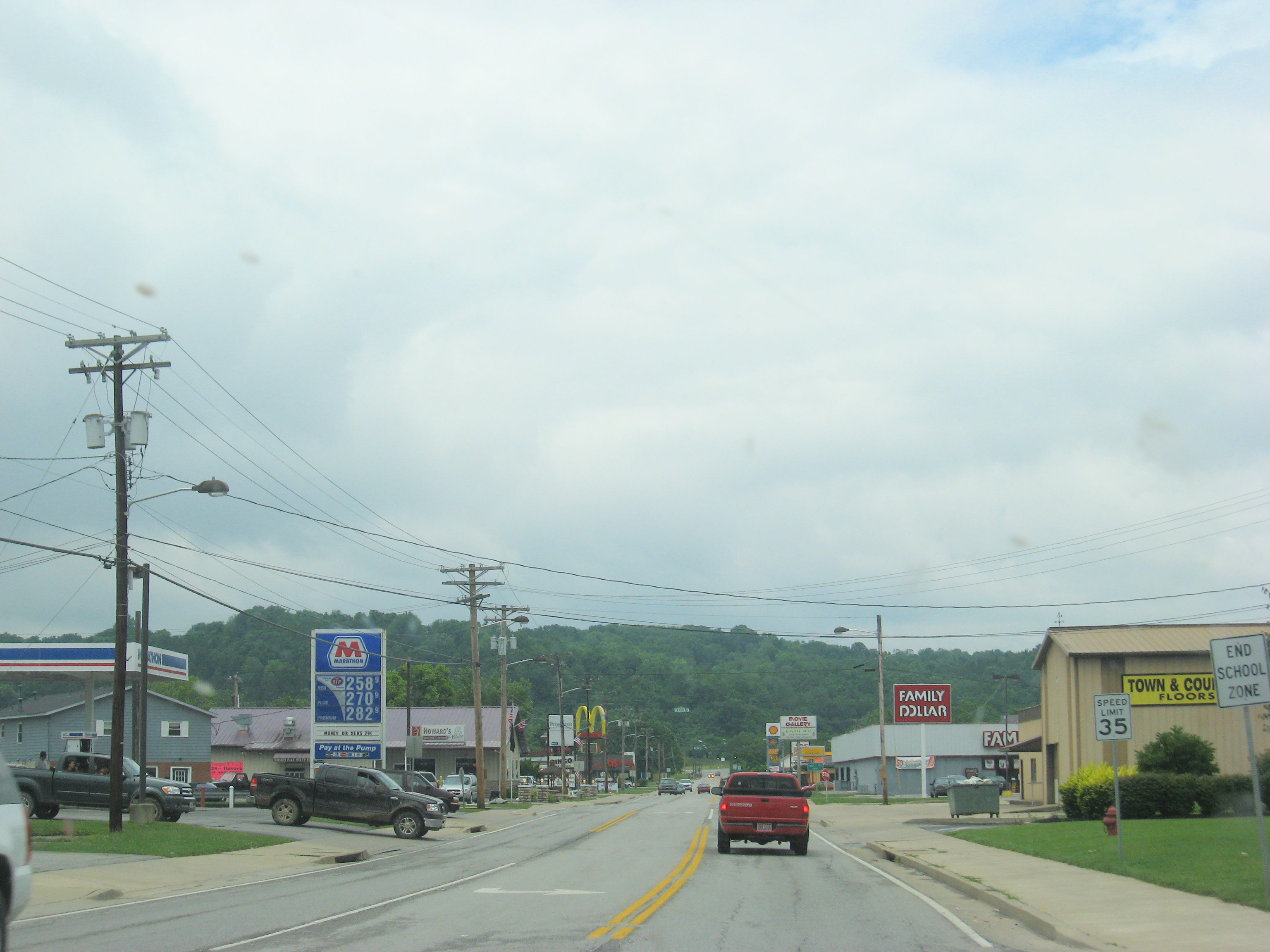
Along U.S. Route 27 on Falmouth's edge.

Falmouth is a home rule-class city in, and the county seat of, Pendleton County, Kentucky, in the United States. As of the 2020 census, Falmouth had a population of 2,216. It lies at the confluence of the South and Main forks of the Licking River and is home to Kincaid Regional Theatre.

== Geography ==
According to the United States Census Bureau, the city has a total area of 1.3 square miles (3.4 km^{2}), all land.

== History ==
Possibly settled as early as 1780, Falmouth was laid out by John Waller (1758–1823) and formally established by the state assembly in 1793. Waller named the new settlement after his native Falmouth, Virginia. It was incorporated as a city in 1856.

The town is perhaps best remembered for natural disasters that have devastated the town over the last half of the 20th century. In 1964, the Licking River reached 47 feet (19 feet above flood stage) and left much of the town under water. On April 23, 1968 an F4 (possibly F5) tornado leveled many homes in the town, killing four people. On March 2, 1997, a major flood on the Licking River again left the town crippled. The river reached 52 feet (24 feet above flood stage) and left 80% of the town under several feet of water. Many homes and businesses were damaged and five residents were killed.

Charity's House and Elzey Hughes House were both part of the historically African-American "Happy Hollow" neighborhood and each is listed on the National Register of Historic Places.

== Arts and culture ==
Kincaid Regional Theatre, also referred to as KRT, has called Falmouth home since 1983. Since the theatre's founding, KRT has achieved musical theatre excellence by employing local talent from the Cincinnati metropolitan area and beyond. With the help of many supporters, KRT continues to enhance the arts in the community with children and teens theatre workshops and through involvement with local schools. Originally operated at the former Falmouth High School. Other venues have included the Griffin Centre Amphitheatre. KRT now performs at Stonewood Gardens, also in Falmouth.

Falmouth plays host to one of Kentucky's largest fall events, the Kentucky Wool Festival. The Wool Festival is an annual event held adjacent to Kincaid Lake State Park during the first full weekend of October. The festival promotes wool products, crafts, food, among other products. The festival provides fundraising activities to local organizations and entertainment for all age groups. Heritage demonstrations and livestock exhibitions also highlight Pendleton County and Kentucky history. The Kentucky Wool Festival has inspired the local community to adopt the sheep as its unofficial mascot.

== Demographics ==
Historical population
Census	Pop.	Note	%±
1800	40		—
1810	121		202.5%
1830	207		—
1860	315		—
1870	614		94.9%
1880	967		57.5%
1890	1,146		18.5%
1900	1,134		−1.0%
1910	1,180		4.1%
1920	1,330		12.7%
1930	1,876		41.1%
1940	2,099		11.9%
1950	2,186		4.1%
1960	2,568		17.5%
1970	2,593		1.0%
1980	2,482		−4.3%
1990	2,378		−4.2%
2000	2,058		−13.5%
2010	2,169		5.4%
2020	2,216		2.2%
2022 (est.)	2,192		−1.1%
U.S. Decennial Census

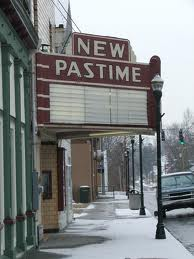
Buildings in Downtown Falmouth

=== 2020 census ===
As of the 2020 census, Falmouth had a population of 2,216. The median age was 35.7 years. 26.5% of residents were under the age of 18 and 13.8% of residents were 65 years of age or older. For every 100 females there were 93.4 males, and for every 100 females age 18 and over there were 88.2 males age 18 and over.

0.0% of residents lived in urban areas, while 100.0% lived in rural areas.

There were 867 households in Falmouth, of which 34.7% had children under the age of 18 living in them. Of all households, 33.3% were married-couple households, 18.8% were households with a male householder and no spouse or partner present, and 34.8% were households with a female householder and no spouse or partner present. About 34.8% of all households were made up of individuals and 15.6% had someone living alone who was 65 years of age or older.

There were 1,021 housing units, of which 15.1% were vacant. The homeowner vacancy rate was 1.3% and the rental vacancy rate was 7.5%.

Racial composition as of the 2020 census
Race	Number	Percent
White	2,070	93.4%
Black or African American	30	1.4%
American Indian and Alaska Native	0	0.0%
Asian	13	0.6%
Native Hawaiian and Other Pacific Islander	0	0.0%
Some other race	19	0.9%
Two or more races	84	3.8%
Hispanic or Latino (of any race)	40	1.8%

=== 2000 census ===
As of the census of 2000, there were 2,058 people, 849 households, and 521 families residing in the city. The population density was 1,598.9 inhabitants per square mile (617.3/km^{2}). There were 988 housing units at an average density of 767.6 per square mile (296.4/km^{2}). The racial makeup of the city was 96.21% White, 1.90% African American, 0.63% Native American, 0.10% Asian, 0.63% from other races, and 0.53% from two or more races. Hispanic or Latino of any race were 1.36% of the population.

There were 849 households, out of which 31.1% had children under the age of 18 living with them, 41.7% were married couples living together, 15.3% had a female householder with no husband present, and 38.6% were non-families. 34.7% of all households were made up of individuals, and 18.5% had someone living alone who was 65 years of age or older. The average household size was 2.34 and the average family size was 3.03.

In the city, the population was spread out, with 25.9% under the age of 18, 9.4% from 18 to 24, 28.1% from 25 to 44, 19.3% from 45 to 64, and 17.2% who were 65 years of age or older. The median age was 37 years. For every 100 females, there were 89.9 males. For every 100 females age 18 and over, there were 82.4 males.

The median income for a household in the city was $25,114, and the median income for a family was $36,250. Males had a median income of $31,012 versus $20,781 for females. The per capita income for the city was $15,634. About 16.5% of families and 19.0% of the population were below the poverty line, including 22.9% of those under age 18 and 16.3% of those age 65 or over.

== Education ==
Falmouth has a lending library, the Pendleton County Public Library.

== Notable people ==
- Beth Broderick, actress on Sabrina, the Teenage Witch
- Samuel Thomas Hauser, born in Falmouth, became territorial governor of Montana
- John Merritt, one of college football's winningest coaches.
- Phillip Allen Sharp, earned the Nobel Prize for work that changed scientists' understanding of the structure of genes
- Dontaie Allen, the 2019 Kentucky Mr. Basketball.
