= Kentucky =

U.S. state

- State
- Commonwealth of Kentucky
- Flag Seal
- Nickname: The Bluegrass State
- Motto(s): United we stand, divided we fall Deo gratiam habeamus (Let us be grateful to God)
- Anthem: My Old Kentucky Home
- Location of Kentucky within the United States
- Country: United States
- Before statehood: Part of Virginia (District of Kentucky)
- Admitted to the Union: June 1, 1792 (15th)
- Capital: Frankfort
- Largest city: Louisville
- Largest county or equivalent: Jefferson
- Largest metro and urban areas: Louisville (Note: However, a portion of the larger Cincinnati metropolitan area does extend into the state.)

Government
  - Governor: Andy Beshear (D)
  - Lieutenant Governor: Jacqueline Coleman (D)
- Legislature: General Assembly
  - Upper house: Senate
  - Lower house: House of Representatives
- Judiciary: Kentucky Supreme Court
- U.S. senators: Mitch McConnell (R); Rand Paul (R)
- U.S. House delegation: 5 Republicans; 1 Democrat (list)

Area
  - Total: 40,408 sq mi (104,656 km^{2})
  - Land: 39,486 sq mi (102,269 km^{2})
  - Water: 922 sq mi (2,387 km^{2}) 2.2%
  - Rank: 37th

Dimensions
  - Length: 400 mi (640 km)
  - Width: 188 mi (302 km)
- Elevation: 750 ft (230 m)
- Highest elevation (Black Mountain (Note: Elevation adjusted to North American Vertical Datum of 1988)): 4,150 ft (1,265 m)
- Lowest elevation (Mississippi River at Kentucky Bend): 256 ft (78 m)

Population (2025)
  - Total: ▲4,606,864
  - Rank: 26th
  - Density: 110/sq mi (44/km^{2})
  - Rank: 24th
  - Median household income: $61,100 (2023)
  - Income rank: 46th
- Demonym: Kentuckian

Language
  - Official language: English

Time zones
- Eastern half: UTC−05:00 (EST)
  - Summer (DST): UTC−04:00 (EDT)
- Western half: UTC−06:00 (CST)
  - Summer (DST): UTC−05:00 (CDT)
- USPS abbreviation: KY
- ISO 3166 code: US-KY
- Traditional abbreviation: Ky
- Latitude: 36° 30′ N to 39° 09′ N
- Longitude: 81° 58′ W to 89° 34′ W
- Website: kentucky.gov

State symbols of Kentucky
List of state symbols
- Flag of Kentucky

- Seal of Kentucky
- Slogan: Kentucky Unbridled Spirit

Living insignia
- Bird: Cardinal
- Butterfly: Viceroy butterfly
- Fish: Kentucky spotted bass
- Flower: Goldenrod
- Horse breed: Thoroughbred
- Insect: Western honeybee
- Mushroom: Indigo milkcap
- Tree: Tulip poplar
- Wildlife animal: Gray squirrel

Inanimate insignia
- Beverage: Milk; Ale-8-One
- Dance: Clogging
- Food: Blackberry
- Fossil: Brachiopod
- Gemstone: Kentucky agate
- Mineral: Calcite
- Rock: Coal
- Soil: Crider Soil Series
- Other: Chevrolet Corvette (state sports car)

State route marker

State quarter
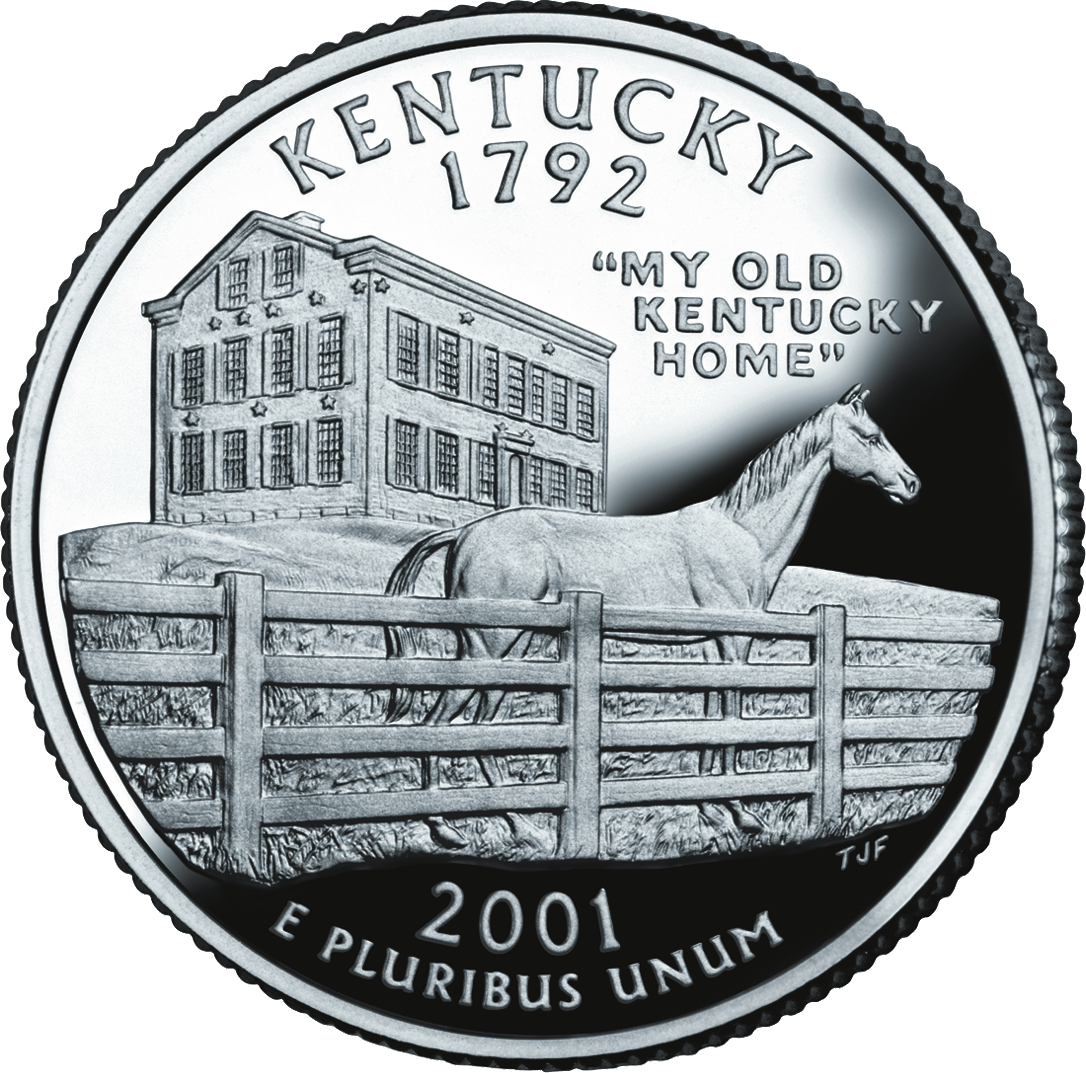
- Released in 2001

Kentucky (US: /kənˈtʌki/, UK: /kɛn-/), officially the Commonwealth of Kentucky, (Note: Kentucky is one of only four U.S. states to use the term "Commonwealth" in its official name, along with Massachusetts, Virginia, and Pennsylvania.) is a landlocked state in the Southeastern region of the United States. It borders Illinois, Indiana, and Ohio to the north, West Virginia to the northeast, Virginia to the east, Tennessee to the south, and Missouri to the west. Its northern border is defined by the Ohio River. Its capital is Frankfort and its most populous city is Louisville. As of 2024, the state's population was approximately 4.6 million.

Previously a part of Virginia, Kentucky was admitted into the Union as the fifteenth state on June 1, 1792. It is known as the "Bluegrass State" in reference to Kentucky bluegrass, a species of grass introduced by European settlers, which has long supported the state's thoroughbred horse industry.

The fertile soil in the central and western parts of the state led to the development of large tobacco plantations similar to those in Virginia and North Carolina, which utilized slave labor prior to the passage of the Thirteenth Amendment. Kentucky ranks fifth nationally in goat farming, eighth in beef cattle production, and fourteenth in corn production. While Kentucky has been a long-standing center for the tobacco industry, its economy has diversified into non-agricultural sectors including auto manufacturing, energy production, and medicine. Kentucky ranks fourth among US states in the number of automobiles and trucks assembled. It is one of several states considered part of the Upland South.

The state is home to the world's longest known cave system in Mammoth Cave National Park, and the nation's two largest artificial lakes east of the Mississippi River. Cultural aspects of Kentucky include horse racing, bourbon, moonshine, coal mining, My Old Kentucky Home State Park, automobile manufacturing, tobacco, Southern cuisine, barbecue, bluegrass music, college basketball, Louisville Slugger baseball bats, and Kentucky Fried Chicken.

== Etymology ==
Prior to 1769, Botetourt County and successor counties in the Colony of Virginia, whose geographical extent was south of the Ohio and Allegheny Rivers beyond the Appalachian Mountains, became known to European Americans as Kentucky (or Kentucke) country. It was named for the Kentucky River, a tributary of the Ohio.

The precise etymology of the name is uncertain. One theory sees the word based on an Iroquoian name meaning "(on) the meadow" or "(on) the prairie" (cf. Mohawk kenhtà:ke; Seneca gëdá'geh ([kɛ̃taʔkɛh]), both meaning "at the field"). Another theory suggests a derivation from the term Kenta Aki, which could have come from an Algonquian language, in particular from Shawnee. Folk etymology translates this as "Land of Our Fathers". The closest approximation in another Algonquian language, Ojibwe, translates as "Land of Our In-Laws", thus making a fairer English translation "The Land of Those Who Became Our Fathers". In any case, the word aki means "land" in most Algonquian languages.

== History ==
=== Native American settlement ===
The first archaeological evidence of human occupation of Kentucky is approximately 9500 BCE, and it was Clovis culture, primitive hunter-gatherers with stone tools. Around 1800 BCE, a gradual transition began from a hunter-gatherer economy to agriculturalism. Around 900 CE, a Mississippian culture took root in western and central Kentucky and a Fort Ancient culture appeared in eastern Kentucky. While the two had many similarities, the distinctive ceremonial earthwork mounds constructed in the former's centers were not part of the culture of the latter. Fort Ancient settlements depended largely on corn, beans, and squash, and practiced a system of agriculture that prevented ecological degradation by rotating crops, burning sections of forest to create ideal habitat for wild game, relocating villages every 10–30 years, and continually shifting the location of fields to maintain plots of land in various stages of ecological succession.

In about the 10th century, the Kentucky native people's variety of corn became highly productive, supplanting the Eastern Agricultural Complex and replacing it with maize-based agriculture in the Mississippian era. As of the 16th century, what became Kentucky was home to tribes from diverse linguistic groups. The Kispoko, an Algonquian-speaking tribe, controlled much of the interior of the state.

French explorers in the 17th century documented numerous tribes living in Kentucky until the Beaver Wars in the 1670s; however, by the time that European colonial explorers and settlers began entering Kentucky in greater numbers in the mid-18th century, there were no major Native American settlements in the region.

The Chickasaw had territory up to the confluence of Mississippi and Ohio rivers. During a period known as the Beaver Wars (1640–1680), another Algonquian tribe called the Maumee, or Mascouten was chased out of southern Michigan. The vast majority of them moved to Kentucky, pushing the Kispoko east and war broke out with the Tutelo of North Carolina and Virginia that pushed them further north and east. The Maumee were closely related to the Miami from Indiana. Later, the Kispoko merged with the Shawnee, who migrated from the east and the Ohio River valley.

A persistent myth, perpetuated in many popular and scholarly works, alleges that Native Americans never lived permanently in Kentucky, but rather used it only as a "hunting ground". According to early Kentucky historians, early European settlers encountered extensive evidence of permanent, advanced settlements, including numerous burial mounds, copper and stone artifacts, and what early historians describe as "fortifications:" large sites consisting of extensive walls enclosing the flat tops of bluffs, cliffs or mountains, constructed from stone that was quarried in the surrounding valleys and brought up to the summit. These sites and artifacts were sometimes explained as being the remnants of a "lost" white race, or some variously identified ethnic group predating and distinct from the Native Americans. More recent scholarship identifies the mound builders as the Mississippian and Fort Ancient peoples, which were distinct from the indigenous cultures encountered by settlers, although sharing the same origin in Paleoindian groups that inhabited the area for at least 12,000 years.

Beginning in the seventeenth century, before indigenous groups in Kentucky made direct contact with Europeans, articles of European origin such as glass beads entered the region via trade routes, and the appearance of mass graves suggests that European diseases were also introduced. By the eighteenth century, epidemics of disease had destabilized and changed the indigenous groups that inhabited Kentucky, causing some to reassemble into multi-tribal towns, and others to disperse further from the sphere of European influence. Around the end of the French and Indian War, as European settlers began to claim parts of the Bluegrass State, Native Americans abandoned their larger, more permanent villages south of the Ohio River and continued to maintain only small or transient settlements. This upheaval allowed the settlers to state that Kentucky was a hunting ground contested by multiple tribes but not permanently inhabited, when in reality it had only recently been abandoned due to social and political turmoil.

=== Early explorations: the discovery of Kentucky ===
European explorers arrived in Kentucky possibly as early as 1671. While French explorers surely spied Kentucky during expeditions on the Mississippi, there is no evidence French or Spanish explorers set foot in the lands south of the Ohio, notwithstanding speculations about Hernando de Soto and Robert de la Salle. The terrain in those days was not surveyed, so there is some uncertainty whether and to what extent the early English explorers out of Virginia set foot on the land. Confounding the issue is that the region south of the Ohio/Allegheny later known as Kentucky country was larger than the state of Kentucky today, encompassing most of today's West Virginia and (vaguely) part of southwestern Pennsylvania. Notable expeditions were Batts and Fallam 1671, Needham and Arthur 1673. Thomas Walker and surveyor Christopher Gist surveyed the area now known as Kentucky in 1750 and 1751.

=== European settlement: The Treaty of Fort Stanwix 1768 ===
As more settlers entered the area, warfare broke out with the Native Americans over their traditional hunting grounds.

June 16, 1774, James Harrod founded Harrod's Town (modern Harrodsburg). The settlement was abandoned during the conflict period of Dunmore's War, and resettled in March 1775, becoming the first permanent European settlement in Kentucky. It was followed within months by Boone's Station, Logan's Fort and Lexington before Kentucky was organized.

This period was the time of Daniel Boone's legendary expeditions starting in 1767 through the Cumberland Gap and down the Kentucky River to reach the bluegrass heartland of Kentucky.

While the Cherokee did not settle in Kentucky, they hunted there. They relinquished their hunting rights there in an extra-legal private contract with speculator Richard Henderson called Treaty of Sycamore Shoals in 1775.

=== Kentucky County and the Cherokee-American wars ===
On December 31, 1776, by an act of the Virginia General Assembly, the portion of Fincastle County west of the Big Sandy River (including today's Tug Fork tributary) terminating at the North Carolina border (today Tennessee) extending to the Mississippi River, previously most of what was known as Kentucky (or Kentucke) country, was split off into its own county of Kentucky. Harrod's Town (Oldtown as it was known at the time) was named the county seat.

A 1790 U.S. government report states that 1,500 Kentucky settlers had been killed by Native Americans since the end of the Revolutionary War.

=== Statehood ===
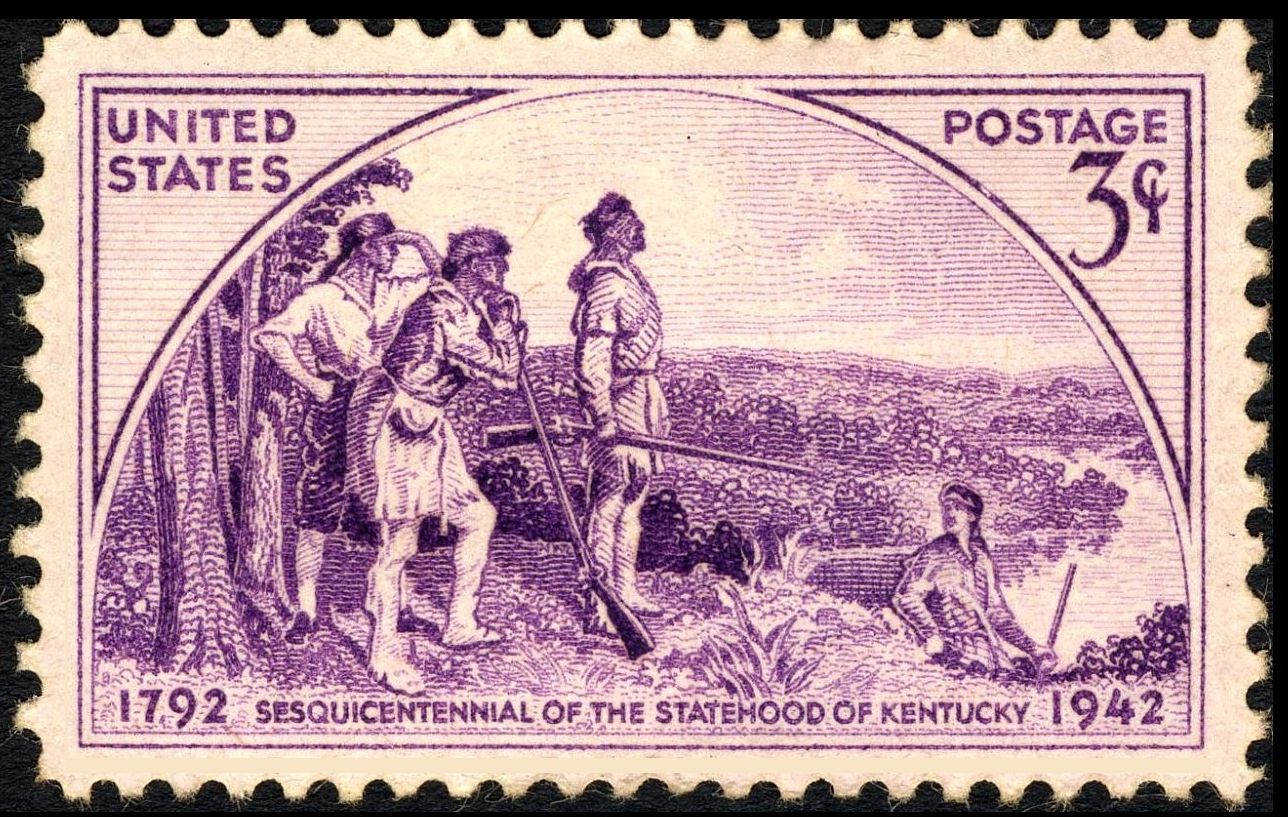
In 1942 the U.S. Post Office issued a postage stamp commemorating the 150th anniversary of Kentucky statehood, a 3-cent 1942 issue

The county was subdivided into Jefferson, Lincoln and Fayette Counties in 1780, but continued to be administered as the District of Kentucky even as new counties were split off.

On several occasions the region's residents petitioned the General Assembly and the Confederation Congress for separation from Virginia and statehood. Ten constitutional conventions were held in Danville between 1784 and 1792. One petition, which had Virginia's assent, came before the Confederation Congress in early July 1788. Unfortunately, its consideration came up a day after word of New Hampshire's all-important ninth ratification of the proposed Constitution, thus establishing it as the new framework of governance for the United States. In light of this development, Congress thought that it would be "unadvisable" to admit Kentucky into the Union, as it could do so "under the Articles of Confederation" only, but not "under the Constitution", and so declined to take action.

On December 18, 1789, Virginia again gave its consent to Kentucky statehood. The United States Congress gave its approval on February 4, 1791. (This occurred two weeks before Congress approved Vermont's petition for statehood.) Kentucky officially became the fifteenth state in the Union on June 1, 1792. Isaac Shelby, a military veteran from Virginia, was elected its first Governor.

=== Post-colonial plantation economy ===
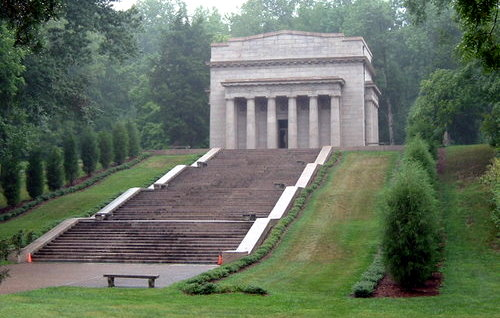
Abraham Lincoln Birthplace near Hodgenville

The central Bluegrass region and the western portion of the state were the areas with the most slave owners. Planters cultivated tobacco and hemp on plantations with the use of slave labor, and were noted for their quality livestock. During the 19th century, Kentucky slaveholders began to sell unneeded slaves to the Deep South, with Louisville becoming a major slave market and departure port for slaves being transported down the Ohio River.

=== The Civil War ===
Kentucky was a heavily divided border slave state during the American Civil War, with the population split between Unionists and those sympathetic to the seceded Confederate States. Though the state had dueling Union and Confederate state governments, Kentucky remained part of the Union throughout the war – although it declared that it was officially "neutral", a position that Abraham Lincoln worked hard to honor. After a failed attempt by Confederate General Leonidas Polk to take the state for the Confederacy, the legislature petitioned the Union Army for assistance.

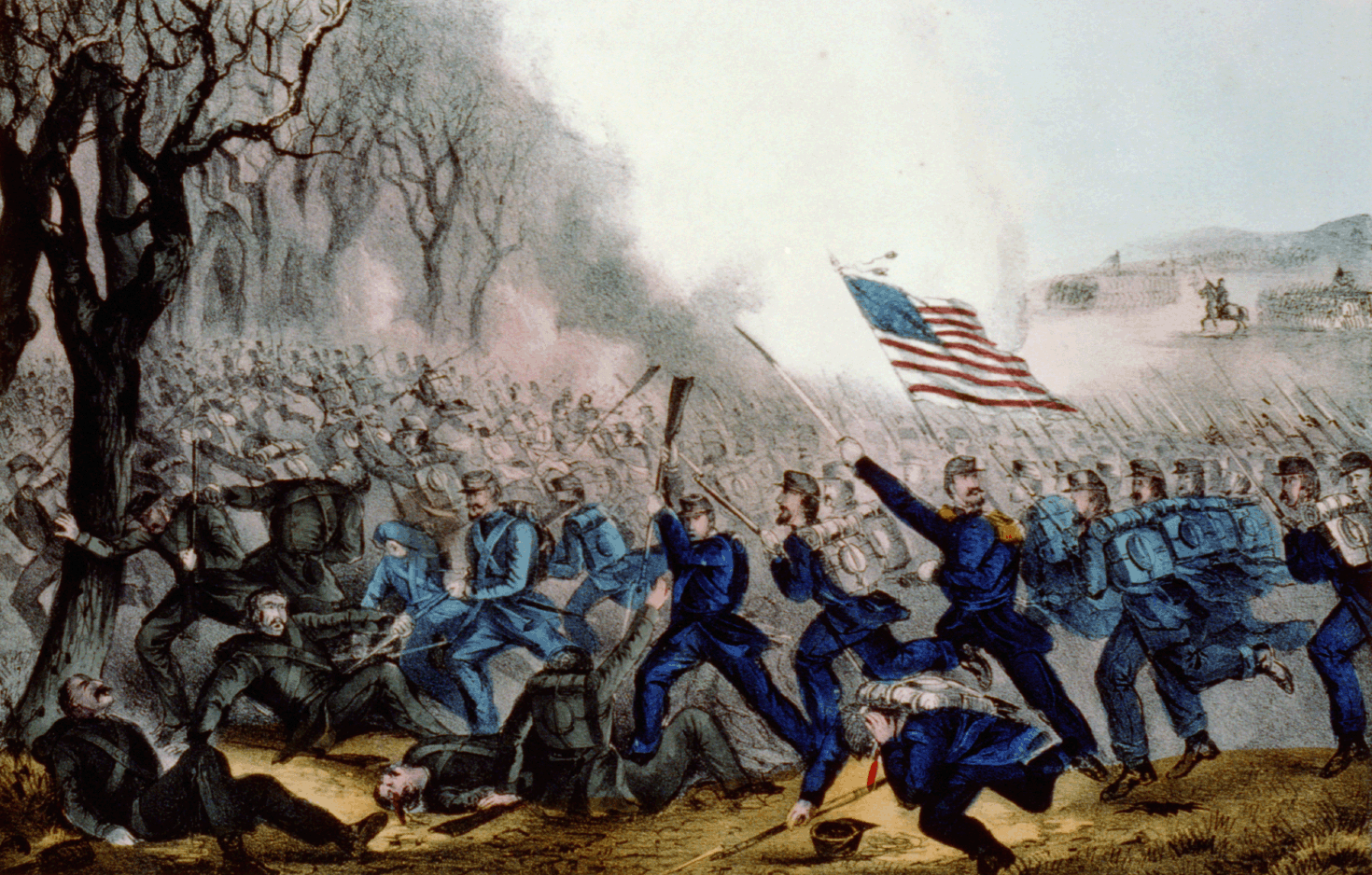
Depiction of the Battle of Mill Springs, which took place on January 19, 1862

In 1861, representatives from 68 of 110 counties, representing about half the state's territory, met at Russellville calling themselves the "Convention of the People of Kentucky" and passed an Ordinance of Secession on November 20. They established a Confederate government of Kentucky with its capital in Bowling Green, and Kentucky was officially admitted into the Confederacy on December 10, 1861, as the 13th Confederate state with full recognition in Richmond.

The Confederate shadow government was never popularly elected statewide. Although Confederate forces briefly controlled Frankfort, the state capital, they were expelled by Union forces before a Confederate government could be installed. With the expulsion of Confederate forces after the Battle of Perryville, this government operated in exile. Though it existed throughout the war, the Confederate government only had authority in areas of the state under its direct control, and had very little effect on the events in the commonwealth or in the war once they were driven out of the state.

Some 21st-century Kentuckians observe Confederate Memorial Day on Confederate leader Jefferson Davis' birthday, June 3, and participate in Confederate battle re-enactments. Both Davis and U.S. president Abraham Lincoln were born in Kentucky. John C. Breckinridge, the 14th and youngest-ever Vice President, and the Southern Democratic Party candidate for the Presidency in the 1860 election, was born near Lexington, Kentucky. Breckenridge was expelled from the U. S. Senate after he accepted a commission in the Confederate Army.

=== 20th century ===
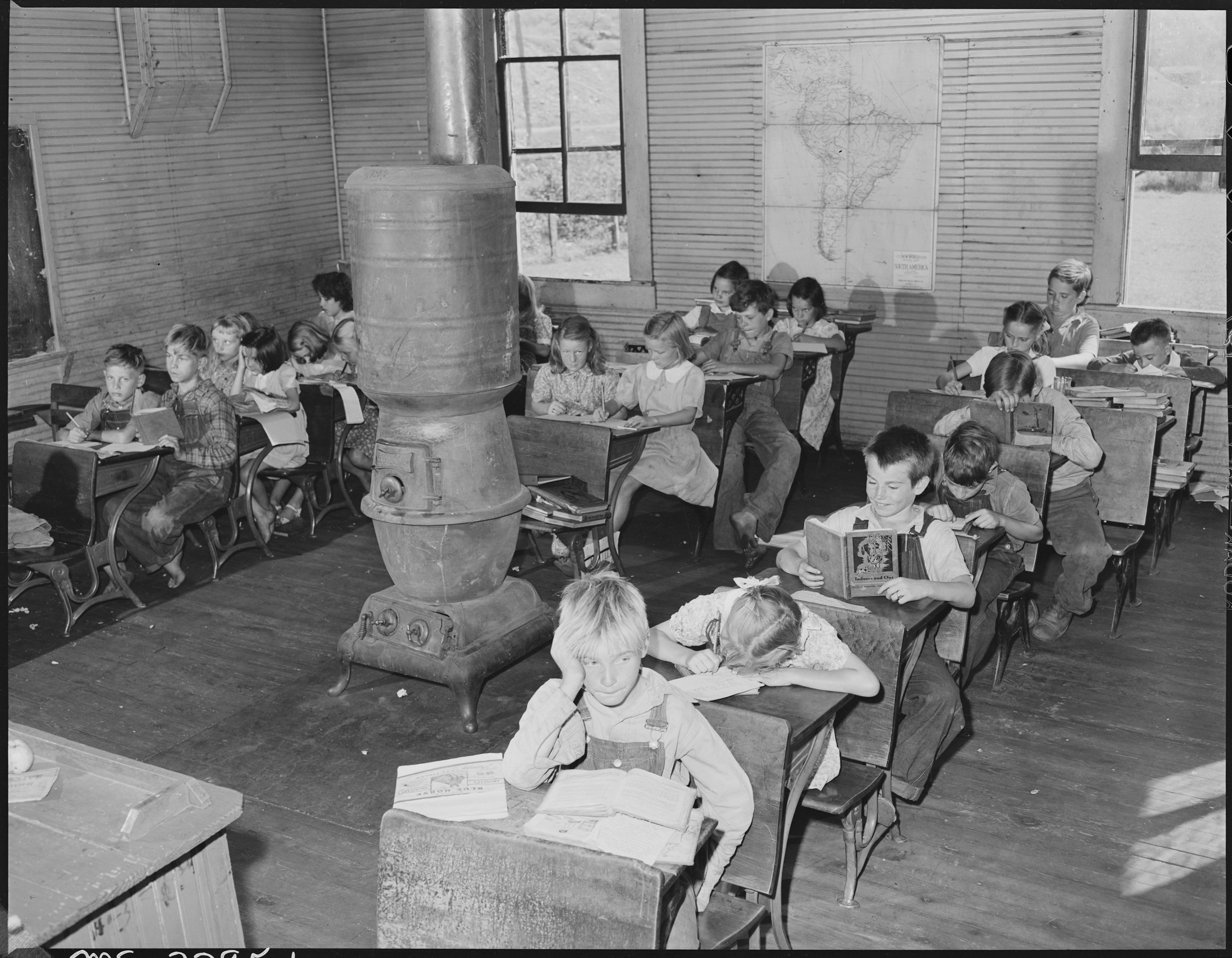
Students attending a crowded one-room schoolhouse with a single teacher in Fourmile, Kentucky, September 1946

On January 30, 1900, Governor William Goebel, flanked by two bodyguards, was mortally wounded by an assassin while walking to the State Capitol in downtown Frankfort. Goebel was contesting the Kentucky gubernatorial election of 1899, which William S. Taylor was initially believed to have won. For several months, J. C. W. Beckham, Goebel's running mate, and Taylor fought over who was the legal governor until the Supreme Court of the United States ruled in May in favor of Beckham. After fleeing to Indiana, Taylor was indicted as a co-conspirator in Goebel's assassination. Goebel is the only governor of a U.S. state to have been assassinated while in office.

The Black Patch Tobacco Wars, a vigilante action, occurred in Western Kentucky in the early 20th century. As a result of the tobacco industry monopoly, tobacco farmers in the area were forced to sell their crops at prices that were too low. Many local farmers and activists united in a refusal to sell their crops to the major tobacco companies.

An Association meeting occurred in downtown Guthrie, where a vigilante wing of "Night Riders", formed. The riders terrorized farmers who sold their tobacco at the low prices demanded by the tobacco corporations. They burned several tobacco warehouses throughout the area, stretching as far west as Hopkinsville to Princeton. In the later period of their operation, they were known to physically assault farmers who broke the boycott. Governor Augustus E. Willson declared martial law and deployed the Kentucky National Guard to end the wars.

== Geography ==
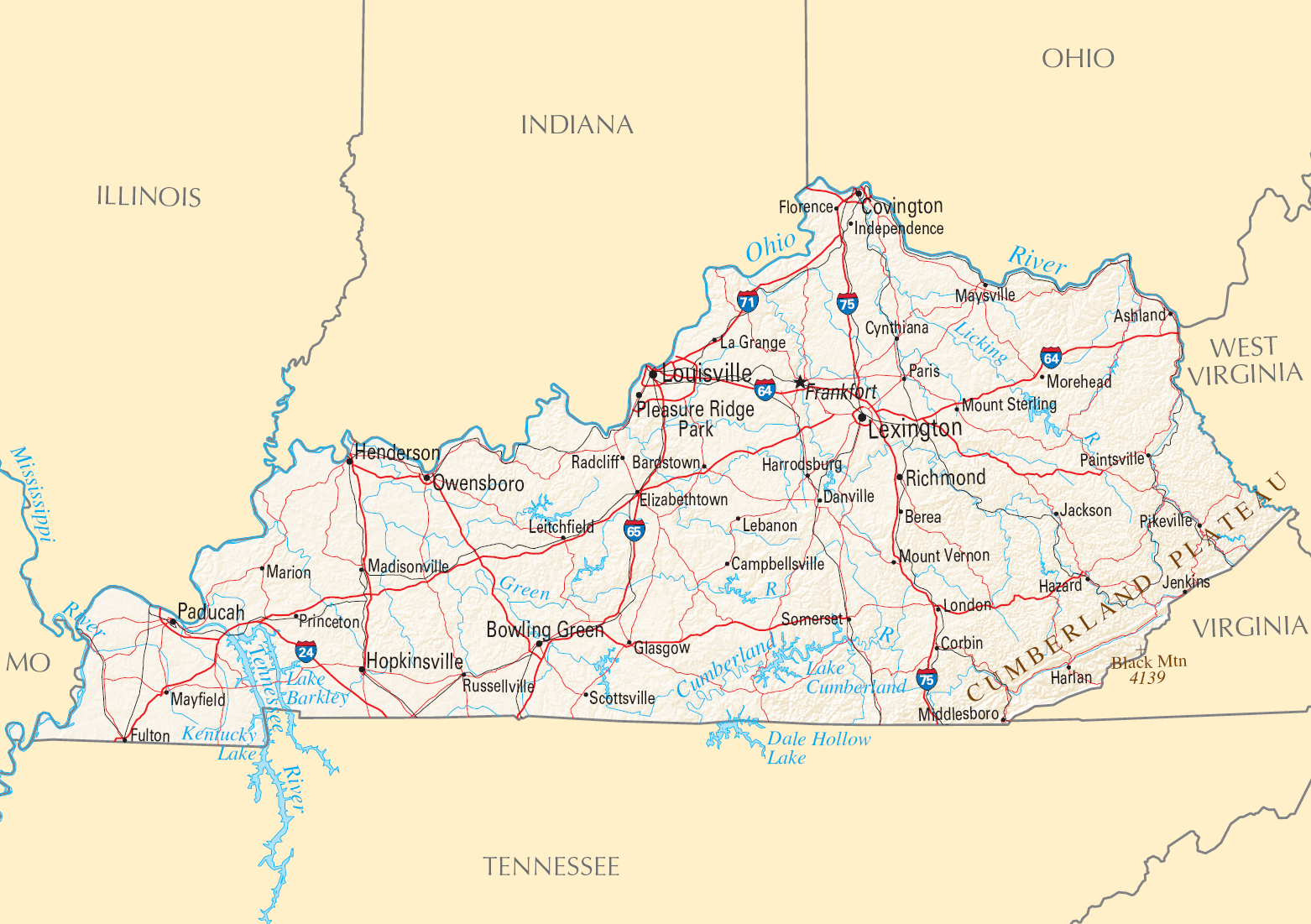
Map of Kentucky

Kentucky is situated in the Upland South. A significant portion of eastern Kentucky is part of Appalachia.

Kentucky borders seven states, from the Midwest and the Southeast. West Virginia lies to the northeast, Virginia to the east, Tennessee to the south, Missouri to the west, Illinois to the northwest, and Indiana and Ohio to the north. Only Missouri and Tennessee, both of which border eight states, touch more.

Kentucky's northern border is formed by the north shore of the Ohio River and its western border by the Mississippi River; however, the official border is based on the courses of the rivers as they existed when Kentucky became a state in 1792. For instance, northbound travelers on U.S. 41 from Henderson, after crossing the Ohio River, will be in Kentucky for about two miles (3 km). Ellis Park, a thoroughbred racetrack, is located in this small piece of Kentucky. Waterworks Road is part of the only land border between Indiana and Kentucky.

Kentucky has a non-contiguous part known as Kentucky Bend, at the far west corner of the state. It exists as an exclave surrounded by Missouri and Tennessee, and is included in the boundaries of Fulton County. Road access to this small part of Kentucky on the Mississippi River (populated by 18 people as of 2010) requires traveling through Tennessee.

The epicenter of the 1811–12 New Madrid earthquakes was near this area, causing the Mississippi River to flow backwards in some places. Though the series of quakes changed the area geologically and affected the small number of inhabitants of the area at the time, the Kentucky Bend is the result of a surveying error, not the New Madrid earthquake.

=== Regions ===
Kentucky's regions (click on image for color-coding information; contrary to the map, regions do not follow county lines and the Western Coal Field is not as extensive as indicated. The outer part of it is the Clifty Area, which contains no coal but has bituminous sandstone.)

Kentucky can be divided into five primary regions: the Cumberland Plateau in the east, which is wholly underlain by coal and constitutes the Eastern Coal Field; the north-central Bluegrass region, where the major cities and the capital are located; the south-central and western Pennyroyal Plateau (a Mississippian-age plateau that is divided into eastern, central and western sub-regions, the latter known as the Pennyrile); the Western Coal Field; and the far-western Jackson Purchase, the northernmost extension of the Mississippian Embayment, west and south of the Tennessee River.

The Bluegrass region is commonly divided into two regions, the Inner Bluegrass encircling 90 miles (140 km) around Lexington, and the Outer Bluegrass that contains most of the northern portion of the state, above the Knobs. Much of the outer Bluegrass is in the Eden Shale Hills sub-region, made up of short, steep, and very narrow hills. The alluvial plain of the Ohio River is another geological region, as is the area south and east of Pine Mountain, part of the Ridge and Valley Belt of Appalachia.

=== Climate ===
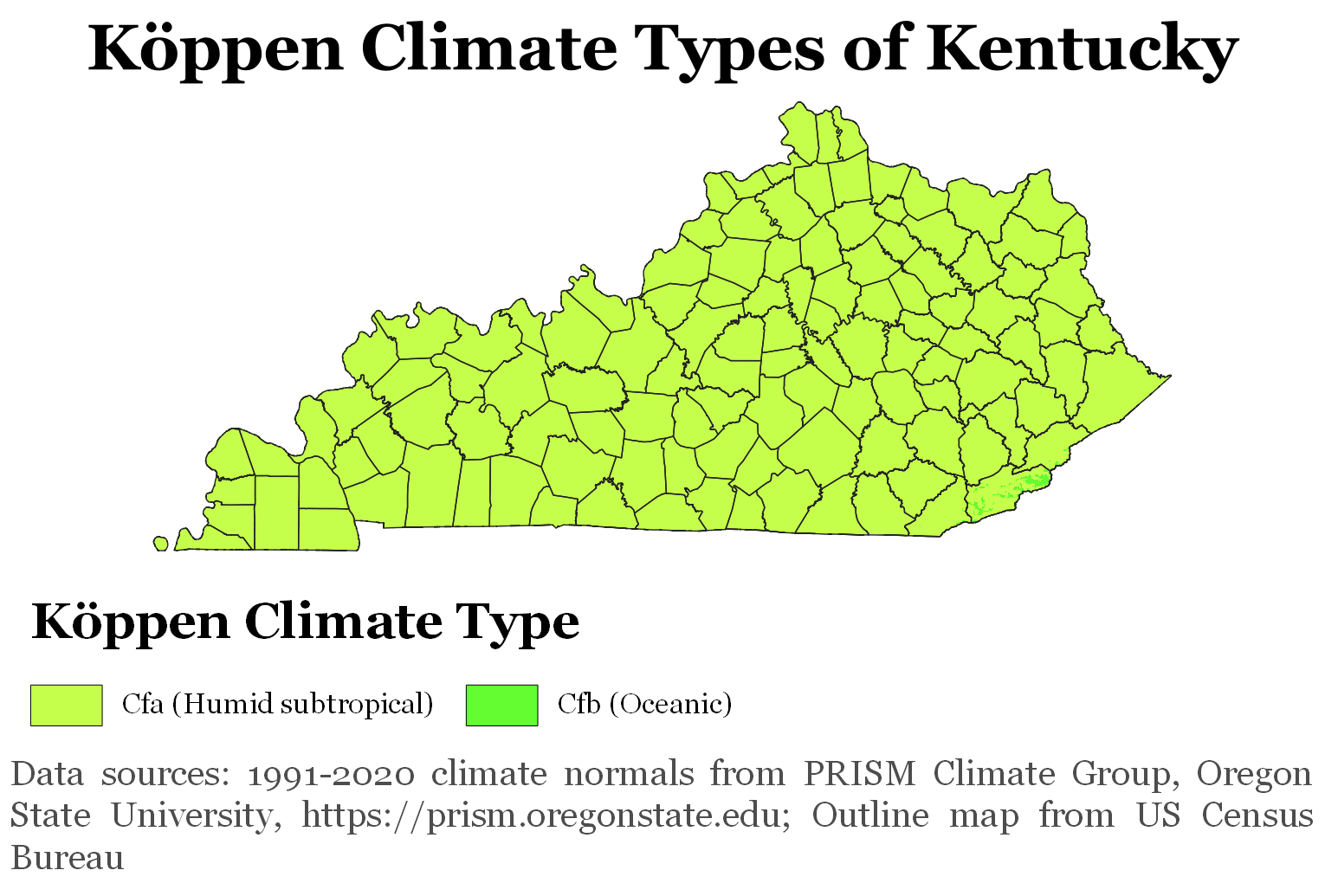
Köppen climate types of Kentucky, using 1991–2020 climate normals.

Most of Kentucky has a humid subtropical climate (Köppen: Cfa), with small Appalachian highland areas of the southeast of the state having an oceanic climate (Cfb). Temperatures in Kentucky usually range from daytime summer highs of 87 °F (31 °C) to the winter low of 23 °F (−5 °C). The average precipitation is 46 inches (1,200 mm) a year. Kentucky has four distinct seasons, with substantial variations in the severity of summer and winter. The state's highest recorded temperature was 114 °F (46 °C) in Greensburg on July 28, 1930, while its lowest recorded temperature was −37 °F (−38 °C) in Shelbyville on January 19, 1994. The state seldom experiences the extreme cold of far northern states or the high heat of the states in the Deep South; temperatures rarely drop below zero degrees Fahrenheit or rise above 100 degrees. Rain and snowfall averages about 45 inches per year.

The climate varies markedly within the state. The northern parts tend to be about five degrees cooler than those in the western parts of the state. Somerset in the south-central part receives ten more inches of rain per year than Covington to the north. Average temperatures for the entire state range from the low 30s in January to the high 80s in mid-July. The annual average temperature varies from 55 to 60 °F (13 to 16 °C): of 55 °F (13 °C) in the far north as an average annual temperature and of 60 °F (16 °C) in the extreme southwest.

In general, Kentucky has relatively hot, humid, rainy summers, and moderately cold and rainy winters. Mean maximum temperatures in July vary from 83 to 90 °F (28 to 32 °C); the mean minimum July temperatures are 61 to 69 °F (16 to 21 °C). In January the mean maximum temperatures range from 36 to 44 °F (2 to 7 °C); the mean minimum temperatures range from 19 to 26 °F (−7 to −3 °C). Temperature means vary with northern and far-eastern mountain regions averaging five degrees cooler year-round, compared to the relatively warmer areas of the southern and western regions of the state. Precipitation varies north to south with the north averaging of 38 to 40 inches (970 to 1,020 mm), and the south averaging of 50 inches (1,300 mm). Days per year below the freezing point vary from about sixty days in the southwest to more than a hundred days in the far-north and far-east.

Monthly average high and low temperatures for various Kentucky cities ( °F)
City	Jan	Feb	Mar	Apr	May	Jun	Jul	Aug	Sep	Oct	Nov	Dec
Lexington	40.9/24.8	45.5/27.9	55.3/35.4	65.7/44.7	74.3/54.2	82.8/62.7	86.1/66.5	85.6/65.2	78.8/57.6	67.5/46.6	55.4/37.2	43.9/28
Louisville	43/26.8	47.8/29.9	57.9/37.8	68.8/47.3	77.1/57	85.3/66	88.7/69.9	88.3/68.5	81.5/60.5	70.1/48.9	57.9/39.5	45.8/30
Owensboro	41.2/23.2	46.6/26.8	58.3/36.7	69.3/45.9	78.1/54.5	86.4/62.8	89.2/66.6	88.2/64.4	82.4/58.3	71.6/45.7	58.1/37.4	45.9/28.2
Paducah	43.4/25.8	48.9/29.5	59/37.7	69.4/46.6	78/56.3	86.2/64.9	89.3/68.5	89/66.1	82.1/57.8	71/46.7	58.4/37.9	46.3/28.6
Pikeville	44/23	50/25	60/32	69/39	77/49	84/58	87/63	86/62	80/56	71/42	60/33	49/26
Ashland	42/19	47/21	57/29	68/37	77/47	84/56	88/61	87/59	80/52	69/40	57/31	46/23
Bowling Green	45/26.4	50/29.6	59.8/37	69.7/45.6	77.8/55	86.1/63.9	89.4/67.9	88.9/66.1	82.1/58	71.2/46.3	59.4/37.5	47.9/29.2

==== Natural disasters ====
Deadliest weather events in Kentucky history	Date	Death toll	Affected regions
March 1890 middle Mississippi Valley tornado outbreak	March 27, 1890	200+	Louisville, W KY
Gradyville flood	June 7, 1907	20	Gradyville
May–June 1917 tornado outbreak sequence	May 27, 1917	66	Fulton area
Early-May 1933 tornado outbreak sequence	May 9, 1933, Tornado	38	South Central KY
Ohio River flood of 1937	Early 1937	unknown	Statewide
April 3, 1974, tornado outbreak	April 3, 1974	72	Statewide
March 1, 1997, Flooding	Early March 1997	18	Statewide
Tornado outbreak sequence of May 2004	May 30, 2004	0	Jefferson County, KY
December 21–24, 2004 North American winter storm	December 21–24, 2004	unknown	Statewide
Widespread Flash Flooding	September 22–23, 2006	6	Statewide
January 2009 North American ice storm	January 26–28, 2009	35	Statewide
2009 Kentuckiana Flash Flood	August 4, 2009	36	Kentuckiana
Tornado outbreak of March 2–3, 2012	March 2, 2012	22	Statewide
Tornado outbreak of December 10–11, 2021	December 10–11, 2021	74	Kentucky, 5 other states
July–August 2022 United States floods	July 24 – August 2, 2022	37	Kentucky, 5 other states
Tornado outbreak sequence of May 15–16, 2025	May 15–16, 2025	19	Kentucky, 6 other states

=== Lakes and rivers ===
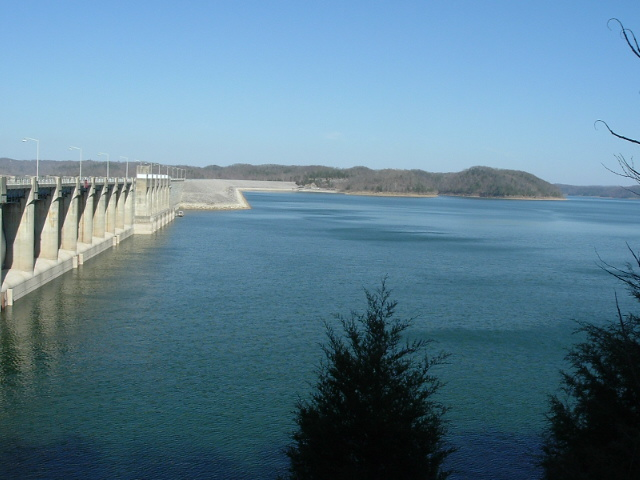
Lake Cumberland is the largest artificial American lake east of the Mississippi River by volume.

Kentucky is the only state to have a continuous border of rivers running along three of its sides – the Mississippi River to the west, the Ohio River to the north, and the Big Sandy River and Tug Fork to the east. Its major internal rivers include the Kentucky River, Tennessee River, Cumberland River, Green River, and Licking River.

Though it has only three major natural lakes, Kentucky is home to many artificial lakes. It has the largest artificial lakes east of the Mississippi in both water volume (Lake Cumberland) and surface area (Kentucky Lake). Kentucky Lake's 2,064 miles (3,322 km) of shoreline, 160,300 acres (64,900 hectares) of water surface, and 4,008,000 acre-feet (4.9 billion cubic meters) of flood storage are the most of any lake in the Tennessee Valley Authority system.

Kentucky's 90,000 miles (140,000 km) of streams provides one of the most expansive and complex stream systems in the nation.

=== Natural environment and conservation ===
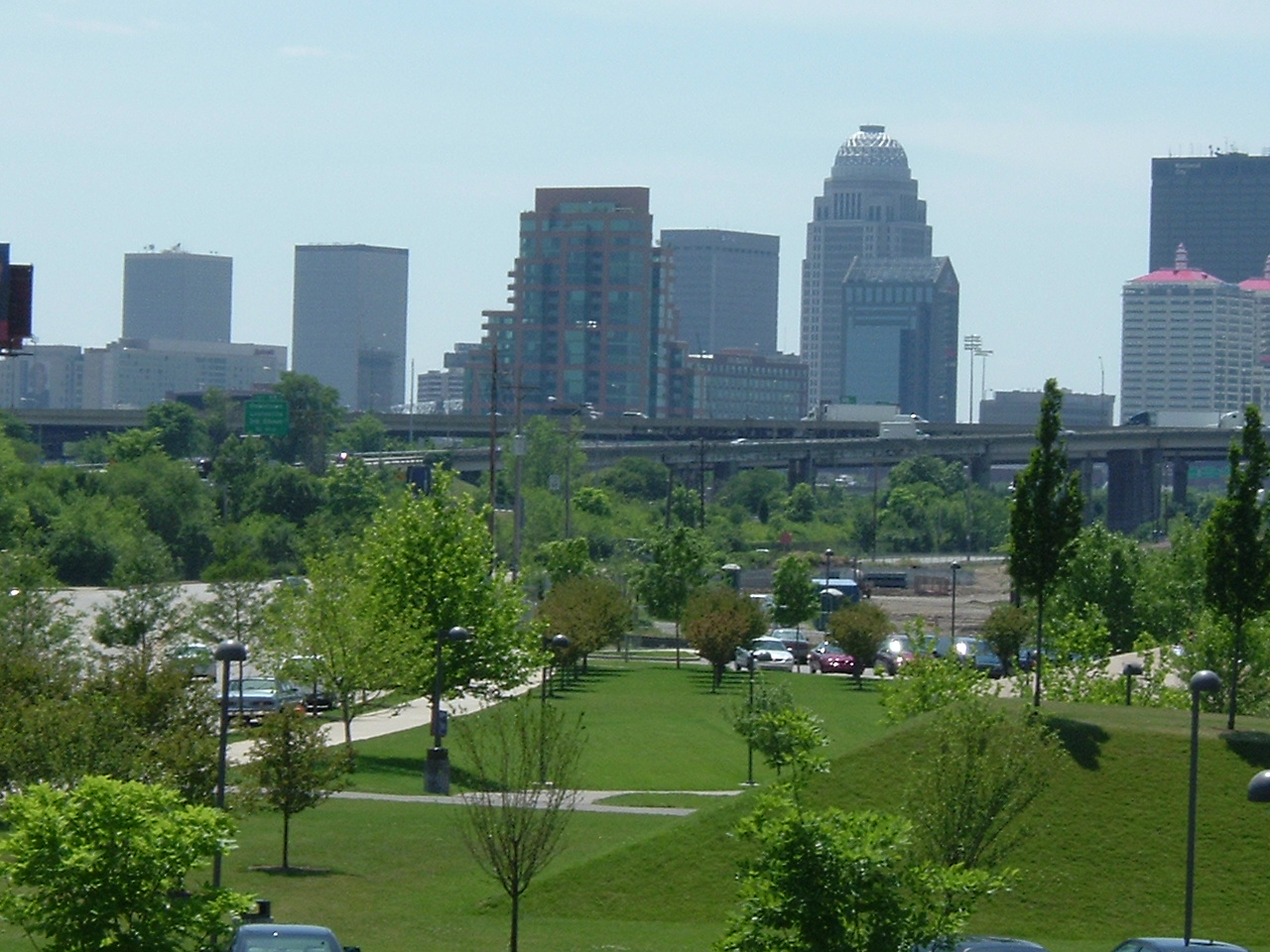
Once an industrial area, Louisville's waterfront has thousands of trees and miles of walking trails.

Kentucky hosts multiple habitats with a high number of endemic species, including some of the most extensive cave systems in the world. 102 known species are endemic to the state. The Bluegrass region, which is believed to have once been a lush open woodland environment similar to oak savanna with abundant thickets of river cane, a species of bamboo, was once described by E. Lucy Braun as having the most "anomalous" plant life of the whole Eastern United States. Kentucky's natural environment has suffered greatly from destructive human activities that began after European colonization, particularly the conversion of natural habitat to farmland and coal mining.

Kentucky has an expansive park system, which includes one national park, two National Recreation Areas, two National Historic Parks, two national forests, two National Wildlife Refuges, 45 state parks, 37,896 acres (153 km^{2}) of state forest, and 82 wildlife management areas.

Kentucky has been part of two of the most successful wildlife reintroduction projects in United States history. In the winter of 1997, the Kentucky Department of Fish and Wildlife Resources began to re-stock elk in the state's eastern counties, which had been extirpated from the area for over 150 years. As of 2009, the herd had reached the project goal of 10,000 animals, making it the largest herd east of the Mississippi River.

The state stocked wild turkeys in the 1950s, after reportedly having fewer than 900. Once nearly extinct, wild turkeys thrive throughout Kentucky. Hunters reported a record 29,006 birds taken during the 23-day season in spring 2009.

In 1991 the Land Between the Lakes partnered with the U.S. Fish and Wildlife Service for the Red Wolf Recovery Program, a captive breeding program.

=== Natural attractions ===
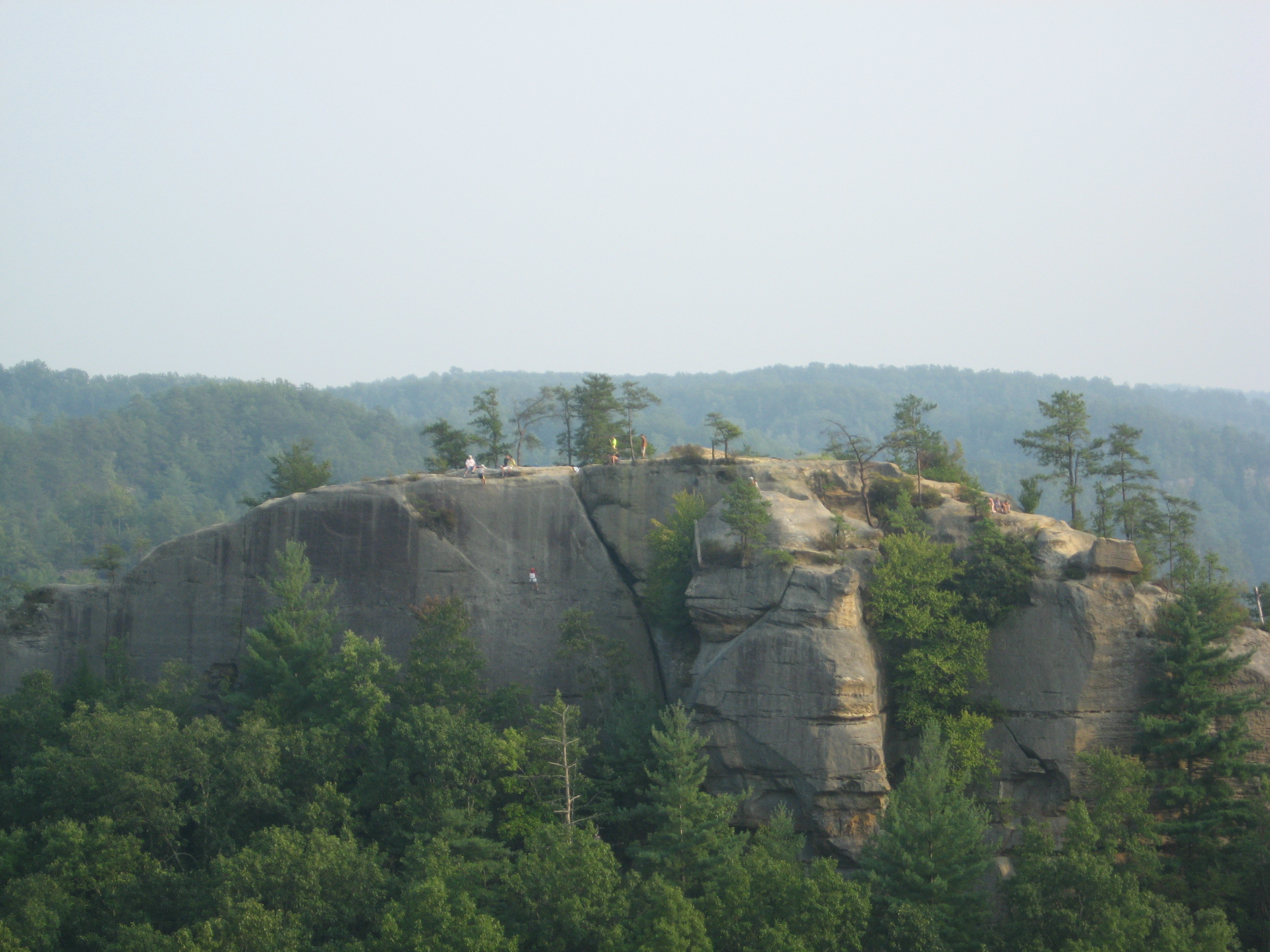
Red River Gorge is one of Kentucky's most visited places.

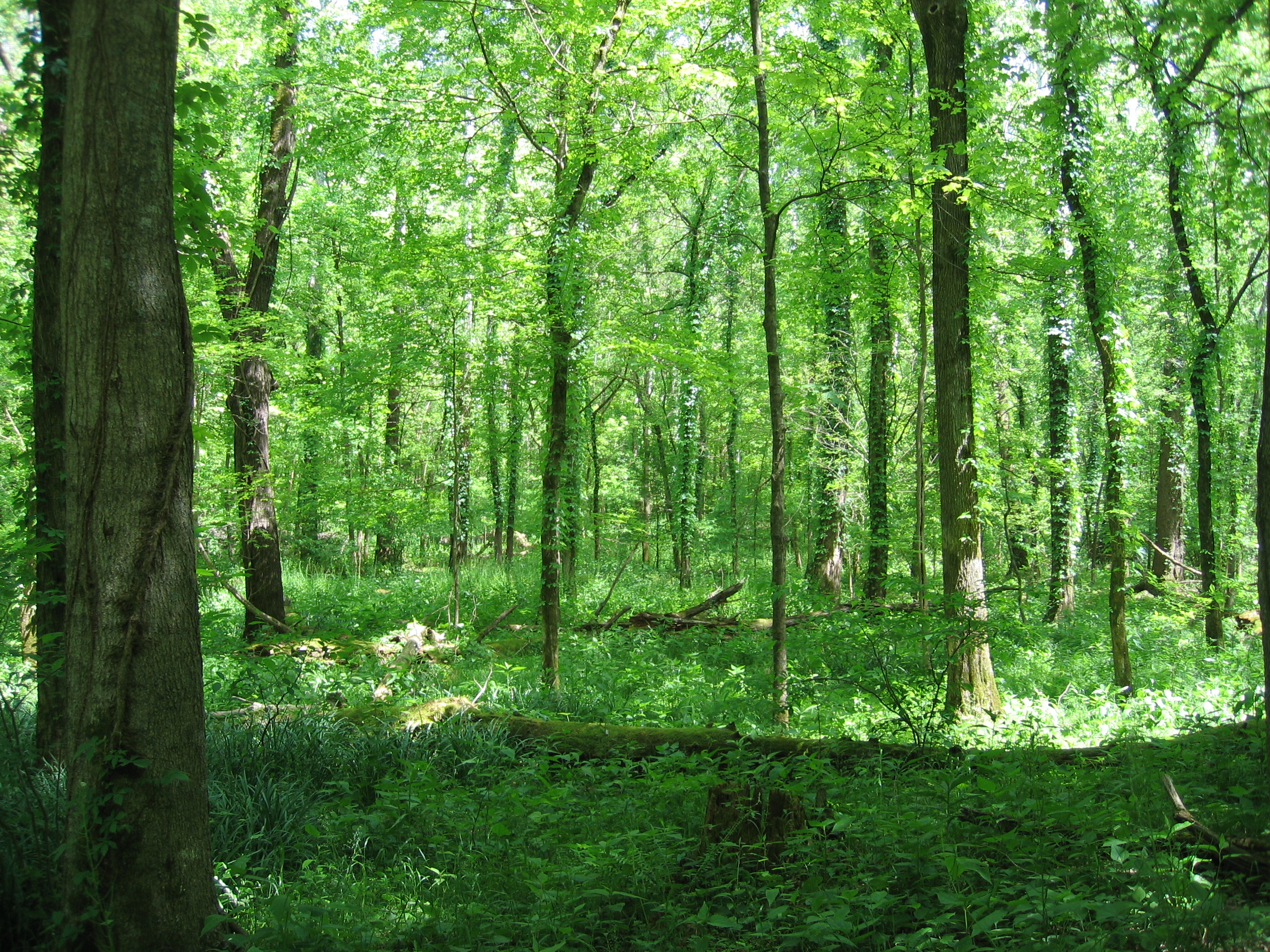
Forest at Otter Creek Outdoor Recreation Area, Meade County, Kentucky

- Cumberland Gap, chief passageway through the Appalachian Mountains in early American history.
- Cumberland Falls, the only place in the Western Hemisphere where a "moonbow" may be regularly seen, due to the spray of the falls.
- Mammoth Cave National Park, featuring the world's longest known cave system.
- Red River Gorge Geological Area, part of the Daniel Boone National Forest.
- Land Between the Lakes, a National Recreation Area managed by the United States Forest Service.
- Big South Fork National River and Recreation Area near Whitley City.
- Black Mountain, state's highest point of elevation. Runs along the south ridge of Pine Mountain in Letcher County, Kentucky. The highest point located in Harlan County.
- Bad Branch Falls State Nature Preserve, 2,639-acre (11 km^{2}) state nature preserve on southern slope of Pine Mountain in Letcher County. Includes one of the largest concentrations of rare and endangered species in the state, as well as a 60-foot (18 m) waterfall and a Kentucky Wild River.
- Jefferson Memorial Forest, located in the southern fringes of Louisville in the Knobs region, the largest municipally run forest in the United States.
- Lake Cumberland, 1,255 miles (2,020 km) of shoreline located in South Central Kentucky.
- Natural Bridge, located in Slade, Kentucky Powell County.
- Breaks Interstate Park, located in southeastern Pike County, Kentucky and Southwestern Virginia. The Breaks is commonly known as the "Grand Canyon of the South".
- Blanton Forest, located in Harlan County, the state's largest old-growth forest and one of only 13 remaining large tracts of old-growth forest in the eastern USA.

== Administrative divisions ==
=== Counties ===
Kentucky is subdivided into 120 counties, the largest being Pike County at 787.6 square miles (2,040 km^{2}), and the most populous being Jefferson County (which coincides with the Louisville Metro governmental area) with 772,144 residents as of 2023.

County government, under the Kentucky Constitution of 1891, is vested in the County Judge/Executive, (formerly called the County Judge) who serves as the executive head of the county, and a legislature called a Fiscal Court. Despite the unusual name, the Fiscal Court no longer has judicial functions.

=== Consolidated city-county governments ===
Kentucky's two most populous counties, Jefferson and Fayette, have their governments consolidated with the governments of their largest cities. Louisville-Jefferson County Government (Louisville Metro) and Lexington-Fayette Urban County Government (Lexington Metro) are unique in that their city councils and county Fiscal Court structures have been merged into a single entity with a single chief executive, the Metro Mayor and Urban County Mayor, respectively. Although the counties still exist as subdivisions of the state, in reference the names Louisville and Lexington are used to refer to the entire area coextensive with the former cities and counties.

=== Major cities ===
Largest cities or towns in Kentucky Source:
Rank	Name	County	Pop.	Rank	Name	County	Pop.
1	Louisville	Jefferson	633,045	11	Nicholasville	Jessamine	31,093
2	Lexington	Fayette	322,570	12	Independence	Kenton	28,676
3	Bowling Green	Warren	72,294	13	Frankfort	Franklin	28,602
4	Owensboro	Daviess	60,183	14	Jeffersontown	Jefferson	28,474
5	Covington	Kenton	40,961	15	Henderson	Henderson	27,981
6	Georgetown	Scott	37,086	16	Paducah	McCracken	27,137
7	Richmond	Madison	34,585	17	Radcliff	Hardin	23,042
8	Florence	Boone	31,946	18	Ashland	Boyd	21,625
9	Elizabethtown	Hardin	31,394	19	Erlanger	Kenton	19,611
10	Hopkinsville	Christian	31,180	20	Madisonville	Hopkins	19,542

The Metro Louisville government area has a 2018 population of 1,298,990. Under United States Census Bureau methodology, the population of Louisville was 623,867. The latter figure is the population of the so-called "balance" – the parts of Jefferson County that were either unincorporated or within the City of Louisville before the formation of the merged government in 2003. In 2018 the Louisville Combined Statistical Area (CSA) had a population of 1,569,112; including 1,209,191 in Kentucky, which means more than 25% of the state's population now lives in the Louisville CSA. Since 2000, over one-third of the state's population growth has occurred in the Louisville CSA. In addition, the top 28 wealthiest places in Kentucky are in Jefferson County and seven of the 15 wealthiest counties in the state are located in the Louisville CSA.

The state's second-largest city is Lexington with a 2018 census population of 323,780, its metro had a population of 516,697, and its CSA, which includes the Frankfort and Richmond statistical areas, having a population of 746,310. The Northern Kentucky area, which comprises the seven Kentucky counties in the Cincinnati/Northern Kentucky metropolitan area, had a population of 447,457 in 2018. The metropolitan areas of Louisville, Lexington, and Northern Kentucky have a combined population of 2,402,958 as of 2018, which is 54% of the state's total population on only about 19% of the state's land. This area is often referred to as the Golden triangle as it contains a majority of the state's wealth, population, population growth, and economic growth, it is where most of the state's largest cities by population are located. It is referred to as the Golden triangle as the metro areas of Lexington, Louisville, and Northern Kentucky/Cincinnati outline a triangle shape. Interstates I-71, I-75, and I-64 form the triangle shape. Additionally, all counties in Kentucky that are part of an MSA or CSA have a total population of 2,970,694, which is 67% of the state's population.

As of 2017 Bowling Green had a population of 67,067, making it the third most populous city in the state. The Bowling Green metropolitan area had an estimated population of 174,835; and the combined statistical area it shares with Glasgow has an estimated population of 228,743.

The two other fast-growing urban areas in Kentucky are the Bowling Green area and the "Tri-Cities Region" of southeastern Kentucky, comprising Somerset, London and Corbin.

Although only one town in the "Tri-Cities" (Somerset) currently has more than 12,000 people, the area has been experiencing heightened population and job growth since the 1990s. Growth has been especially rapid in Laurel County, which outgrew areas such as Scott and Jessamine counties around Lexington or Shelby and Nelson Counties around Louisville. London significantly grew in population in the 2000s, from 5,692 in 2000 to 7,993 in 2010. London landed a Wal-Mart distribution center in 1997, bringing thousands of jobs to the community.

In northeast Kentucky, the greater Ashland area is an important transportation, manufacturing, and medical center. Iron and petroleum production, as well as the transport of coal by rail and barge, have been historical pillars of the region's economy. Due to a decline in the area's industrial base, Ashland has seen a sizable reduction in its population since 1990; however, the population of the area has since stabilized with the medical service industry taking a greater role in the local economy. The Ashland area, including the counties of Boyd and Greenup, is part of the Huntington-Ashland, WV-KY-OH, Metropolitan Statistical Area (MSA). As of the 2000 census, the MSA had a population of 288,649. More than 21,000 of those people (as of 2010) reside within the city limits of Ashland.

The largest county in Kentucky by area is Pike, which contains Pikeville and suburb Coal Run Village. The county and surrounding area is the most populated region in the state that is not part of a Micropolitan Statistical Area or a Metropolitan Statistical Area containing nearly 200,000 people in five counties: Floyd County, Martin County, Letcher County, and neighboring Mingo County, West Virginia. Pike County contains slightly more than 68,000 people.

Only three U.S. states have capitals with smaller populations than Kentucky's Frankfort (pop. 25,527): Augusta, Maine (pop. 18,560), Pierre, South Dakota (pop. 13,876), and Montpelier, Vermont (pop. 8,035).

== Demographics ==
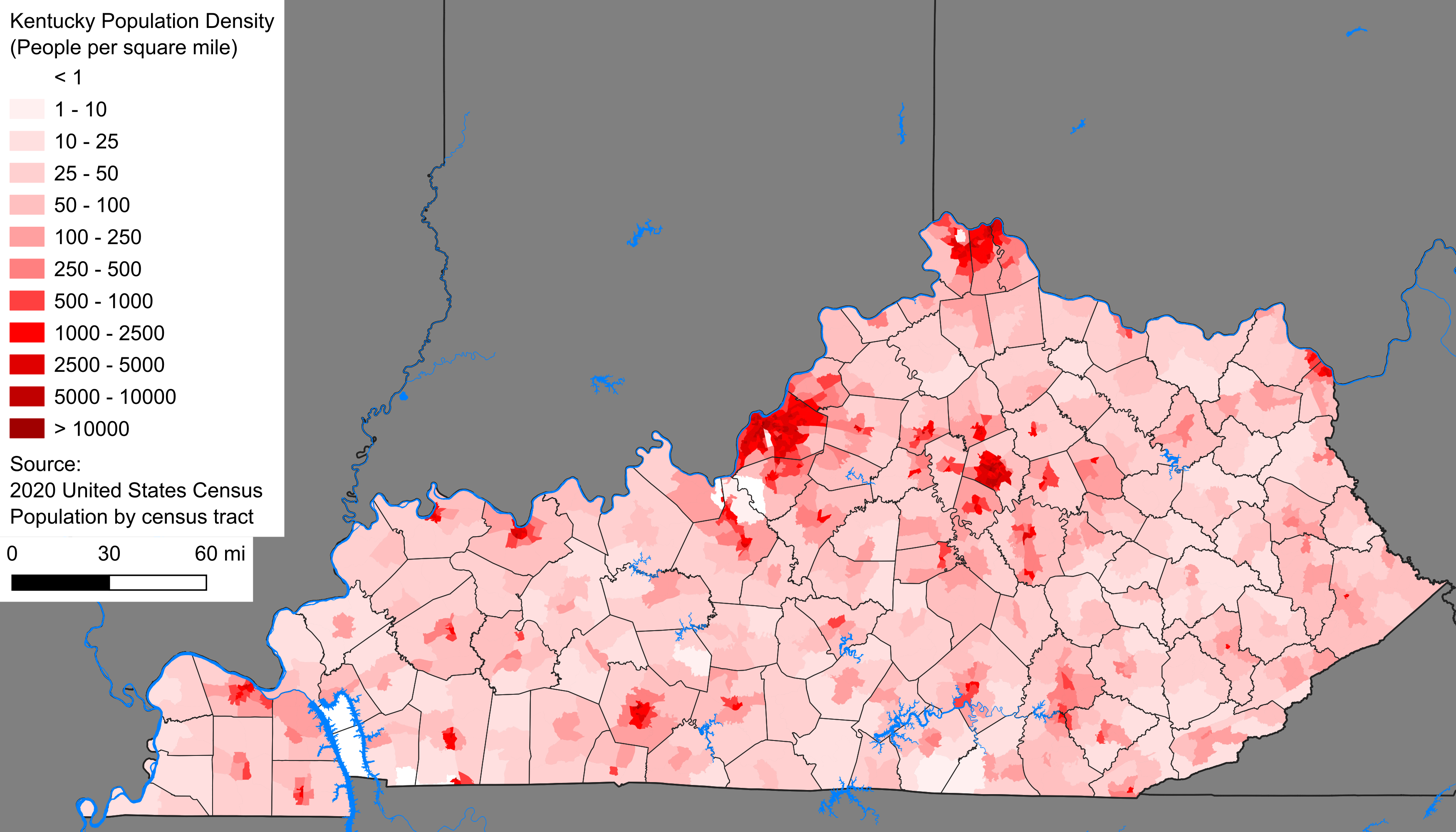
Kentucky population density map

Historical population
Census	Pop.	Note	%±
1790	73,677		—
1800	220,955		199.9%
1810	406,511		84.0%
1820	564,317		38.8%
1830	687,917		21.9%
1840	779,828		13.4%
1850	982,405		26.0%
1860	1,155,684		17.6%
1870	1,321,011		14.3%
1880	1,648,690		24.8%
1890	1,858,635		12.7%
1900	2,147,174		15.5%
1910	2,289,905		6.6%
1920	2,416,630		5.5%
1930	2,614,589		8.2%
1940	2,845,627		8.8%
1950	2,944,806		3.5%
1960	3,038,156		3.2%
1970	3,218,706		5.9%
1980	3,660,777		13.7%
1990	3,685,295		0.7%
2000	4,041,770		9.7%
2010	4,339,367		7.4%
2020	4,505,836		3.8%
2025 (est.)	4,606,864		2.2%
Sources: 1790–2000; 1910–2020

The United States Census Bureau determined that the population of Kentucky was 4,505,836 in 2020, increasing since the 2010 United States census.

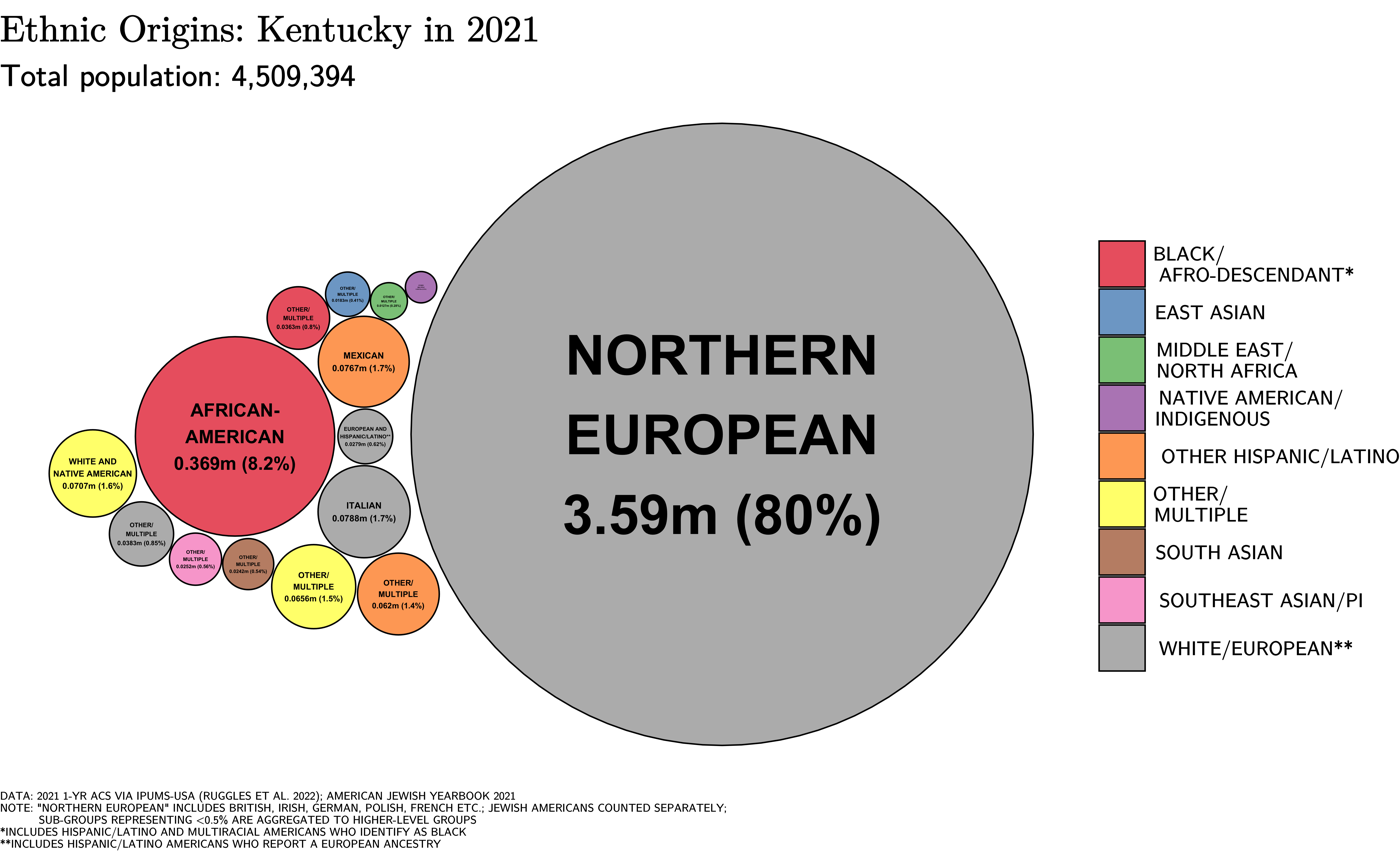
Ethnic origins in Kentucky

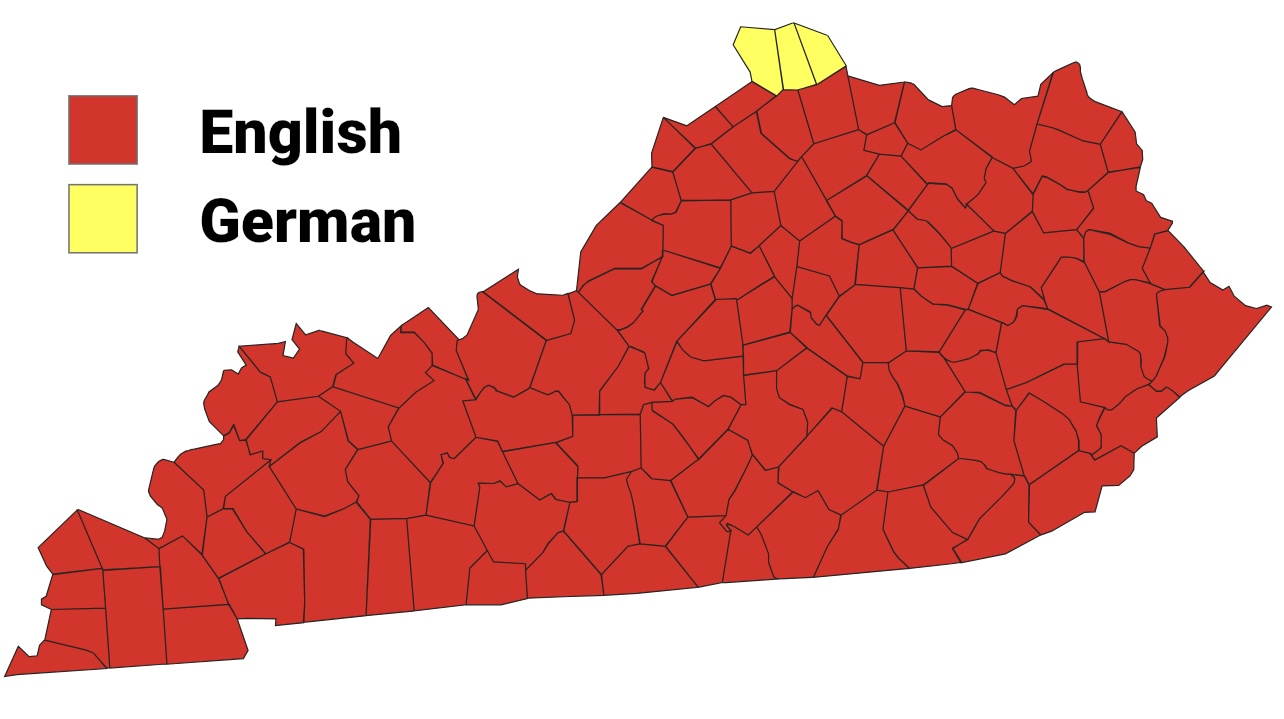
Largest alone or in any combination ethnic origin by county in Kentucky, per the 2020 census

Racial plurality in Kentucky by county, per the 2020 U.S. census Legend: Non-Hispanic White 60–70% 70–80% 80–90% 90%+

As of July 1, 2016, Kentucky had an estimated population of 4,436,974, which is an increase of 12,363 from the prior year and an increase of 97,607, or 2.2%, since the year 2010. This includes a natural increase since the last census of 73,541 people (that is 346,968 births minus 273,427 deaths) and an increase due to net migration of 26,135 people into the state. Immigration from outside the United States resulted in a net increase of 40,051 people, and migration within the country produced a net decrease of 13,916 people. As of 2015, Kentucky's population included about 149,016 foreign-born persons (3.4%). In 2016 the population density of the state was 110 people per square mile (42 people/km^{2}). Mexico, India, Cuba, China, and Guatemala are the top five countries of origin for Kentucky's immigrants.

Kentucky's population has grown every decade since records began, though during most decades of the 20th century there was net out-migration from the state. Since 1900, rural Kentucky counties have suffered a net loss of more than a million people to migration, while urban areas have experienced a slight net gain.

Kentucky's center of population is in Washington County, in the city of Willisburg.

According to HUD's 2022 Annual Homeless Assessment Report, there were an estimated 3,984 homeless people in Kentucky.

Life expectancy in Kentucky was 72.5 years in 2021.

=== Race and ancestry ===
Ethnic composition as of the 2020 census
Race and ethnicity	Alone	Total
White (non-Hispanic)	81.3%	85.0%
African American (non-Hispanic)	7.9%	9.4%
Hispanic or Latino (Note: Persons of Hispanic or Latino origin are not distinguished between total and partial ancestry.)	—	4.6%
Asian	1.6%	2.1%
Native American	0.2%	1.8%
Pacific Islander	0.1%	0.2%
Other	0.3%	0.9%

Historical racial demographics
Racial composition	1990	2000		
White	92.0%	90.1%	87.8%	82.4%
Black	7.1%	7.3%	7.8%	8.0%
Asian	0.5%	0.7%	1.1%	1.7%
Native American and Alaska Native	0.2%	0.2%	0.2%	0.3%
Native Hawaiian and other Pacific Islander	–	–	0.1%	0.1%
Other race	0.2%	0.6%	1.3%	2.1%
Two or more races	–	1.0%	1.7%	5.4%

Kentucky – Racial and ethnic composition Note: the US Census treats Hispanic/Latino as an ethnic category. This table excludes Latinos from the racial categories and assigns them to a separate category. Hispanics/Latinos may be of any race.
Race / Ethnicity (NH = Non-Hispanic)	Pop 2000	Pop 2010	Pop 2020	% 2000	% 2010	% 2020
White alone (NH)	3,608,013	3,745,655	3,664,764	89.27%	86.32%	81.33%
Black or African American alone (NH)	293,639	333,075	357,764	7.27%	7.68%	7.94%
Native American or Alaska Native alone (NH)	7,939	8,642	8,080	0.20%	0.20%	0.18%
Asian alone (NH)	29,368	48,338	73,843	0.73%	1.11%	1.64%
Pacific Islander alone (NH)	1,275	2,074	3,462	0.03%	0.05%	0.08%
Other race alone (NH)	3,846	4,634	14,706	0.10%	0.11%	0.33%
Mixed race or Multiracial (NH)	37,750	64,113	175,363	0.93%	1.48%	3.89%
Hispanic or Latino (any race)	59,939	132,836	207,854	1.48%	3.06%	4.61%
Total	4,041,769	4,339,367	4,505,836	100.00%	100.00%	100.00%

According to U.S. Census Bureau official statistics, the state's largest ancestry in 2013 was American, totalling 20.2%. In 1980, before the status of ethnic American was an available option on the official census, the largest claimed ancestries in the commonwealth were English (49.6%), Irish (26.3%), and German (24.2%). In the urban counties of Jefferson, Oldham, Fayette, Boone, Kenton, and Campbell, German is the largest reported ancestry. Americans of Scotch-Irish and English ancestry are present throughout the entire state. Many residents claim Irish ancestry on account of Scotch-Irish (Ulster Scots) descent. In the 1980s, the only counties in the United States where over half of the population cited "English" as their only ancestry group were in eastern Kentucky.

In the 2000 census, some 20,000 people (0.49%) in the state self-identified as Native American. The state has no federally recognized tribes or state-recognized tribes.

African Americans, who before the Civil War were mostly slaves, made up 25% of Kentucky's population around that time; they were held and worked primarily in the central Bluegrass region, an area of hemp and tobacco cultivation as well as the raising of blooded livestock. The number of African Americans living in Kentucky declined during the 20th century amid the Great Migration. In the 2020 Census, 362,417 Kentucky residents were identified as African American (8% of the total 4,505,836). The state's African-American population is highly urbanized, with 44.2% living in Jefferson County and 52% living in the broader Louisville metropolitan area. Other areas with high concentrations include Christian and Fulton counties and the cities of Paducah and Lexington. African Americans in the seven counties of Jefferson (168,910), Fayette (48,076), Christian (15,527), Warren (12,933), Hardin (12,825), Kenton (8,195), and McCracken (7,598) make up more than 75% of all African Americans in the state.

The Hispanic and Asian populations in Kentucky are small but have grown significantly since the late 20th century. Most of Kentucky's Hispanic residents are of Mexican ancestry, while most of Kentucky's Asian residents are of Chinese and Indian heritage. There is also a Vietnamese community in Lexington and Louisville, and Vietnamese, Cambodian, and Lao populations in Bowling Green.

=== Language ===
In 2000, 96% of all residents of the state five years old and older spoke only English at home, a small decrease from 98% in 1990. Speech patterns in the state generally reflect the first settlers' Virginia backgrounds. South Midland features are best preserved in the mountains, with Southern in most other areas of Kentucky, but some common to Midland and Southern are widespread. After a vowel, the /r/ may be weak or missing. For instance, Coop has the vowel of put, but the root rhymes with boot. In southern Kentucky, earthworms are called redworms, a burlap bag is known as a tow sack or the Southern grass sack, and green beans are called snap beans. In Kentucky English, a young man may carry, not escort, his girlfriend to a party.

Spanish is the second-most-spoken language in Kentucky, after English.

=== Religion ===
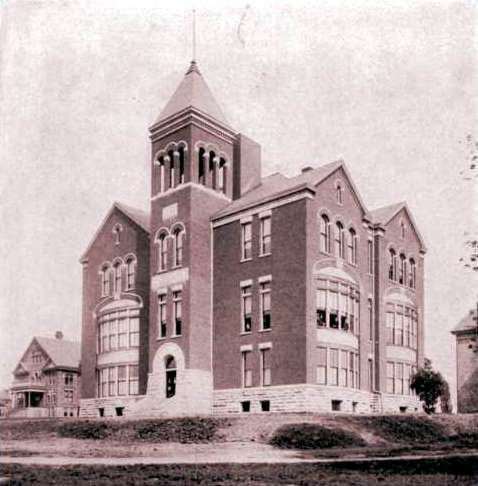
Lexington Theological Seminary (then College of the Bible), 1904

Religion in Kentucky (2014)
Religion	Percent
Protestant	65%
No religion	22%
Catholic	10%
Other faith	2%

As of 2010, the Association of Religion Data Archives (ARDA) reported the following groupings of Kentucky's 4,339,367 residents:

- 48% not affiliated with any religious group, 2,101,653 persons
- 42% Protestant Christian, 1,819,860 adherents
  - 33% Evangelical Protestant, 1,448,947 adherents (23% within the Southern Baptist Convention, 1,004,407 adherents)
  - 7.1% Mainline Protestant, 305,955 adherents (4.4% in the United Methodist Church, 189,596 adherents)
  - 1.5% Black Protestant, 64,958 adherents
- 8.3% Catholic, 359,783 adherents
- 0.74% Latter-day Saints, 31,991 adherents
- 0.60% other religions, 26,080 adherents (0.26% Muslim, 0.16% Jewish, 0.06% Buddhist, 0.01% other)

Being a Southern state in the Bible Belt, Kentucky is predominantly Christian and is home to several seminaries. Southern Baptist Theological Seminary in Louisville is the principal seminary for the Southern Baptist Convention. Louisville is the home of the Louisville Presbyterian Theological Seminary, an institution of the Presbyterian Church (USA). Lexington has one seminary, Lexington Theological Seminary (affiliated with the Disciples of Christ). The Baptist Seminary of Kentucky is located on the campus of Georgetown College in Georgetown. Asbury Theological Seminary, a multi-denominational seminary in the Methodist tradition, is located in nearby Wilmore.

In addition to seminaries, there are several colleges affiliated with denominations:

- In Louisville, Bellarmine University and Spalding University are affiliated with the Roman Catholic Church.
- In Lexington, Transylvania University is affiliated with the Disciples of Christ.
- In Owensboro, Kentucky Wesleyan College is associated with the United Methodist Church, and Brescia University is associated with the Roman Catholic Church.
- In Pikeville, the University of Pikeville is affiliated with the Presbyterian Church (USA).
- In Wilmore, Asbury University (a separate institution from the seminary) is associated with the Christian College Consortium.
- The Baptist denomination is associated with several colleges:
  - University of the Cumberlands, in Williamsburg
  - Campbellsville University, in Campbellsville
  - Georgetown College, in Georgetown
  - Clear Creek Baptist Bible College, in Pineville, Kentucky
- Grayson in Carter County is home to Kentucky Christian University which is affiliated with the Christian Churches and Churches of Christ.
- The Abbey of Our Lady of Gethsemani is located in Bardstown, Kentucky. Author Thomas Merton, known as a social activist, worked to reconcile Christianity with other major religions, had converted to Catholicism as a young man, and became a Trappist monk; he lived and worked here from 1941 until his death in 1968.

Louisville is home to the Cathedral of the Assumption, the third-oldest Catholic cathedral in continuous use in the United States. The city holds the headquarters of the Presbyterian Church (USA) and their printing press. Reflecting late 19th, 20th and 21st-century immigration from different countries, Louisville also has Jewish, Muslim, and Hindu communities.

In 1996 the Center for Interfaith Relations established the Festival of Faiths, the first and oldest annual interfaith festival to be held in the United States.

The Christian creationist apologetics group, Answers in Genesis, along with its Creation Museum, is headquartered in Petersburg, Kentucky.

== Economy ==
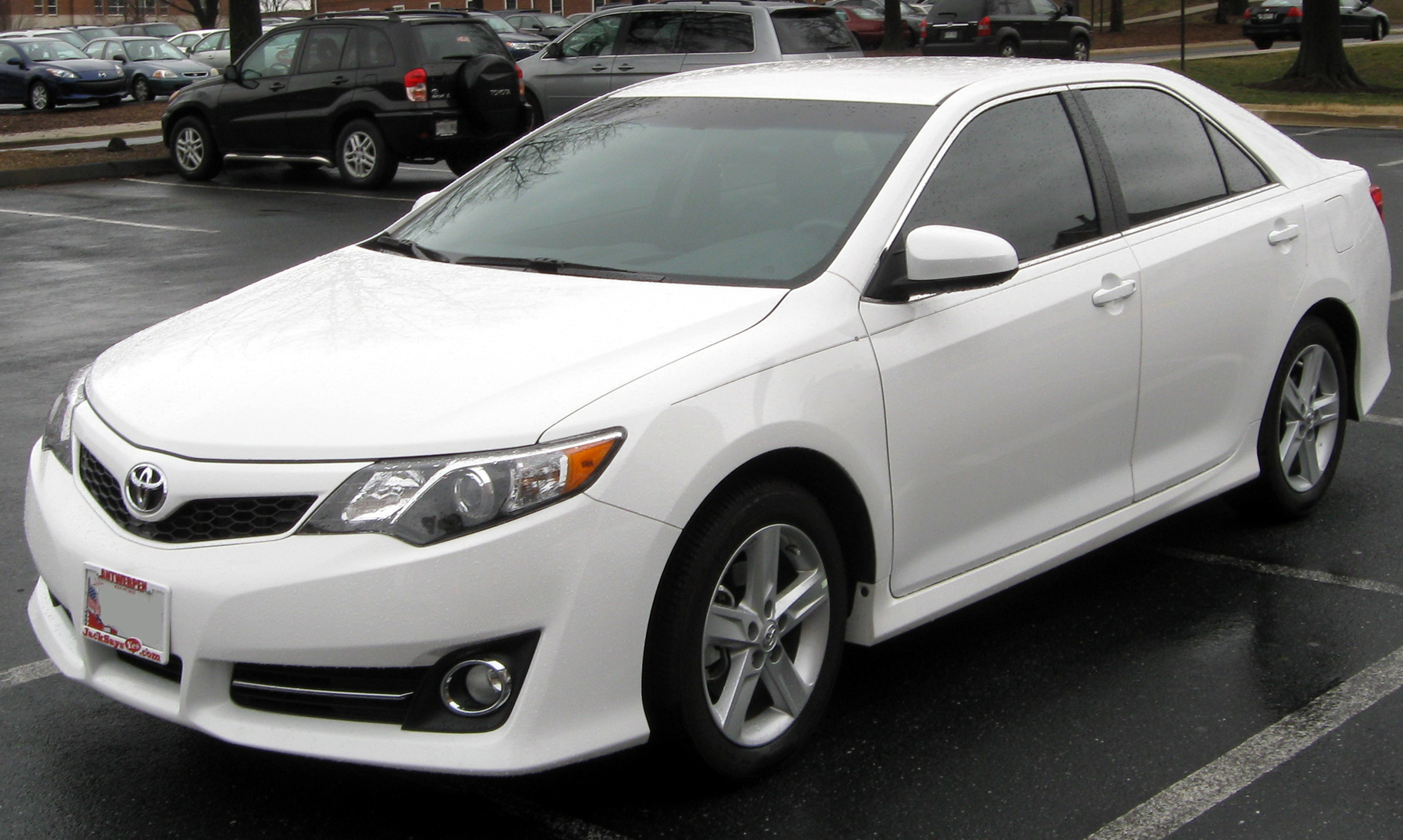
The best selling car in the United States, the Toyota Camry, is manufactured in Georgetown, Kentucky.

In 2025, Kentucky's total gross state product was $306.8 billion. In 2025, Kentucky's per capita personal income was $60,673. In 2025, small businesses made up 99.3% of all businesses in the state, and employed 42.6% of the Kentucky's workforce. As of May 2025, the state's unemployment rate was 5%.

Early in its history, Kentucky gained recognition for its excellent farming conditions. It was the site of the first commercial winery in the United States (started in present-day Jessamine County in 1799) and due to the high calcium content of the soil in the Bluegrass region quickly became a major horse breeding (and later racing) area.

In 2006, Kentucky ranked 5th nationally in goat farming, 8th in beef cattle production, and 14th in corn production. Kentucky has been a long-standing major center of the tobacco industry – both as a center of business and tobacco farming.

Kentucky's economy has expanded to in non-agricultural terms as well, especially auto manufacturing, energy fuel production, and medical facilities.

Kentucky ranked 4th among U.S. states in the number of automobiles and trucks assembled in 2003.

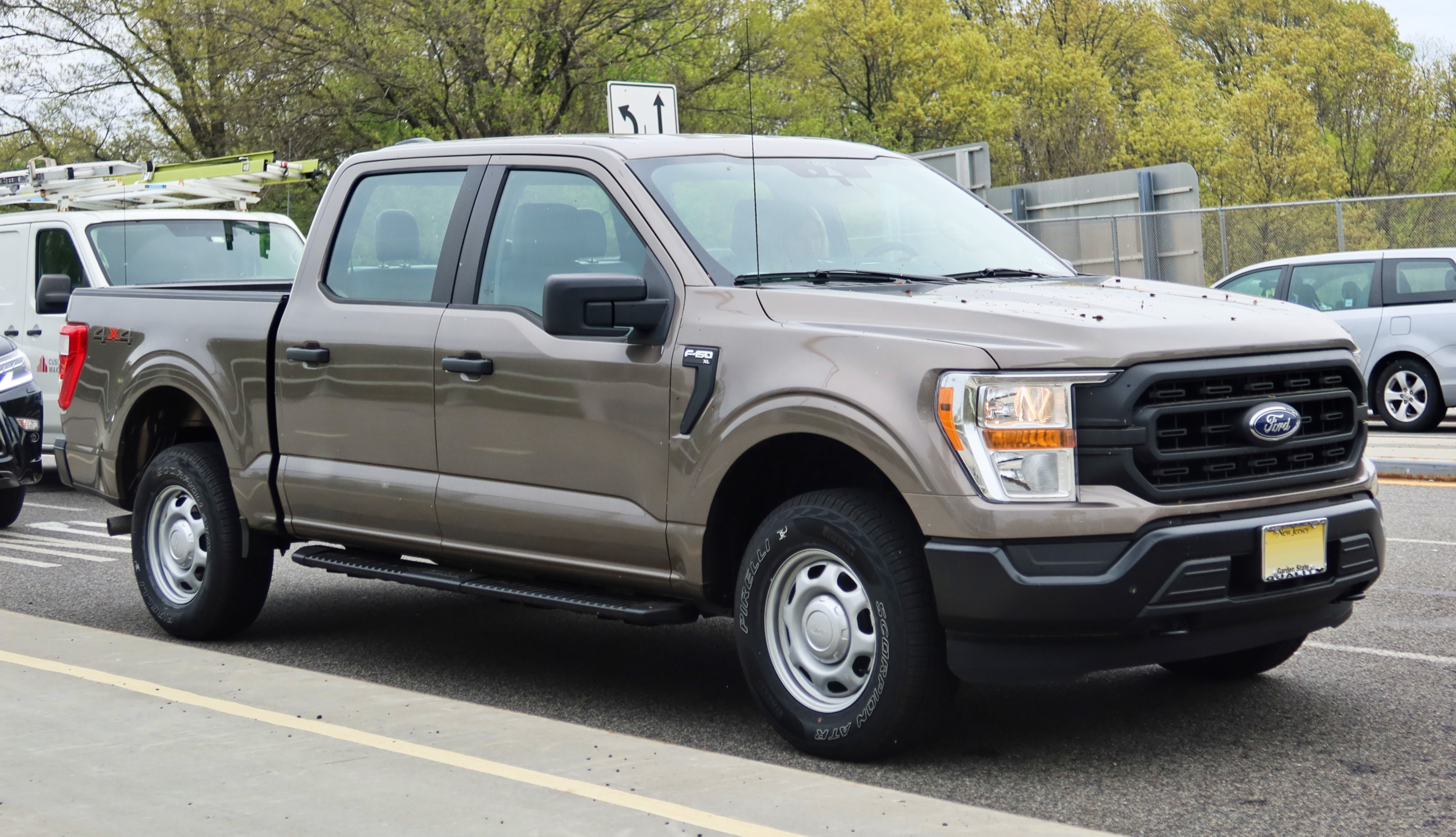
The best selling truck in the United States, the Ford F-Series, is manufactured in Louisville, Kentucky.

Kentucky has historically been a major coal producer, but the industry has been in decline since the 1980s, and the number employed dropped by more than half between 2011 and 2015.

As of 2010, 24% of electricity produced in the U.S. depended on either enriched uranium rods coming from the Paducah Gaseous Diffusion Plant (the only domestic site of low-grade uranium enrichment, which ceased operations in 2013), or from the 107,000 tons of coal extracted from the state's two coal fields (which combined produce 4% percent of the electricity in the US). In August 2025, General Matter, an American uranium enrichment company, signed a lease with the U.S. Department of Energy for the former Paducah Gaseous Diffusion Plant. Plans for the $1.5 billion updated facility include uranium enrichment technology for the production of fuel needed for the next generation of nuclear energy. In January 2026, General Matter received a $900 million contract from the U.S. Department of Energy for re-shoring to produce American enriched uranium.

Kentucky produces 95% of the world's supply of bourbon whiskey, and the number of barrels of bourbon being aged in Kentucky (more than 5.7 million) exceeds the state's population. Bourbon has been a growing market – with production of Kentucky bourbon rising 170 percent between 1999 and 2015. In 2019 the state had more than fifty distilleries for bourbon production.

Kentucky exports reached $22.1 billion in 2012, with products and services going to 199 countries.

Fort Knox, a United States Army post best known as the site of the United States Bullion Depository, which is used to house a large portion of the United States official gold reserves, is located in Kentucky between Louisville and Elizabethtown. In May 2010, the Army Human Resource Center of Excellence, the largest office building in the state consisting of six interconnected, three-story buildings, at nearly 900,000 square feet (84,000 m^{2}), opened at Fort Knox. The complex consolidated facilities from Virginia, Indiana and Missouri, and employs nearly 4,300 soldiers and civilians.

The new Louisville VA Medical Center, with a 34-acre campus, is scheduled for completion in late 2026, with its first patient in 2027. This nearly $1 billion, million-square-foot facility on Brownsboro Road features 104 beds and advanced modern state-of-the-art medical services. Replacing a 75-year-old facility, it will serve over 45,000 veterans in Kentucky and Southern Indiana. Hundreds of health care workers will be employed at the center.

Kentucky contains two of the twenty U.S. Federal Penitentiaries: USP Big Sandy (in the east in Martin County near Inez) and USP McCreary (in the south in McCreary County in the Daniel Boone National Forest).

Kentucky has become one of the fastest growing states for AI and cloud-computing data center developments, with roughly 30 large data center projects that are in various stages of discussion across Kentucky. Currently under development, the data center in Hawesville, Hancock County, has the potential to become a massive $14 billion development. However, there are many local communities that are grappling with environmental concerns, and the prospect of hyperscale data center projects, with massive, sprawling warehouses of power intensive computer clusters driving up their electricity demand. Kentucky currently has a data center tax break on the books, although the state has not awarded any of these exemptions yet. There is intense debate about their costs and benefits. In July 2026, the Department of Energy announced a new privately funded $100 billion AI data center campus in Paducah, to be developed by a consortium led by Brookfield Asset Management and NextEra Energy.

Since 2020, major economic announcements have accelerated throughout the state. Many major US and foreign corporations, including Raytheon, UPS, Amazon, ExxonMobil, Apple, Envision AESC, Canadian Solar, General Matter, General Motors, Ford, GE Appliances, Kingspan Group, Toyota, Foxconn, Kroger, and Beam Suntory, have expanded their presence.

=== Taxation ===
Tax is collected by the Kentucky Department of Revenue. Kentucky has a flat 4% individual income tax rate. The sales tax rate in Kentucky is 6%.

Kentucky has a broadly based classified property tax system. All classes of property, unless exempted by the Constitution, are taxed by the state, although at widely varying rates. Many of these classes are exempted from taxation by local government. Of the classes that are subject to local taxation, three have special rates set by the General Assembly, one by the Kentucky Supreme Court and the remaining classes are subject to the full local rate, which includes the tax rate set by the local taxing bodies plus all voted levies. Real property is assessed on 100% of the fair market value and property taxes are due by December 31. Once the primary source of state and local government revenue, property taxes now account for only about 6% of the Kentucky's annual General Fund revenues.

Until January 1, 2006, Kentucky imposed a tax on intangible personal property held by a taxpayer on January 1 of each year. The Kentucky intangible tax was repealed under House Bill 272. Intangible property consisted of any property or investment that represents evidence of value or the right to value. Some types of intangible property included: bonds, notes, retail repurchase agreements, accounts receivable, trusts, enforceable contracts sale of real estate (land contracts), money in hand, money in safe deposit boxes, annuities, interests in estates, loans to stockholders, and commercial paper.

In 2023, Kentucky launched a regulated local and online sports betting industry. Taxing sportsbooks at 9.75% (in person) and 14.25% (online), the first two months of action saw the state collect $7.94 million.

=== Tourism ===
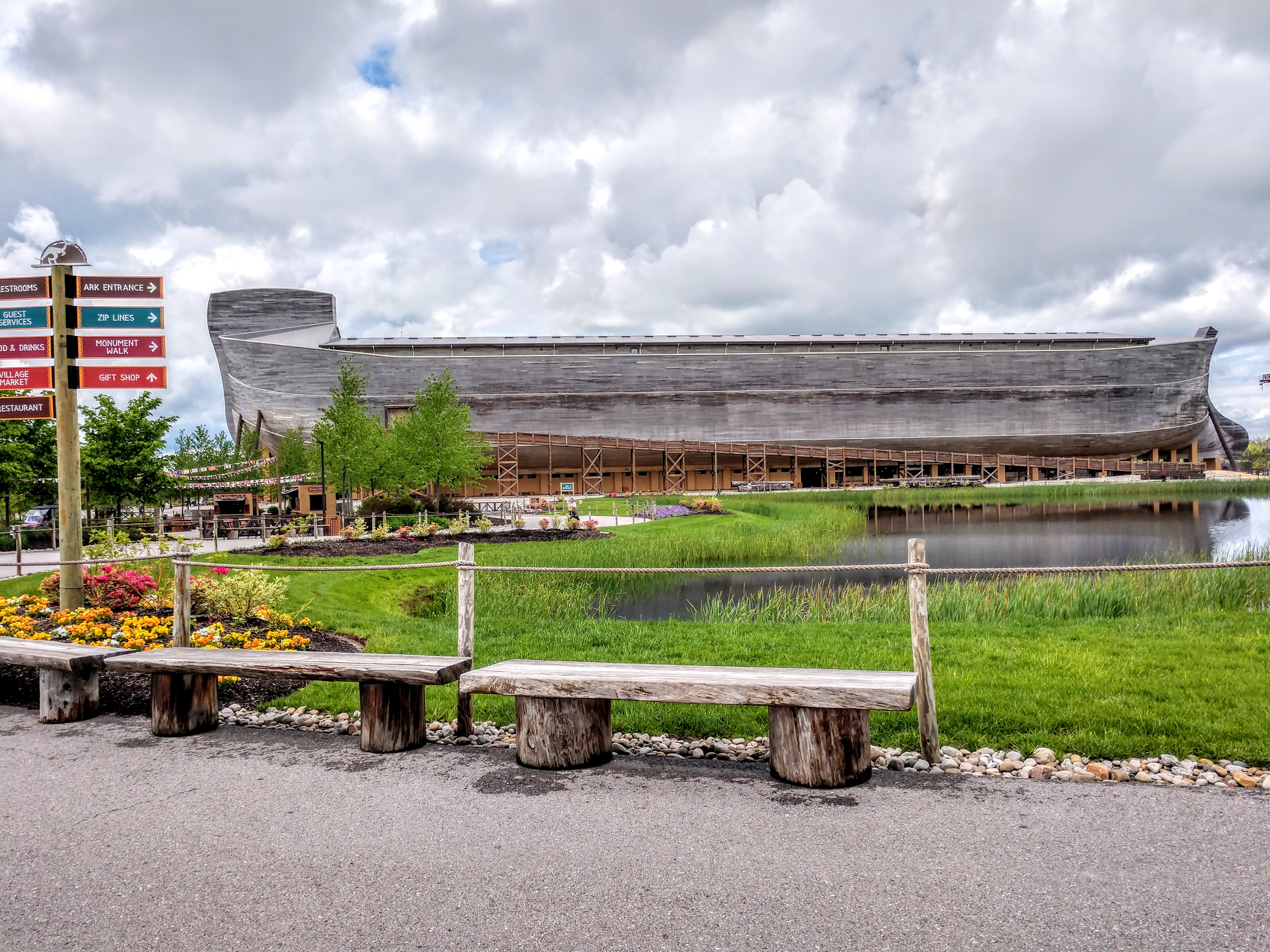
The Ark Encounter in Williamstown

Tourism has become an increasingly important part of the Kentucky economy. In 2019 tourism grew to $7.6 billion in economic impact. Key attractions include horse racing with events like the Kentucky Derby and the Keeneland Fall and Spring Meets, bourbon distillery tours, including along the Kentucky Bourbon Trail and Louisville Urban Bourbon Trail, and natural attractions such as the state's many lakes and parks to include Mammoth Cave National Park, Lake Cumberland and Red River Gorge. The National Corvette Museum in Bowling Green caters to sports car enthusiasts. Waterfront Botanical Gardens is an urban garden just outside Downtown Louisville. The Big Four Bridge, visited by 1.5 million visitors a year, is a pedestrian/bicycle bridge that crosses over the Ohio River from Louisville Waterfront Park to Jeffersonville, Indiana.

The state also has religious destinations such as the Creation Museum and Ark Encounter of Answers in Genesis.

In December 2002, Kentucky governor Paul E. Patton unveiled the state slogan "It's that friendly", in the hope of drawing more people into the state based on the idea of southern hospitality. Though it was meant to embrace southern values, many Kentuckians rejected the slogan as cheesy and generic. It was seen that the slogan did not encourage tourism as much as initially hoped for.

In 2004, then Governor Ernie Fletcher launched a comprehensive branding campaign with the hope of making the state's $12–14 million advertising budget more effective. The resulting "Unbridled Spirit" brand was the result of a $500,000 contract with New West, a Kentucky-based public relations advertising and marketing firm, to develop a viable brand and tag line. The Fletcher administration aggressively marketed the brand in both the public and private sectors. Since that time, the "Welcome to Kentucky" signs at border areas have an "Unbridled Spirit" symbol on them.

=== Horse industry ===
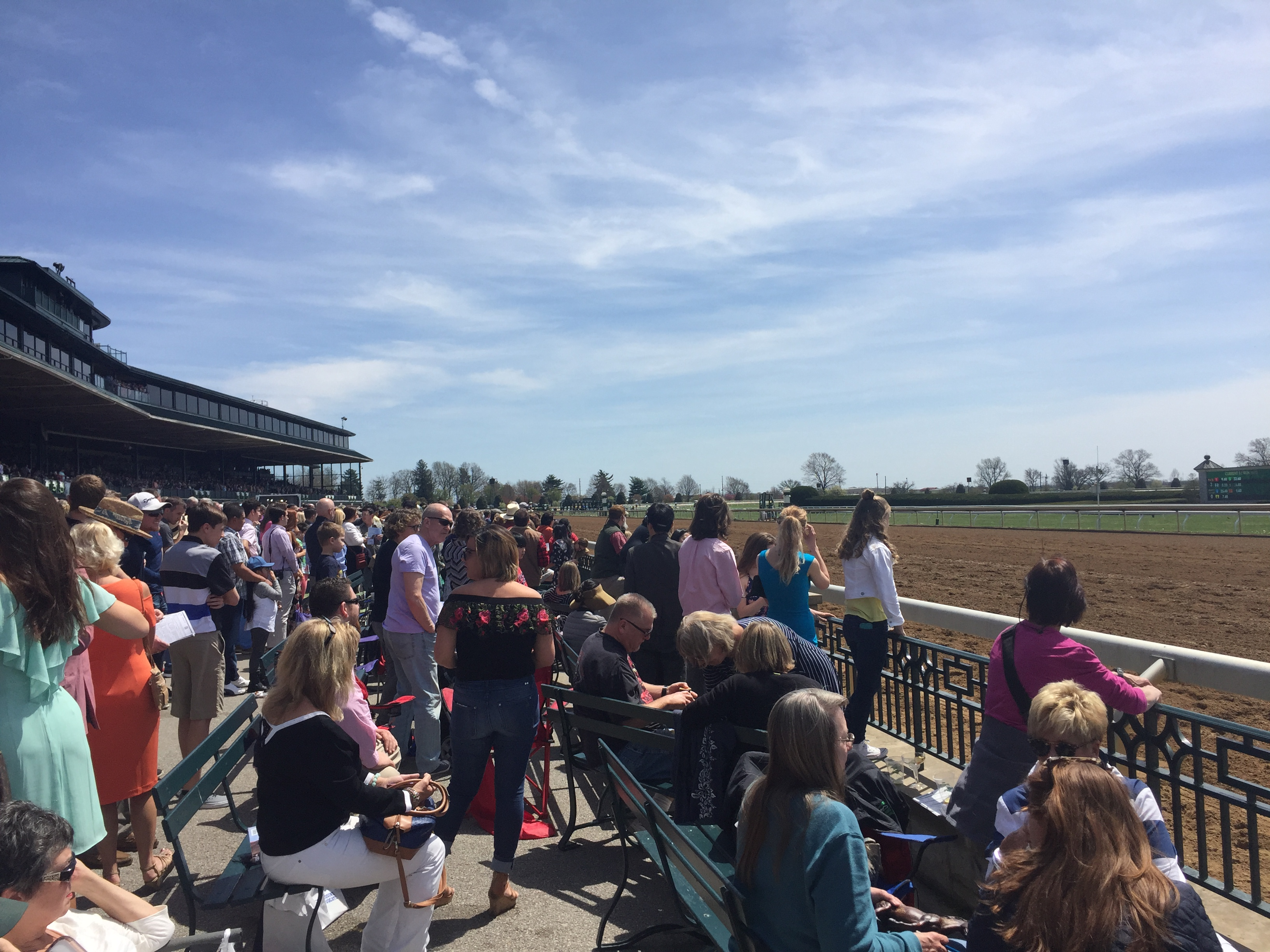
Spring running of Keeneland in Lexington

Horse racing has long been associated with Kentucky. Churchill Downs, the home of the Derby, is a large venue with a capacity exceeding 165,000. The track hosts multiple events throughout the year and is a significant draw to the city of Louisville. Keeneland Race Course, in Lexington, hosts two major meets, the Spring and Fall running. Beyond hosting races Keeneland also hosts a significant horse auction drawing buyers from around the world. In 2019 $360 million was spent on the September Yearling sale. The Kentucky Horse Park in Georgetown hosts multiple events throughout the year, including international equestrian competitions and also offers horseback riding from April to October.

== Education ==
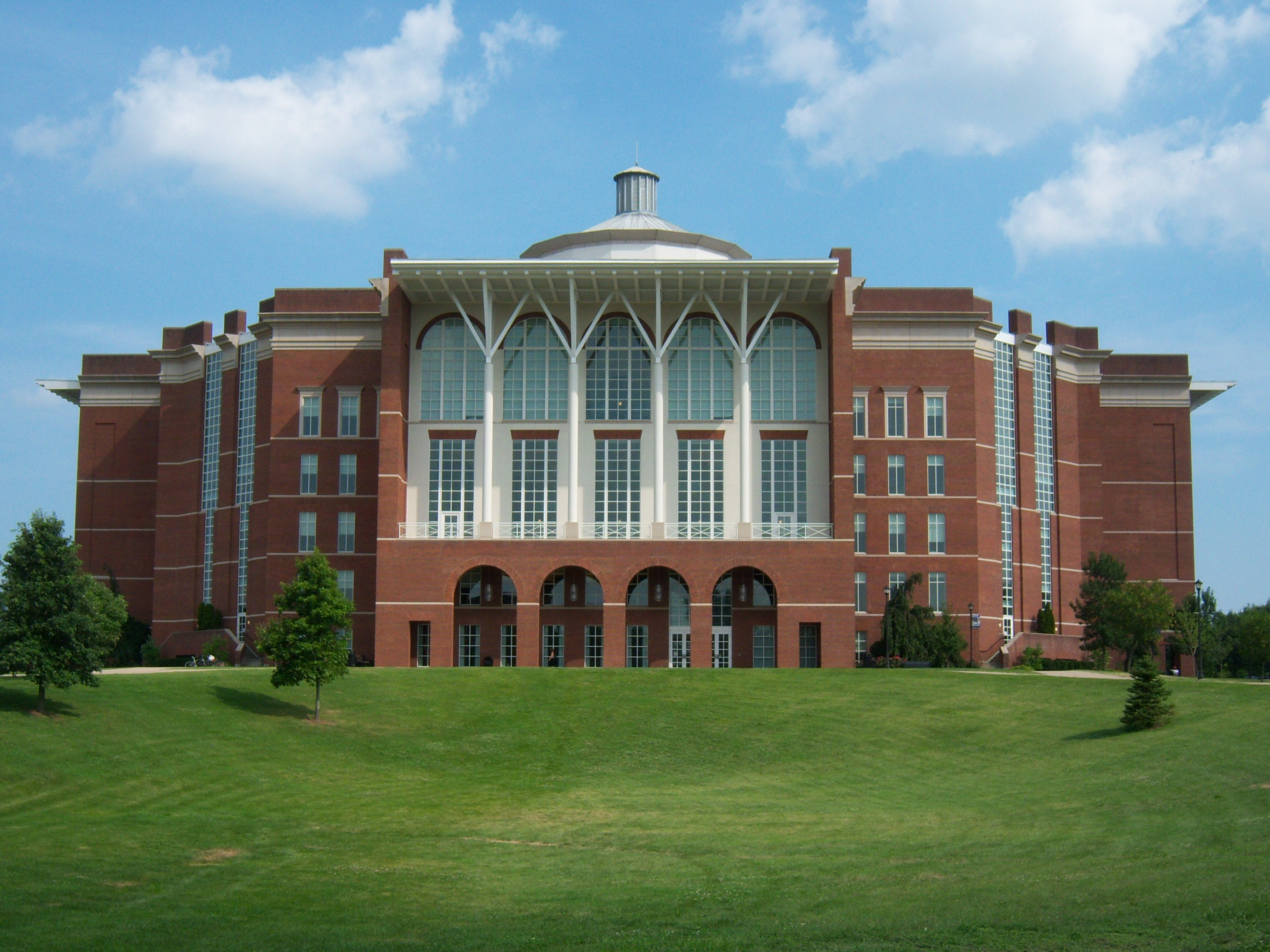
William T. Young Library at the University of Kentucky, Kentucky's flagship university

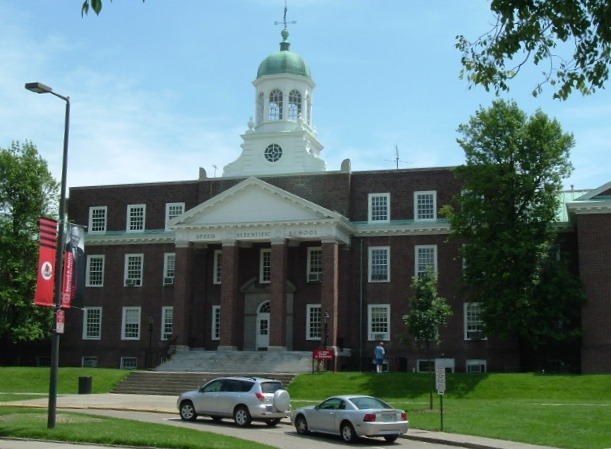
The J.B. Speed School of Engineering at the University of Louisville, Kentucky's urban research university

Kentucky maintains eight public four-year universities. There are two general tiers: major research institutions (the University of Kentucky and the University of Louisville) and regional universities, which encompass the remaining six schools. The regional schools have specific target counties that many of their programs are targeted towards (such as Forestry at Eastern Kentucky University or Cave Management at Western Kentucky University), however, most of their curriculum varies little from any other public university.

The University of Kentucky (UK) and the University of Louisville (UofL) have the highest academic rankings and admissions standards although the regional schools are not without their national recognized departments – examples being Western Kentucky University's nationally ranked Journalism Department or Morehead State University offering one of the nation's only Space Science degrees. UK is the flagship and land grant of the system and has agriculture extension services in every county. The two research schools split duties related to the medical field, UK handles all medical outreach programs in the eastern half of the state while UofL does all medical outreach in the state's western half.

The state's sixteen public two-year colleges have been governed by the Kentucky Community and Technical College System since the passage of the Postsecondary Education Improvement Act of 1997, commonly referred to as House Bill 1. Before the passage of House Bill 1, most of these colleges were under the control of the University of Kentucky.

Transylvania University, a liberal arts university located in Lexington, was founded in 1780 as the oldest university west of the Allegheny Mountains.

Berea College, located at the extreme southern edge of the Bluegrass below the Cumberland Plateau, was the first coeducational college in the South to admit both Black and white students, doing so from its very establishment in 1855. A state law in 1904 ended integration, and the law was upheld by the United States Supreme Court in the case of Berea College v. Kentucky in 1908.The state law was repealed in 1950 and Berea resumed integration.

There are 173 school districts and 1,233 public schools in Kentucky. For the 2010 to 2011 school year, there were approximately 647,827 students enrolled in public school.

Kentucky has been the site of much educational reform over the past two decades. In 1989 the Kentucky Supreme Court ruled the state's education system was unconstitutional. The response of the General Assembly was passage of the Kentucky Education Reform Act (KERA) the following year. Years later, Kentucky has shown progress, but most agree that further reform is needed.

The West Virginia teachers' strike in 2018 inspired teachers in other states, including Kentucky, to take similar action.

== Transportation ==
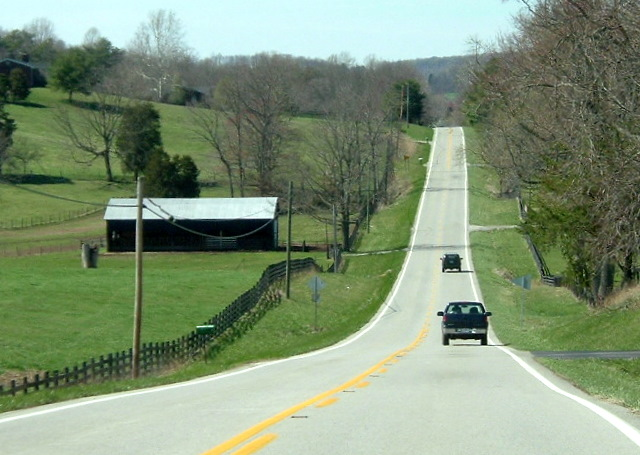
At 484 miles (779 km) long, Kentucky Route 80 is the longest route in Kentucky, pictured here west of Somerset.

=== Roads and bridges ===
Kentucky is served by six major Interstate highways (I-24, I-64, I-65, I-69, I-71, and I-75), seven parkways, and six bypasses and spurs (I-165, I-169, I-264, I-265, I-275, and I-471). The parkways were originally toll roads, but on November 22, 2006, Governor Ernie Fletcher ended the toll charges on the William H. Natcher Parkway and the Audubon Parkway, the last two parkways in Kentucky to charge tolls for access. The related toll booths have been demolished.

In June 2007, a law went into effect raising the speed limit on rural portions of Kentucky Interstates and parkways from 65 to 70 miles per hour (105 to 113 km/h).

The multi-billion-dollar Brent Spence Bridge Corridor Project across the Ohio River will construct a new double-deck companion bridge to carry interstate highway through-traffic, while the existing Brent Spence Bridge will be reconfigured for local traffic only, between Cincinnati and Covington. Approximately eight miles of improved roadways spanning Kentucky and Ohio will be constructed. The total project cost is estimated at $3.6 billion, and a federal grant of $1.6 billion was awarded in late 2022 to the project, with the remaining cost evenly split between Ohio and Kentucky. Major construction is expected to begin in 2026. Gov. Beshear said there will be no tolls. Also across the Ohio River, the I-69 Ohio River Crossing has been under development since 2022. Connecting Evansville, Indiana and Henderson, Kentucky, the bridge will cost around $1.5 billion. Construction is slated to start in 2027, with a hopeful completion date around 2031.

Road tunnels include the interstate Cumberland Gap Tunnel and the rural Nada Tunnel.

=== Rails ===
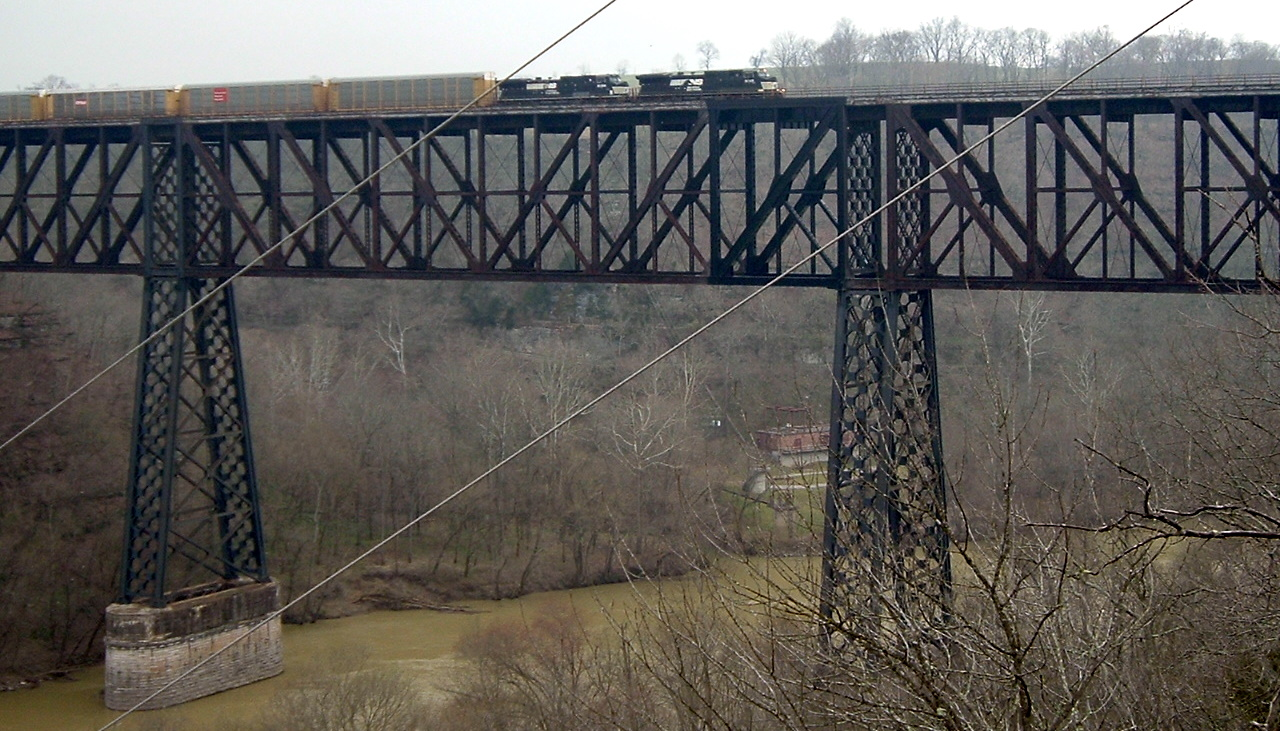
High Bridge over the Kentucky River was the tallest rail bridge in the world when it was completed in 1877.

Amtrak, the national passenger rail system, provides service to Ashland, South Portsmouth, Maysville and Fulton. The Cardinal (trains 50 and 51) is the line that offers Amtrak service to Ashland, South Shore, Maysville and South Portsmouth. The City of New Orleans (trains 58 and 59) serve Fulton. The Northern Kentucky area is served by the Cardinal at Cincinnati Union Terminal. The terminal is just across the Ohio River in Cincinnati.

Norfolk Southern Railway passes through the Central and Southern parts of the commonwealth, via its Cincinnati, New Orleans, and Texas Pacific (CNO&TP) subsidiary. The line originates in Cincinnati and terminates 338 miles south in Chattanooga, Tennessee.

As of 2004, there were approximately 2,640 miles (4,250 km) of railways in Kentucky, with about 65% of those being operated by CSX Transportation. Coal was by far the most common cargo, accounting for 76% of cargo loaded and 61% of cargo delivered.

Bardstown features a tourist attraction known as My Old Kentucky Dinner Train. Run along a 20-mile (30 km) stretch of rail purchased from CSX in 1987, guests are served a four-course meal as they make a two-and-a-half-hour round-trip between Bardstown and Limestone Springs. The Kentucky Railway Museum is located in nearby New Haven.

Other areas in Kentucky are reclaiming old railways in rail trail projects. One such project is Louisville's Big Four Bridge. When the bridge's Indiana approach ramps opened in 2014, completing the pedestrian connection across the Ohio River, the Big Four Bridge rail trail became the second-longest pedestrian-only bridge in the world. The longest pedestrian-only bridge is also found in Kentucky – the Newport Southbank Bridge, popularly known as the "Purple People Bridge", connecting Newport to Cincinnati, Ohio.

=== Air ===
Kentucky's primary airports include Louisville International Airport (Standiford Field (SDF)) of Louisville, Cincinnati/Northern Kentucky International Airport (CVG) of Cincinnati/Covington, and Blue Grass Airport (LEX) in Lexington. Louisville International Airport is home to UPS's Worldport, its international air-sorting hub. Cincinnati/Northern Kentucky International Airport is the largest airport in the state, and is a focus city for passenger airline Delta Air Lines and headquarters of its Delta Private Jets. The airport is one of DHL Aviation's three super-hubs, serving destinations throughout the Americas, Europe, Africa, and Asia, making it the 7th busiest airport in the U.S. and 36th in the world based on passenger and cargo operations. CVG is also a focus city for Frontier Airlines and is the largest O&D airport and base for Allegiant Air, along with home to a maintenance for American Airlines subsidiary PSA Airlines and Delta Air Lines subsidiary Endeavor Air. There are also a number of regional airports scattered across the state.

On August 27, 2006, Blue Grass Airport was the site of a crash that killed 47 passengers and 2 crew members aboard a Bombardier CRJ designated Comair Flight 191, or Delta Air Lines Flight 5191, sometimes mistakenly identified by the press as Comair Flight 5191. The lone survivor was the flight's first officer, James Polehinke, who doctors determined to be brain damaged and unable to recall the crash at all.

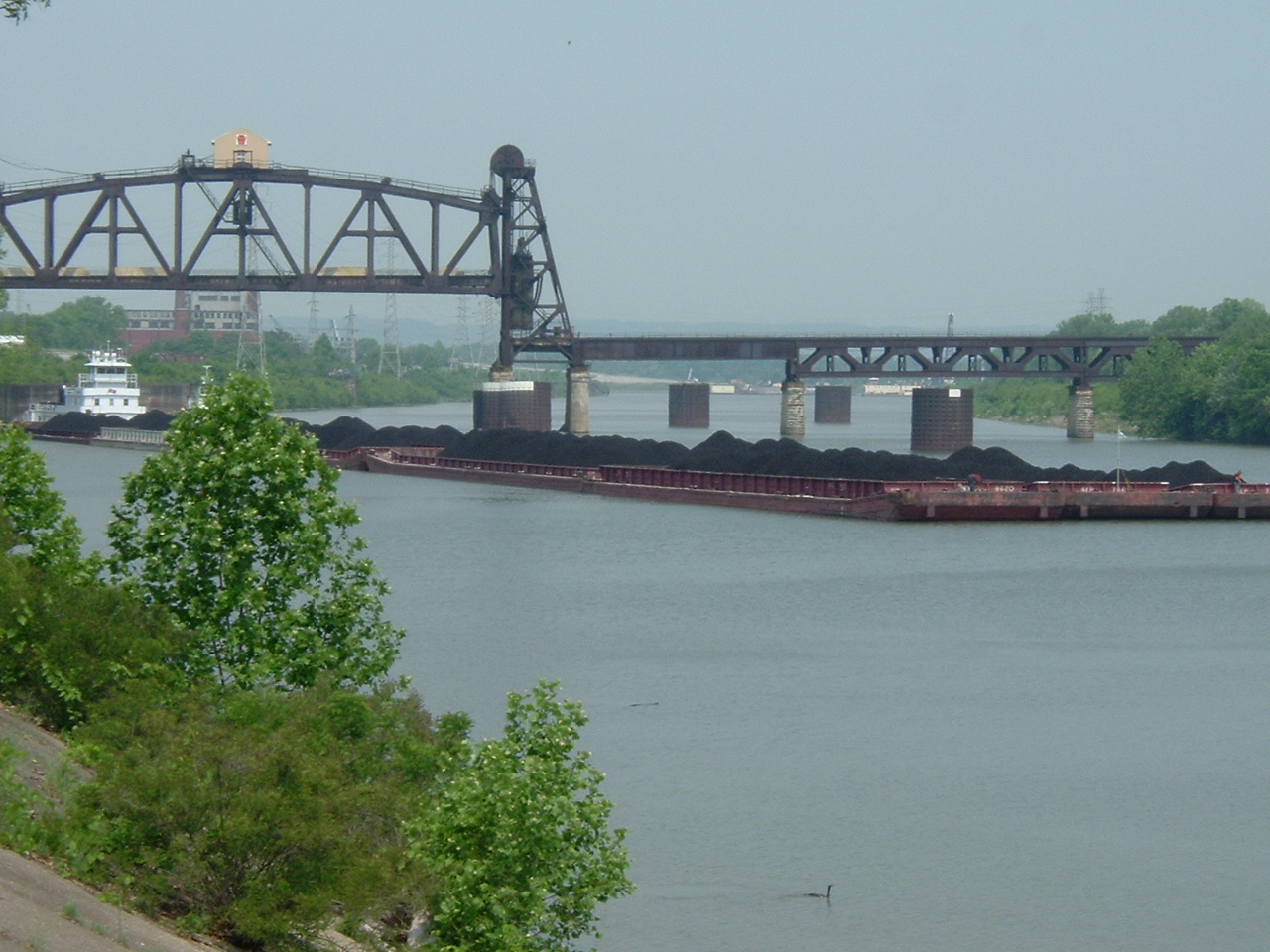
A barge hauling coal in the Louisville and Portland Canal, the only human-made section of the Ohio River

=== Water ===
As the state is bounded by two of the largest rivers in North America, water transportation has historically played a major role in Kentucky's economy. Louisville was a major port for steamships in the nineteenth century. Today, most barge traffic on Kentucky waterways consists of coal that is shipped from both the Eastern and Western Coalfields, about half of which is used locally to power many power plants located directly off the Ohio River, with the rest being exported to other countries, most notably Japan.

Many of the largest ports in the United States are located in or adjacent to Kentucky, including:

- Huntington-Tristate (includes Ashland, Kentucky), largest inland port and 7th largest overall
- Cincinnati-Northern Kentucky, 5th largest inland port and 43rd overall
- Louisville-Southern Indiana, 7th largest inland port and 55th overall

As a state, Kentucky ranks 10th overall in port tonnage.

The only natural obstacle along the entire length of the Ohio River is the Falls of the Ohio, located just west of Downtown Louisville.

== Law and government ==
Kentucky is one of four U.S. states to officially use the term commonwealth. The term was used for Kentucky as it had also been used by Virginia, from which Kentucky was created. The term has no particular significance in its meaning and was chosen to emphasize the distinction from the status of royal colonies as a place governed for the general welfare of the populace. Kentucky was originally styled as the "State of Kentucky" in the act admitting it to the Union and its first constitution.

The "Commonwealth" term was used in citizen petitions submitted between 1786 and 1792 for the creation of the state. It was also used in the title of a history of the state that was published in 1834 and was used in various places within that book in references to Virginia and Kentucky. The other three states officially called "commonwealths" are Massachusetts, Pennsylvania, and Virginia; the territories of Puerto Rico and the Northern Mariana Islands are also formally commonwealths.

Kentucky is one of only five states that elect their state officials in odd-numbered years (the others being Louisiana, Mississippi, New Jersey, and Virginia). Kentucky holds elections for these offices every four years in the years preceding Presidential election years. Thus, Kentucky held gubernatorial elections in 2015, 2019 and 2023.

=== Executive branch ===
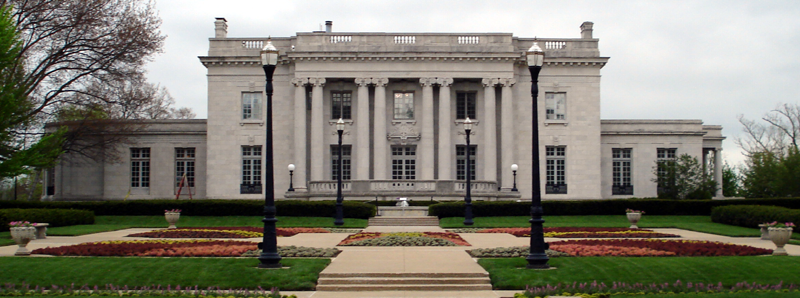
The governor's mansion in Frankfort

The executive branch is headed by the governor, who serves as both head of state and head of government. The lieutenant governor may or may not have executive authority depending on whether the person is a member of the governor's cabinet. Under the current Kentucky Constitution, the lieutenant governor assumes the duties of the governor only if the governor is incapacitated. (Before 1992 the lieutenant governor assumed power any time the governor was out of the state.) The governor and lieutenant governor usually run on a single ticket (also per a 1992 constitutional amendment) and are elected to four-year terms. The current governor is Andy Beshear, and the lieutenant governor is Jacqueline Coleman. Both are Democrats.

The executive branch is organized into the following "cabinets", each headed by a secretary who is also a member of the governor's cabinet:

- General Government Cabinet
- Transportation Cabinet
- Cabinet for Economic Development
- Finance and Administration Cabinet
- Tourism, Arts, and Heritage Cabinet
- Education and Workforce Development Cabinet
- Cabinet for Health and Family Services
- Justice and Public Safety Cabinet
- Personnel Cabinet
- Labor Cabinet
- Energy and Environment Cabinet
- Public Protection Cabinet

The cabinet system was introduced in 1972 by Governor Wendell Ford to consolidate hundreds of government entities that reported directly to the governor's office.

Other elected constitutional offices include the secretary of state, attorney general, auditor of public accounts, state treasurer, and commissioner of agriculture. Currently, Republican Michael G. Adams serves as the secretary of state. The commonwealth's chief prosecutor, law enforcement officer, and law officer is the attorney general, currently Republican Russell Coleman. The auditor of public accounts is Republican Allison Ball. Republican Mark Metcalf is the current treasurer. Republican Jonathan Shell is the current commissioner of agriculture.

=== Legislative branch ===
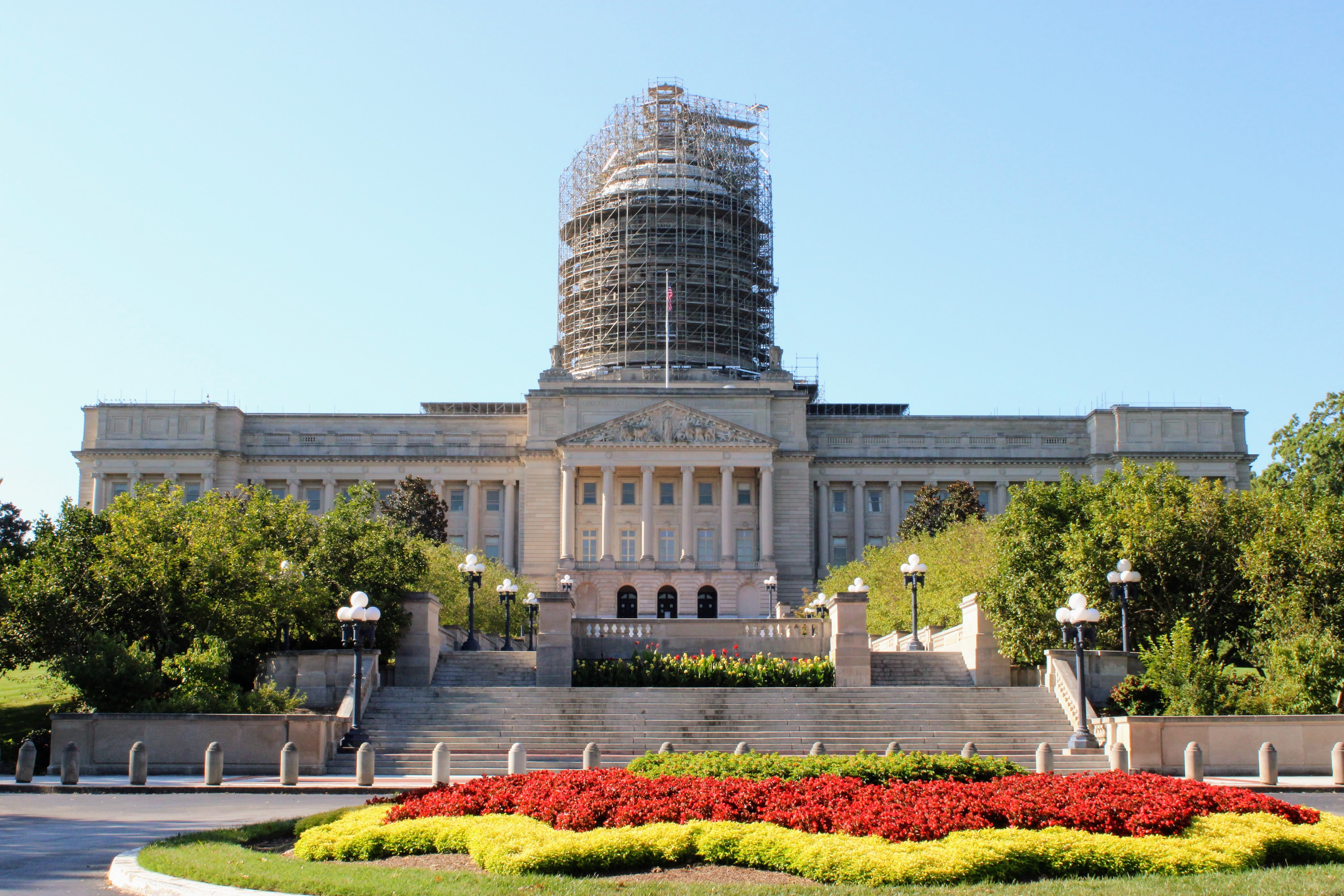
The Kentucky State Capitol Building

Kentucky's legislative branch consists of a bicameral body known as the Kentucky General Assembly. The Senate is considered the upper house. It has 38 members and is led by the president of the Senate, currently Robert Stivers (R). The House of Representatives has 100 members, and is led by the speaker of the House, currently David Osborne of the Republican Party.

In 2016, Republicans won control of the House for the first time since 1922. The party currently holds supermajorities in both chambers.

=== Judicial branch ===
The judicial branch of Kentucky is called the Kentucky Court of Justice and comprises courts of limited jurisdiction called District Courts; courts of general jurisdiction called Circuit Courts; specialty courts such as Drug Court and Family Court; an intermediate appellate court, the Kentucky Court of Appeals; and a court of last resort, the Kentucky Supreme Court.

The Kentucky Court of Justice is headed by the chief justice of the Commonwealth. The chief justice is appointed by, and is an elected member of, the Supreme Court of Kentucky. The current chief justice is Laurance VanMeter.

Unlike federal judges, who are usually appointed, justices serving on Kentucky state courts are chosen by the state's populace in non-partisan elections.

=== Federal representation ===
A map showing Kentucky's six congressional districts

Kentucky's two U.S. senators are Mitch McConnell and Rand Paul, both Republicans. The state is divided into six congressional districts, represented by Republicans James Comer (1st), Brett Guthrie (2nd), Thomas Massie (4th), Hal Rogers (5th) and Andy Barr (6th) and Democrat Morgan McGarvey (3rd).

In the federal judiciary, Kentucky is served by two United States district courts: the Eastern District of Kentucky, with its primary seat in Lexington, and the Western District of Kentucky, with its primary seat in Louisville. Appeals are heard in the Court of Appeals for the Sixth Circuit, based in Cincinnati, Ohio.

=== Law ===
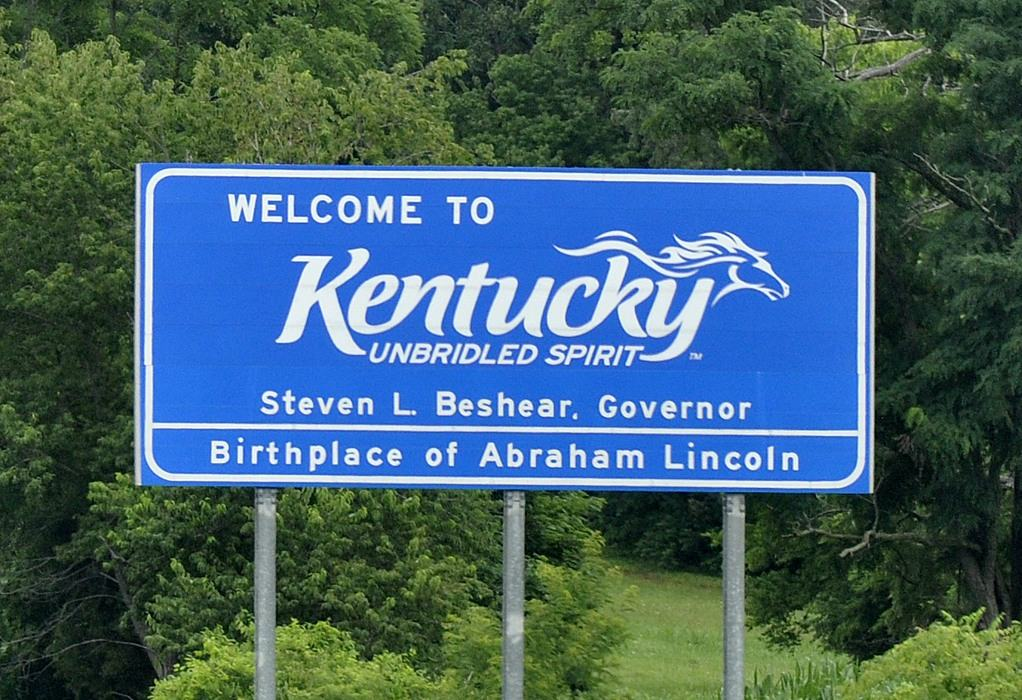
State sign, Interstate 65

Kentucky's body of laws, known as the Kentucky Revised Statutes (KRS), were enacted in 1942 to better organize and clarify the whole of Kentucky law. The statutes are enforced by local police, sheriffs and deputy sheriffs, and constables and deputy constables. Unless they have completed a police academy elsewhere, these officers are required to complete Police Officer Professional Standards (POPS) training at the Kentucky Department of Criminal Justice Training Center on the campus of Eastern Kentucky University in Richmond. Additionally, in 1948, the Kentucky General Assembly established the Kentucky State Police, making it the 38th state to create a force whose jurisdiction extends throughout the given state.

Kentucky is one of the 32 states in the United States that sanctions the death penalty for certain murders defined as heinous. Those convicted of capital crimes after March 31, 1998, are always executed by lethal injection; those convicted on or before this date may opt for the electric chair. Only three people have been executed in Kentucky since the U.S. Supreme Court re-instituted the practice in 1976. The most notable execution in Kentucky was that of Rainey Bethea on August 14, 1936. Bethea was publicly hanged in Owensboro for the rape and murder of Lischia Edwards. Irregularities with the execution led to this becoming the last public execution in the United States.

Kentucky has been on the front lines of the debate over displaying the Ten Commandments on public property. In the 2005 case of McCreary County v. ACLU of Kentucky, the U.S. Supreme Court upheld the decision of the Sixth Circuit Court of Appeals that a display of the Ten Commandments in the Whitley City courthouse of McCreary County was unconstitutional. Later that year, Judge Richard Fred Suhrheinrich, writing for the Sixth Circuit Court of Appeals in the case of ACLU of Kentucky v. Mercer County, wrote that a display including the Mayflower Compact, the Declaration of Independence, the Ten Commandments, Magna Carta, The Star-Spangled Banner, and the national motto could be erected in the Mercer County courthouse.

Kentucky has been known to have unusually high political candidacy age laws, especially compared to surrounding states. The origin of this is unknown.

=== Politics ===
Treemap of the popular vote by county, 2016 presidential election

Voter registration as of August 1, 2026
Party	Registration	
Party	Voters	%
Republican	1,622,656	48.05
Democratic	1,370,754	40.59
Independent	178,517	5.29
Libertarian	15,892	0.47
Green	2,603	0.08
Constitution	1,622	0.05
Socialist Workers	733	0.02
Kentucky	281	0.01
Reform	245	0.01
"Other"	183,996	5.45
Total	3,377,299	100.0

Since the late 1990s, Kentucky has supported Republican candidates for most federal political offices, and, more recently, for state-level office as well. The state leaned toward the Democratic Party from 1860 through the 1990s, and was considered a swing state at the presidential level for most of the latter half of the 20th century.

The southeastern region of the state aligned with the Union during the war and has consistently supported Republican candidates. The central and western portions of the state were heavily Democratic in the years leading to the Civil War, were pro-secessionist and pro-Confederate during the Civil War, and in the decades following the war. Kentucky was part of the Democratic Solid South in the second half of the nineteenth century and through the majority of the twentieth century.

Mirroring a broader national reversal of party composition, the Kentucky Democratic Party of the twenty-first century primarily consists of liberal whites, African Americans, and other minorities. Although most of the state's voters have reliably elected Republican candidates for federal office since the late 1990s, Democrats held an advantage in party registration until 2022. On July 15, 2022, the Kentucky secretary of state's office announced that for the first time in its history, the commonwealth had more registered Republicans than registered Democrats, with 45.19% of the state's voters registered as Republicans, 45.12% registered as Democrats, and 9.69% registered with another political party or as independents.

From 1964 through 2004, Kentucky voted for the eventual winner of the election for President of the United States; however, in the 2008 election the state lost its bellwether status. Republican John McCain won Kentucky, but he lost the national popular and electoral vote to Democrat Barack Obama (McCain carried Kentucky 57% to 41%). 116 of Kentucky's 120 counties supported former Massachusetts governor Mitt Romney in the 2012 election while he lost to Barack Obama nationwide.

Voters in the commonwealth have supported the previous three Democratic candidates elected to the White House in the late 20th century, all from Southern states: Lyndon B. Johnson (Texas) in 1964, Jimmy Carter (Georgia) in 1976, and Bill Clinton (Arkansas) in 1992 and 1996. In the twenty-first century presidential elections, the state has become a Republican stronghold, supporting that party's presidential candidates by double-digit margins from 2000 through 2020. At the same time, voters have continued to elect Democratic candidates to state and local offices in many jurisdictions.

Elliott County, Kentucky is notable for having held the longest streak of any county in the United States voting Democratic. Founded in 1869, Elliott County supported the Democratic nominee in every presidential election from 1872 (the first in which it participated) until 2012. In 2016, Donald Trump became the first Republican to ever carry the county, and he did so in a 44-point landslide, highlighting the modern Republican Party's dominance among rural whites and many ancestrally Democratic, socially-conservative voters.

Kentucky is one of the most anti-abortion states in the United States. A 2014 poll conducted by Pew Research Center found that 57% of Kentucky's population thought that abortion should be illegal in all/most cases, while only 36% thought that abortion should be legal in all/most cases.

In a 2020 study, Kentucky was ranked as the 8th hardest state for citizens to vote in.

== Culture ==
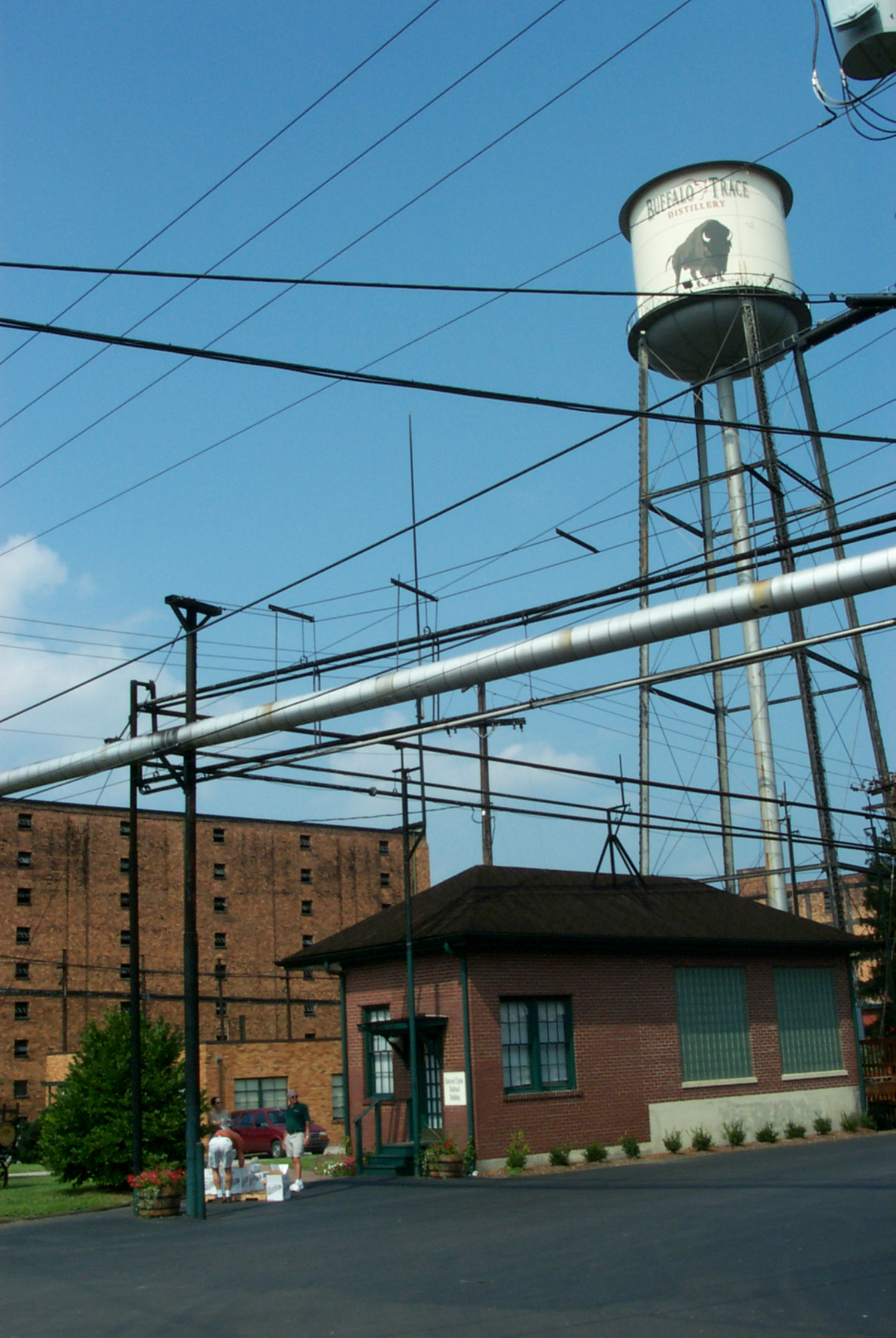
The Buffalo Trace Distillery

Kentucky culture is firmly Southern, and influenced by that of Appalachia. The state is known for bourbon and whiskey distilling, tobacco, horse racing, and college basketball. Kentucky is more similar to the Upland South in terms of ancestry that is predominantly American.

Nevertheless, during the 19th century, Kentucky did receive a substantial number of German immigrants, who settled mostly in the Midwest and parts of the Upper South, along the Ohio River primarily in Louisville, Covington and Newport. Only Maryland, Delaware and West Virginia have higher German ancestry percentages than Kentucky among Census-defined Southern states, although Kentucky's percentage is closer to Arkansas and Virginia's than the previously named state's percentages. Scottish Americans, English Americans and Scotch-Irish Americans have heavily influenced Kentucky culture, and are present in every part of the state. As of the 1980s the only counties in the United States where more than half the population cited "English" as their only ancestry group were all in the hills of eastern Kentucky (and made up virtually every county in this region).

Kentucky was a slave state, and Black people once composed over one-quarter of its population; however, it lacked the cotton plantation system though it did support significant and large scale tobacco plantation systems in the western and central parts of the state more similar to the plantations developed in Virginia and North Carolina than those in the Deep South, and never had the same high percentage of African Americans as most other slave states. While less than 8% of the total population is Black, Kentucky has a relatively significant rural African American population in the Central and Western areas of the state.

Kentucky adopted the Jim Crow system of racial segregation in most public spheres after the Civil War. Louisville's 1914 ordinance for residential racial segregation was struck down by the Supreme Court in 1917. However, in 1908 Kentucky enacted the Day Law, "An Act to Prohibit White and Colored Persons from Attending the Same School", which Berea College unsuccessfully challenged at the US Supreme Court in 1908. In 1948, Lyman T. Johnson filed suit for admission to the University of Kentucky; as a result, nearly thirty African American students entered UK graduate and professional programs in the summer of 1949. Kentucky integrated its schools after the 1954 Brown v. Board of Education verdict, later adopting the first state civil rights act in the South in 1966.

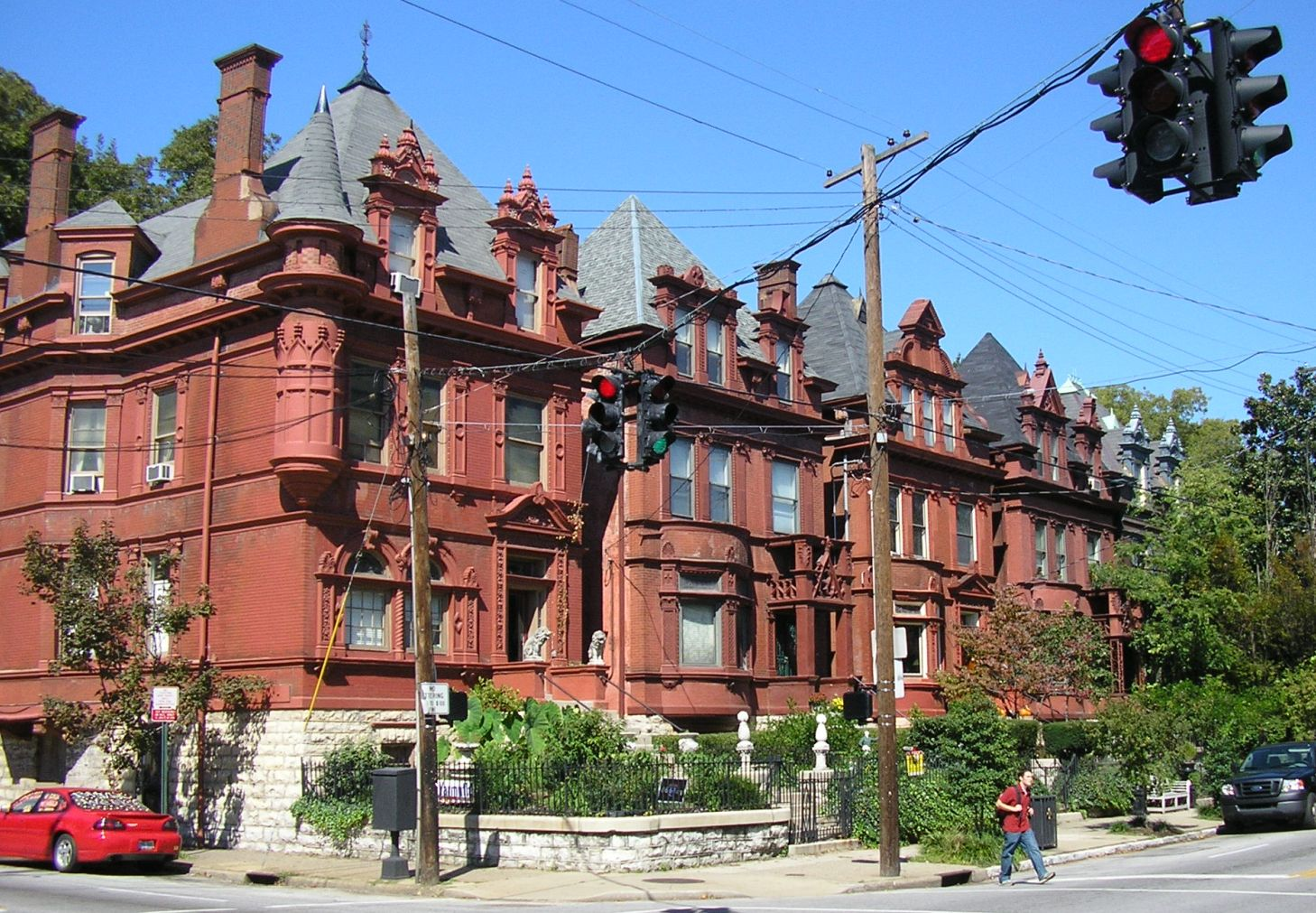
Old Louisville is the largest Victorian Historic neighborhood in the United States.

Kentucky commemorates Confederate Memorial Day but added Juneteenth as a holiday by proclamation of Governor Andy Beshear in 2024. The biggest day in American horse racing, the Kentucky Derby, is preceded by the two-week Derby Festival in Louisville. The Derby Festival features many events, including Thunder Over Louisville, the Pegasus Parade, the Great Steamboat Race, Fest-a-Ville, the Chow Wagon, BalloonFest, BourbonVille, and many others leading up to the big race.

Louisville also plays host to the Kentucky State Fair and the Kentucky Shakespeare Festival. Bowling Green, the state's third-largest city and home to the only assembly plant in the world that manufactures the Chevrolet Corvette, opened the National Corvette Museum in 1994. The fourth-largest city, Owensboro, gives credence to its nickname of "Barbecue Capital of the World" by hosting the annual International Bar-B-Q Festival.

Old Louisville, the largest historic preservation district in the United States featuring Victorian architecture and the third largest overall, hosts the St. James Court Art Show, the largest outdoor art show in the United States. The neighborhood was also home to the Southern Exposition (1883–1887), which featured the first public display of Thomas Edison's light bulb, and was the setting of Alice Hegan Rice's novel, Mrs. Wiggs of the Cabbage Patch.

Fairview was the birthplace of Jefferson Davis, who would become President of the Confederate States of America; the town had the Jefferson Davis Memorial, a 351-foot concrete obelisk, built in 1917. Hodgenville, the birthplace of Abraham Lincoln, hosts the annual Lincoln Days Celebration, and also hosted the kick-off for the National Abraham Lincoln Bicentennial Celebration in February 2008. Bardstown celebrates its heritage as a major bourbon-producing region with the Kentucky Bourbon Festival. Glasgow mimics Glasgow, Scotland by hosting the Glasgow Highland Games, its own version of the Highland Games, and Sturgis hosts "Little Sturgis", a mini version of Sturgis, South Dakota's annual Sturgis Motorcycle Rally.

The state is famous for quilts. The National Quilt Museum is in Paducah. It hosts QuiltWeek, an annual competition and celebration of that attracts artists and hobbyists from the world of quilting.

Winchester celebrates an original Kentucky creation, Beer Cheese, with its Beer Cheese Festival held annually in June. Beer Cheese was developed in Clark County at some point in the 1940s along the Kentucky River.

The residents of tiny Benton pay tribute to their favorite tuber, the sweet potato, by hosting Tater Day. Residents of Clarkson in Grayson County celebrate their city's ties to the honey industry by celebrating the Clarkson Honeyfest. The Clarkson Honeyfest is held the last Thursday, Friday and Saturday in September, and is the "Official State Honey Festival of Kentucky".

=== Music ===
Renfro Valley, Kentucky is home to Renfro Valley Entertainment Center and the Kentucky Music Hall of Fame and is known as "Kentucky's Country Music Capital", a designation given it by the Kentucky State Legislature in the late 1980s. The Renfro Valley Barn Dance was where Renfro Valley's musical heritage began, in 1939, and influential country music luminaries like Red Foley, Homer & Jethro, Lily May Ledford & the Original Coon Creek Girls, Martha Carson and many others have performed as regular members of the shows there over the years. The Renfro Valley Gatherin' is today America's second-oldest continually broadcast radio program of any kind. It is broadcast on local radio station WRVK and a syndicated network of nearly 200 other stations across the United States and Canada every week.

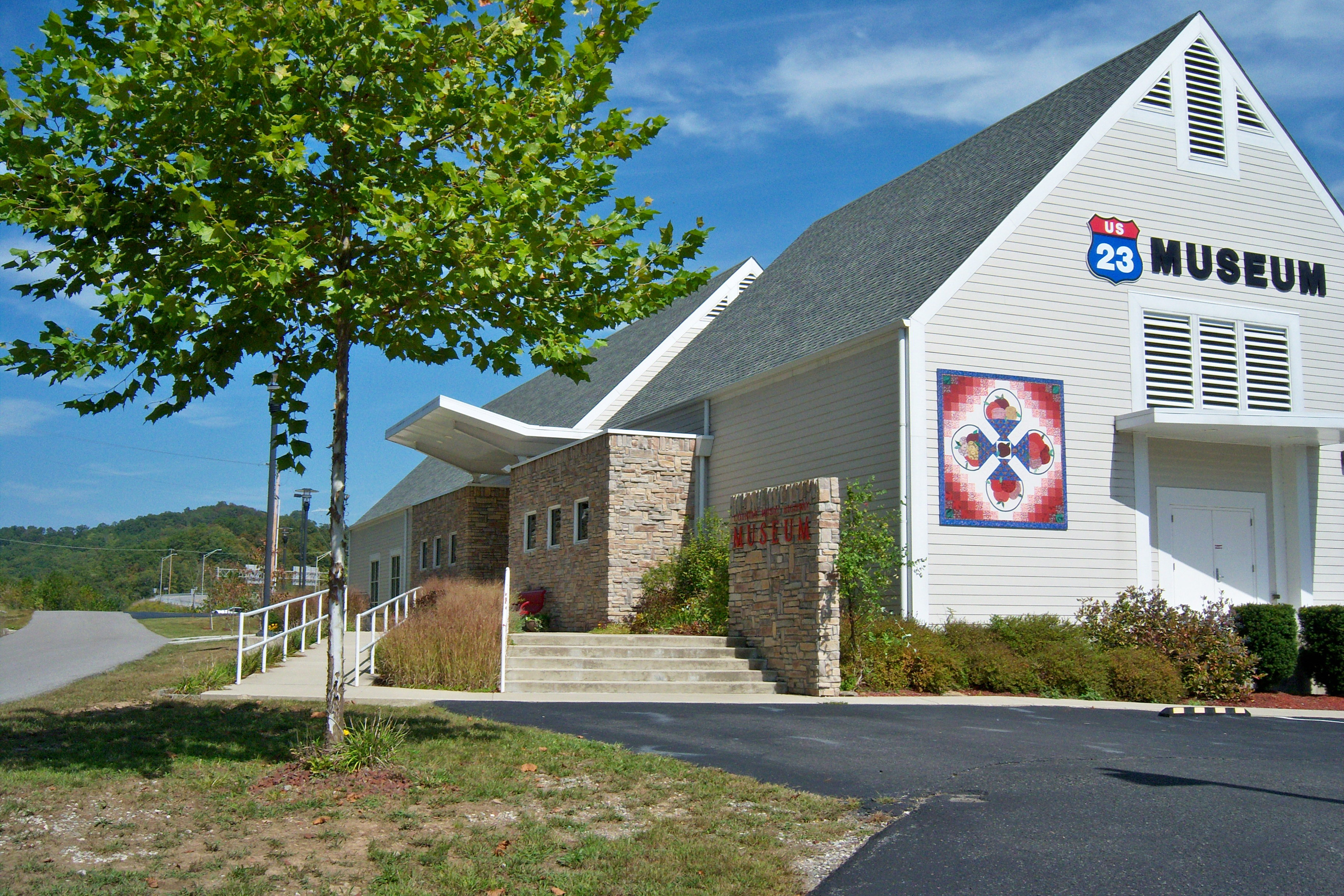
The U.S. 23 Country Music Highway Museum in Paintsville provides background on the country music artists from Eastern Kentucky.

Contemporary Christian music star Steven Curtis Chapman is a Paducah native, and Rock and Roll Hall of Famers the Everly Brothers are closely connected with Muhlenberg County, where older brother Don was born. Merle Travis, Country and Western artist known for both his signature "Travis picking" guitar playing style, as well as his hit song "Sixteen Tons", was also born in Muhlenberg County. Kentucky was also home to Mildred and Patty Hill, the Louisville sisters credited with composing the tune to the ditty Happy Birthday to You in 1893; Loretta Lynn (Johnson County), Brian Littrell and Kevin Richardson of the Backstreet Boys, and Billy Ray Cyrus (Flatwoods).

However, its depth lies in its signature sound – Bluegrass music. Bill Monroe, "The Father of Bluegrass", was born in the small Ohio County town of Rosine, while Ricky Skaggs, Keith Whitley, David "Stringbean" Akeman, Louis Marshall "Grandpa" Jones, Sonny and Bobby Osborne, and Sam Bush (who has been compared to Monroe) all hail from Kentucky. The Bluegrass Music Hall of Fame & Museum is located in Owensboro, while the annual Festival of the Bluegrass is held in Lexington.

Kentucky was also home to famed jazz musician Lionel Hampton. Blues legend W. C. Handy and R&B singer Wilson Pickett also spent considerable time in Kentucky. The R&B group Midnight Star and Hip-Hop group Nappy Roots were both formed in Kentucky, as were country acts the Kentucky Headhunters, Montgomery Gentry, Halfway to Hazard, the Judds, and Dove Award-winning Christian groups Audio Adrenaline and Bride. Black Stone Cherry hails from rural Edmonton. Indie rock bands Slint, My Morning Jacket, Wax Fang, White Reaper, and Tantric formed in Louisville; indie rock bands Cage the Elephant, Sleeper Agent, and Morning Teleportation are from Bowling Green. The bluegrass groups Driftwood and Kentucky Rain, along with Nick Lachey of the pop band 98 Degrees are also from Kentucky. King Crimson guitarist Adrian Belew is from Covington. Noted singer and actress Rosemary Clooney was a native of Maysville, her legacy being celebrated at the annual music festival bearing her name. Noted songwriter and actor Will Oldham is from Louisville. More recently in the limelight are country artists Chris Stapleton, Sturgill Simpson, Tyler Childers, and Chris Knight.

In eastern Kentucky, old-time music carries on the tradition of ancient ballads and reels developed in historical Appalachia.

=== Literature ===
Kentucky has played a major role in Southern and American literature, producing works that often celebrate the working class, rural life, nature, and explore issues of class, extractive economy, and family. Major works from the state include Uncle Tom's Cabin (1852) by Harriet Beecher Stowe, widely seen as one of the impetuses for the American Civil War; The Little Shepherd of Kingdom Come (1908) by John Fox Jr., which was the first novel to sell a million copies in the United States; All the King's Men by Robert Penn Warren (1946), rated as the 36th best English-language novel of the 20th century; The Dollmaker (1954) by Harriette Arnow; Night Comes to the Cumberlands (1962) by Harry Caudill, which contributed to initiating the U.S. Government's war on poverty, and others.

Author Thomas Merton lived most of his life and wrote most of his books – including The Seven Storey Mountain (1948), ranked on National Review's list of the 100 best non-fiction books of the century – during his time as a monk at the Abbey of Our Lady of Gethsemani near Bardstown, Kentucky. Author Hunter S. Thompson is also a native of the state. Since the later part of the 20th century, several writers from Kentucky have published widely read and critically acclaimed books, including: Wendell Berry (fl. 1960–), Silas House (fl. 2001–), Barbara Kingsolver (fl. 1988–), poet Maurice Manning (fl. 2001–), and Bobbie Ann Mason (fl. 1988–).

Well-known playwrights from Kentucky include Marsha Norman (works include 'night, Mother, 1983), Naomi Wallace (works include One Flea Spare, 1995), and George C. Wolfe (works include Jelly's Last Jam, 1992).

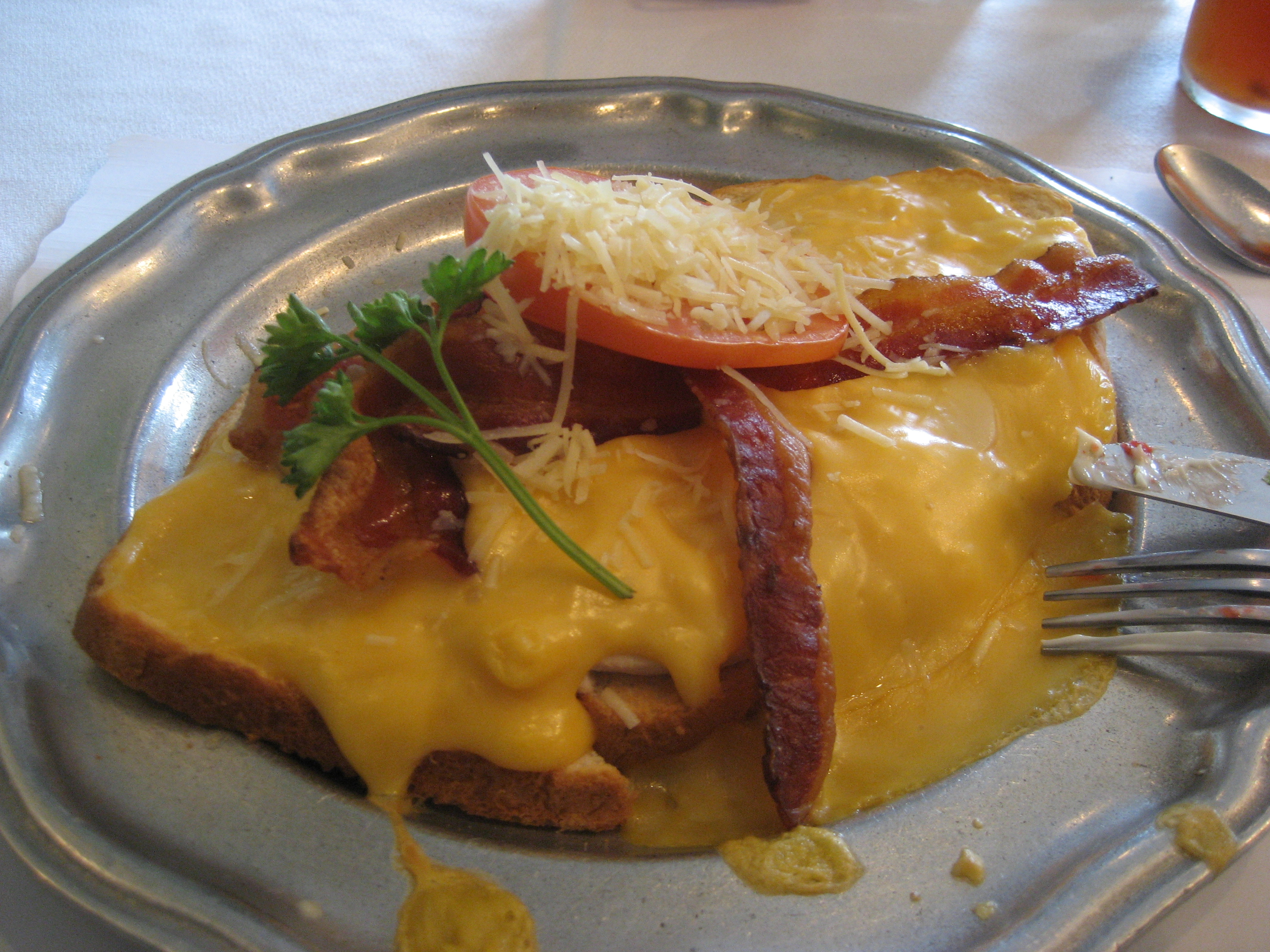
The Hot Brown

=== Cuisine ===
Kentucky's cuisine is generally similar to and is a part of traditional southern cooking, although in some areas of the state it can blend elements of both the South and Appalachia, mixing Appalachian with the native Southern cuisine of the area. One original Kentucky dish is called the Hot Brown, a dish normally layered in this order: toasted bread, turkey, bacon, tomatoes and topped with mornay sauce. It was developed at the Brown Hotel in Louisville. The Pendennis Club in Louisville is the birthplace of the Old Fashioned cocktail. Also, Western Kentucky is known for its own regional style of Southern barbecue. Central Kentucky is the birthplace of Beer Cheese.

Harland Sanders, a Kentucky colonel, originated Kentucky Fried Chicken at his service station in North Corbin, though the first franchised KFC was located in South Salt Lake, Utah.

=== Sports ===
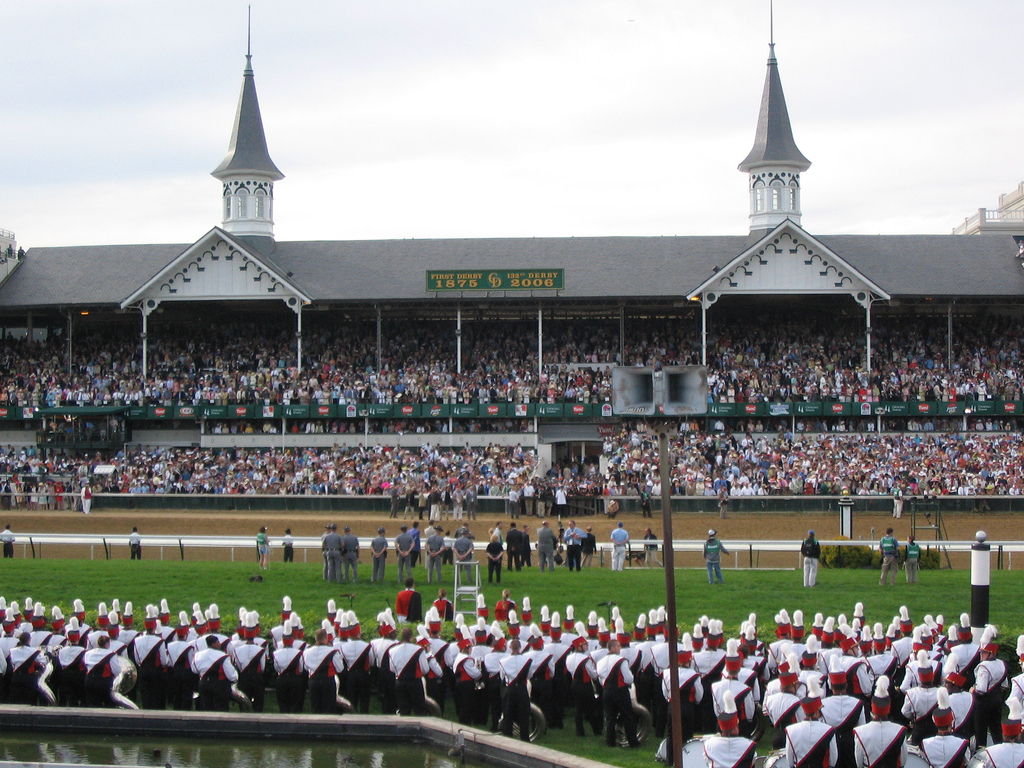
Kentucky's Churchill Downs hosts the Kentucky Derby.

Kentucky is the home of sports teams such as Minor League Baseball's Triple-A Louisville Bats and High-A Bowling Green Hot Rods. It is home to the independent Atlantic League of Professional Baseball's Lexington Legends and the Frontier League's Florence Y'alls. The Lexington Horsemen and Louisville Fire of the now-defunct af2 had been interested in making a move up to the "major league" Arena Football League, but nothing has come of those plans.

The northern part of the state lies across the Ohio River from Cincinnati, which is home to the National Football League's Cincinnati Bengals, Major League Baseball's Cincinnati Reds. It is not uncommon for fans to park in the city of Newport and use the Newport Southbank Pedestrian Bridge, locally known as the "Purple People Bridge", to walk to these games in Cincinnati. Georgetown College in Georgetown was the location for the Bengals' summer training camp, until it was announced in 2012 that the Bengals would no longer use the facilities.

As in many states, especially those without major league professional sports teams, college athletics are prominent. This is especially true of the state's three Division I Football Bowl Subdivision (FBS) programs, including the Kentucky Wildcats, the Western Kentucky Hilltoppers, and the Louisville Cardinals. The Wildcats, Hilltoppers, and Cardinals are among the most tradition-rich college men's basketball teams in the United States, combining for 11 National Championships and 24 NCAA Final Fours; all three are high on the lists of total all-time wins, wins per season, and average wins per season.

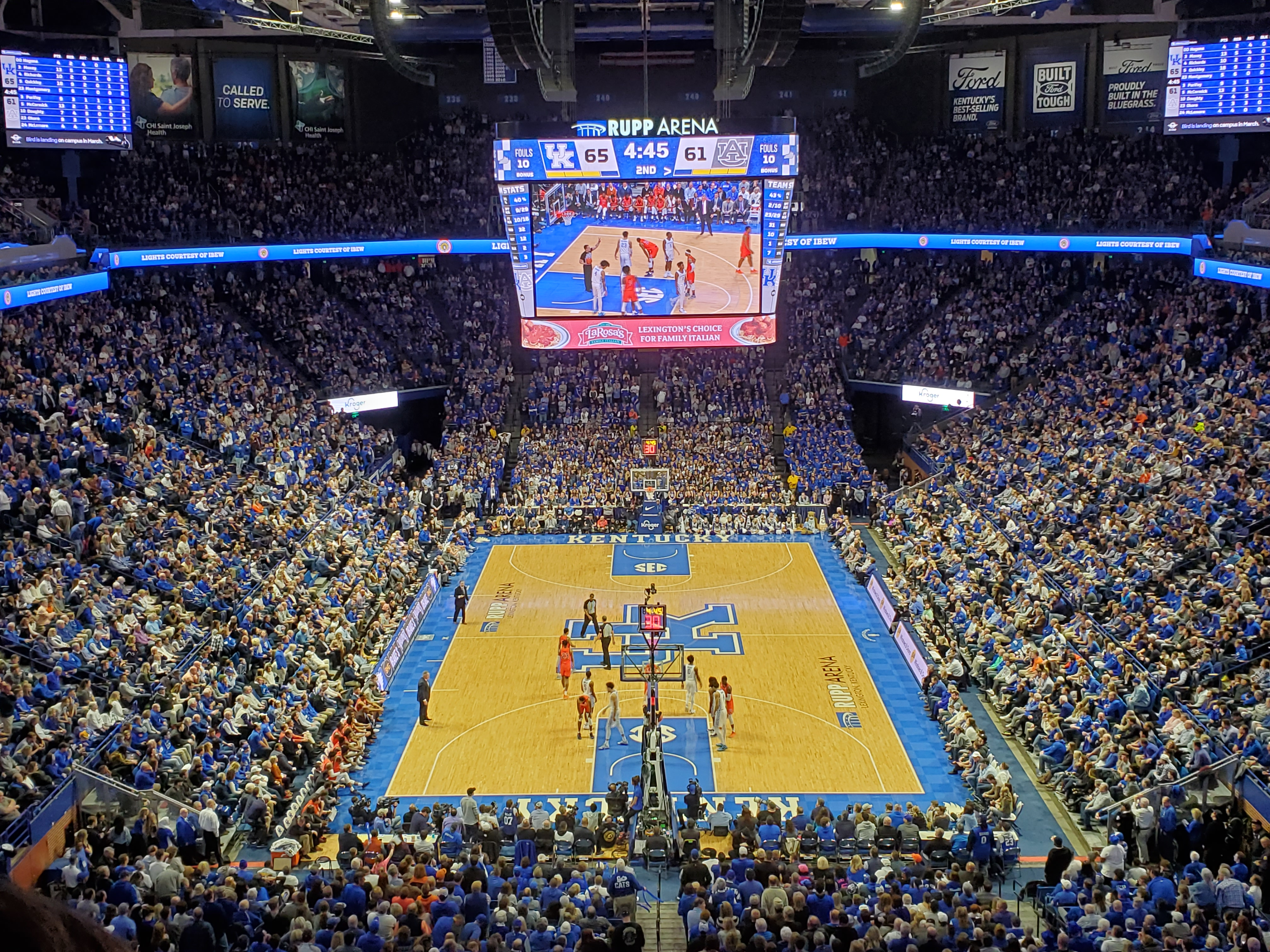
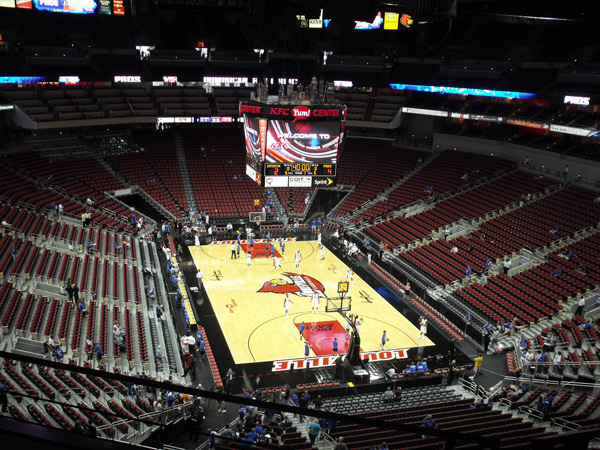
College Basketball enjoys significant popularity in Kentucky, with the University of Kentucky's Rupp Arena (left), and the University of Louisville's KFC Yum! Center (right) ranking 2nd and 3rd in capacity among college basketball arenas.

The Kentucky Wildcats are particularly notable, leading all Division I programs in all-time wins, win percentage, NCAA tournament appearances, and being second only to UCLA in NCAA championships. Louisville has stepped onto the football scene, including winning the 2007 Orange Bowl as well as the 2013 Sugar Bowl, and producing 2016 Heisman Trophy winner Lamar Jackson. Western Kentucky, the 2002 national champion in Division I-AA football (now Football Championship Subdivision (FCS)), completed its transition to Division I FBS football in 2009.

The Kentucky Derby is a horse race held annually in Louisville on the first Saturday in May. The Valhalla Golf Club in Louisville has hosted several editions of the PGA Championship, Senior PGA Championship and Ryder Cup since the 1990s.

The NASCAR Cup Series held a race at the Kentucky Speedway in Sparta, Kentucky from 2011 to 2020. The NASCAR Nationwide Series and the Camping World Truck Series raced there through 2020. The IndyCar Series previously raced there as well.

Ohio Valley Wrestling in Louisville was the primary location for training and rehab for WWE professional wrestlers from 2000 until 2008, when WWE moved its contracted talent to Florida Championship Wrestling. OVW later became the primary developmental territory for Total Nonstop Action Wrestling (TNA) from 2011 to 2013.

In 2014 Louisville City FC, a professional soccer team in the league then known as USL Pro and now as the United Soccer League, was announced. The team made its debut in 2015, playing home games at Louisville Slugger Field. In its first season, Louisville City was the official reserve side for Orlando City SC, who made its debut in Major League Soccer at the same time. That arrangement ended in 2016 when Orlando City established a directly controlled reserve side in the USL. In 2021, Lexington SC was founded as a professional soccer team out of Lexington, competing in USL League One. They played their home games at Toyota Stadium until construction on Lexington SC Stadium was completed in 2024. In 2025, they joined the USL Championship league. The club has companion women's teams that compete in the USL W League and USL Super League.

=== Kentucky colonel ===
The distinction of being named a Kentucky colonel is the highest title of honor bestowed by the Commonwealth of Kentucky. Commissions for Kentucky colonels are given by the Governor and the Secretary of State to individuals in recognition of noteworthy accomplishments and outstanding service to a community, state or the nation. The sitting governor of the Commonwealth of Kentucky bestows the honor of a colonel's commission, by issuance of letters patent. Kentucky colonels are commissioned for life and act officially as the state's goodwill ambassadors.

== See also ==
- Hatfield–McCoy feud
- Index of Kentucky-related articles
- Outline of Kentucky
- USS Kentucky, three ships

== Bibliography ==
=== Politics ===
- Miller, Penny M. Kentucky Politics & Government: Do We Stand United? (1994)
- Jewell, Malcolm E. and Everett W. Cunningham, Kentucky Politics (1968).

=== History ===
==== Surveys and reference ====
- Bodley, Temple and Samuel M. Wilson. History of Kentucky 4 vols. (1928).
- Caudill, Harry M., Night Comes to the Cumberlands (1963). ISBN 0-316-13212-8
- Channing, Steven. Kentucky: A Bicentennial History (1977).
- Clark, Thomas Dionysius. A History of Kentucky (many editions, 1937–1992).
- Collins, Lewis. History of Kentucky (1880).
- Gunther, John (1947). "Romance and Reality in Kentucky". Inside U.S.A. New York, London: Harper & Brothers. pp. 640–652.
- Harrison, Lowell H. and James C. Klotter. A New History of Kentucky (1997).
- Kleber, John E. et al. The Kentucky Encyclopedia (1992), standard reference history. ISBN 0-8131-1772-0
- Klotter, James C. Our Kentucky: A Study of the Bluegrass State (2000), high school text
- Lucas, Marion Brunson and Wright, George C. A History of Blacks in Kentucky 2 vols. (1992).
- World-Wide Web Resources – Notable Kentucky African Americans
- Share, Allen J. Cities in the Commonwealth: Two Centuries of Urban Life in Kentucky (1982).
- Wallis, Frederick A. and Hambleton Tapp. A Sesqui-Centennial History of Kentucky 4 vols. (1945).
- Ward, William S., A Literary History of Kentucky (1988) (ISBN 0-87049-578-X).
- WPA, Kentucky: A Guide to the Bluegrass State (1939); classic guide from the Federal Writers Project; covers main themes and every town online
- Yater, George H. (1987). Two Hundred Years at the Fall of the Ohio: A History of Louisville and Jefferson County (2nd ed.). Filson Club, Incorporated. ISBN 978-0-9601072-3-0.

==== Specialized scholarly studies ====
- Bakeless, John. Daniel Boone, Master of the Wilderness (1989)
- Blakey, George T. Hard Times and New Deal in Kentucky, 1929–1939 (1986)
- Coulter, E. Merton. The Civil War and Readjustment in Kentucky (1926)
- Davis, Alice. "Heroes: Kentucky's Artists from Statehood to the New Millennium" (2004)
- Ellis, William E. The Kentucky River (2000).
- Faragher, John Mack. Daniel Boone (1993)
- Fenton, John H. (1957). Politics in the Border States: A Study of the Patterns of Political Organization, and Political Change, Common to the Border States: Maryland, West Virginia, Kentucky, and Missouri. Archived from the original on August 3, 2020 – via Questia.
- Harlow, Luke E. Religion, Race, and the Making of Confederate Kentucky, 1830–1880. New York: Cambridge University Press, 2014.
- Ireland, Robert M. The County in Kentucky History (1976)
- Klotter, James C.; Harrison, Lowell; Ramage, James; Roland, Charles; Taylor, Richard; Bush, Bryan S; Fugate, Tom; Hibbs, Dixie; Matthews, Lisa; Moody, Robert C.; Myers, Marshall; Sanders, Stuart; McBride, Stephen (2005). Rose, Jerlene (ed.). Kentucky's Civil War 1861–1865. Clay City, Kentucky: Back Home in Kentucky, Inc. ISBN 978-0-9769231-1-4.
- Kelly, Andrew, Ed. "Kentucky by Design: The Decorative Arts and American Culture". Lexington, University Press of Kentucky, 2015. ISBN 978-0-8131-5567-8
- Klotter, James C. Kentucky: Portrait in Paradox, 1900–1950 (1992)
- Pearce, John Ed. Divide and Dissent: Kentucky Politics, 1930–1963 (1987)
- Remini, Robert V. Henry Clay: Statesman for the Union (1991).
- Sonne, Niels Henry (1939). Liberal Kentucky, 1780–1828. Archived from the original on August 2, 2020 – via Questia.
- Tapp, Hambleton and James C. Klotter. Kentucky Decades of Discord, 1865–1900 (1977)
- Townsend, William H. (1955). Lincoln and the Bluegrass: Slavery and Civil War in Kentucky. Archived from the original on September 25, 2020 – via Questia.
- Waldrep, Christopher (1993). Night Riders: Defending Community in the Black Patch, 1890–1915. Archived from the original on June 5, 2013 – via Questia.

Preceded by Vermont	List of U.S. states by date of admission to the Union; Admitted on June 1, 1792 (15th)	Succeeded by Tennessee
