= Geography of Kentucky =

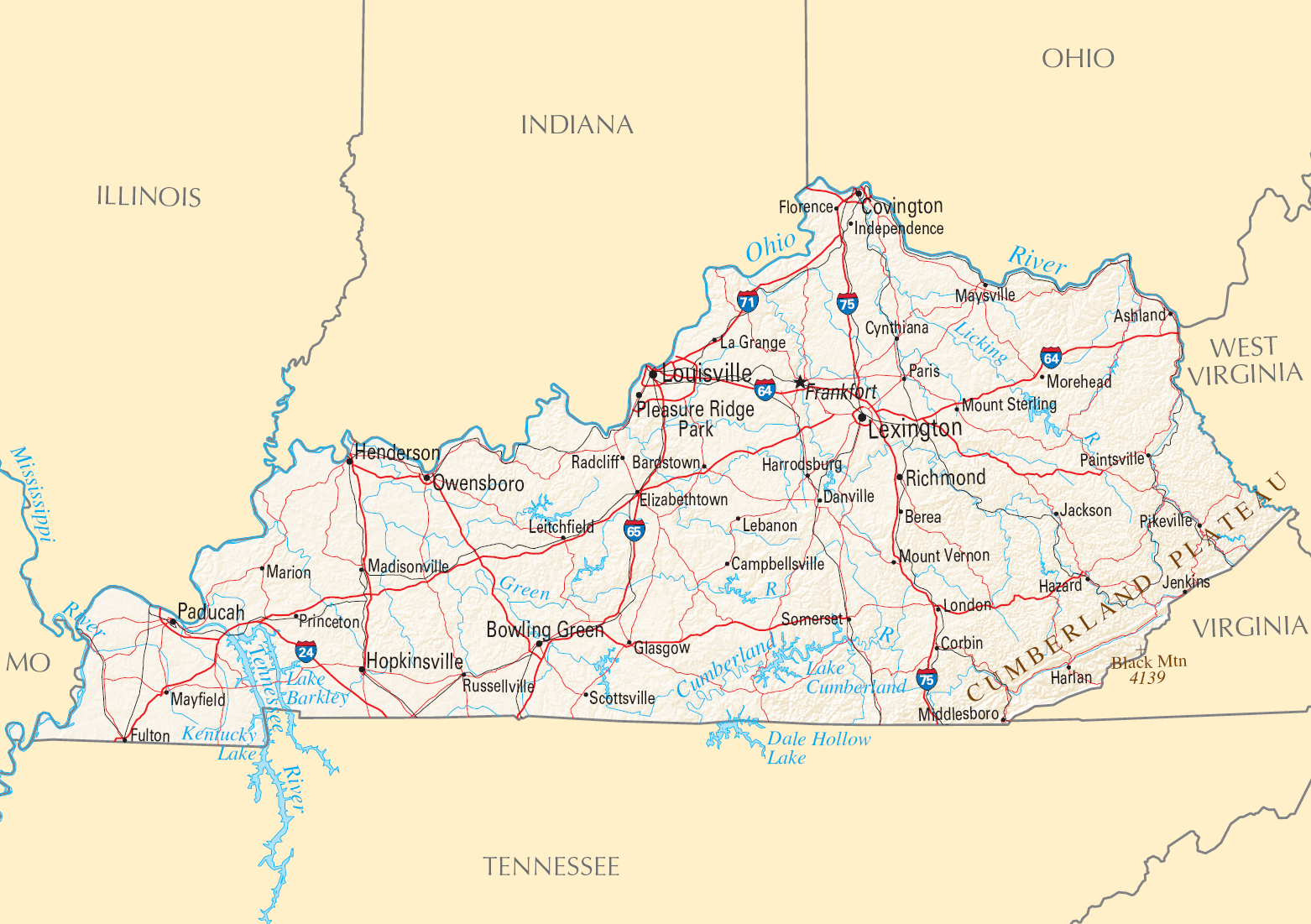
A map of Kentucky

Kentucky is situated in the Upland South region of the United States. A significant portion of eastern Kentucky is part of Appalachia.

Kentucky borders seven states, from the Midwest and the Southeast. West Virginia lies to the northeast, Virginia to the east, Tennessee to the south, Missouri to the west, Illinois to the northwest, and Indiana and Ohio to the north. Only Missouri and Tennessee, both of which border eight states, touch more.

Kentucky's northern border is formed by the Ohio River and its western border by the Mississippi River; however, the official border is based on the courses of the rivers as they existed when Kentucky became a state in 1792. For instance, northbound travelers on U.S. 41 from Henderson, after crossing the Ohio River, will be in Kentucky for about two miles (3.2 km). Ellis Park, a thoroughbred racetrack, is located in this small piece of Kentucky. Waterworks Road is part of the only land border between Indiana and Kentucky.

Kentucky has a non-contiguous part known as Kentucky Bend, at the far west corner of the state. It exists as an exclave surrounded completely by Missouri and Tennessee, and is included in the boundaries of Fulton County. Road access to this small part of Kentucky on the Mississippi River (populated by 18 people as of 2010) requires a trip through Tennessee.

The epicenter of the 1811–12 New Madrid earthquakes was near this area, causing the Mississippi River to flow backwards in some places. Though the series of quakes changed the area geologically and affected the small number of inhabitants of the area at the time, the Kentucky Bend is the result of a surveying error, not the New Madrid earthquake.

== Regions ==
Kentucky's regions (click on image for color-coding information)

Kentucky can be divided into five primary regions: the Cumberland Plateau in the east, which contains much of the historic coal mines; the north-central Bluegrass region, where the major cities and the state capital (Frankfort) are located; the south-central and western Pennyroyal Plateau (also known as the Pennyrile or Mississippi Plateau); the Western Coal Fields; and the far-west Jackson Purchase.

The Bluegrass region is commonly divided into two regions, the Inner Bluegrass encircling 90 miles (140 km) around Lexington, and the Outer Bluegrass that contains most of the northern portion of the state, above the Knobs. Much of the outer Bluegrass is in the Eden Shale Hills area, made up of short, steep, and very narrow hills.

== Climate ==
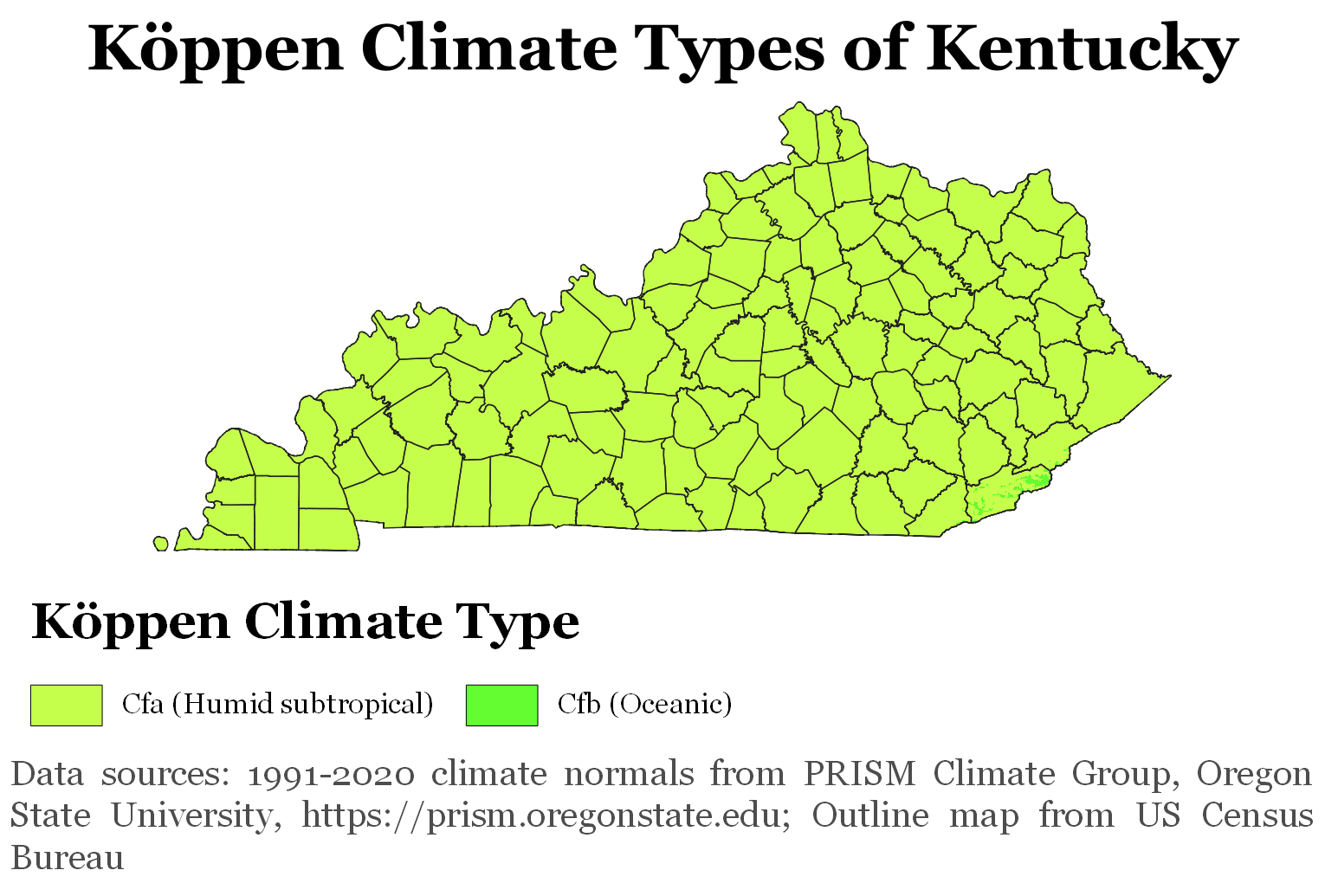
Köppen climate types of Kentucky, using 1991–2020 climate normals.

Located within the southeastern interior portion of North America, Kentucky has a climate that is best described as a humid subtropical climate (Köppen: Cfa), only small higher areas of the southeast of the state has an oceanic climate (Cfb) influenced by the Appalachians. Temperatures in Kentucky usually range from daytime summer highs of 87 °F (31 °C) to the winter low of 23 °F (−5 °C). The average precipitation is 46 inches (1,200 mm) a year. Kentucky has four distinct seasons, with substantial variations in the severity of summer and winter. The highest recorded temperature was 114 °F (46 °C) at Greensburg on July 28, 1930, while the lowest recorded temperature was −37 °F (−38 °C) at Shelbyville on January 19, 1994. The state rarely experiences the extreme cold of far northern states, nor the high heat of the states in the Deep South. Temperatures seldom drop below 0 degrees or rise above 100 degrees. Rain and snowfall totals about 45 inches per year.

The climate varies markedly within the state. The northern parts tend to be about five degrees cooler than those in the western parts of the state. Somerset in the south-central part receives ten more inches of rain per year than, for instance, Covington to the north. Average temperatures for the entire Commonwealth range from the low 30s in January to the high 70s in mid-July. The annual average temperature varies from 55 to 60 °F (13 to 16 °C): of 55 °F (13 °C) in the far north as an average annual temperature and of 60 °F (16 °C) in the extreme southwest.

In general, Kentucky has relatively hot, humid, rainy summers, and moderately cold and rainy winters. Mean maximum temperatures in July vary from 83 to 90 °F (28 to 32 °C); the mean minimum July temperatures are 61 to 69 °F (16 to 21 °C). In January the mean maximum temperatures range from 36 to 44 °F (2 to 7 °C); the mean minimum temperatures range from 19 to 26 °F (−7 to −3 °C). Temperature means vary with northern and far-eastern mountain regions averaging five degrees cooler year-round, compared to the relatively warmer areas of the southern and western regions of the state. Precipitation also varies north to south with the north averaging of 38 to 40 inches (970 to 1,020 mm), and the south averaging of 50 inches (1,300 mm). Days per year below the freezing point vary from about sixty days in the southwest to more than a hundred days in the far-north and far-east.

=== Climate data ===
Monthly average high and low temperatures for various Kentucky cities ( °F)
City	Jan	Feb	Mar	Apr	May	Jun	Jul	Aug	Sep	Oct	Nov	Dec
Lexington	40.9/24.8	45.5/27.9	55.3/35.4	65.7/44.7	74.3/54.2	82.8/62.7	86.1/66.5	85.6/65.2	78.8/57.6	67.5/46.6	55.4/37.2	43.9/28
Louisville	43/26.8	47.8/29.9	57.9/37.8	68.8/47.3	77.1/57	85.3/66	88.7/69.9	88.3/68.5	81.5/60.5	70.1/48.9	57.9/39.5	45.8/30
Owensboro	41.2/23.2	46.6/26.8	58.3/36.7	69.3/45.9	78.1/54.5	86.4/62.8	89.2/66.6	88.2/64.4	82.4/58.3	71.6/45.7	58.1/37.4	45.9/28.2
Paducah	43.4/25.8	48.9/29.5	59/37.7	69.4/46.6	78/56.3	86.2/64.9	89.3/68.5	89/66.1	82.1/57.8	71/46.7	58.4/37.9	46.3/28.6
Pikeville	44/23	50/25	60/32	69/39	77/49	84/58	87/63	86/62	80/56	71/42	60/33	49/26
Ashland	42/19	47/21	57/29	68/37	77/47	84/56	88/61	87/59	80/52	69/40	57/31	46/23
Bowling Green	45/26.4	50/29.6	59.8/37	69.7/45.6	77.8/55	86.1/63.9	89.4/67.9	88.9/66.1	82.1/58	71.2/46.3	59.4/37.5	47.9/29.2

Climate data for Louisville International Airport, Kentucky (1991–2020 normals, (Note: Mean monthly maxima and minima (i.e. the expected highest and lowest temperature readings at any point during the year or given month) calculated based on data at said location from 1991 to 2020.) extremes 1872–present (Note: Official records for Louisville were kept at the Weather Bureau Office from August 1872 to June 1945, Bowman Field from July 1945 to November 1947, Louisville Int'l from December 1947 to October 1995, the Weather Forecast Office (38.1150°N 85.6450°W) from November 1995 to December 2005, and again at Louisville Int'l since January 2006. For more information, see Threadex))
Month	Jan	Feb	Mar	Apr	May	Jun	Jul	Aug	Sep	Oct	Nov	Dec	Year
Record high °F (°C)	77 (25)	82 (28)	89 (32)	91 (33)	98 (37)	105 (41)	107 (42)	105 (41)	104 (40)	97 (36)	85 (29)	76 (24)	107 (42)
Mean maximum °F (°C)	65.2 (18.4)	70.4 (21.3)	77.8 (25.4)	84.1 (28.9)	89.0 (31.7)	93.6 (34.2)	95.7 (35.4)	95.6 (35.3)	92.9 (33.8)	85.4 (29.7)	75.1 (23.9)	67.0 (19.4)	97.3 (36.3)
Mean daily maximum °F (°C)	43.6 (6.4)	48.3 (9.1)	58.1 (14.5)	69.6 (20.9)	77.8 (25.4)	85.7 (29.8)	89.0 (31.7)	88.4 (31.3)	82.2 (27.9)	70.5 (21.4)	57.6 (14.2)	47.2 (8.4)	68.2 (20.1)
Daily mean °F (°C)	35.7 (2.1)	39.5 (4.2)	48.4 (9.1)	59.0 (15.0)	68.3 (20.2)	76.4 (24.7)	79.9 (26.6)	78.9 (26.1)	72.0 (22.2)	60.3 (15.7)	48.5 (9.2)	39.6 (4.2)	58.9 (14.9)
Mean daily minimum °F (°C)	27.8 (−2.3)	30.7 (−0.7)	38.6 (3.7)	48.5 (9.2)	58.7 (14.8)	67.2 (19.6)	70.8 (21.6)	69.5 (20.8)	61.9 (16.6)	50.1 (10.1)	39.4 (4.1)	32.1 (0.1)	49.6 (9.8)
Mean minimum °F (°C)	6.0 (−14.4)	11.4 (−11.4)	20.3 (−6.5)	31.7 (−0.2)	41.9 (5.5)	53.6 (12.0)	60.5 (15.8)	58.7 (14.8)	46.9 (8.3)	33.7 (0.9)	23.1 (−4.9)	13.0 (−10.6)	3.3 (−15.9)
Record low °F (°C)	−22 (−30)	−19 (−28)	−1 (−18)	21 (−6)	31 (−1)	42 (6)	49 (9)	45 (7)	33 (1)	23 (−5)	−1 (−18)	−15 (−26)	−22 (−30)
Average precipitation inches (mm)	3.39 (86)	3.41 (87)	4.60 (117)	4.80 (122)	5.18 (132)	4.27 (108)	4.05 (103)	3.71 (94)	3.66 (93)	3.72 (94)	3.42 (87)	4.13 (105)	48.34 (1,228)
Average snowfall inches (cm)	4.5 (11)	4.1 (10)	2.1 (5.3)	0.1 (0.25)	0.0 (0.0)	0.0 (0.0)	0.0 (0.0)	0.0 (0.0)	0.0 (0.0)	0.1 (0.25)	0.3 (0.76)	2.2 (5.6)	13.4 (34)
Average precipitation days (≥ 0.01 in)	11.2	10.4	12.1	11.9	12.6	10.5	10.2	8.2	7.9	7.9	9.8	11.8	124.5
Average snowy days (≥ 0.1 in)	3.7	3.7	1.7	0.1	0.0	0.0	0.0	0.0	0.0	0.0	0.6	2.5	12.3
Average relative humidity (%)	68.6	68.1	64.0	61.5	67.2	68.9	70.9	71.7	72.9	69.9	69.4	70.2	68.6
Mean monthly sunshine hours	140.5	148.9	188.6	221.1	263.4	288.9	293.6	272.6	234.3	208.5	135.7	118.3	2,514.4
Percentage possible sunshine	46	49	51	56	60	65	65	65	63	60	45	40	56
Average ultraviolet index	1.8	2.8	4.6	6.5	8.0	8.9	9.1	8.2	6.4	4.0	2.3	1.6	5.3
Source 1: NOAA (relative humidity and sun 1961–1990)
Source 2: UV Index Today (1995 to 2022)

Climate data for Lexington, Kentucky (Note: (Blue Grass Airport), 1991–2020 normals. Mean monthly maxima and minima (i.e. the expected highest and lowest temperature readings at any point during the year or given month) calculated based on data at said location from 1991 to 2020. Extremes 1872–present. Official records for Lexington were kept at the State College on South Limestone Street from October 1872 to July 1876 before closing, the Tower State College Building on the University of Kentucky campus from September 1888 to July 1915 after reopening downtown in 1887, various locations near downtown from July 1915 to July 1944, and Blue Grass Airport since July 1944. For more information, see .)
Month	Jan	Feb	Mar	Apr	May	Jun	Jul	Aug	Sep	Oct	Nov	Dec	Year
Record high °F (°C)	80 (27)	80 (27)	86 (30)	91 (33)	96 (36)	104 (40)	108 (42)	105 (41)	103 (39)	97 (36)	83 (28)	75 (24)	108 (42)
Mean maximum °F (°C)	64.2 (17.9)	68.4 (20.2)	75.0 (23.9)	81.6 (27.6)	87.2 (30.7)	92.0 (33.3)	93.9 (34.4)	93.4 (34.1)	90.9 (32.7)	83.6 (28.7)	73.5 (23.1)	65.6 (18.7)	95.9 (35.5)
Mean daily maximum °F (°C)	42.3 (5.7)	46.8 (8.2)	56.1 (13.4)	67.2 (19.6)	75.8 (24.3)	83.8 (28.8)	86.9 (30.5)	86.2 (30.1)	80.2 (26.8)	68.6 (20.3)	55.8 (13.2)	45.9 (7.7)	66.3 (19.1)
Daily mean °F (°C)	33.9 (1.1)	37.5 (3.1)	45.9 (7.7)	56.2 (13.4)	65.4 (18.6)	73.3 (22.9)	76.7 (24.8)	75.7 (24.3)	69.1 (20.6)	57.8 (14.3)	46.1 (7.8)	37.8 (3.2)	56.3 (13.5)
Mean daily minimum °F (°C)	25.4 (−3.7)	28.3 (−2.1)	35.8 (2.1)	45.2 (7.3)	55.0 (12.8)	62.8 (17.1)	66.5 (19.2)	65.2 (18.4)	58.1 (14.5)	47.0 (8.3)	36.4 (2.4)	29.6 (−1.3)	46.3 (7.9)
Mean minimum °F (°C)	3.5 (−15.8)	7.8 (−13.4)	16.9 (−8.4)	28.1 (−2.2)	38.9 (3.8)	49.8 (9.9)	56.9 (13.8)	54.9 (12.7)	43.5 (6.4)	30.8 (−0.7)	20.2 (−6.6)	11.5 (−11.4)	0.3 (−17.6)
Record low °F (°C)	−21 (−29)	−20 (−29)	−2 (−19)	15 (−9)	26 (−3)	39 (4)	47 (8)	42 (6)	32 (0)	20 (−7)	−3 (−19)	−19 (−28)	−21 (−29)
Average precipitation inches (mm)	3.42 (87)	3.64 (92)	4.48 (114)	4.42 (112)	5.44 (138)	4.96 (126)	5.12 (130)	3.71 (94)	3.42 (87)	3.66 (93)	3.37 (86)	4.20 (107)	49.84 (1,266)
Average snowfall inches (cm)	4.7 (12)	4.5 (11)	2.8 (7.1)	0.2 (0.51)	0.0 (0.0)	0.0 (0.0)	0.0 (0.0)	0.0 (0.0)	0.0 (0.0)	0.0 (0.0)	0.4 (1.0)	1.9 (4.8)	14.5 (37)
Average precipitation days (≥ 0.01 in)	12.6	11.6	12.8	12.8	12.6	11.7	10.7	9.6	7.7	9.2	10.3	12.6	134.2
Average snowy days (≥ 0.1 in)	4.5	3.8	1.7	0.2	0.0	0.0	0.0	0.0	0.0	0.0	0.7	2.5	13.4
Source: NOAA

=== Natural disasters ===
Deadliest weather events in Kentucky history	Date	Death Toll	Affected Regions
March 1890 middle Mississippi Valley tornado outbreak	March 27, 1890	200+	Louisville, W KY
Gradyville flood	June 7, 1907	20	Gradyville
May–June 1917 tornado outbreak sequence	May 27, 1917	66	Fulton area
Early-May 1933 tornado outbreak sequence	May 9, 1933, Tornado	38	South Central KY
Ohio River flood of 1937	Early 1937	unknown	Statewide
April 3, 1974, tornado outbreak	April 3, 1974	72	Statewide
March 1, 1997, Flooding	Early March 1997	18	Statewide
Tornado outbreak sequence of May 2004	May 30, 2004	0	Jefferson County, KY
December 21–24, 2004 North American winter storm	December 21–24, 2004	unknown	Statewide
Widespread Flash Flooding	September 22–23, 2006	6	Statewide
January 2009 North American ice storm	January 26–28, 2009	35	Statewide
2009 Kentuckiana Flash Flood	August 4, 2009	36	Kentuckiana
Tornado outbreak of March 2–3, 2012	March 2, 2012	22	Statewide
Tornado outbreak of December 10–11, 2021	December 10–11, 2021	74	Kentucky, 5 other states
July–August 2022 United States floods	July 24–August 2, 2022	37	Kentucky, 5 other states

== Lakes and rivers ==
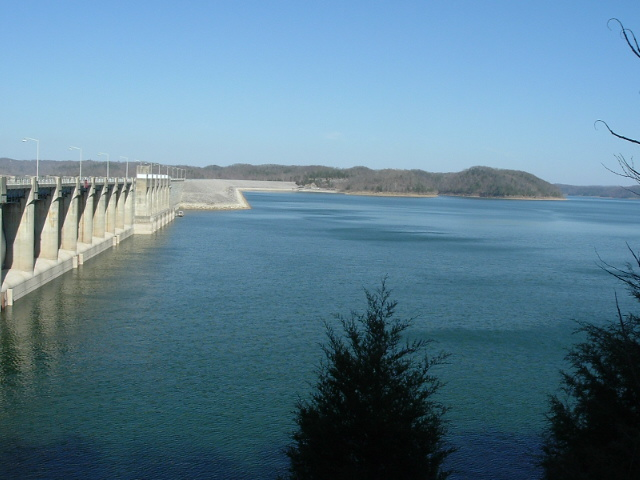
Lake Cumberland is the largest artificial American lake east of the Mississippi River by volume.

Kentucky has more navigable miles of water than any other state in the union, other than Alaska.

Kentucky is the only U.S. state to have a continuous border of rivers running along three of its sides – the Mississippi River to the west, the Ohio River to the north, and the Big Sandy River and Tug Fork to the east. Its major internal rivers include the Kentucky River, Tennessee River, Cumberland River, Green River and Licking River.

Though it has only three major natural lakes, Kentucky is home to many artificial lakes. Kentucky has both the largest artificial lake east of the Mississippi in water volume (Lake Cumberland) and surface area (Kentucky Lake). Kentucky Lake's 2,064 miles (3,322 km) of shoreline, 160,300 acres (64,900 hectares) of water surface, and 4,008,000 acre-feet (4.9 billion cubic meters) of flood storage are the most of any lake in the TVA system.

Kentucky's 90,000 miles (140,000 km) of streams provides one of the most expansive and complex stream systems in the nation.

== Natural environment and conservation ==
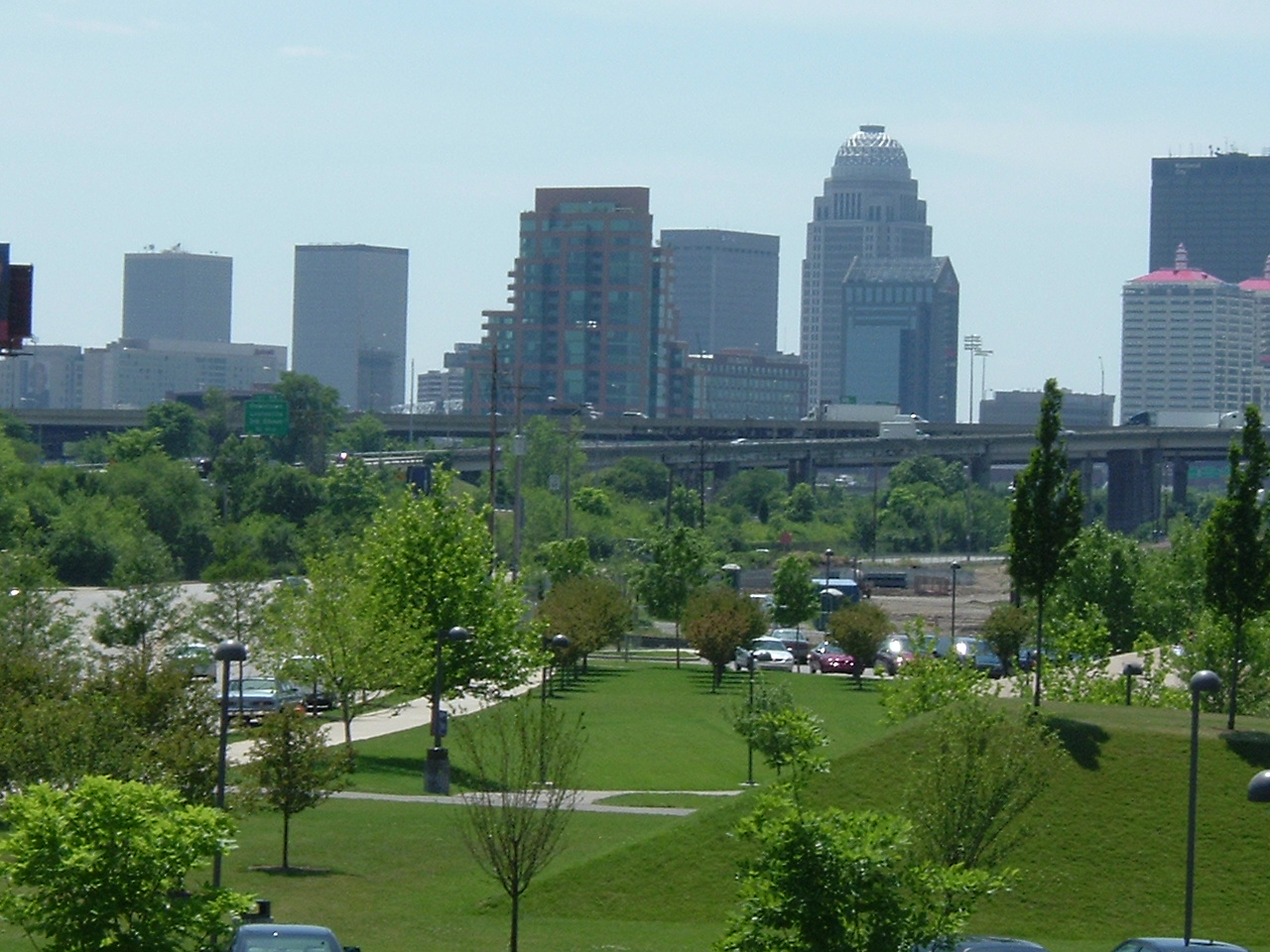
Once an industrial wasteland, Louisville's reclaimed waterfront now features thousands of trees and miles of walking trails.

Kentucky has an expansive park system, which includes one national park, two National Recreation Areas, two National Historic Parks, two national forests, two National Wildlife Refuges, 45 state parks, 37,896 acres (153 km^{2}) of state forest, and 82 wildlife management areas.

Kentucky has been part of two of the most successful wildlife reintroduction projects in United States history. In the winter of 1997, the Kentucky Department of Fish and Wildlife Resources began to re-stock elk in the state's eastern counties, which had been extinct from the area for over 150 years. As of 2009, the herd had reached the project goal of 10,000 animals, making it the largest herd east of the Mississippi River.

The state also stocked wild turkeys in the 1950s. There were reported to be fewer than 900 at one point. Once nearly extinct here, wild turkeys thrive throughout today's Kentucky. Hunters officially reported a record 29,006 birds taken during the 23-day season in spring 2009.

In 1991 the Land Between the Lakes partnered with the U.S. Fish and Wildlife Service for the Red Wolf Recovery Program, a captive breeding program.

=== Natural attractions ===
See also the 1939 WPA Guide to Kentucky.

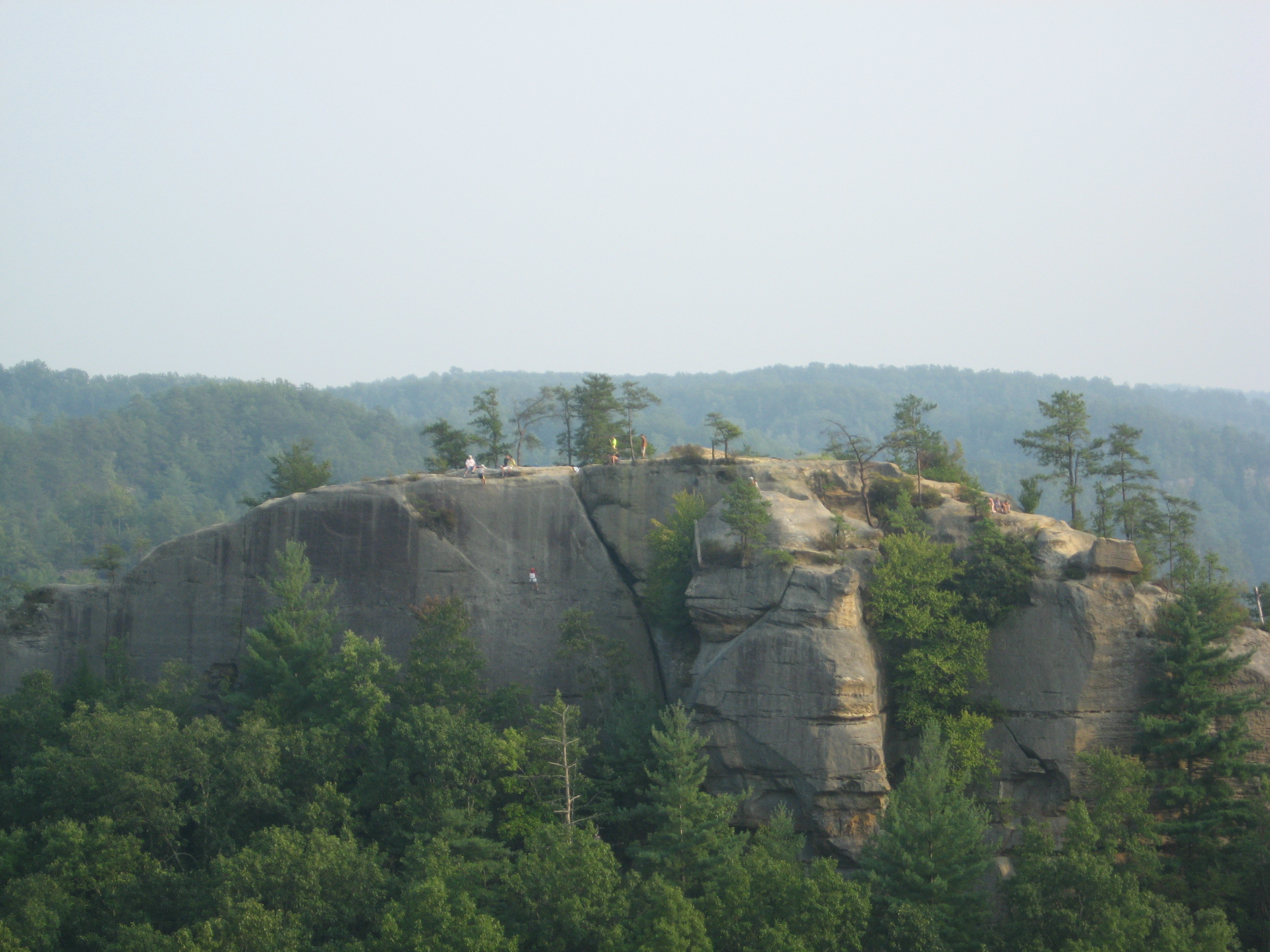
Red River Gorge is one of Kentucky's most visited places.

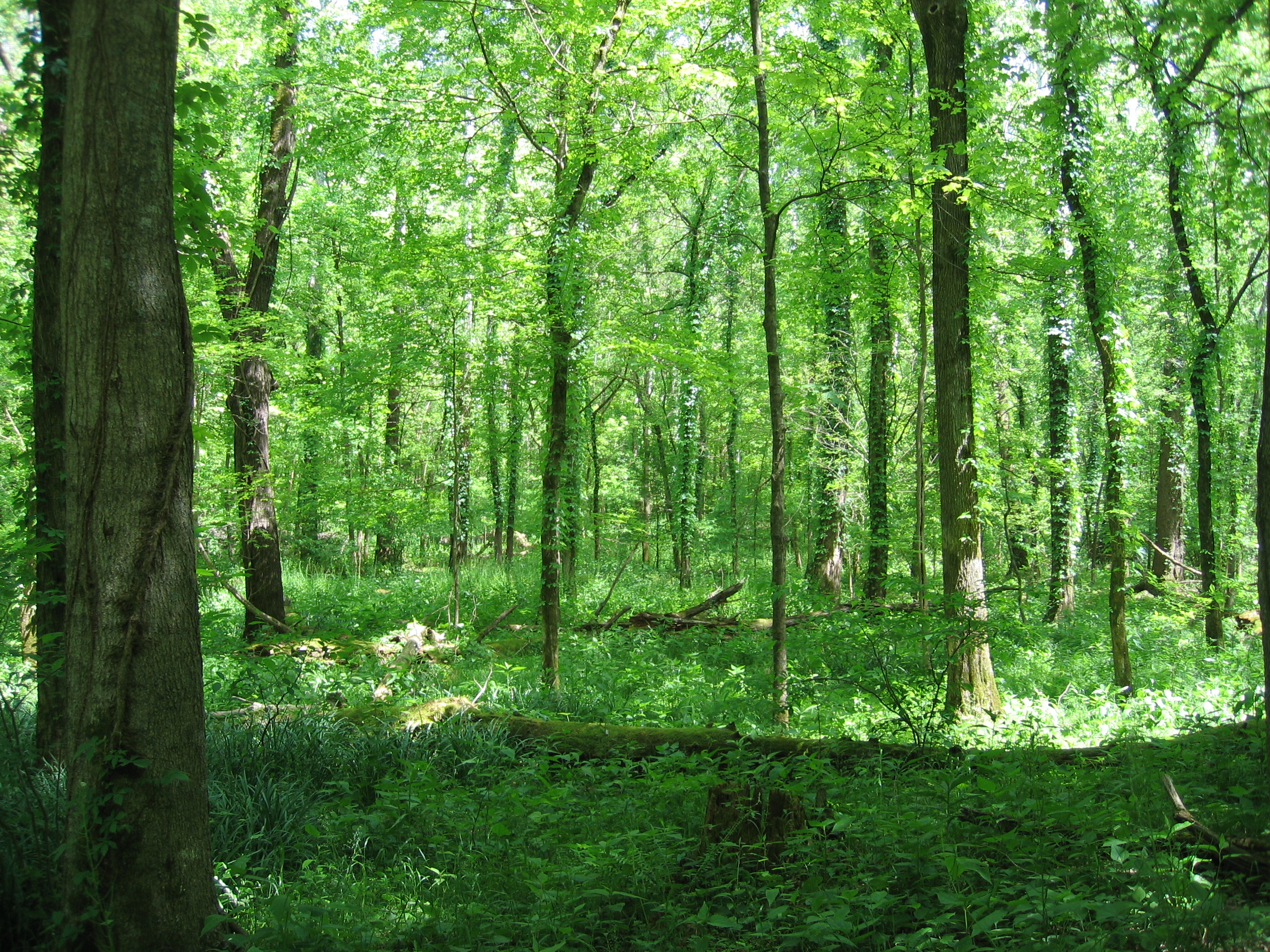
Forest at Otter Creek Outdoor Recreation Area, Meade County, Kentucky

- Cumberland Gap, chief passageway through the Appalachian Mountains in early American history.
- Cumberland Falls, the only place in the Western Hemisphere where a "moonbow" may be regularly seen, due to the spray of the falls.
- Mammoth Cave National Park, featuring the world's longest known cave system.
- Red River Gorge Geological Area, part of the Daniel Boone National Forest.
- Land Between the Lakes, a National Recreation Area managed by the United States Forest Service.
- Big South Fork National River and Recreation Area near Whitley City.
- Black Mountain, state's highest point. Runs along the south ridge of Pine Mountain in Letcher County, Kentucky. The highest point located in Harlan County.
- Bad Branch Falls State Nature Preserve, 2,639-acre (11 km^{2}) state nature preserve on southern slope of Pine Mountain in Letcher County. Includes one of the largest concentrations of rare and endangered species in the state, as well as a 60-foot (18 m) waterfall and a Kentucky Wild River.
- Jefferson Memorial Forest, located in the southern fringes of Louisville in the Knobs region, the largest municipally run forest in the United States.
- Lake Cumberland, 1,255 miles (2,020 km) of shoreline located in South Central Kentucky.
- Natural Bridge, located in Slade, Kentucky Powell County.
- Breaks Interstate Park, located in southeastern Pike County, Kentucky and Southwestern Virginia. The Breaks is commonly known as the "Grand Canyon of the South".

== See also ==
- List of counties in Kentucky
- Coal mining in Kentucky
