= List of Kentucky state forests =

The following state forests are in Kentucky.

Name (by alphabetical order)	Location (of main entrance)
Big Rivers Wildlife Management Area and State Forest	Union and Crittenden counties
Dewey Lake State Forest	Floyd County
Green River State Forest	Henderson County
Kentenia State Forest	Harlan County
Kentucky Ridge State Forest	Bell County
Knobs State Forest and Wildlife Management Area	Bullitt County
Marion County Wildlife Management Area and State Forest	Marion County
Marrowbone State Forest and Wildlife Management Area	Metcalfe and Cumberland counties
Olympia State Forest	Bath County
Pennyrile State Forest	Christian County
Rolleigh Peterson Educational Forest	Jefferson County
Tygarts State Forest	Carter County

== See also ==
- List of national forests of the United States
