= List of mountains in Kentucky =

This is a list of mountains in the U.S. state of Kentucky. This list is compiled from all of the GNIS features in Kentucky that are classified as a cliff, range, ridge, or summit, and are over 2,000 feet (610 m) in elevation.

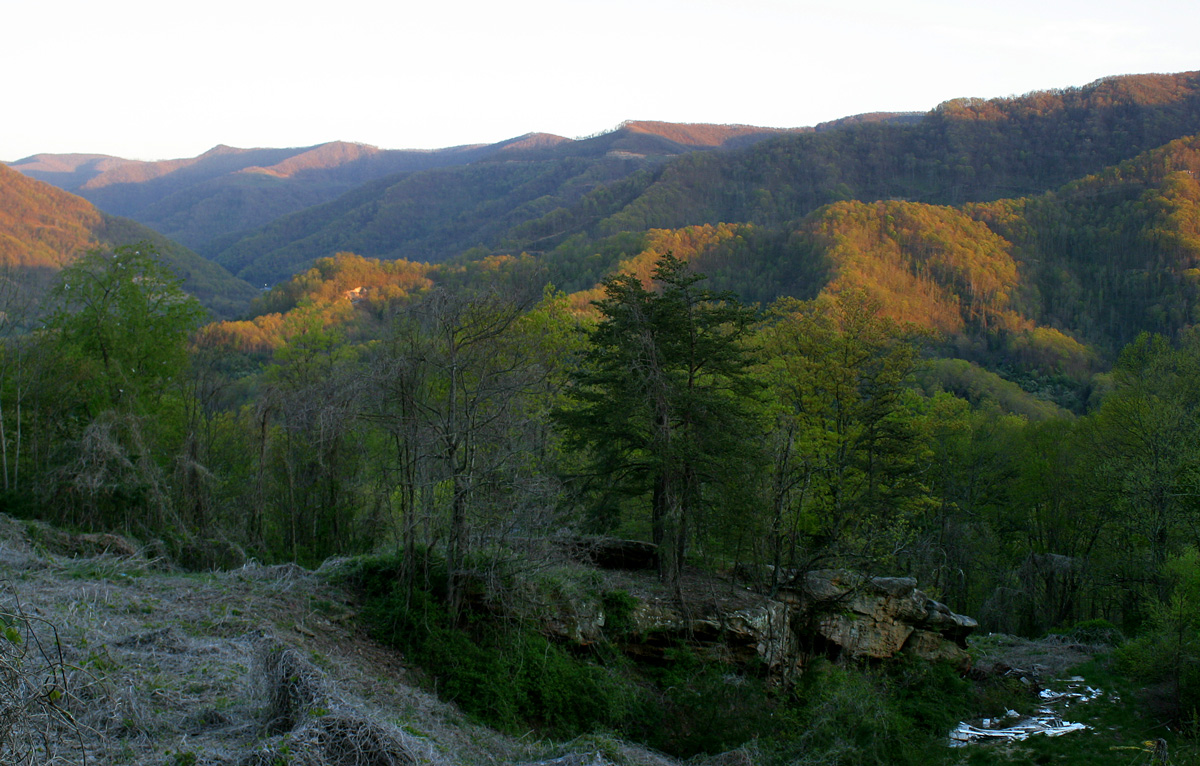
The Kentucky side of Black Mountain, the highest point in Kentucky

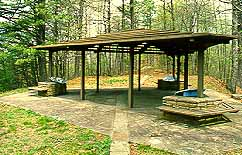
Summit of Tri-State peak

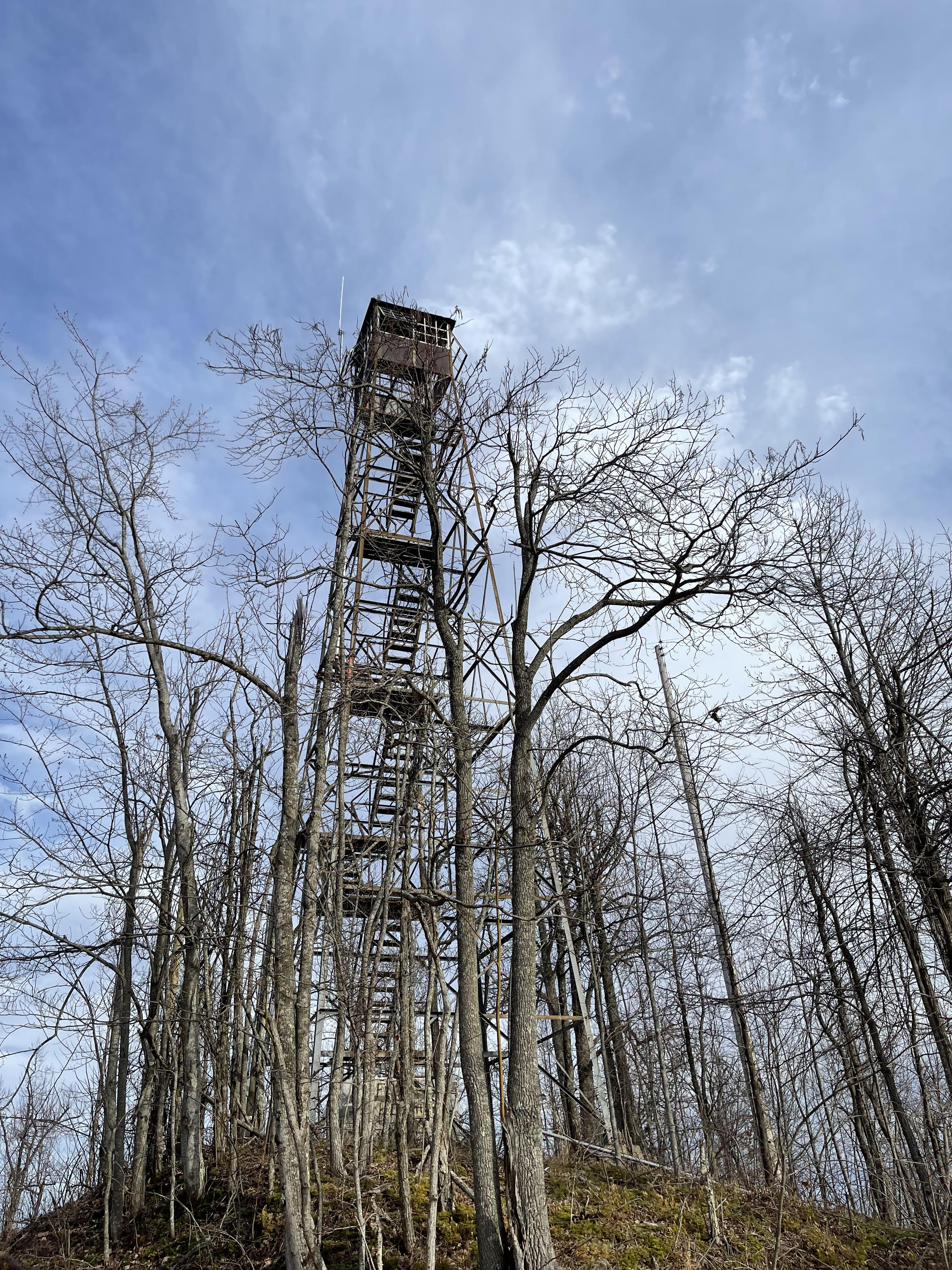
Photo of the decommissioned fire tower that sits atop of Stuffley Knob

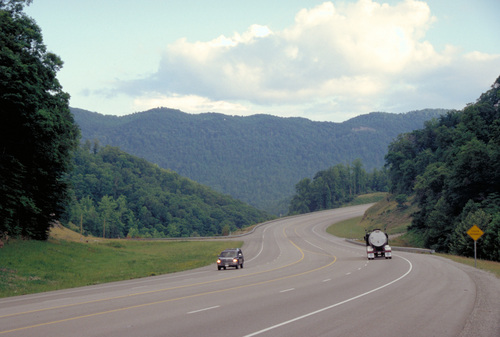
Pine Mountain viewed from US 23

== List of peaks above 2,000 feet ==
Name (GNIS)	County	Elevation	Coordinates
Black Mountain	Harlan	4,131 ft (1,259 m)	36°54′51″N 82°53′38″W
The Doubles	Harlan	4,091 ft (1,247 m)	36°54′29″N 82°52′39″W
Benham Spur	Harlan	4,045 ft (1,233 m)	36°55′04″N 82°54′10″W
Middle Ridge	Harlan	3,967 ft (1,209 m)	36°54′17″N 82°53′13″W
Big Ridge	Harlan	3,900 ft (1,200 m)	36°55′06″N 82°53′54″W
Rockhouse Ridge	Harlan	3,855 ft (1,175 m)	36°54′01″N 82°56′06″W
Looney Ridge	Harlan	3,812 ft (1,162 m)	36°54′05″N 82°52′05″W
Yellow Buck Spur	Harlan	3,802 ft (1,159 m)	36°54′07″N 82°55′58″W
Potato Hill	Harlan	3,688 ft (1,124 m)	36°53′13″N 82°53′16″W
Divide Ridge	Harlan	3,684 ft (1,123 m)	36°53′13″N 82°53′16″W
Sams Ridge	Letcher	3,573 ft (1,089 m)	36°58′49″N 82°51′45″W
Long Ridge	Harlan	3,510 ft (1,070 m)	36°55′01″N 83°02′37″W
Little Black Mountain	Harlan	3,488 ft (1,063 m)	36°53′46″N 82°52′35″W
Looney Ridge	Harlan	3,461 ft (1,055 m)	36°58′45″N 82°54′24″W
River Ridge	Letcher	3,422 ft (1,043 m)	37°01′19″N 82°48′57″W
White Rocks	Harlan	3,383 ft (1,031 m)	36°40′02″N 83°26′35″W
Cave Spur Ridge	Harlan	3,380 ft (1,030 m)	36°56′26″N 83°01′17″W
Kitts Knob	Harlan	3,360 ft (1,024 m)	36°49′15″N 83°10′57″W
Chunklick Spur	Harlan	3,350 ft (1,020 m)	36°44′41″N 83°23′26″W
Joe Knob	Harlan	3,337 ft (1,017 m)	36°55′40″N 83°05′35″W
Brush Mountain	Bell	3,333 ft (1,016 m)	36°39′45″N 83°33′05″W
Fox Knob	Harlan	3,327 ft (1,014 m)	36°48′01″N 83°22′37″W
Little Fork Ridge	Letcher	3,300 ft (1,000 m)	37°01′31″N 82°45′55″W
Pine Mountain	Letcher	3,274 ft (998 m)	37°06′18″N 82°44′42″W
Reynolds Mountain	Harlan	3,250 ft (990 m)	36°46′11″N 83°26′05″W
Crummies Spur	Harlan	3,212 ft (979 m)	36°49′04″N 83°12′56″W
Grays Knob	Harlan	3,212 ft (979 m)	36°47′16″N 83°17′28″W
Foresters Spur	Harlan	3,209 ft (978 m)	36°46′58″N 83°25′20″W
Puckett Ridge	Harlan	3,173 ft (967 m)	36°45′39″N 83°24′44″W
Ewing Spur	Harlan	3,159 ft (963 m)	36°47′54″N 83°22′20″W
Grays Ridge	Harlan	3,153 ft (961 m)	36°46′29″N 83°18′04″W
Cole Spur	Bell	3,146 ft (959 m)	36°38′32″N 83°50′24″W
Lone Spur	Harlan	3,127 ft (953 m)	36°48′03″N 83°09′54″W
Toms Spur	Harlan	3,127 ft (953 m)	36°45′26″N 83°24′49″W
Moseley Spur	Bell	3,123 ft (952 m)	36°38′18″N 83°49′31″W
White Oak Spur	Bell	3,123 ft (952 m)	36°35′50″N 83°47′49″W
Halls Butt	Letcher	3,097 ft (944 m)	37°01′56″N 82°48′50″W
Fork Ridge	Bell	3,094 ft (943 m)	36°35′49″N 83°47′47″W
Potato Hill Ridge	Harlan	3,091 ft (942 m)	36°46′12″N 83°21′41″W
Potato Knob	Harlan	3,091 ft (942 m)	36°46′12″N 83°21′41″W
Jones Spur	Bell	3,077 ft (938 m)	36°35′38″N 83°48′44″W
Canada Peak	Bell	3,068 ft (935 m)	36°38′48″N 83°45′46″W
Turner Spur	Bell	3,054 ft (931 m)	36°36′23″N 83°50′43″W
Double Spur	Harlan	3,038 ft (926 m)	36°44′53″N 83°19′15″W
Beans Spur	Bell	3,022 ft (921 m)	36°38′06″N 83°47′30″W
Skeet Rock Knob	Pike	3,012 ft (918 m)	37°15′36″N 82°23′00″W
Mill Spur	Harlan	2,976 ft (907 m)	36°43′09″N 83°28′19″W
Barn Ridge	Letcher	2,972 ft (906 m)	37°02′41″N 82°44′46″W
Maiden Ridge	Bell	2,972 ft (906 m)	36°37′06″N 83°51′07″W
Butterfly Knob	Harlan	2,940 ft (896 m)	36°42′51″N 83°25′58″W
Jackson Knob	Bell	2,933 ft (894 m)	36°44′43″N 83°31′37″W
Notch Rock	Harlan	2,920 ft (890 m)	36°44′22″N 83°11′16″W
Piney Spur	Bell	2,890 ft (880 m)	36°39′00″N 83°51′11″W
Catron Spur	Harlan	2,831 ft (863 m)	36°47′02″N 83°18′45″W
Brownies Ridge	Bell	2,818 ft (859 m)	36°42′32″N 83°29′04″W
Pine Spur	Bell	2,805 ft (855 m)	36°44′26″N 83°31′17″W
Yellow Rock	Harlan	2,805 ft (855 m)	36°44′31″N 83°09′12″W
High Rock	Letcher	2,776 ft (846 m)	37°06′04″N 82°45′34″W
Little Spur	Harlan	2,776 ft (846 m)	36°46′41″N 83°20′46″W
Gross Knob	Harlan	2,769 ft (844 m)	36°52′14″N 83°24′54″W
Sugarcamp Knob	Harlan	2,769 ft (844 m)	36°47′10″N 83°11′08″W
Skegg Knob	Pike	2,710 ft (826 m)	37°16′20″N 82°20′53″W
Jesse Spur	Harlan	2,612 ft (796 m)	36°47′39″N 83°25′51″W
Peters Knob	Harlan	2,612 ft (796 m)	36°53′29″N 83°26′59″W
English Spur	Harlan	2,608 ft (795 m)	36°53′22″N 83°14′20″W
Chestnut Knob	Leslie	2,602 ft (793 m)	36°54′31″N 83°24′14″W
Threemile Ridge	Pike	2,572 ft (784 m)	37°15′43″N 82°32′17″W
The Pinnacle	Bell	2,497 ft (761 m)	36°36′21″N 83°39′57″W
Kentucky Ridge	Leslie	2,490 ft (760 m)	36°54′51″N 83°24′48″W
Dicks Knob	Pike	2,490 ft (759 m)	37°30′04″N 82°13′39″W
Hylton Knob	Pike	2,484 ft (757 m)	37°25′20″N 82°09′48″W
Big Fork Ridge	Letcher	2,451 ft (747 m)	36°59′29″N 83°07′16″W
Sheep Cliff	Pike	2,415 ft (736 m)	37°17′05″N 82°30′25″W
Cranks Ridge	Harlan	2,411 ft (735 m)	36°46′00″N 83°13′15″W
Gray Mountain	Leslie	2,411 ft (735 m)	36°56′52″N 83°20′37″W
Hurricane Gap Mountain	Letcher	2,398 ft (731 m)	36°58′55″N 83°01′39″W
Jewell Ridge	Perry	2,372 ft (723 m)	37°02′22″N 83°04′30″W
High Knob	Pike	2,356 ft (718 m)	37°27′16″N 82°06′39″W
Hances Ridge	Bell	2,283 ft (696 m)	36°40′51″N 83°34′21″W
Flag Top	Bell	2,277 ft (694 m)	36°42′56″N 83°40′55″W
Potatoe Knob	Pike	2,267 ft (691 m)	37°15′44″N 82°40′51″W
Abner Mountain	Pike	2,205 ft (672 m)	37°21′12″N 82°38′49″W
Chestnut Flats	Bell	2,205 ft (672 m)	36°46′07″N 83°32′11″W
Potato Knob	Leslie	2,201 ft (671 m)	36°57′55″N 83°28′44″W
Sulphur Knob	Pike	2,200 ft (670 m)	37°28′31″N 82°07′06″W
Bear Wallow Mountain	Whitley	2,188 ft (667 m)	36°39′23″N 83°59′24″W
Collier Rocks	Pike	2,178 ft (664 m)	37°18′24″N 82°40′21″W
Dixon Knob	Perry	2,170 ft (660 m)	37°09′32″N 83°03′01″W
Fork Ridge	Knox	2,170 ft (660 m)	36°44′07″N 83°53′06″W
Kentucky Ridge	Clay	2,170 ft (660 m)	36°57′15″N 83°36′32″W
Ryans Creek Mountain	McCreary	2,170 ft (660 m)	36°39′18″N 84°18′21″W
Dark Ridge	Bell	2,162 ft (659 m)	36°38′53″N 83°41′26″W
Vanderpool Mountain	Whitley	2,159 ft (658 m)	36°38′49″N 84°00′58″W
Wolf Knob	Whitley	2,149 ft (655 m)	36°36′49″N 84°12′24″W
Anderson Mountain	McCreary	2,146 ft (654 m)	36°35′30″N 84°19′42″W
Mill Ridge	Harlan	2,146 ft (654 m)	36°48′00″N 83°13′50″W
Canada Mountain	Bell	2,129 ft (649 m)	36°40′09″N 83°42′27″W
Beaver Knob	Pike	2,126 ft (648 m)	37°20′46″N 82°17′06″W
Jellico Mountain	Whitley	2,126 ft (648 m)	36°41′31″N 84°12′32″W
Flag Ridge	Knox	2,123 ft (647 m)	36°43′22″N 83°52′37″W
Corner Tree Knob	McCreary	2,119 ft (646 m)	36°35′46″N 84°21′00″W
Signal Knob	Floyd	2,119 ft (646 m)	37°24′02″N 82°40′22″W
Hunt Knob	Pike	2,116 ft (645 m)	37°27′12″N 82°15′49″W
Rocky Face	Bell	2,113 ft (644 m)	36°41′38″N 83°40′32″W
Pinnacle Rock	Pike	2,103 ft (641 m)	37°16′52″N 82°21′17″W
Bob Lowe Knob	Harlan	2,096 ft (639 m)	36°48′58″N 83°28′44″W
Blue Head Rock	Pike	2,093 ft (638 m)	37°16′32″N 82°21′54″W
Trace Ridge	Bell	2,093 ft (638 m)	36°39′55″N 83°44′24″W
Cow Knob	Pike	2,090 ft (637 m)	37°32′13″N 82°14′20″W
The Three Knobs	Bell	2,090 ft (637 m)	36°53′06″N 83°38′09″W
Angel Mountain	McCreary	2,087 ft (636 m)	36°36′07″N 84°17′25″W
Card Mountain	Pike	2,087 ft (636 m)	37°22′02″N 82°16′46″W
Hampton Ridge	Bell	2,087 ft (636 m)	36°49′09″N 83°34′12″W
Bobs Spur	Harlan	2,083 ft (635 m)	36°46′17″N 83°16′28″W
Beaver Ridge	Pike	2,077 ft (633 m)	37°20′36″N 82°17′19″W
Gamblers Rock	Letcher	2,073 ft (632 m)	37°14′30″N 82°42′00″W
Pumpkin Knob	Bell	2,073 ft (632 m)	36°52′13″N 83°31′41″W
Log Mountains	Bell	2,070 ft (631 m)	36°37′28″N 83°49′39″W
Fate Lee Mountain	Whitley	2,057 ft (627 m)	36°38′01″N 84°14′47″W
Stephens Knob	McCreary	2,057 ft (627 m)	36°37′00″N 84°20′08″W
Silk Knob	Pike	2,051 ft (625 m)	37°32′58″N 82°14′22″W
Blackberry Mountain	Pike	2,011 ft (613 m)	37°34′45″N 82°12′31″W
Brushy Mountain	Whitley	2,008 ft (612 m)	36°41′30″N 83°54′12″W
Bon Jellico Mountain	Whitley	2,005 ft (611 m)	36°42′49″N 84°13′15″W
Boone Mountain	Pike	2,005 ft (611 m)	37°14′28″N 82°41′27″W
Patterson Mountain	Whitley	2,005 ft (611 m)	36°39′35″N 84°05′17″W
Round Mountain	Whitley	2,005 ft (611 m)	36°40′14″N 83°56′25″W

== See also ==
- Geography of Kentucky
