= Jefferson Memorial Forest =

Urban forest in Louisville, Kentucky, US

- Jefferson County Memorial Forest
- IUCN category IV (habitat/species management area)
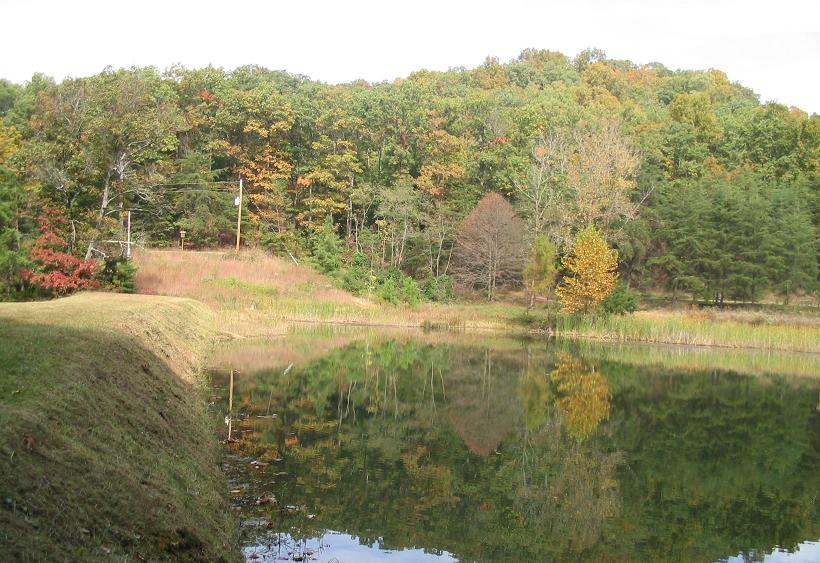

- Location within Kentucky Location within the United States
- Interactive map of Jefferson Memorial Forest
- Location: Southwest Louisville, Kentucky, US (in Kentucky's Knobs region)
- Coordinates: 38.06420°N 85.80640°W
- Area: 6,676 acres (27.02 km^{2})
- Established: August 1945; 80 years ago (dedicated October 10, 1948)
- Operator: Louisville Metro Parks
- Website: wildernesslouisville.org

Jefferson Memorial Forest is a forest located in southwest Louisville, Kentucky, in the Knobs region of Kentucky. At 6,676 acres (27.02 km^{2}), it is one of the largest municipal urban forests in the United States.

The forest was established as a tribute to area war dead but ultimately this was extended to all U.S. veterans. It is managed by Louisville Metro Parks. In 1975, the forest was designated a National Audubon Society Wildlife Refuge. Large portions of the forest are protected as nature preserves or under conservation easements, including swaths of mature woodlands.

== History ==
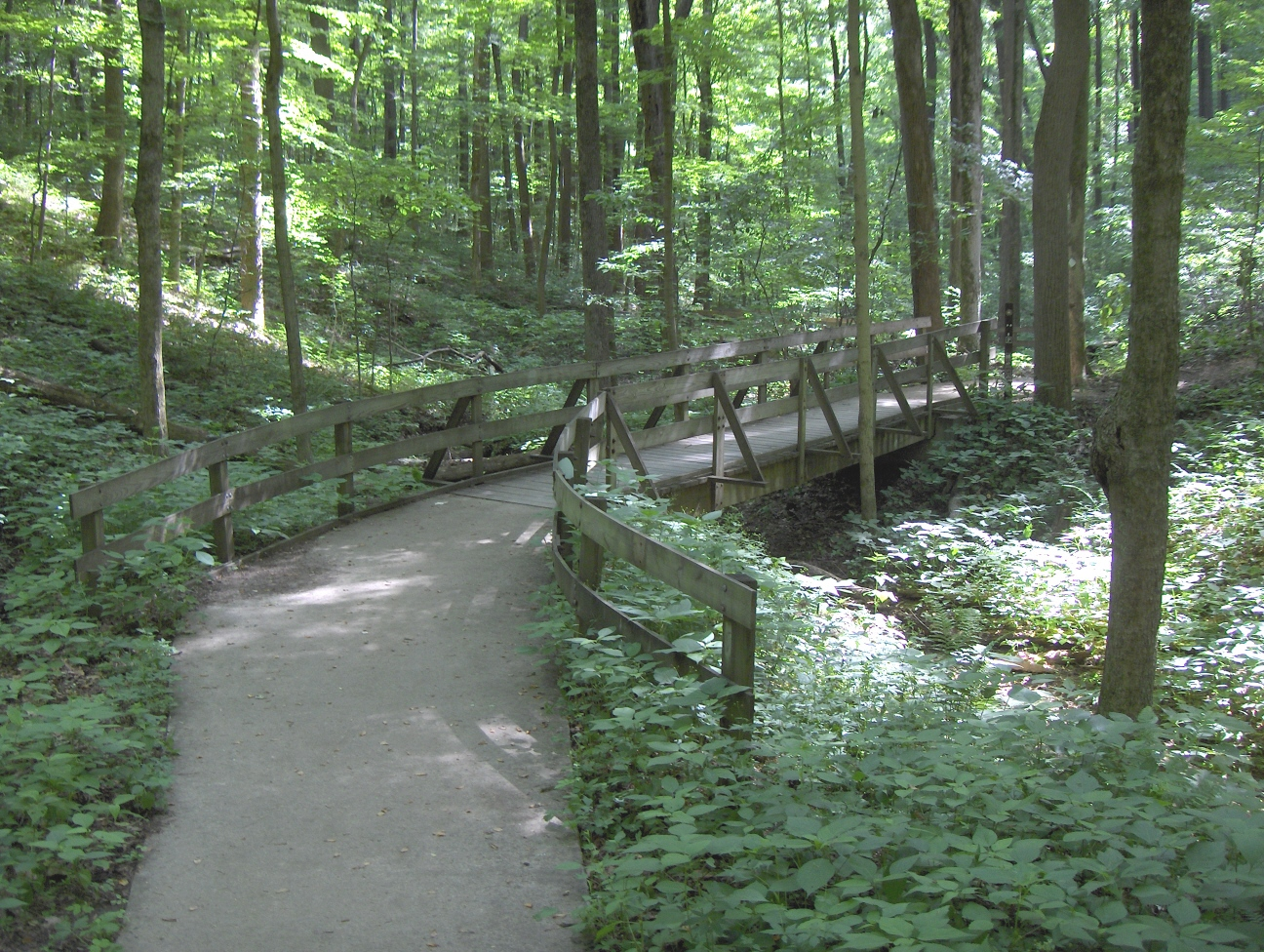
On Jefferson Memorial Forest's Tulip Tree Trail

In August 1945, Jefferson County, Kentucky, commenced the effort to establish a forest preserve in the southwestern part of the county. Dedicated October 10, 1948, Jefferson County Memorial Forest was named as a memorial to the area's World War II dead. Since then, the forest has been redesignated to remember all who served in the armed forces.

The original land purchases were guided by Paul Yost, who was appointed as the county forester. 1,300 acres (5.3 km^{2}) were secured by the time of dedication, and through 1954, an additional 400 acres (1.6 km^{2}) were acquired. The next significant acquisitions occurred from 1979 through the end of the 1980s, when the forest expanded to 5,000 acres (20 km^{2}). During this period, due to the efforts of U.S. Senator Mitch McConnell, then the Jefferson County Judge/Executive (1977–1984), the forest doubled in size. Since the 1980s, acquisition has proceeded slowly.

On October 4, 1975, Elvis Stahr, president of the National Audubon Society, officially declared the forest a National Audubon Wildlife Refuge. At the time, then-Louisville mayor Harvey I. Sloane contrasted the serenity of the forest with the bustle of the nearby city and continued: "This is a tremendous asset for the city and county ... and the cooperation here of federal government, the society and local government is unique."

In 1994, the Mitchell Hill School, a former country schoolhouse built in 1915, was renovated as a visitor and welcome center.

On May 28, 1996, thousand of forest trees were downed by a tornado, which caused several trails to be temporarily closed. The damage was compared to what occurred in Cherokee Park during the 1974 Super Outbreak.

== Geography and geology ==
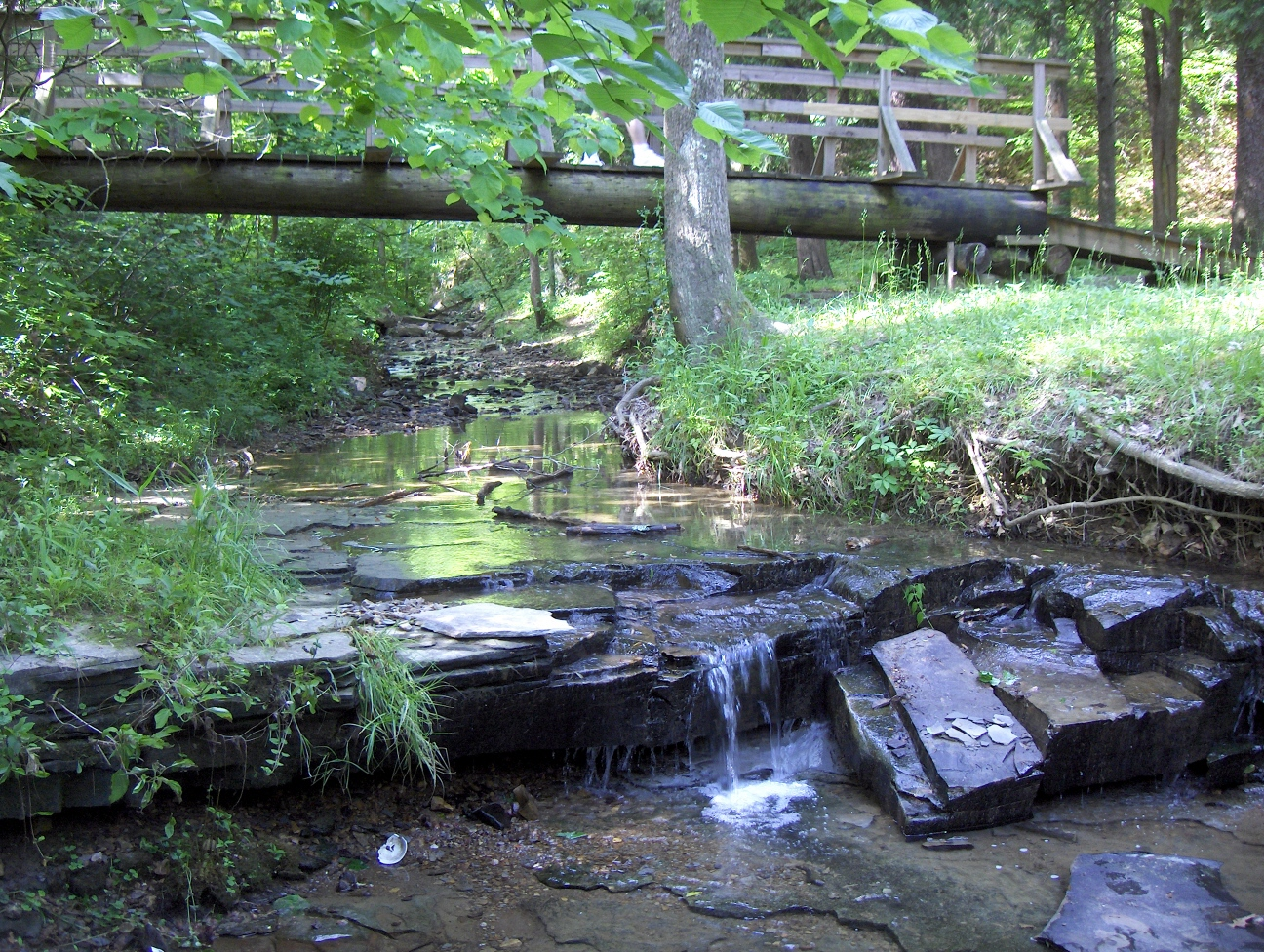
Bee Lick Creek

The forest is located in the Knobs region of Kentucky, also known as the Muldraugh Escarpment. This is a belt of rugged hills lying between the Bluegrass and the Pennyrile regions. The underlying geology of these hills is primarily siltstone and shale, with the siltstone creating extremely steep hillsides. The most important of these in the forest area is the Holtzclaw Siltstone, named after Holsclaw Hill.

Waterways throughout the forest, many of which are intermittent, serve as headwater streams to nearby Pond Creek. A 2026 master plan for the forest described it as having "one of the region's most intact headwater systems," including forested wetlands, supporting diverse habitat for crayfish, salamanders, macroinvertebrates and other species.

== Flora and fauna ==
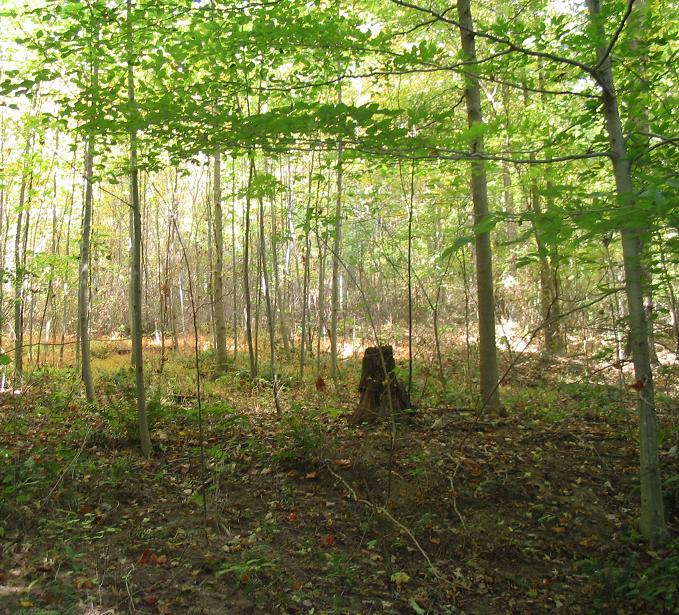
The forest is home to numerous wild plants and animals.

There are some fifty types of trees, including ten species of oaks, and a rich flora of wildflowers and seventeen species of ferns and fern allies. More than half of the forest, nearly 4,000 acres, has potential to be interior forest, according to the 2026 assessment.

A wide variety of animals can be seen, including bobcats, coyotes, red foxes, white-tailed deer, great blue herons and horned owls. The forest straddles the Mississippi Flyway and Atlantic Flyway, offering stopover habitat for migratory birds. Some species listed for protection by state or federal authorities also occur in the forest, including the northern long-eared bat, northern oak hairstreak butterfly, Kirtland's snake, and the Louisville crayfish.

Like many other natural areas in the eastern United States, the forest has a significant problem with invasive exotics, including tree-of-heaven (Ailanthus altissima), autumn olive (Eleagnus umbellata), Amur honeysuckle (Lonicera maackii), Japanese honeysuckle (Lonicera japonica), and princess tree (Paulownia tomentosa).

== Facilities ==
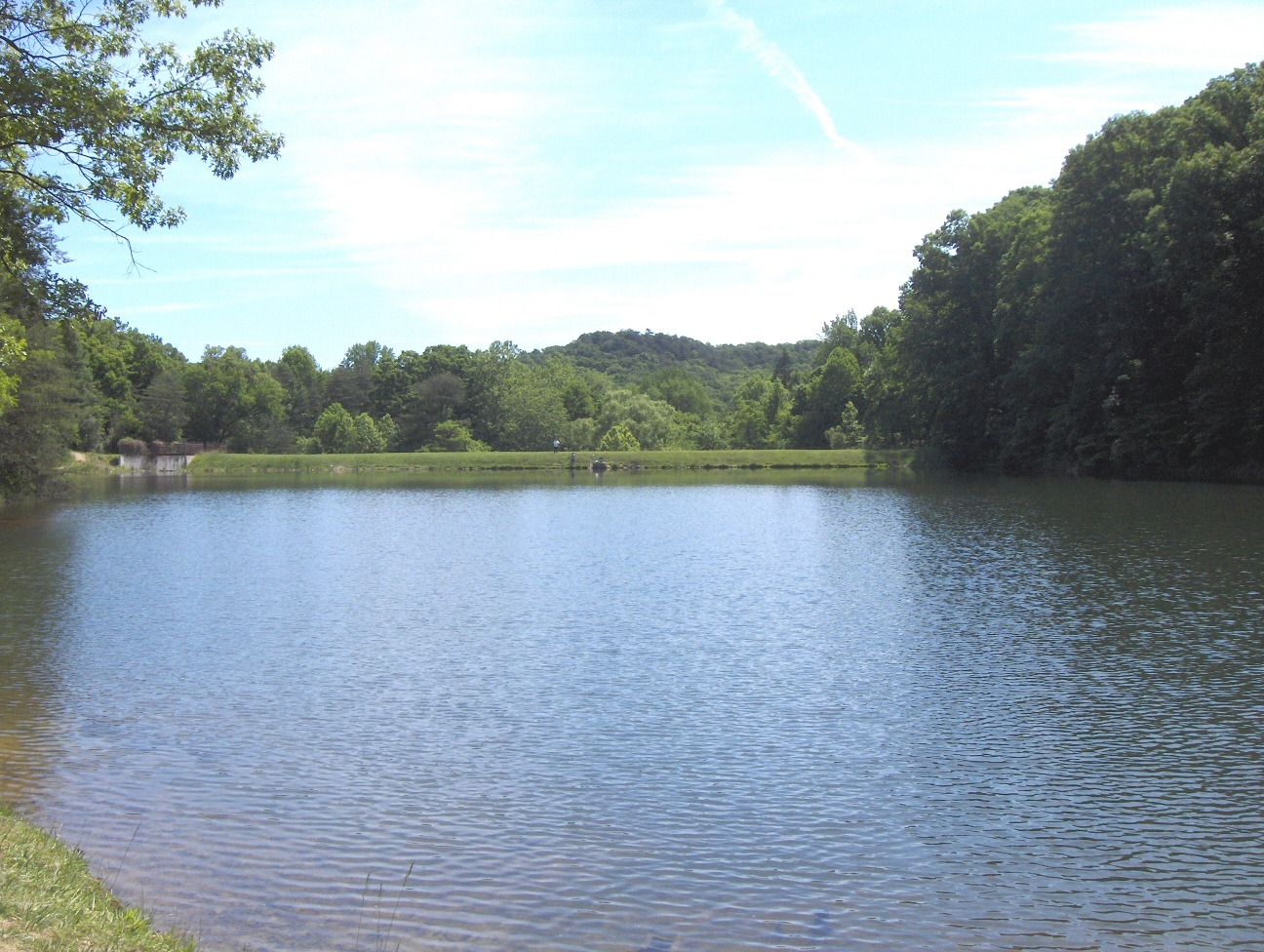
Tom Wallace Lake

The forest offers nearly 60 miles (97 km) of hiking and equestrian trails, including several which offer views of downtown Louisville. Several discrete usage areas are featured, including the Tom Wallace Recreation Area, with the 7-acre (28,000 m^{2}) Tom Wallace Lake, the Paul Yost Recreation Area, and the Horine Conference Center. Camping and fishing are both permitted. Tom Wallace Lake is stocked with trout and catfish twice a year. Tom Wallace Recreation Area features various handicapped-accessible facilities, including a fishing dock and a 1,560-foot-long (480 m) natural trail, the Tulip Tree Trail. The Horine Conference Center is a popular field trip destination for Louisville schools.

A hiking trail, the Siltstone Trail, traverses much of the forest from east to west. There are several local hiking trails, in addition. Horine also features many hiking trails and both the Paul Yost and Tom Wallace Recreation Areas have horse trails. No mountain biking is permitted in the forest at this time, but the low traffic roads and hilly terrain afford road cyclists many challenging routes through the forest and surrounding areas.

== See also ==
- The Parklands of Floyds Fork
- List of parks in the Louisville metropolitan area
- List of attractions and events in the Louisville metropolitan area
- City of Parks
- Valley of the Drums, a toxic waste dump near Jefferson Memorial Forest
