= Muldraugh Hill =

Geographic feature in Kentucky

Coordinates: 37°28′15″N 85°20′50″W

Muldraugh Hill is an escarpment in Floyd County, Indiana, and Bullitt, Hardin, Jefferson, Nelson, Marion, Casey, Lincoln and Rockcastle counties of central Kentucky separating the Knobs Region and Bluegrass on the north and north-east from the Pennyrile on the south and south-west. This escarpment fades into the Pottsville Escarpment in Rockcastle County. In the west, it crosses the Ohio River near the towns of Muldraugh and West Point and forms a steep edge to the river valley in Indiana to Floyds Knobs and farther north, though it is not generally referred to as Muldraugh Hill in Indiana.

In parts of its eastern stretches, around Crab Orchard and Brodhead, Muldraugh Hill is little more than a slight hill, but just to the west, Halls Gap is perhaps the most notable traverse of the escarpment, by U.S. Route 27. Perhaps the most traveled traverses are on the Bluegrass Parkway and U.S. Route 31W in Hardin County, the latter just north of the town of Muldraugh. In most of the west, the escarpment overlooks extensive areas of knobs, defined as the narrow Knobs Region. This landform consists mostly of siltstones and shales, with some minor limestones, lying between the limestones and dolomites of the older Bluegrass and the limestones of the newer Pennyrile. The escarpment exposes four eras of the geological column, from oldest to youngest: Ordovician, Silurian, Devonian and Mississippian.

The escarpment was apparently named for Capt. John Muldraugh, an early pioneer who lived along it. The Jefferson Memorial Forest in Louisville, Kentucky and Bernheim Forest in Bullitt and Nelson Counties are both located within the knobs of Muldraugh Hill, as is part of Fort Knox.

== See also ==
- Geography of Louisville, Kentucky
