= Knobs State Forest =

State forest in Kentucky, United States

Knobs State Forest and Wildlife Management Area
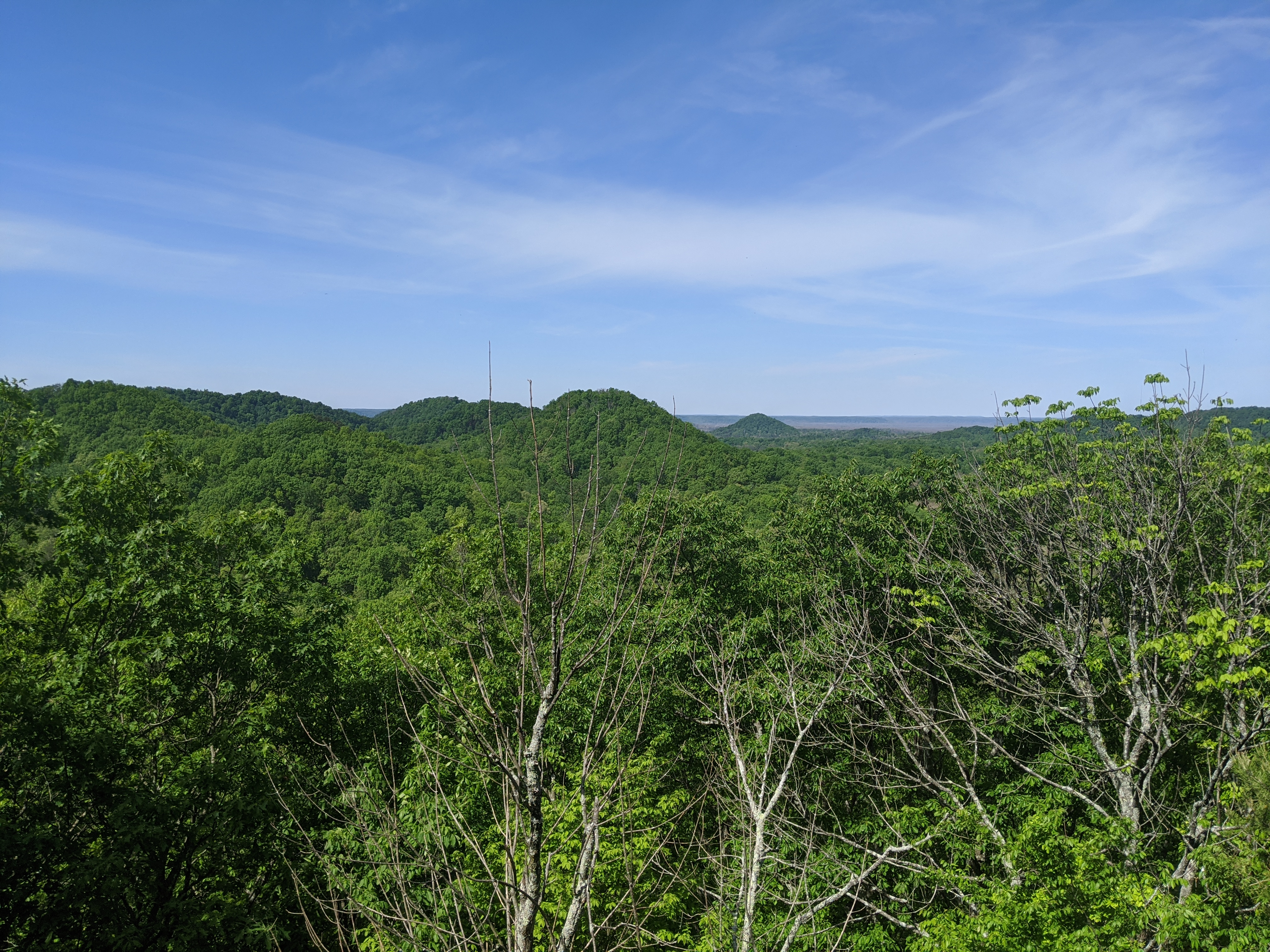
- Terminus of the orange trail

- Location within the United States Location within Kentucky
- Location: Bullitt County, Kentucky
- Nearest city: Shepherdsville, Kentucky
- Coordinates: 37°52′53″N 85°40′35″W
- Area: 2,035 acres (8.24 km^{2})
- Max. elevation: 975 feet (297 m)
- Min. elevation: 467 feet (142 m)
- Established: 2006
- Governing body: Department of Natural Resources, Division of Forests
- Website: eec.ky.gov/Natural-Resources/Forestry/ky-state-forests/Pages/Knobs-State-Forest-and-Wildlife-Management-Area.aspx

Knobs State Forest and Wildlife Management Area is a 2,035 acre state forest located in Bullitt County, Kentucky, United States. The forest is located about 28 miles south of Louisville, Kentucky. It is managed for sustainable timber production.

== History ==
The tract of land that would eventually become Knobs State Forest and Wildlife Management Area is a former tree farm that has a long history of logging. In the 1840s the forest was rapidly cleared and was then selectively logged in 1980s and 1990s. Dr. James G. Kuhns and his sister Mrs. Anne E. Kuhns-van der Steur inherited the land, and out of concern of rapid industrialization in the area, sold it to the State of Kentucky in order to preserve it in perpetuity using $3.3 million from the Kentucky Heritage Land Conservation Fund. In July 2006 1,110 acres from that purchase were used to establish Knobs State Forest. Making it the Kentucky's sixth state owned forest and its first Forest Legacy Project. It was expanded in November 2006 and again in October 2018 with the purchase of 429 and 496 acres respectively.

The 2018 purchase was part of a project to create a wildlife corridor linking Knobs State Forest with nearby Bernheim Arboretum and Research Forest. Incidentally, during the period 1959–1980, 4,000 acres of the Bernheim property was leased by the State of Kentucky and bore the name Knobs State Forest.

== Ecology ==
The area of the reserve is 93% forested with the remaining 7% being open land. It is dominated by upland hardwoods. It contains at least 198 different plant species including one infrequent species; the butterfly pea. White and chestnut oak account for 60% of the tree canopy. There are no lakes or ponds in the forest. The only water sources are Crooked Creek in the north of the forest and Cain Run which originates in the south of the forest.

== Recreation ==
Knobs State forest is open to the public for day use. Common activities are hiking, hunting, and wildlife viewing. The forest contains 5.8 miles across three maintained hiking trails, all of which are old logging roads. In addition, there is also one 1.2 mile trail that has been abandoned. Common game species are deer, turkey, and squirrel.

While fishing is allowed in the forest, all water sources are intermittent, limiting fishing opportunities.

== See also ==
- Knobs region
- List of Kentucky state forests
