= Knobs region =

Area of Kentucky, United States

Coordinates: 37°52′53″N 85°40′35″W

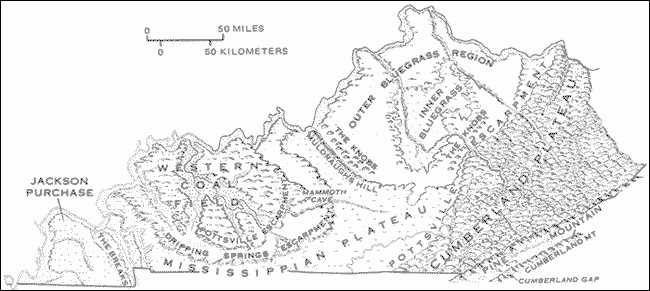
USGS physiographic map of Kentucky showing two locations of The Knobs, one northwest of the Pottsville Escarpment and the other northeast of Muldraugh's Hill

The Knobs Region or The Knobs is located in the US state of Kentucky. It is a narrow, arc-shaped region consisting of hundreds of isolated hills. The region wraps around the southern and eastern parts of the Bluegrass region in the north central to northeastern part of the state. The western end of the Knobs region begins near Louisville, Kentucky and continues southeastward through Bullitt, Hardin, Nelson, LaRue, Marion County, Taylor, Boyle, Casey, Lincoln, and Garrard counties before turning northeast and running along the Pottsville Escarpment and the Appalachian Plateau. The Knob arc has a length of 230 miles (370 km).

Many of the hills are conical and up to several hundred feet high, some with capstones that form cliffs. The monadnocks formed from the eroding margins of the Pennyroyal Plateau to the south and the Cumberland Plateau to the east. The caprock is Mississippian Harrodsburg Limestone and the slopes are Borden Formation shales of Devonian to Mississippian age.

== See also ==
- Knobs State Forest
