= Tygarts State Forest =

State forest in Kentucky, United States

- Location within the United States Location within Kentucky
- Location: Carter County, Kentucky
- Nearest city: Grayson, Kentucky
- Coordinates: 38°23′08″N 83°08′56″W
- Area: 874 acres (3.54 km^{2})
- Established: 1957
- Governing body: Department of Natural Resources, Division of Forests

Tygarts State Forest is a state forest in Carter County, Kentucky, United States. The 874 acres (3.54 km^{2}) forest was established in 1957, near Carter Caves State Resort Park.
