= Halls Butt =

Summit in Kentucky, United States

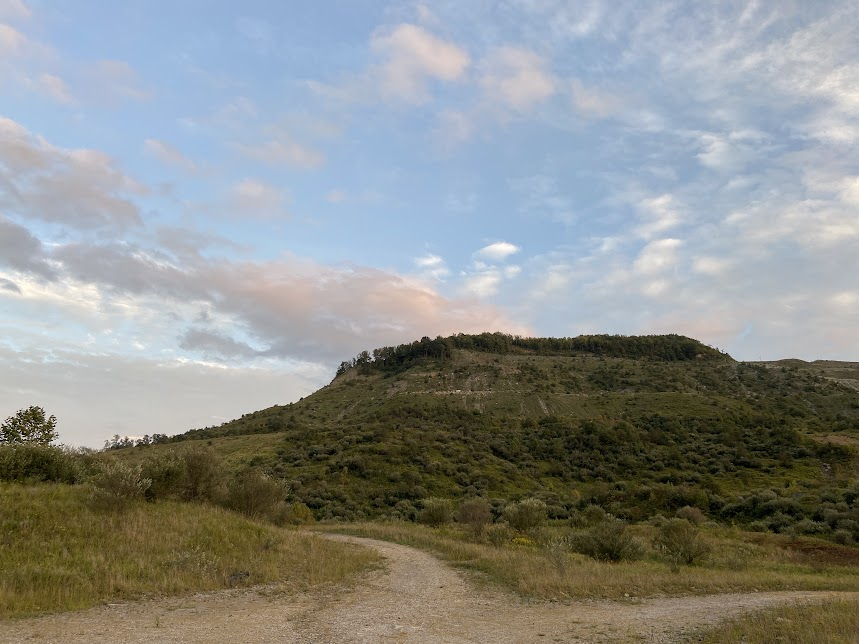
- Halls Butt

Highest point
- Elevation: 3,097 (944 m)
- Coordinates: 37°1′56.14″N 82°48′49.95″W

Geography
- Location within Kentucky
- Location: Letcher County, Kentucky, U.S.
- Parent range: Appalachian Mountains

Halls Butt is a summit located in Letcher County, Kentucky, United States. With an elevation of 3,097 feet (944 m), Halls Butt is the 11th highest summit in Kentucky, and 45,419th highest in the United States.
