= Olympia State Forest =

Former state forest in Bath County, Kentucky

- Location within the United States Location within Kentucky
- Location: Bath County, Kentucky
- Nearest city: Morehead, Kentucky
- Coordinates: 38°02′39″N 83°41′23″W
- Area: 780 acres (3.2 km^{2})
- Established: 1930
- Governing body: Department of Natural Resources, Division of Forests

Olympia State Forest is a former state forest located in Bath County, Kentucky, United States and covering 780 acres. It was located west of Morehead, Kentucky. The forest has an average elevation of 892 feet (272 m).
