= Dewey Lake State Forest =

State forest in Kentucky, United States

Coordinates: 37.7161°N 82.7206°W

Dewey Lake State Forest is a state forest in Floyd County, Kentucky, United States. The 7,353-acre (29.76 km^{2}) forest is leased to the state of Kentucky by the United States Army Corps of Engineers. The forest is in proximity of Jenny Wiley State Resort Park.
