= Cumberland Plateau =

Plateau in the United States

Coordinates: 36°N 85°W

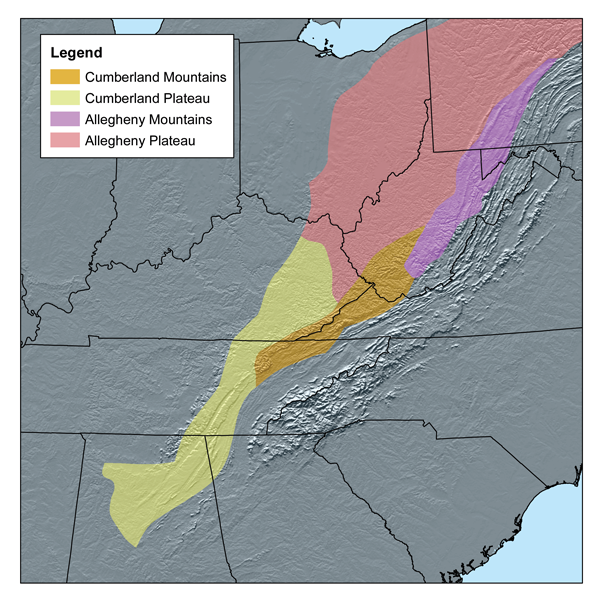
Map showing the Cumberland Plateau in yellow as defined by Bailey's ecoregions

The Cumberland Plateau is the southern part of the Appalachian Plateau in the Appalachian Mountains of the United States. It includes much of eastern Kentucky and Tennessee, and portions of northern Alabama and northwest Georgia. The terms "Allegheny Plateau" and the "Cumberland Plateau" both refer to the dissected plateau lands lying west of the main Appalachian Mountains. The terms stem from historical usage rather than geological difference, so there is no strict dividing line between the two. Two major rivers share the names of the plateaus, with the Allegheny River rising in the Allegheny Plateau and the Cumberland River rising in the Cumberland Plateau in Harlan County, Kentucky.

== Geography ==
The Cumberland Plateau is a deeply dissected plateau, with topographic relief commonly of about 400 feet (120 metres), and frequent limestone outcroppings and bluffs.

At Kentucky's Pottsville Escarpment, which is the transition from the Cumberland Plateau to the Bluegrass in the north and the Pennyrile in the south, there are many spectacular cliffs, gorges, rockhouses, natural bridges, and waterfalls. In Tennessee, the Cumberland Plateau's western border is the Highland Rim east of the Nashville Basin, and its eastern edge is marked by Walden Ridge, which continues south into Alabama as Sand Mountain. Walden Ridge and Sand Mountain are separated from the main portion of the Cumberland Plateau by the Sequatchie Valley. The Sequatchie River empties into the Tennessee River just below Nickajack Dam and the valley extends into Jackson County, Alabama, as part of the Tennessee Valley.

In Kentucky, the height of the plateau's hills increases from northwest to southeast, with the westernmost areas of the plateau having a relief of around 200 feet (61 m) and an appearance similar to the knobs region, whereas areas near Black Mountain have a relief exceeding 2,500 feet (760 m).

== Geology and physiography ==
The Cumberland Plateau is a physiographic section of the larger Appalachian Plateau province, which in turn is part of the larger Appalachian Highlands physiographic division. The Plateau rises about 1,000 feet (300 m) above the surrounding areas in the region (Tennessee Vacation, 2018). The rough topography that makes up the Cumberland Plateau has caused a development of isolated settlements and the local economies based on subsistence agriculture (Britannica, 2016).

The sedimentary rocks that compose the Cumberland Plateau and larger Appalachian Plateau are of Mississippian and Pennsylvanian geological age, composed of near-shore sediments washed westward from the Appalachian Mountains. Some rock layers were laid down in shallow coastal waters, some, including bituminous coal seams were laid onshore in swampy environments. These are interlaced with delta formations of cross-bedded sandstones and occasionally conglomerate.

There are numerous discontinuities in the beds, where they were raised high enough to be eroded, then lowered to have more sediments added on top near Cumberland Falls, 400 feet (120 m) below the top of the formation, going by the age of the bedrock which has moved less than 0.1 inches (2.5 mm) for the last 300 million years, caused mainly by lateral erosion of the plateau.

== Natural history and conservation ==
The plateau contains some of the largest stretches of contiguous forest in the eastern United States. Regionally, forests are intermediate between oak (Quercus) and hickory (Carya) forest types with pines (Pinus) occurring on dry, upland sites and mesophytic species occurring in protected coves.

The Oak Ridge National Laboratory is involved with the conservation of the mixed mesophytic forests within the Northern Cumberland Plateau. Conservation organizations active on the Cumberland Plateau include The Nature Conservancy, the Doris Duke Charitable Foundation, and the Natural Resources Defense Council.

== See also ==
- Cumberland Mountains
- Geology of the Appalachians
- List of subranges of the Appalachian Mountains
