= Green River State Forest =

State forest in Kentucky, United States

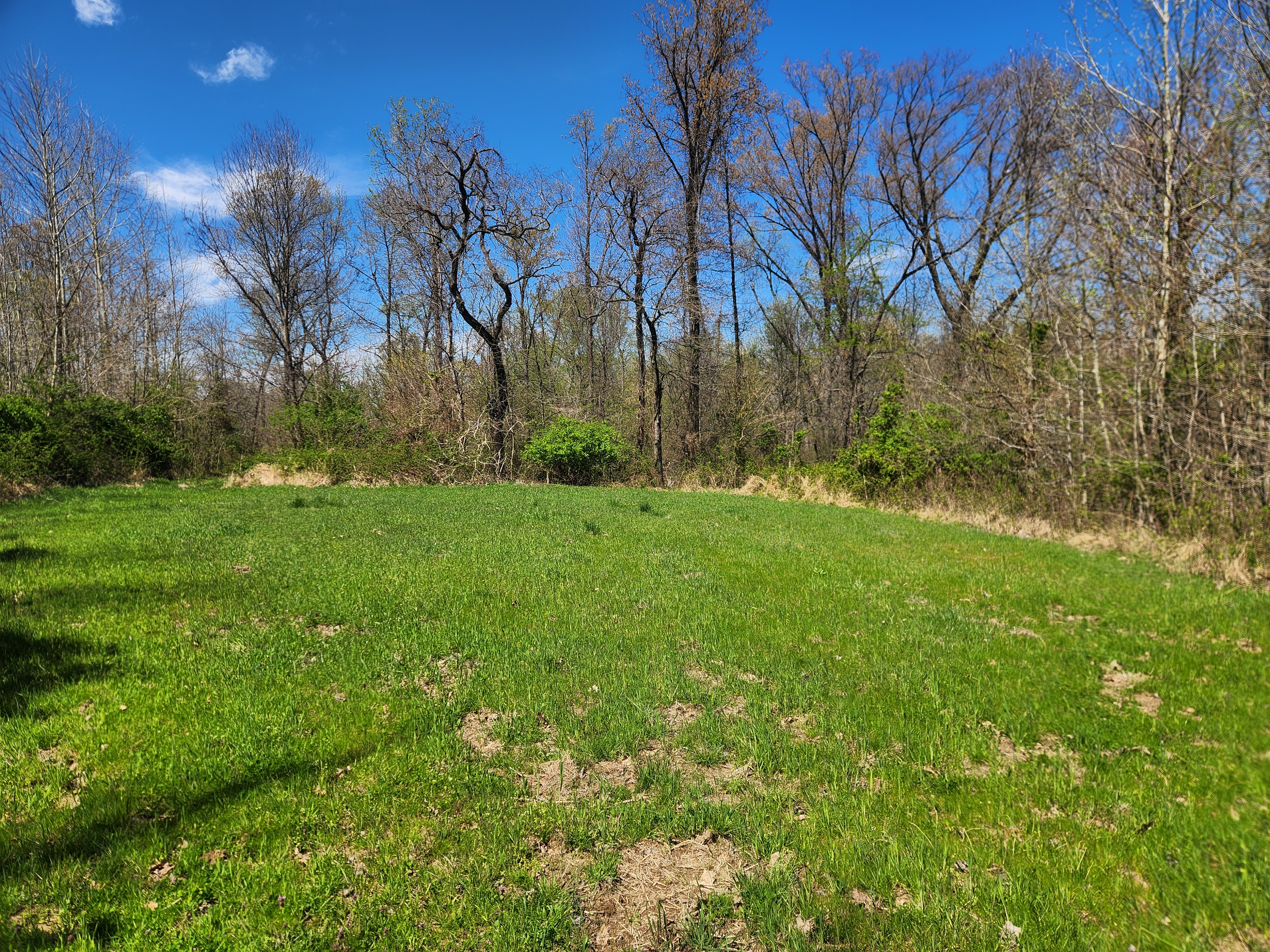
- Green River State Forest

- Location within the United States Location within Kentucky
- Location: Henderson County, Kentucky
- Nearest city: Henderson, Kentucky
- Coordinates: 37°52′33″N 87°28′35″W
- Area: 1,092 acres (4.42 km^{2})
- Max. elevation: 580 feet (180 m)
- Min. elevation: 350 feet (110 m)
- Established: 1998
- Governing body: Department of Natural Resources, Division of Forests
- Website: eec.ky.gov/Natural-Resources/Forestry/ky-state-forests/Pages/Green-River-State-Forest.aspx

Green River State Forest is a 1,092 acres (442 ha) state forest located in Henderson County, Kentucky, United States. The forest is located about 2 miles (3.2 km) east of Henderson, Kentucky. It is managed for research and recreation.

== History ==
In 1978, 689 acres (279 ha) of the tract of land that would eventually become Green River State Forest were purchased by the federal government and the Kentucky Center for Research, with the plan being to build a synthetic fuel research facility in response to the 1970s energy crisis. However, no facility was ever built and parts of the land were leased to local farmers. In July 1998, ownership of the land was transferred to the Kentucky Division of Forestry to establish the state forest. Later, a further 404 acres (163 ha) were purchased using money from the Kentucky Heritage Land Conservation Fund and added to the preserve. First, the 133-acre (54 ha)Bush tract was acquired in May 2001, while the 271-acre (110 ha)LG&E tract was acquired in December 2004, bringing the total area to 1,092 non-contiguous acres along both the Ohio and Green rivers.

Since becoming protected land, agriculture in the preserve has ceased. The forest has become Kentucky's first carbon sequestration project with more than 538 acres (218 ha) of former farm land being replanted with hardwood seedlings. Future plans for the area are to purchase adjacent land to create a forest block of 3,000 to 3,500 acres (1,400 ha), with the goal of reestablishing bottomland hardwood forest and cedar swamp habitats.

Green River State Forest borders both the Green River National Wildlife Refuge and Audubon State Park.

== Ecology ==
The area of the reserve is 45% open land, 40% forested, and 14% wetland with about 65 acres (26 ha) of swampland. It is periodically flooded, creating a diverse forest. It contains at least 189 species of plants including the state threatened white nymph. Green River State Forest is the only state forest in Kentucky that contains significant amounts of bottomland hardwoods and swampland, with the swamplands and sloughs being dominated by bald cypress, cottonwood, and river birch, and the bottomlands dominated by oak, pecan, and red maple. The upland forest is dominated by oak, hickory, sugar maple, and catalpa. The bottomlands also provide habitat for the rare copperbelly water snake.

== Recreation ==
Green River State Forest is open to the public for day use. Common activities are hiking, horseback riding, hunting, fishing, and wildlife viewing. Common game species are deer, turkey and waterfowl. Fishing is allowed along the banks of the Ohio and Green rivers. The forest contains over 6 miles (9.7 km) of hiking trails with most of which being mowed paths through fields.

== Archeology ==
The upland forest contains ancient burial mounds that are archaeologically significant.

== Gallery ==
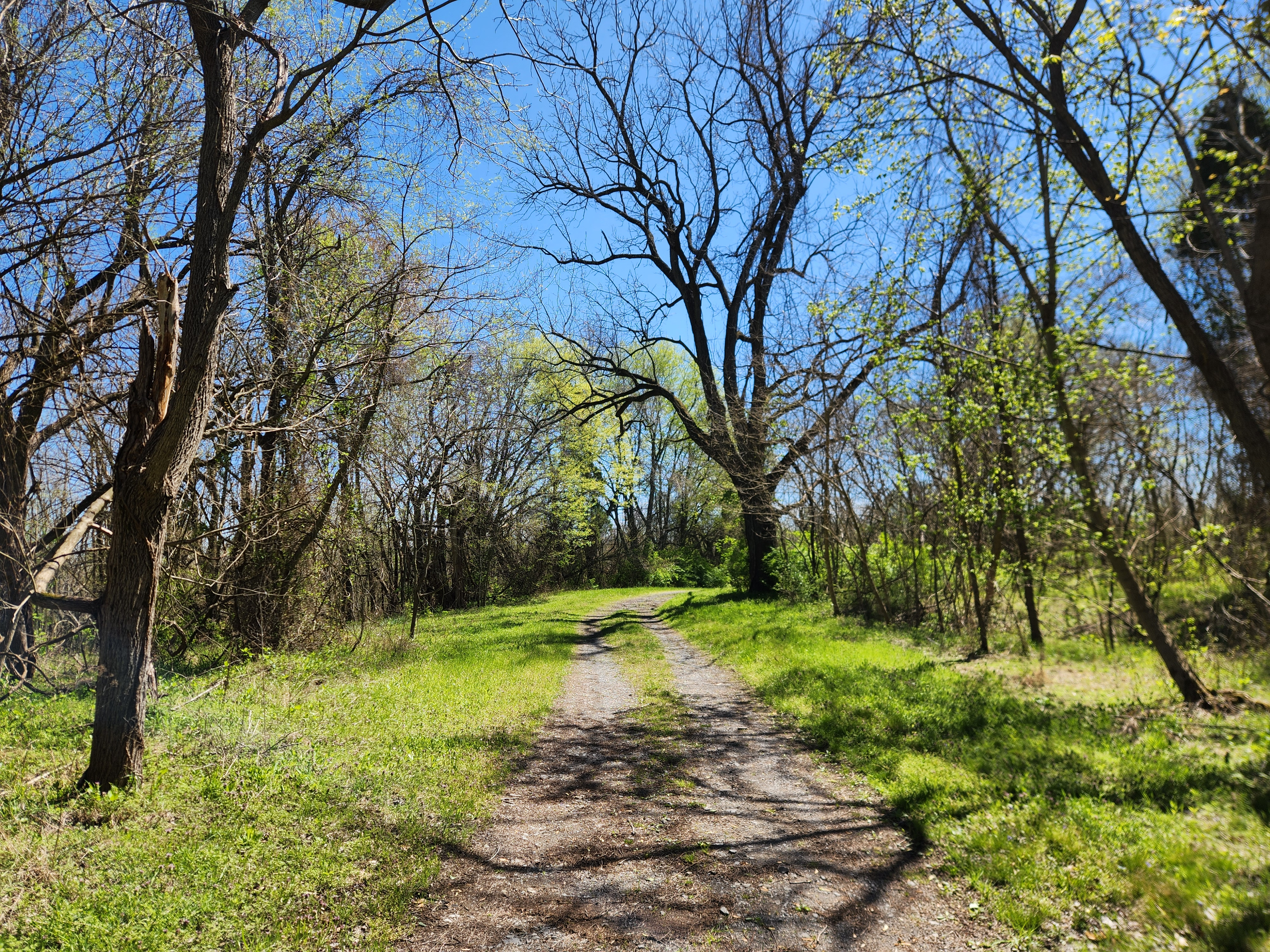

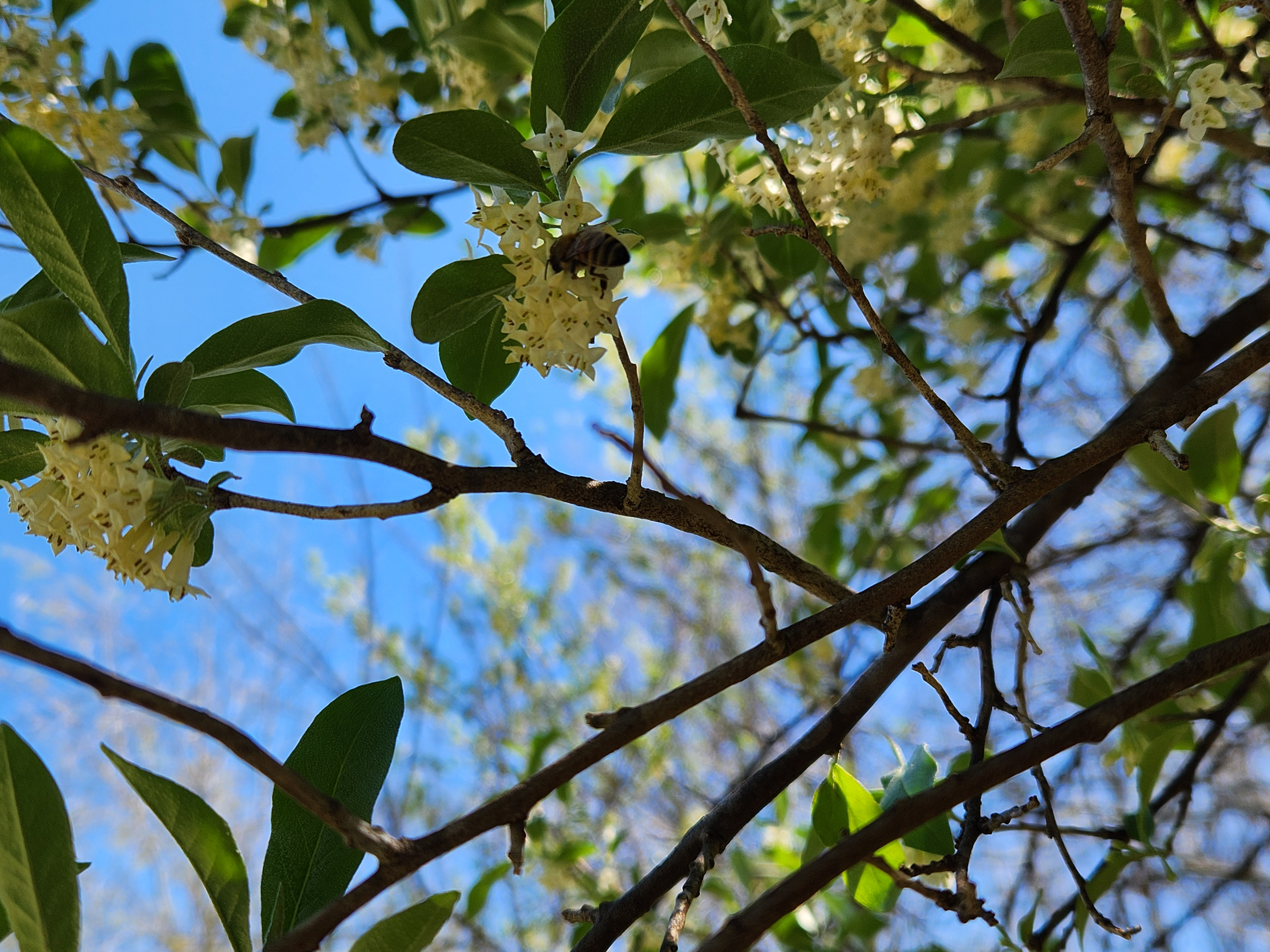

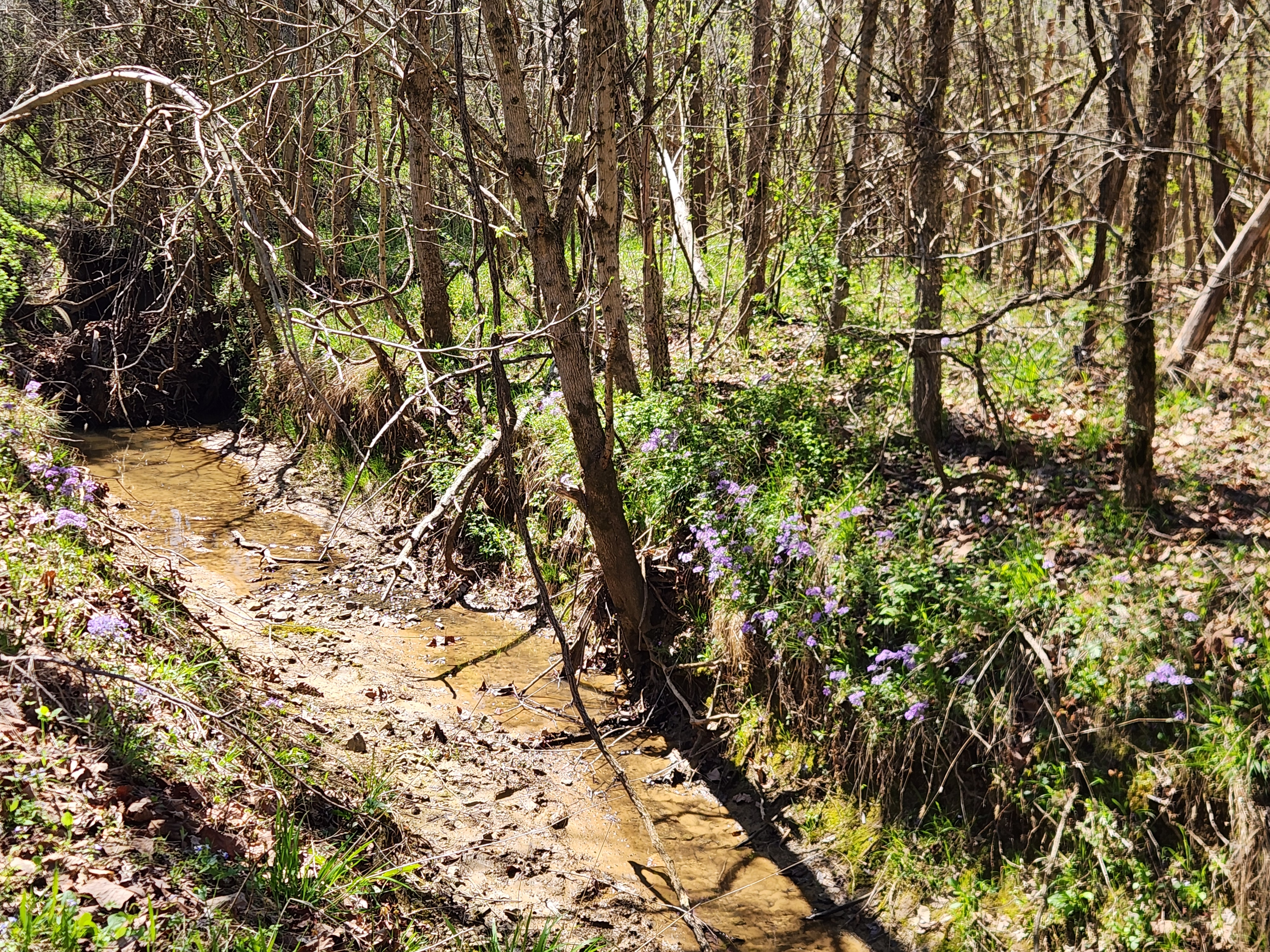
