= Pennyroyal Plateau =

Physiographic region of Kentucky, US

Coordinates: 37°30′N 86°10′W

Regions of Kentucky, with the Pennyroyal Plateau shown in light brown (labeled as the Mississippi Plateau)

The Pennyroyal Plateau or Pennyroyal Region, often spelled Pennyrile, is a large physiographic region of Kentucky that features rolling hills, caves, and karst topography in general. It is named for Hedeoma pulegioides (the American pennyroyal), a wild mint that grows in the area. It is also called the "Mississippian Plateau," for the Mississippian geologic age in which it was formed.

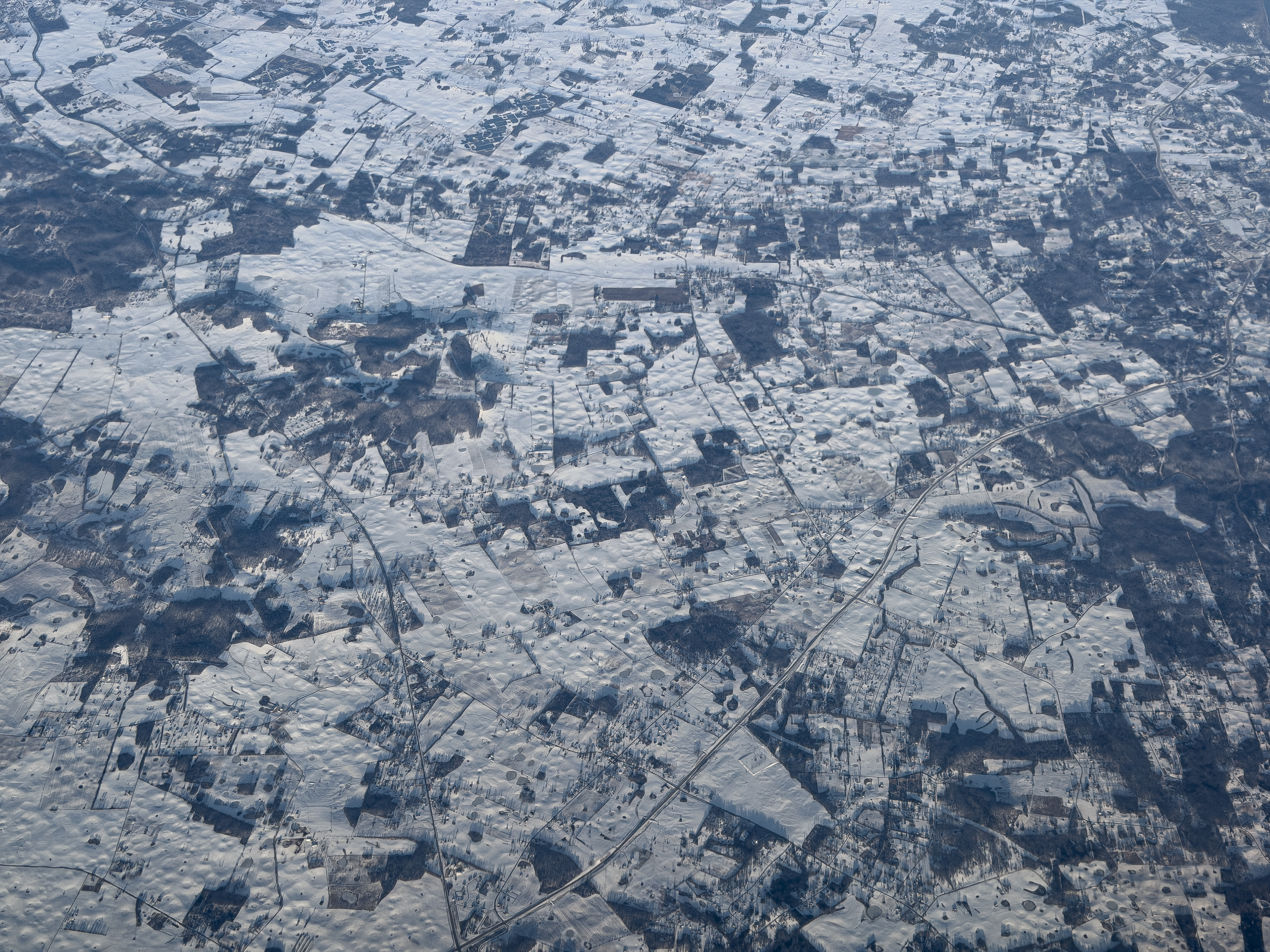
Depressions and sinkholes visible in Meade County, Kentucky, located in the northern Pennyroyal Plateau

The Pennyroyal is bordered by the Pottsville Escarpment in the east. The Pottsville Escarpment is the transition zone from the central part of Kentucky to the higher and geologically younger Cumberland Plateau in the eastern part of the state. The Pennyroyal is bordered on the north by Muldraugh Hill, the geological escarpment that forms the transition from the geologically older Bluegrass to the Pennyroyal. This is a series of knobs and ridges based on hard siltstones.

The Pennyroyal is bordered on the west by the younger Jackson Purchase. The Pennyroyal is often thought by non-geologists to include the West Kentucky Coal Field of Pennsylvanian age, located in the northwestern area of the state, as the southeastern part of the Illinois Basin. The coalfield and the Pennyroyal are of different geologic ages and are separated by the Clifty Region, largely of Pennsylvanian sandstone, occasionally bituminous; the boundary with the Pennyroyal is the Dripping Springs Escarpment.

To the south, the Pennyroyal continues as the Highland Rim of Middle Tennessee, to the north it continues as the Indiana Uplands of Southern Indiana.

The Pennyroyal is largely in farmland where the bedrock is limestone, and most of the Pennyroyal is based on Mississippian limestone, particularly the St. Louis Limestone or Ste. Genevieve Limestone. In some areas, the limestone is capped with a soft sandstone. This kind of formation is featured in the Mammoth Cave area, and has enabled the formation of the world's most extensive cave system. Numerous other caves exist in the Pennyroyal, where some of the most intensely cave-forming limestones of the world are to be found.

Where the capping sandstone is intact, the land surface is usually forested, rugged hills.
