= Eden Shale Hills =

Hills in Kentucky, U.S.

Coordinates: 38°19′52″N 84°04′09″W

Eden Shale Hills of the Eden Shale soil type is a broad area of short, steep hills roughly separating the Inner Bluegrass region and Outer Bluegrass region of Kentucky. They occur generally from around Oldham County in the West to Fleming County in the East. The hills are 150 feet or less in height.
