= Bluegrass region =

Geographic region in the U.S. state of Kentucky

Coordinates: 38.0°N 84.5°W

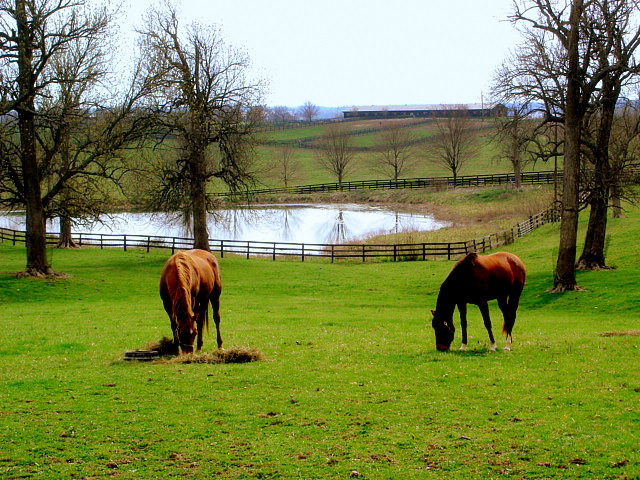
Kentucky's Inner Bluegrass region features hundreds of horse farms.

Regions of Kentucky, with the Bluegrass region in the northern part of the state

The Bluegrass region is a geographic region in the U.S. state of Kentucky. It makes up the central and northern part of the state, roughly bounded by the cities of Frankfort, Paris, Richmond and Stanford. It is part of the Interior Low Plateaus ecoregion.

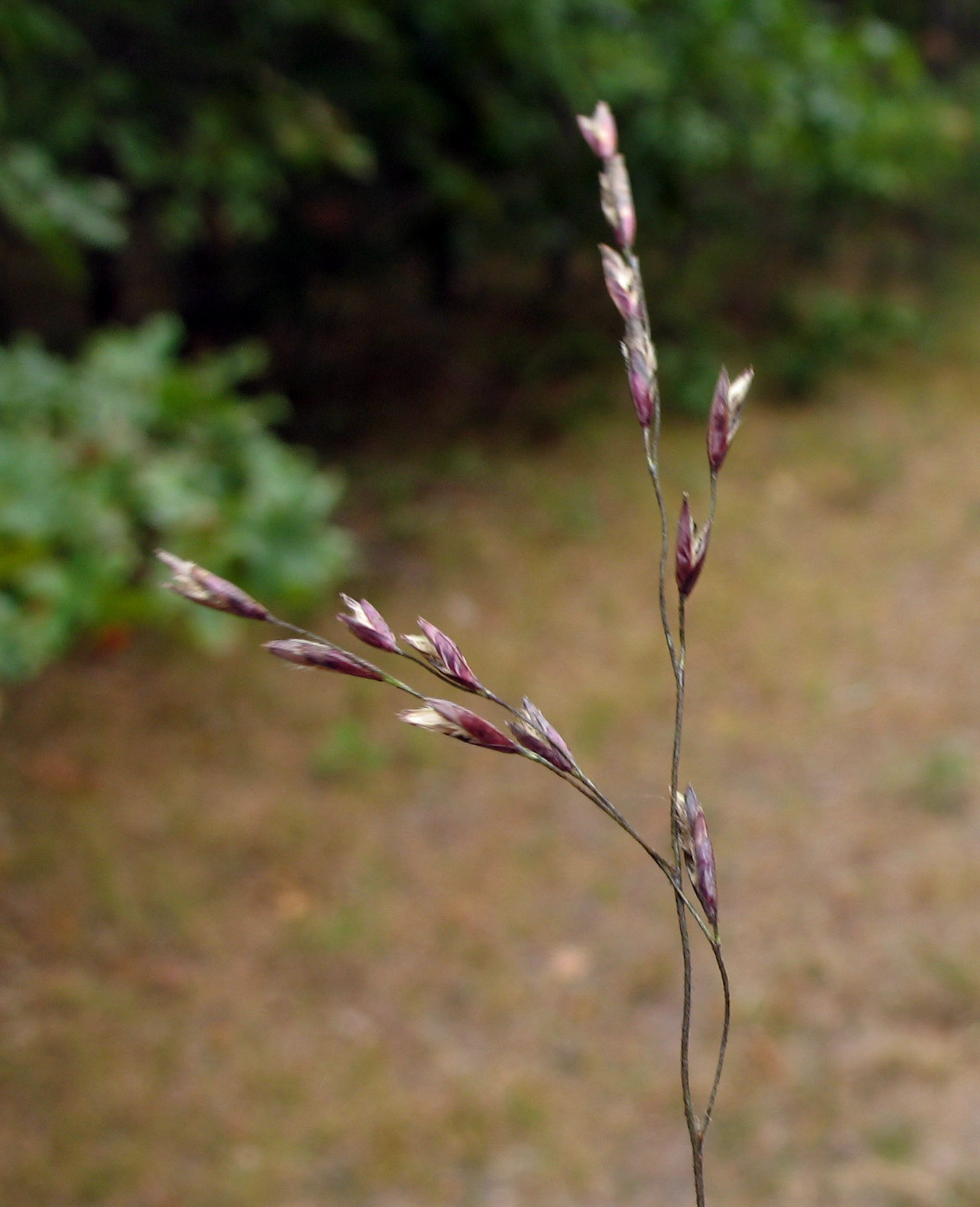
"Bluegrass": The seeds go from green to purplish blue to brown. During the purplish blue phase the seed stems have a dark blue coating.

"Bluegrass" is a common name given in the United States for grass of the Poa genus, the most famous being the Kentucky bluegrass. Despite its name, Kentucky bluegrass is native to North Africa and was likely introduced around 1600.

== Geology ==
The Bluegrass region is characterized by underlying fossiliferous limestone, dolomite, and shale of the Ordovician geological age. Hills are generally rolling, and the soil is highly fertile for growing pasture.

The Kentucky Bluegrass is bounded on the east by the Cumberland Plateau, with the Pottsville Escarpment forming the boundary. On the south and west, it borders the Pennyroyal Plateau, (also called the Pennyrile), with Muldraugh Hill, another escarpment, forming the boundary. Much of the region is drained by the Kentucky River and its tributaries. The river cuts a deep canyon called the Kentucky River Palisades through the region, preserving meanders that indicate that the river was once a mature low valley that was suddenly uplifted. Particularly near the Kentucky River, the region exhibits Karst topography, with sinkholes, caves, and disappearing streams that drain underground to the river.

== History ==
=== Prehistory ===
Before European-American settlement, various cultures of Indigenous peoples of the Americas lived in the region. The pre-colonization state of the Bluegrass is poorly known, but it is thought to have been a type of savannah known as oak savanna, with open grassland containing clover, giant river cane (a type of bamboo), and scattered enormous trees, primarily bur oak, blue ash, Shumard's oak, chinkapin oak, and kingnut hickory. Some of these trees, which are hundreds of years old, still stand in old pastures in the Bluegrass. The thickets of giant river cane, known as canebrakes, created a dense undergrowth that made it impossible to find 10 uncleared acres that were not full of cane. The local indigenous peoples hunted its large herds of bison and other game, especially near mineral licks. The name "Kentucky" likely comes from the word for "meadow lands" in Iroquoian, but has several other possible origins. Europeans adopted the name to apply to the state. "Bluegrass" is a common name given in the United States for grass of the Poa genus, the most famous being the Kentucky bluegrass.

=== Post-colonial ===
During the decades which followed the American Revolutionary War (1775–1783), Americans settled in great numbers in the region. They migrated mostly from Virginia. By 1800 these planters noticed that horses grazed in the Bluegrass region were more hardy than those from other regions; this is due to the soil's high calcium content. Within decades of increased settlement, the remaining herds of bison had moved west. The breeding of Thoroughbred horses was developed in the region, as well as of other quality livestock. Kentucky livestock was driven to Tennessee and other areas of the Ohio River valley for sale.

Planters, supported by slave labor, also cultivated major commodity crops on plantations, such as tobacco, hemp (see Hemp in Kentucky), and grapes (see Kentucky wine). The first commercial winery in the United States was opened in the Bluegrass region in 1801, in present-day Jessamine County by a group of Swiss immigrants. It was authorized by the Kentucky General Assembly.

=== 20th century to present ===
Since the antebellum years, the region has been a center for breeding quality livestock, especially thoroughbred race horses. Since the late 20th century, the area has become increasingly developed with residential and commercial properties, particularly around Lexington, the business center. Farms are losing ground to development and slowly disappearing. In 2006, the World Monuments Fund included the Bluegrass region on its global list of 100 most endangered sites.

Although Bluegrass music is popular throughout the region, the genre is named after the band Bill Monroe and the Blue Grass Boys, which in turn took their name from the state nickname of Kentucky.

== Gallery ==
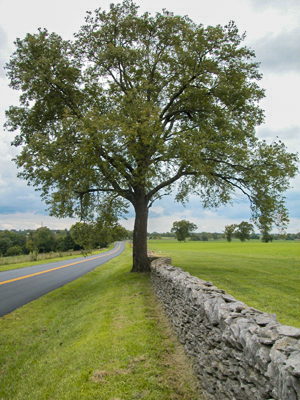
Bluegrass and rock fence of local limestone in central Kentucky

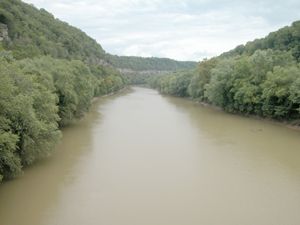
Kentucky River in the Bluegrass region

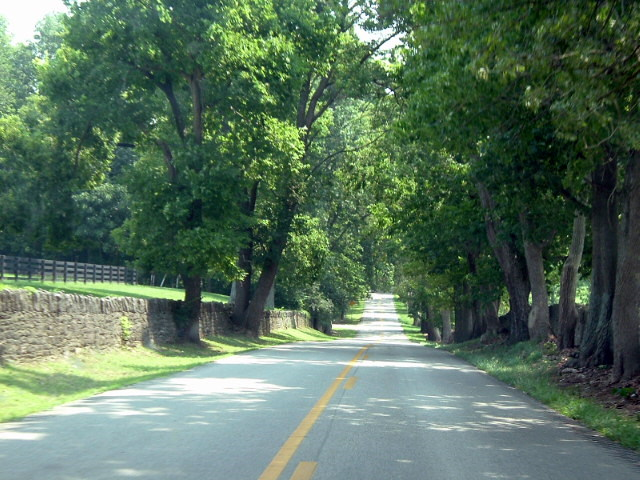
Narrow country roads bounded by stone and wood plank fences are a fixture in the Bluegrass region.
