= Pottsville Escarpment =

Geologic feature in Kentucky

Coordinates: 37°50′2″N 83°36′28″W

The Pottsville Escarpment is a resistant sandstone belt of cliffs and steep sided, narrow crested valleys in eastern Kentucky, USA. It features rock shelters, waterfalls, and natural bridges. It is also called the Cumberland Escarpment and forms the western edge of the Cumberland Plateau.

It is largely located within the Daniel Boone National Forest, the original area of which was located to specifically include this rugged strip of land.

Several significant natural areas in Kentucky are located within the escarpment zone. These include the Red River Gorge Geologic Area, Natural Bridge State Park, Cumberland Falls, Big South Fork National Recreation Area, and others.

== See also ==
- List of escarpments
