= National Register of Historic Places listings in McCreary County, Kentucky =

Location of McCreary County in Kentucky

This is a list of the National Register of Historic Places listings in McCreary County, Kentucky.

It is intended to be a complete list of the properties on the National Register of Historic Places in McCreary County, Kentucky, United States. The locations of National Register properties, for which the latitude and longitude coordinates are included below, can be seen on a map.

There are 3 properties listed on the National Register in the county.

This National Park Service list is complete through NPS recent listings posted December 12, 2025.

== Current listings ==
	Name on the Register	Image	Date listed	Location	City or town	Description
1	Barren Fork Coal Camp and Mine Archeological District	Barren Fork Coal Camp and Mine Archeological District	September 23, 1997 (#97001125)	Barren Fork Rd., north of Whitley City; 36°46′39″N 84°28′07″W	Whitley City	
2	Stearns Administrative and Commercial District	Stearns Administrative and Commercial District	November 16, 1988 (#88002528)	Old U.S. Route 27; 36°41′55″N 84°28′36″W	Stearns	Includes the McCreary County Museum
3	Stearns Golf Course		September 29, 2015 (#15000654)	131 Clubhouse Dr. 36°42′07″N 84°28′37″W	Stearns	

== See also ==
- List of National Historic Landmarks in Kentucky
- National Register of Historic Places listings in Kentucky
