= Big South Fork Scenic Railway =

American heritage railroad

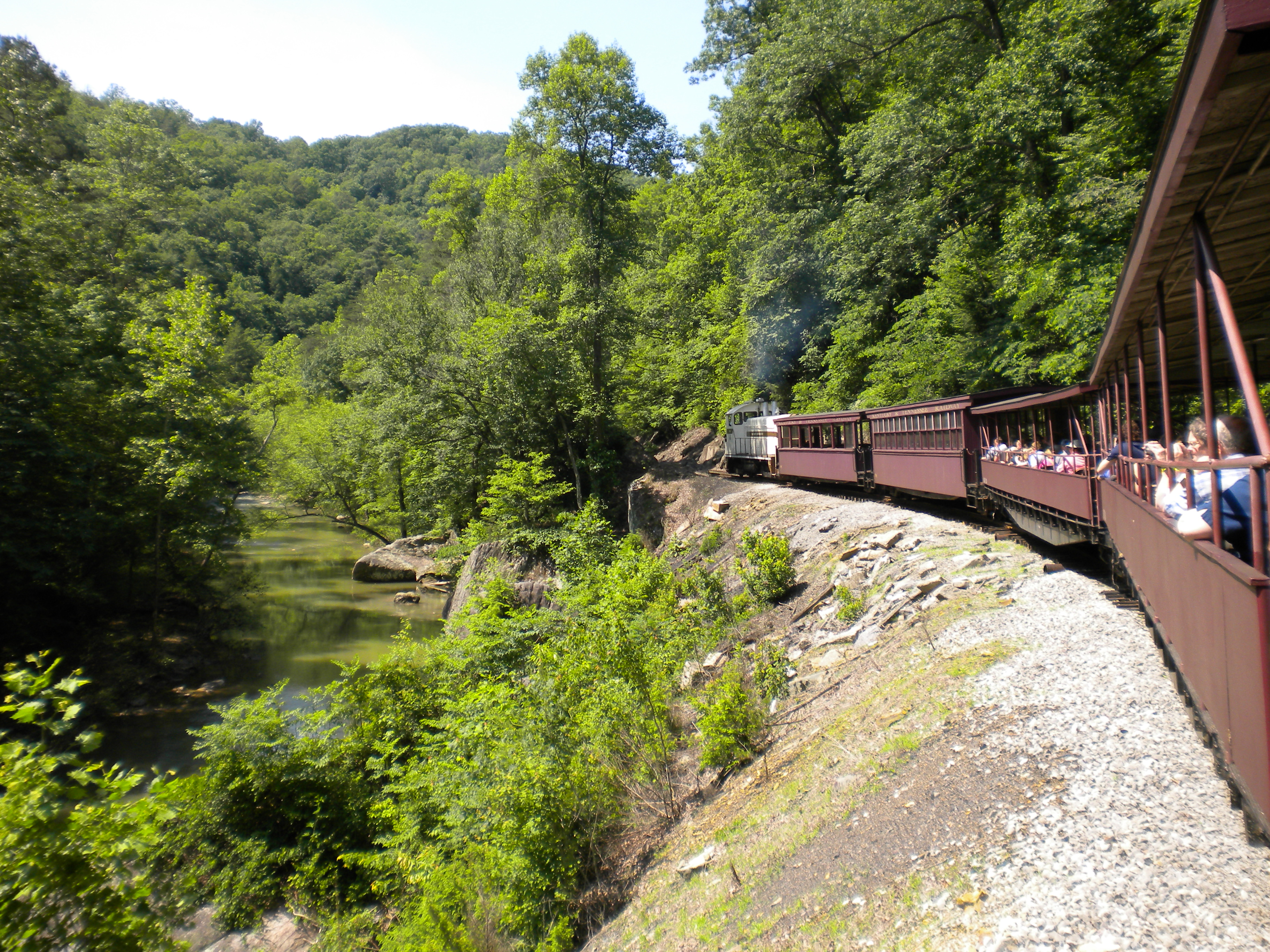

Overview
- Locale: McCreary County, Kentucky, US
- Transit type: Heritage railway
- Number of stations: 2
- Headquarters: Stearns, Kentucky
- Website: bsfsry.com

Technical
- System length: 16.0 mi (25.7 km)
- Track gauge: 4 ft 8 1/2 in (1,435 mm) (standard gauge)

The Big South Fork Scenic Railway is a heritage railroad in Stearns, Kentucky.

The route runs for 16 miles (26 km) through lush countryside in the Big South Fork National River and Recreation Area. There is a stop in the historic coal mining town of Blue Heron, Kentucky which can be toured. There is also a gift shop and snack bar with picnic shelter as well as hiking trails in Blue Heron.

The railroad is restoring a large 0-6-0 steam locomotive from the Union railroad built by ALCO in 1944 and uses diesel locomotives for its excursion trains.

The adjacent McCreary County Museum (admission included in train ticket) demonstrates life in Kentucky's coal company towns during the first half of the 20th century.

== History ==
The line that is used by the BSFSR was originally laid down by the Stearns Coal & Lumber Company, beginning in 1901. In order to move lumber from the Cumberland National Forest (now Daniel Boone National Forest), Stearns Company built the Kentucky & Tennessee Railroad. Shortly after opening up the lumber business, coal was discovered, and the company became Stearns Coal & Lumber. The first mine, at Barthell, was opened in 1902.

In 1904, the K&T changed their corporate charter name to the Kentucky & Tennessee Railway Company, in order to finance the extension of the line to Worley, White Oak Junction, Cooperative, and Bell Farm. Little K&T touched the Kentucky/Tennessee state line just south of Bell Farm. The line had graded roadbed to near Jamestown, Tennessee.

In 1937, Blue Heron Mining Camp was opened; K&T built a one-mile spur to the camp, crossing Roaring Paunch Creek. The bridge that was used to cross the creek was bought from New York Central Railroad (NYCRR) in 1936. K&T line builders needed a bridge to curve around to the right to meet the spur. The steel trestle was found in Upstate New York, shipped to Stearns, and installed upside down to meet the requirements. It is in use today, hauling passengers to Mine 18.

K&T had big plans to become a through trunk line railway. The Tennessee Central Railroad had a spur that ran into Monterey, Tennessee, where K&T hoped to meet them. Plans called for K&T and TC to meet in Monterey, Cookeville, Crab Orchard, and Harriman. They had intentions of using Southern Railway tracks into Chattanooga, but negotiations stalled with SR in 1951. In December 1963, the railroad purchased four ALCO S-2 diesel locomotives from the Denver and Rio Grande Western Railroad. The line's remaining steam locomotives remained on standby service until their official retirement in February 1964. Today, engines #10 and #12 (formerly Southern Railway 4501), (both 2-8-2 Mikados), are currently residing at the Tennessee Valley Railroad Museum in Chattanooga, Tennessee with #12 restored to operational condition with its original Southern Railway colors and number 4501 whilst #10 is awaiting restoration.

In 1974. Stearns opened up Justus Mine, which would technically be Mine 19. It was named in honor of the town's founder, Justus S. Stearns, and operated from 1974 until its closure by Blue Diamond Coal in October 1987.

The Big South Fork Scenic Railway started operating on July 1, 1982. The railway had 7 open-air passenger cars, all home built, and two ALCo S2 diesel switchers, Nos. 102 and 105. Number 102 was the second of four Alco switchers K&T purchased from the Denver & Rio Grande Western Railway in late 1963. Each unit spent two months in East St. Louis, Illinois, getting multiple unit controls installed.

BSFSR is a railway that serves tourists and railfans. Trains Magazine has said that "the K&/BSFSR is a trip back in time, when life was simple. The scenery is second to none and the hospitality of the citizens and staff is good at their job.”

== Locomotives ==
These are the locomotives that ran on the Kentucky & Tennessee Railway.

No.	Model	Builder	Built	Serial number	Retired	Notes
1	2-8-0	ALCo-Schenectady	1903	27409	1953	Purchased New. Scrapped 1953.
2	Shay locomotive	Lima Locomotive Works	1904	874	1953	Purchased New. Sold to Georgia Car & Locomotive. Later became Grasse River Railroad #6.
3	Shay	Lima Locomotive Works	1905	1530	1909	Purchased New. Sold to the Raleigh Lumber Company in 1909. Sold to Southern Iron & Locomotive who later sold it to the Smoky Mountain Railroad as their #1. It was later sold to the Ritter Lumber Company as their #5. It was scrapped in 1942.
4	Shay	Lima Locomotive Works	1906	1675	1909	Purchased New. Sold to Millstead Manufacturing Company in 1909.
5	0-4-0ST	H.K. Porter, Inc.	1881	406	Unknown	Ex-Lucy Furnace Company #3. Later sold to Southern Iron & Locomotive as their #1211 who later sold it to Pittsburgh Construction Company as their #7 in 1917.
6	0-6-0ST	Baldwin Locomotive Works	1877	4202	1920	Ex-Memphis & Little Rock Railroad #16. Later sold to Cincinnati Equipment Company who later sold it to the K&T. Scrapped 1920.
7	2-8-2	Baldwin Locomotive Works	1908	32763	1951	Purchased New. Scrapped in 1951.
8	2-6-2	Baldwin Locomotive Works	1911	37269	1951	Purchased New. Scrapped in 1951.
9	2-6-0	Pittsburgh Locomotive and Car Works	1907	44416	1940	Ex-Atlantic Equipment & Construction Company #1. Sold to SA&N who later sold it to the K&T. It was scrapped in 1940.
10	2-8-2	Baldwin Locomotive Works	May 1920	53182	February 1964	Purchased New. Retired in February 1964. Now at the Tennessee Valley Railroad Museum awaiting restoration.
11	2-8-2	ALCo-Schenectady	1922	63271	1963	Purchased New. Retired in 1963. Sold to the U.S. Army to move gunnery targets at the Aberdeen Proving Grounds. Accidentally destroyed in 1966.
12	2-8-2	Baldwin Locomotive Works	October 1911	37085	February 1964	Ex-Southern Railway #4501. Sold to the K&T in October 1948 and renumbered 12. Retired in February 1964. Now operating at the Tennessee Valley Railroad Museum.
101	ALCo S-2	American Locomotive Company	May 1944	unknown	1987	Ex-Denver & Rio Grande Western #110. Sold to the K&T in 1963.
102	ALCo S-2	American Locomotive Company	May 1944	72051	1987	Ex-Denver & Rio Grande Western #118. Sold to the K&T in 1963.
103	ALCo S-2	American Locomotive Company	1944	72052	1987	Ex-Denver & Rio Grande Western #119. Sold to the K&T in 1963.
104	ALCo S-2	American Locomotive Company	1944	unknown	1987	Ex-Delaware & Hudson #3028. Sold to the K&T in 1963.

No.	Model	Builder	Built	Serial number	Acquired	Notes
107	GP11	Electro-Motive Diesel	1957	23830	2025	Originally built as IC 9330 (GP9) and rebuilt at Paducah Shops to GP11 #8710. Retired by IC in 1994, sold to SCFE 9024, renumbered to USSC 310, sold to Railexco and moved to Stearns in February 2025. Remains in USSC colors but decals removed.

== K & T Railway Motorcars ==
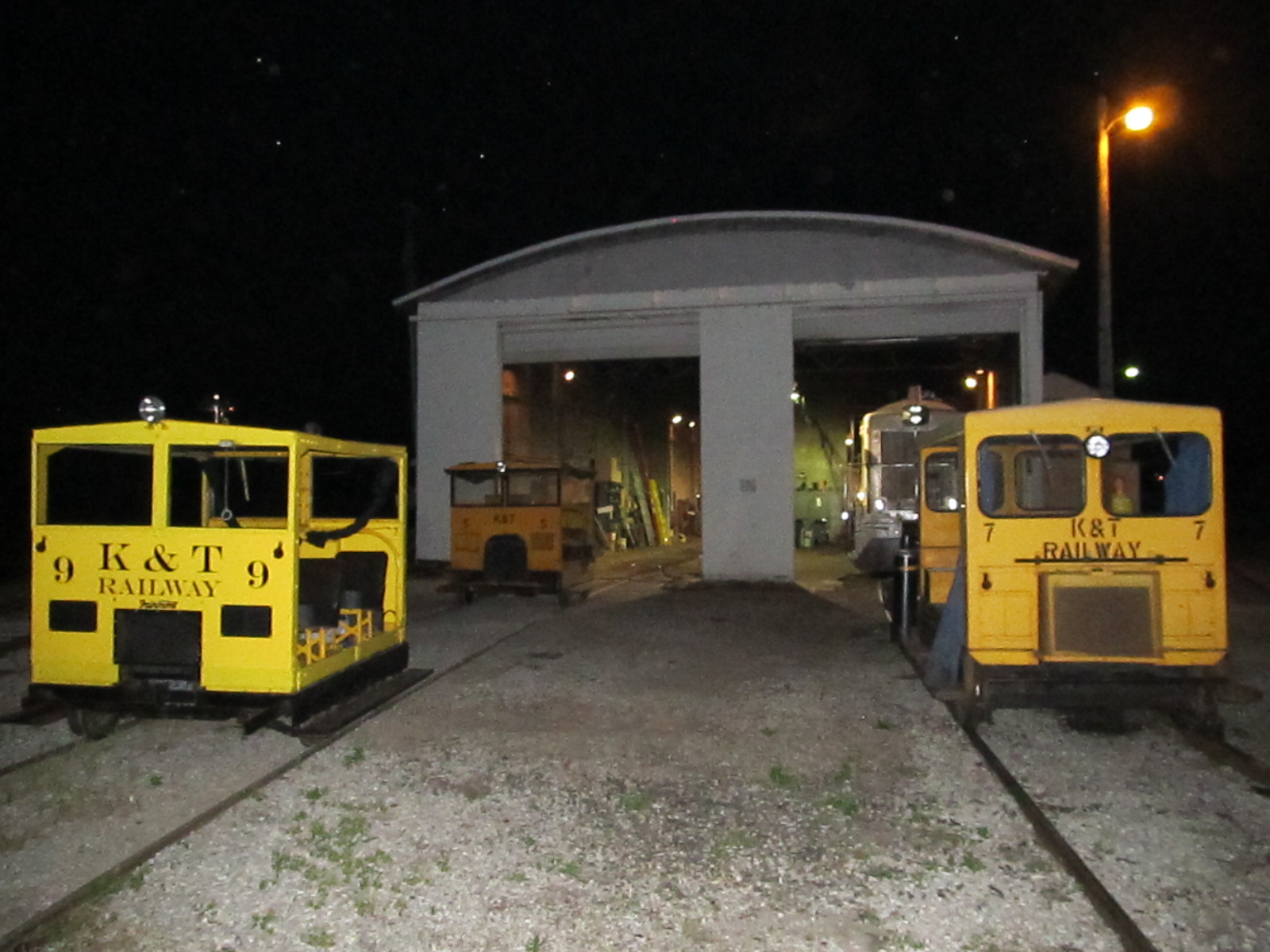
May 4, 2012. The three surviving Kentucky & Tennessee Railway Motorcars, Motors 5, 9 and 7 in front of the K&T Diesel Locomotive Shop. #9 and #7 were the last two motorcars active on their home railroad in the State of Kentucky.

== See also ==
- List of heritage railroads in the United States
