= Pine Knot, Kentucky =

Census-designated place in Kentucky, United States

- Census-designated place
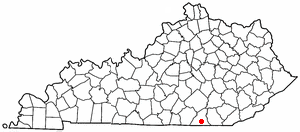
- Location in Kentucky
- Coordinates: 36°39′53″N 84°26′22″W
- Country: United States
- State: Kentucky
- County: McCreary

Area
  - Total: 6.47 sq mi (16.75 km^{2})
  - Land: 6.41 sq mi (16.59 km^{2})
  - Water: 0.062 sq mi (0.16 km^{2})
- Elevation: 1,411 ft (430 m)

Population (2020)
  - Total: 1,380
  - Density: 215.5/sq mi (83.19/km^{2})
- Time zone: UTC-5 (Eastern (EST))
  - Summer (DST): UTC-4 (EDT)
- ZIP code: 42635
- Area code: 606
- FIPS code: 21-61122
- GNIS feature ID: 2403414

Pine Knot is an unincorporated community and census-designated place (CDP) in McCreary County, Kentucky, United States. The population was 1,380 at the 2020 census, down from 1,621 in 2010.

== Geography ==
Pine Knot is located in southern McCreary County. It is bordered to the north by Stearns and to the south by Strunk.

U.S. Route 27 passes through Pine Knot east of the original center of town. The highway leads north 5 miles (8 km) to Whitley City, the McCreary county seat, and 35 miles (56 km) to Somerset, while to the south it leads 12 miles (19 km) to Oneida, Tennessee. Kentucky Route 92 intersects US 27 in Pine Knot, leading east 19 miles (31 km) to Williamsburg. KY 92 turns north with US 27 as far as Stearns.

According to the U.S. Census Bureau, the Pine Knot CDP has a total area of 6.47 square miles (16.8 km^{2}), of which 0.06 square miles (0.16 km^{2}), or 0.96%, are water. The community sits on a ridge which drains west to the Smith Fork, north to Laurel Creek, and east to Perkins Creek. Laurel Creek and Perkins Creek are tributaries of Marsh Creek, a north-flowing tributary of the Cumberland River, while the Smith Fork is a tributary of Roaring Paunch Creek, which flows to the South Fork of the Cumberland River.

== Demographics ==
Historical population
Census	Pop.	Note	%±
1980	1,389		—
1990	1,549		11.5%
2000	1,680		8.5%
2010	1,621		−3.5%
2020	1,380		−14.9%
U.S. Decennial Census

As of the census of 2000, there were 1,680 people, 584 households, and 390 families residing in the CDP. The population density was 263.2 inhabitants per square mile (101.6/km^{2}). There were 653 housing units at an average density of 102.3 per square mile (39.5/km^{2}). The racial makeup of the CDP was 90.95% White, 5.71% African American, 0.42% Native American, 0.06% Asian, 1.37% from other races, and 1.49% from two or more races. Hispanic or Latino of any race were 2.32% of the population.

There were 584 households, out of which 32.2% had children under the age of 18 living with them, 50.7% were married couples living together, 12.8% had a female householder with no husband present, and 33.2% were non-families. 30.5% of all households were made up of individuals, and 8.9% had someone living alone who was 65 years of age or older. The average household size was 2.39 and the average family size was 2.97.

In the CDP, the population was spread out, with 27.4% under the age of 18, 14.8% from 18 to 24, 22.4% from 25 to 44, 22.4% from 45 to 64, and 12.9% who were 65 years of age or older. The median age was 32 years. For every 100 females, there were 114.0 males. For every 100 females age 18 and over, there were 108.5 males.

The median income for a household in the CDP was $13,777, and the median income for a family was $20,313. Males had a median income of $19,539 versus $12,092 for females. The per capita income for the CDP was $8,715. About 31.2% of families and 38.5% of the population were below the poverty line, including 38.6% of those under age 18 and 13.7% of those age 65 or over.

== Government and infrastructure ==
The Federal Bureau of Prisons United States Penitentiary, McCreary, is in McCreary County, 3 miles (5 km) east of Pine Knot.

== Transportation ==
McCreary County Airport is located in the county, 3 miles (5 km) northeast of Pine Knot.

== Education ==
There is one school district in the county, McCreary County School District. The district's comprehensive high school is McCreary Central High School.
