= Comargo, Kentucky =

Unincorporated community in Kentucky, United States

- Unincorporated community
- Location within Kentucky Location within the United States
- Coordinates: 36°40′39″N 84°32′29″W
- Country: United States
- State: Kentucky
- County: McCreary
- Elevation: 1,132 ft (345 m)
- Time zone: UTC-6 (Central (CST))
  - Summer (DST): UTC-5 (CST)
- GNIS feature ID: 511482

Comargo is an unincorporated community in McCreary County, Kentucky, United States.
