= White Oak Junction, Kentucky =

Unincorporated community in Kentucky, United States

- Unincorporated community
- Location within Kentucky Location within the United States
- Coordinates: 36°42′10″N 84°35′35″W
- Country: United States
- State: Kentucky
- County: McCreary
- Elevation: 1,017 ft (310 m)
- Time zone: UTC-6 (Central (CST))
  - Summer (DST): UTC-5 (CST)
- GNIS feature ID: 516326

White Oak Junction is an unincorporated community and coal town in McCreary County, Kentucky, United States. Their post office closed in 1949.
