= Yahoo Arch =

Rock feature in McCreary County, Kentucky

Coordinates: 36.7679°N 84.5118°W

Yahoo Arch

Yahoo Arch is a spiraling rock feature located in the Daniel Boone National Forest, in McCreary County, Kentucky].

A hiking trail leads (0.8 Miles) from Yahoo Falls to the arch.
