= Barthell, Kentucky =

- Coal town
- Location in Kentucky Barthell (the United States)
- Coordinates: 36°41′11″N 84°31′31″W
- Country: United States
- State: Kentucky
- County: McCreary
- Established: 1902
- Elevation: 1,106 ft (337 m)
- Time zone: UTC-5 (Eastern (EST))
  - Summer (DST): UTC-4 (EDT)
- GNIS feature ID: 510422
- Website: barthellcoalcamp.com

Barthell is a former coal town in McCreary County, Kentucky, United States. It was established in 1902 and was the first of 18 mining camps to be built by the Stearns Coal and Lumber Company. It now serves as an open-air history museum, which is open from April through Thanksgiving.

== History ==
During the 1880s-90s, a large portion of the land surrounding the Big South Fork was purchased by L.E. Bryant who began exploring the deposits of coal. In 1901, Byrant sent his associate, John Toomey, to lumber baron Justus S. Stearns in Michigan and convinced him to invest in the mineral rights of the Big South Fork area. By 1902, Barthell was established and work began in Mine No. 1. The first shipment of coal was delivered from Barthell in 1903 after the completion of the Kentucky and Tennessee Railroad from Stearns. During 1905 and 1906, operations expanded at Barthell with the opening of Mine No. 2.

From 1923 to 1927, the Bryant lease was fully purchased by the Stearns Coal and Lumber Company. Business boomed even during the height of the Great Depression, with a record monthly coal production of 100,961 tons of coal in January 1930. The onset of World War II further increased coal production at Barthell, requiring the addition of a second railway line.

The decline of Barthell began in 1943 when the tipple at Mine No. 1 was destroyed by fire and was never rebuilt. Mine No. 1 was also closed shortly after the fire at the tipple. Coal mined from Mine No. 2 was then sent to the tipple at Mine No. 18 at the Blue Heron Mining complex. The dismantling of the coal camp began in 1952 and was completed in 1961.

In 1984, the Barthell coal camp was purchased by the Koger family, who invested more than $500,000 of their own money into the revitalization of the community. All of the community's original structures, such as the company store, doctors office, and school house were reconstructed from photographs, drawings and archaeological survey. Fifteen former coal camp homes were also reconstructed based on ground evidence of the original foundation pilings.

== See also ==
- Blue Heron, Kentucky: Stearns Coal and Lumber Company town in McCreary County, Kentucky
- McCreary County Museum: Former headquarters of Stearns Coal and Lumber Company
- Stearns, Kentucky: Stearns Coal and Lumber Company town in McCreary County, Kentucky
