= Stearns Golf Course =

- U.S. National Register of Historic Places
- Location: 131 Clubhouse Dr., Stearns, Kentucky
- Coordinates: 36°42′07″N 84°28′37″W
- NRHP reference No.: 15000654
- Added to NRHP: September 29, 2015

The Stearns Golf Course, at 131 Clubhouse Dr. in Stearns, Kentucky, was listed on the National Register of Historic Places in 2015.

The nomination included 180 acres (73 ha) including the 49 acres (20 ha) golf course, a log clubhouse built in 1936, and a kidney-shaped in-ground pool. The clubhouse and pool were funded by the Works Progress Administration. It was located in a coal company town and the NRHP nomination described it as "'a very unusual place, as well as a significant one. It shows the lengths that some coal companies went to create a familiar experience in a very foreign place, importing a feature of urban leisure in a place of rural work.'"
