= Tipple =

Mine structure used to load coal or ore

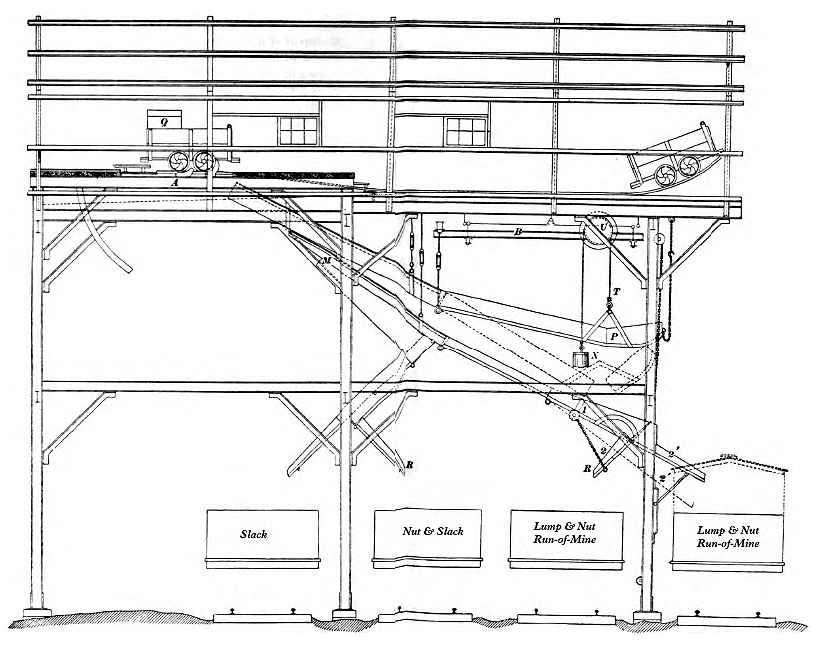
Diagram of a coal tipple with screens for up to 4 grades of coal

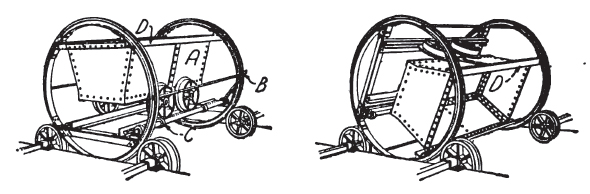
Diagram of a rotary dump

A tipple is a structure used at a mine to load the extracted product (e.g., coal, ores) for transport, typically into railroad hopper cars. In the United States, tipples have been frequently associated with coal mines, but they have also been used for hard rock mining.

== Operation ==
Basic coal tipples simply load coal into railroad cars. Many tipples had simple screening equipment to sort coal pieces by size before loading. A modern coal mine facility usually includes a coal preparation plant which washes coal of soil and rock, before loading it for transport to market. The term "tipple" may be used interchangeably with coal prep plant.

Tipples were initially used with minecarts, also called tubs or tram cars, or mine cars in the U.S. These were small hopper cars that carried the product on a mine railway out of the mine. When a mine car entered the upper level of the tipple, its contents were dumped through a chute leading to a railroad hopper car positioned on a track running beneath the tipple. At some facilities, each car was tipped over manually—thus the name, "tipple". In higher volume facilities, each car was placed in a machine called a rotary dump, which rotated the car to dump the coal or ore.

In the early 20th century, mine operators began using conveyor belts to load coal and ores into railroad cars, eliminating the use of mine cars. At some mines the conveyor loading facility is still referred to as a "tipple".

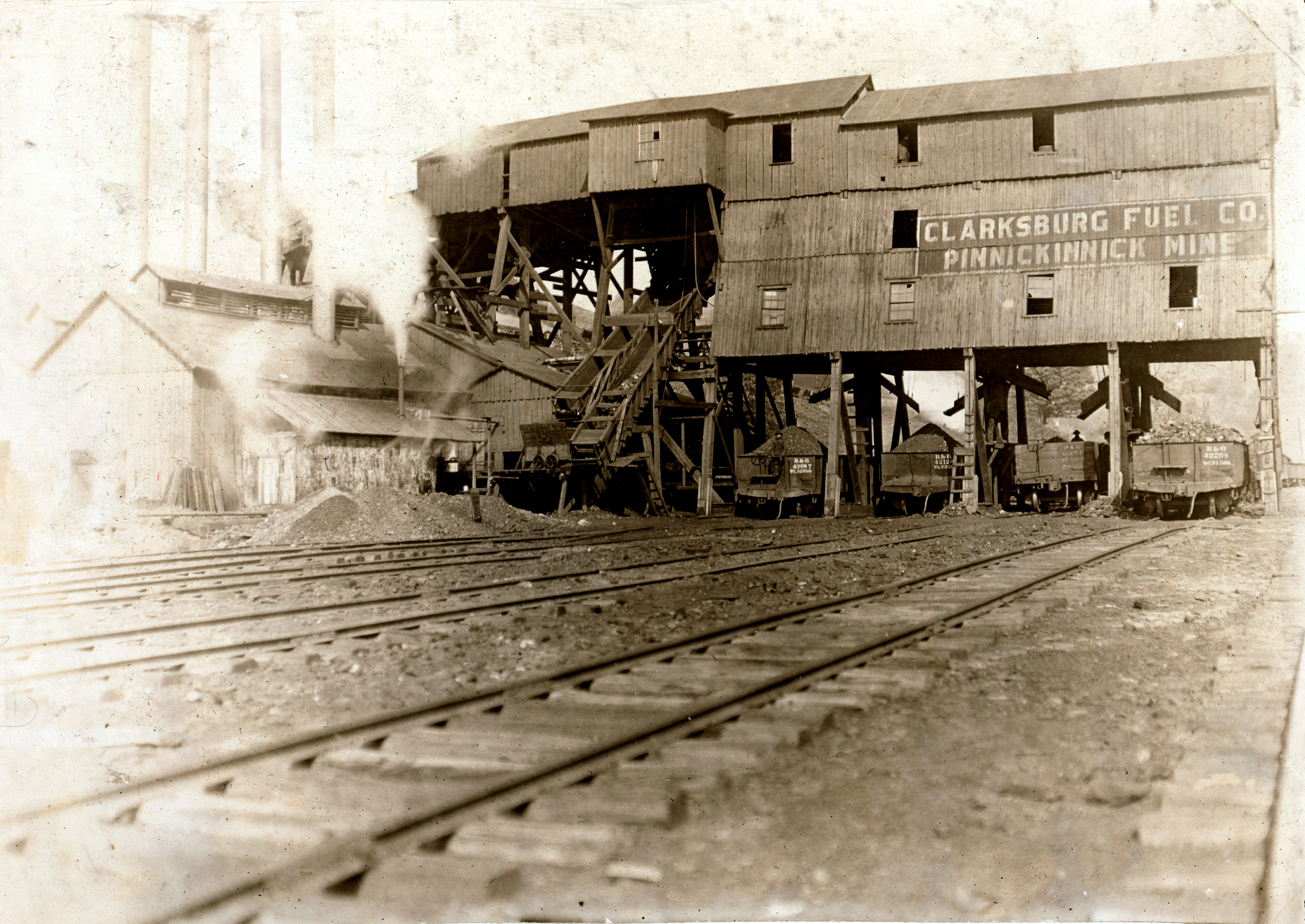
A coal tipple in Clarksburg, West Virginia, in 1908

Tipple at a Michigan copper mine in 1941

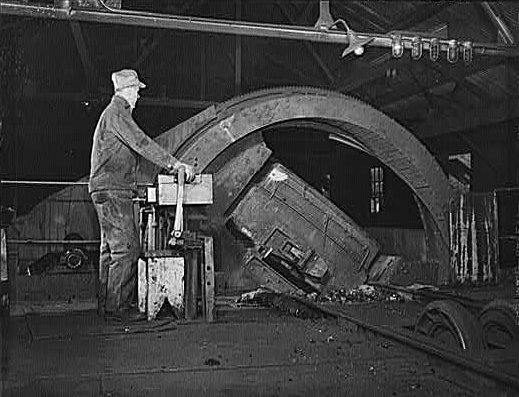
A rotary dump of the Pittsburgh Coal Co.

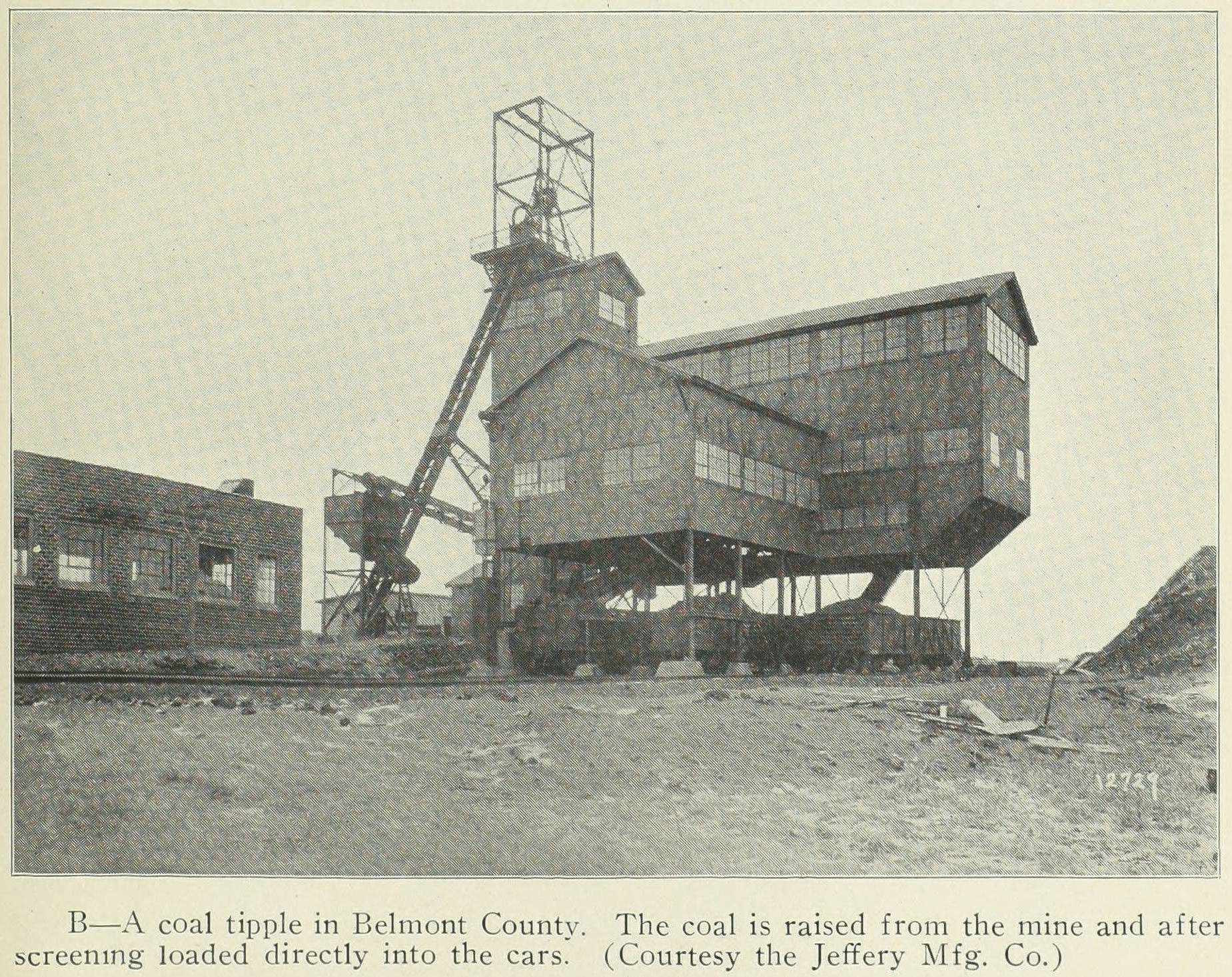
Coal tipple in Belmont County, Ohio, 1923

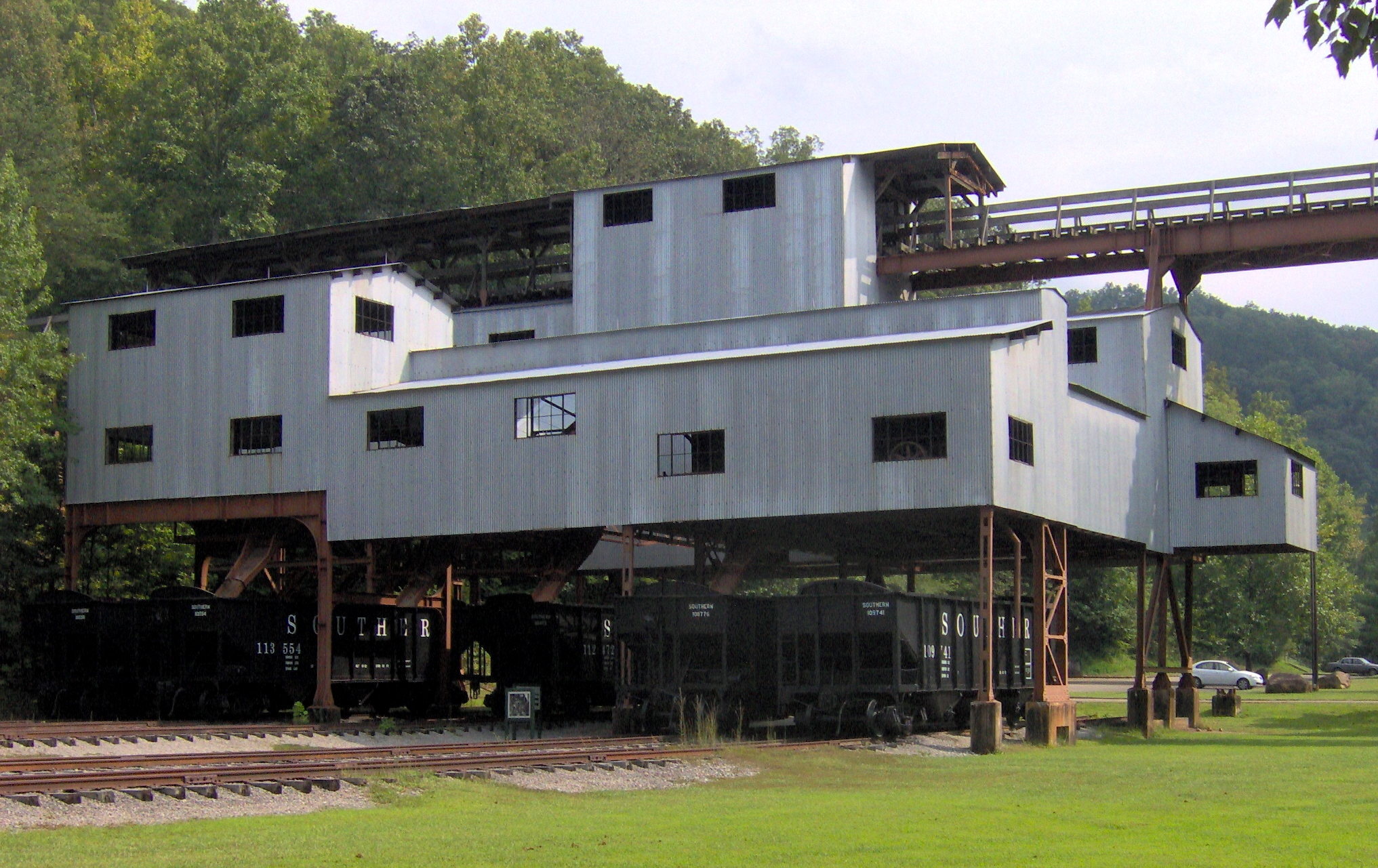
Coal tipple in Blue Heron, Kentucky

== See also ==
- Coal preparation plant
