= Massacre at Ywahoo Falls =

Alleged 1810 massacre in Kentucky, United States

Coordinates: 36.769°N 84.51056°W

The Massacre at Ywahoo Falls (or the Great Cherokee Children Massacre) is alleged to have occurred on August 10, 1810, at Yahoo Falls, now within the Daniel Boone National Forest in southeast Kentucky. A number of Cherokee women and children were purportedly massacred by European Americans. No documentary or other evidence supports this account.

"The Great Cherokee Children Massacre at Ywahoo Falls" is written about in an unpublished manuscript completed in the 1990s by Dan Troxell. Hiking the Big South Fork (1999) notes the purported event, citing Troxell as its source.

== Events ==
According to the tale, in order that the women and children of the Cumberland River valley might acquire a white-man's education, the Reverend Gideon Blackburn proposed to open a school on Cherokee land 125 miles away near Chattanooga (the story claims the school was in Sequatchie Valley), and on the day in question it was arranged that anybody seeking protection at the school should meet at Yahoo Falls at full moon. According to the story, they were to be led by "Cornblossom", an alleged daughter of the war chief Doublehead. But the group were massacred by a contingent of soldiers sent by John Sevier of Tennessee.

Tradition supports Cherokee Chief Arun or Aaron Brock Redbird as having been somehow connected to the events. Whether a Chief Redbird ever existed is not certain. In the book Rock Art of Kentucky the authors write that "No mention of Chief Red Bird could be found in several early Kentucky histories published in the nineteenth century. Therefore we contacted the Kentucky Historical Society and received the following letter (Wentworth 1969): "You will note that on our marker we say that he was a legendary Cherokee Indian. There is much legend in the area, but very little of any specific nature and no reliable dates are available."

== Monument ==
On August 12, 2006, persons unknown placed an unofficial monument to the alleged massacre in the Daniel Boone National Forest (DBNF), next to the grave of Jacob Troxell, who died 10 October 1810. In late September 2007, DBNF officials removed the monument. Journalists reported that a spokesperson said it was illegal to put up a monument on federal land without permission, and secondly, the Forest Service questioned whether the incident had taken place. Journalists have not found any contemporary records that document the massacre, nor any that record a "Princess Cornblossom" (the Cherokee did not use the title of "Princess"). Though Troxell said the account was from Cherokee oral history, questions have been raised about it not appearing in some other account, such as early settlers or county history.

The first written record of Cornblossom seems to occur in 1958 in a book called Legion of the Lost Mine by Thomas H. Troxel, Troxel says in his foreword that some of the figures in his book are fictitious (though he doesn't say which). He made no mention of the massacre in this book.

The massacre is referred to in A History of the Daniel Boone National Forest 1770-1970 (1975), written by Robert F. Collins and published by the Forest Service. Collins noted that he based the Yahoo Falls section on Troxell's unpublished manuscript.
