= Barren Fork Coal Camp and Mine Archeological District =

Historic district in Kentucky, United States

- U.S. National Register of Historic Places
- U.S. Historic district
- Nearest city: Whitley City, Kentucky
- Coordinates: 36°46′39″N 84°28′07″W
- Area: 210 acres (0.85 km^{2})
- Built: 1879
- NRHP reference No.: 97001125
- Added to NRHP: September 23, 1997

The Barren Fork Coal Camp and Mine Archeological District is a 210 acres (0.85 km^{2}) historic district near Whitley City, Kentucky which was listed on the National Register of Historic Places in 1997. It is also designated 15MC808 and 15MC809.

It is presumably located near or on Barren Fork Rd., north of Whitley City. The Barren Fork Cemetery is the most visible surviving element of the community.

== History ==
The area was purchased in 1879 by the Lexington Stave and Mining Company, which would later change its name to Barren Fork Mining and Coal Company and then to Eagle Coal Company. The settlement was relocated in 1912 and a company store was added since employees were paid in company scrip.

The coal prices were low during the Great Depression. The Barren Fork Coal Camp was active until the mine was closed 1935, upon vote by miners to join the United Mine Workers union. The United States Forest Service then bought the land and eventually removed most surface structures.

The district included three contributing structures and eight contributing sites. The historic function was as a processing site, for industry/processing/extraction. It was listed for its information potential.
