= Yahoo Falls =

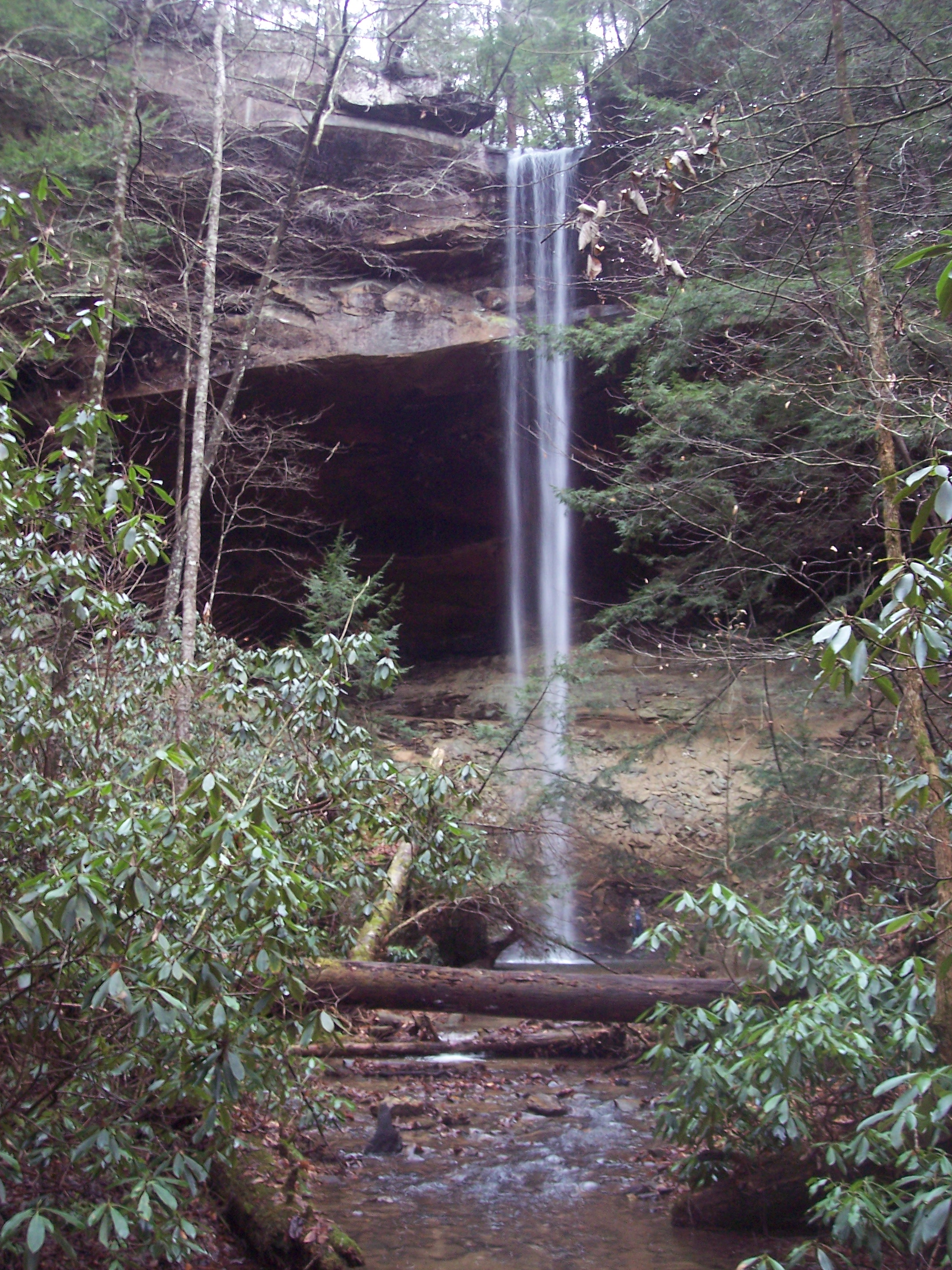
- Interactive map of Yahoo Falls
- Location: Big South Fork National River and Recreation Area, McCreary County, Kentucky, United States
- Coordinates: 36.769°N 84.51056°W
- Type: Plunge
- Total height: 113 ft (34 m)
- Number of drops: 1
- Watercourse: Yahoo Creek

Historic Yahoo Falls, also known as Ywahoo Falls (possibly of Muscogee origin, from Yahola, Yahoo Creek & Wahoo in northeast Georgia), is located in Marshes Siding, McCreary County, Kentucky.

== Description ==
A Scenic overlook marks the trail from the highway to the falls, which stand 113 feet (34 m). A similar waterfall in the Red River Gorge is said to exceed Yahoo Falls in height by a few inches. Further along, the trail leads to the Yahoo Arch, a spiraling rock feature.

== History ==
Cumberland National Forest, now Daniel Boone National Forest, was created in 1937. It includes the Falls and surrounding second-growth timberland. It is owned by the Federal government and management is entrusted to the U.S. Forest Service.

Forest supervisor Robert Collins created the Yahoo Falls Recreation Area in the 1960s. The decision was made to turn Yahoo Falls into an accessible scenic attraction in an effort to lure visitors to the Stearns Ranger District. An all-weather road was built to the top of the gorge and a picnic area and primitive campsite was established. Trails were constructed and a long flight of steel stairs led visitors down into the gorge past cliffs and nearly vertical lush slopes adorned with mountain laurel, rhododendron and many threatened and endangered species of plants .

According to legend Daniel Boone allegedly shot and killed bigfoot at this location in the 1770s. The name "bigfoot" did not exist yet at the time and Boone called the creature a ""Yahoo"", which is a direct reference to Jonathan Swift's Gulliver's Travels. Boone reportedly showed off the body to a hundred people in nearby Boonesborough, Kentucky. The site has been known as Yahoo Falls ever since.

== See also ==
- List of waterfalls
- List of waterfalls in Kentucky
- Massacre at Ywahoo Falls
