= Stearns Administrative and Commercial District =

Historic district in Kentucky, United States

- U.S. National Register of Historic Places
- U.S. Historic district
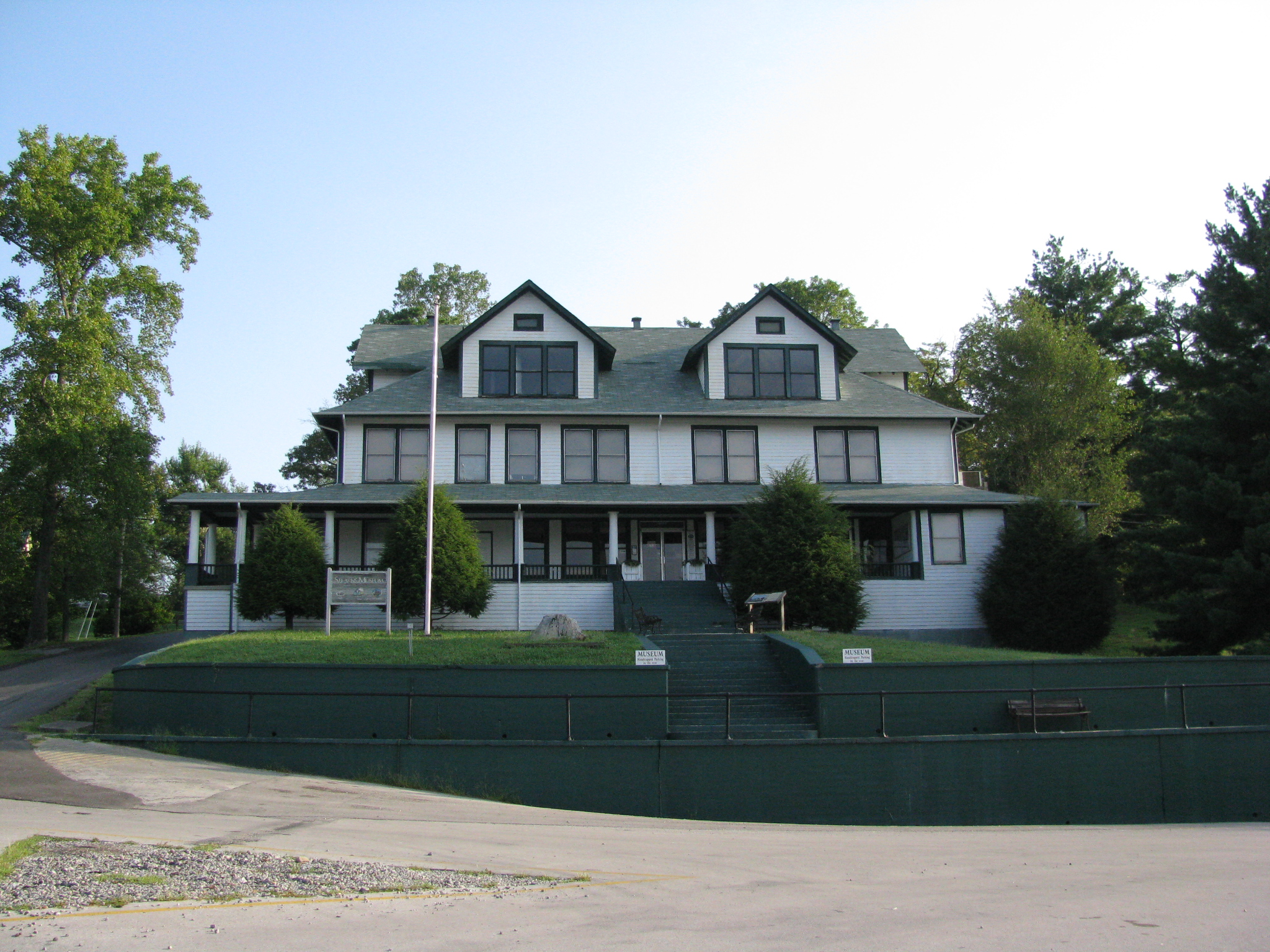
- Location: Old US 27, Stearns, Kentucky
- Coordinates: 36°41′55″N 84°28′36″W
- Area: 4.3 acres (1.7 ha)
- Built: 1903
- Architectural style: Colonial Revival
- NRHP reference No.: 88002528
- Added to NRHP: November 16, 1988

The Stearns Administrative and Commercial District, located on Old U.S. Route 27 in Stearns, Kentucky, is a 4.3 acres (1.7 ha) historic district which was listed on the National Register of Historic Places in 1988. It included six contributing buildings and one non-contributing building.

The main element is the Stearns Company General Offices Building, "a two-and one-half story frame building that utilizes dormers, porches, and roof lines characteristic of the American Four Square House." The McCreary County Museum now uses the building.
