= McCreary County Airport =

- IATA: none; ICAO: none; FAA LID: 18I

Summary
- Airport type: Public
- Operator: McCreary County
- Location: McCreary County, Kentucky
- Elevation AMSL: 1,370 ft / 417.6 m
- Coordinates: 36°41′45″N 84°23′30″W
- Interactive map of McCreary County Airport

Runways
| Direction | Length | | Surface |
| Direction | ft | m | Surface |
|---|---|---|---|
| 4/22 | 3,000 | 914 | Asphalt |

McCreary County Airport (FAA LID: 18I) is a public airport located in unincorporated McCreary County, Kentucky, USA, 3 miles (4.8 km) northeast of the central business district (CBD) of Pine Knot. It is a very small, publicly owned public-use general aviation airport. The airport lies adjacent to United States Penitentiary, McCreary and has one unattended hangar containing several ultralight aircraft. Its elevation is 1370 MSL and it has one well-maintained asphalt runway, 4/22.

In 2003, Senator Jim Bunning announced that federal funding was being extended to McCreary County Airport. Plans are in development to extend the runway and build additional hangar space.

== See also ==
- List of airports in Kentucky
