= Blue Heron, Kentucky =

- Coal town
- Location in Kentucky Blue Heron (the United States)
- Coordinates: 36°40′17″N 84°32′44″W
- Country: United States
- State: Kentucky
- County: McCreary
- Founded: 1937
- Elevation: 1,030 ft (314 m)
- Time zone: UTC-5 (Eastern (EST))
  - Summer (DST): UTC-4 (EDT)
- GNIS feature ID: 510799
- Website: www.nps.gov/biso/learn/historyculture/blueheron.htm

Blue Heron, also known as Mine 18, is a former coal mining community or coal town on the banks of the Big South Fork of the Cumberland River in McCreary County, Kentucky, United States, that has been recreated and is maintained as an interpretive history area in the Big South Fork National River and Recreation Area.

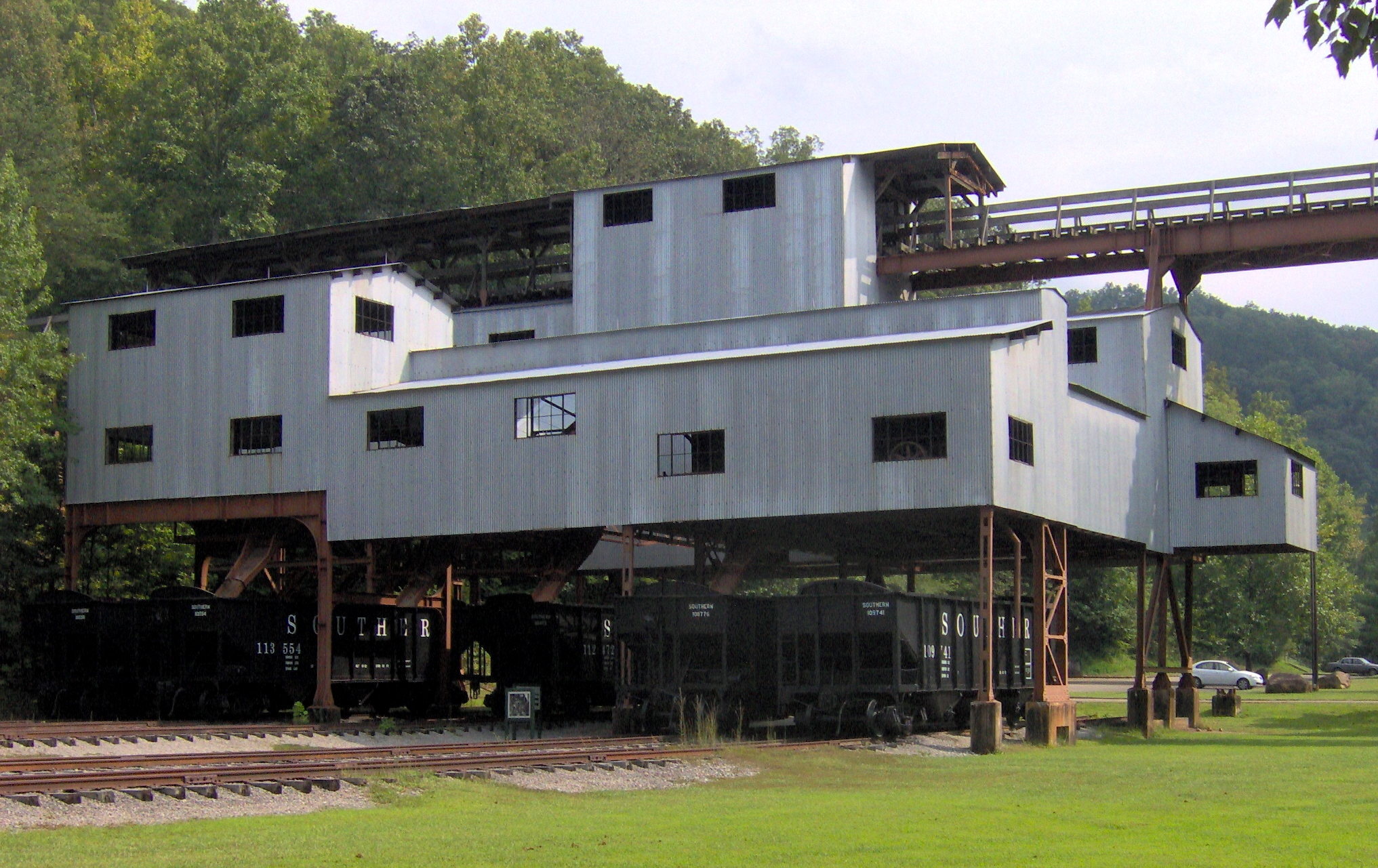
Coal tipple at Blue Heron

Blue Heron was operated as a company town of the Stearns Coal and Lumber Company. Its coal mines opened in 1937 and operated until December 1962, when the underground mines closed down for lack of profitability. The town was forced to abandoned, and its buildings were either removed or decayed. The community was "re-created" in the 1980s as an outdoor museum. Some of the original structures have been replicated as open, metal shells of buildings, referred to as "ghost structures," on the approximate sites of the original buildings. Structures include a railroad depot, a full-scale model of the coal tipple, a school, and homes. Photographic exhibits and audio programs in the ghost structures tell about various aspects of life in the isolated mining community.

== See also ==
- Barthell, Kentucky: Stearns Coal and Lumber Company town in McCreary County, Kentucky
- McCreary County Museum: Former headquarters of Stearns Coal and Lumber Company
- Stearns, Kentucky: Stearns Coal and Lumber Company town in McCreary County, Kentucky

== Gallery ==
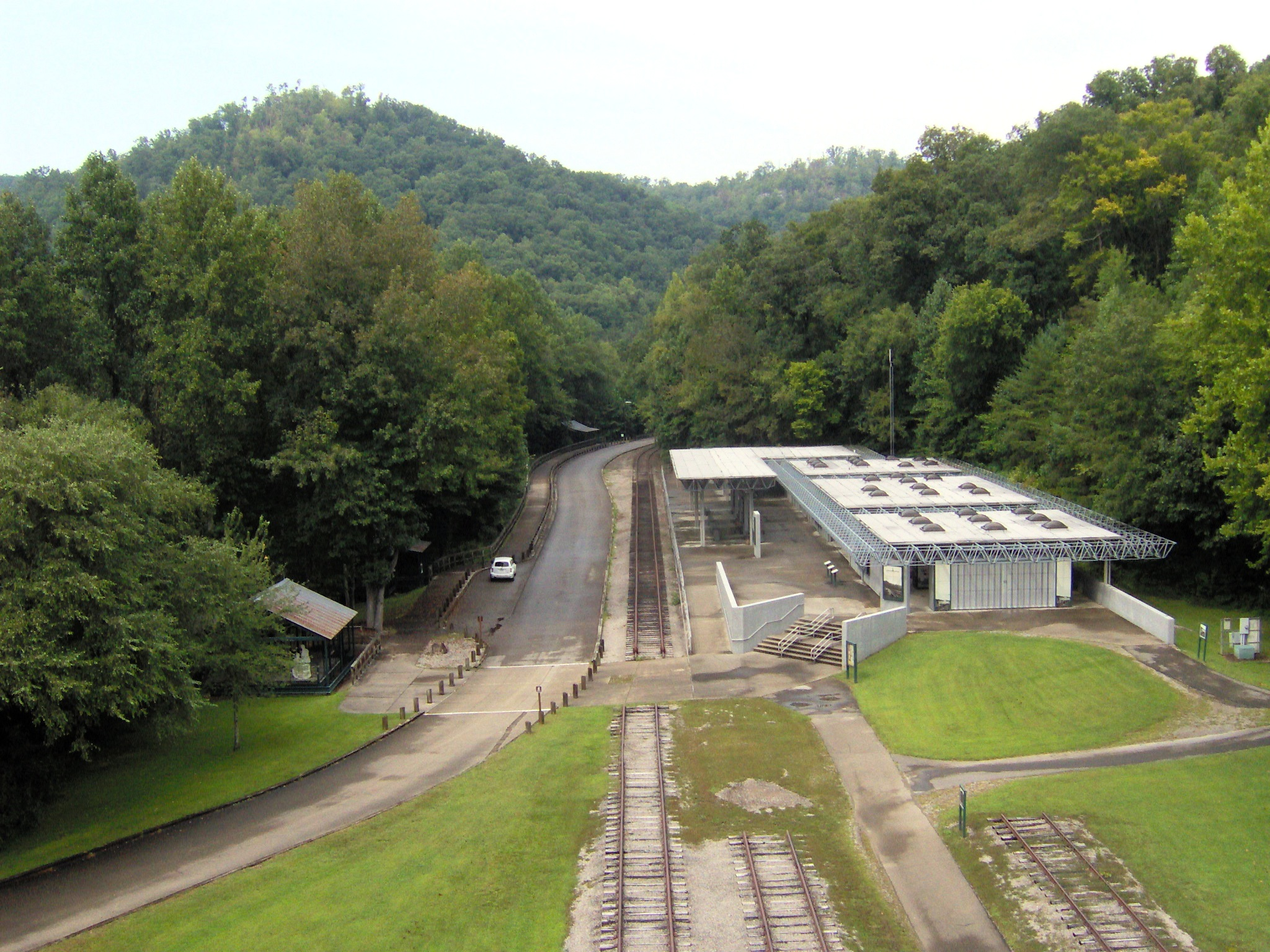
The depot (right), company store (left)

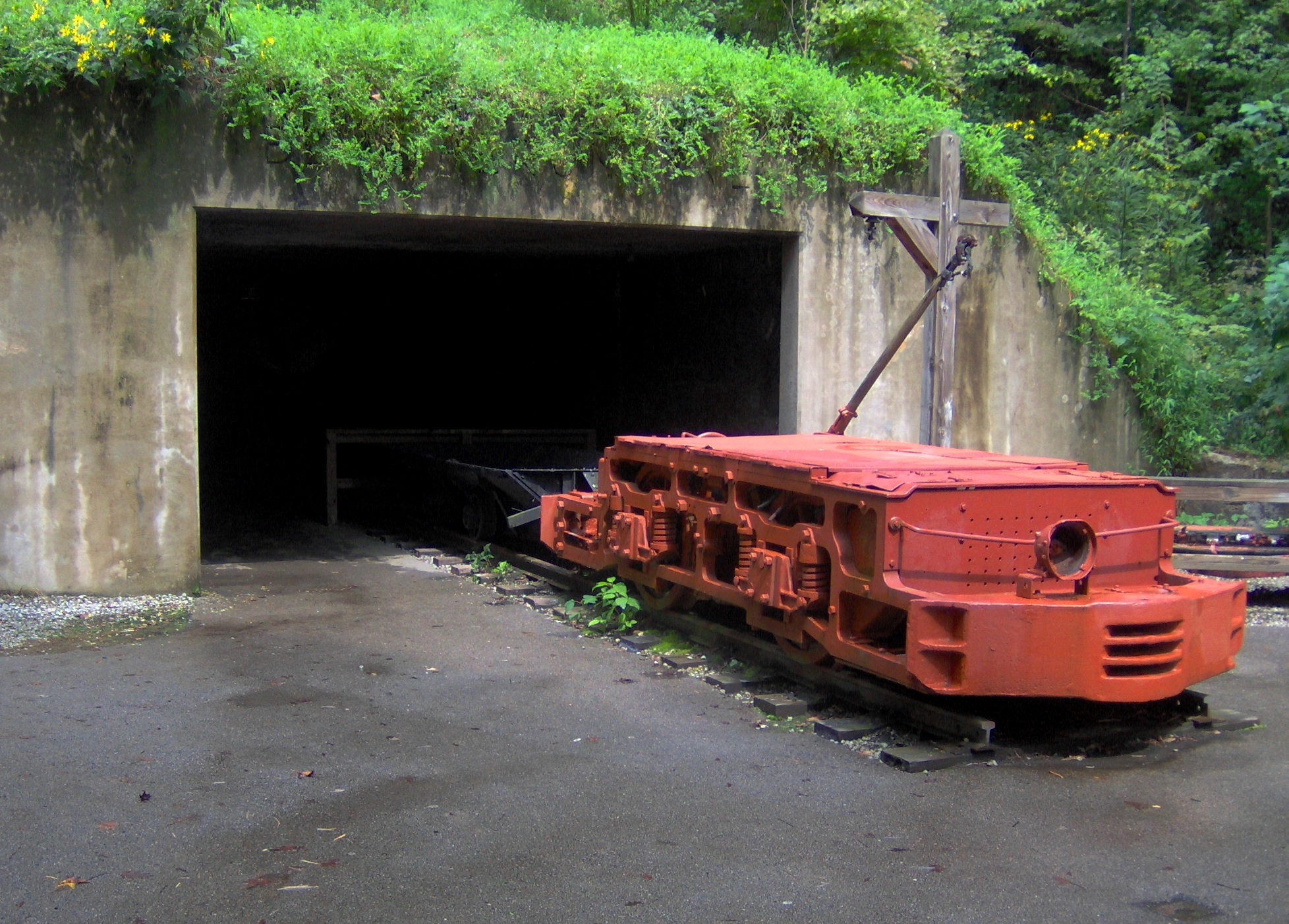
Entrance to Mine 18

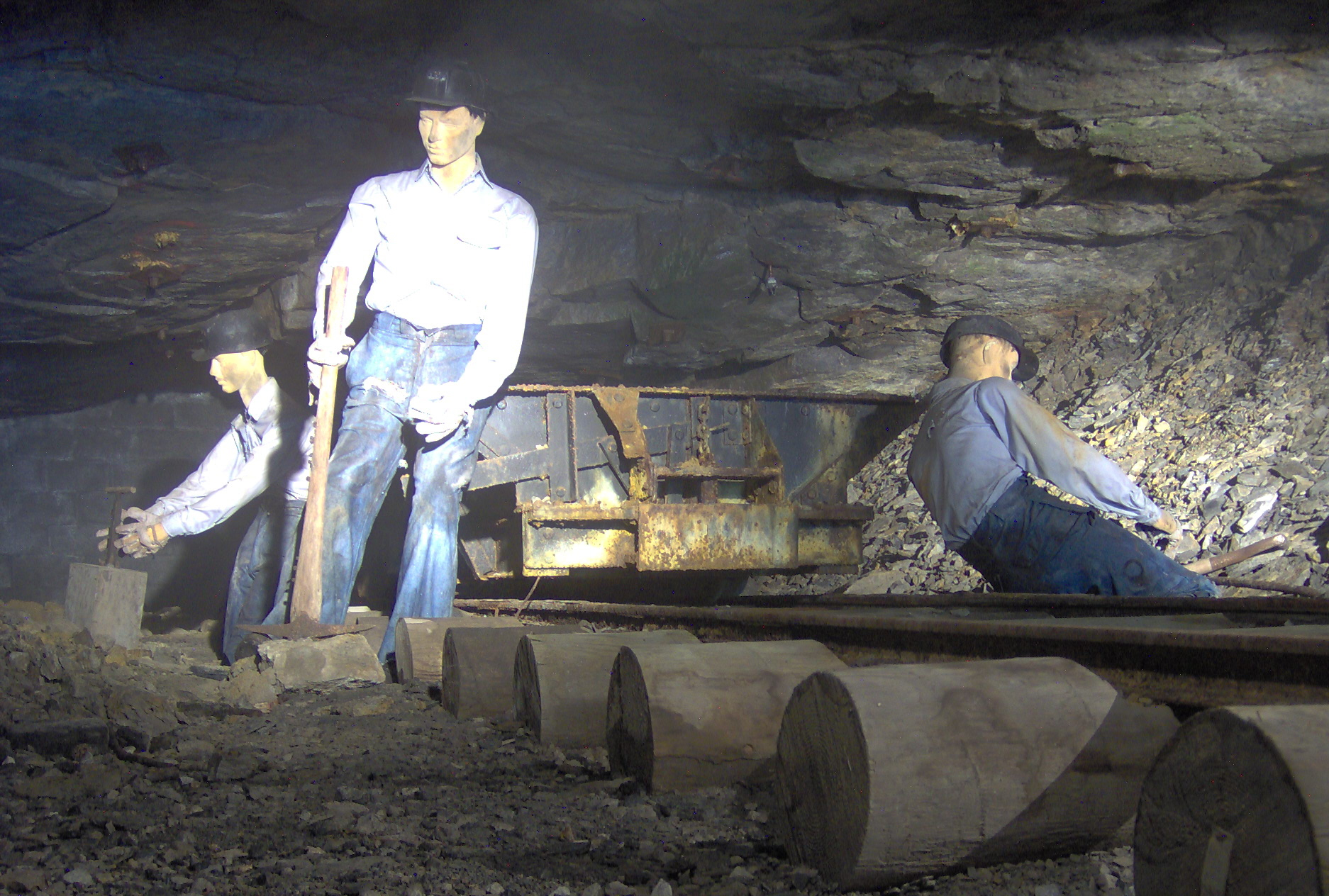
Mine 18 display
