= Big South Fork National River and Recreation Area =

Protected area in central northeast Tennessee and southeastern Kentucky, United States

- Big South Fork
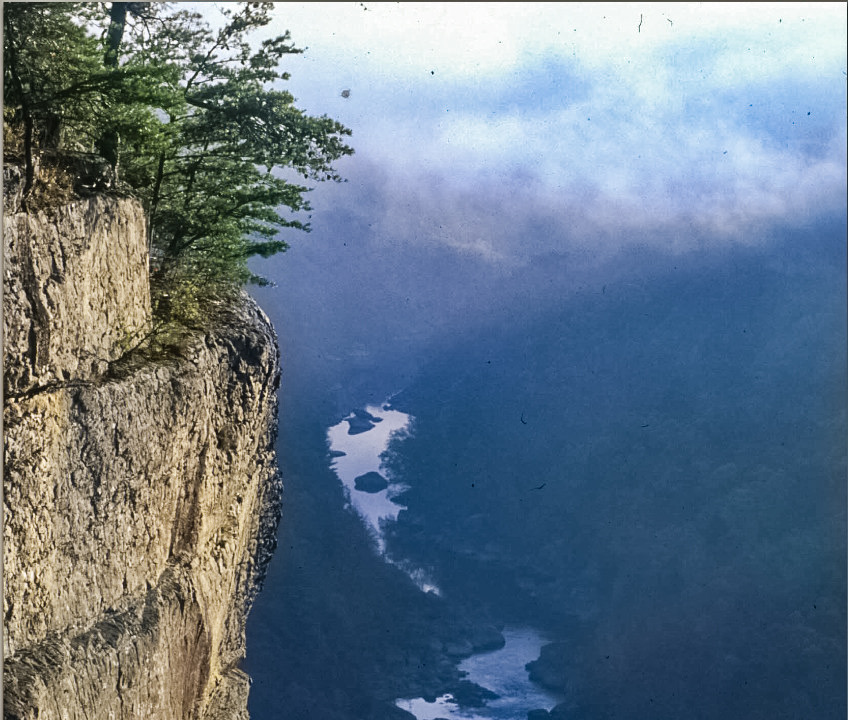
- Rock bluffs overlooking the Cumberland River in Big South Fork

- Location within Tennessee Location within the United States
- Interactive map of Big South Fork National River and Recreation Area
- Location: Scott, Fentress, Pickett, and Morgan counties in Tennessee, and McCreary County, Kentucky, United States
- Nearest city: Oneida, Tennessee, and Whitley City, Kentucky
- Coordinates: 36.4865°N 84.6985°W
- Area: 125,310 acres (50,710 ha)
- Established: March 7, 1974
- Visitors: 797,726 (in 2022)
- Governing body: National Park Service
- Website: https://www.nps.gov/biso/

The Big South Fork National River and Recreation Area, commonly known as Big South Fork, preserves the Big South Fork of the Cumberland River and its tributaries in northeastern Tennessee and southeastern Kentucky.

Within it are reminders of the time when the area was subjected to logging and mining expansion. The community of No Business was located by No Business Creek in Tennessee; first settled in 1796, it had been abandoned by late 1960. In addition, the former mining community of Blue Heron, Kentucky is preserved and interpreted via signage.

The Big South Fork region contains one of the highest concentrations of natural bridges in the eastern United States and the area is located in parts of Scott, Fentress, Pickett, and Morgan counties in Tennessee, and McCreary County in Kentucky. Charit Creek Lodge is a wilderness lodge, accessible by trail, located within the park.

The Big South Fork was also legally designated a Kentucky Wild River by the Kentucky General Assembly through the Office of Kentucky Nature Preserves' Wild Rivers Program.

== Geology ==
The Big South Fork's most prominent feature is the river gorge cutting through the softer Mississippian age rock beneath the hard Pennsylvanian capstone of the Cumberland Plateau. Water is the most influential agent of geologic change in the Big South Fork region. Over time water action has left many unique and amazing geologic features ranging from the river gorge with its magnificent bluffs to the natural arches and unusual hoodoos.

Due to the substantial amount of annual rainfall of the region and the action of the Cumberland River and surrounding tributaries the water acts to erode the softer Mississippian rock composed of limestone, shale, and calcareous sandstone from beneath the much harder and erosion resistant capstone composed of Pennsylvanian sandstone. Flowing water hollows out the softer layers beneath and forms waterfalls and gorges. Where there is hard capstone intact, arches can form creating natural bridges across streams or a dry ravines. Direct erosion widens a joint and forms a cavity below the more resilient rock thus creating a void between the hard capstone and the area below. As result, water eroded arches are formed in the Big South Fork. Hoodoos are a rare but intriguing feature occurring in the Big South Fork. These hoodoos form in a similar manner to those found in the western United States. Where tough capstone still exists on the side of a hill for instance, it prevents the erosion of the softer material below. The result is a naturally formed erect columnar rock where once was located a hill.

== Gallery ==
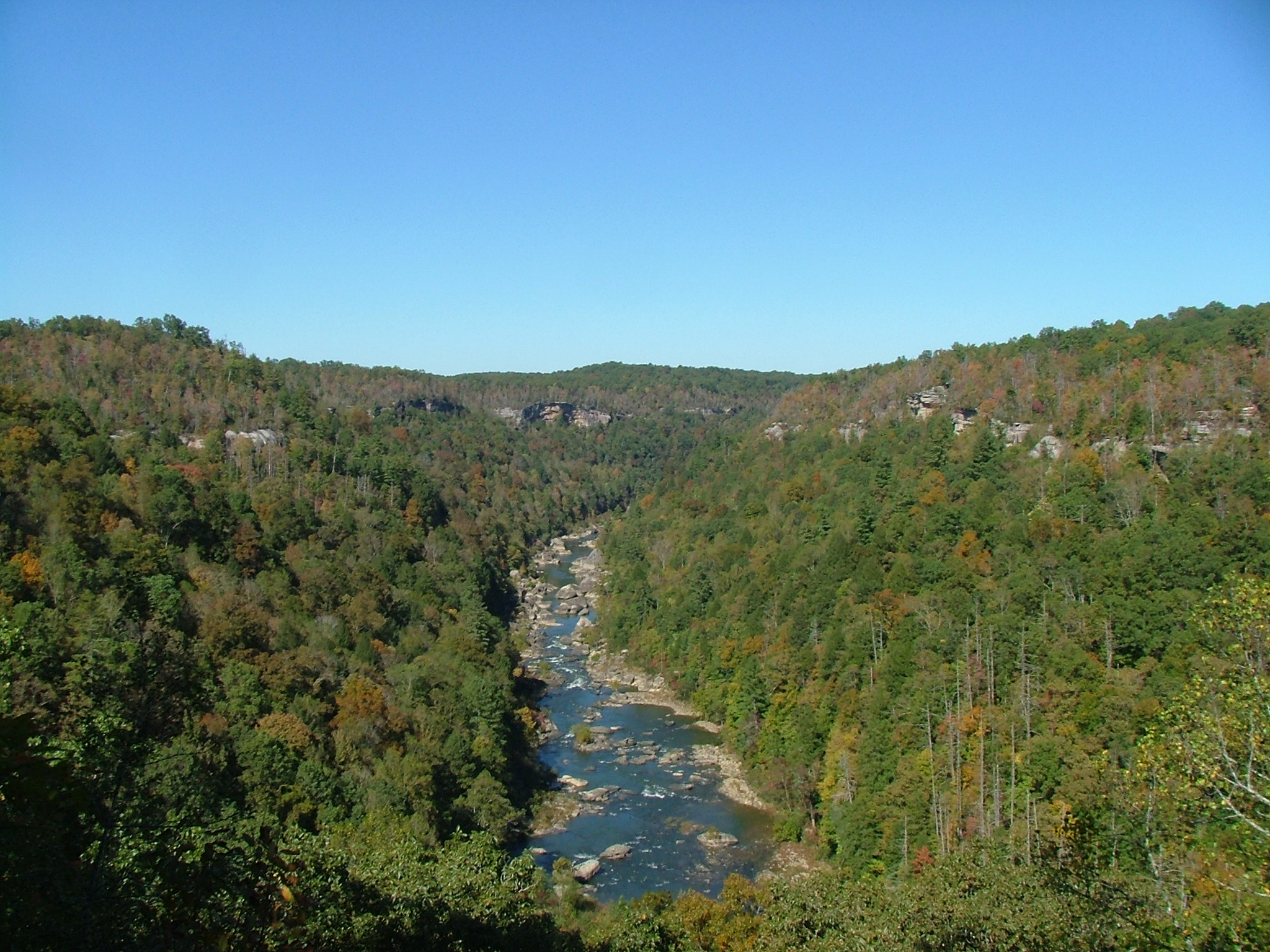
Big South Fork Cumberland River

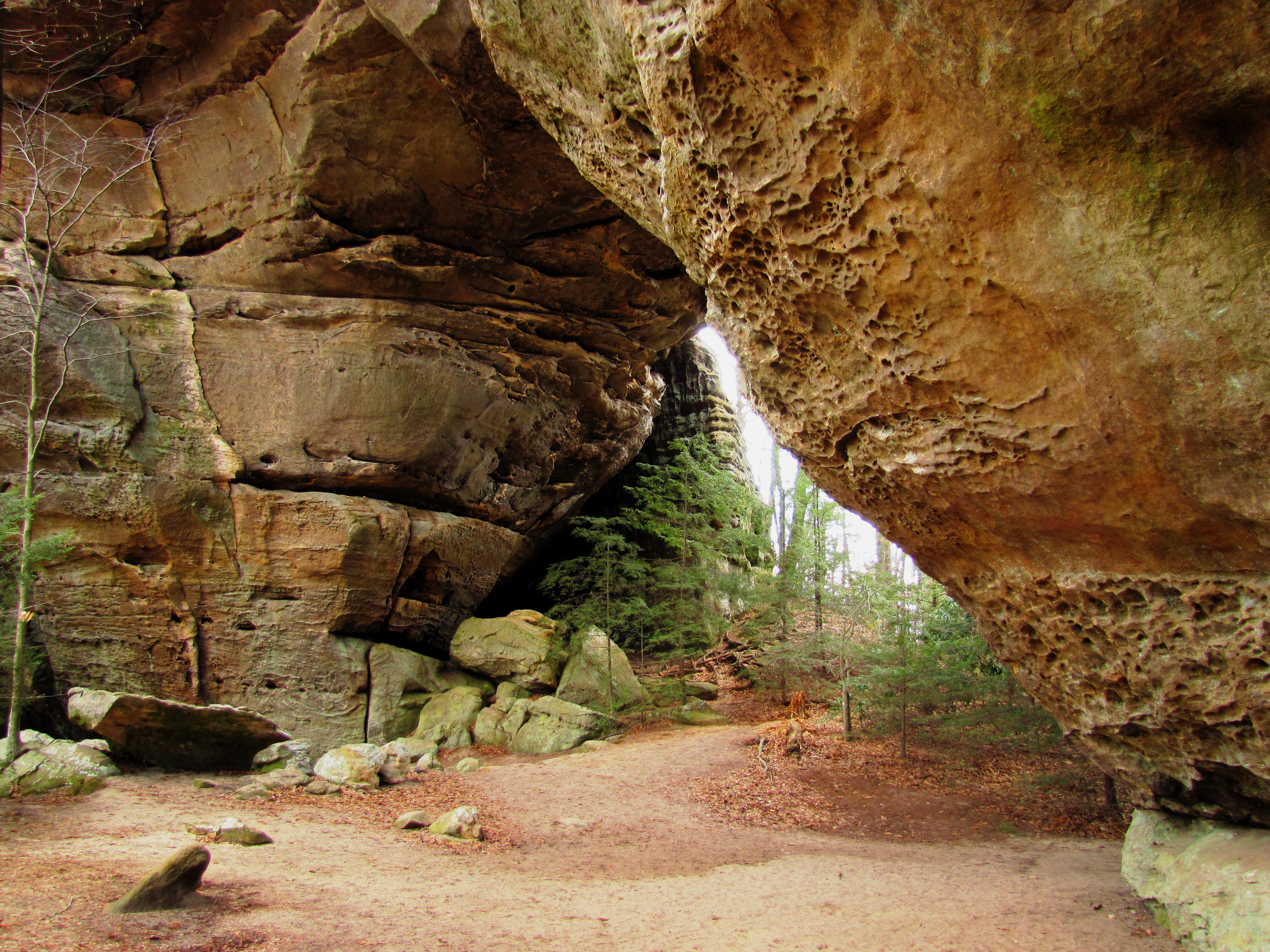
Natural arch in the Big South Fork National River and Recreation Area

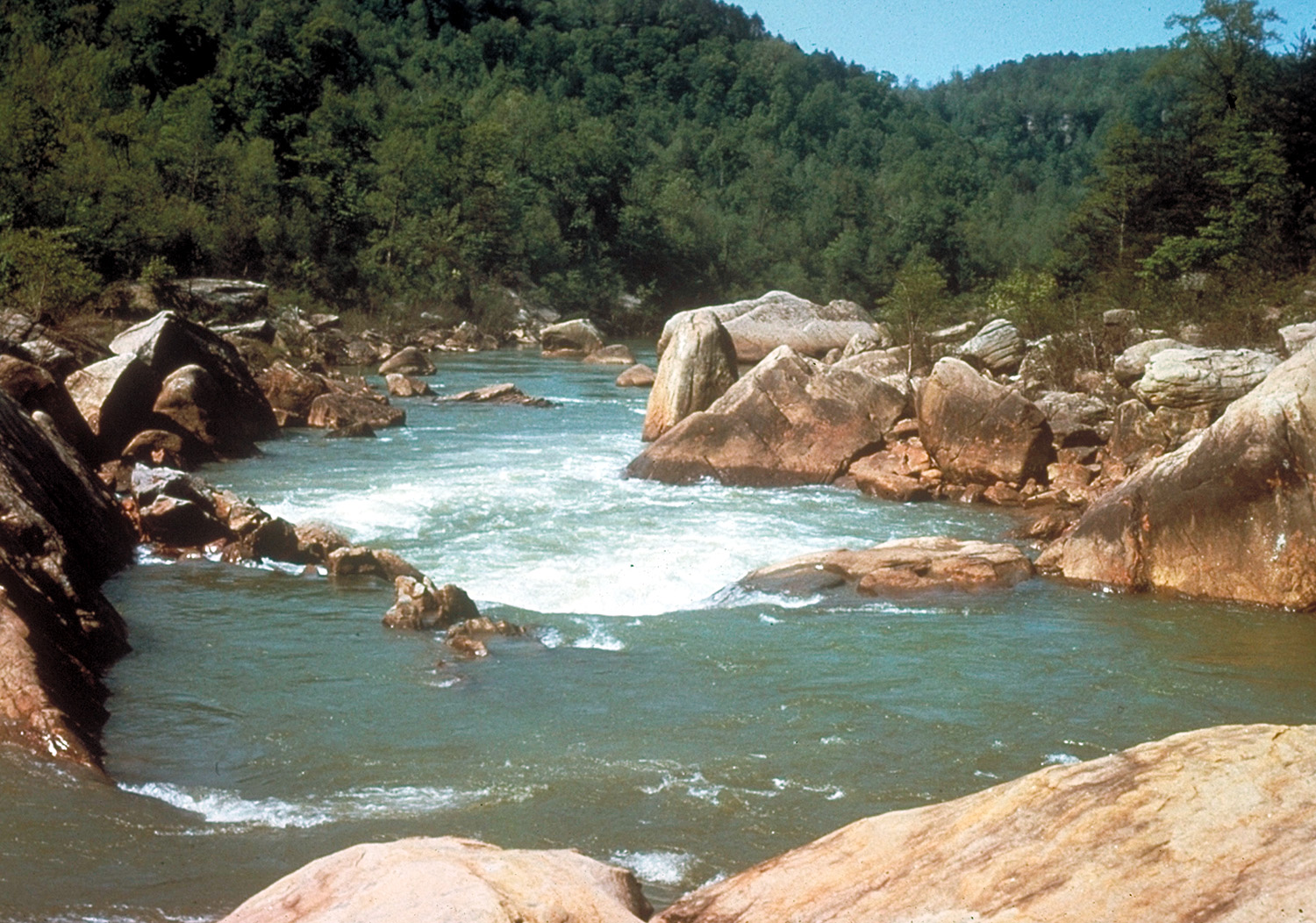
Big South Fork Cumberland River

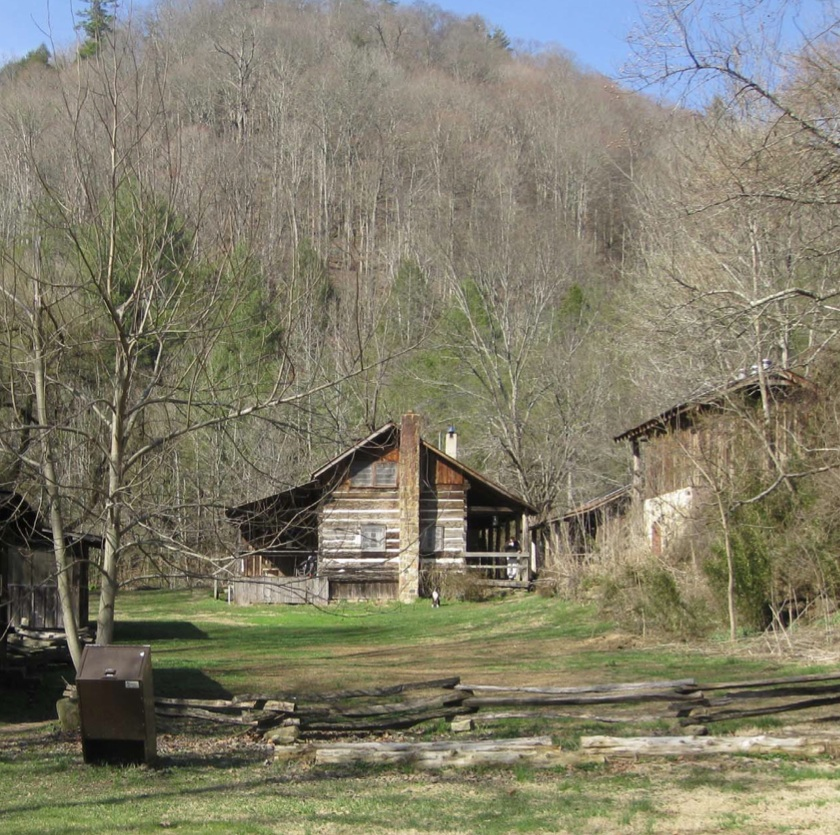
Charit Creek Lodge

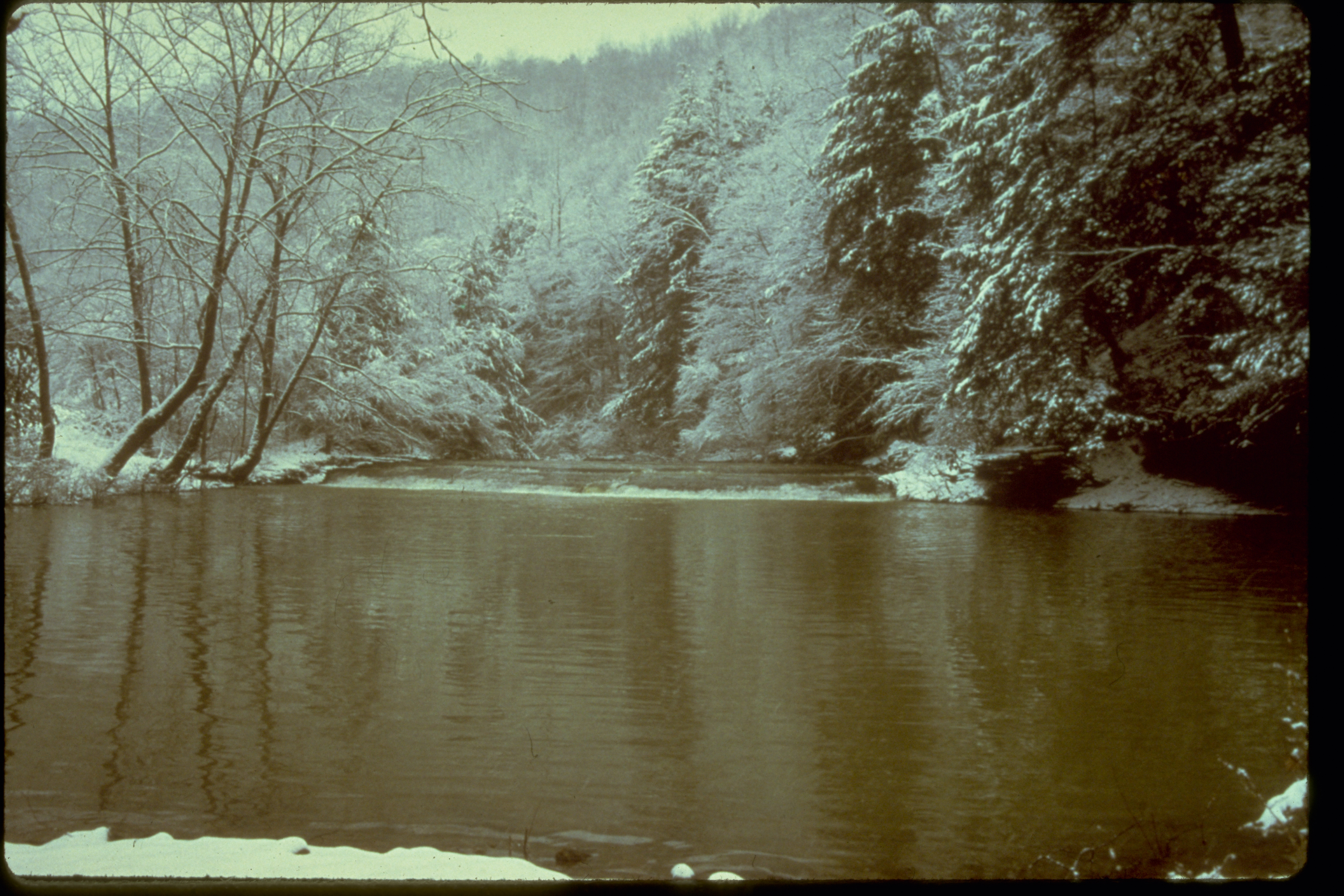
Big South Fork in winter

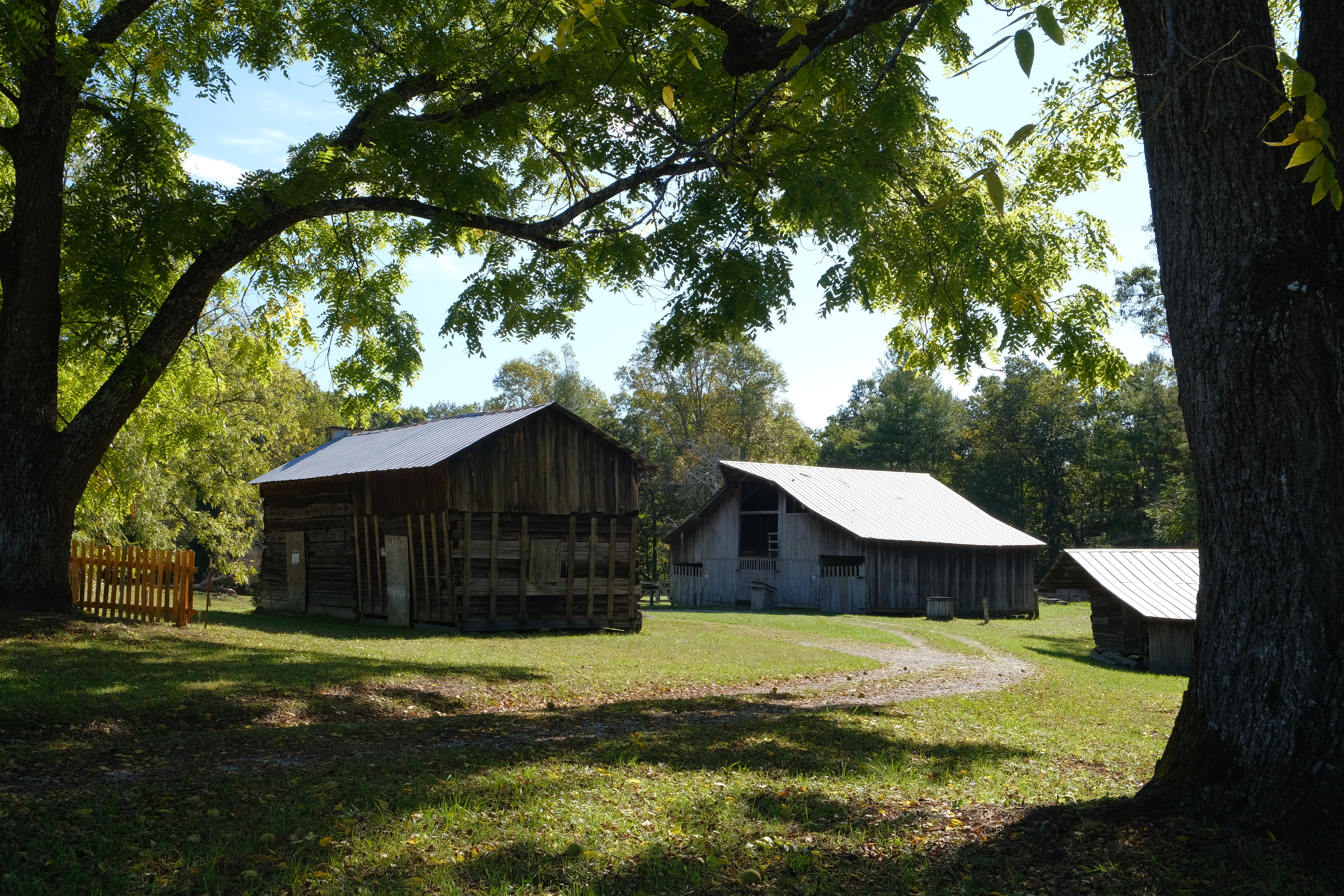
A view of buildings on Blevin's Farm in Big South Fork National Park
