= McCreary County Museum =

- U.S. Historic district – Contributing property
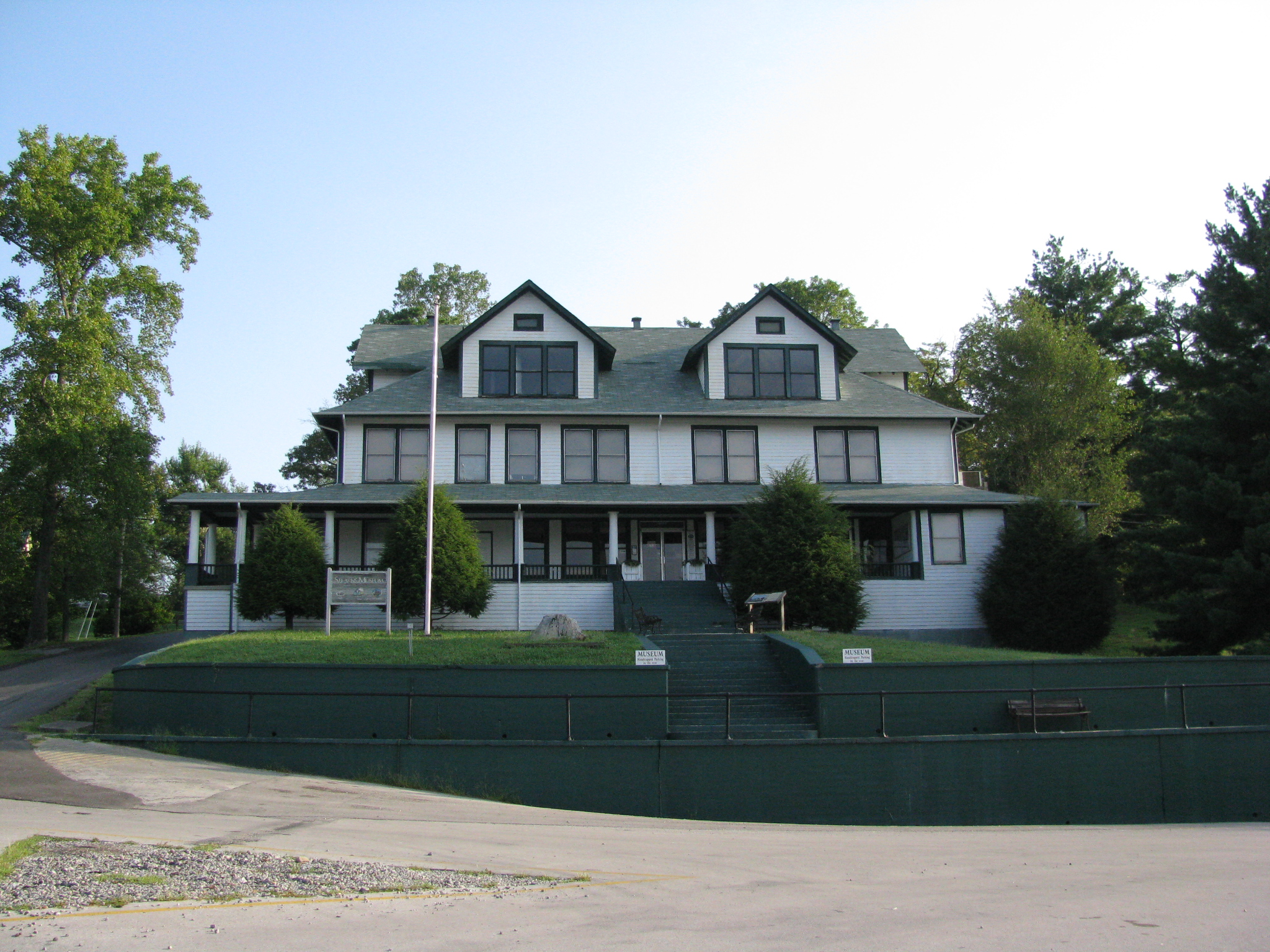
- The McCreary County Museum in the early 2000s

- Location within Kentucky Location within the United States
- Location: 1 Henderson Street, Stearns, Kentucky
- Coordinates: 36°41′57″N 84°28′37″W
- Built: 1903
- Website: McCreary County Museum
- Part of: Stearns Administrative and Commercial District (ID88002528)
- Added to NRHP: November 16, 1988

Constructed in 1907, the McCreary County Museum is housed in the former Stearns Coal and Lumber Company corporate headquarters in Stearns, Kentucky. The building served as the company's office headquarters in the Southern United States, and maintains the company president's office as an exhibit. The town where the museum is located was called the Stearns Empire of the South, and the museum continues to preserve and display the area's history from the Indian and pioneer times into the town's peak at the height of the coal and lumber industry boom. The exhibits include significant coverage of Appalachian life in McCreary County, including an exhibit on moonshine.

The museum uses the first floor of the 16,000 square foot building to display artifacts, including historic documents, objects, and photographs pertaining to McCreary County and the Stearns Coal & Lumber Company. A permanent exhibit honoring the life of Wilburn K. Ross displays the Medal of Honor winner's uniform and photographs. The second floor and third floors are closed to the public.

The museum is adjacent to the depot of the Big South Fork Scenic Railway, a heritage railroad, on tracks that were used by the Kentucky & Tennessee Railway, along the Southern Railway.

== See also ==
- Barthell, Kentucky: Stearns Coal and Lumber Company town in McCreary County, Kentucky
- Blue Heron, Kentucky: Stearns Coal and Lumber Company town in McCreary County, Kentucky
- Justus Smith Stearns: Founder of Stearns Coal and Lumber Company
- Stearns, Kentucky: Stearns Coal and Lumber Company town in McCreary County, Kentucky
