= Whitley City, Kentucky =

Census-designated place in Kentucky, United States

- Census-designated place
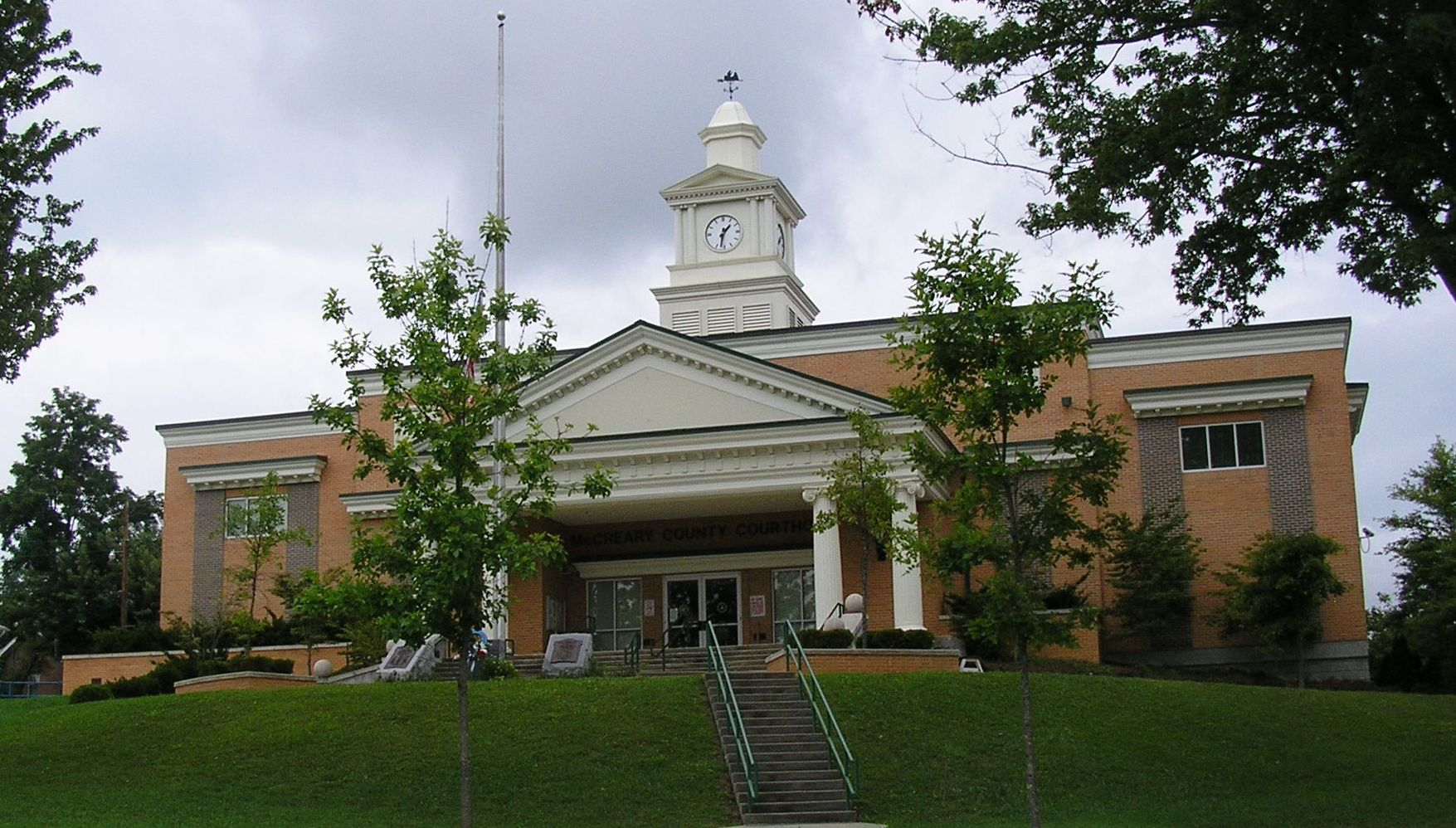
- McCreary County courthouse in Whitley City

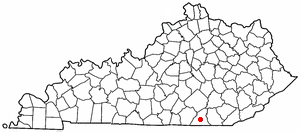
- Location in Kentucky
- Coordinates: 36°43′26″N 84°28′23″W
- Country: United States
- State: Kentucky
- County: McCreary

Area
  - Total: 2.32 sq mi (6.00 km^{2})
  - Land: 2.31 sq mi (5.97 km^{2})
  - Water: 0.012 sq mi (0.03 km^{2})
- Elevation: 1,299 ft (396 m)

Population (2020)
  - Total: 968
  - Density: 419.6/sq mi (162.02/km^{2})
- Time zone: UTC-5 (Eastern (EST))
  - Summer (DST): UTC-4 (EDT)
- ZIP code: 42653
- Area code: 606
- FIPS code: 21-82938
- GNIS feature ID: 2403026

Whitley City is an unincorporated community and census-designated place (CDP) in McCreary County, Kentucky, United States. The population was 968 at the 2020 census, down from 1,170 in 2010. It is the county seat of McCreary County. Whitley City is one of two unincorporated county seats in Kentucky (the other being Burlington in Boone County).

== Geography ==
Whitley City is located in central McCreary County. It is bordered to the south by the community of Stearns. U.S. Route 27 passes through the east side of Whitley City, leading north 30 miles (48 km) to Somerset and south 18 miles (29 km) to Oneida, Tennessee.

According to the United States Census Bureau, the Whitley City CDP has a total area of 2.32 square miles (6.0 km^{2}), of which 0.01 square miles (0.03 km^{2}), or 0.43%, are water. Yahoo Falls on the course of Yahoo Creek, a tributary of the South Fork of the Cumberland River, is located 4 miles (6 km) to the northwest.

== Demographics ==
Historical population
Census	Pop.	Note	%±
1960	1,034		—
1970	1,060		2.5%
1980	1,683		58.8%
1990	1,133		−32.7%
2000	1,111		−1.9%
2010	1,170		5.3%
2020	968		−17.3%
U.S. Decennial Census

As of the census of 2000, there were 1,111 people, 458 households, and 296 families residing in the CDP. The population density was 481.5 inhabitants per square mile (185.9/km^{2}). There were 516 housing units at an average density of 223.7 per square mile (86.4/km^{2}). The racial makeup of the CDP was 98.92% White, 0.72% Native American, 0.09% from other races, and 0.27% from two or more races. Hispanic or Latino of any race were 0.54% of the population.

There were 458 households, out of which 32.3% had children under the age of 18 living with them, 38.6% were married couples living together, 20.7% had a female householder with no husband present, and 35.2% were non-families. 31.9% of all households were made up of individuals, and 12.2% had someone living alone who was 65 years of age or older. The average household size was 2.31 and the average family size was 2.89.

In the CDP, the population was spread out, with 25.6% under the age of 18, 10.6% from 18 to 24, 28.1% from 25 to 44, 23.0% from 45 to 64, and 12.7% who were 65 years of age or older. The median age was 35 years. For every 100 females, there were 88.3 males. For every 100 females age 18 and over, there were 88.8 males.

The median income for a household in the CDP was $18,654, and the median income for a family was $18,702. Males had a median income of $29,306 versus $22,500 for females. The per capita income for the CDP was $11,659. About 28.9% of families and 38.8% of the population were below the poverty line, including 58.8% of those under age 18 and 12.4% of those age 65 or over.

== Education ==
There is one school district in the county, McCreary County School District. The district's comprehensive high school is McCreary Central High School.

Whitley City has a lending library, the McCreary County Public Library.

== Media ==
- WHAY Radio 98.3FM
- The McCreary County Voice
