= McCreary Central High School =

Coordinates: 36.7092°N 84.4650°W

Location
- 400 Raider Way; Stearns, McCreary County, Kentucky 42647; United States

Information
- Type: Public high school
- Established: 1978
- School district: McCreary County Schools
- Principal: Charlotte Barnett
- Teaching staff: 51.00 (FTE)
- Enrollment: 718 (2023-2024)
- Student to teacher ratio: 14.08
- Colors: Maroon and gold
- Nickname: Raiders

McCreary Central High School is a high school located in Stearns, Kentucky, United States. It is a part of McCreary County Schools.

The school district's boundary is that of McCreary County.

== History ==
The school was built in 1978 by combining McCreary County High and Pine Knot High Schools. The school recently underwent restructuring, which tiers class assignments of student around college readiness or EPAS benchmarks.

== Academics ==
McCreary Central High School was one of only two high schools in the area to reach its NCLB goals. Over the past three years, school-wide ACT scores have consistently improved. The school is considered to be an "On Site Center" for CTE courses and houses nine different CTE programs.

== Athletics ==
McCreary Central High School's colors are maroon and gold, derived from the maroon of McCreary County High and gold from Pine Knot. The Raiders are the official mascot of McCreary Central, representing teams in both boys' and girls' basketball, volleyball, softball, baseball, football, wrestling, golf, and girls soccer as well as cheerleading. The school also offers other clubs and programs centered on athletics.
