= McCreary County, Kentucky =

County in Kentucky, United States

- County
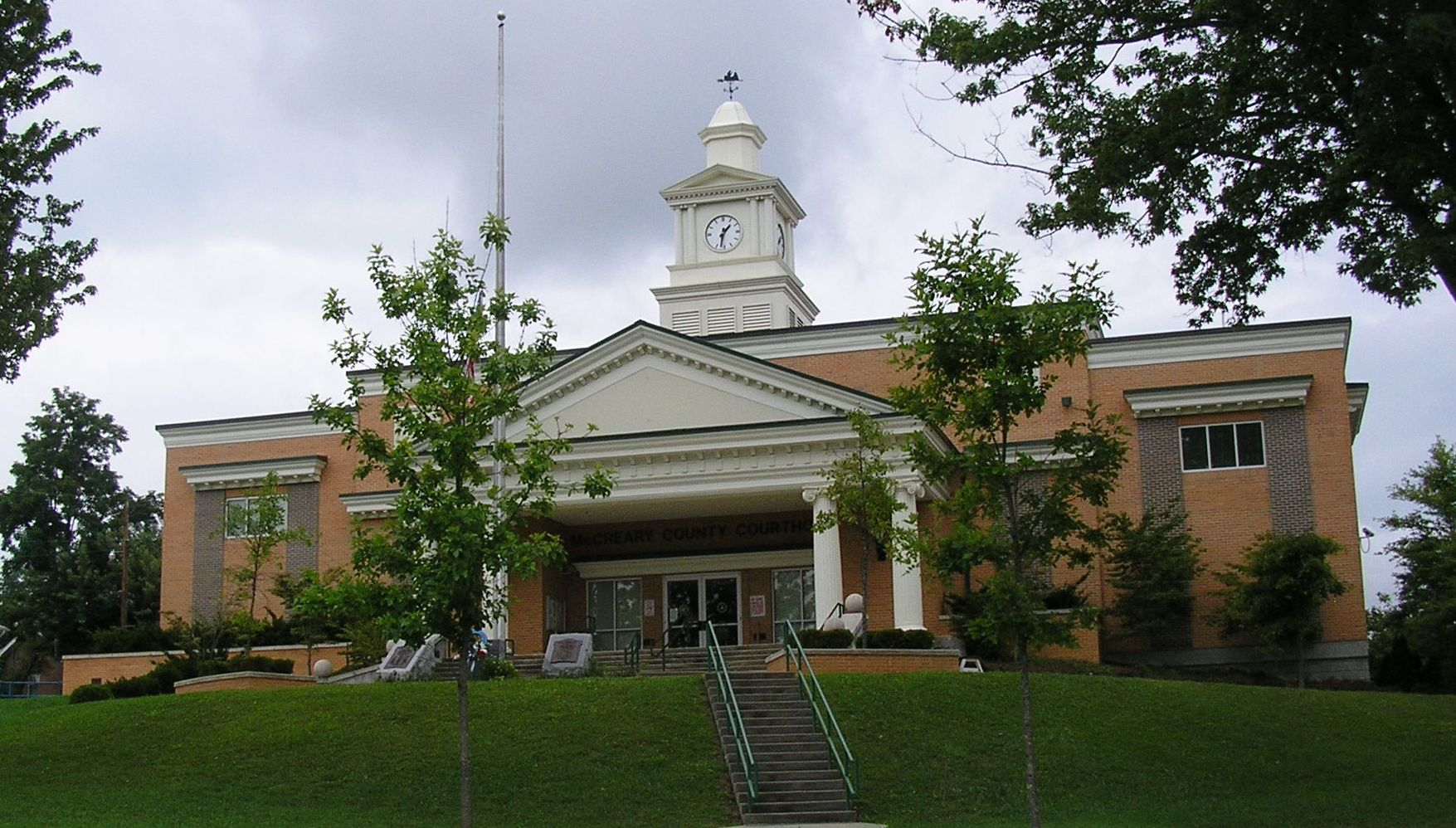
- McCreary County courthouse in Whitley City

- Location within the U.S. state of Kentucky
- Coordinates: 36°44′N 84°29′W
- Country: United States
- State: Kentucky
- Founded: March 12, 1912
- Named for: James B. McCreary
- Seat: Whitley City
- Largest community: Pine Knot

Government
  - Judge/Executive: Jimmie Greene II

Area
  - Total: 431 sq mi (1,120 km^{2})
  - Land: 427 sq mi (1,110 km^{2})
  - Water: 4.1 sq mi (11 km^{2}) 1.0%

Population (2020)
  - Total: 16,888
  - Estimate (2025): 17,124 ▲
  - Density: 39.6/sq mi (15.3/km^{2})
- Time zone: UTC−5 (Eastern)
  - Summer (DST): UTC−4 (EDT)
- Congressional district: 5th
- Website: www.mccrearycounty.com

McCreary County is a county located in the U.S. state of Kentucky. As of the 2020 census, the population was 16,888. Its county seat is Whitley City. The county is named for James B. McCreary, a Confederate war soldier and two-time Governor of Kentucky (1875–1879, 1911–1915). During his second term as governor, McCreary County was created by the Legislature and was named in his honor.

== History ==
McCreary County is the only Kentucky county without an incorporated city. Because of this, county government is the sole local government agency for the entire county. Attractions in McCreary County include the Big South Fork National River and Recreation Area, Cumberland Falls State Park, and the Big South Fork Scenic Railway, which tours several former coal camps. In popular culture, McCreary County is mentioned in the FX drama Justified, for it is home to USP McCreary, near Pine Knot.

The majority of the county is controlled by the federal government. 43% is managed by the Daniel Boone National Forest, and 18% managed by the National Park Service as the Big South Fork National River and Recreation Area.

The area now encompassed by Kentucky's McCreary County was first bounded in 1772, when all of what is now the state of Kentucky was in the frontier county of Fincastle County, Virginia. Fincastle was divided in 1776, with the western portion named Kentucky County, Virginia. In 1780, the Virginia legislature set aside all land in Kentucky County for soldiers who had served in the Revolutionary War. In 1780, Kentucky County was divided into three counties: Jefferson, Fayette, and Lincoln. In 1784, a portion of Jefferson County was partitioned off to create Nelson County, and in 1792 a portion of Lincoln County was partitioned off to create Green County. In 1798, a further portion of Lincoln County was partitioned off, and combined with parts of Green County, to create Pulaski and Cumberland Counties. The following year yet another portion of Lincoln County was partitioned off to create Knox County, and in 1800 the new Cumberland County was sectioned off to create Wayne County. In 1818, Whitley County was created from a portion of Knox County.

In 1912, the Kentucky Legislature partitioned parts of Pulaski, Wayne, and Whitley Counties, to create McCreary County. Its boundaries have remained unchanged since that time. It is the 120th and final county in order of formation. The present county boundaries contain 427.7 square miles (1,107.7 km^{2}) of land area. The majority of the county was carved out of Wayne and Whitley Counties, with a large center strip following the rail line and roadway from Pulaski County. The early history of the area is that of those counties, and is related in the historic perspectives for them. The map to the left shows the network of roadways that had been established by the 1860s. A dotted blue line and settlement names have been added for reference.

Historic Map of McCreary County Area

The most significant early feature of the future county was the Jacksboro Road. Running from Jacksboro, Tennessee, to Point Isabel and Somerset, this pioneer road was simply an enlargement of the Tellico Trail, an Indian route that had been used for thousands of years. Several other trails intersected this road, and led to the settlement of villages such as Pine Knot, Dripping Springs/Coolidge, and Flat Rock. Other settlement occurred in sequestered hollows. The economy of the times was based upon small-scale subsistence agriculture, timber products such as railroad ties and barrel staves, and small coal mines.

Beginning in the early 19th century, Cumberland Falls gained attention as a tourism destination. Later development increased visitation, and the Brunsen Inn was a popular destination for seasonal visitors. Until a road was built from Whitley County in 1931, the primary access to the Falls was through McCreary. With a generous contribution from one of the DuPont family heirs, the Falls joined the state park system in 1930.

The completion of the Cincinnati Southern Railway line through the county in 1880 changed its economic characteristics. Access to distant markets for timber and coal caused the emergence of many small mining and logging companies. The greatest impact came from the Justus S. Stearns enterprises. From 1903 through the rest of the century, the territory of McCreary County was dominated and controlled by Stearns company interests.

Attempting to avoid financial losses during the Great Depression of the 1930s, the Stearns cluster of companies sold vast quantities of land to the U.S. Government, becoming part of what was to become the Cumberland National Forest in 1937. This forest reserve was subsequently renamed Daniel Boone National Forest. In the 1970s, legislative action acquired additional lands in southern McCreary and Tennessee, creating the Big South Fork National River and Recreation Area in the mid-1970s.

== Geography ==
According to the United States Census Bureau, the county has a total area of 431 square miles (1,120 km^{2}), of which 427 square miles (1,110 km^{2}) is land and 4.1 square miles (11 km^{2}) (1.0%) is water.

=== Geology ===
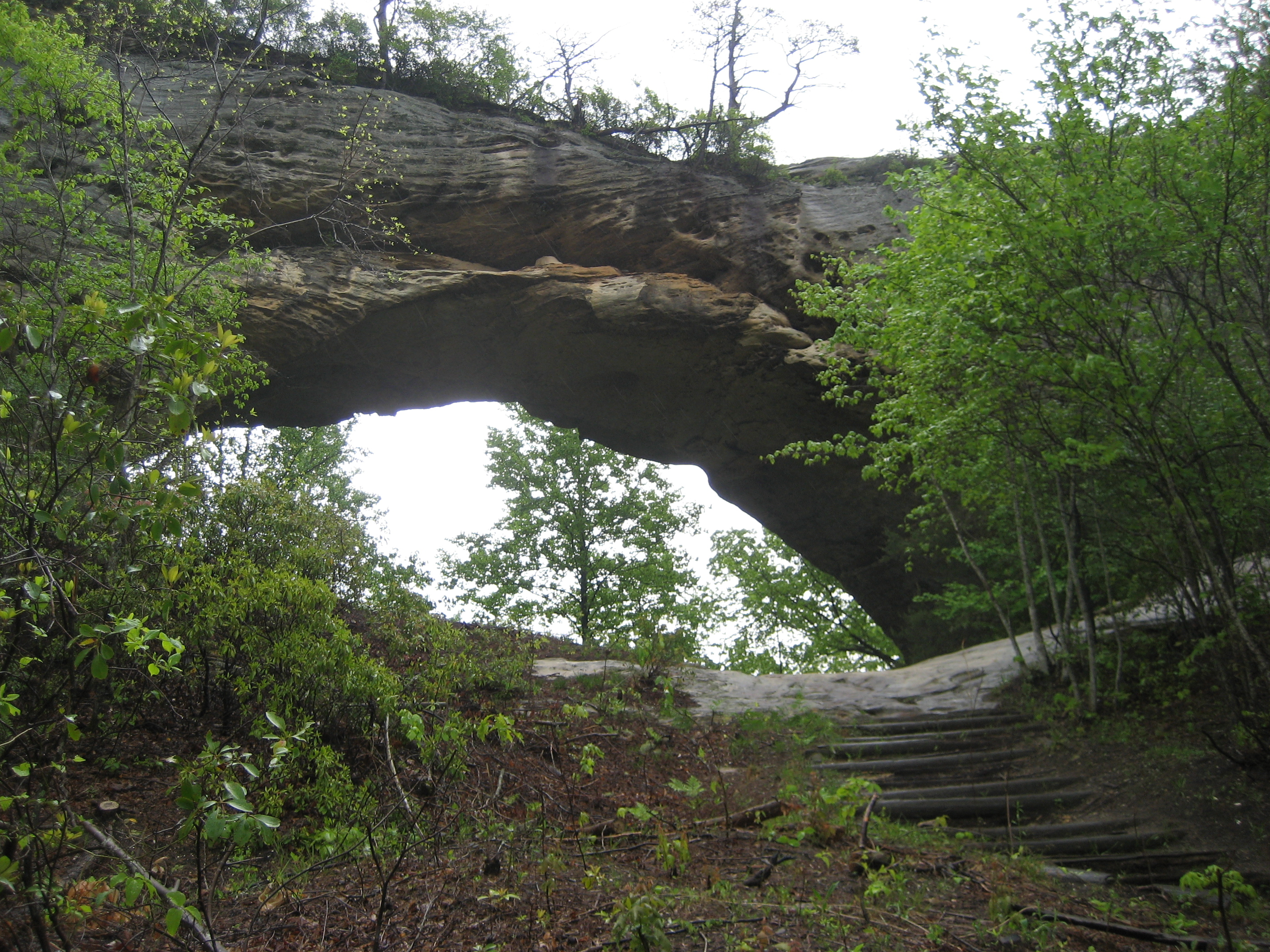
Natural Arch, a prominent feature of Daniel Boone National Forest, is located in McCreary County.

McCreary County lies on the western edge of the Cumberland Plateau, which constitutes the East Kentucky Coal Field. It is located entirely within the proclamation boundary of the Daniel Boone National Forest. The county's bedrock is deeply incised by the Big South Fork of the Cumberland River and its tributaries, creating sheer cliffs, gorges, waterfalls, rock shelters, and natural stone arches. Most of the geological underpinning of this region is capped with thick sandstone, and formidable coal seams are common in this formation. Limited lands suitable for large-scale conventional agriculture exist, so the economy of the area has historically been centered upon extractive industries such as timber and mining.

=== Adjacent counties ===
- Pulaski County (north)
- Laurel County (northeast)
- Whitley County (east)
- Campbell County, Tennessee (southeast)
- Scott County, Tennessee (south)
- Wayne County (west)

=== National protected areas ===
- Big South Fork National River and Recreation Area (part)
- Daniel Boone National Forest (part)

== Demographics ==
Historical population
Census	Pop.	Note	%±
1920	11,676		—
1930	14,627		25.3%
1940	16,451		12.5%
1950	16,660		1.3%
1960	12,463		−25.2%
1970	12,548		0.7%
1980	15,634		24.6%
1990	15,603		−0.2%
2000	17,080		9.5%
2010	18,306		7.2%
2020	16,888		−7.7%
2025 (est.)	17,124	▲	1.4%
U.S. Decennial Census; 1790–1960 1900–1990; 1990–2000 2010–2020

=== 2020 census ===
As of the 2020 census, the county had a population of 16,888. The median age was 40.2 years. 22.9% of residents were under the age of 18 and 16.6% of residents were 65 years of age or older. For every 100 females there were 116.7 males, and for every 100 females age 18 and over there were 120.5 males age 18 and over.

The racial makeup of the county was 90.7% White, 5.4% Black or African American, 0.4% American Indian and Alaska Native, 0.2% Asian, 0.0% Native Hawaiian and Pacific Islander, 0.4% from some other race, and 2.9% from two or more races. Hispanic or Latino residents of any race comprised 2.2% of the population.

0.0% of residents lived in urban areas, while 100.0% lived in rural areas.

There were 6,058 households in the county, of which 31.2% had children under the age of 18 living with them and 28.5% had a female householder with no spouse or partner present. About 30.2% of all households were made up of individuals and 13.5% had someone living alone who was 65 years of age or older.

There were 6,892 housing units, of which 12.1% were vacant. Among occupied housing units, 71.8% were owner-occupied and 28.2% were renter-occupied. The homeowner vacancy rate was 1.3% and the rental vacancy rate was 4.7%.

=== 2000 census ===
As of the census of 2000, there were 17,080 people, 6,520 households, and 4,753 families residing in the county. The population density was 40 per square mile (15/km^{2}). There were 7,405 housing units at an average density of 17 per square mile (6.6/km^{2}). The racial makeup of the county was 97.99% White, 0.63% Black or African American, 0.42% Native American, 0.02% Asian, 0.01% Pacific Islander, 0.20% from other races, and 0.73% from two or more races. 0.62% of the population were Hispanics or Latinos of any race.

There were 6,520 households, out of which 35.70% had children under the age of 18 living with them, 54.50% were married couples living together, 13.80% had a female householder with no husband present, and 27.10% were non-families. 24.70% of all households were made up of individuals, and 8.40% had someone living alone who was 65 years of age or older. The average household size was 2.55 and the average family size was 3.03.

The age distribution was 27.70% under the age of 18, 9.80% from 18 to 24, 28.20% from 25 to 44, 23.70% from 45 to 64, and 10.60% who were 65 years of age or older. The median age was 34 years. For every 100 females there were 96.90 males. For every 100 females age 18 and over, there were 93.80 males.

The median income for a household in the county was $19,348, and the median income for a family was $22,261. Males had a median income of $20,823 versus $15,575 for females. The per capita income for the county was $9,896. About 26.10% of families and 32.20% of the population were below the poverty line, including 40.50% of those under age 18 and 27.30% of those age 65 or over. The county's per-capita income makes it one of the poorest counties in the United States, and second in poverty only to another county in the same Kentucky region, Clay County, among counties with a majority non-Hispanic white population.

== Politics ==
United States presidential election results for McCreary County, Kentucky
Year	Republican		Democratic		Third party(ies)	
Year	No.	%	No.	%	No.	%
1912	411	33.36%	225	18.26%	596	48.38%
1916	1,630	82.28%	324	16.36%	27	1.36%
1920	2,889	84.01%	525	15.27%	25	0.73%
1924	2,317	74.98%	533	17.25%	240	7.77%
1928	3,622	89.10%	435	10.70%	8	0.20%
1932	3,360	73.43%	1,194	26.09%	22	0.48%
1936	2,953	72.57%	1,105	27.16%	11	0.27%
1940	3,172	71.62%	1,248	28.18%	9	0.20%
1944	3,419	79.49%	880	20.46%	2	0.05%
1948	3,031	75.93%	933	23.37%	28	0.70%
1952	3,360	77.98%	937	21.75%	12	0.28%
1956	3,812	82.33%	814	17.58%	4	0.09%
1960	3,671	79.89%	924	20.11%	0	0.00%
1964	2,230	60.55%	1,428	38.77%	25	0.68%
1968	2,670	67.61%	759	19.22%	520	13.17%
1972	3,203	80.56%	684	17.20%	89	2.24%
1976	3,272	63.63%	1,827	35.53%	43	0.84%
1980	3,786	71.27%	1,377	25.92%	149	2.80%
1984	4,028	70.58%	1,609	28.19%	70	1.23%
1988	3,477	66.96%	1,644	31.66%	72	1.39%
1992	3,588	57.78%	1,934	31.14%	688	11.08%
1996	2,527	52.70%	1,710	35.66%	558	11.64%
2000	3,321	69.20%	1,418	29.55%	60	1.25%
2004	4,121	72.39%	1,530	26.88%	42	0.74%
2008	4,078	75.42%	1,258	23.27%	71	1.31%
2012	4,564	79.97%	1,069	18.73%	74	1.30%
2016	5,012	86.77%	664	11.50%	100	1.73%
2020	5,664	87.98%	725	11.26%	49	0.76%
2024	5,531	89.04%	641	10.32%	40	0.64%

McCreary County has only once voted for a non-Republican for president, in the year of its formation, when it voted for Theodore Roosevelt of the Progressive Party, with President William Howard Taft second and Democrat Woodrow Wilson a distant third at 18.1%. This trend has only strengthened in recent elections, with Republican Donald Trump winning 89.05% of the vote in 2024, the highest vote share for a Republican in the county since Herbert Hoover in 1928.

The Federal Bureau of Prisons U.S. Penitentiary, McCreary is in the county, near Pine Knot.

=== Elected officials ===
==== State and Federal ====
Elected officials as of January 3, 2025
U.S. House	Hal Rogers (R)	KY 5
Ky. Senate	Robert Stivers (R)	25
Ky. House	Ken Upchurch (R)	52

==== County ====
Elected officials as of November 2023
Judge/Executive	Jimmie Bevo Greene (R)
Magistrate District 1	William Bill Hale (R)
Magistrate District 2	William Taylor (R) (Note: Elected in a November 2023 special election.)
Magistrate District 3	Bobby Strunk (R)
Magistrate District 4	Randy Wayne Maxwell (R)
Clerk	Eric Haynes (R)
Attorney	Austin Price (R)
Jailer	Jessie Hatfield (R)
Coroner	Tim Corder (R)
Surveyor	Jim Watters (R)
Property Value Admin.	Dwight Ross (R)
Sheriff	David Sampson (R)

==== Judicial ====
Elected officials as of January 6, 2025
Commonwealth's Attorney	Ronnie Bowling (R)
Circuit Court Clerk	Othel Wayne King (R)
34th Circuit, 1st division	Dan Ballou
34th Circuit, 2nd division	Paul K. Winchester
34th District, 1st division	Cathy E. Prewitt
34th District, 2nd division	Fred F. White

== Economy ==
The economic history of McCreary County has been one of boom and bust, based upon the extractive resources of coal mining and timber. The Stearns interests sold the last of their mining operations to Blue Diamond Coal in the 1980s, and the county's last operating mine closed in 1994. A resurgence of the coal industry does not seem possible, as the local coal is high in sulfur, and drainage from coal mining would adversely affect a number of outstanding and special waters in the county.

The county is poor. McCreary is one of the U.S. counties most dependent upon federal government assistance programs such as SNAP, SSI, SSDI, Social Security, Medicare/Medicaid, and other government assistance programs. 52.46 percent of the income of the residents of the county is derived from government assistance. The average resident received $11,022 in government assistance in 2009.

Industrial development began in the 1970s, with new manufacturing concerns in the sewing industry. Changes in the global economy have shifted a substantial percentage of the consumer garment market to production facilities outside the United States. Those that remain in the county draw their work from military contracts, and the production of high-end consumer goods. Timber remains a factor in the economy, with logging and cut hardwood production. Since the 1970s, the county has attempted to develop three industrial parks with little success. The latest venture, on Kentucky Route 92 in Pine Knot, is building a "spec" building as a means of attracting new industry to the county.

Agriculture has never played a significant role in the county's economy. In 2002, 5% of the county was in farmland. Top products were livestock, hay and forage. Together this represented a total market value of $566,000, down 1% from 1997. These low numbers indicate that the county has never had a substantial agricultural industry, and that over 80% of the county lands are held by the federal government. McCreary County is ranked number 112 out of 120 counties in overall agricultural production.

The tourism industry in the county may trace its beginnings to the restoration of Historic Stearns, the development of the scenic railway, the interpretive work at Blue Heron, and the reconstruction of Barthell, the site of Stearns Company's first coal mine and town in 1903. Those resources may represent the largest interpretive collection of historic coal mining in America. The Big South Fork Scenic Railway is presently in a major development project to add a steam locomotive and to extend the line.

The Big South Fork NRRA represents 196 square miles (508 km^{2}) of land, of which approximately one-third is located in McCreary County. The largest section of the park and its main Bandy Creek visitor center are located in Tennessee. In 2004, the park received 901,425 visitors, down 23% from 2002. Due to a lack of organized activities, events, and recreational tourism opportunities, visitation on the Kentucky side does not fare well. Similar issues exist for visitation in the Stearns district of the Daniel Boone National Forest.

=== Transportation ===
McCreary County Airport is near Pine Knot.

US 27 splits the county north and south, and KY 92 runs east and west. US 27 and KY 92 run concurrent from Pine Knot to the traffic light at Stearns, where KY 92 splits off and heads west towards Wayne County. McCreary is also served by Norfolk Southern Railway, which has several industrial sidings in the area. NS also interchanges traffic with the Kentucky and Tennessee Railway in Stearns.

== Communities ==
McCreary is the last remaining county in the Commonwealth of Kentucky that does not have any incorporated city or township. The following McCreary County communities are census-designated places:

- Pine Knot
- Stearns
- Whitley City (county seat)

== Education ==
There is one school district in the county, McCreary County School District. The district's comprehensive high school is McCreary Central High School.

== Attractions ==
- Barthell Coal Mining Camp
- Big South Fork National River and Recreation Area
- Big South Fork Scenic Railway
- Blue Heron Coal Mining Camp
- Cumberland Falls State Resort Park
- Eagle Falls
- McCreary County Museum
- Natural Arch of Kentucky
- Yahoo Falls
- Yahoo Arch

== Notable people ==
- Wilburn K. Ross
- Allie Leggett
- Will Lavender

== See also ==
- McCreary County v. American Civil Liberties Union
- National Register of Historic Places listings in McCreary County, Kentucky
