= Stearns, Kentucky =

Census-designated place in Kentucky, United States

- Census-designated place
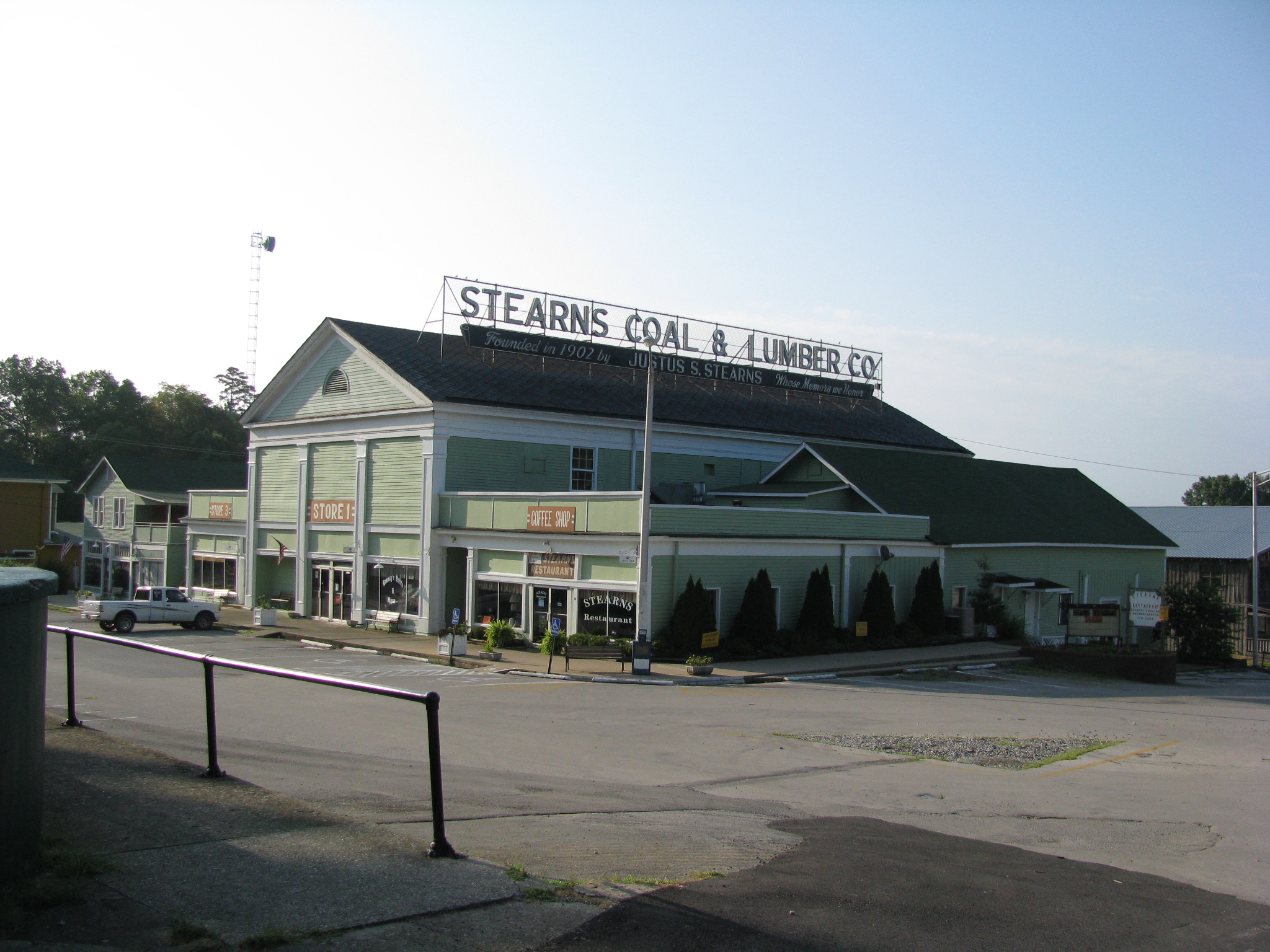
- Stearns in 2010

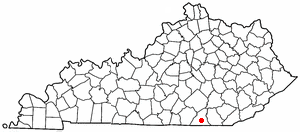
- Location in Kentucky
- Coordinates: 36°41′45″N 84°28′37″W
- Country: United States
- State: Kentucky
- County: McCreary

Area
  - Total: 4.05 sq mi (10.50 km^{2})
  - Land: 4.02 sq mi (10.41 km^{2})
  - Water: 0.035 sq mi (0.09 km^{2})
- Elevation: 1,319 ft (402 m)

Population (2020)
  - Total: 1,365
  - Density: 339.6/sq mi (131.11/km^{2})
- Time zone: UTC-5 (Eastern (EST))
  - Summer (DST): UTC-4 (EDT)
- ZIP code: 42647
- Area code: 606
- FIPS code: 21-73362
- GNIS feature ID: 2402896

Stearns is an unincorporated community and census-designated place (CDP) in McCreary County, Kentucky, United States. The population was 1,365 at the 2020 census. It was founded by Justus Smith Stearns.

== Geography ==
Stearns is located in south-central McCreary County. It is bordered to the north by Whitley City, the county seat, and to the south by Pine Knot. The unincorporated community of Revelo is partly within the Stearns CDP, along its southern border.

U.S. Route 27 runs along the eastern edge of Stearns, leading north through Whitley City 31 miles (50 km) to Somerset and south 16 miles (26 km) to Oneida, Tennessee. Kentucky Route 92 passes through the center of Stearns and leads west 29 miles (47 km) to Monticello. Eastbound KY 92 joins US 27 south to Pine Knot, then turns east to lead to Williamsburg.

According to the United States Census Bureau, the Stearns CDP has a total area of 4.05 square miles (10.5 km^{2}), of which 0.03 square miles (0.08 km^{2}), or 0.84%, are water. The community is drained to the west by tributaries of Roaring Paunch Creek, which continues west to the South Fork of the Cumberland River, while the east side of the community is drained by tributaries of Marsh Creek, which flows north to the main stem of the Cumberland River.

== Climate ==
The climate in this area is characterized by hot, humid summers and generally mild to cool winters. According to the Köppen climate classification system, Stearns has a humid subtropical climate, abbreviated "Cfa" on climate maps. The hottest temperature recorded in Stearns was 108 °F (42.2 °C) on July 12, 1936, while the coldest temperature recorded was −24 °F (−31.1 °C) on January 21, 1985.

Climate data for Stearns, Kentucky, 1991–2020 normals, extremes 1936–present
| Month | Jan | Feb | Mar | Apr | May | Jun | Jul | Aug | Sep | Oct | Nov | Dec | Year |
|---|---|---|---|---|---|---|---|---|---|---|---|---|---|
| Record high °F (°C) | 76 (24) | 79 (26) | 85 (29) | 93 (34) | 96 (36) | 101 (38) | 108 (42) | 101 (38) | 98 (37) | 95 (35) | 82 (28) | 77 (25) | 108 (42) |
| Mean maximum °F (°C) | 64.0 (17.8) | 67.1 (19.5) | 74.0 (23.3) | 81.0 (27.2) | 86.2 (30.1) | 89.3 (31.8) | 92.5 (33.6) | 90.8 (32.7) | 88.0 (31.1) | 81.6 (27.6) | 72.0 (22.2) | 63.5 (17.5) | 93.3 (34.1) |
| Mean daily maximum °F (°C) | 45.0 (7.2) | 48.5 (9.2) | 58.8 (14.9) | 68.9 (20.5) | 76.5 (24.7) | 81.8 (27.7) | 85.4 (29.7) | 84.6 (29.2) | 79.5 (26.4) | 69.3 (20.7) | 57.5 (14.2) | 47.8 (8.8) | 67.0 (19.4) |
| Daily mean °F (°C) | 34.5 (1.4) | 37.1 (2.8) | 45.7 (7.6) | 54.7 (12.6) | 63.6 (17.6) | 70.5 (21.4) | 74.4 (23.6) | 73.1 (22.8) | 67.0 (19.4) | 55.4 (13.0) | 44.8 (7.1) | 37.6 (3.1) | 54.9 (12.7) |
| Mean daily minimum °F (°C) | 23.9 (−4.5) | 25.6 (−3.6) | 32.6 (0.3) | 40.6 (4.8) | 50.6 (10.3) | 59.3 (15.2) | 63.3 (17.4) | 61.6 (16.4) | 54.4 (12.4) | 41.5 (5.3) | 32.1 (0.1) | 27.4 (−2.6) | 42.7 (6.0) |
| Mean minimum °F (°C) | 7.5 (−13.6) | 11.2 (−11.6) | 18.4 (−7.6) | 28.5 (−1.9) | 37.5 (3.1) | 48.4 (9.1) | 54.4 (12.4) | 53.9 (12.2) | 42.8 (6.0) | 28.8 (−1.8) | 21.6 (−5.8) | 13.5 (−10.3) | 3.2 (−16.0) |
| Record low °F (°C) | −24 (−31) | −17 (−27) | −3 (−19) | 15 (−9) | 27 (−3) | 36 (2) | 40 (4) | 40 (4) | 29 (−2) | 17 (−8) | 9 (−13) | −18 (−28) | −24 (−31) |
| Average precipitation inches (mm) | 4.78 (121) | 4.46 (113) | 5.17 (131) | 4.69 (119) | 5.51 (140) | 5.25 (133) | 6.12 (155) | 3.67 (93) | 3.65 (93) | 3.27 (83) | 3.76 (96) | 5.75 (146) | 56.08 (1,423) |
| Average snowfall inches (cm) | 3.4 (8.6) | 2.7 (6.9) | 0.7 (1.8) | 0.3 (0.76) | 0.0 (0.0) | 0.0 (0.0) | 0.0 (0.0) | 0.0 (0.0) | 0.0 (0.0) | 0.0 (0.0) | 0.1 (0.25) | 2.0 (5.1) | 9.2 (23.41) |
| Average precipitation days (≥ 0.01 in) | 11.0 | 11.0 | 10.5 | 10.3 | 11.0 | 9.4 | 11.1 | 7.8 | 7.8 | 7.6 | 8.0 | 10.6 | 116.1 |
| Average snowy days (≥ 0.1 in) | 1.7 | 1.4 | 0.4 | 0.2 | 0.0 | 0.0 | 0.0 | 0.0 | 0.0 | 0.0 | 0.1 | 0.7 | 4.5 |
Source 1: NOAA (snow/snow days 1981–2010)
Source 2: National Weather Service

== Demographics ==
Historical population
| Census | Pop. | Note | %± |
|---|---|---|---|
| 1980 | 1,557 | | — |
| 1990 | 1,550 | | −0.4% |
| 2000 | 1,586 | | 2.3% |
| 2010 | 1,416 | | −10.7% |
| 2020 | 1,365 | | −3.6% |
U.S. Decennial Census

At the 2000 census, there were 1,586 people, 641 households and 464 families residing in the CDP. The population density was 396.7 inhabitants per square mile (153.2/km^{2}). There were 707 housing units at an average density of 176.8 per square mile (68.3/km^{2}). The racial makeup of the CDP was 98.36% White, 0.95% Native American, 0.06% from other races, and 0.63% from two or more races. Hispanic or Latino of any race were 0.38% of the population.

There were 641 households, of which 30.7% had children under the age of 18 living with them, 51.0% were married couples living together, 14.7% had a female householder with no husband present, and 27.6% were non-families. 26.2% of all households were made up of individuals, and 11.5% had someone living alone who was 65 years of age or older. The average household size was 2.46 and the average family size was 2.92.

Age distribution was 24.0% under the age of 18, 8.6% from 18 to 24, 28.0% from 25 to 44, 27.3% from 45 to 64, and 12.1% who were 65 years of age or older. The median age was 38 years. For every 100 females, there were 89.0 males. For every 100 females age 18 and over, there were 85.4 males.

The median household income was $20,833, and the median family income was $26,667. Males had a median income of $21,546 versus $18,750 for females. The per capita income for the CDP was $11,037. About 14.1% of families and 22.3% of the population were below the poverty line, including 24.9% of those under age 18 and 30.5% of those age 65 or over.

== Education ==
There is one school district in the county, McCreary County School District.

Stearns is home to McCreary Central High School and McCreary Middle School.

== See also ==
- Barthell, Kentucky: Stearns Coal and Lumber Company town in McCreary County, Kentucky
- Blue Heron, Kentucky: Stearns Coal and Lumber Company town in McCreary County, Kentucky
- McCreary County Museum: former headquarters of Stearns Coal and Lumber Company
