= Tombstone Junction =

Former theme park in Kentucky, US

Coordinates: 36.83478°N 84.35799°W

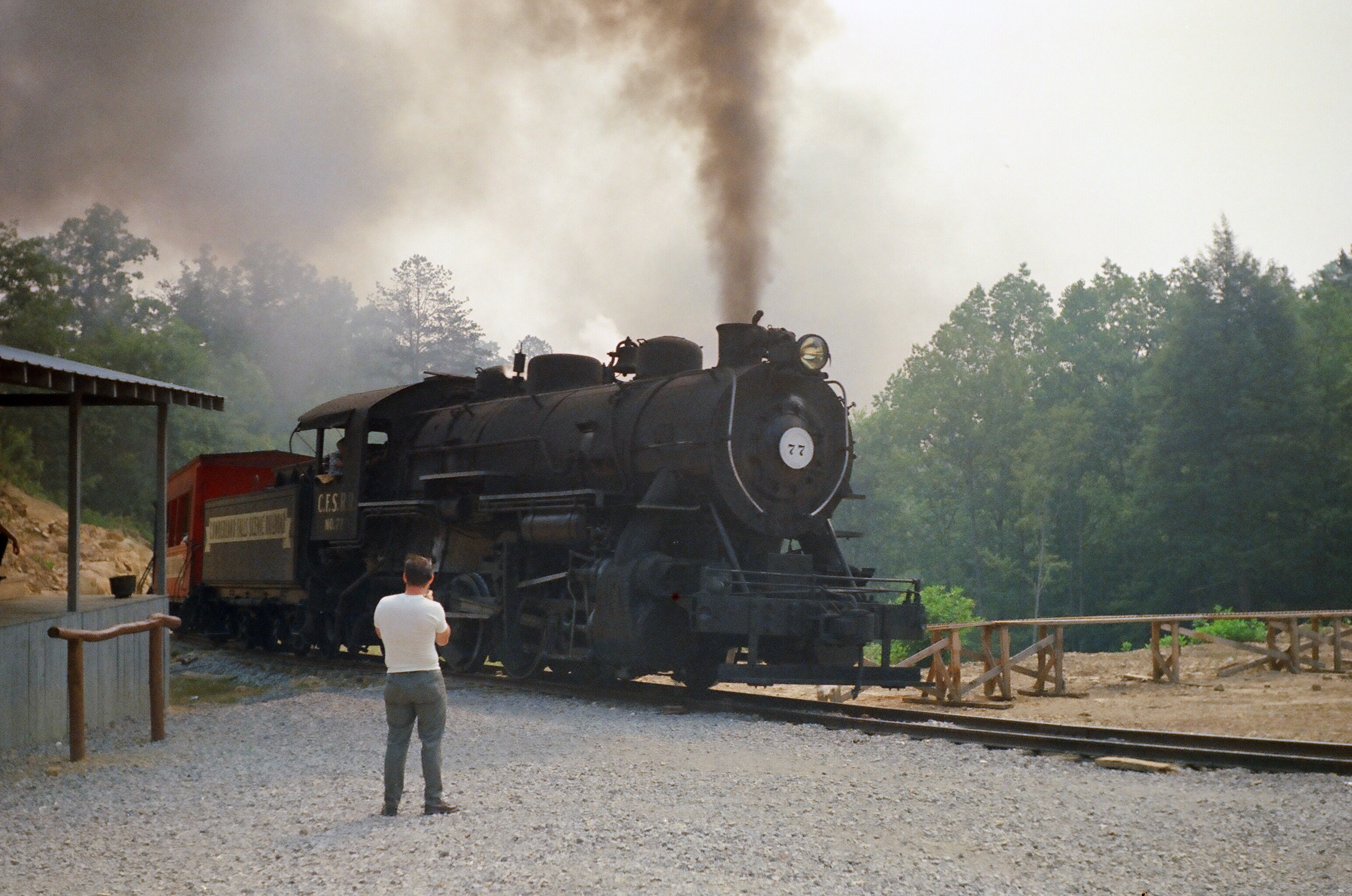
Cumberland Falls Scenic Railroad, #77

Tombstone Junction was a small, Western-town-themed park located on Kentucky Route 90 in McCreary County, Kentucky near the Cumberland Falls State Resort Park. It began operating in the 1960s and continued uninterrupted until it was heavily damaged by fire in 1989. The park continued with limited operation until it was completely destroyed by a second fire in 1991. The venue featured a recreation of a small, Western frontier town complete with train station, working saloon, dance hall, jailhouse, shanties, and shops. There was also an outdoor amphitheater that hosted live shows featuring country and western music of the period.

The leading attraction at Tombstone Junction was a 2 1/2-mile ride aboard a full-sized standard-gauge operating steam train.

== Background ==
The park developed from the building and operation of a tourist railroad attraction called the "Cumberland Falls Scenic Railroad" in the 1960s. The railroad was built by Millard and Morris Stephens from nearby Whitley City as an attraction to complement The Falls Motel (also owned by the Stephens) which was near Cumberland Falls State Resort Park, both of which were a very short distance from the park itself.

The railroad was built and laid around the edges of a large cut between two mountains that had been filled in enough so that a 2 1/2 mile L-shaped circle of track could be laid. The building of the Cumberland Falls Scenic Railroad followed a small trend of insular purpose built scenic railroads which were built during the 1960s that developed into full-fledged parks. More famous examples include the "Rebel Railroad" in Pigeon Forge, Tennessee which eventually grew into what is known as the Dollywood theme park today and the Tweetsie Railroad in Blowing Rock, North Carolina, which is still in operation under that name to this day. The specific difference being that these two operations were built to accommodate smaller 36" narrow gauge equipment (as seen in many parks today) while the Cumberland Falls Scenic was a full sized standard gauge railroad.

For the second season of operation, the railroad's developers made in-house additions of buildings, shops, and The Red Garter Saloon using help from the local residents. The various stages of development of a functional park were planned out with each season adding new attractions, shops, stores and shows. The town portion of the park went by the operating name of "Tombstone Junction" and the railroad went by the operating name of "Old #77". However, the corporate name for the entire operation was "Cumberland Falls Scenic Railroad, Inc." Locals referred to the park as simply "The Junction."

== The "Town" and Country Western Environment ==
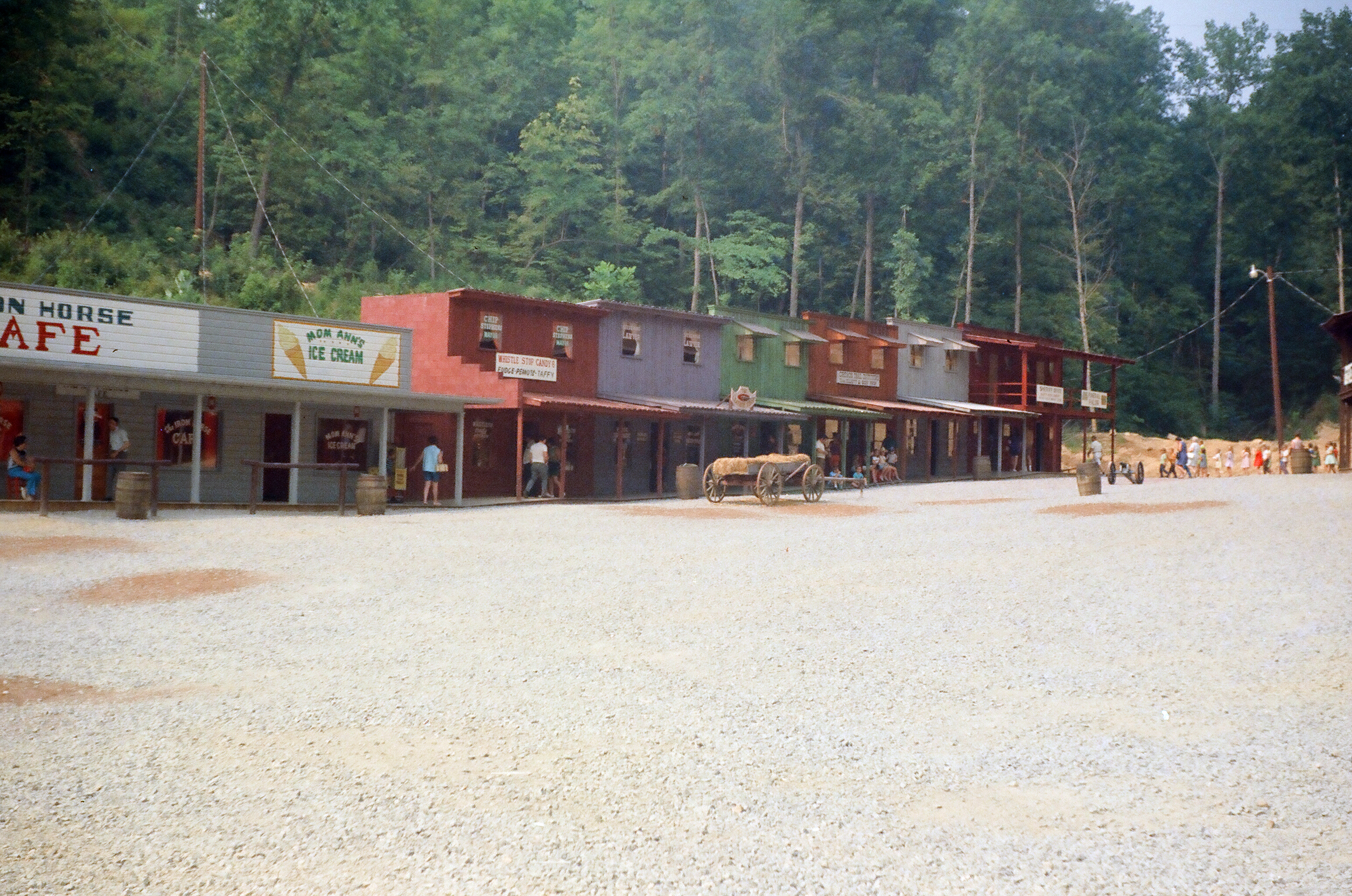
Tombstone Junction, KY

Outside of the scenic railroad the park consisted primarily of the "town" area of Tombstone Junction. This consisted of a faux western era town which was entered through a wooden fort entrance which housed the ticket office. The town consisted of the Red Garter Saloon where magic and stage shows were held, an outdoor theater where shows for park guest entertainers were staged, as well as several buildings such as the train station, jail, gift shops, boutiques, etc. A themed building known as "Pa's Cabin" which acted as a poor mans fun house allowed visitors to traverse a wilderness cabin where the interior floor had been slated at a steep angle. There was also a faux grave yard known as "Boot Hill".

Local residents were also used as characters to populate the town of Tombstone Junction. The local community was very involved in the park. The park focused on audience-involving stage shows, gunfights, music shows, and a group of gunfighters who interacted with the visitors. This was to make up for the fact that outside of the train ride the park never operated any mechanical rides.

Tombstone Junction was perhaps most known for bringing nationally known entertainers to the South Central Kentucky area and offering family entertainment to the area for a reasonable price. Entertainers such as The Judds, Randy Travis, Dolly Parton, Kenny Rogers, Barbara Mandrell, Conway Twitty, and Loretta Lynn were part of the Sunday Concert Series that took place every Sunday from April to October. Every Sunday brought a famous recording artist or band to The Junction and they performed on the Outdoor Stage.

== The Cumberland Falls Scenic Railroad AKA Old 77 ==
=== Old #77 ===
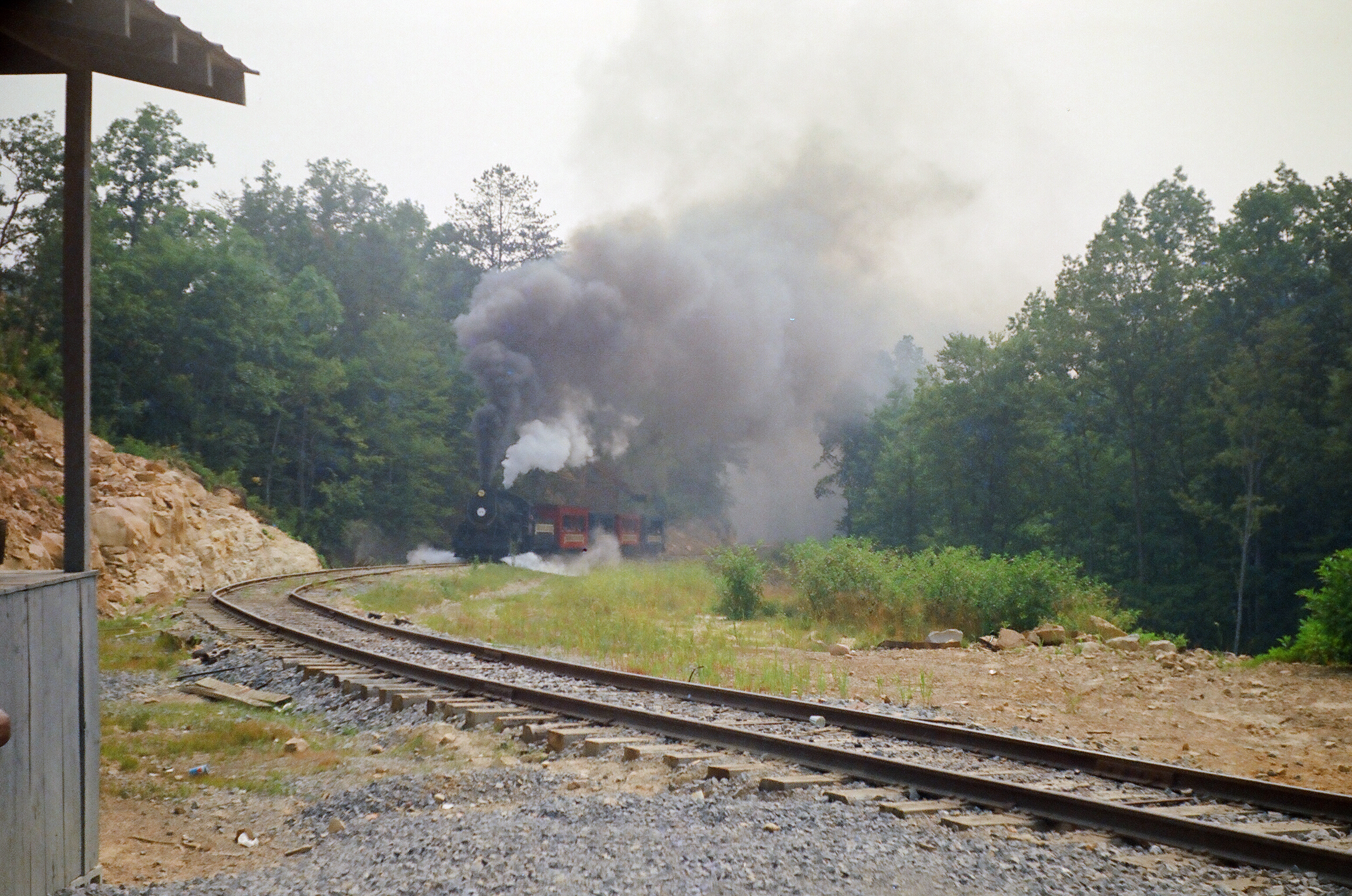
#77 locomotive, Tombstone Junction, KY

The park's biggest attraction was "Old #77", a full-sized fully operational standard gauge steam train.

Passengers boarded and departed at the park's only station. This was situated almost directly in the center of the park and served as a focal point for the rest of the operation. The station also housed the park's business offices where files were kept and housed an extensive collection of autographed photos from country-western stars that had visited the park.

The route was a 2 1/2 mile L-shaped self-contained loop of track with the town of Tombstone Junction on one end that traveled through the wooded hills of the Falls area and came back again. The line featured steep overlooks, sharp turns, and rough track. It was actually a very close representation of what riding a hastily laid early 20th century rail line would have been. A prominent feature of the line was a steep grade the locomotive had to traverse just before the train would complete the loop and return to the park station. The grade started at 4% which then rose to 6% and the finally a short stretch that abruptly rose to 8% just before the train had to make an extremely tight 180-degree turn in front of the station to get positioned for the next trip. This turn being so tight that the grab irons on the fireman's side of the tender would scrape the grab irons on the back of the cab. This made for fantastic smoke and sound as the rod engine worked hard on what normally would have been a geared locomotive environment.

The 180-degree turn the line made in front of the train station was so tight that running the locomotive through it occasionally proved problematic. On one specific occasion the locomotive was being operated by engineer Bill Johnson and fireman Don Vanover, the locomotives sanders had accidentally been left on as it entered the curve which caused the drivers to "bite" the rail, this caused the locomotive to physically lift itself up and off the track. The derailment occurred next to the amphitheater stage just prior to the start of a Loretta Lynn performance. This was at the top of the 8% grade that the train had to pull which made re-railing the locomotive difficult.

At the trip's halfway point, the ride featured a train robbery where the train was stopped by "bandits" who would rob the train until the Tombstone Junction sheriff rode up and had a drawing match with the ringleader. The winner varied. The "robbery" was held at the bottom of the grade and was not only for the entertainment of the tourists, but also gave the engine crew time to service the engine and build a full head of steam to pull the steep mountain grade back into the park.

Additional to the ride loop was a short spur which lead to a small "yard" containing a storage track for additional equipment and a short track into a maintenance shed.

=== Locomotives and cars ===
The park owned three steam locomotives. When the railroad was originally built in the 1960s, two former U.S. Army 0-6-0T saddle tank locomotives were purchased as Army surplus with the idea that they would power the train ride. These locomotives were U.S. Army #5002 and #5014, both USATC S100 class tank engines, built by H.K. Porter & Co. in 1942. However, the steep grades proved too much for these engines and their use was abandoned almost from the start. These engines were moved to a spare equipment track next to the park's maintenance shed where they were displayed until the park's closing.

The third engine and the one that proved powerful enough to pull the train over the steep grades was a 90-ton 0-6-0 ALCO switcher originally built for the Union Railroad in Pennsylvania as their #77. #77 was a USRA design that had actually been developed by Lima Locomotive Works, but was contracted to be built by the American Locomotive Company at its Schenectady, New York works in January 1944 (serial number 71323). It was later sold to the Morehead and North Fork Railroad in Morehead, KY as their #14. After the M&NF dieselized on April 1, 1963, #14 was purchased for the park from the M&NF and renumbered back to #77. #77 was moved by rail from Morehead to the Kentucky and Tennessee Railway yards at Stearns, Kentucky. From there it was trucked into the park where it was put into operation on the tourist railroad.

The locomotives were hand painted and usually featured a paint scheme consisting of flat black and large hand painted banners with "Cumberland Falls Scenic RailRoad" in large block letters during the park's earliest years. Sometime in the 1970s this herald was changed to "Tombstone Junction Railroad”.

The 5 passenger cars were modified wooden B&O Railroad cabooses. These had the cupolas removed, large open windows cut out of the sides, and seating installed from old, scrapped school buses. The cars were painted a bright shade of red with large painted banners reading "Cumberland Falls Scenic Railroad" on the sides during the park's earliest years. In later years the coaches were each painted a bright shade of orange, blue, yellow, and green with a hand painted banner reading "Tombstone Junction". The 5th coach retained its original red color but saw less and less service in the park's later years and was usually seen on a side track as an "extra" coach.

Also on site was an old, open-top hopper car of unknown origin, presumably used as ballast spreader car. This was kept on a siding next to the displayed 0-6-0T saddle tankers during the park's operation.

After Tombstone Junction ceased operation, the rail equipment was sold at auction. Harmon Taylor of Stearns, KY bought the 0-6-0 Alco "Old 77" so that it would stay in McCreary County. The two smaller locomotives were sold to other interests.

Number 77, as of 2023, is located in the old steam shop building of the Kentucky & Tennessee Railway in Stearns, KY. An attempt was made to restore the locomotive to operation for use on the Big South Fork Scenic Railway which operates over the K&T's tracks. Several years of restoration efforts ultimately failed to bring the locomotive back to operation. Major faults with project management ultimately led to the restoration effort being dropped after the expenditure of over 1.5 million dollars, with a significant portion of that being provided by public funds. The engine was placed in storage in the back of the steam shop building in a disassembled state. The restoration also resulted in the loss of a lot of the engine's "original fabric" from the park days as the original tender was completely scrapped (save for the steel deck) and rebuilt new. The original cab was scrapped, as well as the original smoke box and major portions of plumbing deemed unfit for service.

In 2022 the McCreary County Historical Society (operator's of the Big South Fork Scenic Railway) won a lawsuit against Wasatch Railroad Contractors of Cheyenne, WY (the company hired to restore #77 to operation) and were awarded an amount of $700,000. This lawsuit was the result of Wastasch's failure to get the locomotive operating for the agreed estimate and that the work that had been completed was found to be extremely shoddy by an independent inspector. However, the group was never able to collect the awarded amount as Wasatch Railroad Contractors went bankrupt and dissolved shortly thereafter due to several other lawsuits against them. In June 2022 the owner and founder of Wasatch Railroad Contractors, John Rimmasch, was found guilty of multiple counts of wire fraud and falsifying invoices to the Federal Park Service in a federal lawsuit in relation to the restoration of a passenger coach for the Steamtown Historic Site in Pennsylvania. Mr. Rimmasch was later sentenced to 30 months in federal prison and three years of supervised release.

0-6-0T #5002 was sold to a private collector who stored it at the Kentucky Railway Museum in New Haven, KY for several years. In 2016 it was moved from KRM to the Colebrookdale Railroad in Pennsylvania where a restoration effort was begun to restore it. It was then sold again, and is now in a full rebuild by the military Railroad Society in Baraboo, WI.

0-6-0T #5014 was sold to the California State Railroad Museum where it was used as a parts source in restoring their 0-6-0T Granite Rock Co. #10. Afterwards, the remaining hulk of that locomotive were donated to a historical organization which placed it on display in Goldfield, Nevada.

The coaches and ballast car were scrapped on site after auction.

== Red Garter Saloon and outdoor amphitheater shows ==
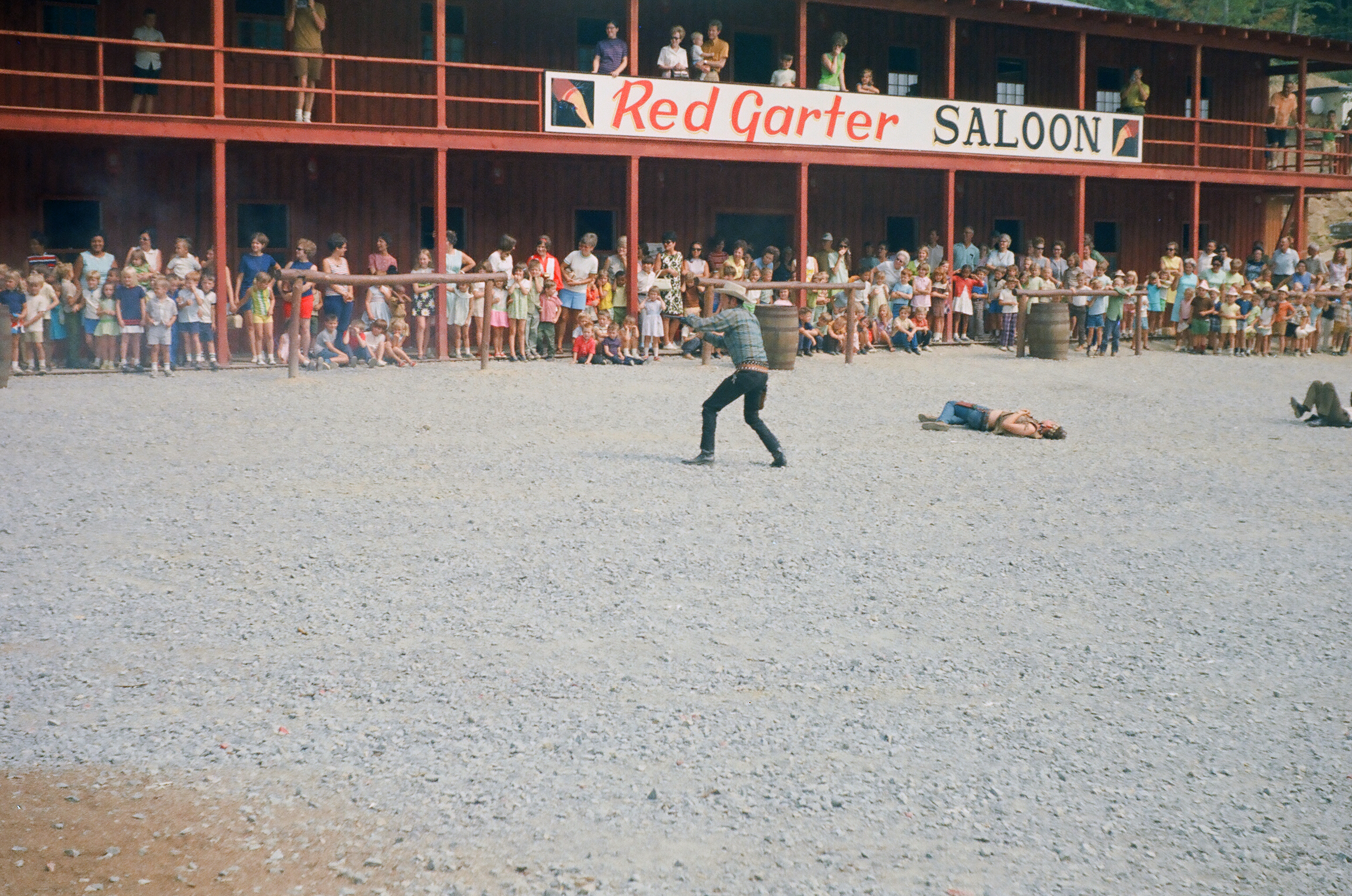
Red Garter Saloon, Tombstone Junction, KY

Stage shows were produced in The Red Garter Saloon and the outdoor stage.

The first Red Garter Saloon represented a "movie western" saloon featuring a main floor surrounded by an upper deck with more tables for extra seating. It also featured a saloon-type bar for beverage sales. In the center of the saloon was a large elevated stage complete with ornamental curtains where the shows were staged. This building was where all of the music shows for the house band were performed. There were also special Saturday Night Concerts offered by the house band during the summer, which was a separately ticketed event that took place after the "town" area of the park had closed for the day. This saloon burned near the end of the 1974 season.

When the 1975 season opened, a new Red Garter Saloon opened with a raised stage on the south end and a fast food counter at the north end of the first floor. The second floor of the Saloon housed apartments where members of the Stephens family (park owners) lived during the summer season. Another change occurred when the new saloon opened in that the house band's music shows moved to a new outdoor amphitheater stage and the new Red Garter Saloon became the permanent home of the magic shows. Three world-class magicians who "learned the ropes" of entertaining by beginning their professional careers at Tombstone Junction are Whit Haydn, Lance Burton, and Mac King. During their years at The Junction these soon-to-be-famous magicians performed three shows a day in The Red Garter Saloon.

The outdoor amphitheater was where concerts were held starring local bands as well as famous stars from the country and western music genre. Regulars included Conway Twitty and Loretta Lynn. The theater was an octagonal structure with a roof supported by posts covering rows of bench seats that spread from the stage in three tiers. There were no walls except the three that covered the back portion of the stage to force sound out into the crowd. There was no floor as the roof and stage were simply built over an open spot of gravel.

== Decline ==
Park co-owner Millard Stephens died in November 1974. Concurrent with the death of Millard Stephens, just a few months after the park's first major fire. Morris Stephens' death in August 1976 compounded issues with family control of the park, eventually leading to a sale in early 1989.

In July 1983, the park's second major fire destroyed five buildings, including a jail, sheriff's office, bank, video arcade, and print shop, while a sixth was damaged. Damages exceeded $100,000. While injuries were narrowly avoided, it was the park's second major fire-related incident in less than a decade, and unfortunately not its last as the incident would set a precedent for the park's final eight years open.

Compounding the losses of the second fire, the economy of the region in which the park was located was based almost entirely on the coal mining industry. The Kentucky coal industry suffered major job losses and mine closures beginning in the late 1980s continuing to the present. The resulting job losses and loss of income resulted in sharp drops in ticket sales to locals.

The rise of the nearby Dollywood theme park and explosive growth of nearby Pigeon Forge, Tennessee and Gatlinburg, Tennessee hurt attendance at Tombstone as well. The small park's limited amenities and attractions and nearby town's lack of additional destinations could not compete with the increasingly significant tourism draw a couple of hours away and lost the competition for regional ticket sales.

=== Park's End ===
The park was heavily damaged by a second fire in late 1989. The Red Garter Saloon was destroyed as well as several town buildings. While the park remained largely operational, business dropped as many locals began to believe the park had closed due to seasonal and fire-related closures as well as the park's 1989 sale. In the park's final years, the Summer Concert Series evolved into the park's marquee attraction, however, the park's third fire on October 2, 1991 destroyed the remainder of the park's guest and support structures save only for some out-buildings and the train. While initial statements after the fire suggested the park intended to reopen by June 1992, facing sharp declines in the local economy, limited ticket sales outside of the summer concert series, and with limited capital to rebuild, the decision to end operations was made almost immediately. An absolute auction was held in May 1995 for what was left of the park.

The Kentucky & Tennessee Railway in nearby Stearns, KY bought the track and a scrap company bought the old converted wooden cabooses. This resulted in the park's final fire. During the scrapping process for the wooden coaches, the bodies of the cars were accidentally set on fire with a cutting torch, with the fire quickly getting out of hand. The scrap company employee, not wishing to get blamed for damaging the #77 locomotive to which the cars were still attached, pulled the coupling between the cars and the locomotive as well as quickly cutting safety cables in the hopes the cars would roll away from the locomotive.

The cars now fully ablaze not only rolled away from the locomotive but continued to roll down the steep grade leading out of the park heading to the other end of the track loop. At the bottom of the hill, workers from the K&T Railway had begun the process of removing the rail. The cars ran into the removed track and piled on top of each other burning up in a heap. The remaining steel was scrapped on site.

== The park today ==
As of 2023, very little remains of Tombstone Junction. Mainly what is left is the bi-level parking lot and the rusting entrance gate. There is also the foundation of the saloon and the water stand pipe used to fill the locomotive's boiler for the train ride is still in place.

The most well preserved piece is "Pa's Cabin", the small cabin built with a tilted interior. This structure stood in relatively good condition until 2007. Since then, the roof has completely caved in.

The train station stood until the early 2000s when it was burned down by vandals. The concrete vault built inside the station still remains sitting on its foundation. The parks repair shop barn stood until around 2005 when it was also burned down by vandals.

Crossties and ballast from the railroad can still be found in certain spots.

The large sign that greeted people at the parking lot entrance located on KY 90 stood until 2004. It featured a large painted portrait of a gunslinger under an arched herald reading "Tombstone Jct". Under which a gas station-like sign with moveable letters noted the acts playing in a particular week. This stood in reasonable condition through the 1990s but began to deteriorate quickly in the 2000s until collapsing completely. Some of the phone poles used to support the sign have been dragged over into the entrance-way to form a barrier and hinder pedestrian and vehicle traffic from curious onlookers.

== Photos and video ==
Another unique feature of Tombstone Junction is the rarity of photographs and notable lack of home video of the park in operation compared to other theme parks during the era. Some photos are available among several blog websites of people who remember the park. These photos usually date to the 1970s and mostly consist of pictures of and from the train. Pictures of the actual park are even rarer.

Home video of the park is almost non-existent; however, there is a rare video taken by engineer Bill Johnson of the train ride in 1989 just before that year's fire and features several views of the park in its final days of operation. The rest of the video consists of run-bys of the train taken by Bill Slone as well as a trip around the entire track loop from the cab of the locomotive that was taken by Engineer Bill Johnson while operating the locomotive. This video can be found on YouTube if one searches the park's name. Footage of the train robbery show has also surfaced.
