= Dog Slaughter Falls =

Waterfall in Kentucky, United States

Coordinates: 36.858206°N 84.311456°W

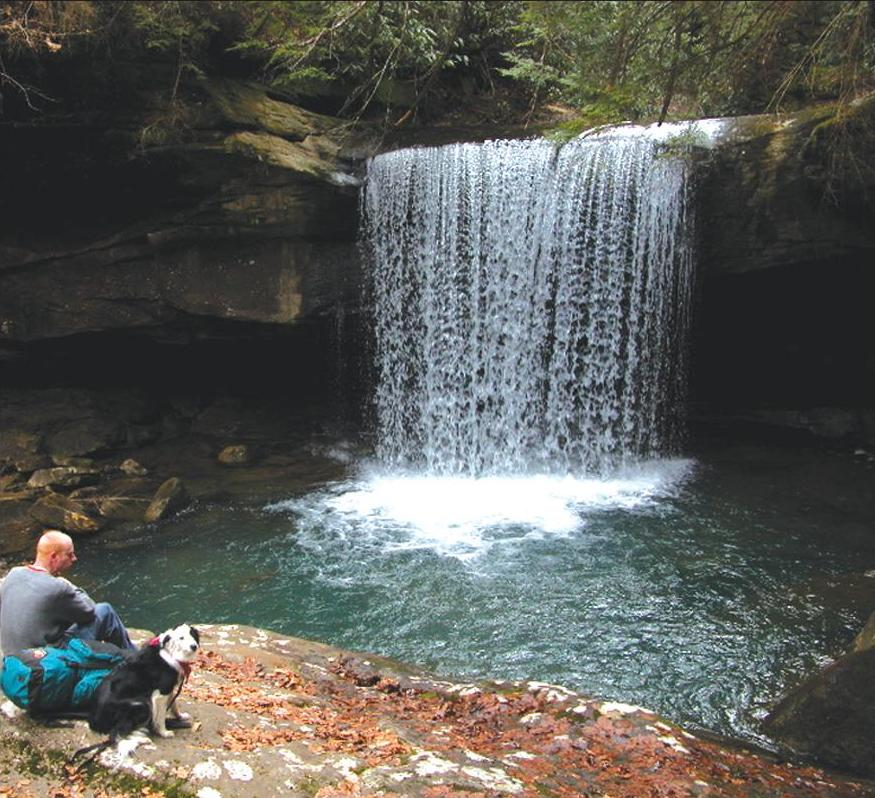
Dog Slaughter Falls, image from the United States Forest Service

Dog Slaughter Falls is a 15 feet (4.6 m) to 20 feet (6.1 m) tall waterfall at the confluence of the Cumberland River and Dog Slaughter Creek, in the London Ranger District of the Daniel Boone National Forest in Whitley County, Kentucky. It is accessible via the Sheltowee Trace Trail, traveling downstream of Cumberland Falls, or via the Dog Slaughter Trail. The falls is rumored to be named for the drowning of unwanted pets, or the loss of hunting dogs to predatory wildlife.

== See also ==
- List of waterfalls
- List of waterfalls of Kentucky
