= Eagle Falls (Kentucky) =

Waterfall in Kentucky, United States

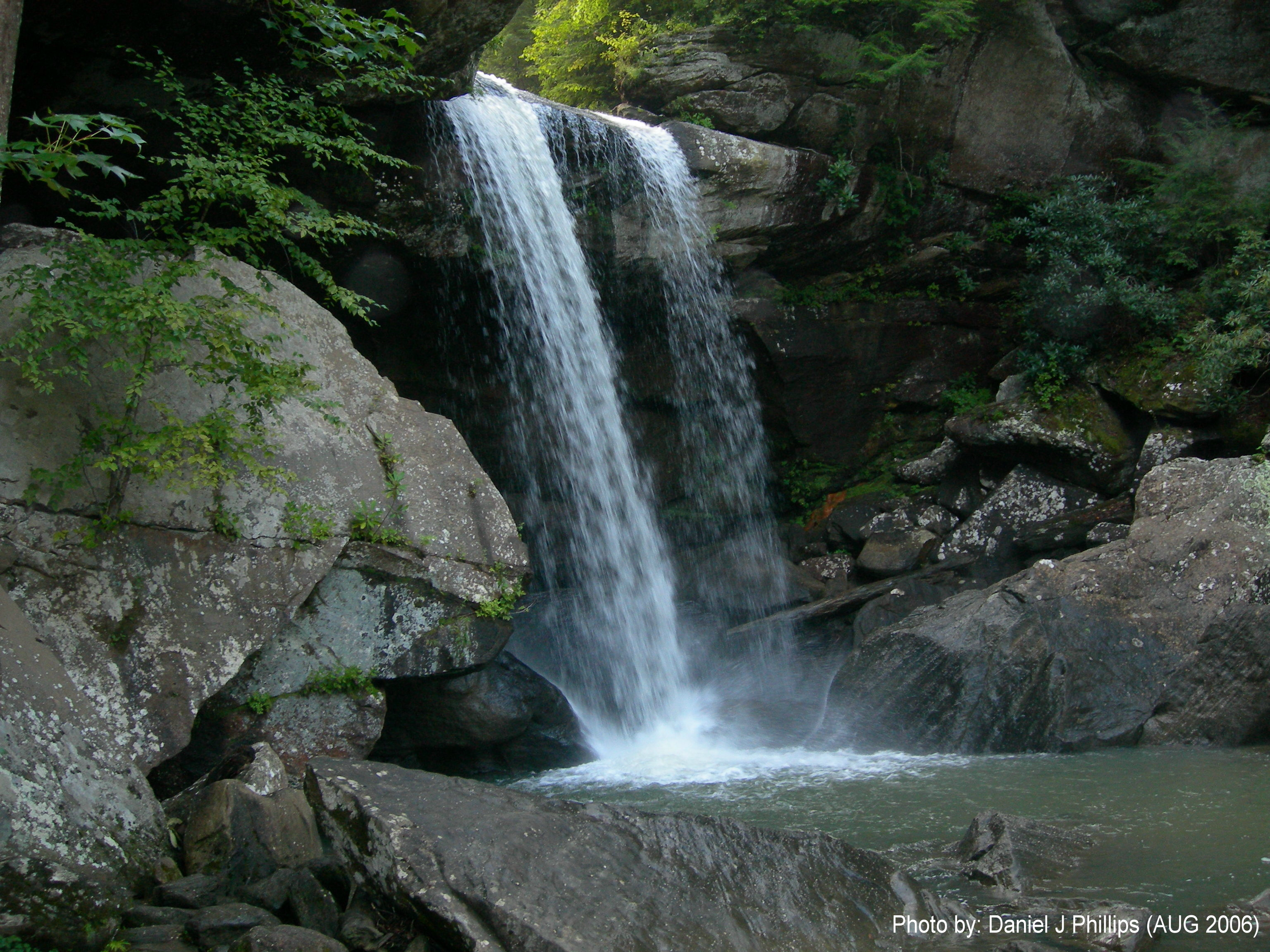
- Eagle Falls.
- Interactive map of Eagle Falls
- Location: Cumberland Falls State Resort Park, McCreary County, Kentucky, United States
- Coordinates: 36°50′34″N 84°20′39″W
- Type: Plunge/Vertical
- Total height: 44 ft (13 m)
- Number of drops: 1
- Watercourse: Eagle Creek

Eagle Falls is located in Cumberland Falls State Resort Park in McCreary County, Kentucky, United States. Water from Eagle Creek descends 44 feet (13 m) before landing on the rocks below on the Cumberland River shoreline. Eagle Falls can be accessed by hiking Trail 9 located on Kentucky Route 90 in the Cumberland Falls State Park. The trail to Eagle Falls is 2.5 miles one direction(2.4 km) and includes some of the best views of Cumberland Falls.

== See also ==
- List of waterfalls
- List of waterfalls in Kentucky
