= Tioga Falls =

Waterfall in Kentucky, US

Coordinates: 37.961°N 85.974°W

Tioga Falls is a 130-foot waterfall located near the outskirts of West Point, Kentucky. The falls are fed from the nearby Tioga Creek, a tributary to the Ohio River. The falls are accessed by way of a 1.8 mi (2.9 km) trial managed by the U.S. Army Garrison at Fort Knox. As Tioga Falls are within the boundaries of the military base, the trail is periodically closed to the public for safety reasons.

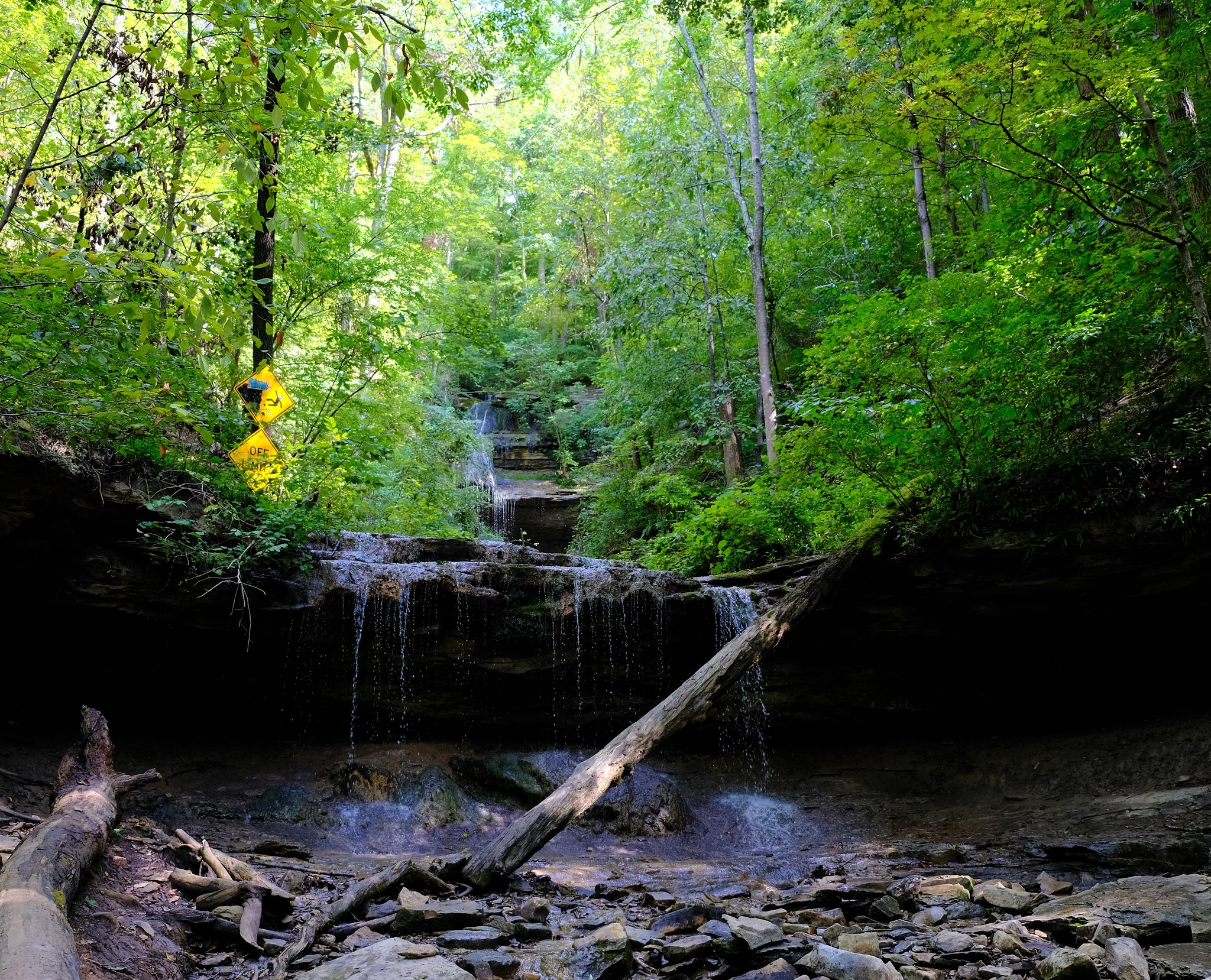
* Tioga Falls

== See also ==
- List of waterfalls
- List of waterfalls in Kentucky
