= Cumberland Falls State Resort Park =

Park in Kentucky, United States

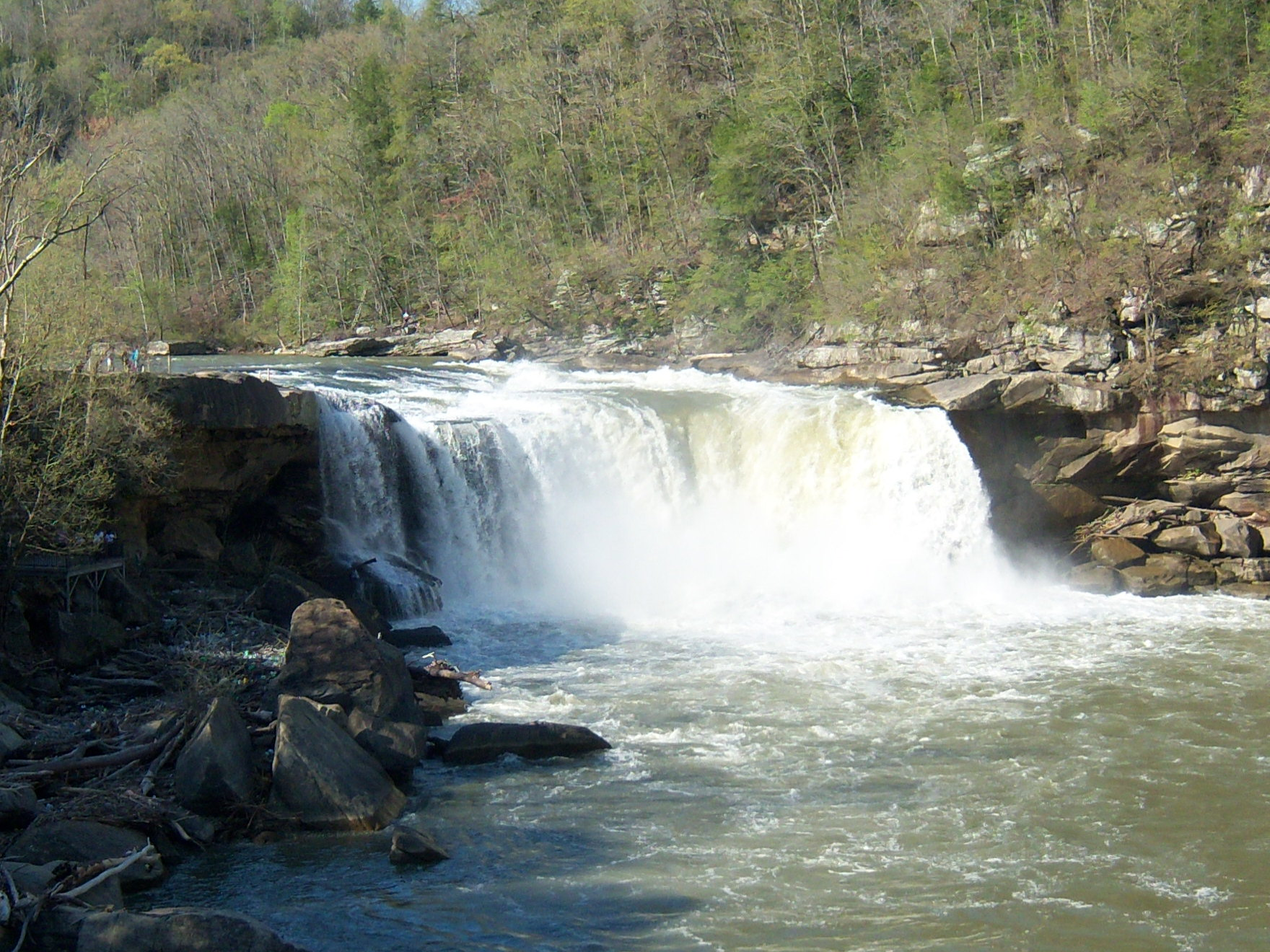
- Cumberland Falls

- Location within Kentucky Location within the United States
- Type: Kentucky state park
- Location: McCreary County & Whitley County, Kentucky, United States
- Nearest city: Corbin, Kentucky
- Coordinates: 36°50′27″N 84°19′58″W
- Area: 1,657 acres (671 ha)
- Elevation: 1,073 feet (327 m)
- Established: August 21, 1931
- Operator: Kentucky Department of Parks
- Visitors: 750,000+ (in 2009)
- Status: Open year-round
- Website: Official website

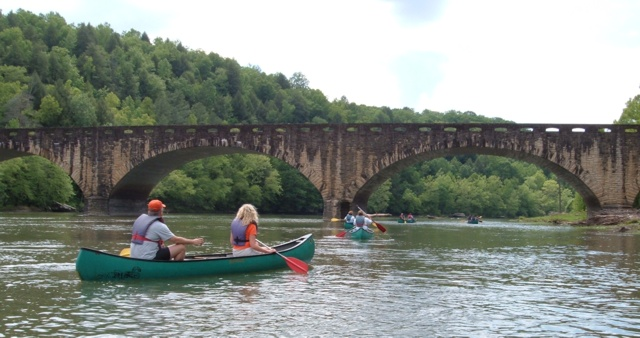
Edward Moss Gatliff Bridge

Cumberland Falls State Resort Park is a park located just southwest of Corbin, Kentucky, and is contained entirely within the Daniel Boone National Forest. The park encompasses 1,657 acres (671 ha) and is named for its major feature, 68-foot-tall (21 m) Cumberland Falls. The falls are one of the few places in the western hemisphere where a moonbow can frequently be seen on nights with a full moon. The park is also the home of 44-foot (13 m) Eagle Falls. The section of the Cumberland River that includes the falls was designated a Kentucky Wild River by the Kentucky General Assembly through the Office of Kentucky Nature Preserves' Wild Rivers System. The forest in the park is also a dedicated State Nature Preserve.

== History ==
After the discussion of building a hydroelectric power plant above the falls in 1927, Kentucky native T. Coleman du Pont offered to buy the falls and surrounding acreage in order to create a state park. Although he died before he could purchase the land, his wife purchased the falls and the 593 acres (240 ha) surrounding it for $400,000 on March 10, 1930, after the Kentucky General Assembly (legislature) approved the creation of the state park. Cumberland Falls was dedicated as a state park at 1:30 p.m. on August 21, 1931.

Following a $2 million renovation project in 2006, the park received an upgraded rating from two diamonds to three diamonds from the American Automobile Association (AAA) in 2007. Kentucky Dam Village State Resort Park also received the upgraded rating. The two facilities were the first state resort parks to achieve the three-diamond rating following AAA's revision of its rating system in 2001.

== Recreation ==
- Visitor center
- Interpretive center
- Tennis Court
- Playgrounds
- Firepits
- Picnic tables in each cabin group, perfect for a cookout
- Mountain biking
- Hiking - approximately 20 miles of trails
- Fishing in Cumberland River
- Horseback rides
- Pool (recently refurbished)
- Different activities by the week for guests of the park such as square dancing, archery, arts and crafts, group hikes, and animal encounters
- White water rafting and canoeing on Cumberland River

== The Dupont Lodge ==
- 51 guest rooms
- 3 stories
- Home to the Riverview Restaurant which serves breakfast, lunch, and dinner
- Patio outlook onto the Cumberland River
- Maid services provided
- Internet access

== Cabins ==
- Multiple modern one and two-bedroom
- Two different cabin groups
- In a standard one story cabin, there are two bedrooms, two bathrooms, a living room, a dining room and a kitchen
- There are also a few two-story cabins with the living room, kitchen, a half-bathroom, and a dining room upstairs, and the two bedrooms and connecting bathrooms downstairs
- Both cabin groups are dog-friendly
- Maid services provided
- Many cabins have been renovated
- Newly added internet access to both cabin groups
- There are "Woodland Suites" available that have the experience of a cabin, but at a smaller size and cheaper cost

== Events ==
- Backpacking 101 - (Several times a year)
- Native American Weekend - (March)
- Overnight Canoe Adventures - (April, May, October)
- Nature Photography Weekend - (April)
- Birding and Wildflower Weekend - (May)
- Kentucky Hills Craft Festival - (September)
- Moonbow Trail Trek - (November)

== Hazards ==
- The Daniel Boone National Forest is home to much wildlife, and although there are several beautiful animals, make sure to watch out for black bears and copperhead snakes
- The falls used to be an area of recreation for swimming, but that has been shut down due to the dangerous current of the river
- Each year people try to canoe over the falls, but this is very dangerous because of the rocks located underneath the waterfall

== In popular culture ==
- In Film

The 1955 western The Kentuckian, starring Burt Lancaster, was partly filmed at Cumberland Falls.

An establishing shot of Cumberland Falls is used in the 1997 action film Fire Down Below starring Steven Seagal.

- In Literature

Silas House, the poet laureate of Kentucky, published a popular poem called "Cumberland Falls" in The Bitter Southerner magazine that uses the falls as a setting and a metaphor. It was also selected as a featured poem by the Academy of American Poets. Cumberland Falls also serves as a scene setting in Lee Cole's 2022 novel, Groundskeeping, House's 2001 novel Clay's Quilt, and Kim Trevathan's 2006 memoir, Coldhearted River.
