= List of waterfalls in Kentucky =

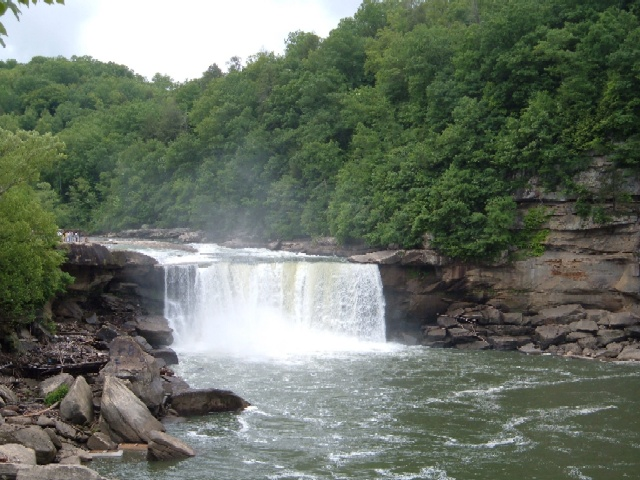
Cumberland Falls in 2005

The following is a list of waterfalls in the US state of Kentucky.

- Bad Branch Falls Kentucky, in Letcher County near source of Cumberland River
- Cumberland Falls, located in the Cumberland Falls State Resort Park
- Dog Slaughter Falls, located downstream of the Cumberland Falls State Resort Park
- Eagle Falls, located in the Cumberland Falls State Resort Park
- Northrup Falls, located one mile east of the Colditz Cove State Natural Area
- Seventy Six Falls, located in Clinton County, Kentucky
- Slave Falls, located on the Fork Ridge Road Sawmill Trailhead
- Star Creek Falls, located on the Cumberland River
- Tioga Falls located in West Point Ky
- Yahoo Falls, located in the Big South Fork National River and Recreation Area

== See also ==
- List of waterfalls
