= Seventy Six Falls =

Waterfall in Clinton County, Kentucky

Coordinates: 36.780066°N 85.126344°W

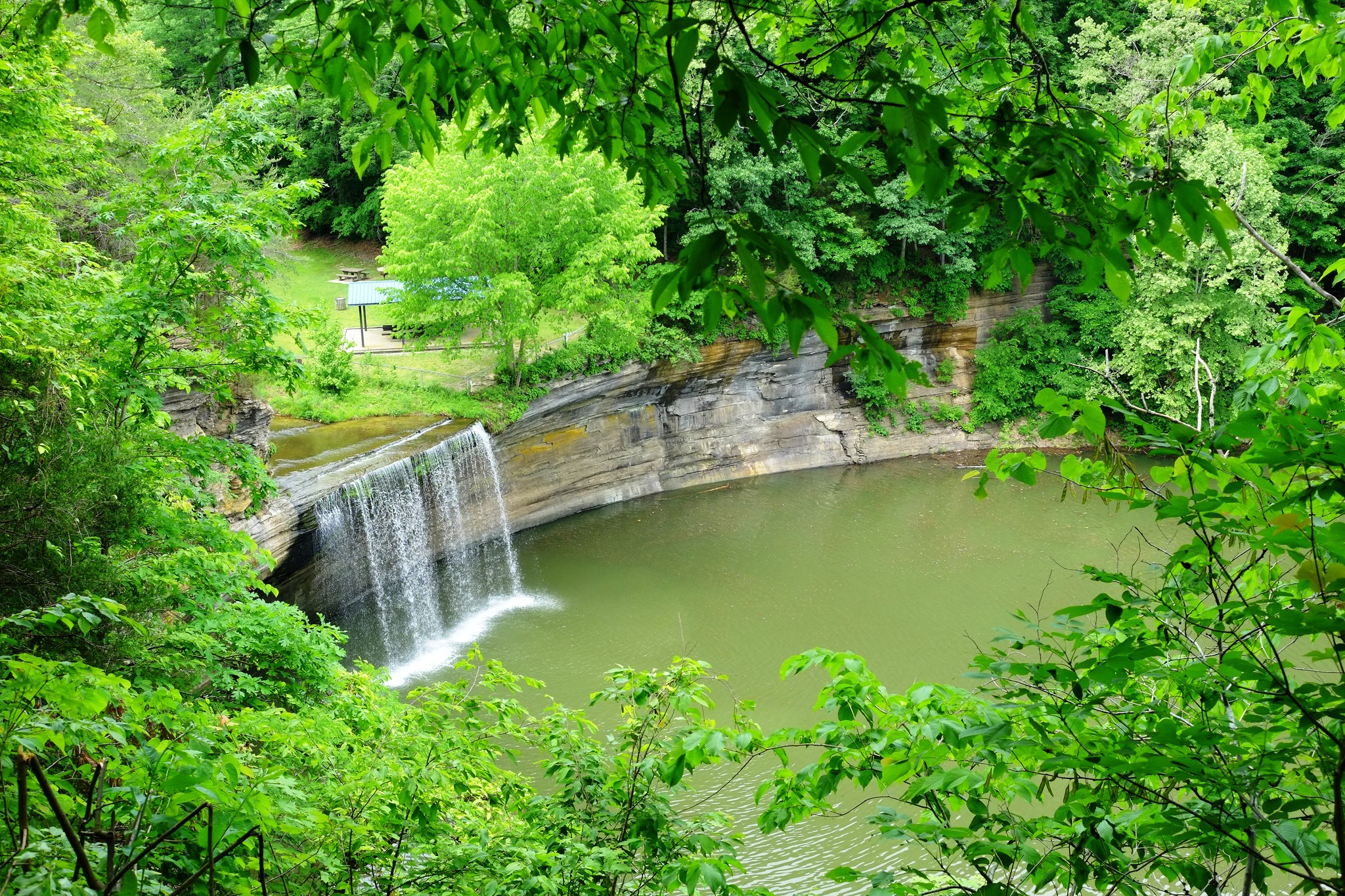
Seventy Six Falls waterfall spilling into lake Cumberland.

Seventy Six Falls is a waterfall in Clinton County, Kentucky, in the United States. It is along Indian Creek.

Seventy Six Falls may have been named for the nearby community of Seventy Six, Kentucky. There is a popular belief that it was named for its height before the impoundment of Lake Cumberland, but the height was about 84 feet. At normal pool of the lake the height is 38 feet. Another assertion is that the waterfall was named for the number of breaks, or small falls, on Indian Creek just before the cataract, but that is unlikely; clearly defining a specific number of such breaks is impossible because of varying water flow and small differences between them. The community may not have been named for the falls; some say the name came from a survey marker; others say it was named for 1776; it was settled around 1806, 30 years after U.S. independence. A post office named Goodson, for the postmaster, was established in 1830; Charles D. Semple renamed it Seventy Six in 1834. Several mills were once located on the creek above the falls, now the site of a park maintained by the U.S. Army Corps of Engineers, which manages Lake Cumberland.

== See also ==
- List of waterfalls
- List of waterfalls in Kentucky
