= Moonbow =

Rainbow produced by moonlight rather than sunlight

A moonbow (also known as a moon rainbow or lunar rainbow) is a rainbow produced by moonlight rather than direct sunlight. Other than the difference in the light source, its formation is the same as for a solar rainbow: It is caused by the refraction of light in many water droplets, such as a rain shower or a waterfall, and is always positioned in the opposite part of the sky from the Moon relative to the observer.

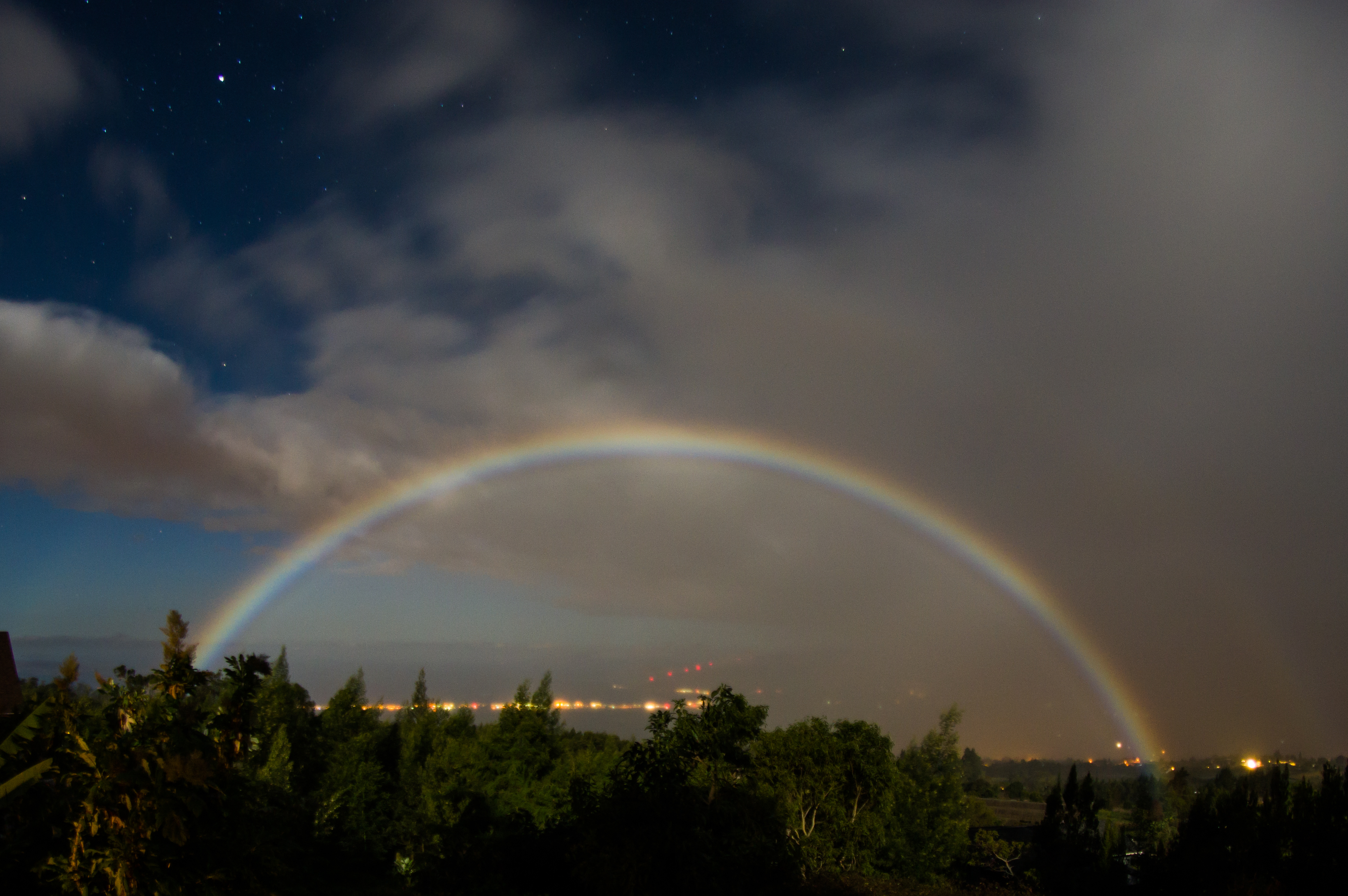
Lunar rainbow over Kihei, Maui, Hawaii, US

Moonbows are much fainter than solar rainbows, due to the smaller amount of light reflected from the surface of the Moon. Because the light is usually too faint to excite the cone color receptors in human eyes, it is difficult for the human eye to discern colors in a moonbow. As a result, a moonbow often appears to be white. However, the colors in a moonbow do appear in long exposure photographs.

Moonbows have been mentioned at least since Aristotle's Meteorology (circa 350 BC), and are associated with the ancient Greek lunar goddess, Selene.

== Viewing ==
Moonbows are most easily viewed when the Moon is at or nearest to its brightest phase full moon. For moonbows to have the greatest prospect of appearing, the Moon must be low in the sky (at an elevation of less than 42 degrees, preferably lower) and must not be obscured by cloud. In addition, the night sky must be very dark. Since the sky is not completely dark on a rising/setting full moon, this means they can only be observed two to three hours before sunrise (a time with few observers), or two to three hours after sunset. There must also be water droplets (e.g. from rain or spray) opposite the Moon. This combination of requirements makes moonbows much rarer than rainbows produced by the daytime sunlight. Moonbows may also be visible when rain falls during full moonrise at extreme latitudes during the winter months when the prevalence of the hours of darkness gives more opportunity for the phenomenon to be observed.

It is said that the definition of the colours depends upon the size of the moisture drops present in the air: the smaller they are the less vivid the colours. Below 1/500 inch diameter they usually refract more or less white light as the component colours are merged.

=== Locations ===
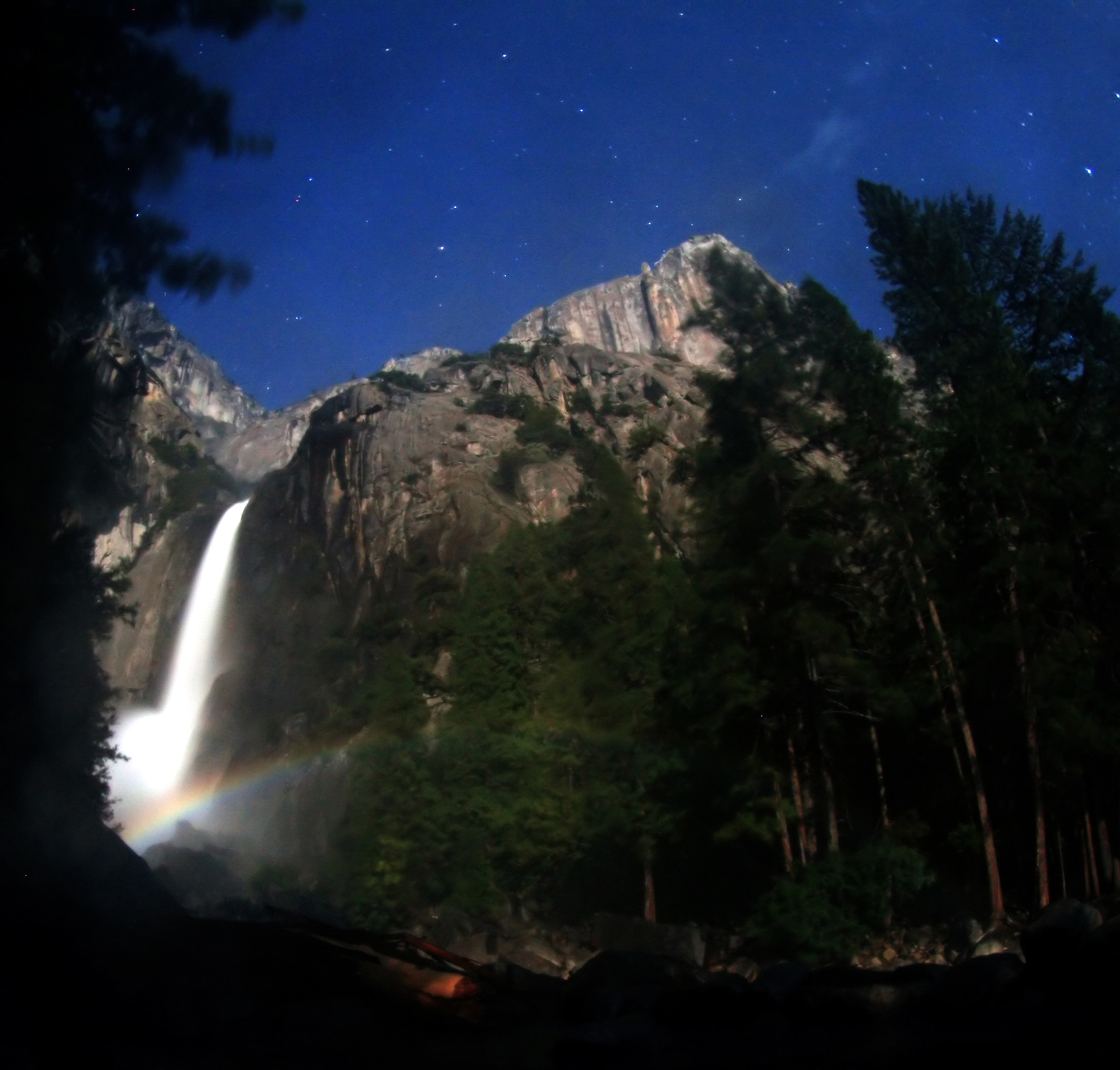
Spray moonbow at the Lower Yosemite Fall

Numerous places in the world feature spray-, fog- or mist-induced bows. In the United States such bows may be seen in relation to various waterfalls including Niagara Falls, New York, Yosemite National Park, California and Cumberland Falls, near Corbin, Kentucky. Victoria Falls, on the border between Zambia and Zimbabwe is also widely known for spray moonbows.

Spray moonbows are also seen with some regularity in the cloud forests of Costa Rica, in mountain towns like Monteverde and Santa Elena. These occur when clouds of mist are blown in from the Caribbean by the Christmas Winds. The Christmas Winds happen from the end of December through late January or early February. These clouds of mists create a streaming pattern of stripes giving rise to their popular name in Spanish, pelo de gato ("cat's hair). Moonbows happen in this part of Costa Rica almost every full moon in the months of December through February. The bows that are caused by Pelo de Gato are not limited to just before dawn but can happen after sunset too, but it does need a full or nearly full moon.

Moonbows are also found in wet regions of Hawaii, such as Kauai (with the moon rising in the east during light rain) and the Big Island of Hawaii.
