= Cumberland Falls =

Waterfall in the U.S. state of Kentucky

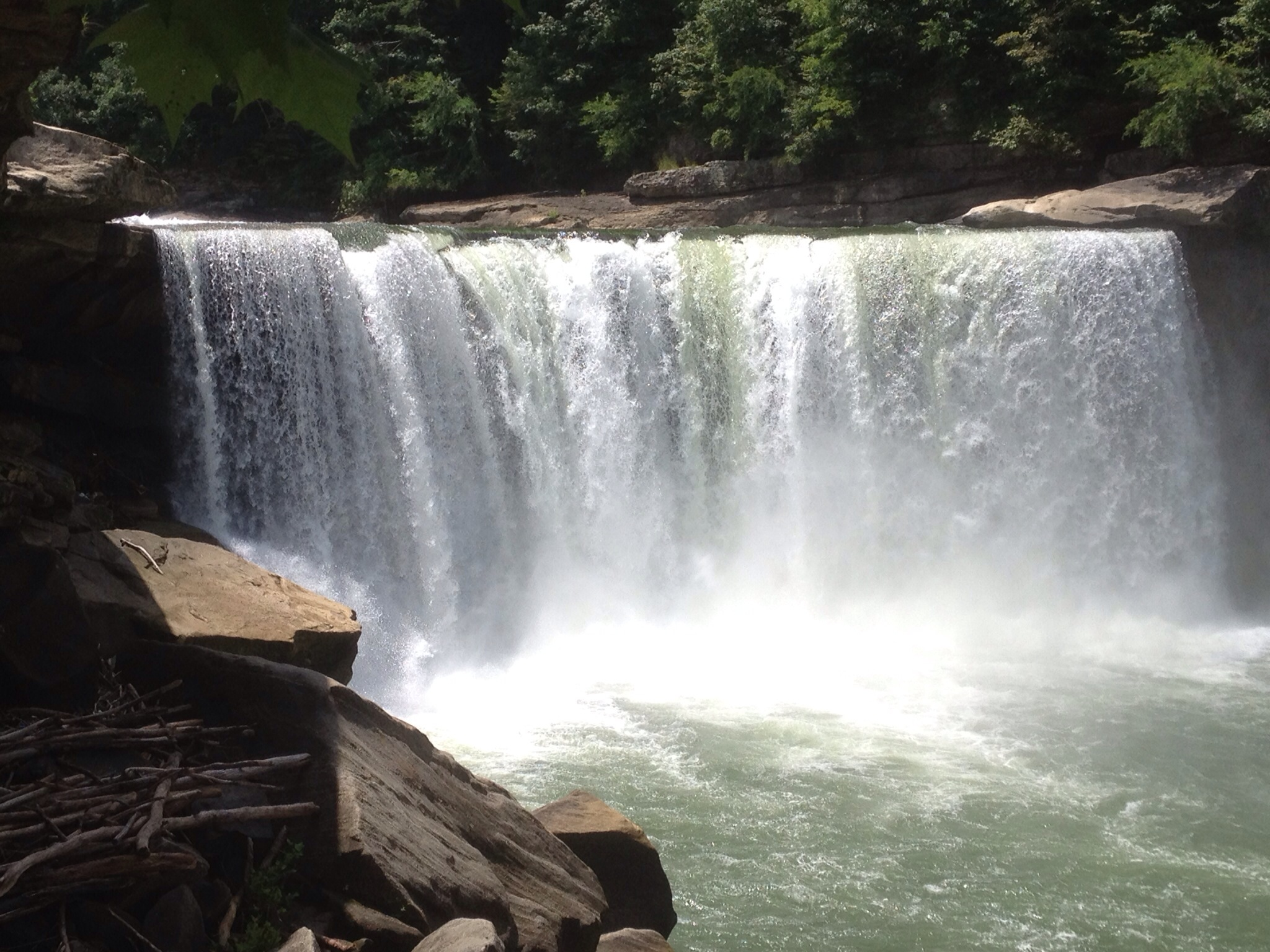
- Cumberland Falls
- Interactive map of Cumberland Falls
- Location: Cumberland Falls State Resort Park, McCreary County & Whitley County, Kentucky, United States
- Coordinates: 36.83801°N 84.34444°W
- Type: Block
- Total height: 69 ft (21 m)
- Number of drops: 1
- Watercourse: Cumberland River

Cumberland Falls, sometimes called the Little Niagara, the Niagara of the South, or the Great Falls, is a waterfall on the Cumberland River in southeastern Kentucky. Spanning the river at the border of McCreary and Whitley counties, the waterfall is the central feature of Cumberland Falls State Resort Park and is part of the Office of Kentucky Nature Preserves designated Wild River System.

It is believed the current falls formed as the result of erosion from its original starting place at an escarpment far downstream. The site of the falls was occupied in pre-modern times by a variety of indigenous peoples, and more recently has passed through multiple private owners until eventually being donated, along with surrounding land to Kentucky in 1933.

A moonbow is regularly visible at this site.

== History ==
=== Formation ===
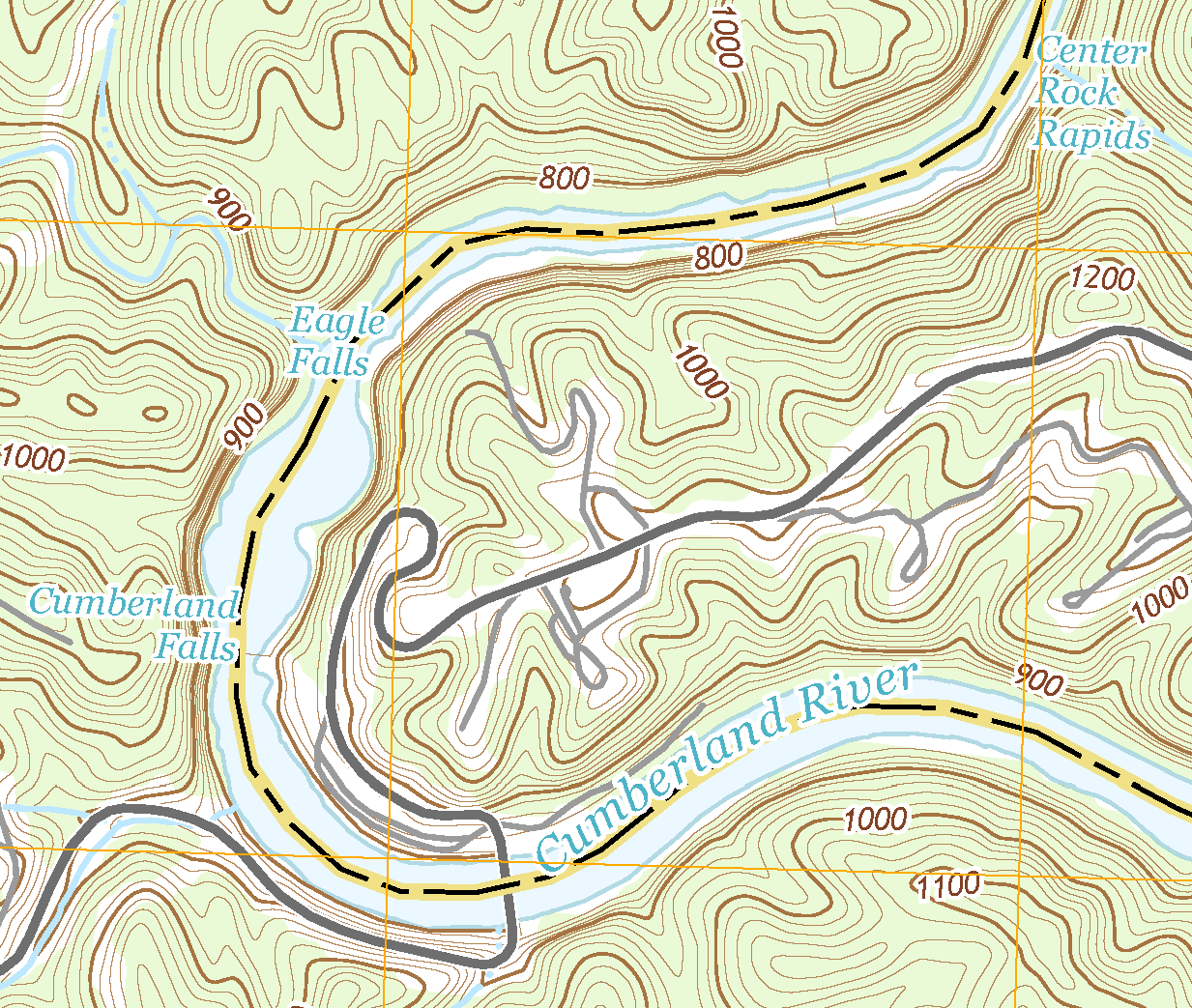
Detail of a USGS topographical map showing Cumberland Falls, the wide plunge pool immediately downstream (northward), as well as Eagle Falls on the west bank, and the rapids of Center Rock further downstream

It is believed that Cumberland Falls originated at the Pottsville Escarpment, near modern-day Burnside, Kentucky, and retreated to its current location approximately 45 miles (72 km) upstream. In its retreat, the falls cut what is now the Cumberland River gorge, reaching depths in places of up to 400 feet (120 m). At its original location, the falls was taller than it is currently, and has lost height due to erosion as it moved upstream. It also carried a greater volume of water originally, because two major tributaries, the Laurel River and the Rockcastle River, both lie between the modern day location and the escarpment. The erosion of the underlying rock, and movement of the falls downward in height, and upstream in location will continue until the falls eventually disappears, and the river again becomes smoothly graded.

=== Pre-modern history ===
The area surrounding Cumberland Falls was inhabited by Native Americans going as far back as 10,000 years. By 1650, the area had been visited by those from the Shawnee, Cherokee, Chickasaw, and the Creek peoples. The Cumberland, as well as the nearby Eagle Falls, were both considered sacred by many.

=== Modern history ===
In 1750, the Cumberland Falls was rediscovered by the explorer Thomas Walker who named it after the Duke of Cumberland and Strathearn. (Note: In his published papers Keen Johnson disputes this, saying that Walker and certain long hunters "evidently had been in the region," but that Matthew Walton and Adam Shepherd were the first to see the falls.) The first recorded landowners of the falls were Matthew Walton and Adam Shepard in 1800, both engineers who served under George Washington during the American Revolution. Walton and Shepard surveyed the land in 1814, and were issued a land patent in 1828.

The first landowners to settle permanently at Cumberland Falls were Lewis Renfro, a Baptist minister, and his wife Mary, who built a cabin there in 1850, which would later be used as a hospital during the American Civil War. (Note: Ludwick and Thomas Hess record one Samuel Garland at the location prior to Lewis Refro. They do not include a definite date, but say he "intended to build a water mill but instead built a cabin where he resided." According to the official Kentucky Parks website, Garland built a "cabin in which he resided for a while before returning to Virginia.") (Note: The tract of land granted to the Renfros accounted for 200 acres (81 ha) and was valued at $1,000.) The falls and 400 acres of surrounding land were purchased in 1875 by Socrates Owens, who there built the Cumberland Hotel, which was taken over by his wife Nannie and his son Edward following his death. The land and hotel were purchased in 1902 by Henry Brunson, who managed it along with his two daughters until 1931.

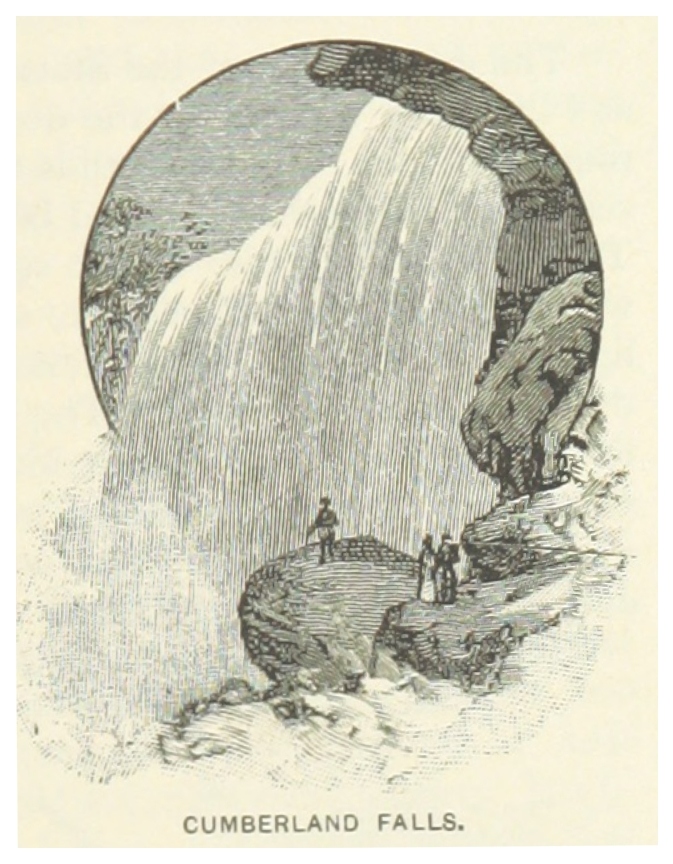
Illustration of the falls from the King's Hand-book of the United States, 1891

In 1927 the Kiwanis Club sponsored a trail to be built from nearby Corbin, Kentucky, and dedicated to Kentucky governor William J. Fields. Construction occupied some 200 laborers over nine weeks. However, as late as 1929, the Izaak Walton League wrote of access to the falls saying:

The unspoiled charm of Cumberland Falls is due to the fact that the falls are difficult to reach ... Road maps show roads leading from Corbin, twenty miles to the northeast, and from Williamsburg, eighteen miles from the southeast, but both these are so rough as to be practicable only for saddle-horses. (Note: See also Williamsburg, Kentucky.)

In 1928, a proposal to accept the falls as a park was brought to the floor of the Kentucky Senate but was defeated.

In the late 1920s, there were plans to build a hydroelectric power station upstream, and divert the river through a mountain tunnel to a point below the falls. However, the Cumberland Falls Preservation Association, formed by businessman Rober Blair, convinced T. Coleman du Pont to purchase the falls and surrounding land, and stipulate they were never to be used for hydroelectricity. In 1930, following his death, the family of du Pont made the decision to donate the 539 acres (218 ha) to the state. On March 10, 1930, the Kentucky House and Senate overrode the veto of Governor Flem D. Sampson, and voted to accept the land from the du Pont family. The park was officially opened on September 7, 1931.

In the 1950s, plans were again announced for the development of upstream hydroelectric power, but were again defeated by the Preservation Association.

In 2016, two professional whitewater kayakers, Dane Jackson and Nicholas Troutman, were charged with misdemeanor trespassing after intentionally going over Cumberland Falls in kayaks.

== Moonbow ==
During or near a full moon on clear nights, a lunar rainbow or moonbow is sometimes formed by the water of the falls. The formation of a moonbow at Cumberland Falls is aided by a combination of steep gorge walls, which reduce dissipation of the waterfall's mist by wind, and a wide gorge which allows increased levels of moonlight.

It is the only location in the Western Hemisphere where moonbows are known to appear with regularity, and the Kentucky Department of Parks publishes schedules for visitors. (Note: As of 2017, schedules are published online at the Kentucky Department of Parks website.) (Note: Moonbows would previously regularly occur at Niagara Falls, but can no longer been due to high levels of light pollution.)

The ability of visitors to see a moonbow may vary with water level. At low levels, the falls may not produce sufficient mist for the phenomenon. Conversely, if conditions include substantial downstream wind, this may increase the level of mist and make a moonbow more likely to be visible.

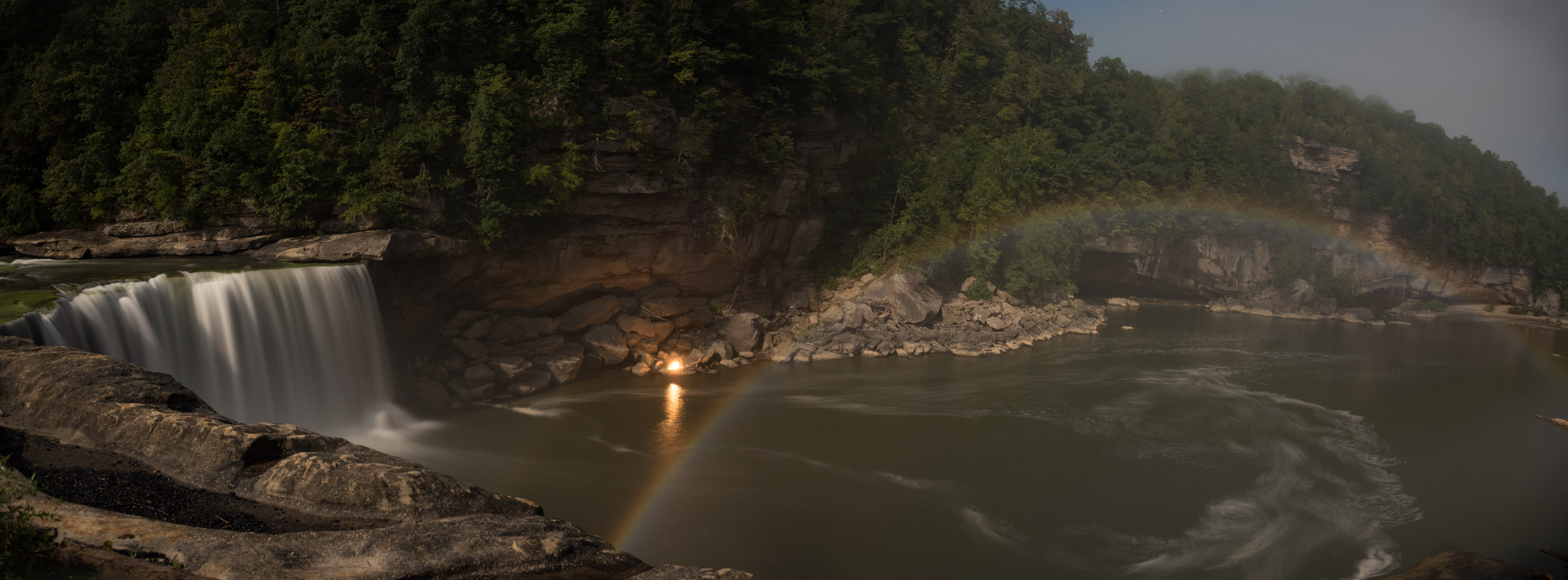
Cumberland Falls moonbow

== Statistics ==
Highest and lowest water flow years (1908–2015)
Year	Average
1927	5,196 ft^{3}/s
1994	5,143 ft^{3}/s
1974	5,117 ft^{3}/s
2011	4,974 ft^{3}/s
1973	4,684 ft^{3}/s
Year	Average
1981	1,657 ft^{3}/s
1931	1,622 ft^{3}/s
1966	1,499 ft^{3}/s
1941	1,423 ft^{3}/s
1988	1,324 ft^{3}/s

On average the falls, which flows over a resistant sandstone bed, is 68 feet (21 m) high and 125 feet (38 m) wide. Cumberland Falls is the second-largest waterfall east of the Rocky Mountains, and the largest waterfall as measured by water volume in the Eastern United States, south of Niagara Falls. The falls divides the river into two sections, the Upper and Lower, or "below the falls" section.

=== Water flow ===
The water which flows through the Cumberland Falls gathers from a drainage area of 1,977 square miles (5,120 km^{2}). In data collected between 1908 and 2017 by the United States Geological Survey, peak annual water flow at the falls occurred in 1927, at an average rate of 5,196 ft^{3}/s, and the all-time low occurred in 1988, during the 1988–89 North American drought, at an average rate of 1,324 ft^{3}/s. The all-time highest recorded water volume was on January 28, 1918, at a rate of 59,600 ft^{3}/s, and the lowest recorded annual peak water flow was on February 2, 1985, at 17,500 ft^{3}/s, but was partially due to water diversion. The lowest naturally occurring annual peak water flow was on February 17, 1964, at 18,200 ft^{3}/s.

== In popular culture ==
Film

- The Kentuckian, a 1955 movie starring Burt Lancaster, filmed on location
- Raintree County, a 1957 film starring Montgomery Clift, Elizabeth Taylor and others, filmed on location
- Fire Down Below, a 1997 movie starring Steven Seagal, includes a flyover of the falls

Literature

- Cumberland Falls serves as the setting and a metaphor in the popular poem "Cumberland Falls" written by Kentucky Poet Laureate Silas House. It was selected by the Academy of American Poets.

Video Games

- Red Dead Redemption 2 features a waterfall inspired by the falls. This waterfall is also called Cumberland Falls.

== See also ==
- Daniel Boone National Forest, in which Cumberland Falls is located
- List of waterfalls
- List of waterfalls of Kentucky
