= U.S. Route 27 in Kentucky =

Segment of American highway

U.S. Route 27
- US 27 highlighted in red

Route information
- Maintained by KYTC
- Length: 201.120 mi (323.671 km)
- Existed: November 11, 1926–present

Major junctions
- South end: US 27 at Tennessee state line near Strunk
- Cumberland Expressway / Hal Rogers Parkway near Somerset; US 150 in Stanford; US 68 in Lexington; US 60 in Lexington; US 25 / US 421 in Lexington; I-64 / I-75 in Lexington; US 62 in Cynthiana; AA Hwy (KY 9) in Cold Spring; I-471 in Highland Heights; I-471 in Fort Thomas
- North end: US 27 at Ohio state line in Covington

Location
- Country: United States
- State: Kentucky
- Counties: McCreary, Pulaski, Lincoln, Garrard, Jessamine, Fayette, Bourbon, Harrison, Pendleton, Campbell

Highway system
- United States Numbered Highway System; List; Special; Divided; Kentucky State Highway System; Interstate; US; State; Parkways
← KY 26	→ KY 28

U.S. Route 27 (US 27) in Kentucky runs 201.120 miles (323.671 km) from the Tennessee border to the Ohio border at Cincinnati. It crosses into the state in the Lake Cumberland area, passing near or through many small towns, including Somerset, Stanford, and Nicholasville. The road then passes straight through the heart of Lexington, including past the University of Kentucky (UK) and Transylvania University. North of Lexington, it passes through Cynthiana and Falmouth before entering Campbell County and passing through many Northern Kentucky suburbs before ending at the Ohio state line on the Taylor–Southgate Bridge in Cincinnati.

== Route description ==
US 27 crosses into Kentucky entering the Daniel Boone National Forest in the Strunk community, just south of Pine Knot. Heading north, US 27 turns into a four-lane highway in Burnside. US 27 is the main highway running through Somerset. The route continues as a four-lane highway almost to the Pulaski–Lincoln county line and again has four lanes through Stanford. It veers northeast to Lancaster then northwest to the site of Camp Dick Robinson at Kentucky Route 34, becoming four lanes. Entering Jessamine County, the road crosses the Kentucky River. It westerly bypasses the central business district of Nicholasville. Once in Fayette County, US 27 turns into a six-lane highway passing many shopping destinations in Lexington. Passing The Summit at Fritz Farm, Fayette Mall, and Lexington Green, Nicholasville Road is one of the busiest roads in Lexington. The road becomes South Limestone Street upon reaching Cooper Drive. At UK's Albert B. Chandler Hospital, it turns west on four-lane Virginia Avenue, then joins US 68 (Broadway) for its northeasterly journey through Lexington's central business district and the horse-farm country of Fayette and Bourbon counties. The conjoined routes separate on the north side of Paris, where US 27 splits from the town bypass and heads north to Cynthiana, Falmouth, and Newport. It then crosses the Ohio River into Cincinnati.

== Major intersections ==
County	Location	mi	km	Destinations	Notes
McCreary		0.000	0.000	US 27 south	Continuation into Tennessee
McCreary	Strunk	1.868	3.006	KY 1470 west (Ross Road)	Southern end of KY 1470 overlap
McCreary	Silerville	2.315	3.726	KY 1470 east (Marsh Creek Road)	Northern end of KY 1470 overlap
McCreary	Pine Knot	4.288	6.901	KY 92 east to I-75	Southern end of KY 92 overlap
McCreary	Pine Knot	4.608	7.416	KY 2792 east / KY 1651 north	Western terminus of KY 2792; southern terminus of KY 1651
McCreary	Pine Knot	6.991	11.251	KY 1567 south (Appletree Road)	Northern terminus of KY 1567
McCreary	Stearns	7.759	12.487	KY 92 west	Northern end of KY 92 overlap
McCreary	Whitley City	9.093	14.634	KY 478 (Williamsburg Street)	
McCreary	Marshes Siding	10.794	17.371	KY 700	
McCreary		12.299	19.793	KY 1651 south	Northern terminus of KY 1651
McCreary		15.051	24.222	KY 1045 east (Beulah Heights Road)	Western terminus of KY 1045
McCreary		16.877	27.161	KY 927 (The Day Ridge Road)	
McCreary	Parkers Lake	17.380	27.970	KY 90 east (Cumberland Falls Road) to I-75	Southern end of KY 90 overlap
McCreary	Greenwood	20.068	32.296	KY 2282	
Pulaski		27.386	44.073	KY 751 south (Keno Road)	Northern terminus of KY 751
Pulaski		28.169	45.334	KY 804 west (Garland Road)	Eastern terminus of KY 804
Pulaski	Burnside	30.388	48.905	KY 2295 north (West Lakeshore Drive)	Southern terminus of western branch of KY 2295
Pulaski	Burnside	30.657	49.338	KY 2295 north (East Lakeshore Drive)	Southern terminus of eastern branch of KY 2295
Pulaski	Burnside	31.017	49.917	KY 2294 north (East French Street/West French Street)	
Pulaski	Burnside	31.406	50.543	KY 2295 Conn. (KY 2295C) to KY 2295	Connector road to KY 2295
Pulaski	Burnside	31.453– 31.719	50.619– 51.047	Bridge over the Cumberland River	
Pulaski	Burnside	31.974	51.457	KY 1247 east / KY 90 west – Monticello, Woodson Bend Resort	Interchange; Northern end of KY 90 overlap
Pulaski		33.534	53.968	KY 2301 west	Eastern terminus of KY 2301
Pulaski		34.447	55.437	KY 914 (Southeastern Bypass)	
Pulaski	Somerset	34.612	55.703	KY 1642 west (Slate Branch Road)	Southern end of KY 1642 overlap
Pulaski	Somerset	35.114	56.511	KY 1642 east (Parkers Mill Road)	Northern end of KY 1642 overlap
Pulaski	Somerset	35.979	57.903	KY 2292 north (Monticello Street) – Bourbon, Lake Cumberland Regional Airport	Southern terminus of KY 2292
Pulaski	Somerset	36.578	58.867	KY 2297 east (UK Drive)	Western terminus of KY 2297
Pulaski	Somerset	37.476	60.312	KY 2299 Conn. east to KY 2299	Connector road to KY 2299
Pulaski	Somerset	37.587	60.490	KY 2299 south	Northern terminus of KY 2299; only accessible from US 27 north
Pulaski	Somerset	37.712	60.692	KY 1577 (Oak Hill Road)	
Pulaski	Somerset	38.407	61.810	KY 2298 south (Langdon Street) – Lake Cumberland Regional Hospital	Northern terminus of KY 2298
Pulaski	Somerset	39.034	62.819	KY 80 Bus. (Ogden Street/Bobtown Road) – Russell Springs, Pulaski County Park, Mill Springs Battlefield NHL	KY 80 Bus. only signed eastbound for northbound traffic; no left turn from south US 27 to east KY 80 Bus.
Pulaski	Somerset	39.106	62.935	KY 80 / Hal Rogers Parkway to I-75 / Cumberland Expressway	Western terminus of Hal Rogers Parkway
Pulaski	Somerset	39.749	63.970	KY 2227 north (Old US Highway 27) / KY 3091 north (Clifty Road) – North 27 Antique Mall	Southern terminus of KY 2227; southern terminus of KY 3091
Pulaski		41.583	66.921	Cumberland Expressway west – Bowling Green	Exit 88 from Cumberland Parkway; eastern terminus of Cumberland Parkway
Pulaski		41.754	67.197	KY 1674 south	Northern terminus of KY 1674
Pulaski	Norwood	43.135	69.419	KY 1247	
Pulaski	Science Hill	44.894	72.250	KY 635 (Main Street)	
Pulaski		48.062	77.348	KY 452	
Pulaski		48.802	78.539	KY 1247	
Pulaski		50.291	80.936	KY 1247	
Pulaski	Eubank	52.079	83.813	KY 70 – Eubank	
Lincoln		54.169	87.177	KY 1247 south (Old Somerset Road)	Southern end of KY 1247 overlap
Lincoln		54.331	87.437	KY 1247 north (Old Somerset Road)	Northern end of KY 1247 overlap
Lincoln		54.538	87.770	KY 1247 south (Old Somerset Road)	Southern end of KY 1247 overlap
Lincoln		54.779	88.158	KY 1247 north (Old Somerset Road)	Northern end of KY 1247 overlap
Lincoln		55.752	89.724	KY 328 east / KY 3276 west (Old Waynesburg Road) to KY 1247	Southern end of KY 328 overlap
Lincoln		55.930	90.011	KY 1247 south	Southern end of KY 1247 overlap
Lincoln		56.248	90.522	KY 328 west / KY 1247 north – Waynesburg	Northern end of KY 328 and KY 1247 overlaps
Lincoln		58.771	94.583	KY 1781 (Greenbriar Road)	
Lincoln		60.341	97.109	KY 501 west (King's Mountain Road)	
Lincoln		61.166	98.437	KY 1247 (Old Somerset Road)	
Lincoln		61.939	99.681	KY 1247 south (Old Somerset Road)	Southern end of KY 1247 overlap
Lincoln		62.002	99.783	KY 1247 north (Old Somerset Road)	Northern end of KY 1247 overlap
Lincoln		63.962	102.937	KY 1247 south (Old Somerset Road)	Southern end of KY 1247 overlap
Lincoln		64.290	103.465	KY 1247 north (Old Somerset Road)	Northern end of KY 1247 overlap
Lincoln		64.907	104.458	KY 1247 south (Old Somerset Road)	Southern end of KY 1247 overlap
Lincoln		64.941	104.512	KY 643 east / KY 1247 north	Northern end of KY 1247 overlap
Lincoln		65.299	105.089	KY 3249 west (Skyline Drive)	Eastern terminus of KY 3249
Lincoln		68.689	110.544	KY 698 south (Mason Gap Road)	Northern terminus of KY 698
Lincoln		68.816	110.749	KY 1247 south (Old Somerset Road North)	Southern end of KY 1247 overlap
Lincoln	Stanford	69.512	111.869	KY 1247 north (Somerset Street)	Northern end of KY 1247 overlap
Lincoln	Stanford	70.354	113.224	KY 78 (Main Street) – Hustonville, Stanford Business District	
Lincoln	Stanford	70.848	114.019	KY 1247 south (Somerset Street)	Northern terminus of KY 1247
Lincoln	Stanford	71.113	114.445	US 150 to US 127	
Lincoln	Stanford	71.276	114.708	KY 590 north	
Garrard	Lancaster	77.308	124.415	KY 39 south (Industrial Road)	Southern end of KY 39 overlap
Garrard	Lancaster	78.136	125.748	KY 52 to I-75 – Richmond, Danville	
Garrard	Lancaster	78.165	125.794	Public Square	
Garrard	Lancaster	78.233	125.904	KY 39 north (East Maple Avenue)	
Garrard		79.448	127.859	KY 1355 west (Sugar Creek Road)	Eastern terminus of KY 1355
Garrard	Davistown	85.480	137.567	KY 34 (Chenault Bridge Road)	
Garrard	Bryantsville	86.765	139.635	KY 753 north (Sutton Lane)	Southern terminus of KY 753
Garrard		86.993	140.002	KY 1355 east (Mt. Hebron Road)	Western terminus of KY 1355
Garrard		88.928	143.116	KY 152 west	Eastern terminus of KY 152
Garrard		90.509	145.660	KY 1845 north (Rogers Road)	Southern terminus of KY 1845
Kentucky River		91.659– 91.866	147.511– 147.844	Bridge over the Kentucky River	
Jessamine		95.163	153.150	KY 1268 south (Sugar Creek Pike)	Southern end of KY 1268 overlap
Jessamine		95.620	153.885	KY 1268 north (Bethel Road)	Northern end of KY 1268 overlap
Jessamine	Nicholasville	97.113	156.288	KY 3374 east (Hoover Pike)	Western terminus of KY 3374
Jessamine	Nicholasville	97.353	156.674	KY 2827 east to KY 29	
Jessamine	Nicholasville	97.805	157.402	US 27 Bus. north (South Main Street)	Southern end of Nicholasville US 27 Bus.
Jessamine	Nicholasville	99.847	160.688	KY 29 to US 68 – Wilmore, Nicholasville	Interchange
Jessamine	Nicholasville	101.554	163.435	KY 169 (Keene Road)	St. Joseph Jessamine Hospital just south of intersection
Jessamine	Nicholasville	102.621	165.152	US 27 Bus. south – Nicholasville	Northern terminus of Nicholasville US 27 Bus.
Jessamine	Nicholasville	104.602	168.341	KY 3375 west (Catnip Hill Road)	Eastern terminus of KY 3375
Jessamine	Nicholasville	106.239	170.975	KY 1980 east (Ash Grove Pike)	Southern end of KY 1980 overlap
Jessamine	Nicholasville	106.601	171.558	KY 1980 west (Brannon Road)	Northern end of KY 1980 overlap
Fayette	Lexington	107.117	172.388	Man o' War Boulevard	
Fayette	Lexington	109.395– 109.589	176.054– 176.366	KY 4 (New Circle Road)	Exit 19 from KY 4
Fayette	Lexington	112.725	181.413	US 68 west (South Broadway Street)	Southern end of US 68 overlap
Fayette	Lexington	113.279	182.305	KY 922 (Oliver Lewis Way)	Southern end of US 68 overlap
Fayette	Lexington	113.749	183.061	US 25 south / US 60 east / US 421 south (West Vine Street)	One-way east
Fayette	Lexington	113.810	183.159	US 25 north / US 60 west / US 421 north (West Main Street) – Mary Todd Lincoln House	One-way west
Fayette	Lexington	115.761	186.299	KY 4 (West New Circle Road)	
Fayette	Lexington	116.820– 116.951	188.004– 188.214	I-75 north / I-64 east – Knoxville, Ashland, Cincinnati, Louisville	Exit 113 off I-75/I-64 and ramp to 75S/64E
Fayette	Lexington	119.341	192.061	KY 3367 east (Johnston Road)	Western terminus of KY 3367
Fayette	Lexington	120.061	193.219	KY 1973 west (Iron Works Pike)	Southern end of KY 1973 overlap
Fayette	Lexington	121.574	195.654	KY 1973 east (Muir Station Road)	Northern end of KY 1973 overlap
Bourbon	Hutchison	124.201	199.882	KY 1939 north (Hutchison Road)	Southern terminus of KY 1939
Bourbon	Paris	129.685	208.708	KY 1939 (Hume Bedford Pike/Bethlehem Road)	
Bourbon	Paris	129.845	208.965	US 68 Bus. east (Main Street)	Southern terminus of US 68 Bus.
Bourbon	Paris	131.393	211.457	US 460 (Georgetown Road/West 8th Street) – Georgetown, Paris	
Bourbon	Paris	131.811	212.129	US 68 east (Martin Luther King Boulevard) / US 27 north (Cynthiana Road) – Maysville, Cynthiana	Northern end of US 68 overlap
Bourbon	Ewalt Crossroads	135.664	218.330	KY 1876 south (Clay Kiser Road)	Northern terminus of KY 1876
Bourbon		137.981	222.059	KY 1893 east (Mt. Carmel Road)	Western terminus of KY 1893
Harrison	Lair	140.845	226.668	KY 982 west (Edgewater Pike)	Southern end of KY 982 overlap
Harrison		141.158	227.172	KY 982 east – Cynthiana-Harrison County Airport	
Harrison	Cynthiana	142.649	229.571	US 27 Bus. north / US 62 west – Cynthiana, Georgetown	Traffic circle; southern end of US 62 overlap
Harrison	Cynthiana	143.260	230.555	KY 32	
Harrison	Cynthiana	144.508	232.563	KY 356	
Harrison	Cynthiana	145.180	233.645	US 27 Conn. east to KY 36	Signed as US 27C; short connector road between US 27 and KY 36
Harrison	Cynthiana	146.207	235.297	US 27 Bus. south / US 62 east	Northern end of US 27 Bus.; northern end of US 62 overlap
Harrison		154.851	249.209	KY 1032 west – Berry	Eastern terminus of KY 1032
Harrison		156.281	251.510	KY 1284 east (Sunrise-Richland Road) – Sunrise	Western terminus of KY 1284
Harrison		157.287	253.129	KY 1744 south	Northern terminus of KY 1744
Pendleton		159.869	257.284	KY 1053 north (Rankin Mill Road)	Southern terminus of KY 1053
Pendleton		164.447	264.652	KY 1053 south (Bradford Road)	Northern terminus of KY 1053
Pendleton	Falmouth	165.916	267.016	KY 22 east (Main Street) – Kincaid Lake State Park, Kincaid Regional Theater	Southern end of KY 22 overlap
Pendleton		167.350	269.324	KY 330 west	Eastern terminus of KY 330
Pendleton		169.302	272.465	KY 22 west – Williamstown	Northern end of KY 22 overlap
Pendleton		169.683	273.078	KY 1657 west (Lightfoot Fork Road)	Eastern terminus of KY 1657
Pendleton		170.824	274.915	KY 17 north – Animal Shelter, Bethel Cemetery and Church	Southern terminus of KY 17
Pendleton		176.167	283.513	KY 177 north – Butler	Southern terminus of KY 177
Pendleton		176.463	283.990	KY 3162 east	Western terminus of KY 3162
Pendleton		177.310	285.353	KY 3149 south	Northern terminus of KY 3149
Campbell		180.832	291.021	KY 154 east (Peach Grove Road)	Western terminus of KY 154
Campbell	Grant's Lick	181.739	292.481	KY 1936 north (Kenton Station Road)	Southern terminus of KY 1936
Campbell		183.429	295.200	KY 824 east (Race Track Road)	Western terminus of KY 824
Campbell	Claryville	185.865	299.121	KY 915 north (Camel Crossing)	Southern terminus of KY 915
Campbell	Claryville	187.200	301.269	KY 536 west (Creektrace Road)	Eastern terminus of KY 536
Campbell	Alexandria	188.403	303.205	KY 10 (West Main Street/East Main Street) – Alexandria City Building	
Campbell	Alexandria	188.703	303.688	KY 2924 east (Tollgate Road)	Western terminus of KY 2924
Campbell	Alexandria	190.222	306.133	KY 709 north (East Alexandria Pike)	Southern terminus of KY 709
Campbell	Cold Spring	191.977– 192.197	308.957– 309.311	AA Hwy (KY 9) to I-275 – Maysville, Wilder	Exit 14 from KY 9/AA Hwy.
Campbell	Cold Spring	194.119	312.404	KY 1998 south (Pooles Creek Road) / KY 8 east (Industrial Road)	Northern terminus of KY-1998. Southern end of KY-8 concurrency. Prior to 2018, KY-1998 continued north along Industrial Road.
Campbell	Cold Spring	194.506	313.027	KY 2345 north (ML Collins Boulevard)	Southern terminus of KY 2345
Campbell	Cold Spring	194.689	313.322	KY 3490 west (Johns Hill Road)	Eastern terminus of KY 3490
Campbell	Highland Heights	194.984	313.796	KY 2298 west (Louie B Nunn Drive)	Eastern terminus of KY 2298
Campbell	Highland Heights	195.090	313.967	KY 471 north to I-471 north / I-275 – Airport, Newport, Cincinnati, Columbus, OH	Unsigned route connecting US 27 with I-471;
Campbell	Fort Thomas	196.919	316.910	KY 1120 west (South Fort Thomas Avenue)	Eastern terminus of KY 1120
Campbell	Fort Thomas	197.204	317.369	KY 445 south (Grandview Avenue)	Northern terminus of KY 445
Campbell	Fort Thomas	197.880– 198.022	318.457– 318.686	I-471 to I-275 – Cincinnati, Alexandria	Exit 2 from I-471
Campbell	Fort Thomas	198.108	318.824	KY 1632 west (Moock Road) – Wilder	Eastern terminus of KY 1632
Campbell	Newport	199.565	321.169	KY 1892 east (Carothers Road)	Western terminus of KY 1892
Campbell	Newport	199.927	321.751	KY 1120 (East 10th Street)	
Campbell	Newport	200.538	322.735	KY 8 Bus. (East 3rd Street)	Former Kentucky Route 8; western terminus of KY 8 business route
Campbell	Newport	200.626	322.876	KY 8 (Third Street) – Newport on the Levee	Northern end of KY 8 overlap
Ohio River		200.719– 201.120	323.026– 323.671	Taylor Southgate Bridge	
Campbell	Newport	201.120	323.671	US 27 north – Cincinnati	Continuation into Ohio
1.000 mi = 1.609 km; 1.000 km = 0.621 mi: Concurrency terminus; Incomplete access

U.S. Route 27
Previous state: Tennessee	Kentucky	Next state: Ohio
