= National Register of Historic Places listings in Lincoln County, Kentucky =

Location of Lincoln County in Kentucky

This is a list of the National Register of Historic Places listings in Lincoln County, Kentucky.

This is intended to be a complete list of the properties and districts on the National Register of Historic Places in Lincoln County, Kentucky, United States. The locations of National Register properties and districts for which the latitude and longitude coordinates are included below, may be seen in a map.

There are 22 properties and districts listed on the National Register in the county.

This National Park Service list is complete through NPS recent listings posted March 21, 2025.

== Current listings ==
	Name on the Register	Image	Date listed	Location	City or town	Description
1	James W. Alcorn House	James W. Alcorn House	April 22, 1980 (#80001649)	409 Danville Ave. 37°31′58″N 84°40′09″W	Stanford	
2	Arcadia		May 4, 1976 (#76000913)	South of Shelby City on U.S. Route 127; 37°33′37″N 84°47′21″W	Shelby City	
3	Baughman's Mill and Stanford Railroad Depot	Baughman's Mill and Stanford Railroad Depot	March 29, 1978 (#78001373)	Depot and Mill Sts. 37°31′49″N 84°39′50″W	Stanford	
4	John Baughman House		December 22, 1978 (#78001374)	South of Stanford on Kentucky Route 1247; 37°30′15″N 84°38′44″W	Stanford	
5	Samuel and Mary Logan Briggs House	Samuel and Mary Logan Briggs House	August 28, 1975 (#75000794)	315 W. Main St. 37°31′44″N 84°39′52″W	Stanford	
6	Confederate Monument at Crab Orchard	Confederate Monument at Crab Orchard	July 17, 1997 (#97000682)	Crab Orchard Cemetery, 0.5 miles east of the junction of Kentucky Routes 39 and 643; 37°27′52″N 84°30′10″W	Crab Orchard	
7	Helm-Engleman House		January 27, 1983 (#83002808)	North of Hubble on Engleman Lane; 37°36′55″N 84°39′46″W	Hubble	
8	Hoffman House		June 23, 1983 (#83002809)	U.S. Route 27; 37°34′47″N 84°36′25″W	Lancaster	
9	Nathan Huston House		June 23, 1983 (#83002810)	Kentucky Route 78; 37°28′22″N 84°49′23″W	Hustonville	
10	Lincoln County Courthouse	Lincoln County Courthouse	April 22, 1976 (#76000915)	Main and Lancaster Sts. 37°31′47″N 84°39′41″W	Stanford	
11	John Logan House	John Logan House	June 11, 1975 (#75000795)	East of Stanford at the junction of U.S. Route 150 and Goshen Rd. (Kentucky Route 642); 37°31′50″N 84°38′34″W	Stanford	
12	McCormack Church		March 16, 1976 (#76000916)	4 miles west of Stanford on Kentucky Route 1194; 37°31′38″N 84°44′37″W	Stanford	
13	Abraham Miller House		March 6, 2001 (#00001083)	3475 Kentucky Route 300; 37°33′34″N 84°44′27″W	Stanford	
14	Dr. Thomas Montgomery House	Dr. Thomas Montgomery House	November 17, 1978 (#78001375)	Somerset St. 37°31′18″N 84°39′44″W	Stanford	
15	Adam Pence House		December 22, 1978 (#78001376)	South of Stanford on Kentucky Route 1247; 37°28′06″N 84°38′01″W	Stanford	
16	Richland Farm		August 4, 2004 (#04000792)	5355 Kentucky Route 1194; 37°31′07″N 84°47′01″W	Stanford	
17	Stanford Commercial District	Stanford Commercial District	November 17, 1986 (#86003173)	Main St. from Somerset St. to 3rd St. 37°31′44″N 84°39′47″W	Stanford	
18	Swope-Dudderar House and Mill Site		April 16, 1979 (#79001020)	East of Stanford on Goshen Rd. 37°33′24″N 84°36′03″W	Stanford	
19	Traveler's Rest		May 3, 1976 (#76000914)	South of Shelby City off Kentucky Route 300; 37°33′51″N 84°47′02″W	Shelby City	
20	Walnut Meadows		December 22, 1978 (#78001377)	Southeast of Stanford on U.S. Route 150; 37°29′26″N 84°34′05″W	Stanford	
21	William Whitley House State Shrine	William Whitley House State Shrine	April 11, 1973 (#73000814)	2 miles west of Crab Orchard off U.S. Route 150; 37°28′05″N 84°33′00″W	Crab Orchard	
22	Horace Withers House	Horace Withers House	December 30, 1987 (#87002189)	Kentucky Route 590 (Hubble Rd.); 37°32′37″N 84°39′08″W	Stanford	

== See also ==
- List of National Historic Landmarks in Kentucky
- National Register of Historic Places listings in Kentucky
