= Ferguson, Kentucky =

- City
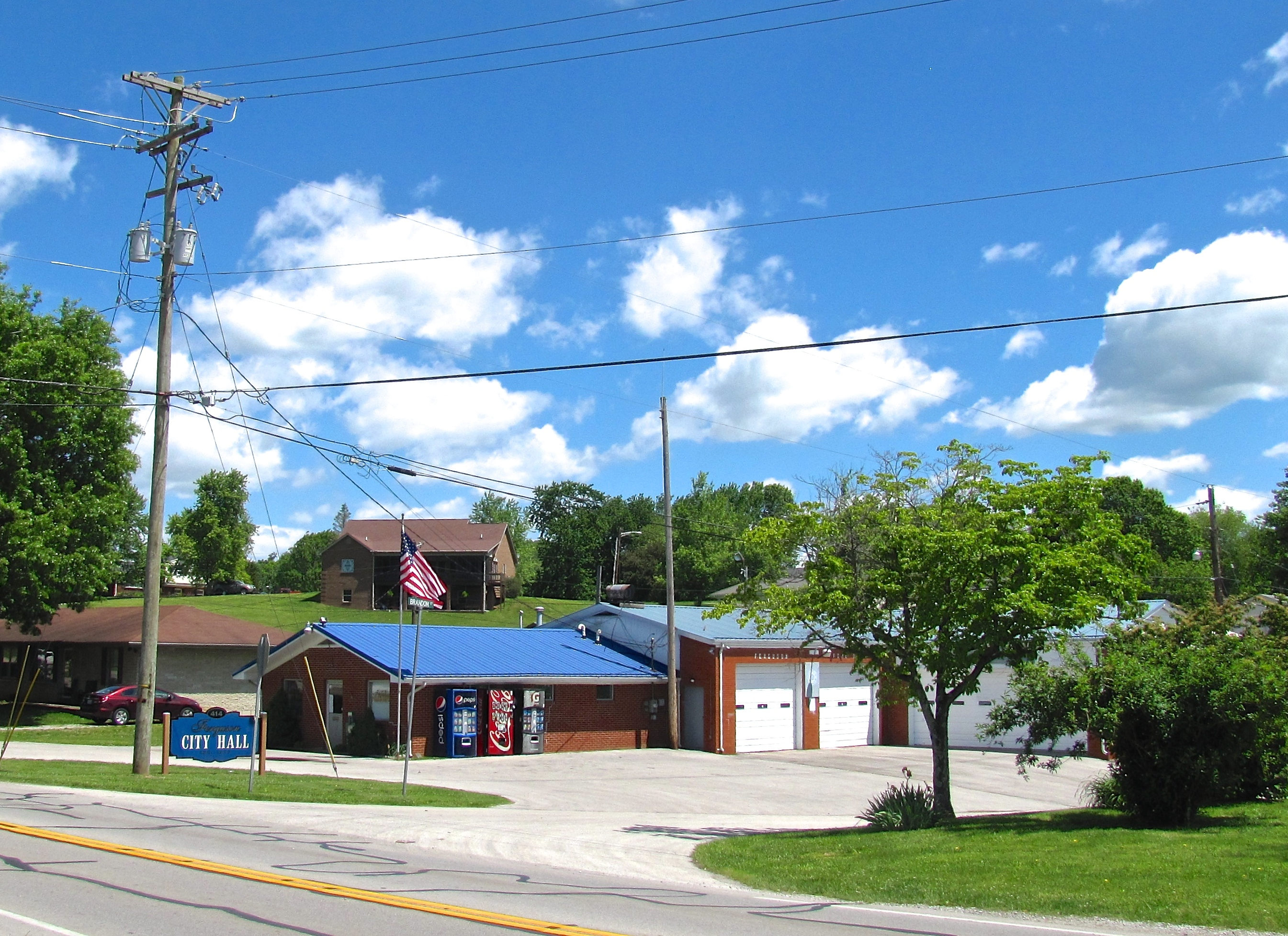
- Ferguson City Hall

- Location of Ferguson in Pulaski County, Kentucky.
- Coordinates: 37°03′47″N 84°35′14″W
- Country: United States
- State: Kentucky
- County: Pulaski

Area
  - Total: 2.01 sq mi (5.21 km^{2})
  - Land: 2.01 sq mi (5.21 km^{2})
  - Water: 0.0039 sq mi (0.01 km^{2})
- Elevation: 1,060 ft (320 m)

Population (2020)
  - Total: 886
  - Density: 440.7/sq mi (170.15/km^{2})
- Time zone: UTC-5 (Eastern (EST))
  - Summer (DST): UTC-4 (EDT)
- ZIP code: 42533
- Area code: 606
- FIPS code: 21-27010
- GNIS feature ID: 2403606
- Website: cityoffergusonky.gov

Ferguson is a home rule-class city just south of downtown Somerset in Pulaski County, Kentucky, United States. As of the 2020 census, Ferguson had a population of 886.

== History ==
The city was originally constructed just north of the Cincinnati Southern Railroad's engine repair shops as a residential community for its workers. It was incorporated by the state assembly in 1906. It was likely named for the Cincinnati attorney Edward A. Ferguson who helped found the railroad in 1869.

Because another community in Logan County already possessed a post office named Ferguson, the city long employed the name Luretha for mail delivery after the daughter of its first postmaster George Wynn. In 1950, the Logan Co. post office was closed and the Board on Geographic Names approved the use of Ferguson for the Pulaski community's mail.

The railroad shops were specialized for work with steam engines and were shuttered after trains began using diesel locomotives in the mid-20th century.

=== Ferguson School ===
Ferguson School opened in 1910 for grades 1–12 to serve the children of the town and the rural area just south and east. The high school fluctuated in enrollment from 100 to 150. The high school closed in 1968 and the elementary school in 1978. The property of the former school grounds is now the Ferguson Park, and the buildings house community center offices and recreational facilities. Ferguson students now attend Southwestern High School and Pulaski County High School.

== Geography ==
The city is concentrated along Kentucky Route 1247 (Murphy Avenue), and stretches southward toward Kentucky Route 914. Ferguson is surrounded on the north, west, and south by the municipal boundaries of Somerset. The Cumberland River (Lake Cumberland) passes to the southwest.

According to the United States Census Bureau, the city has a total area of 1.8 square miles (4.7 km^{2}), all land.

== Demographics ==
Historical population
Census	Pop.	Note	%±
1910	404		—
1920	529		30.9%
1930	532		0.6%
1940	517		−2.8%
1950	550		6.4%
1960	468		−14.9%
1970	507		8.3%
1980	1,009		99.0%
1990	934		−7.4%
2000	881		−5.7%
2010	924		4.9%
2020	886		−4.1%
U.S. Decennial Census

As of the census of 2000, there were 881 people, 360 households, and 249 families residing in the city. The population density was 504.6 inhabitants per square mile (194.8/km^{2}). There were 397 housing units at an average density of 227.4 per square mile (87.8/km^{2}). The racial makeup of the city was 97.62% White, 1.02% African American, 0.34% Native American, 0.45% Asian, and 0.57% from two or more races. Hispanic or Latino of any race were 0.23% of the population.

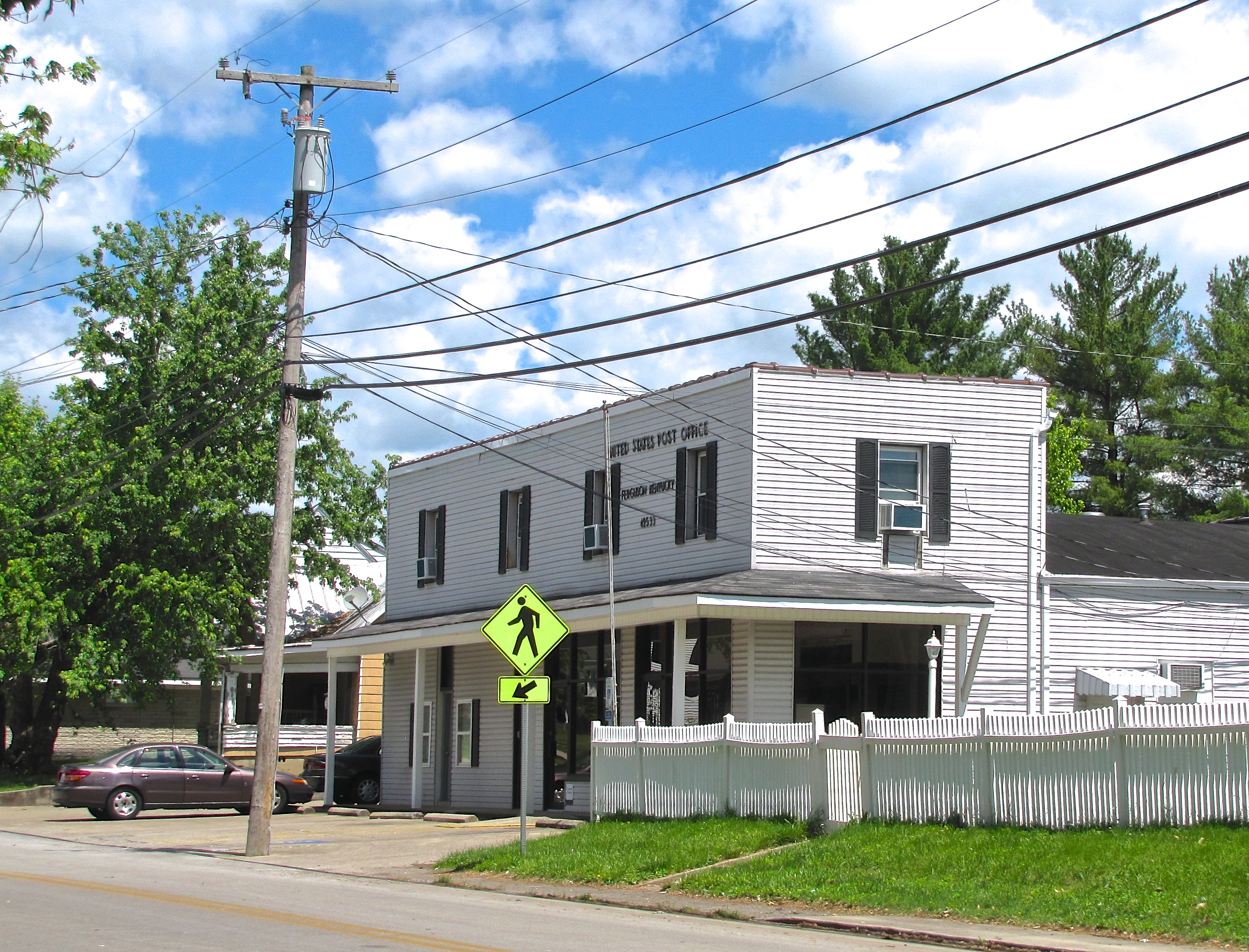
Ferguson Post Office

There were 360 households, out of which 27.8% had children under the age of 18 living with them, 56.4% were married couples living together, 10.0% had a female householder with no husband present, and 30.8% were non-families. 26.1% of all households were made up of individuals, and 11.7% had someone living alone who was 65 years of age or older. The average household size was 2.45 and the average family size was 2.92.

In the city, the population was spread out, with 22.9% under the age of 18, 10.8% from 18 to 24, 27.8% from 25 to 44, 24.9% from 45 to 64, and 13.6% who were 65 years of age or older. The median age was 38 years. For every 100 females, there were 105.8 males. For every 100 females age 18 and over, there were 94.0 males.

The median income for a household in the city was $30,855, and the median income for a family was $37,841. Males had a median income of $27,386 versus $17,308 for females. The per capita income for the city was $13,355. About 10.0% of families and 16.5% of the population were below the poverty line, including 22.4% of those under age 18 and 14.0% of those age 65 or over.

== Education ==
It is in the Pulaski County School District.
