= Kentucky Route 501 =

State highway in Kentucky

Kentucky Route 501
- KY 501 highlighted in red

Route information
- Maintained by KYTC
- Length: 23.067 mi (37.123 km)

Major junctions
- South end: KY 910 in Phil
- KY 70 near Yosemite
- North end: US 27 near Waynesburg

Location
- Country: United States
- State: Kentucky
- Counties: Casey, Lincoln

Highway system
- Kentucky State Highway System; Interstate; US; State; Parkways
← KY 500	→ KY 502

Kentucky Route 501 (KY 501) is a 23.067-mile-long (37.123 km) state highway in Kentucky. KY 501's southern terminus is at KY 910 in Phil, and the northern terminus is at U.S. Route 27 (US 27) north-northeast of Waynesburg.

== Major intersections ==
County	Location	mi	km	Destinations	Notes
Casey	Phil	0.000	0.000	KY 910	Southern terminus
Casey		8.835	14.219	KY 1649	
Casey		11.180	17.992	KY 70 east	Southern end of KY 70 concurrency
Casey		11.853	19.076	KY 70 west	Northern end of KY 70 concurrency
Casey		16.288	26.213	KY 3270	
Casey		17.598	28.321	KY 837	
Lincoln	Kings Mountain	20.369	32.781	KY 3539 north	Southern terminus of KY 3539
Lincoln	Kings Mountain	20.633	33.206	KY 3539 south	Northern terminus of KY 3539
Lincoln		21.557	34.693	KY 1778 north	Southern terminus of KY 1778
Lincoln		22.963	36.955	KY 1247	
Lincoln		23.067	37.123	US 27	Northern Terminus
1.000 mi = 1.609 km; 1.000 km = 0.621 mi: Concurrency terminus
