= WXKY =

K-Love radio station in Stanford, Kentucky

- Stanford, Kentucky; United States
- Broadcast area: Danville and South Central Kentucky
- Frequency: 96.3 MHz
- Branding: K-Love

Programming
- Format: Contemporary Christian
- Network: K-Love

Ownership
- Owner: Educational Media Foundation

History
- First air date: May 26, 1967
- Former call signs: WRSL-FM (1967–2001); WXKY-FM (2001–2017)
- Former frequencies: 95.9 MHz (1967–1995)

Technical information
- Licensing authority: FCC
- Facility ID: 37560
- Class: C3
- ERP: 4,900 watts
- HAAT: 223 meters (732 ft)
- Transmitter coordinates: 37°31′20.9″N 84°52′12.6″W

Links
- Public license information: Public file; LMS
- Webcast: Listen Live
- Website: klove.com

WXKY (96.3 FM) is a radio station licensed to Stanford, Kentucky, which serves as an affiliate of the national K-LOVE Contemporary Christian radio network owned by the Educational Media Foundation. The station's transmitter is located in the far northeast corner of Casey County, west of Stanford and near Hustonville on Sand Knob Road.

Prior to being leased out, and later sold, to EMF, WXKY was a Stanford-based country music station as WRSL-FM, an adjunct to WRSL (1520 AM).

== History ==
=== WRSL-FM ===
When WRSL-FM began operating on May 26, 1967, it was the first FM radio station in service between Lexington and Somerset. The establishment of the FM outlet allowed WRSL, a daytime-only radio station, to begin covering high school sporting events that took place after sunset. The launch of WRSL-FM, which began at 95.9 MHz, saw the formation of a simulcast with the AM station, with both stations broadcasting a country format; WRSL-FM would be one of the longest-running FM country outlets in central Kentucky. The station broadcast from WRSL's existing studios on US 27 north of town, with the FM transmitter being placed on the AM tower.

WRSL-FM signed on amidst a multi-year shift in ownership of the Lincoln-Garrard Broadcasting Company, which owned the AM and FM outlets. In 1965, before the company had applied for an FM station, W. G. Morgan, on whose own farmland the station facilities sat, sold his share to Calvin C. Smith; Smith became the full owner in 1969 by buying out Lanier Burchette.

The Gaskin family ran WRSL-AM-FM from 1976 to 1982, when health reasons forced Jim Gaskin to relinquish operations; owner Cal Smith then split the two stations' programming and operated WRSL-AM-FM until his death at the age of 55 from pancreatic cancer in 1987. His wife, Ruth, ran the station until she retired in 1994 and sold it to their son, John Smith.

Smith's time owning WRSL-FM was one of major change for the station. On June 30, 1995, WRSL-FM moved from 95.9 to 96.3 MHz, increased its power to 25,000 watts from 3,000, and activated its new transmitter on Sand Knob Road. The upgrade substantially increased its coverage area in central Kentucky, though no format changes were planned. The Sand Knob Road transmitter site was vandalized that December by two teenagers who stole equipment that formed WRSL-FM's studio-transmitter link.

=== WXKY ===
WRSL-FM became WXKY-FM, branded as "Kentucky's Maximum Country", on July 23, 2001, in a bid to play up its regional broadcast area. However, the station would not remain country for long. In January 2002, after being initially approached the year before, owner John Smith opted to lease the station to the Educational Media Foundation, which resulted in the Air 1 network being heard in central Kentucky for the first time; Smith noted that he thought his father, Cal, would have appreciated EMF's ministry, and that he hoped the change would further reinforce perceptions of WXKY-FM as a regional, not a Stanford, station. WXKY was sold in 2004 to EMF itself for $800,000, allowing it to operate noncommercially, and thus completely as a satellite.

WXKY was off the air for two weeks and thereafter forced to operate for a time with reduced power after sustaining extensive fire damage in 2008.
