= Logan House =

Logan House may refer to:

in the United States (by state then city)

- Logan House (Wilmington, Delaware), listed on the National Register of Historic Places (NRHP)
- Thomas E. Logan House, Boise, Idaho, listed on the NRHP in Ada County
- W. W. Logan House, Bedford, Kentucky, listed on the NRHP in Lincoln County
- Logan House (Finchville, Kentucky), listed on the NRHP in Shelby County
- John Logan House, Stanford, Kentucky, listed on the NRHP in Lincoln County
- Logan House (403 E. Fourth Street, Carthage, Missouri), nominated for listing in the NRHP in Jasper County
- Logan House (509 E. Chestnut, Carthage, Missouri), nominated for listing on the NRHP in Jasper County
- Logan, John Sublett Jr. and Caroline Ashton House, Saint Joseph, Missouri, listed on the NRHP in Buchanan County
- The Logan, Omaha, Nebraska, listed on the NRHP in Douglas County
- George W. Logan House, Rutherfordton, North Carolina, listed on the NRHP in Rutherford County
- Leonard M. Logan House, Tahlequah, Oklahoma, listed on the NRHP in Cherokee County
- Logan House Hotel, Altoona, Pennsylvania, an historic hotel and site of the Loyal War Governors Conference.
- Logan House (Dillsburg, Pennsylvania)
- Ratcliffe-Logan-Allison House, Fairfax, Virginia, listed on the NRHP
