= Kentucky Route 635 =

State highway in Kentucky, United States

Kentucky Route 635
- KY 635 highlighted in red

Route information
- Maintained by KYTC
- Length: 13.566 mi (21.832 km)

Major junctions
- West end: KY 70 near Bethelridge
- US 27 in Science Hill
- East end: KY 39 near Dabney

Location
- Country: United States
- State: Kentucky
- Counties: Pulaski

Highway system
- Kentucky State Highway System; Interstate; US; State; Parkways
← KY 634	→ KY 636

Kentucky Route 635 (KY 635) is a 13.566-mile-long (21.832 km) state highway in Pulaski County, Kentucky, that runs from Kentucky Route 70 east of Bethelridge to Kentucky Route 39 southwest of Dabney via Science Hill.

== Major intersections ==
The entire route is in Pulaski County.

Location	mi	km	Destinations	Notes
	0.000	0.000	KY 70	Western terminus
	6.625	10.662	KY 1676 west	Eastern terminus of KY 1676
Science Hill	7.371	11.862	Stanford Street (KY 2308 east) / First Street	Western terminus of KY 2308
Science Hill	7.531	12.120	Stanford Street (KY 2309 south)	Northern terminus of KY 2309
Science Hill	7.673	12.348	KY 1247	
Science Hill	8.201	13.198	US 27	
	12.100	19.473	KY 3266 north (Old Stilesville Road)	Southern terminus of KY 3266
	13.566	21.832	KY 39	Eastern terminus
1.000 mi = 1.609 km; 1.000 km = 0.621 mi
