= Wilburn K. Ross =

United States Army Medal of Honor recipient

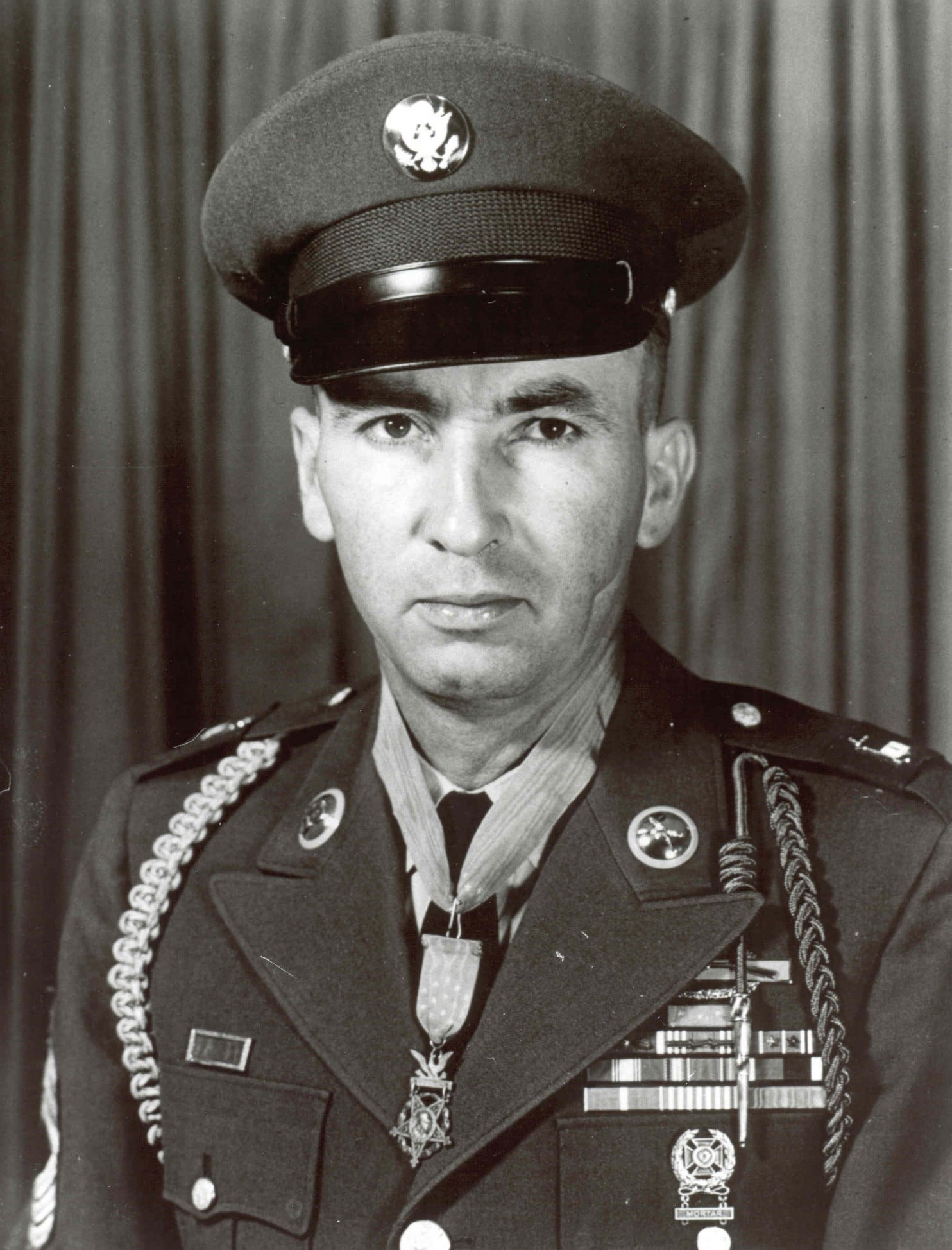
- Wilburn Ross in 1964
- Born: Wilburn Kirby Ross; May 12, 1922; Strunk, Kentucky
- Died: May 9, 2017 (aged 94); Tacoma, Washington
- Burial place: Tahoma National Cemetery, Kent, Washington
- Military career
- Allegiance: United States of America
- Branch: United States Army
- Service years: 1942-1964
- Rank: Master Sergeant
- Units: 2nd Battalion, 30th Infantry Regiment, 3rd Infantry Division
- Conflicts: World War II Korean War
- Awards: Medal of Honor Bronze Star

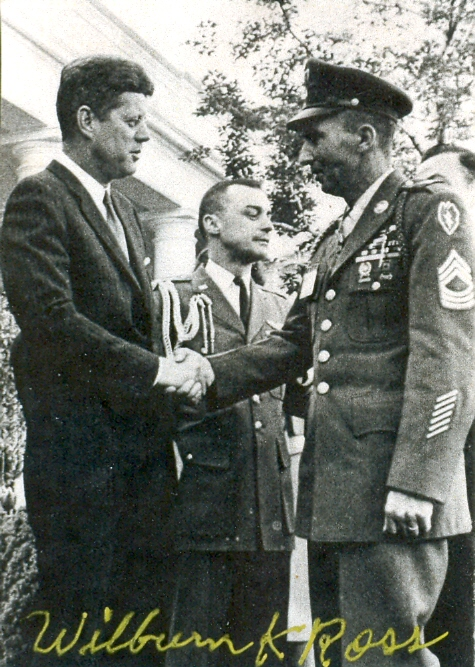
Wilburn K. Ross (right) being congratulated by President John F. Kennedy in 1963

Wilburn Kirby Ross (May 12, 1922 – May 9, 2017) was a United States Army soldier and a recipient of the United States military's highest decoration—the Medal of Honor—for his actions in World War II.

== Early life ==
Ross was born in Strunk, Kentucky. As a boy he would practice his marksmanship by placing a match in the crook of a tree and lighting it from a distance with a round from his .22 caliber rifle.

== Military career ==
He started working in coal mines at age 18, but he soon joined the United States Army. By October 30, 1944, he was serving as a private in Company G, 30th Infantry Regiment, 3rd Infantry Division. On that day, near Saint-Jacques, France, Ross manned a machine gun through repeated German assaults, holding off the enemy even after his supporting riflemen had run out of ammunition. During the incident, Ross noticed what he thought was the body of a deceased German soldier. This individual was in fact alive, and an American Lieutenant, who was watching Ross the entire time. This lieutenant later reported Ross' acts of valor and recommended him for the Medal of Honor which was issued six months later, on April 14, 1945.

Following World War II, he re-enlisted after a short period working a government job. Deployed to fight in Korea he was injured after nine days in combat. Remaining in the Army until 1964, Ross retired as a master sergeant.

== Personal life ==
For a two-year period before 1950, Ross worked for the Kentucky Highway Authority. Ross married in 1960, and after retiring from the U.S. Army, lived in DuPont, Washington. He and his wife raised six children. After retiring from the Army he worked for a veterans hospital as well as a pickle factory in Washington. His wife, Monica, died in 2011.

== Death ==
Ross died in Tacoma, on May 9, 2017, three days before his 95th birthday.

== Medal of Honor citation ==
Private Ross' official Medal of Honor citation reads:

For The President of the United States of America, in the name of Congress, takes pleasure in presenting the Medal of Honor to Private Wilburn Kirby Ross, United States Army, for conspicuous gallantry and intrepidity at risk of life above and beyond the call of duty while serving with Company G, 2d Battalion, 30th Infantry, 3d Infantry Division, in action near St. Jacques, France. At 11:30 a.m. on 30 October 1944, after his company had lost 55 out of 88 men in an attack on an entrenched, full-strength German company of elite mountain troops, Private Ross placed his light machinegun ten yards in advance of the foremost supporting riflemen in order to absorb the initial impact of an enemy counterattack. With machinegun and small-arms fire striking the earth near him, he fired with deadly effect on the assaulting force and repelled it. Despite the hail of automatic fire and the explosion of rifle grenades within a stone’s throw of his position, he continued to man his machine gun alone, holding off six more German attacks. When the eighth assault was launched, most of his supporting riflemen were out of ammunition. They took positions in echelon behind Private Ross and crawled up, during the attack, to extract a few rounds of ammunition from his machinegun ammunition belt. Private Ross fought on virtually without assistance and, despite the fact that enemy grenadiers crawled to within four yards of his position in an effort to kill him with hand grenades, he again directed accurate and deadly fire on the hostile force and hurled it back. After expending his last rounds, Private Ross was advised to withdraw to the company command post, together with eight surviving riflemen, but, as more ammunition was expected, he declined to do so. The Germans launched their last all-out attack, converging their fire on Private Ross in a desperate attempt to destroy the machinegun which stood between them and a decisive breakthrough. As his supporting riflemen fixed bayonets for a last-ditch stand, fresh ammunition arrived and was brought to Private Ross just as the advance assault elements were about to swarm over his position. He opened murderous fire on the oncoming enemy; killed 40 and wounded ten of the attacking force; broke the assault single-handedly, and forced the Germans to withdraw. Having killed or wounded at least 58 Germans in more than five hours of continuous combat and saved the remnants of his company from destruction, Private Ross remained at his post that night and the following day for a total of 36 hours. His actions throughout this engagement were an inspiration to his comrades and maintained the high traditions of the military service.

== Awards and Decorations ==

Badge	Combat Infantryman Badge with Star denoting 2nd award		
1st row	Medal of Honor	Bronze Star Medal Retroactively Awarded, 1947	Purple Heart with 2 Oak leaf clusters
2nd row	Army Good Conduct Medal with 2 Good Conduct Loops	American Campaign Medal	European–African–Middle Eastern Campaign Medal with 6 Campaign stars
3rd row	World War II Victory Medal	Army of Occupation Medal	National Defense Service Medal with 1 Oak leaf cluster
4th row	Korean Service Medal	United Nations Service Medal Korea	Korean War Service Medal Retroactively Awarded, 2004
Unit awards	Presidential Unit Citation		Korean Presidential Unit Citation

=== Patches ===
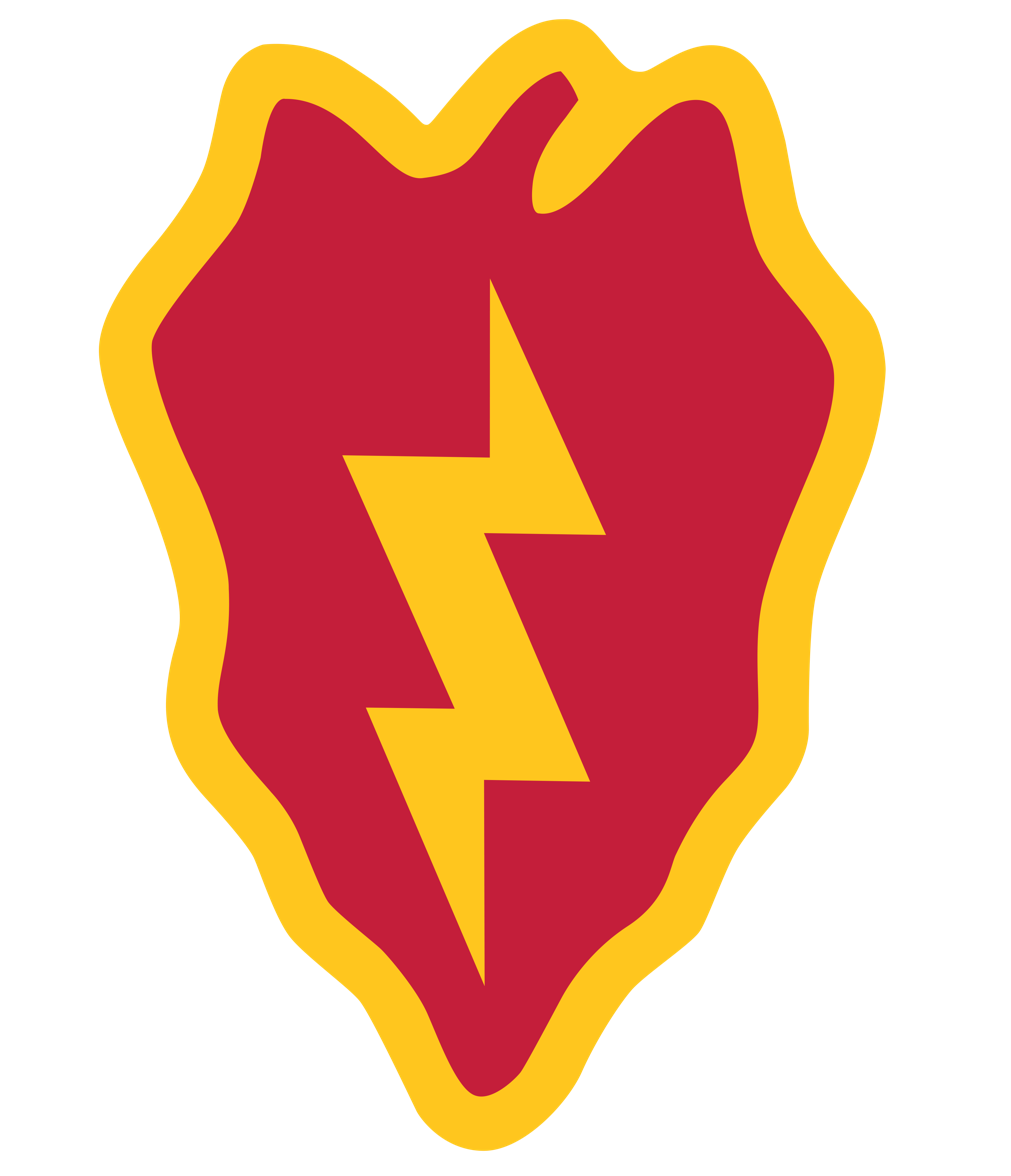

3rd Infantry Division Insignia	25th Infantry Division Insignia

== Honors ==
In 1978, the section of Route 27 running through McCreary County, Kentucky was named for Ross.

On September 18, 2013, he was honored in the first session of the 113th Congress.

On Veteran's Day, November 11, 2013, the U.S. Postal Service dedicated a set of World War II Medal of Honor Forever stamps. The cover set featured pictures of 12 Medal of Honor recipients, including Ross.

Ross was inducted into the Kentucky Veterans Hall of Fame in 2014, its inaugural class.

The town of DuPont named a community park after him and erected a memorial. The memorial inscription includes Ross's official Medal of Honor citation.

== See also ==
- List of Medal of Honor recipients for World War II
