= WRSL =

Radio station in Stanford and Corbin, Kentucky (1961–2017)

- Corbin, Kentucky; United States
- Frequency: 1600 kHz

Programming
- Format: Southern Gospel

Ownership
- Owner: Lincoln-Garrard Broadcasting Co., Inc.

History
- First air date: November 1, 1961
- Last air date: 2017
- Former call signs: WRSL (1962–2008); WKFO (2008–2011)
- Former frequencies: 1520 kHz (1961–2004)

Technical information
- Facility ID: 37559
- Class: D
- Power: 2,000 watts day; 27 watts night
- Transmitter coordinates: 37°01′06″N 84°05′58″W

WRSL (1600 AM) was a radio station licensed to Corbin, Kentucky, United States, broadcasting a Southern gospel format. The station was owned by Lincoln-Garrard Broadcasting Co., Inc., and broadcast from 1961 to 2017. The station moved to Corbin in 2004 after 43 years of broadcasting from Stanford, Kentucky.

The station's license was surrendered on December 15, 2017, and cancelled by the Federal Communications Commission on February 26, 2018.

== History ==
=== The early years in Stanford ===
WRSL went on air November 1, 1961, on 1520 kHz. The station was located halfway between Stanford and Lancaster on the farm of W. G. Morgan, one of the station's four owners, and broadcast with 500 watts during the day. The first initials of each of the four owners—W. G. Morgan, Ray Doss, S. C. Bybee, and Lanier Burchett—were reflected in the station's call letters. Blanchard had been a sales manager for WAIN at Columbia, but Morgan had no experience in radio; he was a funeral director and bank owner. The station initially had a block programming structure with a range of music formats. 1967 brought with it an FM extension, WRSL-FM 95.9; the two stations simulcast a country format for the next 15 years. Future Louisville television anchor and newspaper columnist Byron Crawford, a Stanford native, worked at WRSL while in high school.

Calvin C. Smith bought out Morgan and Bybee's shares in 1965, followed by Burchette's in 1969. Under Smith's ownership, an entertainment complex was built on the WRSL property, including a restaurant with two meeting rooms seating 200 and 75, known as the Frontier Dinner Theatre. The dinner theatre closed by 1976, when its restaurant equipment was sold at auction in order to convert the building to other uses. Just two months later, however, the dinner theatre reopened under the management of Jim and RubyAnn Cooper Gaskin, who also took over the operations of WRSL-AM-FM. The theatre closed again in 1979.

=== Under Gaskin ownership ===
The Gaskins ran WRSL-AM-FM until 1982, when health reasons forced Jim Gaskin to relinquish operations; owner Cal Smith then operated WRSL, typically with a southern Gospel format, until his death at the age of 55 from pancreatic cancer in 1987. His wife, Ruth, ran the station until she retired in 1994 and sold it to their son, John Smith. While the FM embarked on a signal upgrade and frequency change, the AM station changed its format to contemporary Christian. The AM station continued to share local news and weather with its sister FM outlet.

In 2001, WRSL-FM, hoping to trade on its expanded regional broadcast area, became WXKY; the next year, Smith opted to lease out all of the FM station's airtime to the Educational Media Foundation, which began programming Air 1. The local programming that had been airing on both frequencies migrated exclusively to 1520 AM.

=== The Corbin years ===
In 2004, land adjacent to the station was sold for the construction of a Walmart Supercenter; as construction proceeded on the new retail development, WRSL went off the air in late November after crews inadvertently cut underground utility cables to the station. The station property, also up for sale, was sold, and it was announced that the radio station was moving from Stanford to Corbin. Lincoln County was left without local radio until WPBK signed on in 2006; Lincoln-Garrard currently has operational control of WPBK. A local street in Stanford near the former Frontier Dinner Theatre is also still known as WRSL Road.

While in Corbin, WRSL operated at 1600 kHz. From 2008 to 2011, the station bore the call letters WKFO and broadcast a talk format as "Information 1600"; it was in common operation with new station WKFC (101.9 FM).

=== End of operations ===
WRSL ceased operation in late 2017, and on December 15, Lincoln-Garrard Broadcasting Company surrendered the license to the Federal Communications Commission.
