= Richland Farm =

Richland Farm may refer to:

- Richland Farm (Stanford, Kentucky), listed on the National Register of Historic Places listings in Lincoln County, Kentucky
- Richland Farm (Clarksville, Maryland), listed on the National Register of Historic Places in Howard County, Maryland
