= Pulaski County High School =

Pulaski County High School may refer to:

- Pulaski County High School (Kentucky) in Somerset, Kentucky
- Pulaski County High School (Virginia) in Dublin, Virginia
