= Adam Pence House =

Historic house in Kentucky, United States

- U.S. National Register of Historic Places
- Location within Kentucky
- Nearest city: Stanford, Kentucky
- Coordinates: 37.469516°N 84.632603°W
- Area: 0.5 acres (0.20 ha)
- Built: 1851
- Architectural style: Greek Revival
- NRHP reference No.: 78001376
- Added to NRHP: December 22, 1978

The Adam Pence House in Lincoln County, Kentucky, near Stanford, Kentucky, was built in 1851. It was listed on the National Register of Historic Places in 1978.

It was a red brick I-house with a rear ell, fronted by four two-story white pillars. In 1978 it was deemed "architecturally significant as being one of the grand Greek Revival rural residences of Lincoln County to survive in a relatively unaltered state."

It was built for Adam Pence in 1851 with bricks made ("burned") on its property, and with lumber transported from Somerset, Kentucky. Adam Pence fought in the War of 1812 and the house was built on land given to him for his service in that war.

An 1898 photo of the home, labelled as the "Matheny-Pence House on Old Somerset Road", appears in a Lincoln County history compiled by the local historical society. Labelled as "Yankees" in the photo are husband and wife Adam Richard Matheny and Franciska Hornath Matheny.

Its location is about 5 miles (8.0 km) south of Stanford on Kentucky Route 1247.
