= Kentucky Route 914 =

State highway in Kentucky, United States

Kentucky Route 914
- Veteran's Memorial Highway

Route information
- Maintained by KYTC
- Length: 13.301 mi (21.406 km)

Major junctions
- West end: Cumberland Expressway in Somerset
- KY 1577 in Oak Hill KY 1642 near Oak Hill US 27 in Somerset KY 1247 in Ferguson
- East end: KY 80 / Hal Rogers Parkway in Somerset

Location
- Country: United States
- State: Kentucky

Highway system
- Kentucky State Highway System; Interstate; US; State; Parkways
← KY 913	→ KY 915

Kentucky Route 914 (KY 914) is a highway in Somerset, Kentucky that encircles the city of Somerset.

== Route description ==
KY 914 begins at an interchange with the Cumberland Expressway northwest of downtown Somerset in Pulaski County, heading south as a four-lane divided highway. Most of the highway is within the city limits of Somerset due to annexations made by city government. The road passes through farm fields and comes to an intersection with KY 80/KY 6014. Here, KY 80 turns south to form a concurrency with KY 914, and the two routes head through a mix of farmland and woodland with some development. KY 80 splits to the west and KY 914 continues south-southeast through agricultural areas. The road intersects the southern terminus of KY 3261 and passes between residential areas to the west and farmland to the east prior to crossing KY 1577. The route passes through more agricultural areas with some nearby development and reaches a junction with KY 1642. At this point, KY 914 curves east and heads into business areas, intersecting U.S. Route 27 (US 27) in one of the few portions of the route not within Somerset city limits.

The road continues past commercial development and heads northeast into farmland, intersecting the eastern terminus of KY 1642. The route continues into a mix of farm fields, woods, and industrial development, where it intersects the southern terminus of KY 3057 and the northern terminus of former KY 2747. KY 914 comes to a bridge over a Norfolk Southern railroad line and crosses into the city limits of Ferguson and intersects KY 1247. The road passes through wooded areas with some fields and reaches the junction with KY 769 / Rush Branch Road. Following this, the road curves north before heading northwest back into Somerset and passing through farm fields and crossing KY 192. KY 914 continues northwest to its eastern terminus at KY 80 / Hal Rogers Parkway.

== Major intersections ==
The entire route is in Pulaski County.

Location	mi	km	Destinations	Notes
Somerset	0.000	0.000	Cumberland Expressway – Bowling Green, Lexington	Cumberland Pkwy. exit 86
Somerset	0.565	0.909	KY 80 east / KY 6014 west to US 27 – Somerset	West end of KY 80 overlap; eastern terminus of unsigned KY 6014
Somerset	1.356	2.182	KY 80 west / KY 80 Bus. east – Nancy, Somerset	East end of KY 80 overlap; western terminus of KY 80 Bus.
Somerset	3.058	4.921	KY 3261 north – Southwestern High School	Southern terminus of KY 3261
Somerset	3.465	5.576	KY 1577 (Oak Hill Road)	
Somerset	5.397	8.686	KY 1642 (Slate Branch Road)	
	6.169	9.928	US 27 – Burnside, Monticello, Somerset, General Burnside Island State Park	
Somerset	7.947	12.789	KY 1642 west (Parkers Mill Road) / Boat Dock Road	Eastern terminus of KY 1642
Somerset	8.188	13.177	KY 3057 north	Southern terminus of KY 3057; access to Lake Cumberland Regional Airport
Ferguson	8.946	14.397	KY 1247 to KY 90 – Ferguson, Burnside, Monticello	
Ferguson	10.504	16.905	KY 769 (Rush Branch Road)	
Somerset	12.900	20.761	KY 192 – Somerset, Mount Victory	
Somerset	13.301	21.406	KY 80 / Hal Rogers Parkway to Cumberland Expressway / I-75 / US 27 / Garner School Road – Somerset, Mount Vernon, London	
1.000 mi = 1.609 km; 1.000 km = 0.621 mi: Concurrency terminus
