= Kings Mountain, Kentucky =

Unincorporated community in Kentucky, United States

- Unincorporated community
- Location within Kentucky Location within the United States
- Coordinates: 37°22′21″N 84°41′17″W
- Country: United States
- State: Kentucky
- County: Lincoln
- Elevation: 1,178 ft (359 m)
- Time zone: UTC-5 (Eastern (EST))
  - Summer (DST): UTC-4 (EDT)
- ZIP code: 40442
- Area code: 606
- GNIS feature ID: 495764

Kings Mountain is an unincorporated community in southern Kentucky. Kings Mountain is located in Lincoln County along Kentucky Route 501 and the Norfolk Southern Railway, 11 miles (18 km) south of Stanford. Kings Mountain has a post office with ZIP code 40442.
