= Pulaski County High School (Kentucky) =

Location
- 511 E. University Drive; Pulaski County, KY; Somerset, Kentucky 42503; United States; 37.1063°N 84.6033°W

Information
- Type: Public
- Motto: Once a Maroon, Always a Maroon
- Established: 1950
- School district: Pulaski County Schools
- Superintendent: Kent Mayfield
- School number: (606) 679-1574
- Principal: Daniel Hill
- Assistant Principals: Brandon Foister; John Fraley
- Faculty: 64
- Teaching staff: 75.00 (FTE)
- Grades: 9–12
- Gender: Coed
- Enrollment: 1,113 (2024-2025)
- Student to teacher ratio: 15.64
- Hours in school day: 8:15-3:10
- Campus: Small city
- Colors: Maroon and white
- Fight song: Stand Up and Cheer (song)
- Athletics conference: KHSAA
- Mascot: The Maroon (Pirate)
- Nickname: Home of the Maroons
- Team name: Maroons/Lady Maroons
- Yearbook: The Brigadier
- Website: www.maroons.net

Pulaski County High School (PCHS) is a public high school located in Pulaski County, Kentucky, United States. It is operated by Pulaski County Schools. It serves the communities of Eubank, Shopville, Woodstock, and parts of the City of Somerset, Kentucky. It is fed by several schools operated by the Pulaski County district, namely Pulaski Elementary, Northern Elementary, Eubank Elementary, Shopville Elementary, and Northern Middle School. Students in the Science Hill area, which has its own school district that operates a single K-8 school, have the option of attending either Pulaski County High School, Southwestern High School or Somerset High School.

== Students ==
PCHS serves grades nine through twelve. At last count, about 1,113 students were enrolled.

== Sports ==
Sports at PCHS include baseball, softball, football, basketball, track, golf, soccer, volleyball, archery, cheerleading, dance, tennis and swim teams. The school mascot is a pirate.

In 2014, The Maroons won the first football state title in Pulaski County History among all 3 schools.

Former NBA player Reggie Hanson played for the Maroons in high school before attending the University of Kentucky.

Former MLB player Josh Anderson played for the Maroons in High school before attending Eastern Kentucky University.

== Music ==
Pulaski County High School offers a variety of performing ensembles and competitive groups.

=== Band Department ===
- Marching Band
- Concert Band
- Pep Band
- Jazz Band
- Winter Drumline
- Winter Guard
- Jr. Winter Guard

=== Choral Department ===
- Concert Choir
- Chamber Choir
- Advanced Women's Choir
- Drama
