= Danville micropolitan area, Kentucky =

Danville, Kentucky Area
- Micropolitan Statistical Area
- Danville, KY Micropolitan Statistical Area
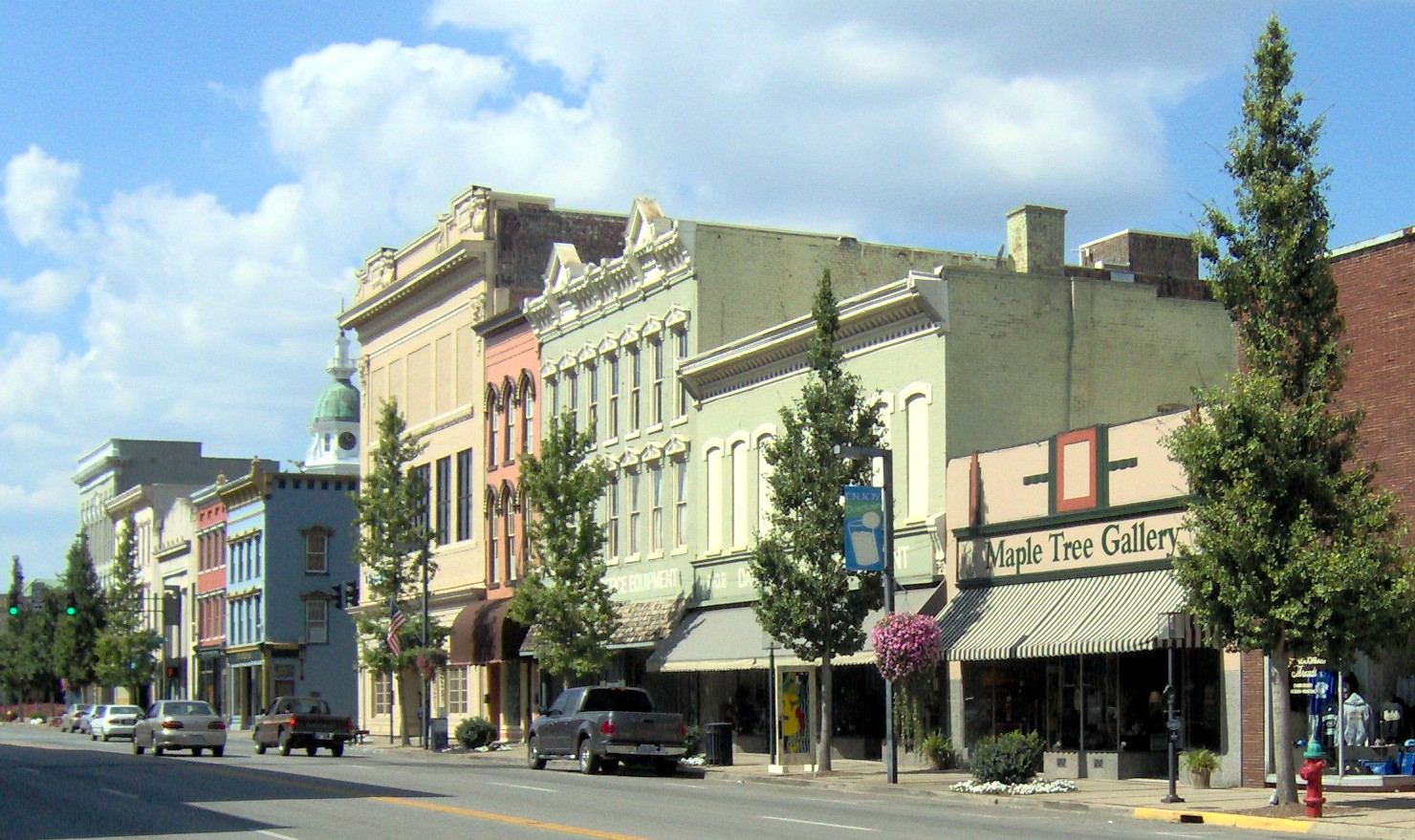
- Downtown Danville
Interactive Map of Danville, KY μSA
City of Danville, KY
Danville, KY μSA
- Country: United States
- State: Kentucky
- Largest city: Danville
- Time zone: UTC−5 (EST)
  - Summer (DST): UTC−4 (EDT)

The Danville Micropolitan Statistical Area, as defined by the United States Census Bureau, is an area consisting of Boyle and Lincoln counties in Kentucky, anchored by the city of Danville. As of the 2000 census, the μSA had a population of 51,058. A July 1, 2009 estimate placed the population at 54,435.

Site Selection magazine ranked the Danville Micropolitan Statistical Area 41st out of 694 micro-communities in the United States for new and expanding economic development projects in 2008.

== Counties ==
- Boyle
- Lincoln

== Communities ==
- Crab Orchard
- Danville (Principal city)
- Eubank (partial)
- Hustonville
- Junction City
- Perryville
- Stanford

== Demographics ==
As of the census of 2000, there were 51,058 people, 19,780 households, and 14,077 families residing within the μSA. The racial makeup of the μSA was 91.59% White, 6.41% African American, 0.17% Native American, 0.35% Asian, 0.02% Pacific Islander, 0.52% from other races, and 0.94% from two or more races. Hispanic or Latino of any race were 1.19% of the population.

The median income for a household in the μSA was $30,892, and the median income for a family was $37,492. Males had a median income of $29,903 versus $22,076 for females. The per capita income for the μSA was $15,945.

== See also ==
- Kentucky census statistical areas
