= Kentucky Route 1284 =

State highway in Kentucky, United States

Kentucky Route 1284
- KY 1284 highlighted in red

Route information
- Maintained by KYTC
- Length: 6.365 mi (10.243 km)

Major junctions
- West end: US 27 north of Cynthiana
- East end: US 62 northeast of Cynthiana

Location
- Country: United States
- State: Kentucky
- Counties: Harrison

Highway system
- Kentucky State Highway System; Interstate; US; State; Parkways
← KY 1283	→ KY 1285

Kentucky Route 1284, also known as Sunrise-Richland Road and Sunrise-Claysville Road, acts as a cutoff between US-27 and US-62 north of Cynthiana. It is a completely rural route through rolling farmland and has no major junctions.

== Route description ==
KY 1284 begins at an intersection with US 27 north of Cynthiana in Harrison County, heading east on two-lane undivided Sunrise-Richland Road. The road passes through a mix of farmland and woodland with some homes. The route turns south onto Sunrise-Claysville Road and passes through more rural areas, curving east. KY 1284 winds southeast and reaches its eastern terminus at US 62.

== Major intersections ==
The entire route is in Harrison County.

Location	mi	km	Destinations	Notes
	0.000	0.000	US 27 (Falmouth Road)	
	6.365	10.243	US 62 (Oddville Pike)	
1.000 mi = 1.609 km; 1.000 km = 0.621 mi
