= Eubank, Kentucky =

- City
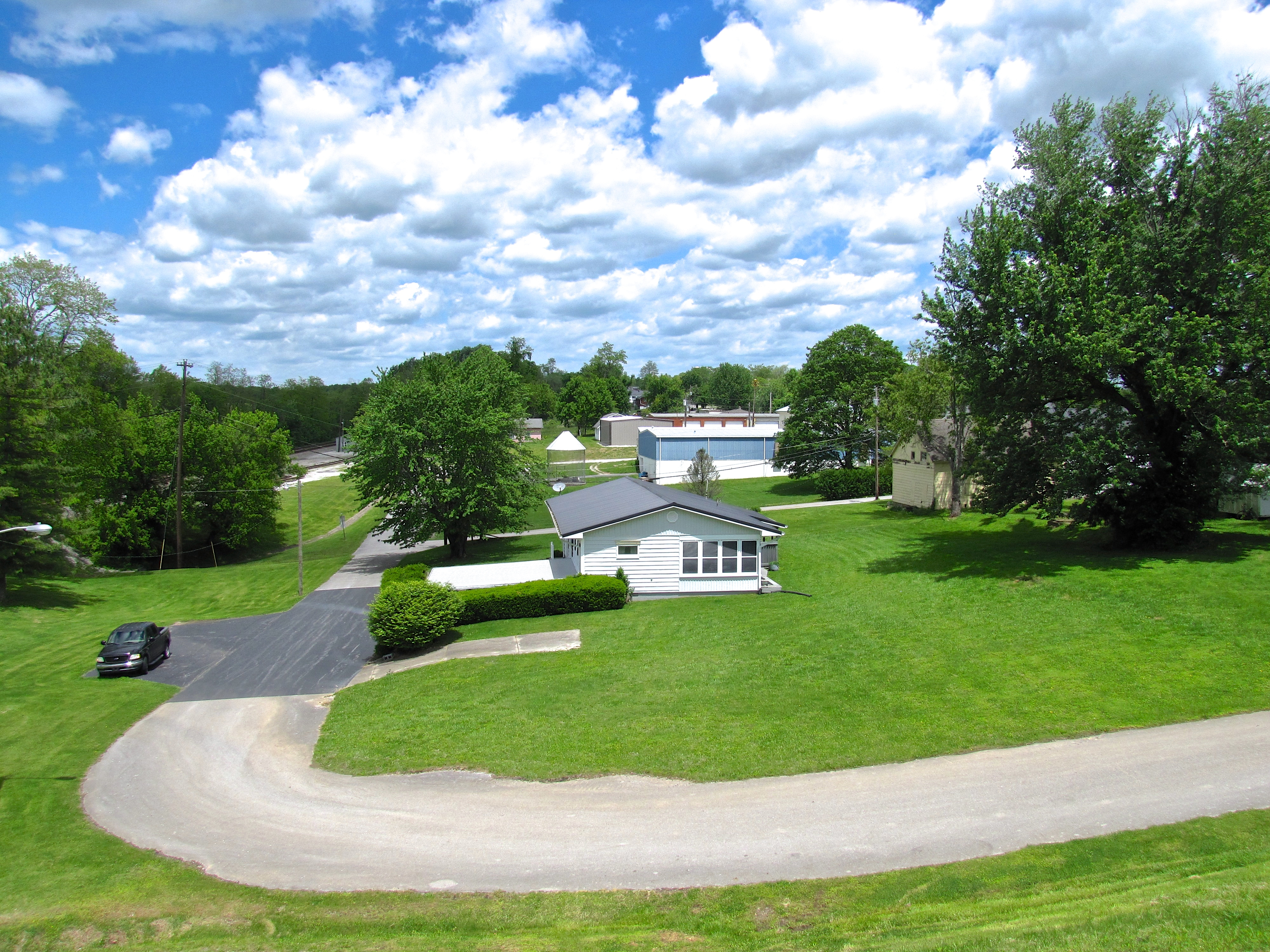
- Houses in Eubank

- Location in Pulaski and Lincoln counties, Kentucky
- Coordinates: 37°16′48″N 84°39′15″W
- Country: United States
- State: Kentucky
- Counties: Pulaski, Lincoln

Government
  - Mayor: Frey Todd

Area
  - Total: 0.85 sq mi (2.21 km^{2})
  - Land: 0.85 sq mi (2.19 km^{2})
  - Water: 0.0039 sq mi (0.01 km^{2})
- Elevation: 1,188 ft (362 m)

Population (2020)
  - Total: 313
  - Density: 369.5/sq mi (142.65/km^{2})
- Time zone: UTC-5 (Eastern (EST))
  - Summer (DST): UTC-4 (EDT)
- ZIP code: 42567
- Area code: 606
- FIPS code: 21-25552
- GNIS feature ID: 2403573
- Website: cityofeubank.com

Eubank is a home rule-class city in Pulaski and Lincoln counties in southern Kentucky. As of the 2020 census, Eubank had a population of 313.

The Pulaski County portion of Eubank is part of the Somerset Micropolitan Statistical Area, while the Lincoln County portion is part of the Danville Micropolitan Statistical Area.

== History ==
The town was named for Joseph Eubank who crossed over the Cumberland Gap with Daniel Boone and was granted deed as the original landowner. Eubank was a stop on the Cincinnati Southern Railroad. It was incorporated by the state assembly in 1886 and is also known as "Eubanks".

== Geography ==
Eubank is located in northern Pulaski County. A small portion extends north into Lincoln County. The city is concentrated around the intersection of Kentucky Route 1247 and Kentucky Route 70. U.S. Route 27 passes along the city's eastern border, leading south 14 miles (23 km) to Somerset, the Pulaski county seat, and north 18 miles (29 km) to Stanford, the Lincoln county seat. KY 70 leads east 23 miles (37 km) to Mount Vernon and west 24 miles (39 km) to Liberty.

According to the United States Census Bureau, Eubank has a total area of 0.85 square miles (2.2 km^{2}), of which 2.47 acres (0.01 km^{2}), or 0.63%, are water.

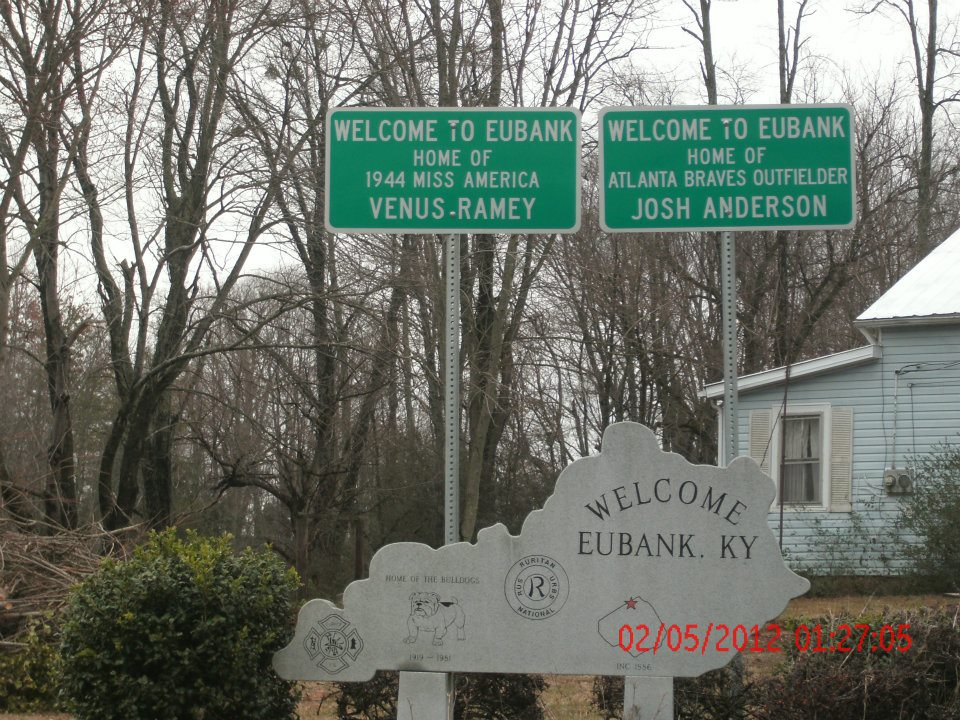
Welcome sign in Eubank

== Demographics ==
Historical population
Census	Pop.	Note	%±
1910	182		—
1920	312		71.4%
1930	334		7.1%
1940	303		−9.3%
1950	322		6.3%
1960	303		−5.9%
1970	230		−24.1%
1980	207		−10.0%
1990	354		71.0%
2000	358		1.1%
2010	319		−10.9%
2020	313		−1.9%
U.S. Decennial Census

As of the census of 2000, there were 358 people, 141 households, and 102 families residing in the city. The population density was 395.2 per square mile (152.6/km^{2}). There were 173 housing units at an average density of 191.0 per square mile (73.7/km^{2}). The racial makeup of the city was 97.77% White, 1.68% Native American, and 0.56% from two or more races.

There were 141 households, out of which 31.2% had children under the age of 18 living with them, 55.3% were married couples living together, 14.9% had a female householder with no husband present, and 27.0% were non-families. 27.0% of all households were made up of individuals, and 14.2% had someone living alone who was 65 years of age or older. The average household size was 2.54 and the average family size was 3.06.

The age distribution was 26.3% under the age of 18, 8.9% from 18 to 24, 29.3% from 25 to 44, 20.9% from 45 to 64, and 14.5% who were 65 years of age or older. The median age was 35 years. For every 100 females, there were 87.4 males. For every 100 females age 18 and over, there were 82.1 males.

The median income for a household in the city was $18,409, and the median income for a family was $19,625. Males had a median income of $26,944 versus $16,667 for females. The per capita income for the city was $15,599. About 22.4% of families and 32.2% of the population were below the poverty line, including 52.9% of those under age 18 and 17.5% of those age 65 or over.

== Education ==
For the Pulaski County part, Eubank Elementary School, also sometimes initialized as EES, is a public elementary school in the community. It is under the administration of Pulaski County Schools. The school provides education to grades 1–5. After attending EES, students attend Northern Middle School, then attend Pulaski County High School. An independent school district named Science Hill Independent School District also serves the Pulaski County part of Eubank.

For the Lincoln County part, Waynesburg Elementary School, also sometimes initialized as WES, is a public elementary school in the community. It is under the administration of Lincoln County Schools. The school provides education to grades 1–5. After attending WES, students attend Lincoln County Middle School, then attend Lincoln County High School.
