= Abraham Miller House =

- U.S. National Register of Historic Places
- Location within Kentucky Location within the United States
- Location: 3475 Kentucky Route 300, near Stanford, Kentucky
- Coordinates: 37°33′34″N 84°44′27″W
- Area: 1.6 acres (0.65 ha)
- Built: c.1800
- Built by: Miller, Abraham
- Architectural style: Saddlebag log house
- NRHP reference No.: 00001083
- Added to NRHP: March 6, 2001

The Abraham Miller House, near Stanford, Kentucky, was listed on the National Register of Historic Places in 2001.

It is uses saddlebag architecture, a two-room one-story log building built between 1785 and 1815.
