= Kentucky Route 78 =

State highway in Kentucky

Kentucky Route 78
- KY 78 highlighted in red

Route information
- Maintained by KYTC
- Length: 25.300 mi (40.716 km)

Major junctions
- West end: KY 49 in rural Casey Co
- US 127 in Hustonville; US 27 in Stanford
- East end: US 150 near Stanford

Location
- Country: United States
- State: Kentucky
- Counties: Casey, Lincoln

Highway system
- Kentucky State Highway System; Interstate; US; State; Parkways
← KY 77	→ US 79

Kentucky Route 78 (KY 78) is a 25.300-mile-long (40.716 km) state highway in Kentucky that runs from KY 49 in rural Casey County northwest of Liberty to U.S. Route 150 (US 150) southeast of Stanford via Hustonville and Stanford. Much of the route follows the old Cumberland Trail from Stanford, KY to Nashville, TN.

== Major intersections ==
County	Location	mi	km	Destinations	Notes
Casey		0.000	0.000	KY 49	Western terminus
Casey		4.125	6.639	KY 243 north (Little South Road)	Southern terminus of KY 243
Casey		9.119	14.676	KY 906 south	West end of KY 906 overlap
Casey		9.303	14.972	KY 906 north	East end of KY 906 overlap
Lincoln	Hustonville	12.077	19.436	US 127	
Lincoln		16.941	27.264	KY 198 south	Northern terminus of KY 198
Lincoln		19.954	32.113	KY 1194 west	Eastern terminus of KY 1194
Lincoln		21.331	34.329	KY 300 west (Knob Lick Road)	West end of KY 300 overlap
Lincoln	Stanford	22.161	35.665	KY 2319 west (Helm Street)	Eastern terminus of KY 2319
Lincoln	Stanford	22.195	35.719	KY 300 east (Danville Avenue)	East end of KY 330 overlap
Lincoln	Stanford	22.336	35.946	KY 1247 south (Somerset Street) / Mill Street	West end of KY 1247 overlap
Lincoln	Stanford	22.409	36.064	KY 1247 north (North Lancaster Street) / South Lancaster Street	East end of KY 1247 overlap
Lincoln	Stanford	22.987	36.994	US 27	
Lincoln		25.300	40.716	US 150	Eastern terminus
1.000 mi = 1.609 km; 1.000 km = 0.621 mi
