= McCormack Church =

Historic church in Kentucky, United States

- U.S. National Register of Historic Places
- Location within Kentucky Location within the United States
- Nearest city: Stanford, Kentucky
- Coordinates: 37°31′38″N 84°44′37″W
- Area: 1 acre (0.40 ha)
- Built: 1820
- Architectural style: Federal
- NRHP reference No.: 76000916
- Added to NRHP: March 16, 1976

The McCormack Church is a historic church near Stanford, Kentucky. It was built in 1820 and added to the National Register in 1976.

It is a brick building on a stone foundation, with brick laid in Flemish bond.

It is located 4 miles (6.4 km) southwest of Stanford on State Highway 1194, on the west bank of Hanging Fork Creek.
