= Kentucky Route 913 =

State highway in Kentucky, United States

Kentucky Route 913
- Blankenbaker Parkway
- KY 913; mainline in red, connector route in blue

Route information
- Maintained by KYTC
- Length: 4.337 mi (6.980 km)

Major junctions
- South end: KY 155 in Jeffersontown
- I-64
- North end: US 60 in Middletown

Location
- Country: United States
- State: Kentucky
- Counties: Jefferson

Highway system
- Kentucky State Highway System; Interstate; US; State; Parkways
← KY 912	→ KY 914

Kentucky Route 913 (KY 913) is a 4.337-mile-long (6.980 km) state highway located in Louisville, Kentucky. The route begins at a junction with KY 155 in Jeffersontown and ends at a junction with US 60 in Middletown.

It is known as Blankenbaker Parkway for its entirety.

== Route description ==
Blankenbaker Parkway originates at a junction with KY 155 in a residential area east of Jeffersontown. It travels northward as a divided two-lane road before becoming a four-lane divided roadway as it curves toward the northeast at a junction with KY 913 Spur. Blankenbaker Parkway then curves back toward the north and passes through an industrial area. After forming a junction with Plantside Drive, Blankenbaker Parkway becomes three lanes in both directions, passing through a commercial area with many businesses, restaurants, and hotels lining the roadway. After passing over I-64, Blankenbaker Parkway narrows to two lanes in both directions and passes by the main campus of Southeast Christian Church, one of the largest churches in the United States. It forms a concurrency with KY 1819 at the northeast corner of the church property and carries this concurrency for 0.586 miles (0.943 km) to its northern terminus at US 60.

== Major intersections ==
The entire route is in Jefferson County.

Location	mi	km	Destinations	Notes
Louisville	0.000	0.000	KY 155 (Taylorsville Road) – Downtown Jeffersontown	
Louisville	0.613	0.987	KY 913C south (Blankenbaker Access Drive)	
Jeffersontown	2.829	4.553	I-64 – Louisville, Lexington	I-64 exit 17
Middletown	3.382	5.443	KY 1819 south (North Watterson Trail)	South end of KY 1819 overlap
Douglass Hills			KY 1819 north (North Watterson Trail)	North end of KY 1819 overlap
Douglass Hills	4.217	6.787	Main Street ( KY 2840 east)	Western terminus of KY 2840
Douglass Hills	4.337	6.980	US 60 (Shelbyville Road)	
1.000 mi = 1.609 km; 1.000 km = 0.621 mi: Concurrency terminus

== KY 913C ==
Kentucky Route 913C
- Location: Louisville
- Length: 0.500 mi (805 m)

Kentucky Route 913C (KY 913C) is 0.500 miles (0.805 km) long and connects KY 1819 to Blankenbaker Parkway near its southern terminus. It is known as Blankenbaker Access Drive for its entirety.

== See also ==
- Roads in Louisville, Kentucky
