= Bethelridge, Kentucky =

Bethelridge
- Unincorporated community
- Location within the state of Kentucky Bethelridge (the United States)
- Coordinates: 37°14′1″N 84°45′30″W
- Country: United States
- State: Kentucky
- County: Casey
- Elevation: 1,138 ft (347 m)
- Time zone: UTC-5 (Eastern (EST))
  - Summer (DST): UTC-4 (EST)
- ZIP codes: 42516
- GNIS feature ID: 507499

Bethelridge is an unincorporated community in southeastern Casey County, Kentucky, United States. Their post office was in operation from May 14, 1890, until it closed in November 2011.
