= Southwestern High School (Kentucky) =

Location
- 1765 WTLO Road; Somerset, Kentucky 42503; United States; 37.0612°N 84.6555°W

Information
- Type: Public
- Established: 1993
- School district: Pulaski County
- Superintendent: Kent Mayfield
- Principal: Mark Flynn
- Assistant Principals: Chris Meyers; Casey Daulton
- Staff: 72.00 (FTE)
- Grades: 9–12
- Enrollment: 1,203 (2023-2024)
- Student to teacher ratio: 16.71
- Campus: Small city
- Colors: Blue and orange
- Athletics conference: KHSAA
- Nickname: Warriors (boys and girls)
- Website: www.southwesternhigh.net

Southwestern High School is a public high school in Somerset, Kentucky. Operated by Pulaski County Schools, Southwestern opened its doors in the fall of 1993 to alleviate crowding at the district's other high school, Pulaski County High School. It is fed by several schools operated by the Pulaski County district, namely Nancy Elementary, Burnside Elementary, Southern Elementary, Oak Hill Elementary, and Southern Middle School. Students at Science Hill School, a K–8 school operated by a separate district within Pulaski County, have the option of attending either Southwestern High School, Pulaski County High School or Somerset High School.

== Athletics ==
- Archery (co-ed)
- Baseball (boys only)
- Basketball (boys and girls, separate teams)
- Cheerleading (girls only)
- Cross Country (boys and girls, separate teams)
- Dance Team (boys and girls)
- Football (boys only)
- Golf (boys and girls, separate teams)
- JROTC (co-ed)
- Robotics Team (one team, boys and girls)
- Soccer (boys and girls, separate teams)
- Softball (girls only)
- Swim Team (boys and girls, separate teams)
- Track (boys and girls, separate teams)
- Tennis (boys and girls, separate teams)
- Volleyball (girls only)

== Music department ==
=== Bands ===
- Marching band
- Symphonic band
- Jazz band
