= Logan House (Finchville, Kentucky) =

Historic house in Kentucky, United States

- U.S. National Register of Historic Places
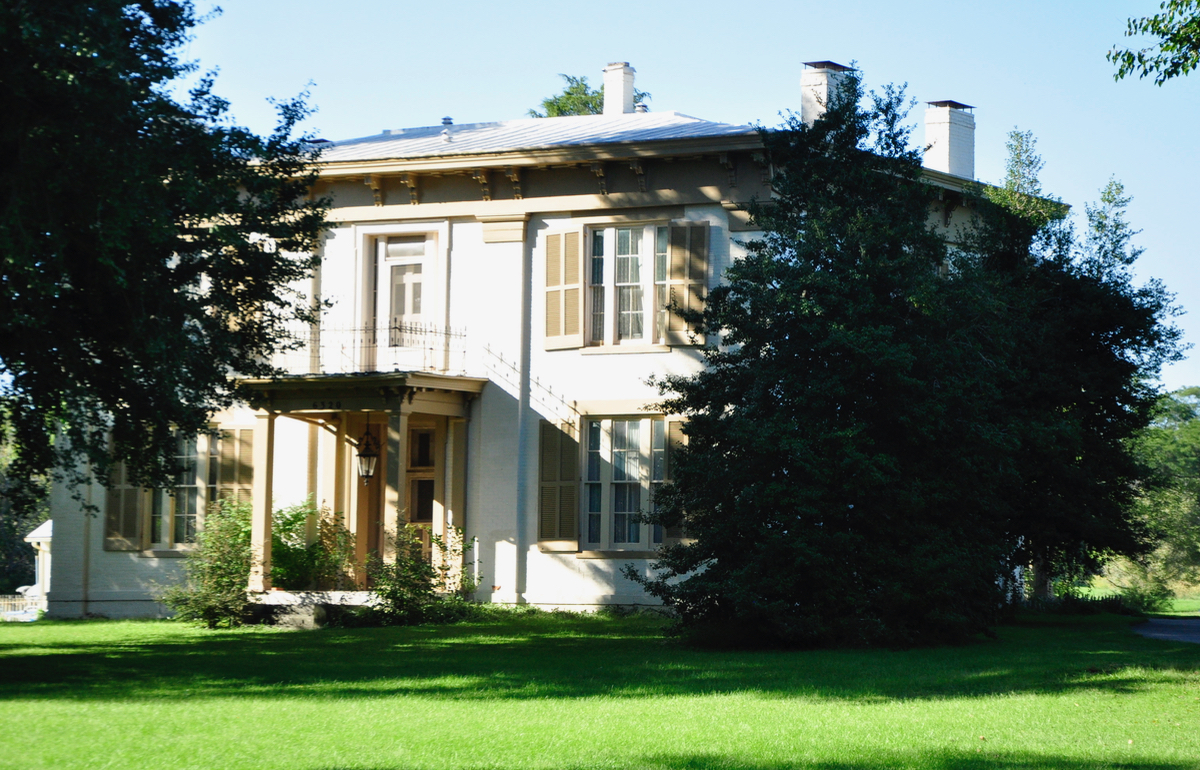
- Logan House, view looking north-west. 2018

- Location within Kentucky Location within the United States
- Location: Brunerstown Rd. at Bullskin Creek, near Finchville, Kentucky
- Coordinates: 38°11′31″N 85°18′01″W
- Area: 2.1 acres (0.85 ha)
- Built: 1860
- MPS: Shelby County MRA
- NRHP reference No.: 88002929
- Added to NRHP: December 27, 1988

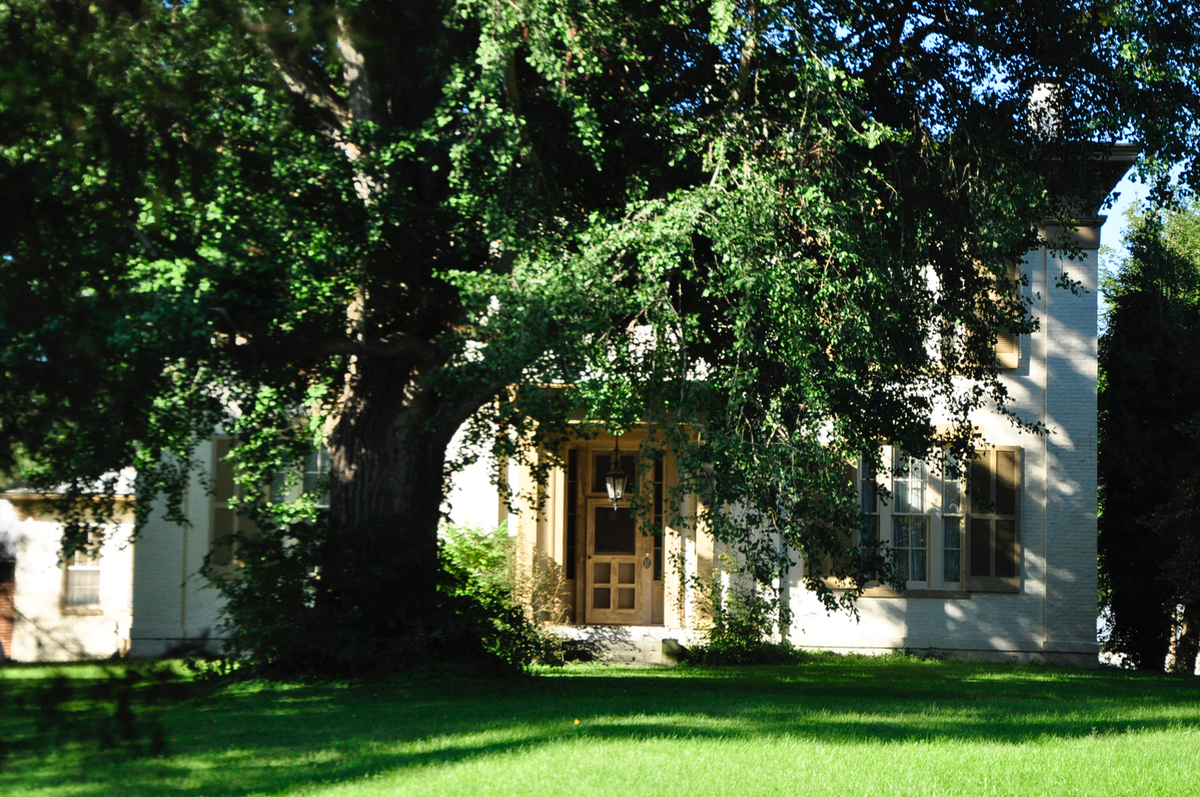
Logan House located in Finchville, Kentucky. Photograph taken on September 28, 2018, looking towards the north.

The Logan House, in the area of Finchville, Kentucky, was built in about 1860. It was listed on the National Register of Historic Places in 1988.

It is a center passage plan brick building on an ashlar foundation. The house is believed to have been built around 1860 "by a descendant of Kentucky pioneer Benjamin Logan who settled on this site in 1794 on a 1,000-acre land grant. Logan is said to have built a house and grist mill on the site and lived here until his death in 1802."

The listing included five contributing buildings.
