= Strunk, Kentucky =

Unincorporated community in Kentucky, United States

- Unincorporated community
- Location within Kentucky Location within the United States
- Coordinates: 36°37′19″N 84°26′1″W
- Country: United States
- State: Kentucky
- County: McCreary
- Elevation: 1,427 ft (435 m)
- Time zone: UTC-6 (Eastern (EST))
  - Summer (DST): UTC-5 (CST)
- ZIP codes: 42649
- GNIS feature ID: 515763

Strunk is an unincorporated community and coal town in McCreary County, Kentucky, United States. The community's post office was established as Strunk Lane on February 18, 1892, and was probably named for George W. Strunk, who owned a local coal mine. By 1894, the post office's name was simplified to Strunk. Its ZIP code is 42649.

== Notable people ==
- Master Sergeant Wilburn K. Ross, Medal of Honor Recipient for his service during World War II
