= Phil, Kentucky =

Phil
- Unincorporated community
- Location within the state of Kentucky Phil (the United States)
- Coordinates: 37°12′55″N 84°57′13″W
- Country: United States
- State: Kentucky
- County: Casey
- Elevation: 778 ft (237 m)
- Time zone: UTC-6 (Central (CST))
  - Summer (DST): UTC-5 (CST)
- GNIS feature ID: 508815

Phil is an unincorporated community in western Casey County, Kentucky, United States. Their post office is no longer in service. It was named by F. P. Combest, the community's first postmaster, for his favorite politician, U.S. Representative Phil Thompson.
