= Kentucky Route 1247 =

State highway in Kentucky, United States

Kentucky Route 1247
- KY 1247 highlighted in red

Route information
- Maintained by KYTC
- Length: 41.340 mi (66.530 km)

Major junctions
- South end: US 27 / KY 90 at Burnside
- KY 914 in Somerset; KY 39 in Somerset; KY 80 in Somerset; US 27 near Science Hill; KY 70 at Eubank; US 27 / KY 328 near Waynesburg; KY 78 in Stanford
- North end: US 27 in Stanford

Location
- Country: United States
- State: Kentucky
- Counties: Pulaski, Lincoln

Highway system
- Kentucky State Highway System; Interstate; US; State; Parkways
← KY 1246	→ KY 1248

Kentucky Route 1247 (KY 1247) is a 41.340-mile-long (66.530 km) secondary state highway in southeast-central Kentucky. It traverses Pulaski and Lincoln counties. The highway was formerly signed as U.S. Route 27 (US 27).

== Route description ==
KY 1247 starts at a major interchange-style junction at Burnside where KY 90 begins its currency with US 27 southward into McCreary County. KY 1247 goes northward to cross the KY 914 (Somerset Bypass). It then traverses downtown Somerset, where it crosses two alignments of KY 80, the KY 80 Business first, and then the main KY 80 alignment.

Beyond that point while traversing the communities of Science Hill and Eubank and crossing KY 70 at Eubank, KY 1247 closely follows US 27 for the remainder of the route's length. However, there are two occasions where it runs concurrently with US 27 in southern and central Lincoln County. KY 328 is the only other route that KY 1247 runs concurrently with at one point in southern Lincoln County.

== History ==
Most of KY 1247's current alignment north of Somerset was the original alignment of US 27 until the 1960s, when a streamlined alignment of US 27 was built in Lincoln and northern Pulaski County.

Since 2015, KY 1247 is now accessible from a new interchange of the recently extended Louie B. Nunn Cumberland Parkway.

== Major intersections ==
County	Location	mi	km	Destinations	Notes
Pulaski	Burnside	0.000	0.000	US 27 / KY 90	Southern terminus
Pulaski	Somerset	3.950	6.357	KY 914	
Pulaski	Somerset	5.141	8.274	KY 1580	
Pulaski	Somerset	5.219	8.399	KY 3057	
Pulaski	Somerset	6.378	10.264	KY 2292	
Pulaski	Somerset	6.851	11.026	KY 2303	
Pulaski	Somerset	7.244	11.658	KY 80 Bus. east	Southern end of KY 80 Bus. eastbound concurrency, one way eastbound
Pulaski	Somerset	7.253	11.673	KY 80 Bus. west	Northern end of KY 80 Bus. eastbound concurrency, southern end of KY 80 Bus. westbound concurrency
Pulaski	Somerset	7.278	11.713	KY 80 Bus.	Northern end of KY 80 Bus. eastbound concurrency, one way westbound
Pulaski	Somerset	7.864	12.656	KY 39	
Pulaski	Somerset	7.992	12.862	KY 80	
Pulaski	Somerset	8.414	13.541	KY 1575	
Pulaski	Norwood	11.680	18.797	KY 2227	
Pulaski	Norwood	11.742	18.897	US 27	
Pulaski	Science Hill	13.171	21.197	KY 2309	
Pulaski	Science Hill	13.885	22.346	KY 635	
Pulaski	Science Hill	14.762	23.757	KY 2308	
Pulaski		16.949	27.277	KY 452	
Pulaski		17.951	28.889	US 27	
Pulaski		19.049	30.656	KY 1721	
Pulaski		19.852	31.949	US 27	
Pulaski	Eubank	22.274	35.847	KY 70	
Lincoln		24.381	39.237	US 27	Southern end of US 27 concurrency
Lincoln		24.588	39.571	US 27	Northern end of US 27 concurrency
Lincoln		25.538	41.099	KY 328	Southern end of KY 328 concurrency
Lincoln		25.557	41.130	KY 328	Northern end of KY 328 concurrency
Lincoln		25.722	41.396	US 27 / KY 328	Southern end of US 27 concurrency, southern end of KY 328 concurrency
Lincoln		26.090	41.988	US 27	Northern end of US 27 concurrency
Lincoln		26.109	42.018	KY 328	Northern end of KY 328 concurrency
Lincoln		28.374	45.664	KY 1781	
Lincoln		29.948	48.197	KY 501	
Lincoln		30.825	49.608	US 27	
Lincoln		31.637	50.915	US 27	Southern end of US 27 concurrency
Lincoln		31.700	51.016	US 27	Northern end of US 27 concurrency
Lincoln		33.946	54.631	US 27	Southern end of US 27 concurrency
Lincoln		34.274	55.159	US 27	Northern end of US 27 concurrency
Lincoln		34.643	55.753	US 27	Southern end of US 27 concurrency
Lincoln		34.677	55.807	US 27	Northern end of US 27 concurrency
Lincoln		39.757	63.983	US 27	Southern end of US 27 concurrency
Lincoln		40.453	65.103	US 27	Northern end of US 27 concurrency
Lincoln	Stanford	40.515	65.203	KY 78	Southern end of KY 78 concurrency
Lincoln	Stanford	40.588	65.320	KY 78	Northern end of KY 78 concurrency
Lincoln	Stanford	41.340	66.530	US 27	Northern terminus
1.000 mi = 1.609 km; 1.000 km = 0.621 mi: Concurrency terminus
