= Hustonville, Kentucky =

- City
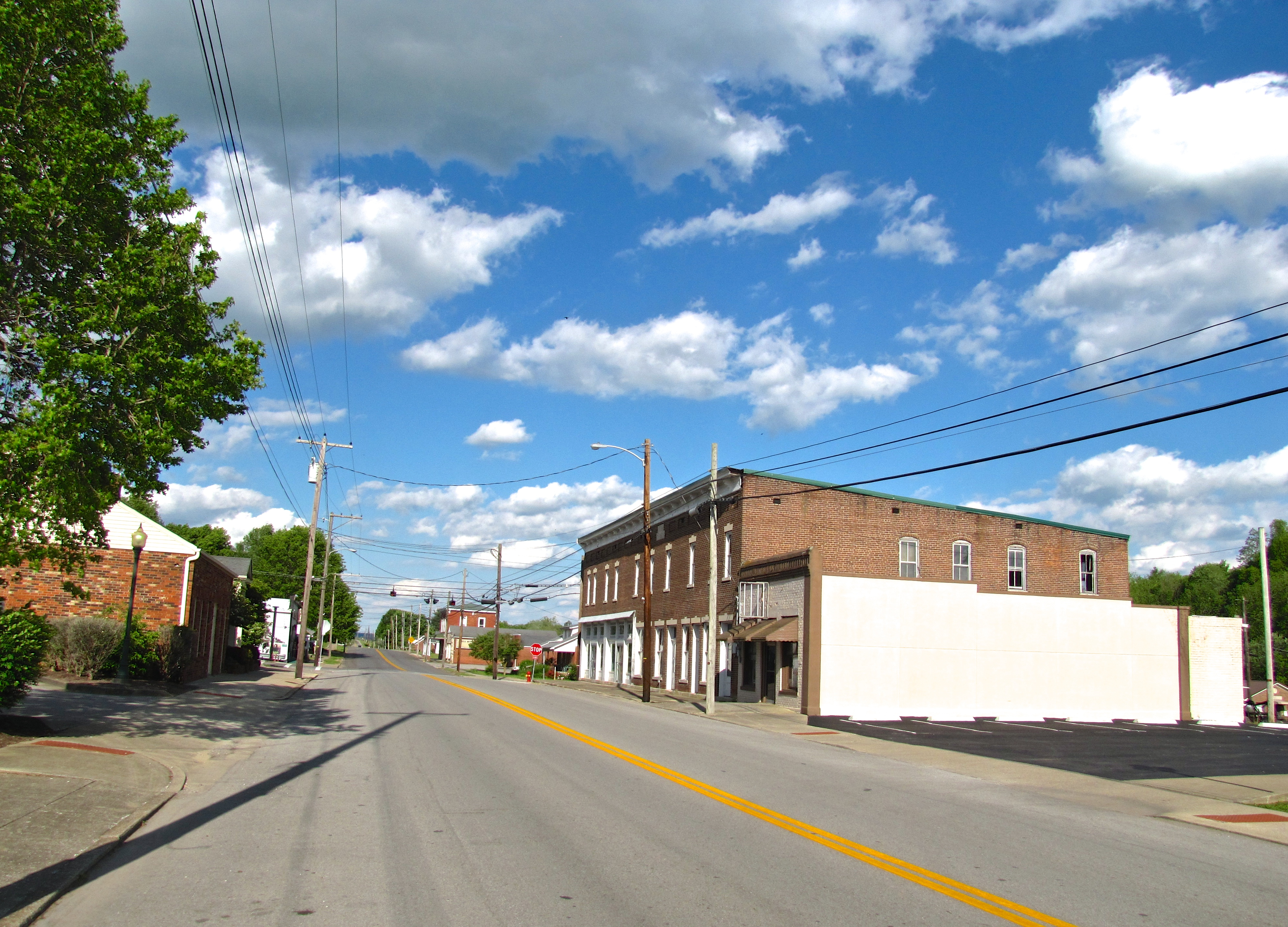
- Main Street (KY 78) in Hustonville

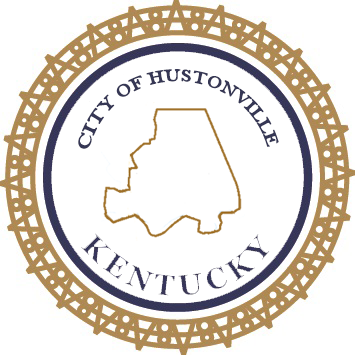
- Seal

- Location of Hustonville in Lincoln County, Kentucky.
- Coordinates: 37°28′42″N 84°48′54″W
- Country: United States
- State: Kentucky
- County: Lincoln
- Established: 1836
- Incorporated: 1850

Area
  - Total: 0.74 sq mi (1.91 km^{2})
  - Land: 0.74 sq mi (1.91 km^{2})
  - Water: 0 sq mi (0.00 km^{2})
- Elevation: 1,034 ft (315 m)

Population (2020)
  - Total: 387
  - Density: 524.5/sq mi (202.51/km^{2})
- Time zone: UTC-5 (Eastern (EST))
  - Summer (DST): UTC-4 (EDT)
- ZIP code: 40437
- Area code: 606
- FIPS code: 21-38836
- GNIS feature ID: 2404750
- Website: www.hustonvilleky.com/index.html

Hustonville is a home rule-class city in Lincoln County, Kentucky, in the United States. As of the 2020 census, Hustonville had a population of 387. It is part of the Danville Micropolitan Statistical Area.

== History ==
The community was originally known as The Crossroads from its location on trails connecting the Kentucky and Green rivers and the Falls of the Ohio with Logan's Fort (present-day Stanford). It was then known as Farmington and, after the 1818 erection of a post office, Hanging Fork after a local stream named for two bandits who were hanged by Virginia officers rather than escorted back for trial. For three months in 1826, it was known as New Store, but the name then returned to Hanging Fork. When the town was established on February 29, 1836, it was renamed Hustonville after two local landowners; the post office adopted the name the next year. The city was formally incorporated by the state assembly in 1850.

During the mid 19th and early 20th centuries, Hustonville was home to Christian College. The school was established following a fundraising campaign by William Logan Williams, who had been instrumental in securing money for church construction in the city. Future U.S. senator and Governor of Kentucky, Augustus O. Stanley, served as chair of belles-lettres at the school in 1890.

== Geography ==
According to the United States Census Bureau, the city has a total area of 0.6 square miles (1.6 km^{2}), all land. The city is concentrated along Kentucky Route 78 (Main Street), just east of its intersection with U.S. Route 127, in northwestern Lincoln County. The city lies near the headwaters of Hanging Fork Creek, a tributary of the Dix River.

== Demographics ==
Historical population
Census	Pop.	Note	%±
1860	215		—
1870	320		48.8%
1880	353		10.3%
1890	435		23.2%
1900	425		−2.3%
1910	384		−9.6%
1920	372		−3.1%
1930	405		8.9%
1940	443		9.4%
1950	435		−1.8%
1960	387		−11.0%
1970	413		6.7%
1980	339		−17.9%
1990	313		−7.7%
2000	347		10.9%
2010	405		16.7%
2020	387		−4.4%
U.S. Decennial Census

As of the census of 2000, there were 347 people, 165 households, and 100 families residing in the city. The population density was 628.9 per square mile (242.8/km^{2}). There were 181 housing units at an average density of 328.0 per square mile (126.6/km^{2}). The racial makeup of the city was 96.83% White, 1.15% African American, 0.29% Asian, and 1.73% from two or more races.

There were 165 households, out of which 21.8% had children under the age of 18 living with them, 45.5% were married couples living together, 11.5% had a female householder with no husband present, and 38.8% were non-families. 34.5% of all households were made up of individuals, and 19.4% had someone living alone who was 65 years of age or older. The average household size was 2.10 and the average family size was 2.67.

In the city, the population was spread out, with 17.3% under the age of 18, 6.1% from 18 to 24, 23.3% from 25 to 44, 28.2% from 45 to 64, and 25.1% who were 65 years of age or older. The median age was 46 years. For every 100 females, there were 81.7 males. For every 100 females age 18 and over, there were 85.2 males.

The median income for a household in the city was $33,750, and the median income for a family was $45,000. Males had a median income of $29,167 versus $22,917 for females. The per capita income for the city was $16,379. About 9.6% of families and 19.6% of the population were below the poverty line, including 12.2% of those under age 18 and 30.9% of those age 65 or over.
