= Somerset High School (Kentucky) =

Location
- 301 College Street; Somerset, Kentucky 42501; United States; 37.09556°N 84.60154°W

Information
- School type: Public
- Motto: "Through these halls walk tomorrow's leaders."
- Founded: 1888
- School district: Somerset Independent School District
- Superintendent: Jeff Wesley
- Principal: Gwynne Baker
- Teaching staff: 40.33 (FTE)
- Grades: 9–12
- Enrollment: 526 (2023–2024)
- Student to teacher ratio: 13.04
- Language: English
- Colors: Purple and gold
- Mascot: Cecil the Briar Jumper
- Nickname: Briar Jumpers
- Accreditation: Southern Association of Colleges and Schools
- Yearbook: Homespun
- Feeder schools: Meece Middle School; Hopkins Elementary School; Science Hill School (Note: Science Hill School is operated by the separate Science Hill Independent School District, which does not operate a high school. The Science Hill district has agreements in place that allow its high school students to attend any school in the Somerset or Pulaski County district. A 2015 Kentucky government report indicated that almost all Science Hill students then chose to attend Somerset High.)
- Information: +1 (606) 678-4721
- Athletic Director: Melissa Sheron
- Website: School site

Somerset High School is a public high school in Somerset, Kentucky, United States.

Somerset High School, with a student population of 509, is a comprehensive high school. Students may choose among four diploma programs including the Standard, Comprehensive, Scholar, and Carnegie Academy diplomas. Students who need to make up high school credits may attend the "Credit Recovery — program.", and students have access to the district alternative program. Students may also participate in a wide range of extracurricular classes and activities including band and working in the "Jumper Security" school bank. There are clubs including the National Honor Society and the Fellowship of Christian Athletes. Somerset High School has produced one United States Senator (Senator John Sherman Cooper) and several athletes who have played at the college and professional levels.

Extracurricular activities available at Somerset High School include Academic Team, Quick Recall, Future Problem Solving, Yearbook, National Honor Society, Football, Baseball, Archery, Cheerleading, Cross-Country, Basketball, Marching Band, Swimming, Golf, Tennis, Track, Softball, Soccer, E-Team, (Environmental, Energy, Education Team), DECA, FBLA, Police and Medical Explorers, Student Technology Leadership Program, Culture Club, Drama, the Young Filmmaker's Guild and the Pep Club. These are available to all students.

== Athletics ==
Somerset was one of the first schools in the state of Kentucky to field a football program, beginning play in 1907. The Briar Jumpers are one of the most successful programs in the state and a perennial small-school powerhouse. The school won numerous state and Southern titles, prior to the formation of KHSAA football, and a national championship in 1916. The school ranks among the top-10 in all-time wins in the state, toppling over 700 wins as of 2019. The Jumpers have won 21 district titles, 17 regional titles, 5 KHSAA state runner-ups: 1978, 1981, 1983, 1988, 2009 and one KHSAA state championship: 2019. The program has featured numerous high school and college all-Americans and members of the college football hall of fame.

Somerset has one state title in baseball, earned in 1974.
