= Science Hill, Kentucky =

- City
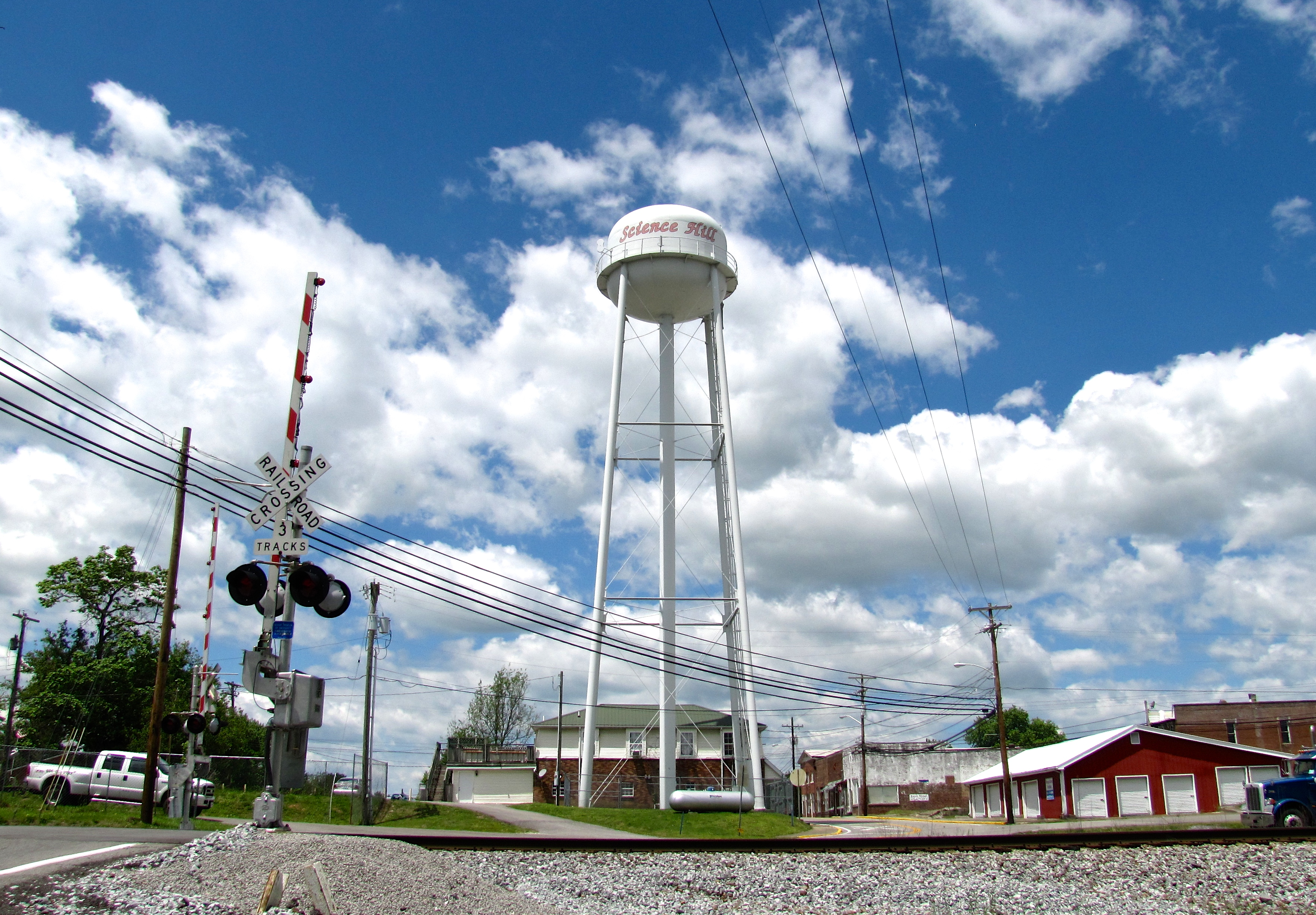
- Science Hill

- Location of Science Hill in Pulaski County, Kentucky.
- Coordinates: 37°10′27″N 84°37′58″W
- Country: United States
- State: Kentucky
- County: Pulaski
- Incorporated: 1882

Area
  - Total: 0.77 sq mi (1.99 km^{2})
  - Land: 0.76 sq mi (1.98 km^{2})
  - Water: 0 sq mi (0.00 km^{2})
- Elevation: 1,086 ft (331 m)

Population (2020)
  - Total: 657
  - Density: 857.8/sq mi (331.19/km^{2})
- Time zone: UTC-5 (Eastern (EST))
  - Summer (DST): UTC-4 (EDT)
- ZIP code: 42553
- Area code: 606
- FIPS code: 21-68952
- GNIS feature ID: 2405430
- Website: citysciencehill.com

Science Hill is a home rule-class city in Pulaski County, Kentucky, in the United States. As of the 2020 census, Science Hill had a population of 657.

== History ==
The community was named by geologist William J. Bobbitt, who visited to gather and analyze the local rocks, and applied to the local post office by William B. Gragg in 1874.

== Geography ==
According to the United States Census Bureau, the city has a total area of 0.6 square miles (1.6 km^{2}), all land. The city is concentrated atop a small hill along Kentucky Route 635. Kentucky Route 1247 passes through the city just east of its downtown area, and U.S. Route 27 passes along the city's eastern border. The Big Clifty Creek Valley lies just to the west of Science Hill.

== Demographics ==
Historical population
Census	Pop.	Note	%±
1910	257		—
1920	331		28.8%
1930	399		20.5%
1940	439		10.0%
1950	445		1.4%
1960	463		4.0%
1970	470		1.5%
1980	655		39.4%
1990	628		−4.1%
2000	634		1.0%
2010	693		9.3%
2020	657		−5.2%
U.S. Decennial Census

As of the census of 2000, there were 634 people, 249 households, and 184 families residing in the city. The population density was 1,013.0 inhabitants per square mile (391.1/km^{2}). There were 275 housing units at an average density of 439.4 per square mile (169.7/km^{2}). The racial makeup of the city was 99.21% White, 0.16% Native American, and 0.63% from two or more races. Hispanic or Latino of any race were 0.63% of the population.

There were 249 households, out of which 33.3% had children under the age of 18 living with them, 61.4% were married couples living together, 10.8% had a female householder with no husband present, and 26.1% were non-families. 23.3% of all households were made up of individuals, and 14.1% had someone living alone who was 65 years of age or older. The average household size was 2.55 and the average family size was 3.02.

In the city, the population was spread out, with 24.8% under the age of 18, 8.0% from 18 to 24, 27.0% from 25 to 44, 25.4% from 45 to 64, and 14.8% who were 65 years of age or older. The median age was 39 years. For every 100 females, there were 86.5 males. For every 100 females age 18 and over, there were 80.0 males.

The median income for a household in the city was $34,464, and the median income for a family was $43,125. Males had a median income of $27,917 versus $18,583 for females. The per capita income for the city was $14,476. About 11.2% of families and 15.6% of the population were below the poverty line, including 25.5% of those under age 18 and 9.0% of those age 65 or over.

== Education ==
The municipality is within Science Hill Independent School District for elementary and middle school and Pulaski County School District for high school only.

The Science Hill Independent School was founded in 1895. Since then it has moved several times to accommodate growth. The school enrolls students from pre-school up to the 8th grade. Since the school is independent, students graduating from Science Hill can choose either the county or Somerset City High Schools. Though the school has an enrollment of around 500, it consistently ranks among the highest-performing primary and elementary schools in the Commonwealth of Kentucky.

Science Hill has a lending library, a branch of the Pulaski County Public Library.

== In popular culture ==
Science Hill is referenced in the 2014 movie Edge of Tomorrow, as the hometown of Bill Paxton's character, Master Sergeant Farell. The main character asks Master Sergeant Farell the origin of Science Hill's name; Farell responds, "Never asked, don't care."
