= Waynesburg, Kentucky =

Unincorporated community in Kentucky, United States

- Unincorporated community
- Location within Kentucky Location within the United States
- Coordinates: 37°19′58″N 84°40′18″W
- Country: United States
- State: Kentucky
- County: Lincoln
- Elevation: 1,217 ft (371 m)
- Time zone: UTC-5 (Eastern (EST))
  - Summer (DST): UTC-4 (EDT)
- ZIP code: 40489
- Area code: 606
- GNIS feature ID: 506311

Waynesburg is an unincorporated community in southern Kentucky. Waynesburg is located Lincoln County, Kentucky along U.S. Route 27, Kentucky Route 328 and the Norfolk Southern Railway 18 miles (29 km) north of downtown Somerset. Waynesburg has a post office with ZIP code 40489.

== Climate ==
The climate in this area is characterized by hot, humid summers and generally mild to cool winters. According to the Köppen Climate Classification system, Waynesburg has a humid subtropical climate, abbreviated "Cfa" on climate maps.
