= Stanford, Kentucky =

- City
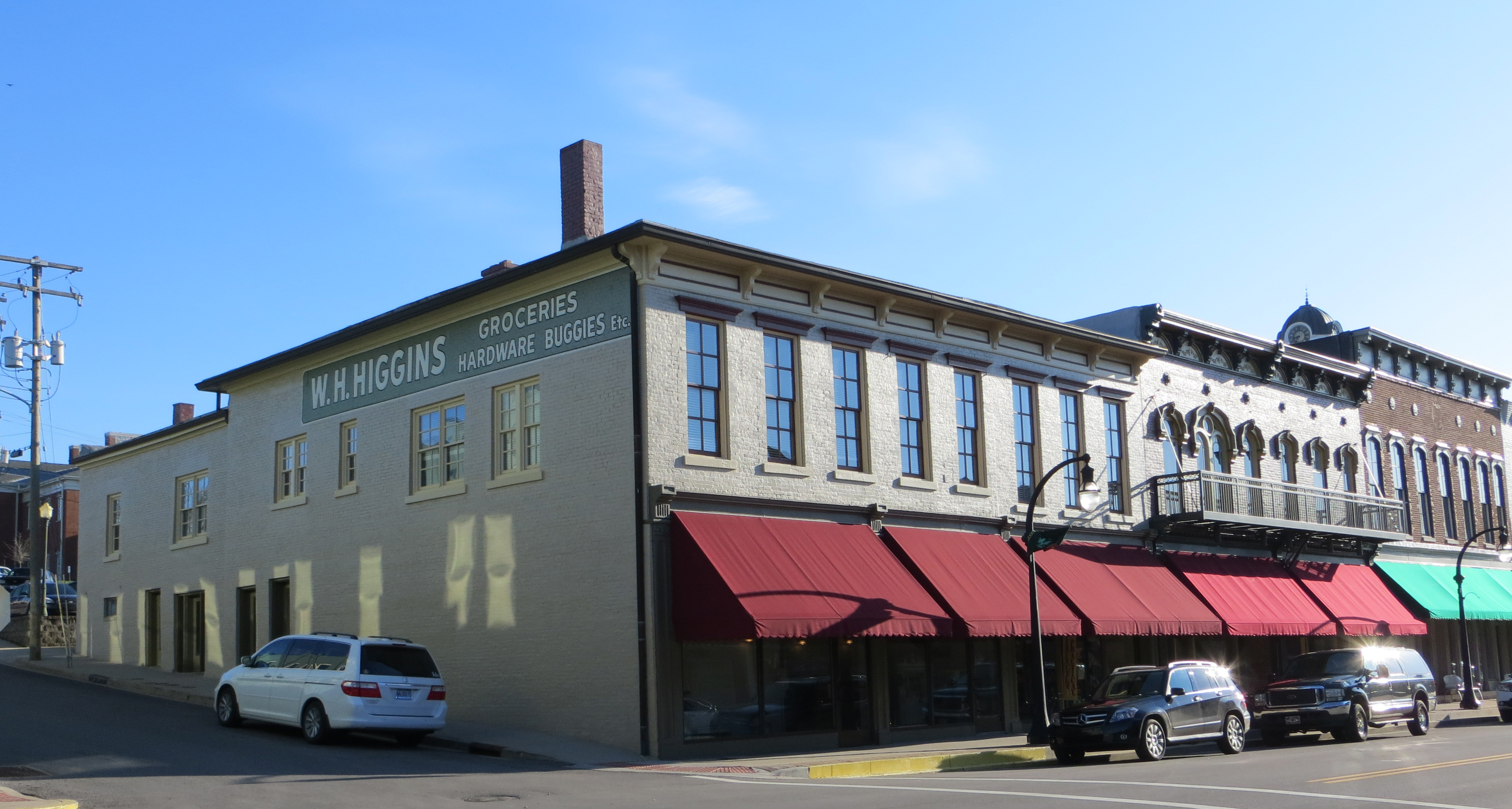
- Historic Commercial District

- Location in Lincoln County, Kentucky
- Coordinates: 37°31′53″N 84°39′24″W
- Country: United States
- State: Kentucky
- County: Lincoln
- Established: 1775

Area
  - Total: 4.47 sq mi (11.58 km^{2})
  - Land: 4.44 sq mi (11.49 km^{2})
  - Water: 0.035 sq mi (0.09 km^{2})
- Elevation: 935 ft (285 m)

Population (2020)
  - Total: 3,640
  - Estimate (2024): 3,702
  - Density: 820.6/sq mi (316.83/km^{2})
- Time zone: UTC-5 (Eastern (EST))
  - Summer (DST): UTC-4 (EDT)
- ZIP code: 40484
- Area code: 606
- FIPS code: 21-73110
- GNIS feature ID: 2405519
- Website: stanford.ky.gov

Stanford is a home rule-class city in Lincoln County, Kentucky, United States. It is one of the oldest settlements in Kentucky, having been founded in 1775. Its population was 3,487 at the 2010 census and an estimated 3,702 in 2024. It is the county seat of Lincoln County. Stanford is part of the Danville Micropolitan Statistical Area.

== History ==
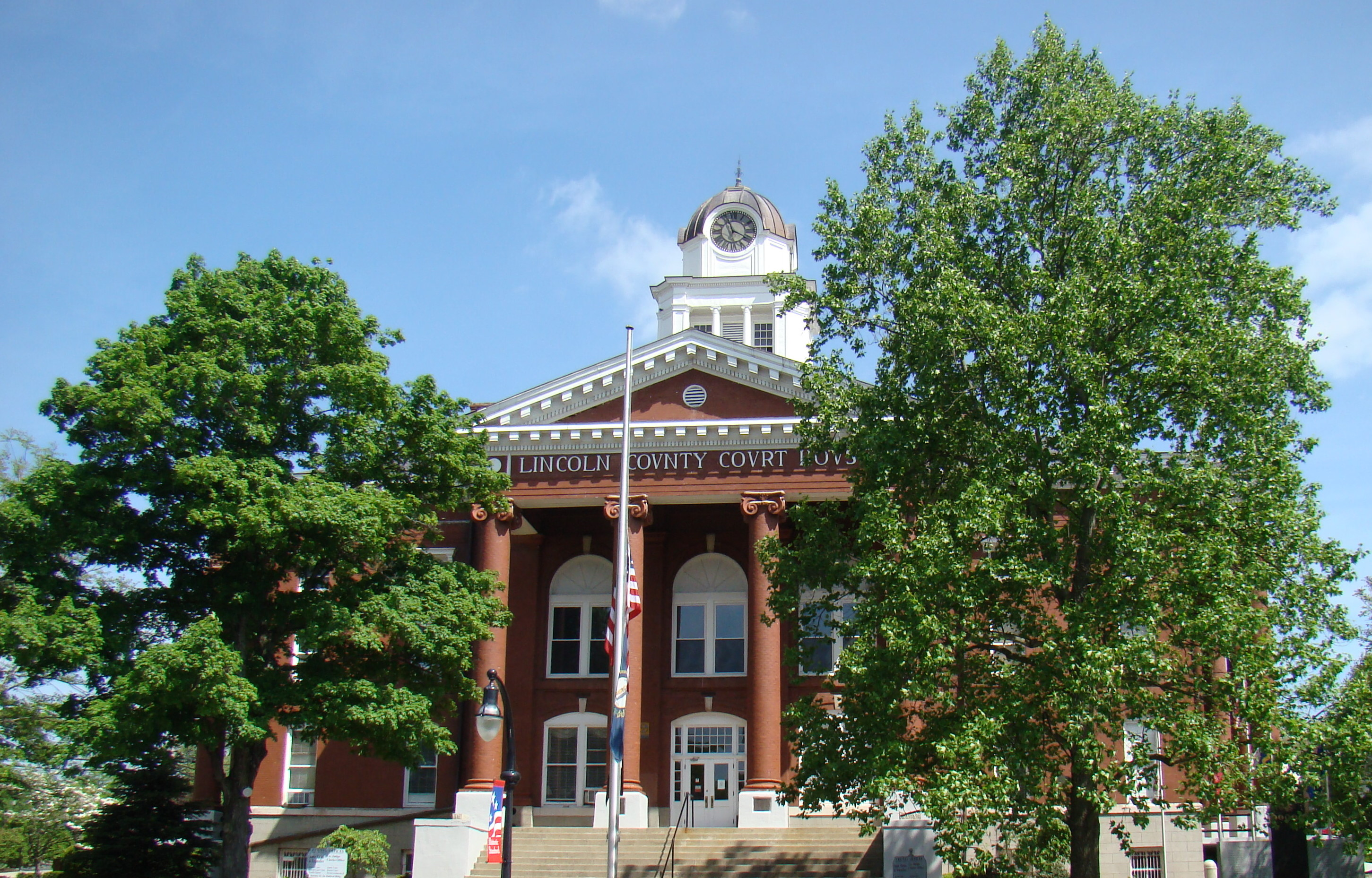
Lincoln County Courthouse

Stanford was founded in 1775 by Benjamin Logan as "St. Asaph"; the early settlement was also known simply as "Logan's Fort". The site of the fort is about one mile west of the courthouse at the center of town. The name "Fort Logan" is still used to this day by local businesses, including the Fort Logan Hospital and Standing Fort Collectibles. The main street was built on what was originally a buffalo trail.

The name "Stanford" may have come from "Standing Fort", a name given to Fort Logan because it survived multiple attacks by British-led Native Americans during the American Revolution. Alternately, it may have been named for Stamford, England. Although it was one of the smaller pioneer forts, it never fell to an attack.

In 1781, the original settlement expanded when Benjamin Logan donated part of his own land as the site for a courthouse. The county court continued to meet at Fort Harrod (now Harrodsburg) until 1785, when Mercer County was established. By 1786 Stanford had received its charter, making it one of the first towns in the former (1776–1780) Kentucky County, Virginia, with a formal charter. In 1787 the courthouse opened in a building made of logs. It has been expanded and upgraded over time, but the courthouse remains on the same site. Unlike most courthouses in Kentucky, it has never suffered from a fire or other major loss of records. Lincoln County has all its original records and archives dating from November 1789, making it one of the more complete archives in Kentucky. Among its original land deeds kept on vellum are deeds granting land to both Daniel Boone and Simon Kenton.

The first recorded church in Stanford was a Presbyterian church built in 1790, reflecting the staunch Presbyterian beliefs of the Logan family. The building still stands and is now part of the Harvey Helm Memorial Historic Library and Museum on Main Street. Other denominations, including Baptist and Methodist, were not established in the area until the 1830s. The current Presbyterian Church in Stanford has stood on the same site since around 1850.

A small local library was first established in the 1830s. The library was renamed in 1970 in honor of Harvey Helm, a native son who became a Kentucky statesman and member of the United States House of Representatives between 1909 and 1917.

The first school was built sometime in the 1850s, as the Male Academy. It was established in a building that is now the Fox Funeral Home on West Main Street. The corresponding Female Academy was built in the 1870s. The Stanford School was founded in 1900, and after much expansion, still serves, now as the Lincoln County Student Support Center.

Largely untouched by the American Civil War (the nearest conflict was the Battle of Perryville, 20 miles (32 km) away), Stanford grew significantly in the post-war period. In the late 1860s, the town gained its own newspaper, the Stanford Banner, which is still publishing as the Interior Journal. The city continued to grow, especially after the Louisville and Nashville Railroad built a station and line into the town in late 1865. Now the railroad line has closed, and the tracks were removed in 1988, leaving only a small spur line that connects to Mount Vernon, 24 miles (39 km) to the southeast. However, the railway depot has been restored, and Stanford is notable as the location of the first automobile garage in Kentucky, which opened in 1905.

== Geography ==
Stanford is located in south-central Kentucky in the southernmost extent of the Bluegrass region along the Southern Knobs in northern Lincoln County. U.S. Route 27 passes through the east side of the city, leading northeast 8 miles (13 km) to Lancaster and 43 miles (69 km) to Lexington, and south 32 miles (51 km) to Somerset. U.S. Route 150 passes through the northern side of the city, leading northwest 10 miles (16 km) to Danville and southeast 24 miles (39 km) to Mount Vernon.

According to the United States Census Bureau, Stanford has a total area of 4.2 square miles (10.8 km^{2}), of which 0.04 square miles (0.1 km^{2}), or 0.85%, are water.

== Demographics ==
Historical population
Census	Pop.	Note	%±
1800	66		—
1830	363		—
1840	263		−27.5%
1860	479		—
1870	752		57.0%
1880	1,213		61.3%
1890	1,385		14.2%
1900	1,651		19.2%
1910	1,532		−7.2%
1920	1,397		−8.8%
1930	1,544		10.5%
1940	1,940		25.6%
1950	1,861		−4.1%
1960	2,019		8.5%
1970	2,474		22.5%
1980	2,764		11.7%
1990	2,686		−2.8%
2000	3,430		27.7%
2010	3,487		1.7%
2020	3,640		4.4%
2024 (est.)	3,702		1.7%
U.S. Decennial Census

=== 2020 census ===
As of the 2020 census, Stanford had a population of 3,640. The median age was 43.2 years. 21.2% of residents were under the age of 18 and 22.3% of residents were 65 years of age or older. For every 100 females there were 87.7 males, and for every 100 females age 18 and over there were 83.0 males age 18 and over.

0.0% of residents lived in urban areas, while 100.0% lived in rural areas.

There were 1,525 households in Stanford, of which 27.5% had children under the age of 18 living in them. Of all households, 38.2% were married-couple households, 15.6% were households with a male householder and no spouse or partner present, and 39.0% were households with a female householder and no spouse or partner present. About 35.5% of all households were made up of individuals and 17.9% had someone living alone who was 65 years of age or older.

There were 1,690 housing units, of which 9.8% were vacant. The homeowner vacancy rate was 2.7% and the rental vacancy rate was 8.7%.

Racial composition as of the 2020 census
Race	Number	Percent
White	3,217	88.4%
Black or African American	213	5.9%
American Indian and Alaska Native	5	0.1%
Asian	16	0.4%
Native Hawaiian and Other Pacific Islander	1	0.0%
Some other race	41	1.1%
Two or more races	147	4.0%
Hispanic or Latino (of any race)	100	2.7%

=== 2000 census ===
As of the 2000 census, there were 3,430 people, 1,417 households, and 919 families residing in the city. The population density was 1,114.5 per square mile (430.3/km^{2}). There were 1,522 housing units at an average density of 494.6 per square mile (191.0/km^{2}). The racial makeup of the city was 89.97% White, 8.10% African American, 0.09% Native American, 0.09% Asian, 0.20% from other races, and 1.55% from two or more races. Hispanic or Latino of any race were 1.37% of the population.

There were 1,417 households, out of which 29.6% had children under the age of 18 living with them, 46.1% were married couples living together, 15.9% had a female householder with no husband present, and 35.1% were non-families. 31.8% of all households were made up of individuals, and 15.2% had someone living alone who was 65 years of age or older. The average household size was 2.27 and the average family size was 2.85.

22.8% of the population was under the age of 18, 8.3% from 18 to 24, 28.5% from 25 to 44, 22.1% from 45 to 64, and 18.4% who were 65 years of age or older. The median age was 38 years. For every 100 females, there were 84.1 males. For every 100 females age 18 and over, there were 79.7 males.

The median income for a household in the city was $25,087, and the median income for a family was $32,550. Males had a median income of $28,583 versus $20,975 for females. The per capita income for the city was $13,811. About 15.9% of families and 20.6% of the population were below the poverty line, including 27.4% of those under age 18 and 27.8% of those age 65 or over.

== Education ==
Stanford has a lending library, the Lincoln County Public Library.

== Notable people ==
- Marv Foley, baseball player
- Anthony Gale, commandant of the United States Marine Corps
- Basil Hayden, All-American athlete and collegiate basketball coach
- Harvey Helm, congressman and statesman
- Laura Kirkpatrick, the runner-up of the thirteenth cycle of America's Next Top Model
- California Joe Milner, miner and frontier scout
- Lovell Rousseau, Union Army Major General of Volunteers, congressman
- Richard C. Saufley, naval aviation pioneer
- William Lewis Sublette, fur trapper, pioneer, and mountain man, who along with his five brothers after 1823 became agents of the Rocky Mountain Fur Company (and later one of its owners)
- William Whitley, early pioneer
- Thomas J. Wright, artist and filmmaker, known for his work on the television series Night Gallery
