= National Register of Historic Places listings in Wayne County, Kentucky =

Location of Wayne County in Kentucky

This is a list of the National Register of Historic Places listings in Wayne County, Kentucky.

It is intended to be a complete list of the properties on the National Register of Historic Places in Wayne County, Kentucky, United States. The locations of National Register properties for which the latitude and longitude coordinates are included below, may be seen in a map.

There are 9 properties listed on the National Register in the county, 1 of which is a National Historic Landmark.

This National Park Service list is complete through NPS recent listings posted August 28, 2026.

== Current listings ==
	Name on the Register	Image	Date listed	Location	City or town	Description
1	Adkins-Hurt Mill		May 6, 1977 (#77000662)	Off Kentucky Route 167; 36°39′06″N 84°48′16″W	Mount Pisgah	
2	Battle of Mill Springs Historic Areas	Battle of Mill Springs Historic Areas	February 18, 1993 (#93000001)	Three discontiguous areas: one south of Nancy, one in Mill Springs, and one to the north across the Cumberland River; 36°55′29″N 84°46′47″W	Mill Springs	
3	Dunagan's Store		August 31, 2026 (#100013340)	1748 Old Mill Springs Road; 36°55′57″N 84°46′45″W	Monticello vicinity	
4	Fairchild House	Fairchild House	March 25, 2008 (#08000215)	302 S. Main St. 36°49′33″N 84°51′09″W	Monticello	
5	Hotel Breeding	Hotel Breeding	August 25, 1988 (#88001315)	201-211 N. Main St. 36°49′50″N 84°50′55″W	Monticello	
6	Mill Springs Mill	Mill Springs Mill	April 11, 1973 (#73000858)	Off Kentucky Route 90; 36°56′03″N 84°46′44″W	Mill Springs	
7	Monticello Historic Commercial District		October 29, 1982 (#82001577)	Main and Columbia Sts. 36°49′46″N 84°50′57″W	Monticello	Historic district with 11 contributing buildings.
8	Wayne County High School	Wayne County High School	July 30, 2013 (#13000567)	80 A.J. Lloyd Cir. 36°49′28″N 84°51′41″W	Monticello	
9	West-Metcalfe House		November 17, 1977 (#77000661)	1.75 miles south of Mill Springs off Kentucky Route 90; 36°55′10″N 84°46′39″W	Mill Springs	

== See also ==
- List of National Historic Landmarks in Kentucky
- National Register of Historic Places listings in Kentucky
