= Rocky Branch =

Rocky Branch or Rockybranch may refer to:

Streams

- Rocky Branch (Kennedy Creek tributary), a stream in Kentucky
- Rocky Branch (Burris Fork tributary), a stream in Missouri
- Rocky Branch (Mineral Fork tributary), a stream in Missouri
- Rocky Branch (Panther Creek tributary), a stream in Missouri
- Rocky Branch (New Hampshire), a stream in New Hampshire
- Rocky Branch (Lanes Creek tributary), a stream in Anson County, North Carolina
- Rocky Branch (Deep River tributary), a stream in Chatham County, North Carolina
- Rocky Branch (Reedy Fork tributary), a stream in Guilford County, North Carolina

Populated places

- Rockybranch, Kentucky, an unincorporated community

Education

- Rocky Branch School, Arkansas
