= Wayne County High School =

Wayne County High School may refer to any of the following United States educational institutions:

- Wayne County High School (Georgia) in Jesup, Georgia
- Wayne County High School (Kentucky) in Monticello, Kentucky
- Wayne County High School (Mississippi) in Waynesboro, Mississippi
- Wayne County High School (Tennessee) in Waynesboro, Tennessee
- Wayne County High School (Utah) in Bicknell, Utah

== See also ==
- Wayne High School (disambiguation)
