= Monticello High School =

Monticello High School may refer to:

- Monticello High School (Arkansas), Monticello, Arkansas
- Monticello High School (Florida), Monticello, Florida
- Monticello High School (Georgia), Monticello, Georgia
- Monticello High School (Illinois), Monticello, Illinois
- Monticello High School (Indiana), Monticello, Indiana
- Monticello High School (Iowa), Monticello, Iowa
- Monticello High School (Louisiana), East Carroll Parish, Louisiana
- Monticello High School (Minnesota), Monticello, Minnesota
- Monticello High School (New York), Monticello, New York
- Monticello High School (Utah), Monticello, Utah
- Monticello High School (Virginia), Albemarle County, Virginia
- Monticello High School (Wisconsin), Monticello, Wisconsin
- The high school component of Monticello Independent Schools in Monticello, Kentucky, a K-12 facility that houses all grades under one roof
