= Rock Branch =

Rock Branch may refer to:

- Rock Branch, Georgia, an unincorporated community
- Rock Branch, Iowa, an unincorporated community
- Rock Branch (Camp Creek), a stream in Missouri
- Rock Branch (Huzzah Creek), a stream in Missouri
- Rock Branch (Haw River tributary), a stream in Guilford County, North Carolina
- Rock Branch (Fivemile Creek), a stream in Oklahoma and Missouri

== See also ==
- Rocky Branch (disambiguation)
