= Angel food cake =

Type of sponge cake

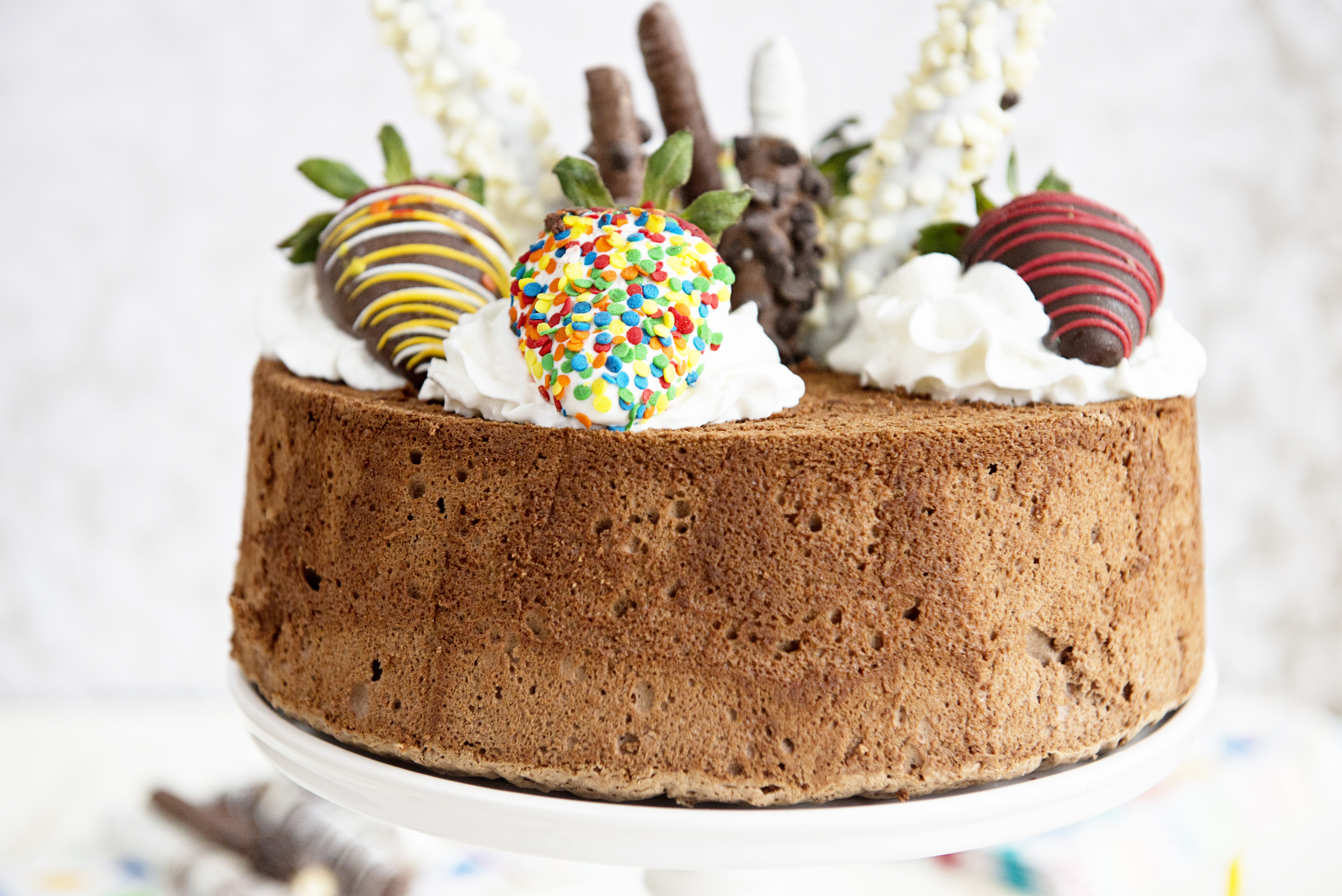
- Chocolate angel food cake
- Type: Sponge cake
- Place of origin: United States
- Main ingredients: Sugar, flour, egg whites, cream of tartar

Angel food cake or angel cake is a type of sponge cake made with egg whites, sugar, and flour, and without oil, baking powder, and various other ingredients common in cakes. It is made in a process of whipping egg whites to a foam, beating in sugar, and folding in flour and more sugar. After baking in a pan with a tube in its center, the cake is hung upside down until cool. The final cake has a slightly chewy texture and white interior.

Apart from the three basic ingredients, salt and vanilla are often featured, as is cream of tartar, which lends stability, a softer crumb, and a lighter color. In more complex preparations, inclusions and flavorings such as chocolate, spices, and citrus flavors are added. Angel food cake is often served with a sauce or glaze.

Angel food cake originated in the United States in the 19th century. Gaining popularity and its name in the 1870s, angel food cakes developed over the next century. By the 1930s, the technique of folding in half the sugar had become standard, and less air was incorporated into the eggs. From that decade, angel food cake variants with flavors including maraschino cherries, peppermint, and crushed canned pineapple began to be produced.

== Ingredients ==
Angel food cake is a light sponge cake, a rare American dessert with few ingredients. In a simple angel food cake, egg whites, sugar, and flour are combined in a 3:3:1 ratio by weight, along with salt, cream of tartar, and a flavoring (typically vanilla). Ingredients common in cakes such as egg yolks, baking powder, butter, and inclusions such as nuts and chocolate are excluded. Some bakers use powdered sugar over granulated, saying angel food cakes produced with more fine sugars have a more tender crumb. (Note: In his assessment of whether this is true, baker Greg Patent comments: "Maybe yes and maybe no.") More complex angel food cake preparations may include flavorings such as spices, citrus flavors and chocolate.

Fresh egg whites, cream of tartar, and pastry flour give angel food cake a soft crumb, with cream of tartar lowering density, creating a lighter cake. Using fresh egg whites over those a few days old also impacts the final cake's crumb density, producing a tighter final product. The ultimate characteristics, however, of angel food cakes produced with these ingredients vary, which can be undesirable for manufacturers producing the cake on an industrial level. To generate a more consistent output, some manufacturers use monocalcium phosphate monohydrate (MCP) in place of cream of tartar.

== Preparation ==
In a basic preparation, room temperature egg whites are whisked until foamy, and then stabilized with cream of tartar. Continuing to whisk, sugar is added one spoonful at a time until the mixture forms soft peaks and the egg whites can hold no more sugar. Remaining sugar is sifted into flour, and the two are folded into the egg mixture. Among bakers, this step is responsible for a perception that angel food cake is a difficult cake, as overmixing here will collapse the air worked into the batter. This is not the only process by which the batter can lose its air; flavorings based on essential oils can cause a collapse, along with the oil-contamination of bowls or utensils, as warned against by many recipe writers.

The cake is baked in an ungreased tube pan, which facilitates heat transfer and prevents cake movement along the sides of the container during baking. Before and during the process, bakers take precautions to prevent the cake from collapsing. One of these is to avoid whisking egg whites and sugar to stiff peaks; if so much air is incorporated that the mixture can hold no more, the expanding bubbles in the hot oven can break apart egg protein chains. Placing batter in the cold oven before heating it up is another technique used by some bakers, as the bubbles expand more slowly, allowing the proteins more time to set. During the last minutes in the oven and throughout cooling, the cake shrinks slightly—by including cream of tartar, such shrinkage is minimized.

After baking, angel food cake is hung upside down for several hours until cool, and placed to allow air to flow over the cake's surface. Angel food cake tins are designed to facilitate this, featuring small feet that protrude from the top of the pan. Through hanging, the shape of the air bubbles are preserved, and the cake's stretched interior takes on a lighter appearance. Hanging the cake upside down generally does not pose problems for bakers, although in kitchens below 68 °F (20 °C), cooling angel food cakes can contract and fall from their pan before they have completely set. Other factors of preparation impact how the final cake will turn out. For instance, those cooked at lower altitudes are less fragile, but have a less tender crumb.

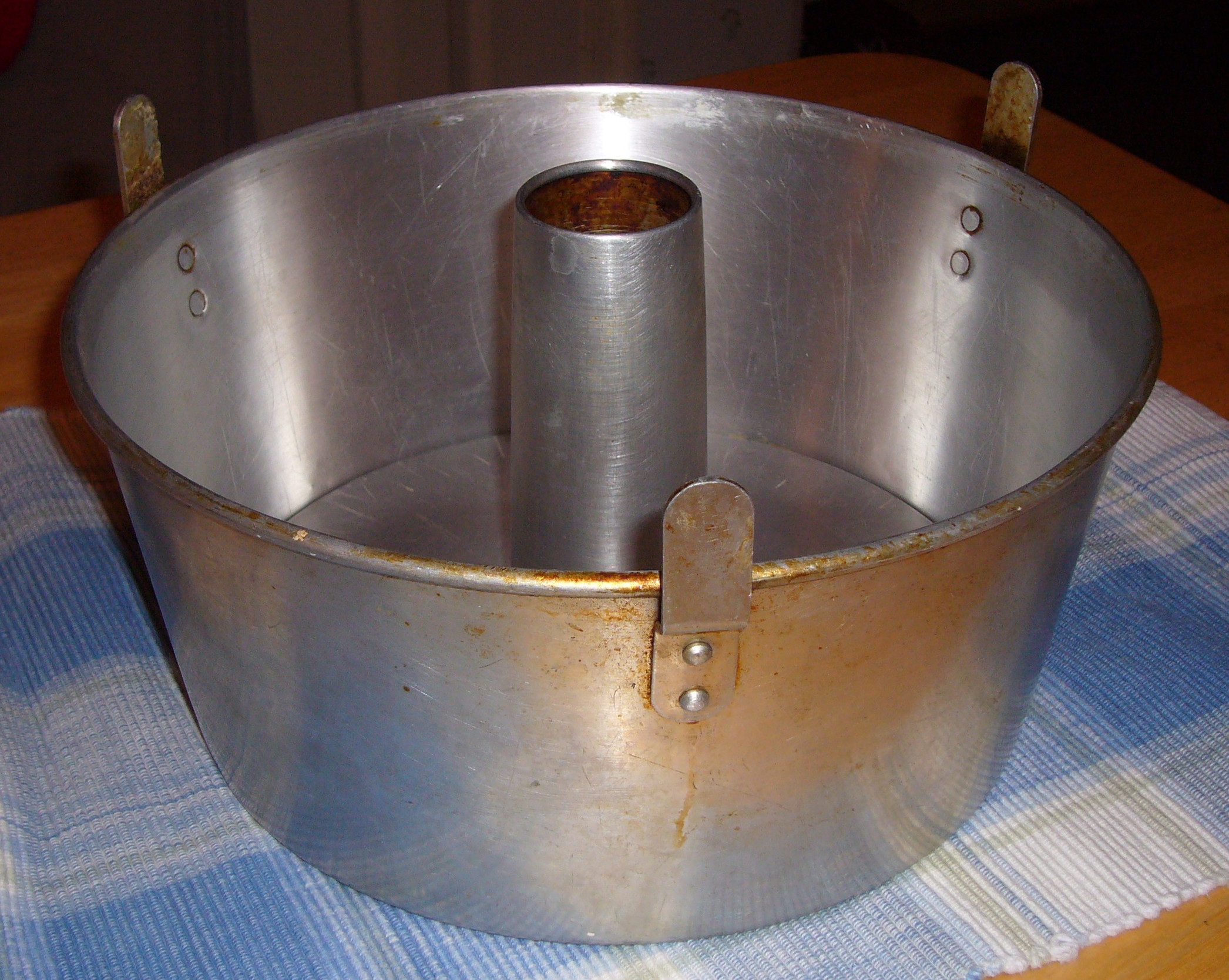
Angel food cake tube pan

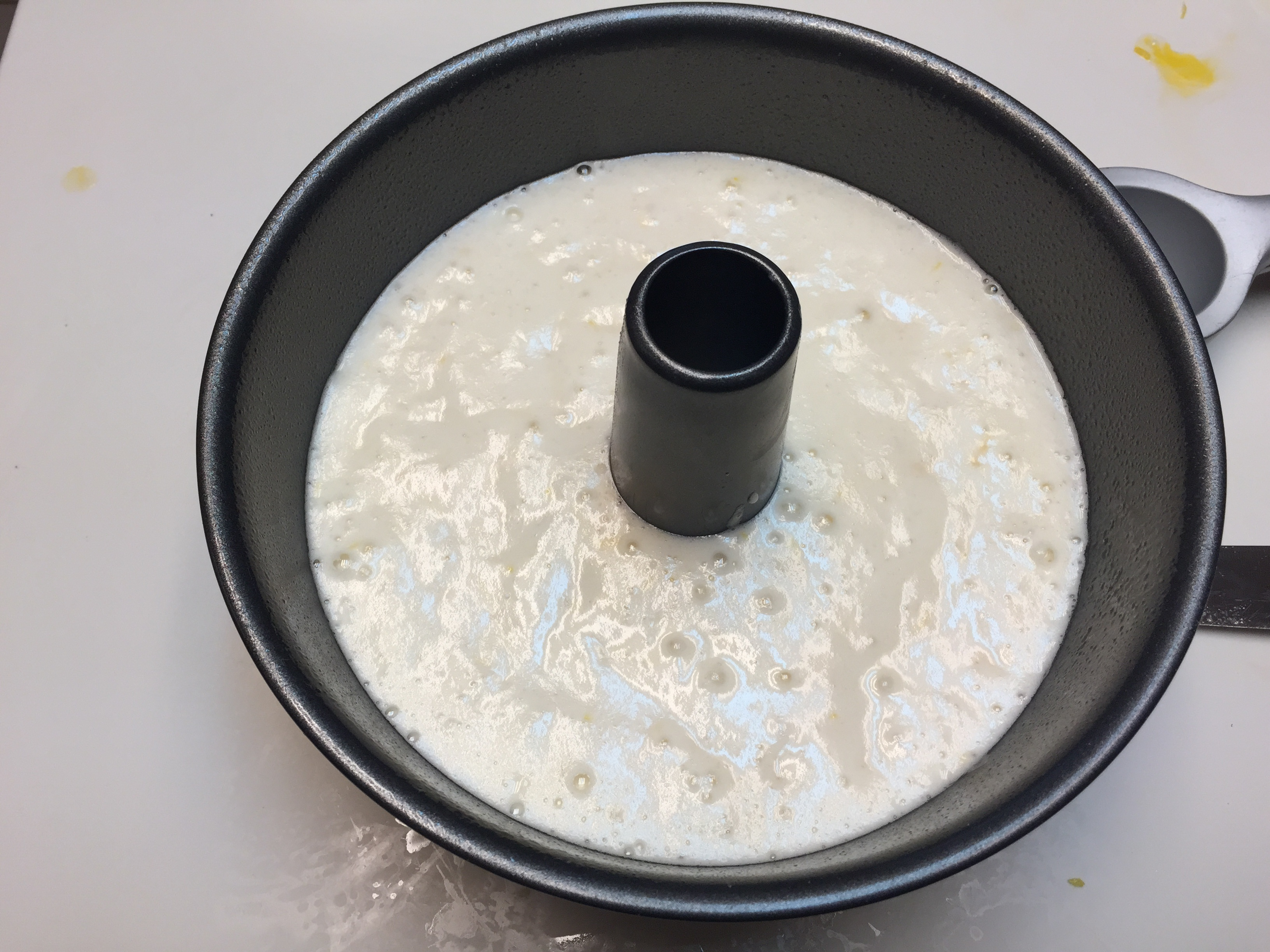
Batter

Baking in oven timelapse

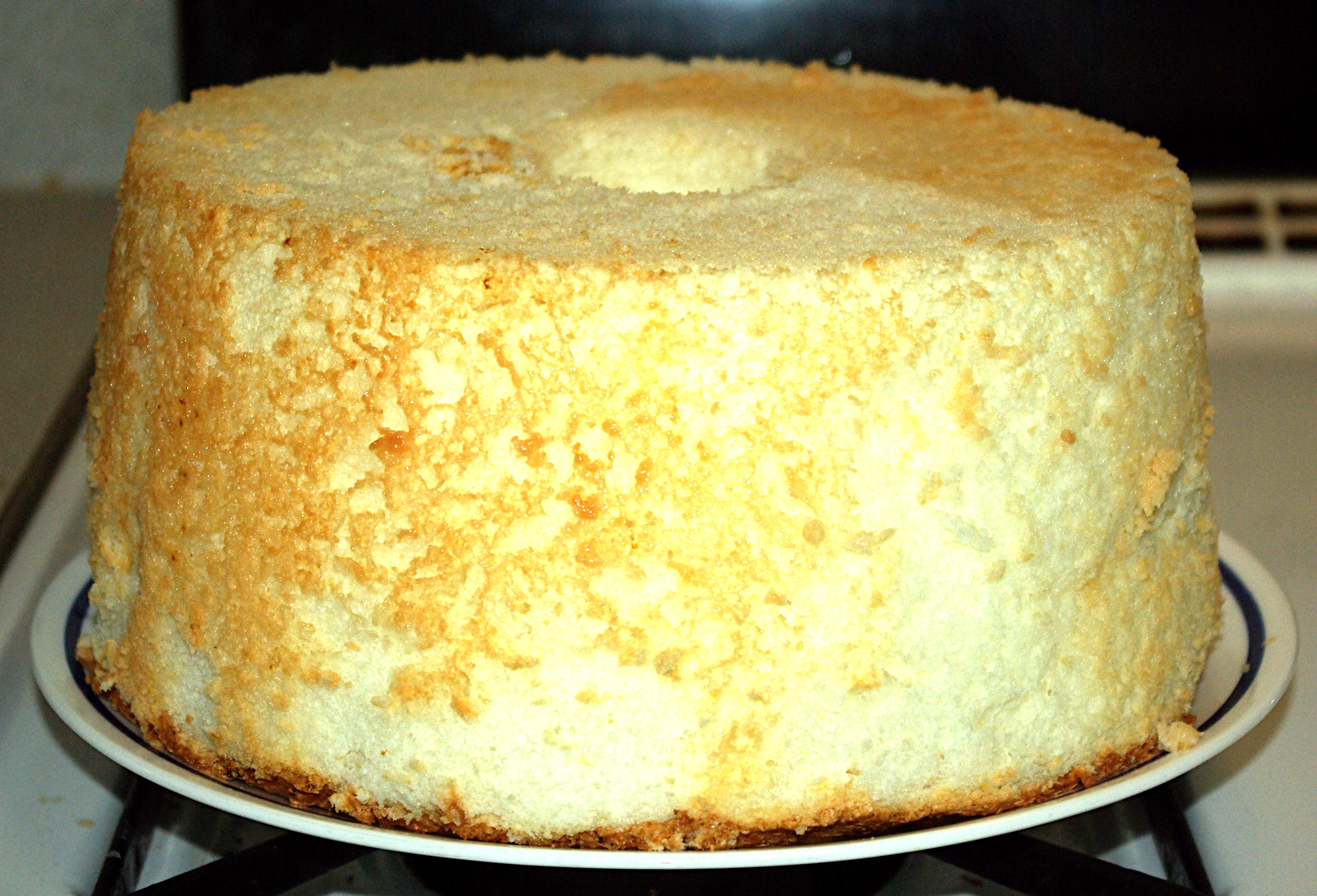
Final product

== Serving ==
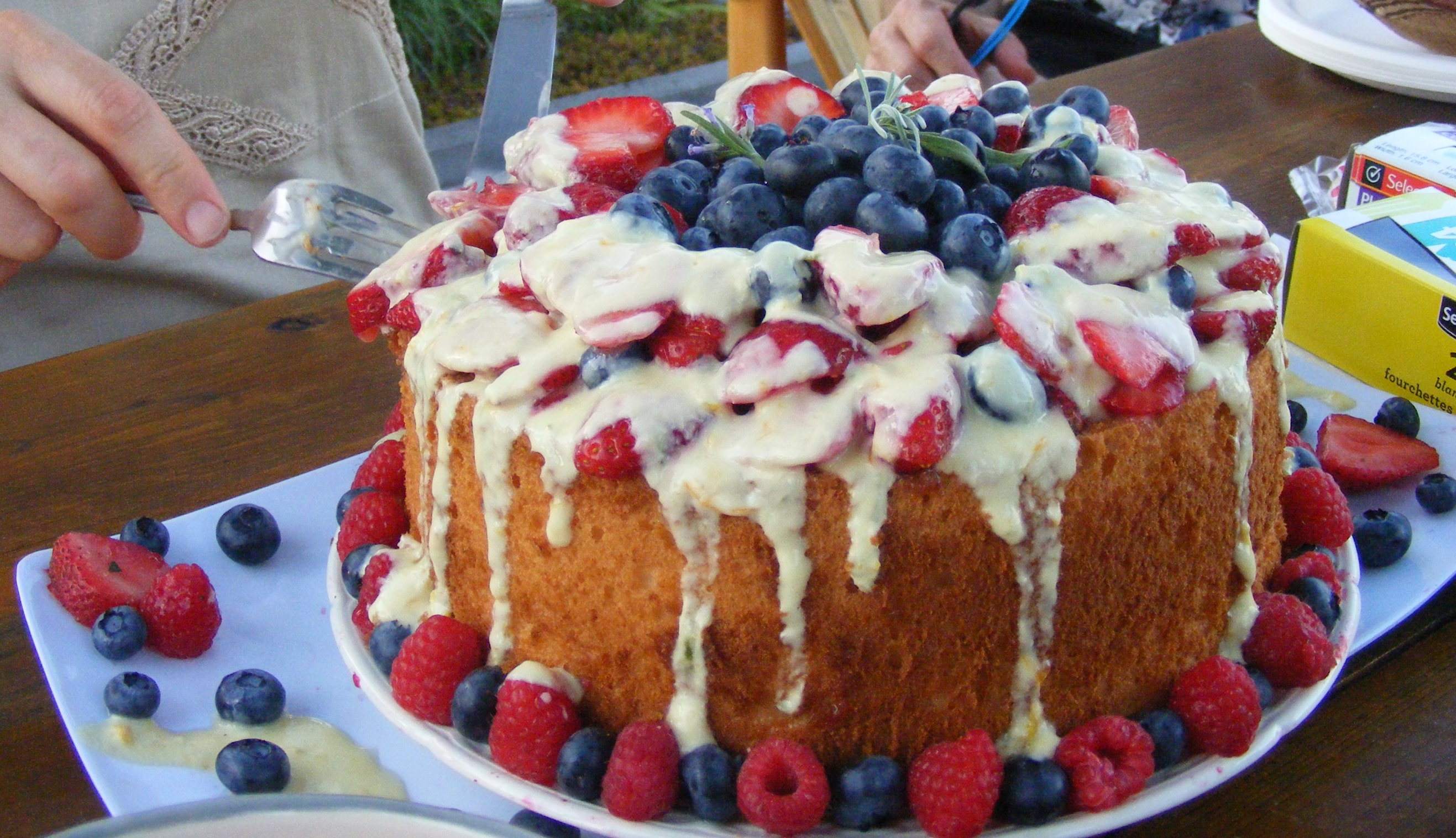
An angel food cake with various toppings and frosting

The resulting cake has a white interior, partly due to the inclusion of cream of tartar, and a slightly chewy texture. In some servings, it is glazed, iced, or served with a sauce. The dish's reference to angels has given it a special association in some communities. Among African Americans, the cake is often served at funeral receptions to suggest that the deceased person lives in heaven among the angels. Among the Pennsylvania Dutch, it is considered a wedding cake, and the couple is said to be blessed by angels.

== History ==
In American folk lore, it is said that angel food cake was created by frugal Pennsylvania Dutch cooks in an effort to avoid wasting egg whites left over from making noodles.

=== Early ===
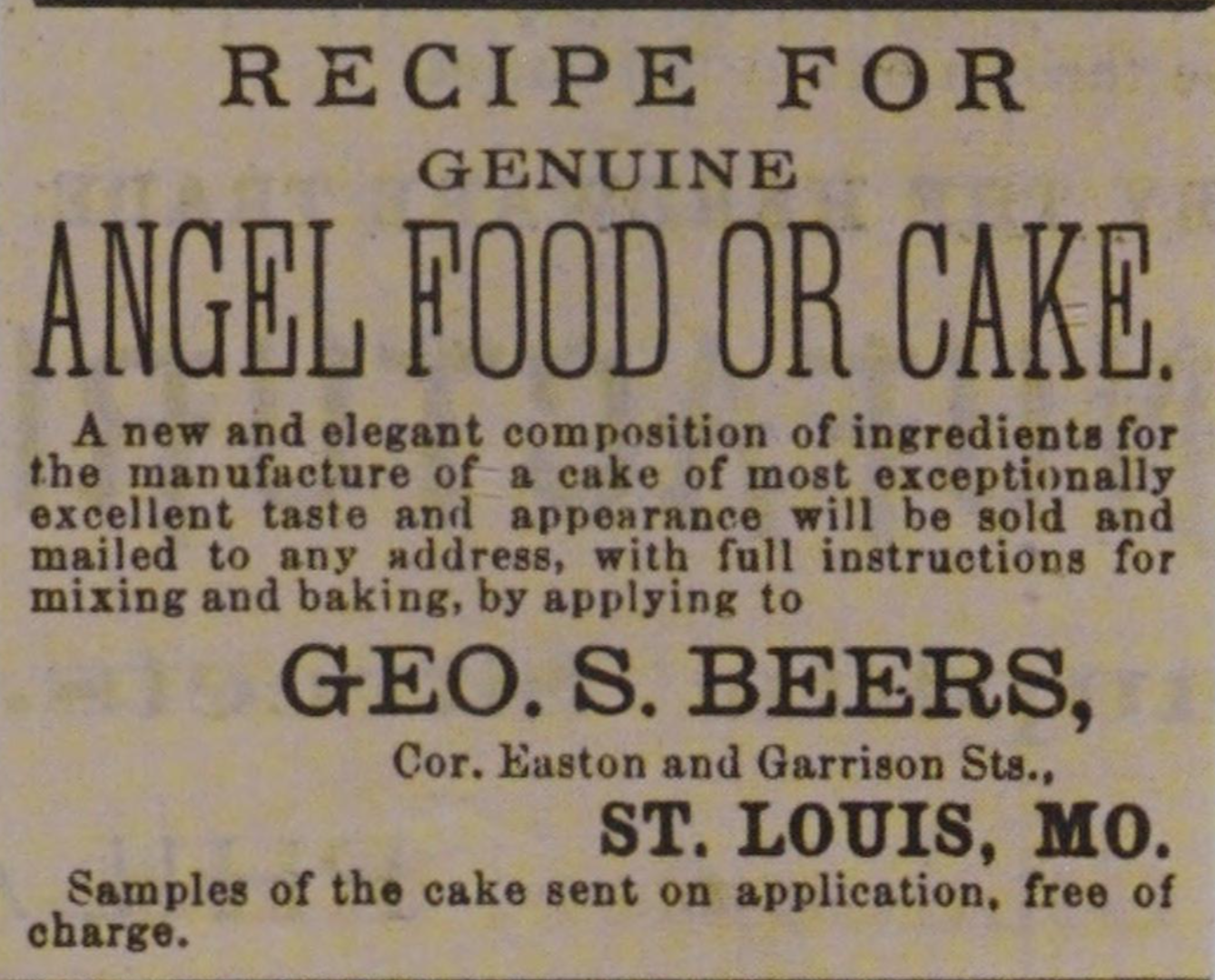
Early advertisement for angel's food cake recipes

Sponge cakes originated in Europe in the 1600s, but it was not until 1839 with the publication of Lettice Bryan's The Kentucky Housewife that an American version emerged. Unlike its European counterpart, Bryan's "White Sponge" lacked egg yolks, gaining a soft texture from a high sugar content, and maintaining its shape through the citric acid-content of lemon and orange juice that were whisked through a meringue.

White sponge gained popularity in the 1860s and 1870s after the 1864 publication of The Practical Cook Book, which removed ingredients from earlier sponge cakes until only sugar, flour, and egg whites remained. On top of this basic recipe, cooks sometimes added flavor and stability with almond extract and cream of tartar. According to the food historian Stephen Schmidt's writing in The Oxford Encyclopedia of Food and Drink in America, it is here, with the creation of cakes with greater volume and lighter consistency where the modern angel food cake became distinct from the earlier white sponge. William Woys Weaver gives an earlier date, saying the angel food cake emerged among the Pennsylvania Dutch in the 1850s. Sponges gained further popularity after 1870 when the rotary egg beater was invented, reducing how much time and effort was needed.

Sources differ on how cookbook authors had used "angel's food" as a descriptor to this point. Food writer Stella Parks writes that it was used to characterize sweet dishes as having a wholesome quality, with the phrase derived from a use in the 16th century Book of Common Prayer, referencing the biblical manna. Schmidt writes that desserts labeled "angel food" were frozen mousses made from egg whites and whipped cream, along with other, similar dishes. The first use of "angels' food" to reference the cake identified by Parks came in The Home Messenger, a cookbook published in 1878 in Detroit, Michigan. In 1884, a recipe was published by Mary Johnson Bailey Lincoln in her Boston Cook Book, after which the cake gained wide popularity. The appearance of angel food cake in cookbooks of the northern US represented an inversion of recipes for the white sponge, which had been the domain of southern cookbooks. The cake's appearance came in some of the last years of American cake cookery before the mass uptake of baking powder.

=== 20th and 21st centuries ===
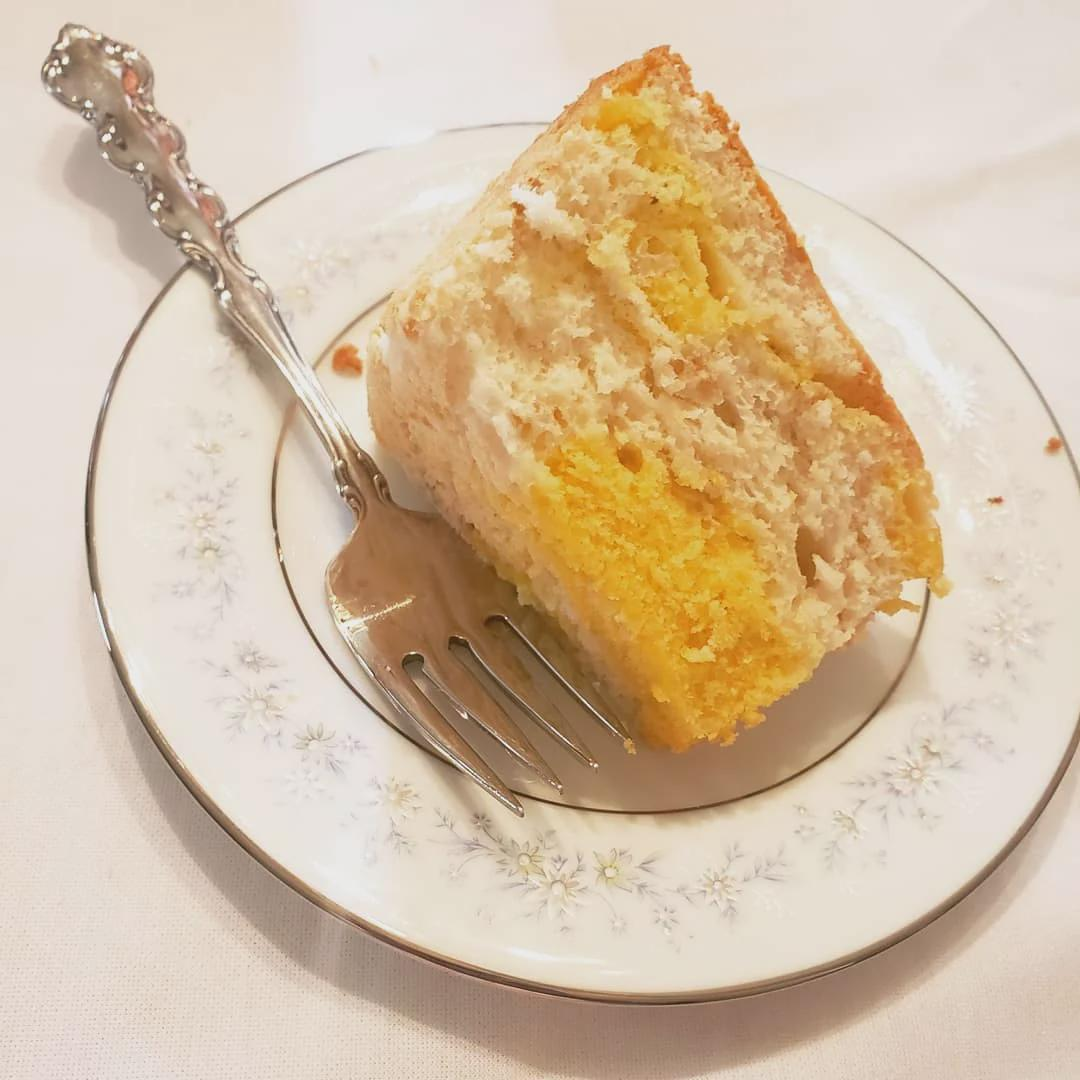
Daffodil cake

By the 1930s, through the work of researchers, preparation methods had changed. Egg whites were no longer whisked to stiff peaks after it was found that incorporating less air produced a more tender and moist cake, and instead of trying to whisk all of the sugar into egg whites, recipes changed to fold half of it in with the flour. Recipes appeared in cookbooks, including those targeting African-American audiences, and variants rolled out, the earliest being chocolate, prune, and maraschino cherry, later followed by cakes including peppermint, butterscotch, spices, and chocolate chips. Despite these developments, the mechanics of what was happening on a chemical and molecular level in preparation were not understood, and over the next few decades, scientists undertook research into the cakes. By 1962, the angel food cake had been so intensly researched that cookbook illustrator Marion Becker felt compelled to assert "laboratory research" had "become so elaborate as to intimidate the housewife."

Other variants that came about in the 1930s included the daffodil cake, named for the streaks of yellow running through the classic angel food cake. Emerging in the Great Depression, it offered cooks a way of using extra egg yolks. Layer cake versions of the angel food cake divided with whipped-cream gelatin fillings also arrived, made to be eaten at parties. In the following decade, the American food corporation General Mills began to promote the chiffon cake, understood by consumers to be more accessible to those who struggled to make angel food cakes. Simultaneously, angel food party cakes evolved, moving the whipped cream to a hollowed out cavity and a coating for the exterior, and in the following decades, the interior filling was swapped for ice cream or a maraschino cherry-marshmallow-nut spread, sometimes extended with coconut and crushed, canned pineapple.

At the 1990s and 2000s, angel food cakes maintained a reputation as healthy due to their low fat content. This did not necessarily translate into popularity, however. In an article published in The Washington Post in 1990, Shirley Corriher was quoted as saying "Angel-food cake is simply not in"; with diners reported as preferring more rich desserts if they were choosing to eat sugary treats. At the turn of the 21st century, this had changed, with their healthy reputation a source of popularity. Filled, party versions continued to be made, which were often filled with strawberries and chocolate Bavarian cream.

== See also ==
- Devil's food cake
- List of American desserts
- List of cakes

== Sources ==
=== Books ===
- Castella, Krystina (2012). World of Cake: 150 Recipes for Sweet Traditions from Cultures Near and Far. Storey Publishing. ISBN 978-1-603-42446-2.
- Fehribach, Paul (2023). Midwestern Food: A Chef's Guide to the Surprising History of a Great American Cuisine, with More Than 100 Tasty Recipes. University of Chicago Press. ISBN 978-0-226-81949-5.
- Figoni, Paula (2011). How Baking Works: Exploring the Fundamentals of Baking Science. Hoboken, New Jersey: John Wiley & Sons. ISBN 978-0-470-39267-6.
- Parks, Stella (2017). BraveTart: Iconic American Desserts. W. W. Norton & Company. ISBN 978-0-393-63427-3.
- Patent, Greg (2002). Baking in America: Traditional and Contemporary Favorites From the Past 200 Yeares. Boston & New York: Houghton Mifflin Company. ISBN 0-618-04831-6.
- Patent, Greg (2015). "Angel Food Cake". In Goldstein, Darra (ed.). The Oxford Companion to Sugar and Sweets. Oxford University Press. ISBN 978-0-19-931339-6.
- Smith, Andrew F., ed. (2013). The Oxford Encyclopedia of Food and Drink in America (2nd ed.). New York: Oxford University Press. ISBN 978-0-19-973496-2.
  - Schmidt, Stephen (2013a). "Cake: Overview". In Smith (2013).
  - Schmidt, Stephen (2013b). "Cake: Angel Food Cake". In Smith (2013).
- Stewart, Isabella Graham Duffield; Sill, Sally B.; Duffield, Mary B. (1878). The Home Messenger Book of Tested Receipts. Home messenger receipt book. Detroit: E.B. Smith & Company, Detroit.
- Suas, Michel (2009). Advanced Bread and Pastry: A Professional Approach. Clifton Park, New York: Delamar Cengage Group. ISBN 978-1-4180-1169-7.
- Tipton-Martin, Toni (2019). Jubilee: Recipes from Two Centuries of African American Cooking. New York: Clarkson Potter. ISBN 978-1-524-76173-8.

=== Journal articles ===
- Foegeding, E Allen; Luck, P J; Davis, J P (2006). "Factors determining the physical properties of protein foams". Food Hydrocolloids. 20. doi:10.1016/j.foodhyd.2005.03.014.
- Patent, Greg (Summer 2013). "Angel Food Cake: Just Heavenly!". Gastronomica. 13 (2). doi:10.1525/gfc.2013.13.2.9. JSTOR 10.1525/gfc.2013.13.2.9.

=== Newspaper articles ===
- Melillo, Wendy (October 29, 1990). "Satisfying A Sweet Tooth with Angel-Food Cake". The Washington Post.
