= Vernon Miniard =

American politician

Judge of the 57th Kentucky Circuit Court
- In office November 2003 – January 2, 2023
- Preceded by: Donald Byrom
- Succeeded by: Sara Beth Gregory

County Attorney of Wayne County
- In office January 4, 1999 – November 2003

Member of the Kentucky House of Representatives from the 52nd district
- In office January 1, 1997 – January 1, 1999
- Preceded by: Jeffrey Buis (redistricting)
- Succeeded by: Ken Upchurch

Personal details
- Born: January 20, 1956 (age 70)
- Party: Republican

Vernon G. Miniard Jr. (born January 20, 1956) is an American politician and jurist from Kentucky who was a member of the Kentucky House of Representatives from 1997 to 1999, county attorney of Wayne County from 1999 to 2003, and a judge of the 57th Kentucky Circuit Court from 2003 to 2023.

Miniard was elected to the house in 1996 after incumbent representative Jeffrey Buis was redistricted to the 24th district. In 1998 Miniard was elected Wayne County Attorney. In November 2003 he won a special election to the 57th Kentucky Circuit Court, defeating incumbent judge Donald Byrom who was appointed by governor Paul E. Patton. Miniard won reelection to the court in 2006 and 2014, then retired in 2022.
