= Borderlines (1992 film) =

- Directed by: Ron Schildknecht
- Written by: Rebecca Reynolds
- Produced by: Ron Schildknecht
- Starring: Kathryn Ballard; Jim Petersmith; Sara Morsey
- Cinematography: Peter Pearce
- Edited by: Ron Schildknecht
- Music by: Howard Perdew
- Production company: Germantown Films
- Release date: November 28, 1992
- Running time: 48 minutes
- Country: United States
- Language: English

Borderlines is a 1992 American independent period drama short film directed by Ron Schildknecht and written by Rebecca Reynolds.

The film focuses on a schoolteacher in the Southern Appalachian countryside along the Tennessee and Kentucky border who attempts to combat the community's violent lifestyle during the Great Depression.

It was filmed on location in Wayne County, Kentucky, in May 1990.

== Synopsis ==
Schoolteacher Larlee Sanders is forced to attempt to change a deeply embedded social behavior, when flares erupt in her rural community.

== Cast ==
- Larlee Sanders - Kathryn Ballard
- Jim Petersmith - Calvin Jones
- Cilla Hatcher - Sara Mosey
- Doc Noll - Jeff Lomax
