= Wayne County School District (Kentucky) =

School district in Kentucky, United States

Address
- 1025 South Main Street Monticello, Kentucky, 42633; United States

District information
- Type: Public
- Grades: PreK–12
- NCES District ID: 2105790

Students and staff
- Students: 3,133
- Teachers: 187.19
- Staff: 297.0
- Student–teacher ratio: 16.74

Other information
- Website: www3.wayne.kyschools.us

Wayne County School District (WCSD) is a school district headquartered in Monticello, Kentucky. It serves Wayne County.

On June 30, 2013 Monticello Independent Schools closed and was merged into Wayne County Schools.

== Schools ==
Secondary

- Wayne County High School
- Wayne County Middle School

Primary

- Bell Elementary School
- Monticello Elementary School

Preschool

- Walker Early Learning Center

Other

- Wayne County Area Technology Center (ATC)

Vocational education in the county has been provided by Wayne County Vocational School from 1971 to the present. Its name has changed several times during that period; it is presently knows as Wayne County Area Technology Center (ATC). It is managed by The Office Of Career And Technical Education. The school serves secondary students enrolled in Wayne County High School. Programs include Health Science, Welding, Carpentry, Machine Tool, Automotive, Industrial Maintenance, and Business.
