= John S. Van Winkle =

American attorney and politician

41st Secretary of State of Kentucky
- In office May 24, 1866 – September 2, 1867
- Governor: Thomas E. Bramlette
- Preceded by: Ephraim L. Van Winkle
- Succeeded by: Samuel B. Churchill

Member of the Kentucky House of Representatives from Wayne County
- In office August 5, 1861 – August 3, 1863
- Preceded by: Shelby Coffey Jr.
- Succeeded by: H. W. Tuttle

Personal details
- Born: March 8, 1829 Wayne County, Kentucky, U.S.
- Died: October 28, 1888 (aged 59) Boyle County, Kentucky, U.S.
- Resting place: Bellevue Cemetery
- Party: Unknown
- Spouse(s): Mary Buster (m. 1858); Louise Dillon (m. 1867)
- Parent(s): Micajah Van Winkle; Mary Phillips
- Education: University of Louisville

John S. Van Winkle (March 8, 1829 – October 28, 1888) was an American attorney and politician who served as Secretary of State of Kentucky from 1866 to 1867. He served as a member of the Kentucky House of Representatives from 1861 to 1863.

== Early life and education ==
John S. Van Winkle was born on March 8, 1829, in Wayne County, Kentucky, to Micajah Van Winkle and Mary Phillips. He received his early education in Monticello, Kentucky. At age eighteen, he found work as a salesman in a store. He attended law school at the University of Louisville. Van Winkle married Mary Buster on January 21, 1858, the couple had no children. After Mary's death, he married Louise Dillon, they had 7 children.

== Career ==
In 1854, Van Winkle was admitted to the Kentucky bar, and began practice as a lawyer in Wayne County. In 1861, he was elected a member of the Kentucky House of Representatives. In 1863, he moved to Danville, Kentucky.

On May 24, 1866, Van Winkle was appointed Secretary of State of Kentucky by Governor Thomas E. Bramlette, to fill the unexpired term of his brother Ephraim L. Van Winkle. After he left office, he resumed his work as a lawyer in Danville.

== Death ==
Van Winkle died on October 28, 1888, at the age of 59, in Boyle County, Kentucky. He was interred at Bellevue Cemetery in Danville, Kentucky.
