= Parmleysville, Kentucky =

Unincorporated community in Kentucky, United States

Parmleysville
- Unincorporated community
- Location within the state of Kentucky Parmleysville (the United States)
- Coordinates: 36°41′3″N 84°45′14″W
- Country: United States
- State: Kentucky
- County: Wayne
- Elevation: 902 ft (275 m)
- Time zone: UTC-5 (Eastern (EST))
  - Summer (DST): UTC-4 (EST)
- GNIS feature ID: 514443

Parmleysville is an unincorporated community in Wayne County, Kentucky, United States. Also known as Horse Hollow, it lies approximately 14 miles southeast of the county seat of Monticello along the banks of the Little South Fork of the Cumberland River.
