= Kentucky's 52nd House of Representatives district =

American legislative district

Kentucky's 52nd State House of Representatives district
Representative
Ken Upchurch; R–Monticello
since February 19, 2013
- Registration: 72.3% Republican; 19.6% Democratic; 7.7% No party preference
- Demographics: 90.9% White; 2.7% Black; 3.3% Hispanic; 0.3% Asian; 0.2% Native American; 0.2% Other; 2.4% Multiracial
- Population (2024): 48,292
- Registered voters (2026): 33,634

Kentucky's 52nd House of Representatives district is one of 100 districts in the Kentucky House of Representatives. Located in the eastern part of the state, it comprises McCreary, Wayne, and part of Pulaski Counties. It has been represented by Ken Upchurch (R–Monticello) since 2013. He previously represented the district from 1999 to 2011. As of 2024, the district had a population of 48,292.

== Voter registration ==
On January 1, 2026, the district had 33,634 registered voters, who were registered with the following parties.

Party	Registration	
Party	Voters	%
Republican	24,332	72.34
Democratic	6,581	19.57
Independent	1,471	4.37
Libertarian	94	0.28
Green	15	0.04
Constitution	14	0.04
Socialist Workers	9	0.03
Reform	2	0.01
"Other"	1,116	3.32
Total	33,634	100.00

== List of members representing the district ==
Member	Party	Years	Electoral history	District location
Raymond Overstreet (Liberty)	Republican	January 1, 1972 – January 1, 1993	Elected in 1971. Reelected in 1973. Reelected in 1975. Reelected in 1977. Reelected in 1979. Reelected in 1981. Reelected in 1984. Reelected in 1986. Reelected in 1988. Reelected in 1990. Retired.	1972–1974; Adair, Casey, and Cumberland Counties.
Raymond Overstreet (Liberty)	Republican	January 1, 1972 – January 1, 1993	Elected in 1971. Reelected in 1973. Reelected in 1975. Reelected in 1977. Reelected in 1979. Reelected in 1981. Reelected in 1984. Reelected in 1986. Reelected in 1988. Reelected in 1990. Retired.	1974–1985; Adair, Casey, and Russell (part) Counties.
Raymond Overstreet (Liberty)	Republican	January 1, 1972 – January 1, 1993	Elected in 1971. Reelected in 1973. Reelected in 1975. Reelected in 1977. Reelected in 1979. Reelected in 1981. Reelected in 1984. Reelected in 1986. Reelected in 1988. Reelected in 1990. Retired.	1985–1993; Adair, Casey, and Russell (part) Counties.
Jeffrey Buis (Liberty)	Republican	January 1, 1993 – January 1, 1997	Elected in 1992. Reelected in 1994. Redistricted to the 24th district and lost reelection.	1993–1997; Casey, Russell, and Wayne (part) Counties.
Vernon Miniard (Monticello)	Republican	January 1, 1997 – January 1, 1999	Elected in 1996. Retired to run for Wayne County Attorney.	1997–2003
Ken Upchurch (Monticello)	Republican	January 1, 1999 – January 1, 2011	Elected in 1998. Reelected in 2000. Reelected in 2002. Reelected in 2004. Reelected in 2006. Reelected in 2008. Retired to run for Judge/Executive of Wayne County.	1997–2003
Ken Upchurch (Monticello)	Republican	January 1, 1999 – January 1, 2011	Elected in 1998. Reelected in 2000. Reelected in 2002. Reelected in 2004. Reelected in 2006. Reelected in 2008. Retired to run for Judge/Executive of Wayne County.	2003–2015
Sara Beth Gregory (Monticello)	Republican	January 1, 2011 – December 2012	Elected in 2010. Reelected in 2012 but declined to serve after being elected to the Kentucky Senate.	2003–2015
Vacant		December 2012 – February 19, 2013		2003–2015
Ken Upchurch (Monticello)	Republican	February 19, 2013 – present	Elected to the vacant term. Reelected in 2014. Reelected in 2016. Reelected in 2018. Reelected in 2020. Reelected in 2022. Reelected in 2024. Retired.	2003–2015
Ken Upchurch (Monticello)	Republican	February 19, 2013 – present	Elected to the vacant term. Reelected in 2014. Reelected in 2016. Reelected in 2018. Reelected in 2020. Reelected in 2022. Reelected in 2024. Retired.	2015–2023
Ken Upchurch (Monticello)	Republican	February 19, 2013 – present	Elected to the vacant term. Reelected in 2014. Reelected in 2016. Reelected in 2018. Reelected in 2020. Reelected in 2022. Reelected in 2024. Retired.	2023–present
Kevin Jones (Monticello)	Republican	Assuming office January 1, 2027	Elected in 2026.	2023–present
