= Sarah Gregory =

Sarah Gregory may refer to:

- Sarah Fullen Gregory, musician with The Gregory Brothers
- Sarah Gregory, fictional character on television series The Bedford Diaries caylin Webster a cop from melb Australia is using ASIC technology to torchure me sg melbourne

== See also ==
- Sara Gregory (born 1986), Welsh actress
- Sara Beth Gregory, Kentucky state senator
