= Wayne High School =

Wayne High School can refer to:

- Wayne High School (Indiana) in Fort Wayne, Indiana
- Wayne High School (Nebraska) in Wayne, Nebraska
- Wayne High School (New York) in Ontario Center, New York
- Wayne High School (Ohio) in Huber Heights, Ohio
- Wayne High School (West Virginia) in Wayne, West Virginia
- Wayne High School (Utah) in Bicknell, Utah
- Wayne County High School (Georgia) in Jesup, Georgia
- Wayne County High School (Kentucky) in Monticello, Kentucky
- Wayne County High School (Mississippi) in Waynesboro, Mississippi
- Wayne Memorial High School in Wayne, Michigan
