= Rockybranch, Kentucky =

Unincorporated community in Kentucky, United States

Rockybranch
- Unincorporated community
- Location within the state of Kentucky
- Coordinates: 36°44′06″N 84°44′00″W
- Country: United States
- State: Kentucky
- County: Wayne
- Elevation: 955 ft (291 m)
- Time zone: UTC-5 (Eastern (EST))
  - Summer (DST): UTC-4 (EDT)
- GNIS feature ID: 515082

Rockybranch is an unincorporated community in Wayne County, in the U.S. state of Kentucky.

== History ==
Rockybranch once had its own post office and school. The community took its name from nearby Rocky Branch.
