= Dorothy Hinshaw Patent =

American writer

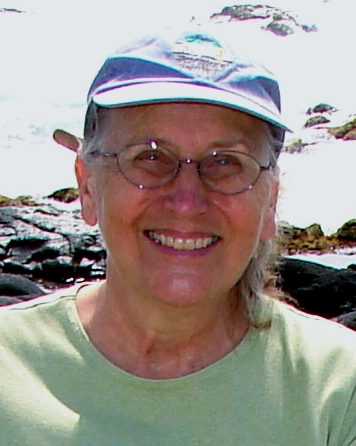
- Patent in Hawaii, 2007
- Born: Dorothy Hinshaw; April 30, 1940 (age 86) Rochester, Minnesota, US
- Occupation: Writer and educator
- Education: BA in biological sciences, Ph.D. in zoology
- Alma mater: Stanford University, University of California at Berkeley
- Genre: Children's nonfiction
- Subject: Nature
- Notable awards: Washington Post/Children's Book Guild 2004 Nonfiction Award
- Spouse: Greg Patent

Website
- dorothyhinshawpatent.com

Dorothy Hinshaw Patent (born April 30, 1940) is a teacher and author of over 100 children's nonfiction books such as: How Smart are Animals?, At Home with the Beaver, and Saving the Tasmanian Devil. She lives in Lihui, Hawaii.

In 1964 she married Greg Patent.

== Awards ==
She has received numerous awards for her writing. "In 1987, she received the Eva L. Gordon Award from the American Nature Study Society in recognition of her outstanding contribution to science literature for young readers." She received the Washington Post/Children's Book Guild 2004 Nonfiction Award.
