= Monticello Historic Commercial District =

- U.S. National Register of Historic Places
- Location within Kentucky Location within the United States
- Location: Main and Columbus Sts., Monticello, Kentucky
- Coordinates: 36°49′46″N 84°50′57″W
- Area: 2.4 acres (0.97 ha)
- Architectural style: Mixed (more Than 2 Styles From Different Periods)
- NRHP reference No.: 82001577
- Added to NRHP: October 29, 1982

The Monticello Historic Commercial District, around Main and Columbus Streets in Monticello, Kentucky, is a 2.4 acres (0.97 ha) historic district which was listed on the National Register of Historic Places in 1982.

It includes a United States Post Office among its 11 contributing buildings.

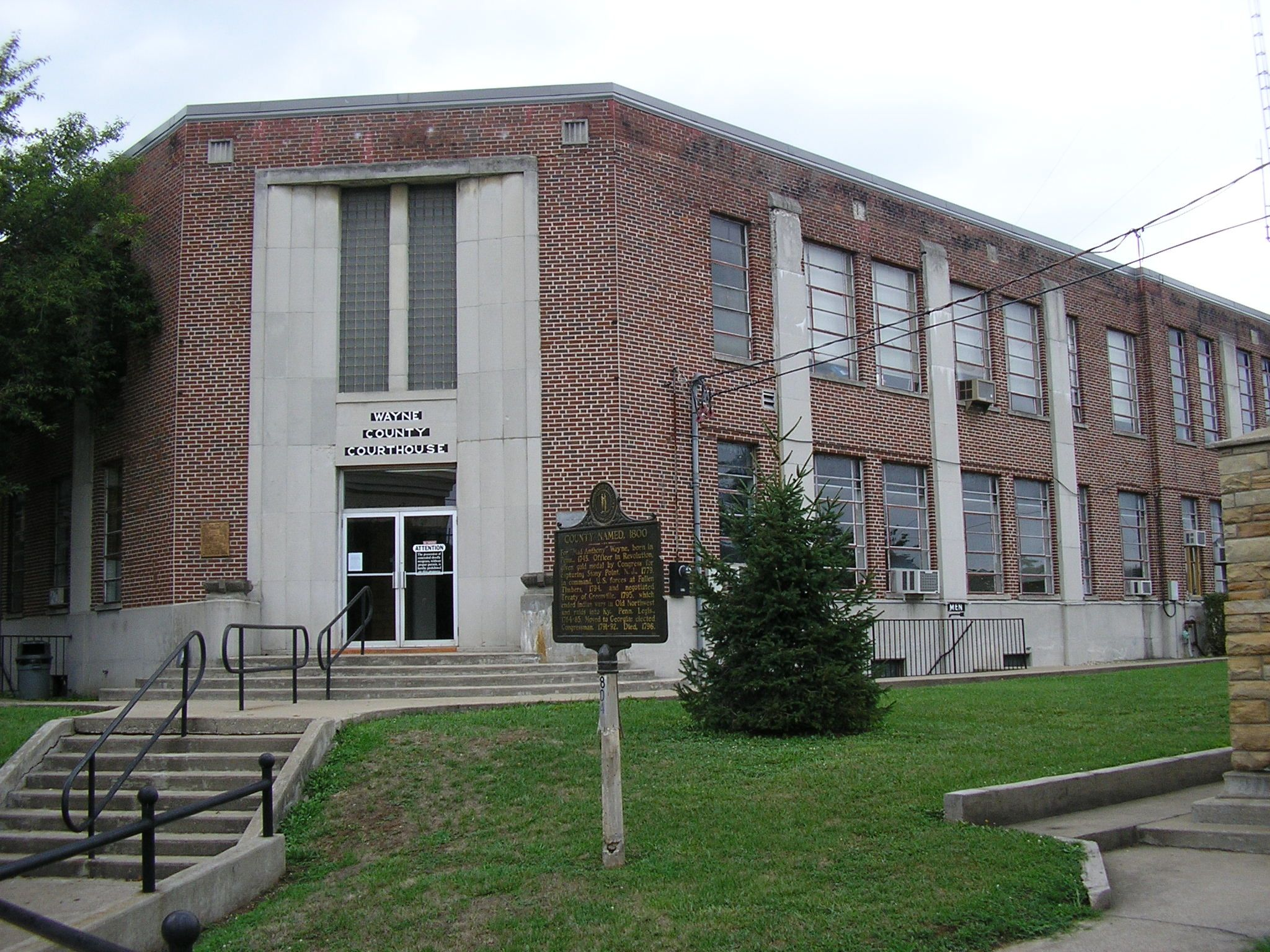
Wayne County Courthouse, not part of the district

The modern Wayne County Courthouse is excluded from the district.
