= Ephraim L. Van Winkle =

American politician

40th Secretary of State of Kentucky
- In office September 1, 1863 – May 23, 1866
- Governor: Thomas E. Bramlette
- Preceded by: Daniel C. Wickliffe
- Succeeded by: John S. Van Winkle

Member of the Kentucky House of Representatives from Wayne County
- In office August 6, 1855 – August 4, 1856
- Preceded by: Walter E. Hall
- Succeeded by: James C. Belshe

Personal details
- Born: July 20, 1827 Wayne County, Kentucky, U.S.
- Died: May 23, 1866 (aged 38)
- Party: Unknown (most likely Whig)
- Parent(s): Micajah Van Winkle; Mary Phillips
- Education: Monticello Academy; University of Louisville

Ephraim L. Van Winkle (July 20, 1827 – May 23, 1866) was an American politician who served as Secretary of State of Kentucky from 1863 until his death in 1866. He was most likely a member of the Whig Party.

== Early life and education ==
Ephraim L. Van Winkle was born on July 20, 1827, in Wayne County, Kentucky, to Micajah Van Winkle and Mary Phillips. He attended Monticello University and graduated from the University of Louisville's law department in 1850.

== Career ==
After graduating, Van Winkle began practicing law in Wayne County. In 1855, he was elected as a member of the American Party to represent Wayne County in the Kentucky House of Representatives. He was elected Commonwealth attorney for the 6th district in 1856. In 1860, Van Winkle was a Presidential elector for the John Bell and Edward Everett slate.

In 1863, Van Winkle was appointed Secretary of State of Kentucky by governor Thomas E. Bramlette. He had emancipationist beliefs.

== Death ==
Van Winkle died on May 23, 1866, at the age of 38. He was interred in Frankfort, Kentucky. His position as Secretary of State of Kentucky was filled by his brother John S. Van Winkle.
