= Mill Springs, Kentucky =

Unincorporated community in Kentucky, United States

Mill Springs
- Unincorporated community
- Location within the state of Kentucky
- Coordinates: 36°55′55″N 84°46′45″W
- Country: United States
- State: Kentucky
- County: Wayne
- Elevation: 853 ft (260 m)
- Time zone: UTC-5 (Eastern (EST))
  - Summer (DST): UTC-4 (EDT)
- GNIS feature ID: 498295

Mill Springs, Kentucky is an unincorporated community in Wayne County, Kentucky.

== Geography ==
The community is located in northern Wayne County on the shores of Lake Cumberland (Cumberland River). It is located along Kentucky Route 1275 about 7 miles (11 km) northeast of Monticello.

== Points of interest ==
The area includes multiple springs and the Mill Springs Mill, a watermill built in 1877 which is listed on the National Register of Historic Places.

There are said to be 13 springs, discovered by Daniel Boone, who suggested that it was a good site for a mill.
