= Sara Beth Gregory =

American politician

Judge of the 57th Kentucky Circuit Court
- Incumbent
- Assumed office January 2, 2023
- Preceded by: Vernon Miniard

Member of the Kentucky Senate from the 16th district
- In office December 2012 – January 1, 2015
- Preceded by: David Williams
- Succeeded by: Max Wise

Member of the Kentucky House of Representatives from the 52nd district
- In office January 1, 2011 – December 2012
- Preceded by: Ken Upchurch
- Succeeded by: Ken Upchurch

Personal details
- Born: November 5, 1982 (age 43)
- Party: Republican

Sara Beth Gregory (born November 5, 1982) is an American politician and jurist from Kentucky who is a judge of the 57th Kentucky Circuit Court. She was previously a member of the Kentucky House of Representatives and Kentucky Senate.

Gregory was first elected to the house in 2010 after incumbent representative Ken Upchurch retired to run for Judge/Executive of Wayne County. She won a special election for the 16th senate district in December 2012 following the resignation of incumbent senator David Williams. She was defeated for the Republican nomination for a full term in 2014 by Max Wise.

In 2022 she was elected to the 57th Kentucky Circuit Court following the retirement of judge Vernon Miniard.
