= Jeffrey Buis (politician) =

American politician

Member of the Kentucky House of Representatives from the 52nd district
- In office January 1, 1993 – January 1, 1997
- Preceded by: Raymond Overstreet
- Succeeded by: Vernon Miniard (redistricting)

Personal details
- Born: January 29, 1968 (age 58)
- Party: Republican

Vernon Jeffrey Buis (born January 29, 1968) is an American politician from Kentucky who was a member of the Kentucky House of Representatives from 1993 to 1997. Buis was first elected in 1992 after incumbent representative Raymond Overstreet retired. In 1996 Buis was redistricted to the 24th district and lost to Democratic incumbent William Scott.
