= Ken Upchurch =

American politician (born 1969)

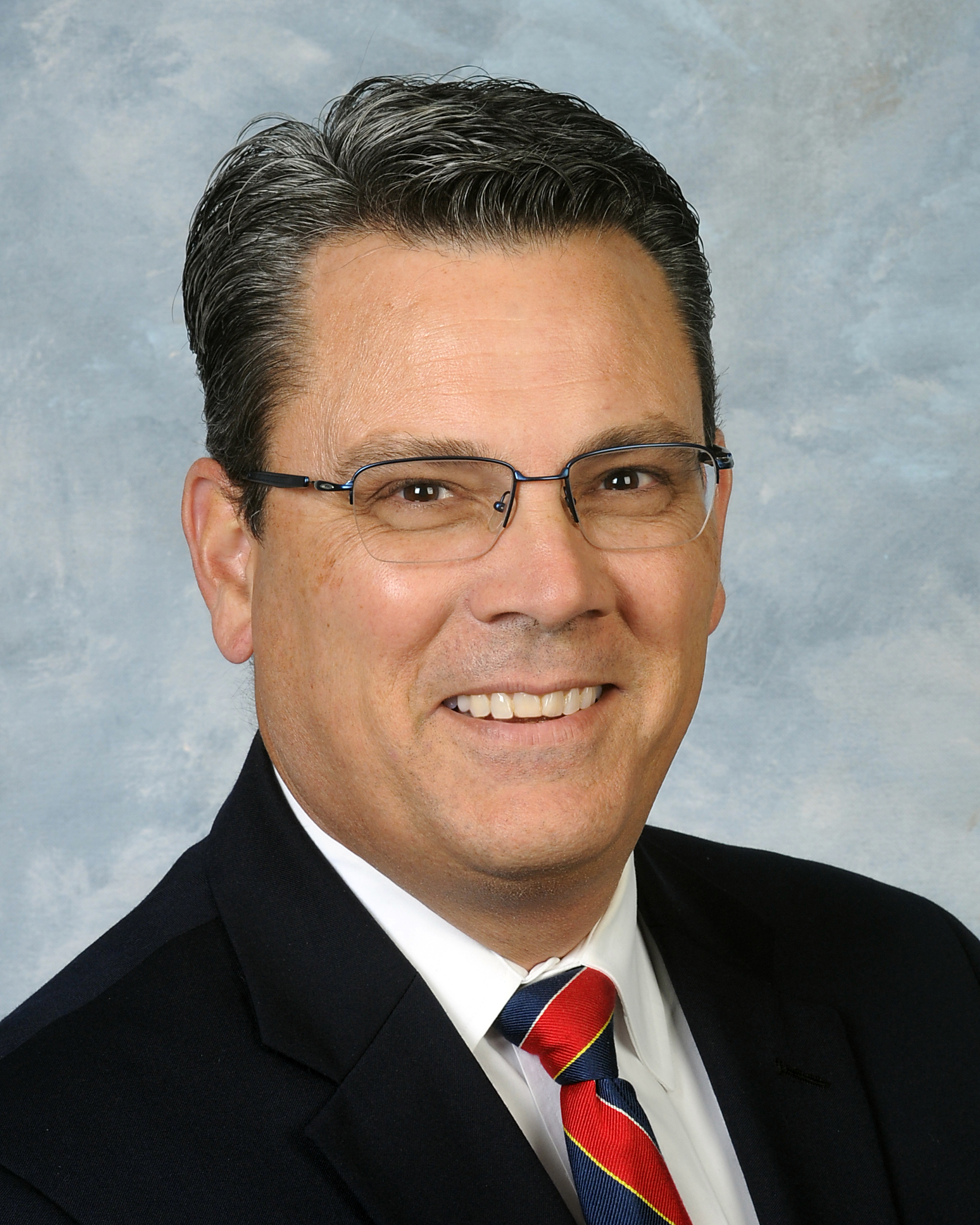

Member of the Kentucky House of Representatives from the 52nd district
- Incumbent
- Assumed office February 19, 2013
- Preceded by: Sara Beth Gregory
- In office January 1, 1999 – January 1, 2011
- Preceded by: Vernon Miniard
- Succeeded by: Sara Beth Gregory

Personal details
- Born: June 4, 1969 (age 57) Richmond, Kentucky, U.S.
- Party: Republican
- Spouse: Melissa Upchurch
- Children: 2
- Education: Eastern Kentucky University
- Profession: Insurance agent
- Committees: Budget Review Subcommittee on Transportation (Chair); Appropriations & Revenue; Transportation

Kenneth Howard Upchurch (born June 4, 1969) is an American politician and Republican member of the Kentucky House of Representatives from Kentucky's 52nd House district since February 2013. He had previously held the seat from 1999 to 2010. His district includes McCreary and Wayne counties as well as part of Pulaski County. Upchurch did not seek reelection in 2026.

== Background ==
Upchurch was born on June 4, 1969, and was raised in Monticello, Kentucky. He graduated from Wayne County High School before earning a Bachelor of Arts in political science from Eastern Kentucky University in 1992. While at EKU, Upchurch was involved in the student government and was elected student body president for the 1991–1992 academic year. During this time, he served as a voting member of the university's board of regents.

Upchurch is employed as an insurance agent with Upchurch Insurance and Financial services. Prior to this, he was the owner publisher of the Monticello Stage, a community newspaper.

He is a member of the Elk Spring Valley Baptist Church in Monticello, and sits on the board of Immanuel Christian Academy.

== Political career ==
=== Leadership ===
Upchurch was selected by the Kentucky House Republican Caucus to serve as minority whip. He held this position from 2002 to 2007.

Since returning to the House in 2013, Upchurch has served in various chair positions including chair of the transportation committee. Currently, he serves as chair of the budget review subcommittee on transportation which is tasked to oversee financial matters relating to aviation, roads, infrastructure, commercial water travel, highway safety, the Kentucky State Police, automobiles, traffic regulations, tunnels, and driver's testing.

=== Elections ===
- 1998 Incumbent representative Vernon Miniard chose to run for Wayne County Attorney instead of reelection to Kentucky's 52nd House district. Upchurch won the crowded 1998 Republican primary with 2,944 votes (40.6%), and won the 1998 Kentucky House of Representatives election with 8,505 (75.5%) against Democratic candidate Arthur J. Bolze.
- 2000 Upchurch was unopposed in both the 2000 Republican primary and 2000 Kentucky House of Representatives election, winning with 9,074 votes.
- 2002 Upchurch was unopposed in both the 2002 Republican primary and 2002 Kentucky House of Representatives election, winning with 6,747 votes.
- 2004 Upchurch won the 2004 Republican primary with 1,902 votes (71.2%) and won the 2004 Kentucky House of Representatives election with 9,627 votes (72.1%) against Democratic candidate Sammy Whittenburg.
- 2006 Upchurch was unopposed in both the 2006 Republican primary and 2006 Kentucky House of Representatives election, winning with 8,957 votes.
- 2007 Upchurch was defeated in the crowded 2007 Republican primary for Kentucky State Treasurer, garnering 36,394 votes (21.4%).
- 2008 Upchurch was unopposed in both the 2008 Republican primary and 2008 Kentucky House of Representatives election, winning with 10,852 votes.
- 2010 Upchurch chose not seek reelection to Kentucky's 52nd House district, instead choosing to run for Judge Executive of Wayne County, Kentucky. Upchurch won the 2010 Republican primary with 2,102 votes (61.2%) but was defeated in the 2010 Wayne County Judge Executive election against Democratic incumbent Greg Rankin.
- 2013 Governor Steve Beshear called for a special election following the resignation of incumbent representative Sarah Beth Gregory to take the vacant seat for Kentucky's 16th Senate district. Upchurch won the 2013 Kentucky House of Representatives special election with 1,666 votes (59.1%) against Democratic candidate Harvey Shearer.
- 2014 Upchurch won the 2014 Republican primary with 4,959 votes (64%) and was unopposed in the 2014 Kentucky House of Representatives election, winning with 11,023 votes.
- 2016 Upchurch was unopposed in both the 2016 Republican primary and 2016 Kentucky House of Representatives election, winning with 13,376 votes.
- 2018 Upchurch was unopposed in the 2018 Republican primary and won the 2018 Kentucky House of Representatives election with 10,188 votes (73%) against Democratic candidate Dean Sumpter.
- 2020 Upchurch won the 2020 Republican primary with 4,357 votes (57.1%) and was unopposed in the 2020 Kentucky House of Representatives election, winning with 16,375 votes.
- 2022 Upchurch won the 2022 Republican primary with 5,438 votes (62.6%) and was unopposed in the 2022 Kentucky House of Representatives election, winning with 11,931 votes.
- 2024 Upchurch was unopposed in both the 2024 Republican primary and the 2024 Kentucky House of Representatives election, winning the latter with 16,723 votes.

Political offices
| Preceded by Vernon Miniard Jr. | Kentucky State Representative from District 52; 1999–2010 | Succeeded by Sara Beth Gregory |
| Preceded by Sara Beth Gregory | Kentucky State Representative from District 52; 2013– | Succeeded by Incumbent |
