= Hotel Breeding =

- U.S. National Register of Historic Places
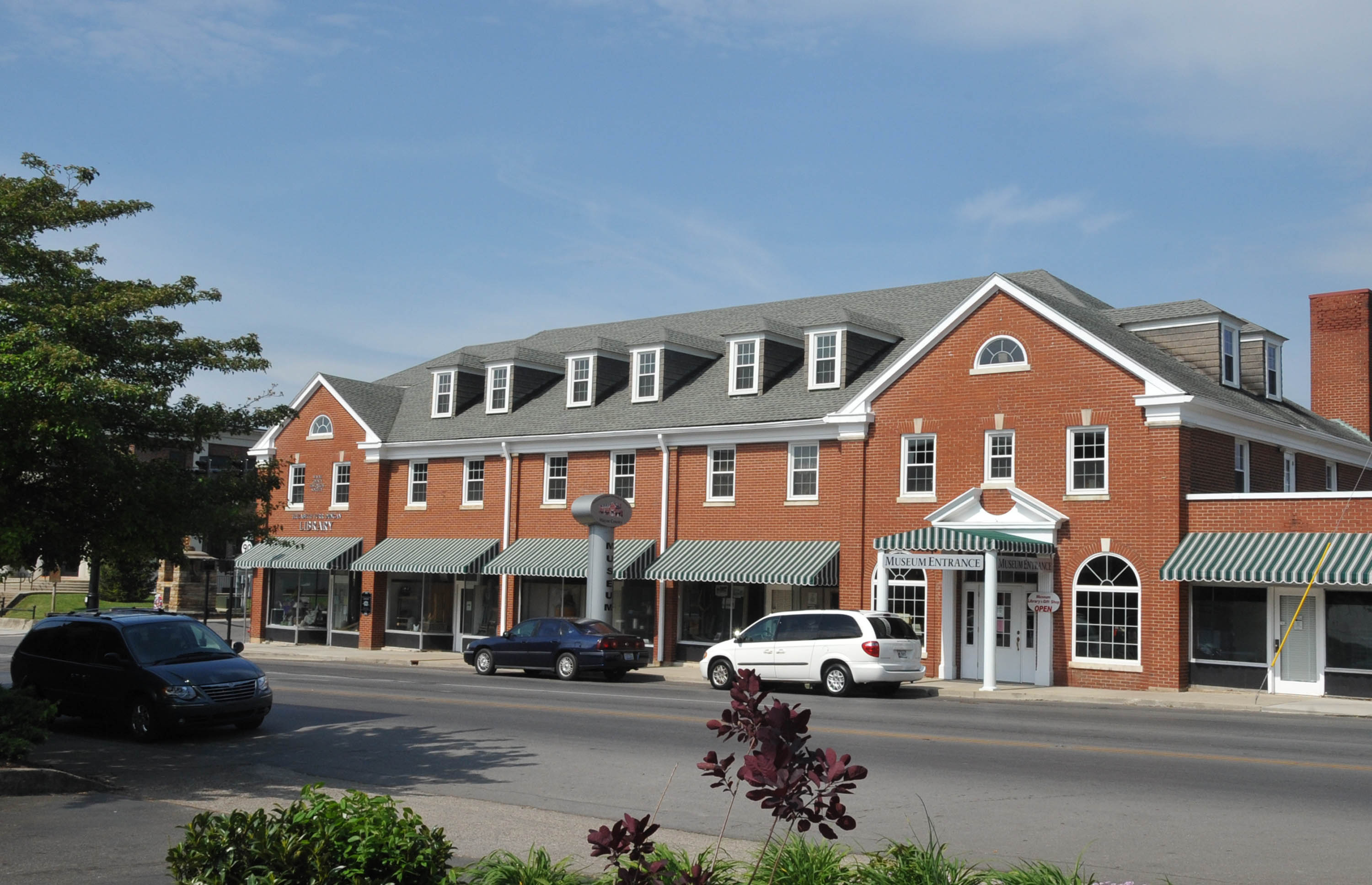
- Location: 201--211 N. Main St., Monticello, Kentucky
- Coordinates: 36°49′50″N 84°50′55″W
- Area: less than one acre
- Built: 1935-36
- Architect: Herbert E. Redman
- Architectural style: Colonial Revival
- NRHP reference No.: 88001315
- Added to NRHP: August 25, 1988

Hotel Breeding, at 201-211 N. Main St. in Monticello, Kentucky, was listed on the National Register of Historic Places in 1988.

It is a two-and-a-half-story Colonial Revival-style hotel built in 1935–36. It is built of structural clay tile veneered in brick, on a concrete basement.
