= Raymond Overstreet =

American politician (1942–2011)

Member of the Kentucky House of Representatives from the 52nd district
- In office January 1, 1972 – January 1, 1993
- Preceded by: James T. Alexander (redistricting)
- Succeeded by: Jeffrey Buis

Personal details
- Born: December 3, 1942
- Died: January 9, 2011 (aged 68)
- Party: Republican

Raymond D. Overstreet (December 3, 1942 – January 9, 2011) was an American politician from Kentucky who was a member of the Kentucky House of Representatives from 1972 to 1993. Overstreet was first elected to the house in 1971. Due to redistricting, he defeated incumbent representative Hershel Brown of the 81st district for the Republican nomination for the 52nd district, comprising Adair, Casey, and Cumberland Counties. He did not seek reelection in 1992.

He died in January 2011 at age 68.
