= Rock Branch (Camp Creek tributary) =

River in Missouri, United States of America

Coordinates: 38.976154°N 91.217651°W

Rock Branch is a stream in Warren County in the U.S. state of Missouri. It is a tributary of Camp Creek.

The name "Rock Branch" is illustrative of its rocky character.

== See also ==
- List of rivers of Missouri
