= Rocky Branch (Panther Creek tributary) =

Stream in the American state of Missouri

Coordinates: 38.601957°N 94.144666°W

Rocky Branch is a stream in Cass County in the U.S. state of Missouri. It is a tributary of Panther Creek.

Rocky Branch was named for the rocky character of its creek bed.

== See also ==
- List of rivers of Missouri
