= Rocky Branch (Burris Fork tributary) =

Stream in the American state of Missouri

Coordinates: 38.495304°N 92.674913°W

Rocky Branch is a stream in Moniteau and Morgan Counties in the U.S. state of Missouri. It is a tributary of Burris Fork.

Rocky Branch (historically called "Rocky Creek") was so named on account of the rocky character of the creek bed.

== See also ==
- List of rivers of Missouri
