= Rocky Branch (Kennedy Creek tributary) =

Coordinates: 36.7453515°N 84.7132747°W

Rocky Branch is a stream entirely within Wayne County, Kentucky. It is a tributary of Kennedy Creek.

Rocky Branch was named for the rocks in and around its course.

== See also ==
- List of rivers of Kentucky
