= Greg Patent =

American cookbook author and baker

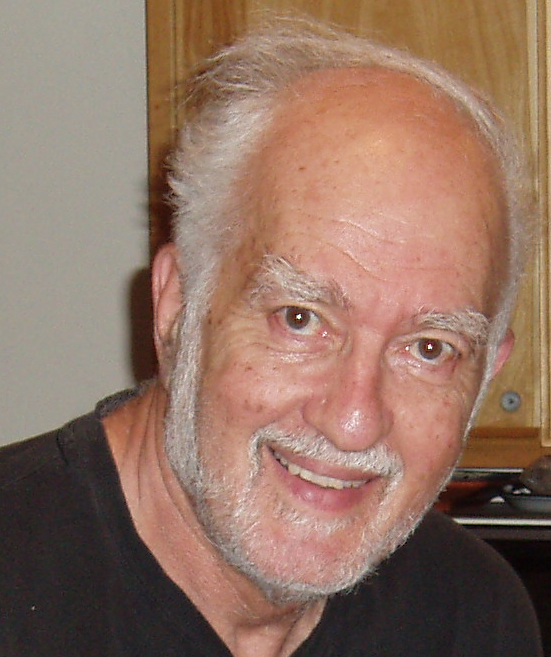
- Patent in 2010
- Born: Hong Kong, People's Republic of China
- Occupation: Chef
- Spouse: Dorothy Hinshaw Patent
- Writing career
- Notable awards: James Beard Award, Gourmand World Cookbook Award, Cordon D'Or
- Website: gregpatent.com

Greg Patent is an American cookbook author and baker. He also co-hosts a weekly radio show about food on Montana Public Radio, The Food Guys, with Jon Jackson, and has made guest appearances on television and radio programs throughout the United States.

== Early life ==
Born in the British Crown Colony of Hong Kong to a Russian father and Iraqi mother, who met and married in Shanghai. His mother and grandmother emigrated to Shanghai from Iraq in 1930, as did many Iraqi Jews. Patent lived in China until he was eleven years of age.

During World War II, he and his family lived with his grandmother in a one-room apartment. She was a baker who often prepared kosher Middle Eastern food. Soon after the war in 1950, he and his parents had immigrated to the United States, and traveled by ship to San Francisco.

At the age of eighteen, Patent had entered into the Pillsbury Bake-Off and won second prize in the junior division. However, with his parents' aspirations of him becoming an engineer or scientist, Patent studied and graduated from the University of California, Berkeley with a Ph.D. in Zoology and began a career in academia.

== Career ==
He worked as a teacher at the University of Montana in Missoula for ten years and later began writing a weekly food column for the local paper, the Missoulian, and also hosted a 30-minute cooking show that was taped in his home kitchen.

The owners of Cuisinarts, Inc., Carl Sontheimer, and his wife, Shirley, hired Patent as their national spokesperson. He featured on a 26-show series featuring the Cuisinarts food processor, which aired on The Learning Channel.

In the early 1990s, Patent began writing full-time about food. His cookbook, Baking in America, was an IACP cookbook award finalist and won the 2003 James Beard Award and the Gourmand World Cookbook Award for the Best Baking Book in the English Language. In November 2004, he was profiled as "The Cake Crusader", in Food & Wine by Matt and Ted Lee.

He currently lives in Missoula, Montana with his wife, another zoologist, Dorothy Hinshaw, whom he met at graduate school.

== Bibliography ==
- 2008 – Montana Cooking: A Big Taste of Big Sky Country
- 2007 – A Baker's Odyssey: Celebrating Time-Honored Recipes from America's Rich Immigrant Heritage
- 2002 – Baking in America: Traditional and Contemporary Favorites from the Past 200 Years
- 2001 – New Frontiers in Western Cooking
- 1999 – Food Processor Cooking: Quick and Easy
- 1999 – A Is for Apple: More Than 200 Recipes for Eating, Munching and Cooking with America's Favorite Fruit
- 1996 – New Cooking from the Old West
- 1990 – Shanghai Passage
- 1985 – Patently Easy Food Processor Cooking
