= Mill Springs Mill =

- U.S. National Register of Historic Places
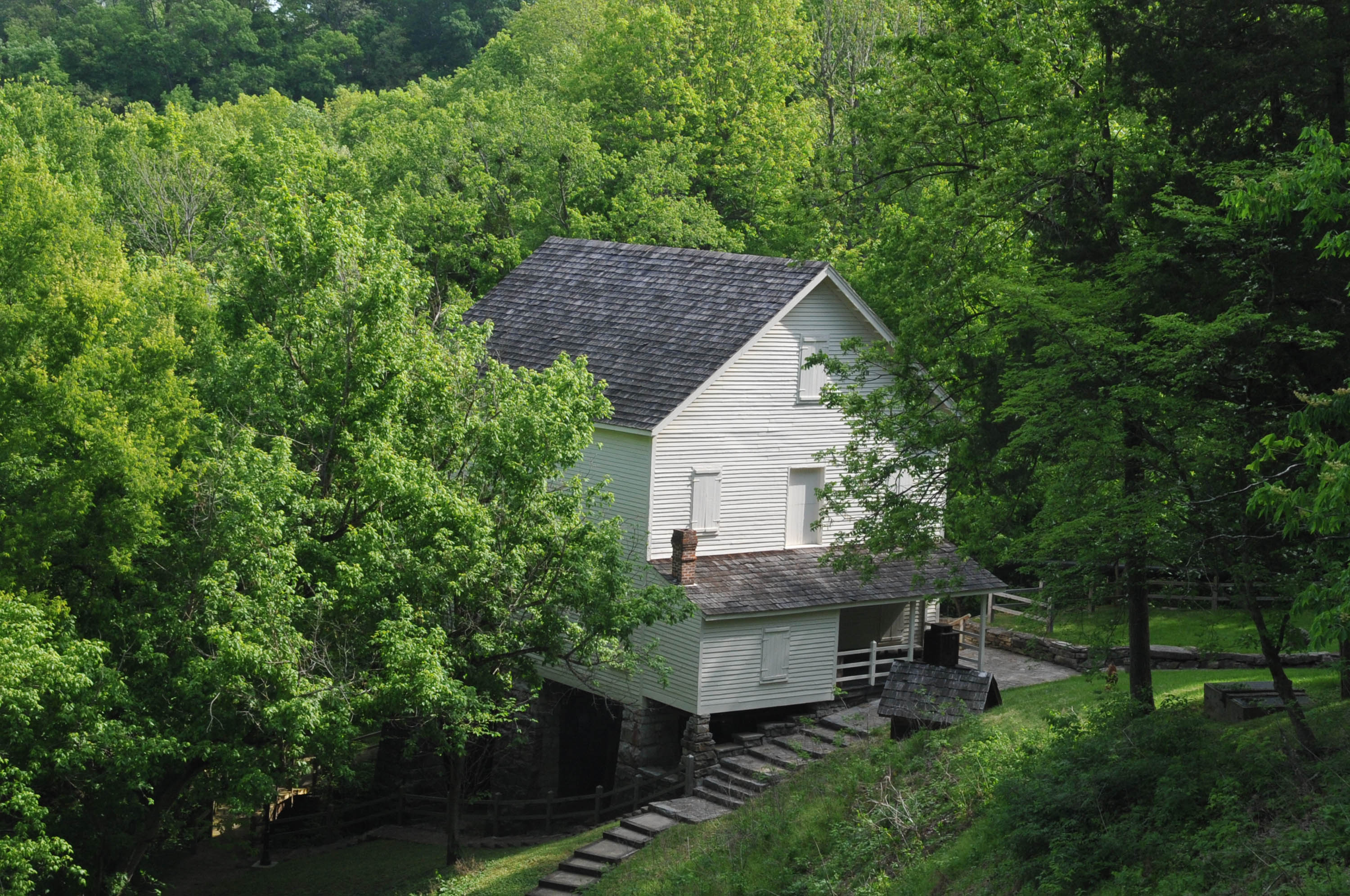

- Location within Kentucky Location within the United States
- Location: Off KY 90, Mill Springs, Kentucky
- Coordinates: 36°56′03″N 84°46′44″W
- Area: 5 acres (2.0 ha)
- Built: 1877
- NRHP reference No.: 73000858
- Added to NRHP: April 11, 1973

The Mill Springs Mill, located off Kentucky Route 90 at Mill Springs in Wayne County, Kentucky, is a historic watermill built in 1877. It was listed on the National Register of Historic Places in 1973. It is the centerpiece of Mill Springs Park.

It is located on a descent to the Cumberland River. The springs uphill from the site were reportedly discovered by pioneer Daniel Boone, who suggested the site would be a good location for a mill.

The mill is a three-story frame building upon a 20 feet (6.1 m) basement, 40 by 40 feet (12 m × 12 m) in plan, supported by large stone columns. Its 1972 NRHP documentation states: "When the present structure was erected in 1877, a wooden wheel of 28 feet height was installed. When it was sold in 1907, the 28 foot wheel was removed and the present 40 foot high, 3 feet in breadth, wheel was installed."

It goes on to state that "The site includes the actual mill, the numerous springs and a small area which has been converted into a small roadside park. There is also a small frame building, formerly used as a granary, which is presently used by the Monticello Woman's Club as a gift shop."

It was deemed "important because of its historical role in the local commercial trade; in the fields of industry and engineering because of the unusual 40 foot wheel."

The mill was restored by the U.S. Army Corps of Engineers in 1976.

The site is open on weekends, seasonally, for visitors to tour and see corn being ground.
