= Rocky Branch (Mineral Fork tributary) =

Stream in the American state of Missouri

Coordinates: 38.089773°N 90.778465°W

Rocky Branch is a stream in Washington County in the U.S. state of Missouri. It is a tributary of Mineral Fork.

Rocky Branch was so named on account of its rocky character.

== See also ==
- List of rivers of Missouri
