= Lettice Bryan =

American author (1805–1877)

Lettice Pierce Bryan
- Born: Lettice Pierce; 1805; Kentucky, U.S.
- Died: 1877 (aged 71–72); Macoupin County, Illinois, U.S.
- Resting place: Cave Hill Cemetery, Louisville, Kentucky, U.S.
- Spouse: Edmond Bryan (m. 1823; died 1863)
- Children: 14

Lettice Pierce Bryan (1805–1877) was an American writer, who wrote The Kentucky Housewife, a cookbook originally published in 1839.

== Life ==
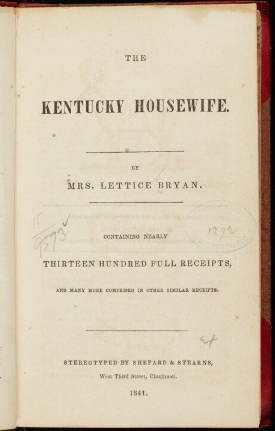
The Kentucky Housewife title page

Lettice Pierce was born in central Kentucky, probably near Danville, to James A. Pierce and Elizabeth Crow Pierce, one of three children. In 1823, she married Virginia-born Edmond Bryan. When Bryan was writing her cookbook, she lived in Monticello, Kentucky; her husband was studying at the Medical College of Ohio and the couple had nine young children. After the cookbook was published, the family moved twice - to Washington County and then to Grayson County, Kentucky. Bryan had 14 children.

Bryan died at age 72, in 1877, in Macoupin County, Illinois, at the home of her son-in-law C. F. Burnett. She is buried at Cave Hill Cemetery in Louisville, Kentucky. Her husband pre-deceased her, dying in 1863.

== The Kentucky Housewife ==
Bryan published The Kentucky Housewife, said to be Kentucky's first cookbook, in 1839. Anthropology professor John van Willigen described the recipes as being "about meat slaughtered at home and what was there on the farm". The book contains 1,300 recipes: Florence Fabricant of The New York Times described it as a "hefty tome. She compared it in style to Mary Randolph's 1824 The Virginia Housewife but noted differences in their versions of pumpkin pie. While both included brandy, Randolph used butter and a lattice top, with Bryan's pie having a dusting of grated sugar.

In a paper on plantation cookbooks, Kathryn Matheny wrote that Bryan did not give detailed procedures in her recipes, this being the prevailing style for cookbooks of the era. Food historian Stephen Schmidt described in a 2001 Yankee Magazine article a traditional election cake weighing as much as 90 pounds (41 kg), noting that Bryan and her contemporaries Lydia Maria Child and Eliza Leslie offered recipes for 5–7-pound (2.3–3.2 kg) versions. A recipe for mutton casserole was included, although casseroles were not well known in southern cooking at the time.
