= Monticello Independent Schools =

School district in Kentucky, USA

Monticello Independent Schools was a school district headquartered in Monticello, Kentucky. It operated Monticello Elementary School and Monticello Middle / High School.

The district was established in 1905. After a wave of school consolidations swept the state in 1960's and 1970's, it was one of the smallest public school districts in Kentucky. In 2013 the district had 850 students. The school district became insolvent in 2012 and Bill Estep of the Lexington Herald-Leader described the district as "troubled".

On December 17, 2012, the Monticello schools board voted for the Kentucky Department of Education management of their schools which was expected to result in a merger with Wayne County Schools.

On June 30, 2013, it closed and was merged into Wayne County Schools.

== Athletics ==
Monticello High School boys and girls basketball teams, nicknamed the Trojans and Lady Trojans, were notable, having participated in several Kentucky High School Athletic Association state tournaments, and produced numerous All-State players. The 1915 boys team was undefeated and claimed the state championship. The 1921 team was coached by Hall of Fame Coach Edgar Diddle, who led them to the state tournament semi-finals. From 1957 until 1980, the Trojans were coached by KHSAA Hall of Fame coach Joe Harper who led them to seven district championships, six regional titles, and to the state championship game in 1960. The Trojans made their final appearance in the KHSAA State Tournament in 1987 and the Kentucky Class A State Tournament in 1992; the Lady Trojans also made their last appearance in the KHSAA State Tournament in 1992 and the Kentucky Class A State Tournament in 2009.
