= Wayne County, Kentucky =

County in Kentucky, United States

- County
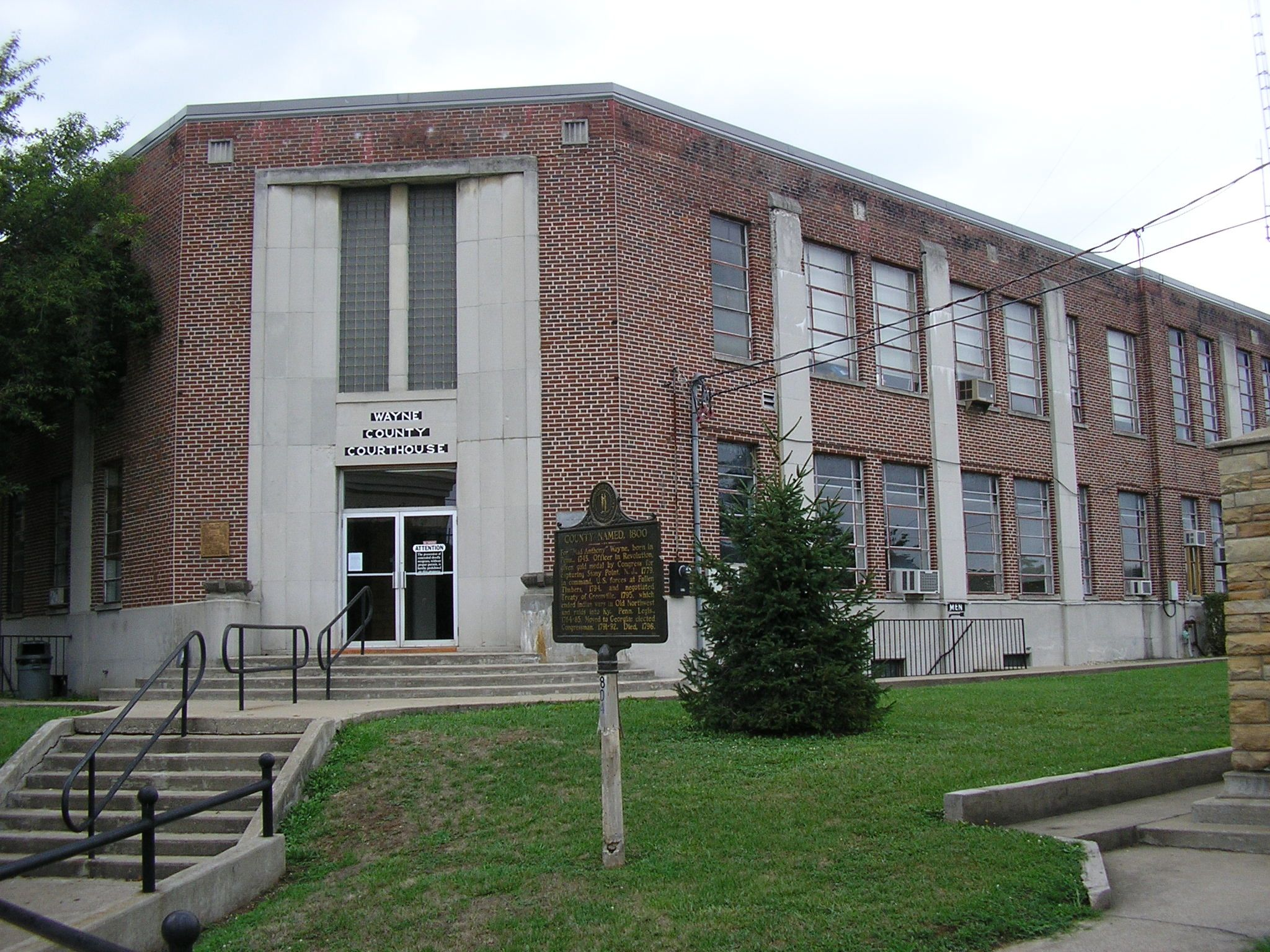
- Wayne County courthouse in Monticello

- Location within the U.S. state of Kentucky
- Coordinates: 36°49′N 84°50′W
- Country: United States
- State: Kentucky
- Founded: December 13, 1800
- Named for: Anthony Wayne
- Seat: Monticello
- Largest city: Monticello

Government
  - Judge/Executive: Scott Gehring (R)

Area
  - Total: 484 sq mi (1,250 km^{2})
  - Land: 458 sq mi (1,190 km^{2})
  - Water: 26 sq mi (67 km^{2}) 5.4%

Population (2020)
  - Total: 19,555
  - Estimate (2025): 19,597 ▲
  - Density: 42.7/sq mi (16.5/km^{2})
- Time zone: UTC−5 (Eastern)
  - Summer (DST): UTC−4 (EDT)
- Congressional district: 5th
- Website: waynecounty.ky.gov/Pages/default.aspx

Wayne County is a county in the U.S. state of Kentucky along the southern border with Tennessee. As of the 2020 census, the population was 19,555. Its county seat is Monticello. The county, on the south-central border with Tennessee, was named for Gen. Anthony Wayne, a Revolutionary War hero. As of November 3, 2020, Wayne County is a wet county—a measure allowing the sales and consumption of alcoholic drinks passed by a margin of 4,901 for and 3,966 against.

== History ==
The first known European-American settlers to visit the area were longhunters who arrived in the 1770s. They established a temporary camp near Mill Springs on the Cumberland River. Benjamin Price built a log cabin in 1775, and Price's Station became one of the earliest Kentucky settlements. This was still an area of Cherokee homeland territory, and conflicts arose between the groups as more Americans settled here.

Many Revolutionary War veterans followed Price, including Joshua Jones, who arrived in 1794, Jonathan and James Ingram in 1796, Cornelius Phillips in 1798, and Isaac West in 1799. Veterans, they had each been given land grants in the area, in lieu of back salary payments by the United States government from the war.

Wayne County was formed December 13, 1800, from Pulaski and Cumberland counties. It was the 43rd county in the state and is named for General "Mad Anthony" Wayne, a hero of the American Revolution and the Northwest Indian War. Wayne's victory at the Battle of Fallen Timbers virtually ended the Indian threat against Kentucky settlers.

The area was developed for agriculture, and planters used enslaved African Americans as laborers. Early in the Civil War, Confederate Army General Felix Zollicoffer made his headquarters in the Brown-Lanier House at Mill Springs. He was killed at the Battle of Mill Springs on January 19, 1862, when he mistook some Union troops for his own and approached them. The Union men shot him dead, and without their leader, the Confederate were defeated.

During the winter of 1861, the Confederate Government Of Kentucky issued an act to rename Wayne County to Zollicoffer County in honor of Felix Zollicoffer, who died at the Battle of Mill Springs.

== Geography ==
According to the United States Census Bureau, the county has a total area of 484 square miles (1,250 km^{2}), of which 458 square miles (1,190 km^{2}) is land and 26 square miles (67 km^{2}) (5.4%) is water.

The county's elevation ranges from 656 to 1,870 feet (200 to 570 m) ASL, at the Monticello/Wayne County Airport the elevation is 963 feet (294 m). Wayne County is located in the Pennyrile Plateau (image) and Eastern Coal Field (image) regions of Kentucky.

=== Adjacent counties ===
- Russell County - northwest/CST Border
- Pulaski County - northeast
- McCreary County - east
- Scott County, Tennessee - southeast
- Pickett County, Tennessee - south/CST Border
- Clinton County - west/CST Border

=== National protected area ===
- Daniel Boone National Forest (part)

=== Time zone boundary ===
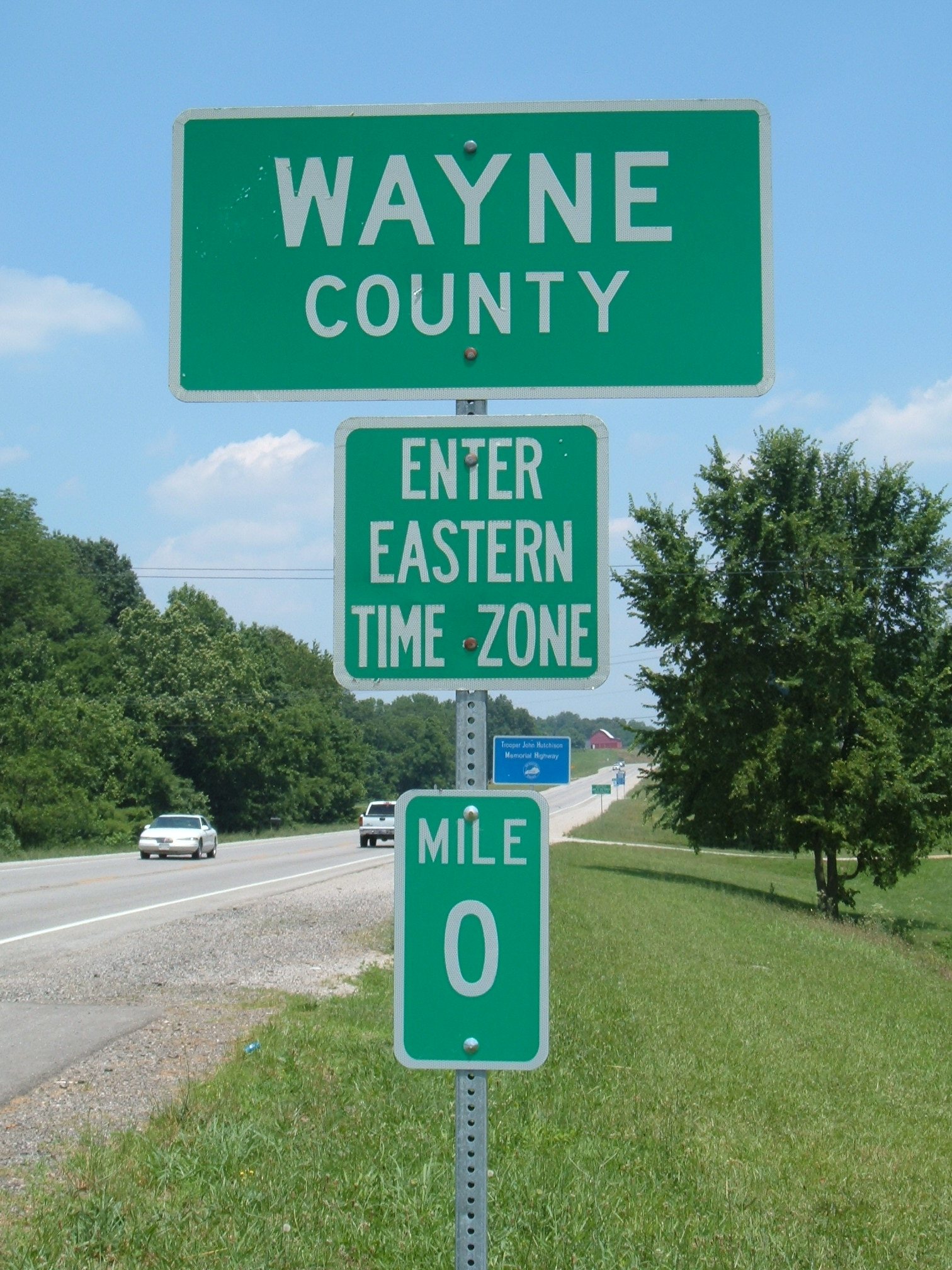
Along KY 90

Wayne County is on Eastern Time; however, its western border, shared with Clinton and Russell Counties, is part of the Eastern/Central time zone boundary, as is its southern border with Pickett County, TN. Wayne County observed Central time until October 2000; an account of this change is documented in an article by Dr. Stanley Brunn of the University of Kentucky.

The county has the tz database zone identifier America/Kentucky/Monticello.

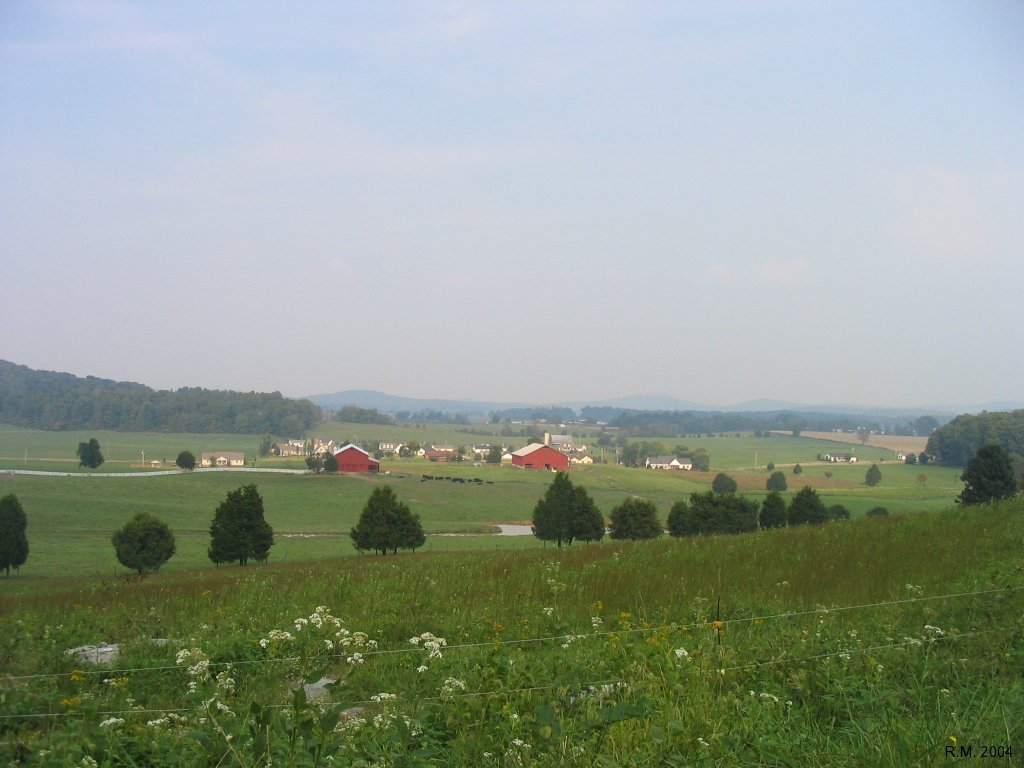
Farmland in Wayne County

== Demographics ==
Historical population
Census	Pop.	Note	%±
1810	5,430		—
1820	7,951		46.4%
1830	8,685		9.2%
1840	7,399		−14.8%
1850	8,692		17.5%
1860	10,259		18.0%
1870	10,602		3.3%
1880	12,512		18.0%
1890	12,852		2.7%
1900	14,892		15.9%
1910	17,518		17.6%
1920	16,208		−7.5%
1930	15,848		−2.2%
1940	17,204		8.6%
1950	16,475		−4.2%
1960	14,700		−10.8%
1970	14,268		−2.9%
1980	17,022		19.3%
1990	17,468		2.6%
2000	19,923		14.1%
2010	20,813		4.5%
2020	19,555		−6.0%
2025 (est.)	19,597	▲	0.2%
US Decennial Census; 1790-1960 1900-1990; 1990-2000 2010-2020

=== 2020 census ===
As of the 2020 census, the county had a population of 19,555. The median age was 43.0 years. 22.7% of residents were under the age of 18 and 20.1% of residents were 65 years of age or older. For every 100 females there were 98.2 males, and for every 100 females age 18 and over there were 95.7 males age 18 and over.

The racial makeup of the county was 92.8% White, 1.2% Black or African American, 0.3% American Indian and Alaska Native, 0.3% Asian, 0.0% Native Hawaiian and Pacific Islander, 2.3% from some other race, and 3.1% from two or more races. Hispanic or Latino residents of any race comprised 4.6% of the population.

34.2% of residents lived in urban areas, while 65.8% lived in rural areas.

There were 8,085 households in the county, of which 28.0% had children under the age of 18 living with them and 27.2% had a female householder with no spouse or partner present. About 29.9% of all households were made up of individuals and 14.5% had someone living alone who was 65 years of age or older.

There were 10,105 housing units, of which 20.0% were vacant. Among occupied housing units, 70.6% were owner-occupied and 29.4% were renter-occupied. The homeowner vacancy rate was 1.2% and the rental vacancy rate was 6.0%.

=== 2000 census ===
As of the census of 2000, there were 19,923 people, 7,913 households, and 5,808 families in the county. The population density was 43 per square mile (17/km^{2}). There were 9,789 housing units at an average density of 21 per square mile (8.1/km^{2}). The racial makeup of the county was 96.98% White, 1.49% Black or African American, 0.18% Native American, 0.11% Asian, 0.47% from other races, and 0.78% from two or more races. 1.46% of the population were Hispanic or Latino any race.

There were 7,913 households, out of which 33.40% had children under the age of 18 living with them, 58.90% were married couples living together, 10.60% had a female householder with no husband present, and 26.60% were non-families. 23.90% of all households were made up of individuals, and 10.40% had someone living alone who was 65 years of age or older. The average household size was 2.49 and the average family size was 2.94.

The county population contained 25.30% under the age of 18, 8.90% from 18 to 24, 28.10% from 25 to 44, 24.00% from 45 to 64, and 13.60% who were 65 years of age or older. The median age was 37 years. For every 100 females there were 97.80 males. For every 100 females age 18 and over, there were 94.90 males.

The median income for a household in the county was $20,863, and the median income for a family was $24,869. Males had a median income of $24,021 versus $18,102 for females. The per capita income for the county was $12,601. About 24.60% of families and 29.40% of the population were below the poverty line, including 34.90% of those under age 18 and 31.50% of those over age 64.

== Notable people ==
- Dick Burnett, partially blind fiddle player who wrote the popular song "Man of Constant Sorrow" in the early 1900s. Burnett also played the guitar and banjo, and made several highly regarded recordings in the late 1920s. Born near Monticello in 1883.
- Emry Arthur, early folk and country musician and recording artist active in the 1920s and 1930s. Born in 1902 in the Elk Spring Valley area of the county. Recorded a popular version of Burnett's "Man of Constant Sorrow" in 1928.
- Polly Berry, an enslaved woman in St. Louis, Missouri, who gained freedom for both herself and her daughter through two freedom suits in court. She had lived as a child in Wayne County before her master took her to Illinois (a free state) and Missouri.
- Lettice Bryan, author of The Kentucky Housewife (1839), a popular cookbook, lived in Wayne County in the 1830s and 1840s when her cookbook was published.
- Shelby M. Cullom (1829–1914), Governor of Illinois (1877–1883); U. S. Senator (1883–1913)
- Preston H. Leslie (1819–1907) - Governor of Kentucky (1871–1875); Governor of Montana (1887–1889)
- Harriette Simpson Arnow (1908–1986) was an American novelist and historian, who was born in Monticello, Wayne County, Kentucky.
- Hal Rogers, US Congressman (1981–present)
- Kenny Davis, US Olympic basketball player (1972)
- John S. Van Winkle, former Secretary of State of Kentucky
- Ephraim L. Van Winkle, former Secretary of State of Kentucky

== Historical attractions ==
- William Crenshaw Kennedy, Jr. Memorial Museum and Genealogy Library
- Doughboy Monument, located on the Monticello town square, in honor of World War I soldiers
- Mill Springs Mill (1877) and Park, a water-powered overshot gristmill that is still operating
- Brown-Lanier House - Historic home associated with the Civil War Battle of Mill Springs/Logan's Crossroads
- Raccoon John Smith Cabin - early home of religious leader and Restoration Movement founder

== Politics ==
United States presidential election results for Wayne County, Kentucky
Year	Republican		Democratic		Third party(ies)	
Year	No.	%	No.	%	No.	%
1912	1,096	28.83%	2,168	57.02%	538	14.15%
1916	1,638	53.99%	1,373	45.25%	23	0.76%
1920	2,992	61.70%	1,827	37.68%	30	0.62%
1924	2,436	54.31%	2,020	45.04%	29	0.65%
1928	2,907	63.89%	1,635	35.93%	8	0.18%
1932	2,682	47.50%	2,929	51.88%	35	0.62%
1936	2,924	53.36%	2,546	46.46%	10	0.18%
1940	3,177	55.72%	2,519	44.18%	6	0.11%
1944	3,048	60.12%	2,022	39.88%	0	0.00%
1948	2,480	54.07%	2,029	44.23%	78	1.70%
1952	3,396	57.94%	2,461	41.99%	4	0.07%
1956	3,609	61.15%	2,263	38.34%	30	0.51%
1960	3,973	66.92%	1,964	33.08%	0	0.00%
1964	2,389	46.44%	2,737	53.21%	18	0.35%
1968	3,055	61.08%	1,467	29.33%	480	9.60%
1972	3,514	64.83%	1,853	34.19%	53	0.98%
1976	3,243	55.75%	2,537	43.61%	37	0.64%
1980	3,972	59.14%	2,673	39.80%	71	1.06%
1984	4,449	66.00%	2,277	33.78%	15	0.22%
1988	3,672	63.89%	2,057	35.79%	18	0.31%
1992	3,412	52.44%	2,516	38.67%	579	8.90%
1996	3,122	51.56%	2,422	40.00%	511	8.44%
2000	4,069	62.85%	2,312	35.71%	93	1.44%
2004	5,027	65.41%	2,616	34.04%	42	0.55%
2008	4,868	67.65%	2,201	30.59%	127	1.76%
2012	5,289	73.36%	1,855	25.73%	66	0.92%
2016	6,371	79.72%	1,431	17.91%	190	2.38%
2020	7,430	80.41%	1,700	18.40%	110	1.19%
2024	7,203	82.48%	1,444	16.53%	86	0.98%

=== Elected officials ===
Elected officials as of January 3, 2025
U.S. House	Hal Rogers (R)	KY 5
Ky. Senate	Rick Girdler (R)	15
Ky. House	Ken Upchurch (R)	52

== Communities ==
=== City ===
- Monticello (county seat)

=== Unincorporated communities ===
- Barrier
- Big Sinking
- Cooper
- Duncan Valley
- Fall Creek
- Frazer
- Frisby
- Hidalgo
- Mill Springs
- Parmleysville
- Powersburg
- Rockybranch
- Roger's Grove
- Steubenville
- Sunnybrook
- Windy

== Education ==
Wayne County Schools operates the county's public schools.

On June 30, 2013 Monticello Independent Schools merged into Wayne County schools.

Vocational education in the county has been provided by Wayne County Vocational School from 1971 to the present. Its name has changed several times during that period; it is presently knows as Wayne County Area Technology Center (ATC). It is managed by The Office Of Career And Technical Education. The school serves secondary students enrolled in Wayne County High School. Programs include Health Science, Welding, Carpentry, Machine Tool, Automotive, Industrial Maintenance, and Business.

== See also ==
- National Register of Historic Places listings in Wayne County, Kentucky
- Ken Upchurch - member of the Kentucky House of Representatives from Wayne County
