= Old Wayne County High School =

- Wayne County High School
- U.S. National Register of Historic Places
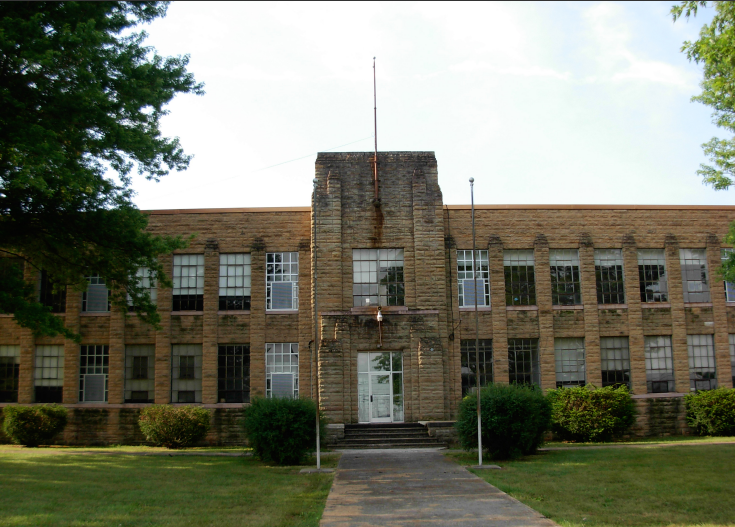

- Location within Kentucky Location within the United States
- Location: 80 A.J. Lloyd Cir., Monticello, Kentucky
- Coordinates: 36°49′28″N 84°51′41″W
- Area: less than one acre
- Built: 1941
- Architect: Graff, R.F.; Graff, Herbert
- Architectural style: Art Deco
- NRHP reference No.: 13000567
- Added to NRHP: July 30, 2013

The Wayne County High School, at 80 A.J. Lloyd Cir. in Monticello, Kentucky, was built in 1941. It was listed on the National Register of Historic Places in 2013.

It has also been known as A.J. Lloyd Middle School.

It is Art Deco in style. It was built during 1939–41 with funding from the Works Progress Administration. It was deemed to have "played a significant role in education in the community" and to have "reshaped the delivery of public education in the county". The school replaced four separate high schools. "'The educational advantages given by a consolidated high school provided students with an ability to conceive of life away from Wayne County and an education upon which to begin that journey.'"

== See also ==
- Lloyd Memorial High School, in Erlanger, Kentucky
