= Monticello, Kentucky =

- City
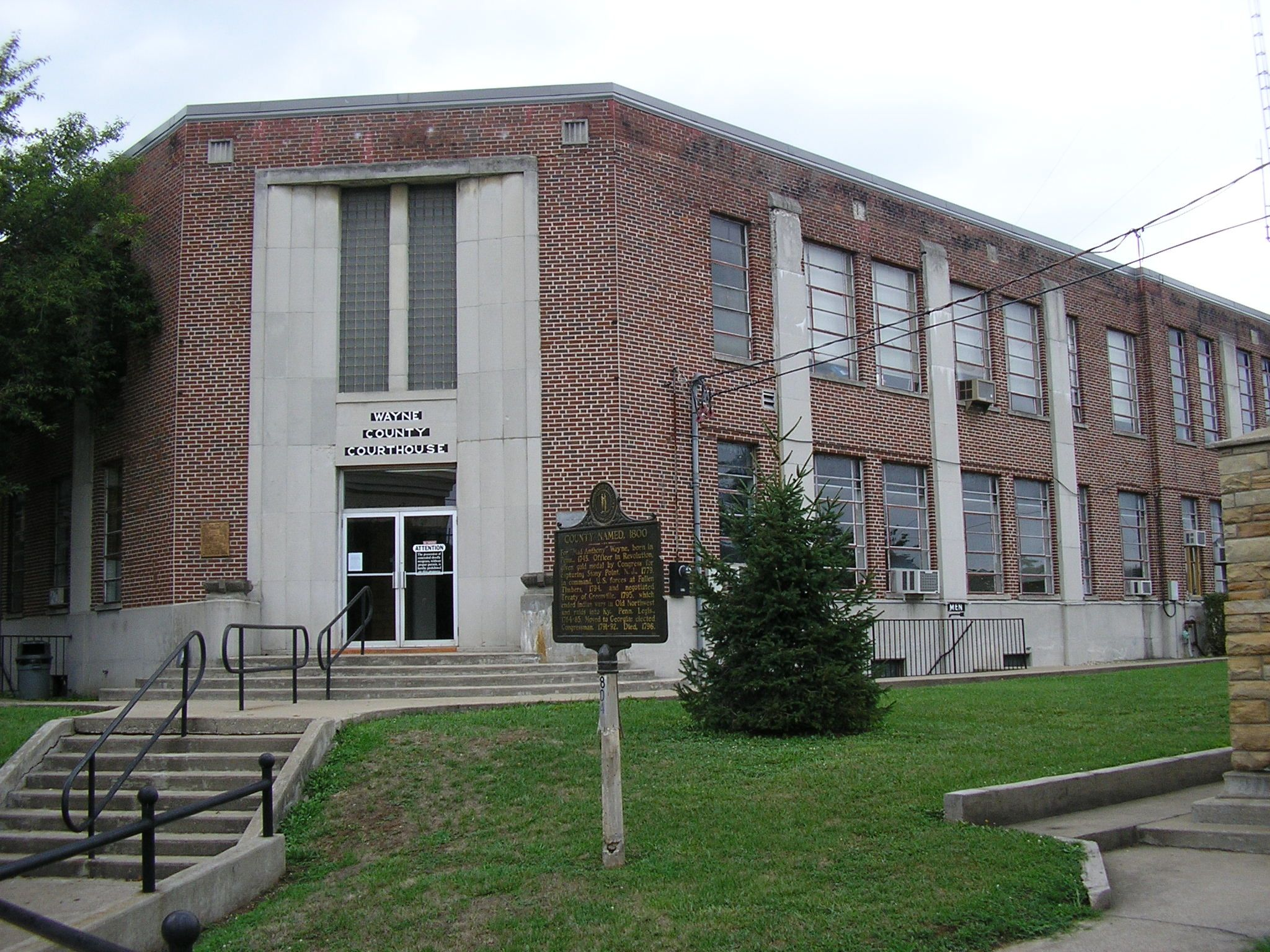
- Wayne County courthouse in Monticello
- Nickname: "Houseboat Manufacturing Capital of the World"
- Location of Monticello in Wayne County, Kentucky
- Coordinates: 36°50′28″N 84°51′01″W
- Country: United States
- State: Kentucky
- County: Wayne
- Incorporated: 1801
- Named for: Pres. Thomas Jefferson's Virginia home

Government
  - Mayor: Kenny Catron

Area
  - Total: 6.13 sq mi (15.88 km^{2})
  - Land: 6.09 sq mi (15.77 km^{2})
  - Water: 0.042 sq mi (0.11 km^{2})
- Elevation: 974 ft (297 m)

Population (2020)
  - Total: 5,753
  - Estimate (2024): 5,726
  - Density: 944.7/sq mi (364.76/km^{2})
- Time zone: UTC-5 (Eastern (EST))
  - Summer (DST): UTC-4 (EDT)
- ZIP code: 42633
- Area code: 606
- FIPS code: 21-53130
- GNIS feature ID: 2404291
- Website: www.monticelloky.gov

Monticello is a city in Wayne County, Kentucky, United States. It is the seat of its county. Its population was 5,753 at the time of the 2020 United States census.

Monticello claims to be "the Houseboat Capital of the World", as numerous houseboat manufacturers operate in the city. The city is located along Lake Cumberland. Its economy is built on serving the recreational and tourist traffic to the lake.

== Geography ==
According to the United States Census Bureau, the city has a total area of 6.1 square miles (16 km^{2}), all land.

Monticello is located near the center of Wayne County, along Elk Creek, a tributary of Beaver Creek, which flows westward into Lake Cumberland. State highways 92, 90, and 167 were constructed to intersect at the county seat.

== History ==
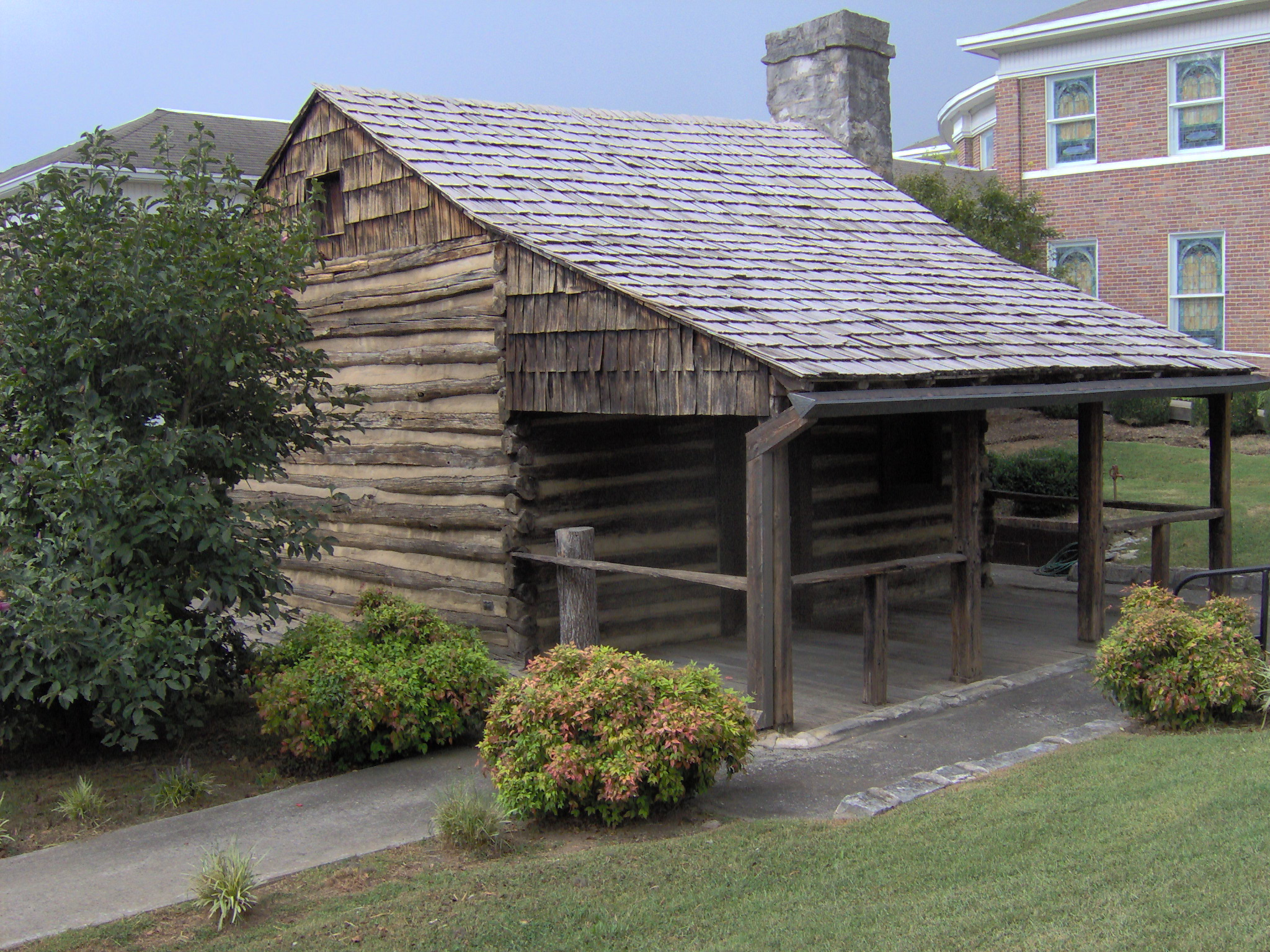
This log cabin in downtown Monticello, Kentucky, was built in the early 19th century by "Raccoon" John Smith (1784–1868). The cabin was originally located in Horse Hollow on the Little South Fork River.

Monticello was designated as the county seat when the Wayne County was formed in 1800. The first Wayne county clerk, Micah Taul, named the town after Thomas Jefferson's plantation and home; Jefferson was elected President of the United States that year. Joshua Jones, a surveyor and Revolutionary War veteran, laid out the town on 13 acres owned by William Beard. By 1810, the population numbered 27.

In the late 1800s, oil was discovered in Wayne County, creating an economic boost. Drilling began in these local oil fields in the 1880s, and was renewed in 1921 and 1922.

Electricity was introduced to the city in 1905. City water was installed in 1929. Manufacturing dominated the economy from the late 1950s and 1960s until the late 20th and early 21st centuries.

In 1973, Belden Corporation (wire and cable) employed 300 people, Gamble Brothers (wood products) employed 161 people, Waterbury Garment (clothing) employed 271 people, and Monticello Manufacturing (clothing) employed 240 people. Each of these companies has left Monticello.

== Demographics ==
Historical population
Census	Pop.	Note	%±
1810	37		—
1830	205		—
1840	142		−30.7%
1880	354		—
1890	413		16.7%
1900	546		32.2%
1910	1,338		145.1%
1920	1,514		13.2%
1930	1,503		−0.7%
1940	1,733		15.3%
1950	2,934		69.3%
1960	2,940		0.2%
1970	3,618		23.1%
1980	5,677		56.9%
1990	5,357		−5.6%
2000	5,981		11.6%
2010	6,188		3.5%
2020	5,753		−7.0%
2024 (est.)	5,726		−0.5%
U.S. Decennial Census

=== 2020 census ===
As of the 2020 census, Monticello had a population of 5,753. The median age was 38.5 years. 23.9% of residents were under the age of 18 and 18.9% of residents were 65 years of age or older. For every 100 females there were 93.8 males, and for every 100 females age 18 and over there were 90.3 males age 18 and over.

98.5% of residents lived in urban areas, while 1.5% lived in rural areas.

There were 2,340 households in Monticello, of which 28.8% had children under the age of 18 living in them. Of all households, 37.0% were married-couple households, 19.5% were households with a male householder and no spouse or partner present, and 35.7% were households with a female householder and no spouse or partner present. About 34.8% of all households were made up of individuals and 17.1% had someone living alone who was 65 years of age or older.

There were 2,542 housing units, of which 7.9% were vacant. The homeowner vacancy rate was 1.5% and the rental vacancy rate was 6.5%.

Racial composition as of the 2020 census
Race	Number	Percent
White	5,030	87.4%
Black or African American	135	2.3%
American Indian and Alaska Native	23	0.4%
Asian	25	0.4%
Native Hawaiian and Other Pacific Islander	0	0.0%
Some other race	321	5.6%
Two or more races	219	3.8%
Hispanic or Latino (of any race)	562	9.8%

=== 2000 census ===
As of the census of 2000, 5,981 people, 2,508 households, and 1,635 families resided in the city. The population density was 984.3 inhabitants per square mile (380.0/km^{2}). The 2,730 housing units had an average density of 449.3 per square mile (173.5/km^{2}). The racial makeup of the city was 94.63% White, 2.42% African American, 0.40% Native American, 0.28% Asian, 1.34% from other races, and 0.92% from two or more races. Hispanic or Latino people of any race were 2.96% of the population.

Of the 2,508 households, 31.3% had children under 18 living with them, 46.7% were married couples living together, 14.9% had a female householder with no husband present, and 34.8% were not families. About 31.7% of all households were made up of individuals, and 16.0% had someone living alone who was 65 or older. The average household size was 2.33 and the average family size was 2.91.

In the city, the age distribution was 25.0% under 18, 9.7% from 18 to 24, 25.9% from 25 to 44, 21.9% from 45 to 64, and 17.4% who were 65 or older. The median age was 36 years. For every 100 females, there were 88.9 males. For every 100 females 18 and over, there were 84.5 males.

The median income for a household in the city was $17,4 23, and for a family was $24,460. Males had a median income of $28,638 versus $19,259 for females. The per capita income for the city was $11,855. About 29.2% of families and 34.1% of the population were below the poverty line, including 39.9% of those under 18 and 35.4% of those 65 or over.

== Education ==
As of June 30, 2013, it is served by Wayne County Schools.

The first recorded school in Wayne County was opened around 1800 by Robert Ferrill, a well-educated wheelwright who had a few good books. Monticello's first school was opened in 1807 by Rodes Garth, who taught "Roman history, the Scriptures, orthography, and pronunciation." In 1819, Yale graduate John S. Frisbie began a school with Michael Huffaker as the first teacher of record. The Monticello Academy was established in 1830 with John Lankford as the headmaster, followed by Professor Mullins, and later William Burton.

In 1843, under the guidance of Commissioners Micajah Phillips, John Rousseau, Martin Beaty, and Francis Goddard, the county voted and ratified to organize into common school districts. The first examiners for receiving a teaching certificate were physician Jonathan S. Frisbie, lawyer John Lankford, and teacher Littleton Beard. By 1842, 16 schoolhouses had been built in Wayne County, three listed within several miles of Monticello. Teachers at these schools before the Civil War include Amanda McGee, William and Thomas Simpson, Joseph Ballou, and Marcellus Baugh. In these early schools, textbooks were scarce, but included Dilworth's Spelling Book, Murray's English Reader and English Grammar, Noble Butler's Goodrich Readers and Grammar, and the McGuffey's Readers. The first school superintendent of Wayne County was Robert McBeath, a "member of a family noted for their intellectual qualities." His son, Tom McBeath, moved on to be president of Florida State University.

In 1866, following the Civil War, the Kendrick Academy opened in Monticello with Milton Elliott as principal. Teachers in Monticello in the 1860s and '70s include Marion Huffaker, Marshall Stone, and Ala Shearer. Ones in the 1880s and '90s include Lucy and Amanda Taylor, Sallie and Eula Kendrick, Emma Kelley, Fount Cooper, William Sandusky, Tobias Huffaker, and Mollie Denny, who became the Wayne County superintendent. In 1872, the Kendrick Academy closed due to a fire.

In 1879, a girls' school was opened by Roxie Buchanan, followed by William Bradshaw, and in 1885, W.T. Chaffin opened Classical High School with teachers T. Leigh Thompson, T. C. Job, and Georgia Brock; and around 1890 added kindergarten and primary schools with teachers Ms. Oakley and Graves. Successive principals at the school until the close of the 19th century were W. T. Chafin, T. Leigh Thompson, Professor H. C. Jones, Hayden Grubbs, Professor Chafin again, and finally Mr. Ballard.

From 1905 until 2013, Monticello had Monticello Independent Schools, its own school district independent of the surrounding Wayne County Schools.

=== Vocational education ===
Wayne County Vocational School has served students of Wayne County since 1971. The school has had many name changes over the years and is currently named Wayne County Area Technology Center (ATC).Wayne County ATC moved to its new location at 38 Academic Ave in 2020 and adopted Wayne County High School Tech programs Agricultural, JAG, Health Science and Computer Science. Wayne County ATC is managed by the Office of Career and Technical Education. The school serves secondary students enrolled in Wayne County High School. Programs include Health Science, Welding, Carpentry, Machine Tool Automotive Technology, 3D printing/Computer Science Technology, JAG, Agriculture, Industrial Maintenance, and Office Technology.

== State government representatives ==
Max Wise of Campbellsville is the current Kentucky state senator, representing District 16, which includes Wayne, Adair, Clinton, Cumberland, McCreary, Russell, and Taylor Counties. The District 52 Kentucky House of Representatives seat is held by Ken Upchurch of Monticello. District 52 includes Wayne County, McCreary County, and part of Pulaski County.

== Notable people ==
- Dick Burnett (1883–1977), folk musician
- Mark Cole, member Virginia House of Delegates
- Shelby Moore Cullom (1829–1914), United States senator, congressman, and the 17th governor of Illinois from 1877 to 1883
- Kevin Denney, country music artist
- Sara Beth Gregory, member Kentucky House of Representatives, Kentucky Senate, and circuit judge
- Walter Dee Huddleston (1926–2018), U.S. Senator from Kentucky
- Martin Massengale (born 1933), president of the University of Nebraska system from 1989 to 1994
- Louise Slaughter (1929–2018), U.S. congresswoman from New York
- Ken Upchurch (born 1969), member Kentucky House of Representatives
- Thomas Hansford Williams (1828–1886), former attorney general of California
- Lettice Bryan, author of The Kentucky Housewife (1839), a popular cookbook, lived in Wayne County in the 1830s and 1840s when her cookbook was published
