= Battle of Mill Springs order of battle: Union =

The following Union Army units and commanders fought in the Battle of Mill Springs during the American Civil War on January 19, 1862, near present-day Nancy, Kentucky. The Confederate order of battle is listed separately.

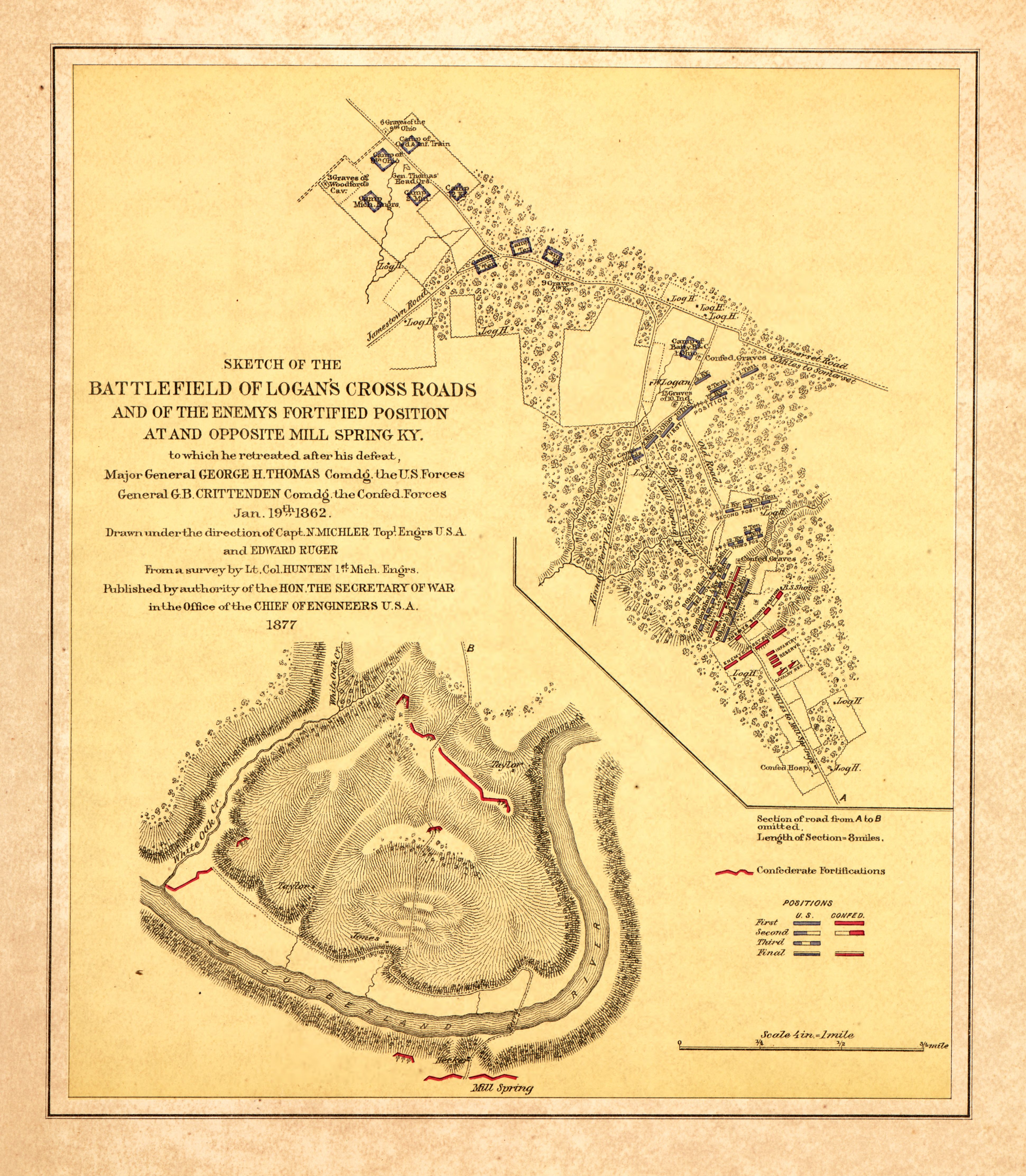
Sketch of the battlefield depicting the direction of battle and Confederate fortifications

== Abbreviations used ==
=== Military rank ===
- BG = Brigadier General
- Col = Colonel
- Ltc = Lieutenant Colonel
- Maj = Major
- Cpt = Captain

=== Other ===
- w = wounded

== First Division, Army of the Ohio ==
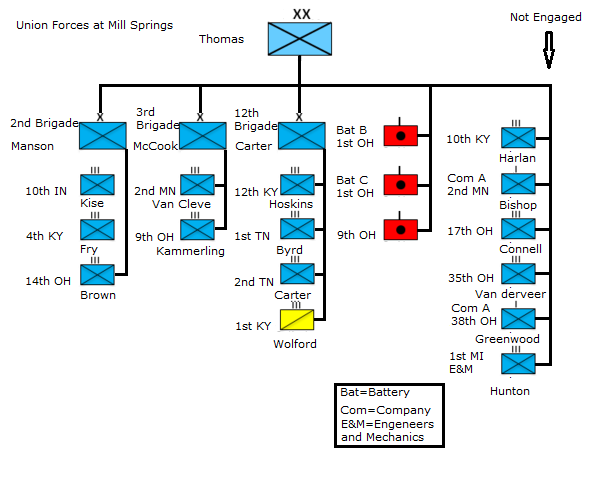
Union order of battle at Mill Springs

BG George Henry Thomas

Brigade	Regiments and Other
Second Brigade Col Mahlon Dickerson Manson, acting BG	10th Indiana Infantry: Ltc William Coalbaugh Kise; 4th Kentucky Infantry: Col Speed Smith Fry (w)
Third Brigade Col Robert Latimer McCook (w), acting BG	2nd Minnesota Infantry (9 companies, B—K): Col Horatio Phillips Van Cleve; 9th Ohio Infantry: Maj Gustave Kämmerling, acting Ltc
Twelfth Brigade Col Samuel Perry Carter, acting BG	12th Kentucky Infantry: Col William Anderson Hoskins; 1st Tennessee Infantry: Col Robert King Bird; 2nd Tennessee Infantry: Col James Patton Taylor Carter
Cavalry	1st Kentucky Cavalry (companies A, B, C and H): Col Frank Lane Wolford
Artillery	Battery B, 1st Ohio Artillery: Cpt William Edward Standart; Battery C, 1st Ohio Artillery: Cpt Dennis Kenny Jr.; 9th Ohio Battery: Cpt Henry Shepard Wetmore

=== Nearby troops not engaged ===
- 1st Michigan Engineers & Mechanics, Companies D, F, G: Ltc Kinsman Adenis Hunton (camp guard)
- 2nd Minnesota Infantry, Company A: Cpt Judson Wade Bishop (on picket duty; engaged in pursuit to Beech Grove)
- 10th Kentucky Infantry: Col John Marshall Harlan (engaged in pursuit to Beech Grove)
- 14th Ohio Infantry: Col James Blair Steedman (engaged in pursuit to Beech Grove)
- 17th Ohio Infantry: Col John McNeill Connell (advanced to Beech Grove during night of January 19)
- 31st Ohio Infantry: Col Moses Bascom Walker (advanced to Beech Grove during night of January 19)
- 35th Ohio Infantry: Col Ferdinand Van Derveer (advanced to Beech Grove during night of January 19)
- 38th Ohio Infantry: Col Edwin D. Bradley (regiment remained at Somerset, Company A under Cpt Charles Greenwood served as camp guard on the 19th at Logan's Cross Roads)
- 18th U.S. Infantry: Col Henry Beebee Carrington (absent), Ltc Oliver Lathrop Shepherd (marching east towards Logan's Cross Roads)
- 19th Kentucky Infantry: Col William Jennings Landram (regiment remained near Somerset, later destroyed Confederate earthworks at Beech Grove)
- 1st Kentucky Light Artillery, Battery B: Cpt John M. Hewitt (advanced to Beech Grove during night of January 19)
