= Battle of Mill Springs order of battle =

The order of battle for the Battle of Mill Springs includes:

- Battle of Mill Springs order of battle: Confederate
- Battle of Mill Springs order of battle: Union
