= Mill Springs Battlefield National Monument =

- U.S. National Register of Historic Places
- U.S. National Historic Landmark District
- U.S. National Monument
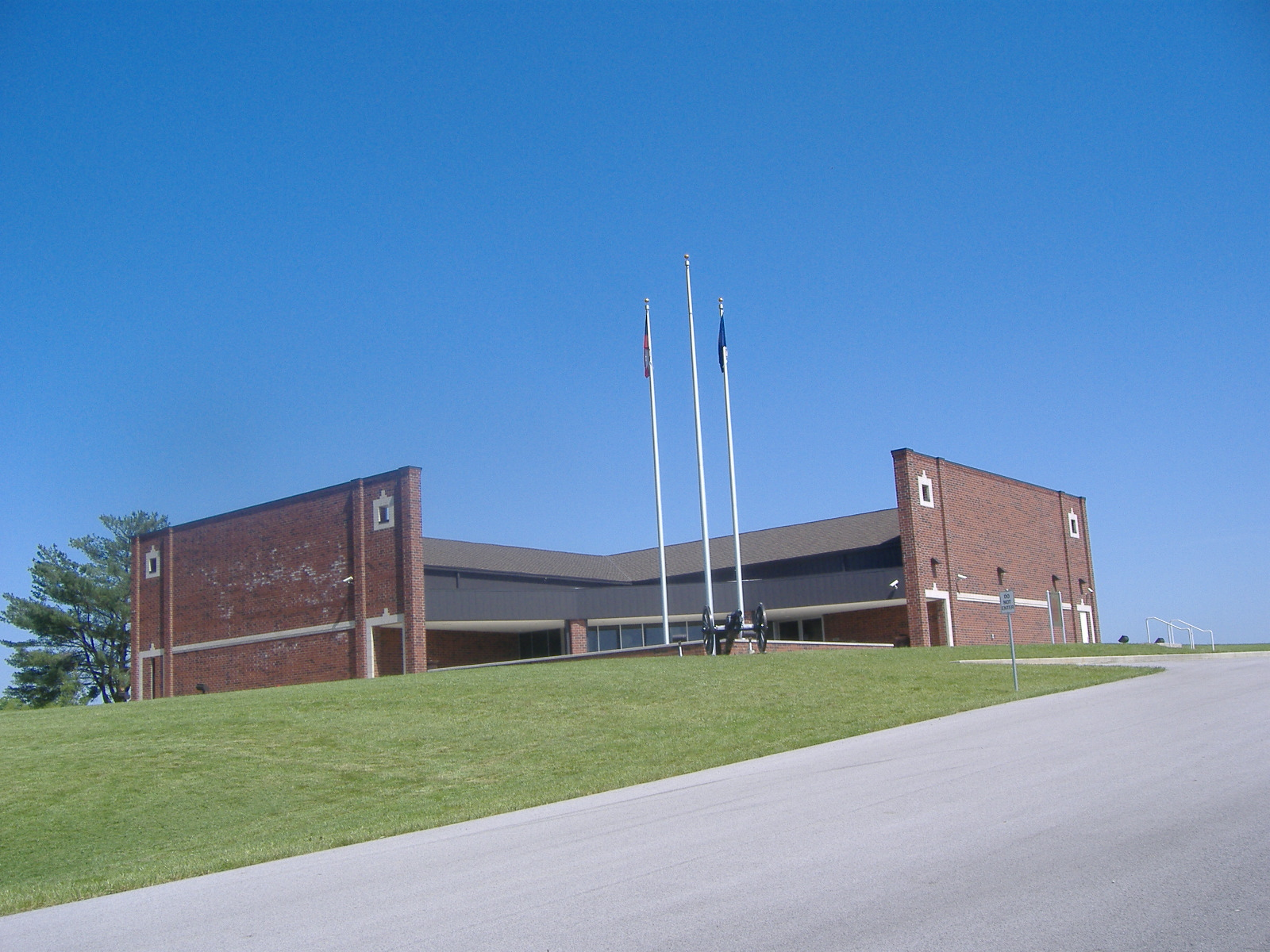
- Visitor center

- Location within Kentucky Location within the United States
- Location: Pulaski / Wayne counties, Kentucky, US
- Nearest city: Somerset, Kentucky
- Coordinates: 37°04′08″N 84°44′10″W
- Area: 1,459.19 acres (5.9051 km^{2})
- Visitation: 10,527 (2025)
- NRHP reference No.: 93000001
- Added to NRHP: February 18, 1993

The Mill Springs Battlefield National Monument was the location of the Battle of Mill Springs (also known as Battle of Fishing Creek and as Battle of Logan's Crossroads) in January 1862. It was declared to be a U.S. National Historic Landmark in 1993 and authorized as a national monument in 2019. After acquisition of property by the National Park Service it was established as a unit on September 22, 2020.

Several separated areas related to the battle have been listed on the National Register of Historic Places: the Confederate Mass Grave Monument in Somerset, Gen. Felix K. Zollicoffer Monument, West-Metcalfe House, and the Mill Springs National Cemetery.

== Area ==
The initial designated area for the National Register of Historic Places included three separate areas: the battlefield, and two separate areas with Confederate fortifications on each side of Lake Cumberland (one near Mill Springs, and the other by Beech Grove). The three separate areas amounted to 647.3 acres (2.620 km^{2}) of land, most of which is in Pulaski County, Kentucky (the battlefield), with the rest in Wayne County, Kentucky. The main difference in the land from 1862 to the modern day is that the landscape is less wooded. Also the name of the town during the battle was Logan's Crossing, when became Nancy. There are no buildings left that were standing during the war, although none of the modern buildings seriously detracted from the area's National Register status. Two of the 29 noncontributing structures on the battlefield during the nomination were later placed on the National Register; both were monuments placed on the battlefield in 1910.

The American Battlefield Trust and its partners have preserved 769 acres of the Mill Springs Battlefield in 20 transactions from 1993 through mid-2023.

== Visitor Center and Museum ==
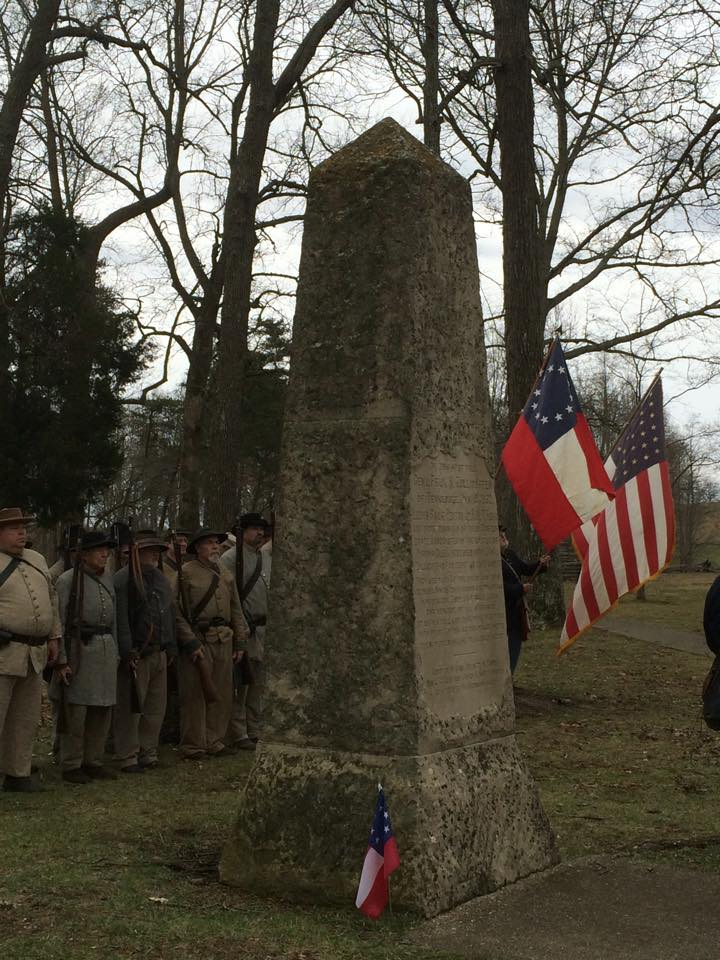
Ceremony at the Zollicoffer Monument

The Mill Springs Battlefield Visitors Center and Museum commemorates the January 1862 Battle of Mill Springs, fought during the early days of the American Civil War. The museum is located in Nancy, Kentucky, just past the northern edge of the battlefield, overlooking where Union forces camped. It is adjacent to the Mill Springs National Cemetery, which contains the Federal interments (the Confederate burials are at Zollicoffer Park, a short distance away, on the battlefield proper). The museum was formally dedicated on November 4, 2006.

On January 15, 2013, Kentucky Representative Hal Rogers introduced the bill H.R. 298, officially titled "To direct the Secretary of the Interior to conduct a special resource study to evaluate the significance of the Mill Springs Battlefield located in Pulaski and Wayne Counties, Kentucky, and the feasibility of its inclusion in the National Park System, and for other purposes," into the United States Congress. Rogers said that "the Battle of Mill Springs is a source of great pride and interest to the people I serve." Rogers argued that the battlefield was a "jewel" and would be "an excellent addition to the National Park Service." The bill passed the House by voice vote but did not pass the Senate.

The Department of the Interior, in a statement given at a subcommittee hearing, said that it "supports" the enactment, but believes that "priority should be given to the 28 previously authorized studies for potential units of the National Park System, potential new National Heritage Areas, and potential additions to the National Trails System and National Wild and Scenic Rivers System that have not yet been transmitted to the Congress."

The John D. Dingell Jr. Conservation, Management, and Recreation Act, signed into law March 12, 2019, authorized it as a national monument, established upon acquisition of property by the National Park Service.

== See also ==
- List of national monuments of the United States
- West-Metcalfe House, headquarters of Zollicoffer before the battle, also listed on the National Register
