= West-Metcalfe House =

- U.S. National Register of Historic Places
- Location within Kentucky Location within the United States
- Location: Off Kentucky Route 80, 1.75 miles (2.82 km) south of Mill Springs, Kentucky
- Coordinates: 36°55′10″N 84°46′39″W
- Area: 2 acres (0.81 ha)
- Built: 1800
- NRHP reference No.: 77000661
- Added to NRHP: November 17, 1977

The West-Metcalfe House, in Wayne County, Kentucky, about 1.75 miles (2.82 km) south of Mill Springs on the Cumberland River, was built in 1800. It was listed on the National Register of Historic Places in 1977.

It served in December 1861 as the headquarters for Confederate general Felix Zollicoffer before the Battle of Logan's Crossroads (also known as Battle of Mill Springs and as Battle of Fishing Creek), a disastrous defeat for the Confederates delivered by Union forces of George H. Thomas.

It is a one-and-a-half-story Georgian-style brick house.

It was built by Captain Isaac West (1768–1830), a Kentucky state legislator and prominent local citizen.

== See also ==
- Battle of Mill Springs Historic Areas, also listed on the National Register and a National Historic Landmark
