= Confederate Mass Grave Monument in Somerset =

- U.S. National Register of Historic Places
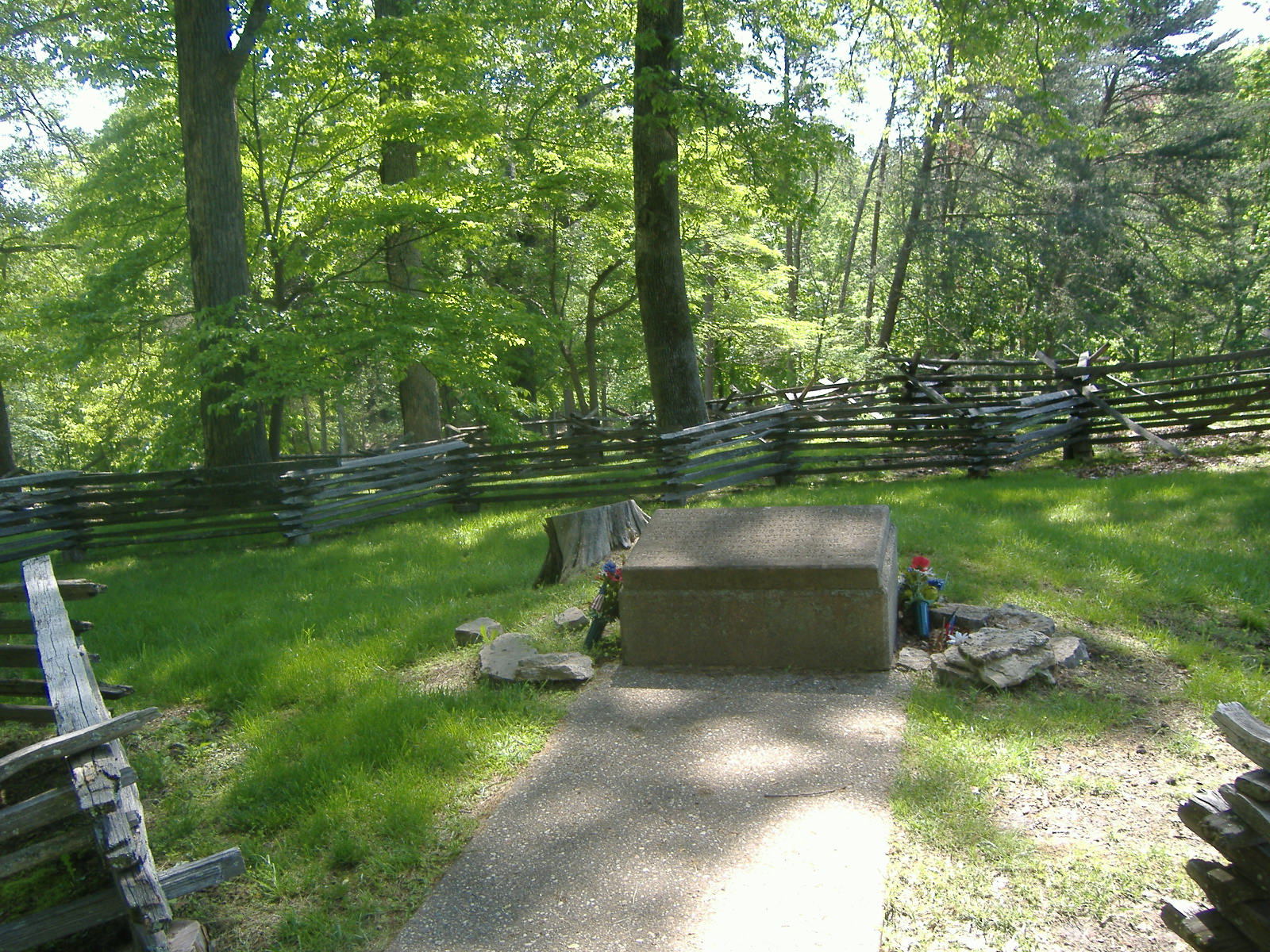

- Location within Kentucky Location within the United States
- Location: Pulaski County, Kentucky
- Nearest city: Nancy, Kentucky
- Built: 1910
- MPS: Civil War Monuments of Kentucky MPS
- NRHP reference No.: 97000671
- Added to NRHP: July 17, 1997

The Confederate Mass Grave Monument in Somerset in Pulaski County, Kentucky, near Nancy, Kentucky, honors the Confederate soldiers who are buried here and who died at the Battle of Mill Springs. These soldiers were from Alabama, Mississippi, and Tennessee, and number over one hundred in total.

The monument was built in 1910 by Bennett H. Young, who during the war rode with Confederate general John Hunt Morgan. Young was drawn to the area due to hearing about the nearby Zollie Tree, which was decorated by a local woman each Memorial Day in honor of general Felix K. Zollicoffer, who died at the Battle of Mill Springs. The monument uses the name "Battle of Fishing Creek", as the battle was known by Southerners in 1910. The rectangular slab of limestone is 4 feet (1.2 m) by 3 feet (0.91 m), and rests on a 1 foot (0.30 m) high slab of concrete.

The Zollie Tree, for which both the Confederate Mass Grave Monument and the nearby General Felix K. Zollicoffer Monument was constructed, was destroyed by lightning in 1995, although a sapling from it was later planted at the same spot. Both are now in what is called Zollicoffer Park, part of the larger Mill Springs Battlefield.

On July 17, 1997, the Confederate Mass Grave Monument in Somerset was one of sixty-one different monuments related to the Civil War in Kentucky placed on the National Register of Historic Places, as part of the Civil War Monuments of Kentucky Multiple Property Submission. The aforementioned General Felix K. Zollicoffer Monument only a few feet away is another of the so-honored monuments. The other monument on the list in Pulaski County is the Battle of Dutton's Hill Monument north of Somerset, Kentucky.

== Gallery ==
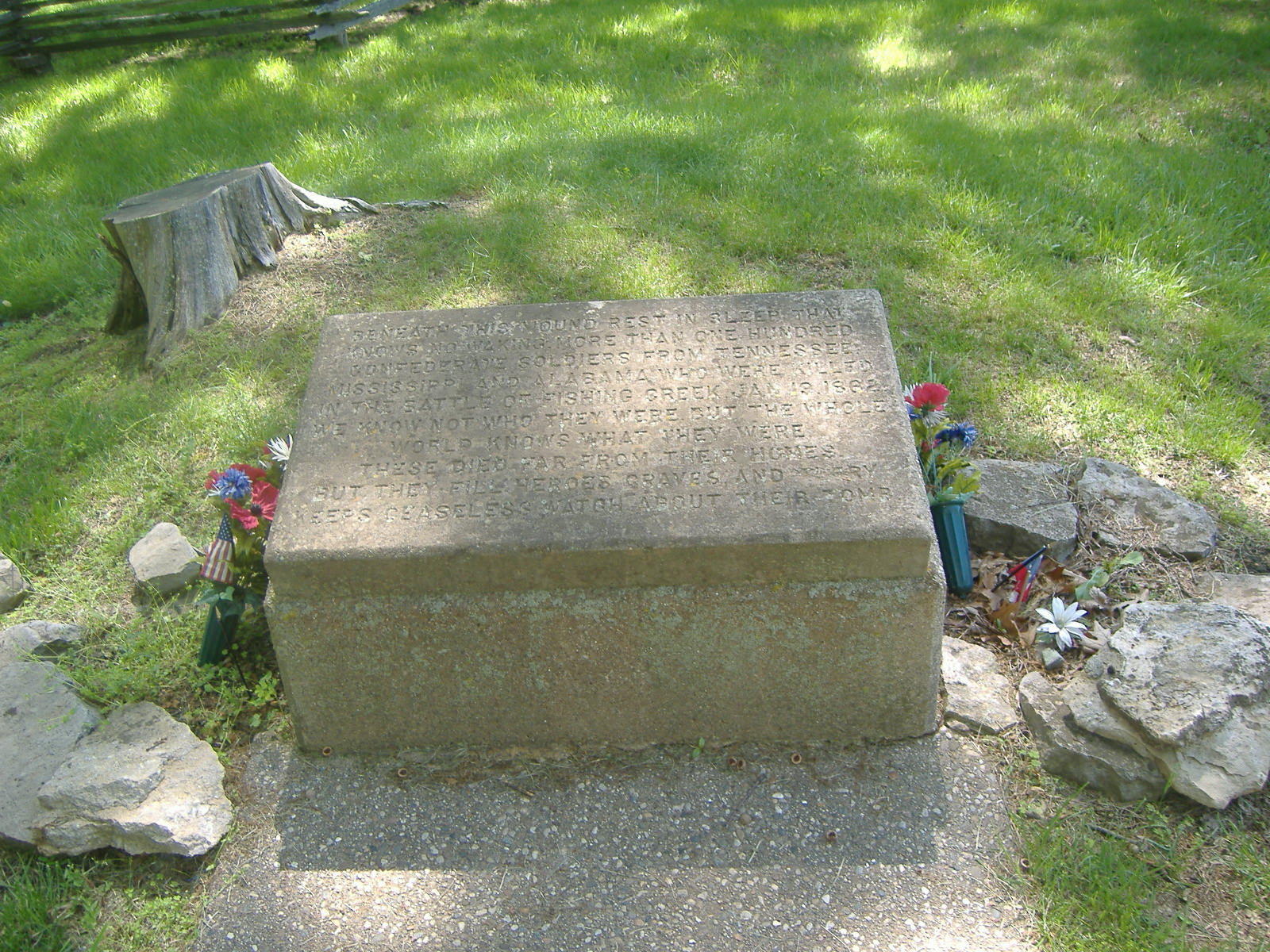
Closeup of the monument

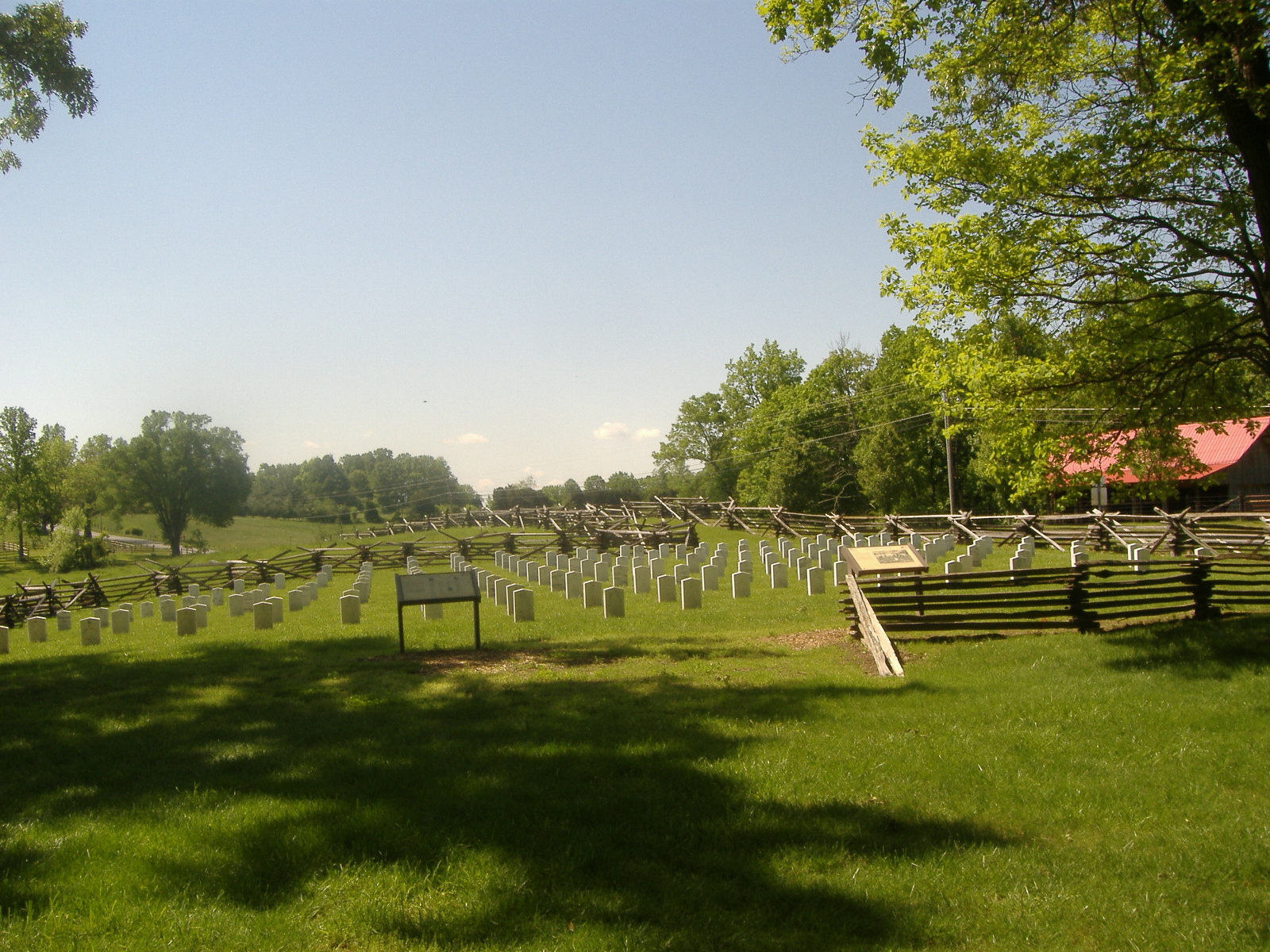
The burial mounds
