= Brent Woods =

Buffalo Soldier in the United States Army (1855–1906)

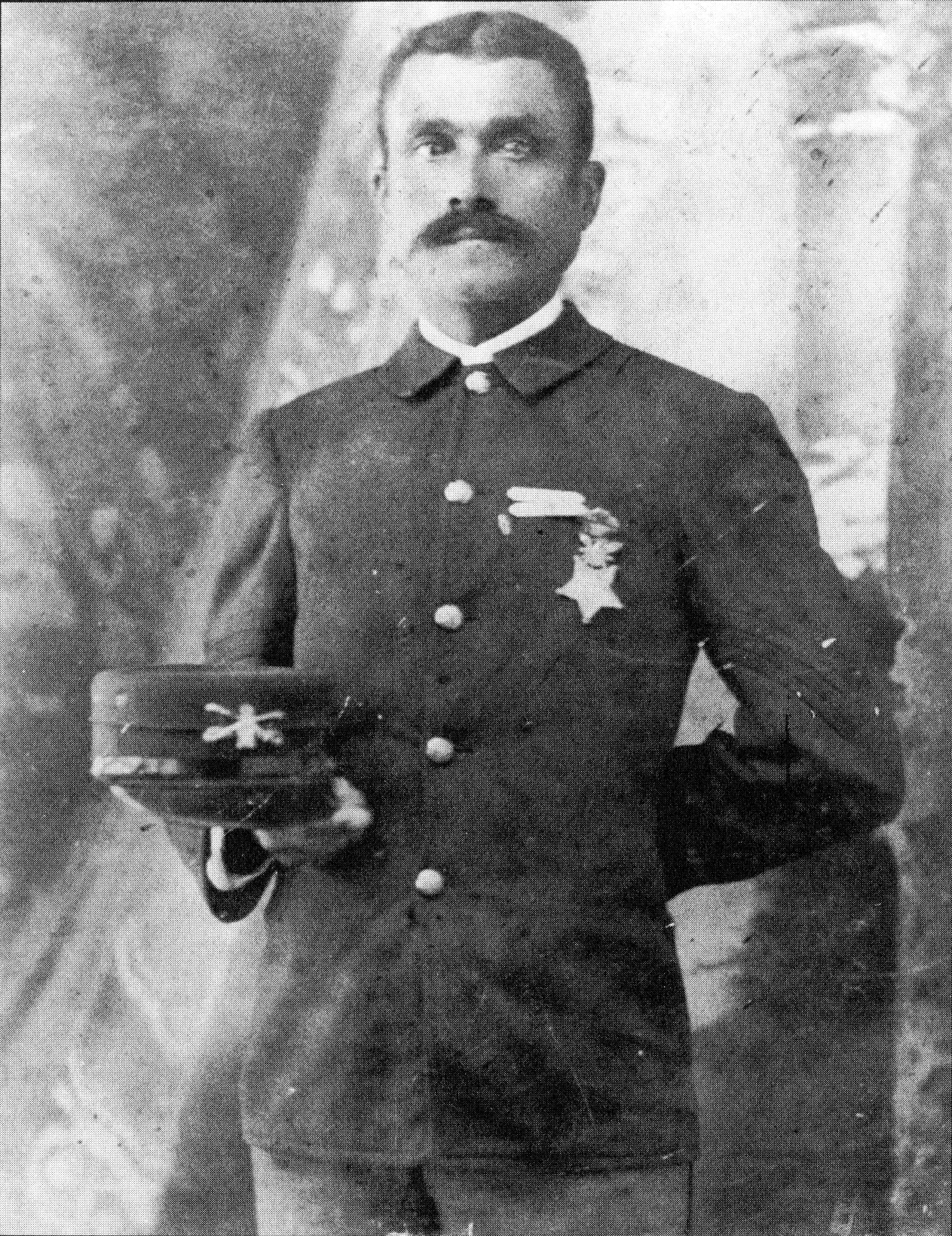
- Sergeant Brent Woods
- Born: 1855; Pulaski County, Kentucky
- Died: March 31, 1906 (aged 50–51); Somerset, Kentucky
- Burial place: Mill Springs National Cemetery, Nancy, Kentucky
- Spouse: Pearl Baker
- Military career
- Allegiance: United States of America
- Branch: United States Army
- Service years: 1873 – 1902
- Rank: Sergeant
- Unit: 9th Cavalry Regiment
- Conflicts: American Indian Wars
- Awards: Medal of Honor

Brent Woods (1855 – March 31, 1906) was an African American Buffalo Soldier in the United States Army and a recipient of America's highest military decoration—the Medal of Honor—for his actions in the Indian Wars of the western United States.

== Biography ==
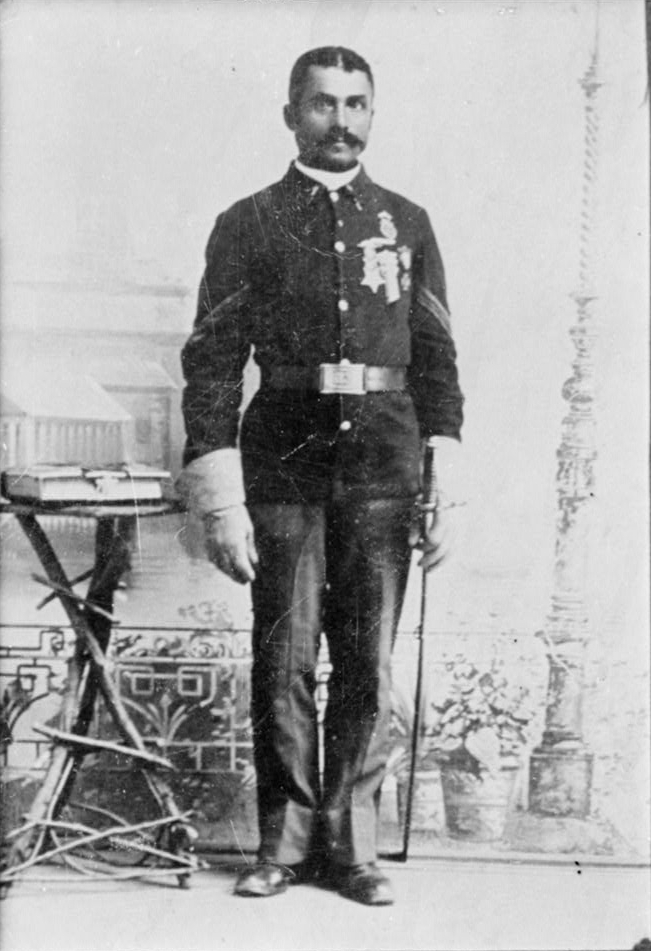
Brent Woods

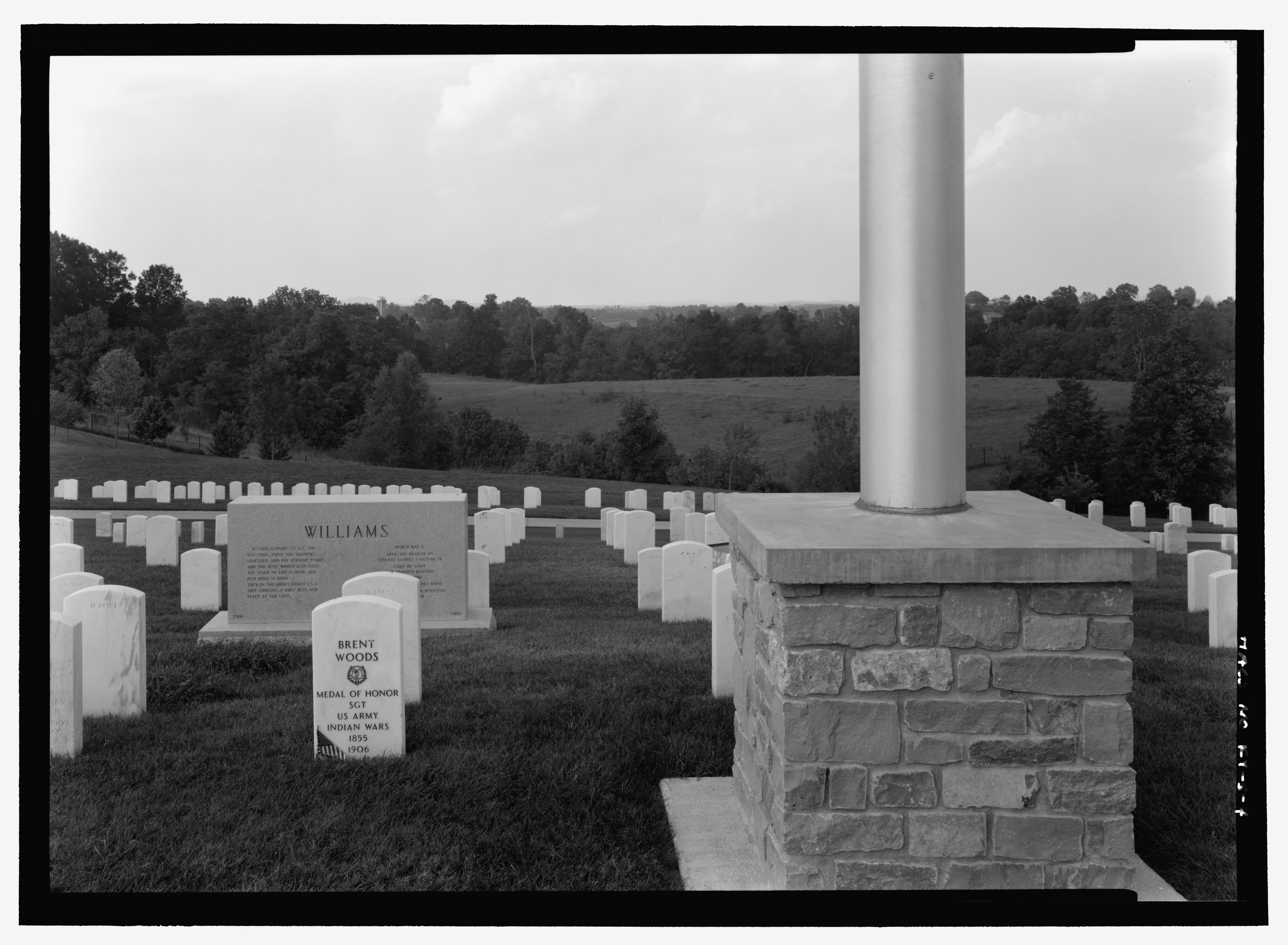
Grave at Mill Springs National Cemetery

Woods was born a slave in Pulaski County, Kentucky and freed at the age of 8. He joined the US Army from Louisville, Kentucky in October 1873 at the age of 18 (although initially claiming to be 23) and was assigned to Company B of the 9th Cavalry Regiment. On August 19, 1881, he participated in a battle at Gavilan Canyon in New Mexico against Chief Nana and a small band of Apaches. After the deaths of six men in his cavalry, including his lieutenant, Woods took command and fought to save the lives of many of his comrades. Thirteen years later, on July 12, 1894, Sergeant Woods was awarded the Medal of Honor for his actions during the engagement. He retired from the army in November 1902 and returned to Somerset. Woods died in 1906 at the age of 50 or 51 and was buried in an unmarked grave at the First Baptist Church of Somerset.

Knowledge of Sergeant Woods' achievements remained largely obscured until 1982 when Lorraine Smith of Somerset started a campaign to mark Woods' grave. On June 20, 1984, the US Army exhumed Woods' remains and gave him a full military funeral on October 28. His grave can be found in section A, grave 930 of Mill Springs National Cemetery, Nancy, Kentucky.

== Medal of Honor citation ==
Rank and organization: Sergeant, Company B, 9th U.S. Cavalry. Place and date: New Mexico, August 19, 1881. Entered service at: Louisville, Ky. Birth: Pulaski County, Ky. Date of issue: July 12, 1894.

Citation

Saved the lives of his comrades and citizens of the detachment.

== See also ==
- List of Medal of Honor recipients
- List of Medal of Honor recipients for the Indian Wars
- List of African American Medal of Honor recipients
