= Battle of Mill Springs order of battle: Confederate =

The following Confederate Army units and commanders fought in the Battle of Mill Springs of the American Civil War on January 19, 1862, near present-day Nancy, Kentucky. The Union order of battle is listed separately.

== Abbreviations used ==
=== Military rank ===
- MG = Major General
- BG = Brigadier General
- Col = Colonel
- Ltc = Lieutenant Colonel
- Cpt = Captain

=== Other ===
- k = killed
- w = wounded

== District of East Tennessee ==
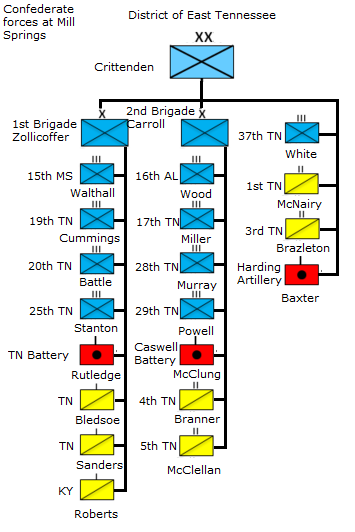
Confederate forces at Mill Springs

MG George Bibb Crittenden

| Brigade | Regiments and Other |
|---|---|
| First Brigade BG Felix Kirk Zollicoffer (k) | 15th Mississippi Infantry: Col Walter Scott Statham (absent), Ltc Edward Cary Walthall (w); 19th Tennessee Infantry: Col David Hamilton Cummings; 20th Tennessee Infantry: Col Joel Allen Battle (w); 25th Tennessee Infantry: Col Sidney Smith Stanton (w); Tennessee Battery: Cpt Arthur Middleton Rutledge; Tennessee Cavalry Company: Cpt William Scott Bledsoe; Tennessee Cavalry Company: Cpt Q. C. "Ned" Sanders (or Saunders); Kentucky Cavalry Company: Cpt B. E. Roberts (attached to Bledsoe & Sanders) |
| Second Brigade BG William Henry Carroll | 16th Alabama Infantry: Col William Basil Wood; 17th Tennessee Infantry: Col Tazewell Willard Newman (absent), Ltc Thomas C. H. Miller; 28th Tennessee Infantry: Col John Porry Murray; 29th Tennessee Infantry: Col Samuel Powel (w), Maj Horace Rice; Tennessee Battery (Caswell Artillery): Cpt Hugh L. W. McClung [not engaged]; 4th Tennessee Cavalry Battalion: Ltc Benjamin Manasseh Branner; 5th Tennessee Cavalry Battalion: Ltc George Rutledge McClellan |

=== Nearby District Troops Not Engaged ===
- 37th Tennessee Infantry: Col Moses White (engaged in the defense of Beech Grove)
- 1st Tennessee Cavalry Battalion: Ltc Frank Nathaniel McNairy (may have been present at Beech Grove)
- 3rd Tennessee Cavalry Battalion (2 companies): Ltc William Brazleton
- Tennessee Battery (Harding Artillery): Cpt George H. Monsarratt, Cpt Edward D. Baxter
