= General Felix K. Zollicoffer Monument =

- U.S. National Register of Historic Places
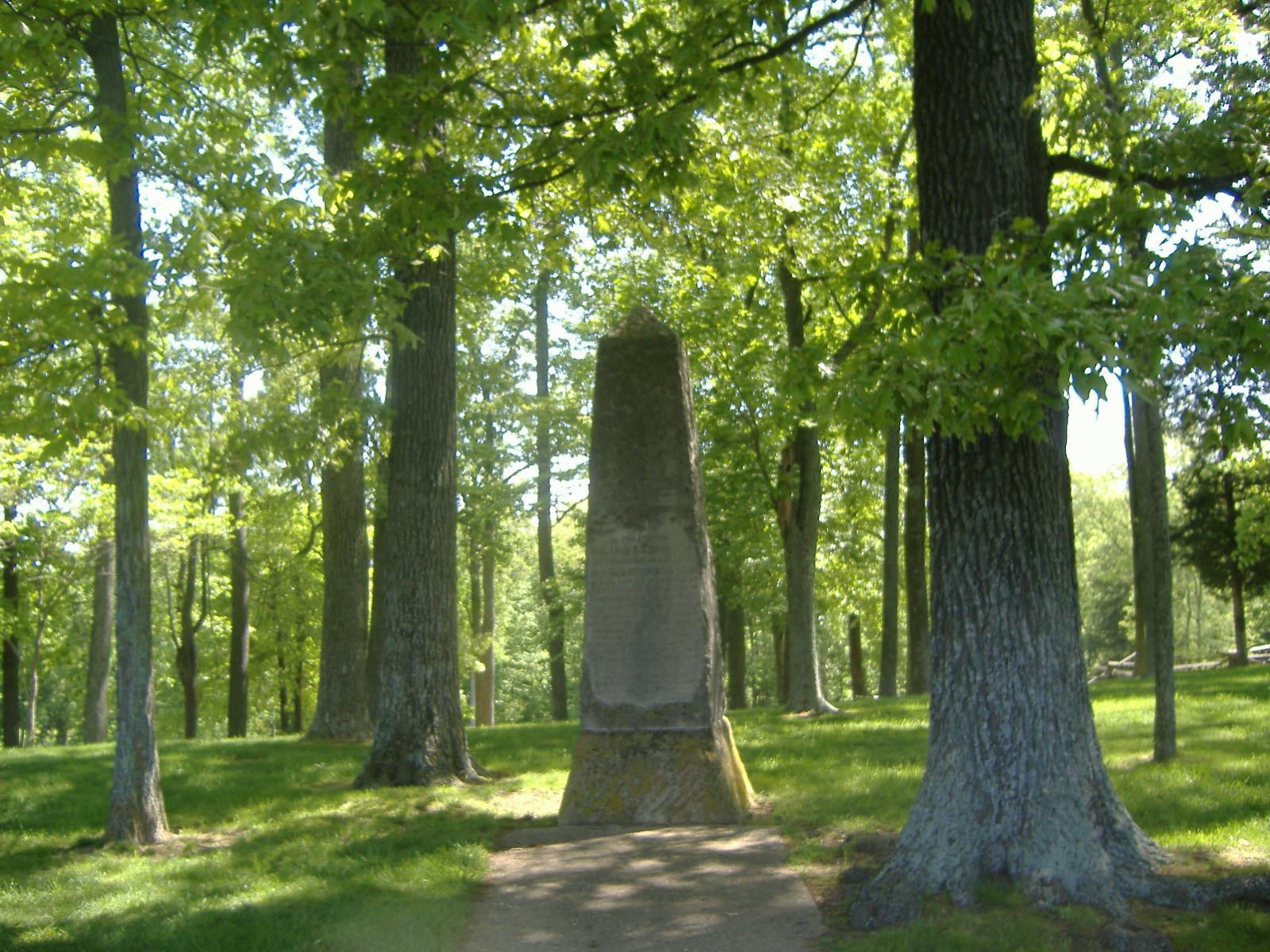

- Location within Kentucky Location within the United States
- Location: Pulaski County, Kentucky
- Nearest city: Nancy, Kentucky
- Built: 1910
- MPS: Civil War Monuments of Kentucky
- NRHP reference No.: 97000672
- Added to NRHP: July 17, 1997

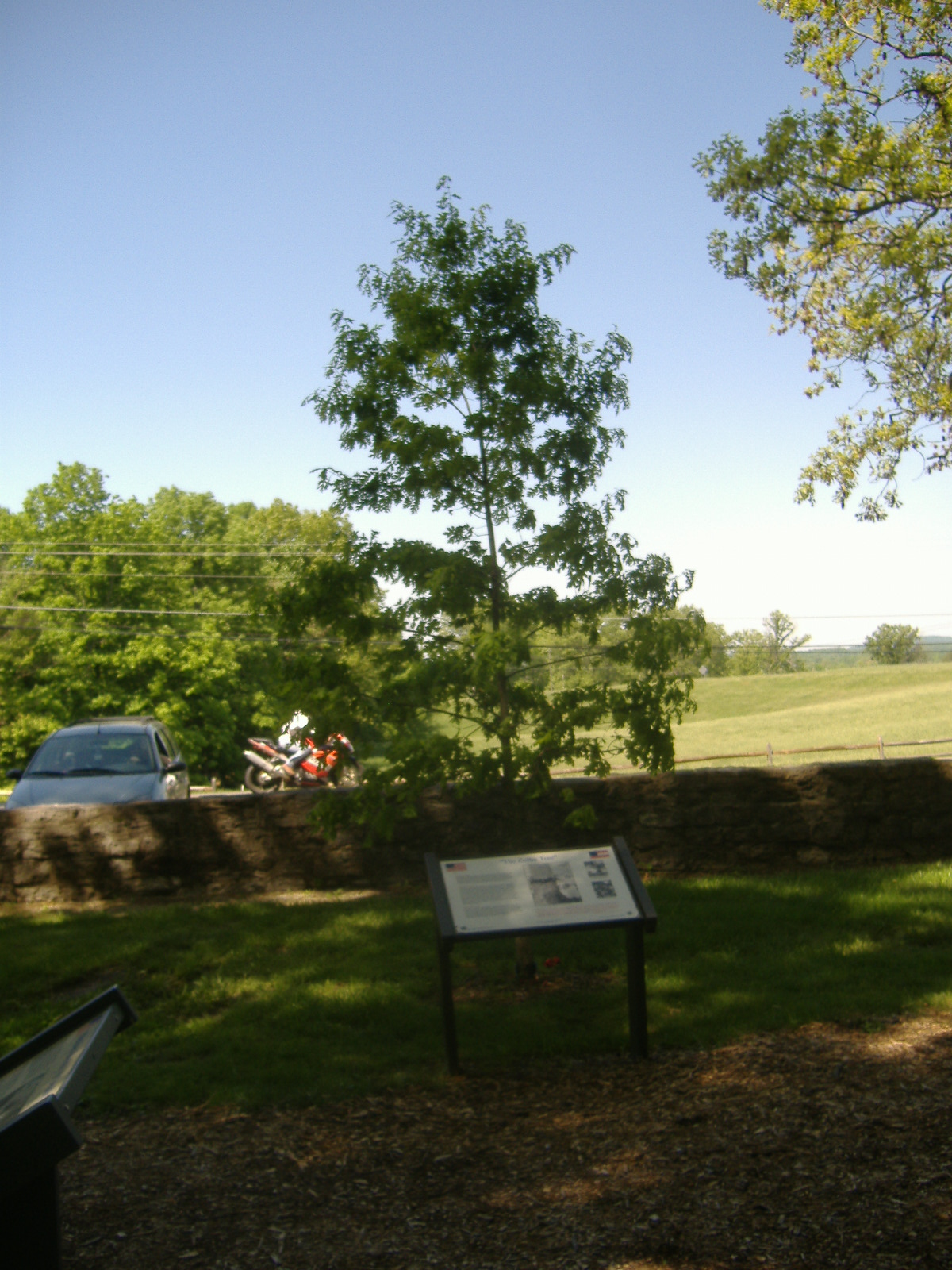
Zollicoffer Tree

The General Felix K. Zollicoffer Monument in Pulaski County, Kentucky, near Nancy, Kentucky, commemorates the death of Confederate General Felix K. Zollicoffer, who died here at the Battle of Mill Springs. A native of nearby Tennessee, he fought for the Confederacy. Zollicoffer was killed due to not realizing he was approaching Union lines instead of the Confederate line.

The monument was placed in 1910 by Bennett H. Young, who rode with Confederate general John Hunt Morgan. Each Memorial Day a young girl from Nancy named Dorotha Burton decorated a white oak tree in Zollicoffer's honor. This was the inspiration for placing the monument only a few feet away from the tree. In the 1990s the tree was destroyed by lightning, but a sapling from that tree was put in its place, and is also called the Zollicoffer tree.

The monument is an 8 feet (2.4 m) tall obelisk made of roughly hewed limestone. The description mentions not only Zollicoffer, but the other Confederates who died during the Battle of Mill Springs.

On July 17, 1997, the General Felix K. Zollicoffer Monument was one of sixty-one different monuments related to the Civil War in Kentucky placed on the National Register of Historic Places, as part of the Civil War Monuments of Kentucky Multiple Property Submission. Only a few feet away is another of the so-honored monuments: the Confederate Mass Grave Monument in Somerset. The other monument on the list in Pulaski County is the Battle of Dutton's Hill Monument north of Somerset, Kentucky.
