= Speed S. Fry =

American general

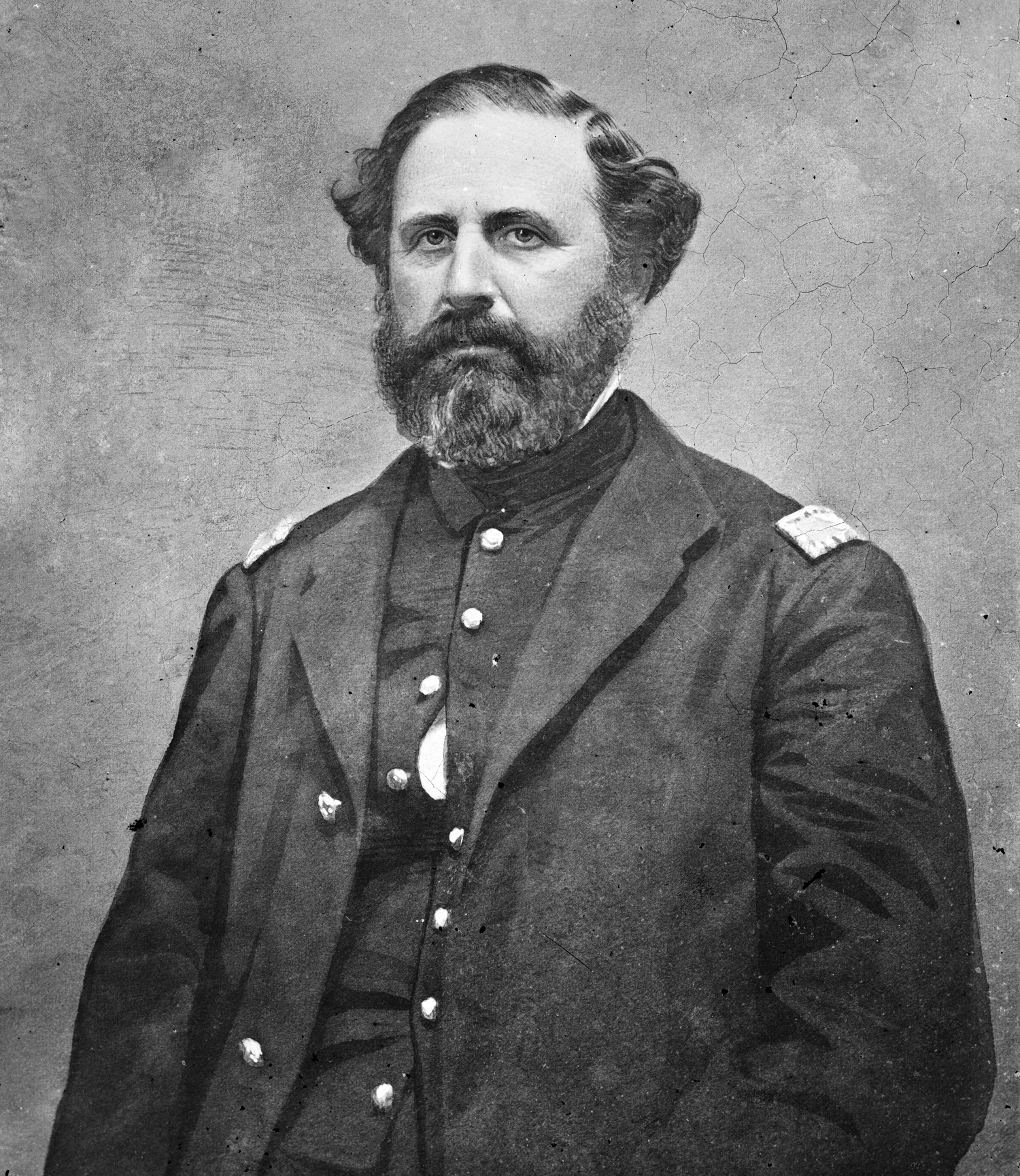
- Col. Speed S. Fry
- Born: Speed Smith Fry; September 9, 1817; Mercer County, Kentucky (now Boyle County)
- Died: August 1, 1892 (aged 74) near Louisville, Kentucky
- Burial place: Bellevue Cemetery, Danville, Kentucky
- Military career
- Allegiance: United States of America; Union
- Branch: United States Army; Union Army
- Rank: Brigadier General
- Commands: 4th Kentucky Volunteer Infantry Regiment
- Conflicts: Mexican–American War; American Civil War

Speed Smith Fry (September 9, 1817 – August 1, 1892) was a lawyer, judge, and a United States Army officer during the Mexican–American War and American Civil War.

== Early life ==
Fry was born in Mercer County, Kentucky (now Boyle County) near Danville. He graduated from Wabash College in Crawfordsville, Indiana, in 1840 and returned to Danville to practice law under his uncle. He served as a captain in the 2nd Kentucky Volunteer Regiment during the Mexican–American War and saw action at the Battle of Buena Vista, where his company fired the last shots of the battle. After the war he returned home and was appointed a judge of Mercer County and served in that position until the Civil War.

== Civil War ==
With the outbreak of the Civil War, Fry was immediately made a colonel of Kentucky Militia. He helped raise the 4th Kentucky Infantry at Camp Dick Robinson and on October 9, 1861, he was appointed colonel of the regiment.

=== Mill Springs and Zollicoffer's death ===
Fry led his regiment into action at the Battle of Mill Springs on January 19, 1862. During the battle the fighting became disorganized and Confederate General Felix Zollicoffer rode up to Fry's regiment thinking they were Confederate troops, and addressing Colonel Fry, he ordered them to stop firing. Zollicoffer's aide came riding from the woods and, attempting to warn the general that he was in the midst of enemy soldiers, fired off a shot. Fry immediately raised his pistol and fired at Zollicoffer, who fell dead. But a debate exists over who actually killed the general. Fry never specifically claimed he was the one who killed Zollicoffer, but many reports and paintings at the time give full credit to him. However, there were members from three different Union regiments standing near Fry who also fired. Whether or not he was the sole person to shoot General Zollicoffer, the Confederates were so outraged that they accused Fry of murder.

=== Promotion to general ===
On March 21, 1862, Fry was appointed brigadier general of volunteers and commanded the 2nd Brigade, 1st Division, in the Army of the Ohio under Don Carlos Buell. His brigade arrived at the Battle of Shiloh at the end of the second day, too late to participate in the fighting. Buell reported that Fry's performance was "inefficient". His brigade did participate in the siege of Corinth. Returning to Kentucky, he led his brigade into action at the Battle of Perryville just a few miles away from where he was born. Once the Confederate forces had withdrawn from Kentucky, Fry took command of the 3rd Division, Center Wing, of the XIV Corps (Army of the Cumberland), which he led in the Stones River Campaign; he and most of his division were not engaged in the Battle of Stones River. For much of the remainder of the war, he commanded the North Central Kentucky sub-district. At the close of the war, he was in command of Camp Nelson, the vast Union recruiting and deployment depot south of Lexington. He was mustered out of the service on August 24, 1865, without being awarded the brevet rank of major general, which was usually bestowed automatically in the case of a brigadier general with Fry's time in grade.

Camp Nelson Expulsion

Fry was directly responsible for the deaths of many Black refugees housed at Camp Nelson, primarily women and children who were the family members of Black recruits, when, on November 23, 1864, he ordered their forced expulsion from the camp during harsh winter conditions. Of the over 400 who were expelled, many froze or starved to death. The order was overturned by his superior Major General Stephen G. Burbridge, giving Captain Theron Hall authority over refugees in the camp on November 29, 1864. Ultimately, only about 250 refugees returned, and of those 100 were confirmed to have died as a result of the ordeal.

== Post Civil War ==
In 1866, Fry was an unsuccessful Republican candidate for Congress. He was the supervisor for Internal Revenue collection in his congressional district. He was the superintendent of the Soldier's Home and was also an elder of the Presbyterian Church.

He died near Louisville, Kentucky, and is buried in the Bellevue Cemetery, Danville, Kentucky.

== See also ==
- List of American Civil War generals (Union)
