= 4th Kentucky Infantry Regiment (Union) =

Military unit in American Civil War

- Active: October 9, 1861 - August 17, 1865
- Country: United States
- Allegiance: Union
- Branch: Infantry (until February 1864); Mounted Infantry
- Engagements: Battle of Mill Springs; Siege of Corinth; Battle of Perryville; Tullahoma Campaign; Battle of Chickamauga; Chattanooga campaign Battle of Missionary Ridge; Second Battle of Franklin; Battle of Nashville; Wilson's Raid

The 4th Kentucky Infantry Regiment was an infantry regiment that served in the Union Army during the American Civil War.

== Service ==
The 4th Kentucky Infantry Regiment was organized at Camp Dick Robinson and mustered in for a three-year enlistment on October 9, 1861, under the command of Colonel Speed Smith Fry. In February 1864, the regiment was reorganized at Lexington, Kentucky, as the 4th Regiment Kentucky Mounted Infantry.

The regiment was attached to Thomas' Command, Army of the Ohio, to November 1861. 2nd Brigade, Army of the Ohio, to December 1861. 2nd Brigade, 1st Division, Army of the Ohio, to September 1862. 2nd Brigade, 1st Division, III Corps, Army of the Ohio, to November 1862. 2nd Brigade, 3rd Division, Center, XIV Corps, Army of the Cumberland, to January 1863. 2nd Brigade, 3rd Division, XIV Corps, to October 1863. 3rd Brigade, 3rd Division, XIV Corps, to June 1864. 1st Brigade, 1st Division, Cavalry Corps, Army of the Cumberland, to November 1864. 1st Brigade, 1st Division, Cavalry Corps, Military Division of Mississippi, to August 1865.

The 4th Kentucky Infantry mustered out of service at Macon, Georgia, on August 17, 1865.

== Detailed service ==
Moved to Crab Orchard, Kentucky, October 28, 1861, then to Lebanon, Kentucky, and duty there until January 1862. Advance on Camp Hamilton January 1–15. Action at Logan's Cross Roads on Fishing Creek January 19. Battle of Mill Springs January 19–20. Duty at Mill Springs until February 11. Moved to Louisville, Kentucky, then to Nashville, Tennessee, February 11-March 2. March to Savannah, Tennessee, March 20-April 7. Expedition to Bear Creek, Alabama, April 12–13. Advance on and siege of Corinth, Mississippi, April 29-May 30. Buell's Campaign in northern Alabama and middle Tennessee June to August. Action at Decatur August 7. March to Nashville, Tennessee, then to Louisville, Kentucky, in pursuit of Bragg August 20-September 26. Pursuit of Bragg into Kentucky October 1–16. Battle of Perryville October 8. March to Gallatin, Tennessee, and duty there until January 13, 1863. Operations against Morgan December 22, 1862 – January 2, 1863. Action at Boston December 29, 1862. Moved to Nashville, Tennessee, January 13, 1863, and duty there until June. Expedition toward Columbia March 4–14. Tullahoma Campaign June 24-July 7. Hoover's Gap June 24–26. Tullahoma June 29–30. Elk River July 3. Occupation of middle Tennessee until August 16. Passage of Cumberland Mountains and Tennessee River and Chickamauga Campaign August 16-September 22. Battle of Chickamauga, September 19–21. Siege of Chattanooga, September 24-November 23. Chattanooga-Ringgold Campaign November 23–27. Orchard Knob November 23–24. Missionary Ridge November 25. Veterans on furlough January and February 1864. Regiment changed to mounted infantry and reorganized at Lexington, Kentucky. Moved to Lafayette, Georgia, May 16-June 11. At Villenow Valley and Snake Creek Gap, Georgia, guarding railroad until July. Action at Lafayette June 24. Near Atlanta June 26. Chattahoochie River July 6–17. McCook's Raid on Atlanta & West Point Railroad and Macon & Western Railroad July 27–31. Lovejoy's Station July 29. Near Newnan July 30. At Kingston, Georgia, until September 17. Moved to Nashville, Tennessee, then to Franklin and pursuit of Forrest September 25-October 10. Pulaski, Tennessee, September 26, 27 and 29. Muscle Shoals, near Florence, Alabama, October 30. Near Shoal Creek, Alabama, October 31. Nashville Campaign November–December. Shoal Creek, near Florence, November 5–6. On line of Shoal Creek November 16–20. Fouche Springs November 23. Campbellsville November 24. In front of Columbia November 24–27. Battle of Franklin November 30. Battle of Nashville December 15–16. Lynnville and Richland Creek December 24–25. Pulaski December 25–26. Expedition into Mississippi January 15–21, 1865. Wilson's Raid to Macon, Georgia, March 22-May 1. Trion, Alabama, April 1. Northport, near Tuscaloosa, April 3. Occupation of Tuscaloosa April 4. Occupation of Talladega April 22. Munford's Station April 23. Rejoin Wilson at Macon May 1. Duty at Macon and in Georgia until August.

== Casualties ==
The regiment lost a total of 459 men during service; 1 officer and 118 enlisted men killed or mortally wounded, 4 officers and 326 enlisted men died of disease.

== Commanders ==
- Colonel Speed S. Fry
- Colonel John Thomas Croxton
- Lieutenant Colonel P. Burgess Hunt
- Major Robert M. Kelly

== See also ==
- List of Kentucky Civil War Units
- Kentucky in the Civil War
