= Mill Springs National Cemetery =

Historic veterans cemetery in Pulaski County, Kentucky

- U.S. National Register of Historic Places
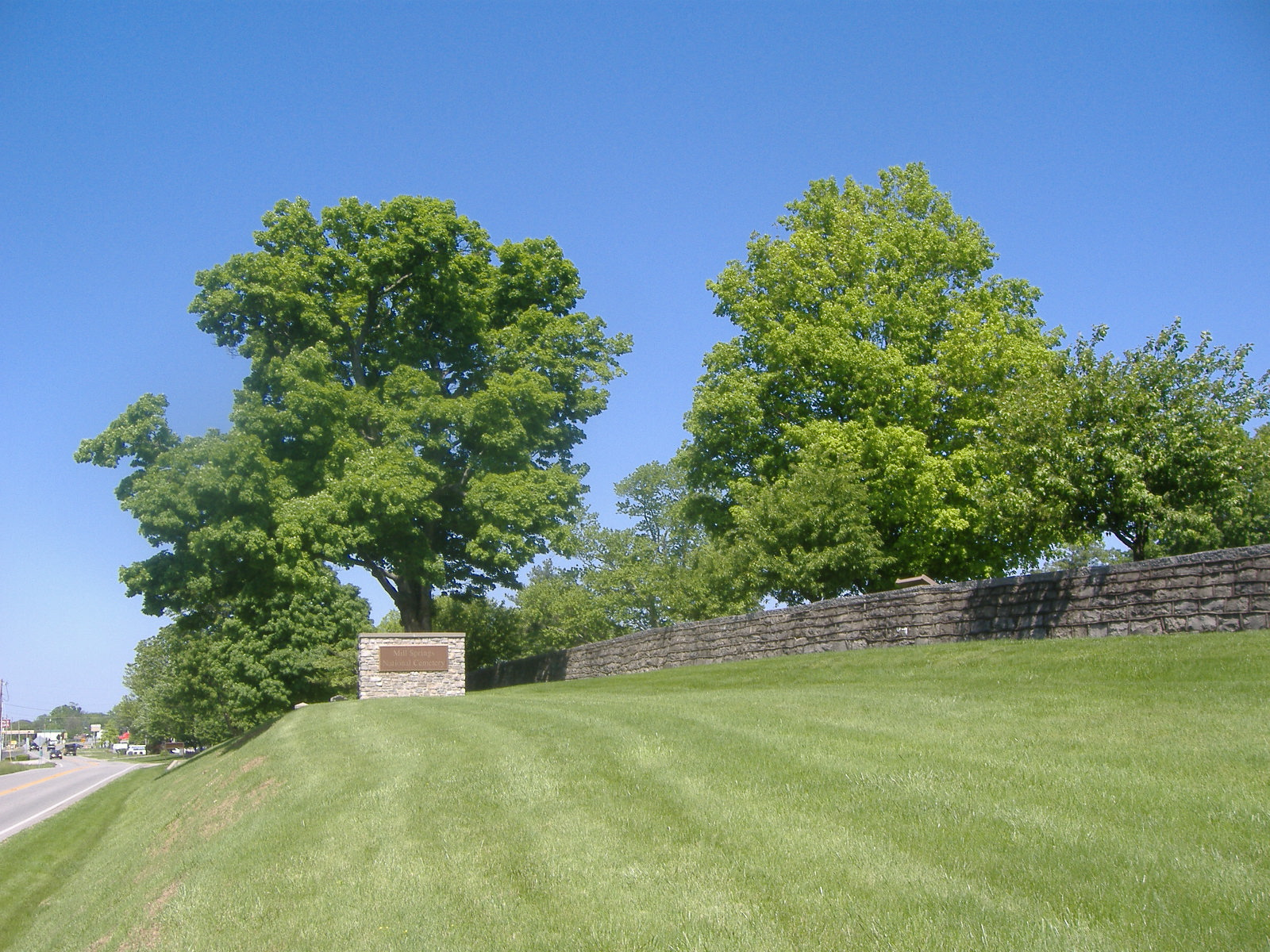
- Mill Springs National Cemetery entrance

- Location within Kentucky Location within the United States
- Location: 9044 West Hwy 80, Nancy, Kentucky
- Coordinates: 37°04′06″N 84°44′14″W
- Area: 3.5 acres (1.4 ha)
- Built: 1862
- MPS: Civil War Era National Cemeteries MPS
- NRHP reference No.: 98000592
- Added to NRHP: May 29, 1998

Mill Springs National Cemetery is a United States National Cemetery located in the unincorporated community of Nancy, eight miles (13 km) west of the city of Somerset in Pulaski County, Kentucky. Administered by the United States Department of Veterans Affairs, it encompasses 6.3 acres (2.5 ha), and as of 2014, has over 4,000 interments.

Mill Springs National Cemetery was listed in the National Register of Historic Places in 1998.

== History ==
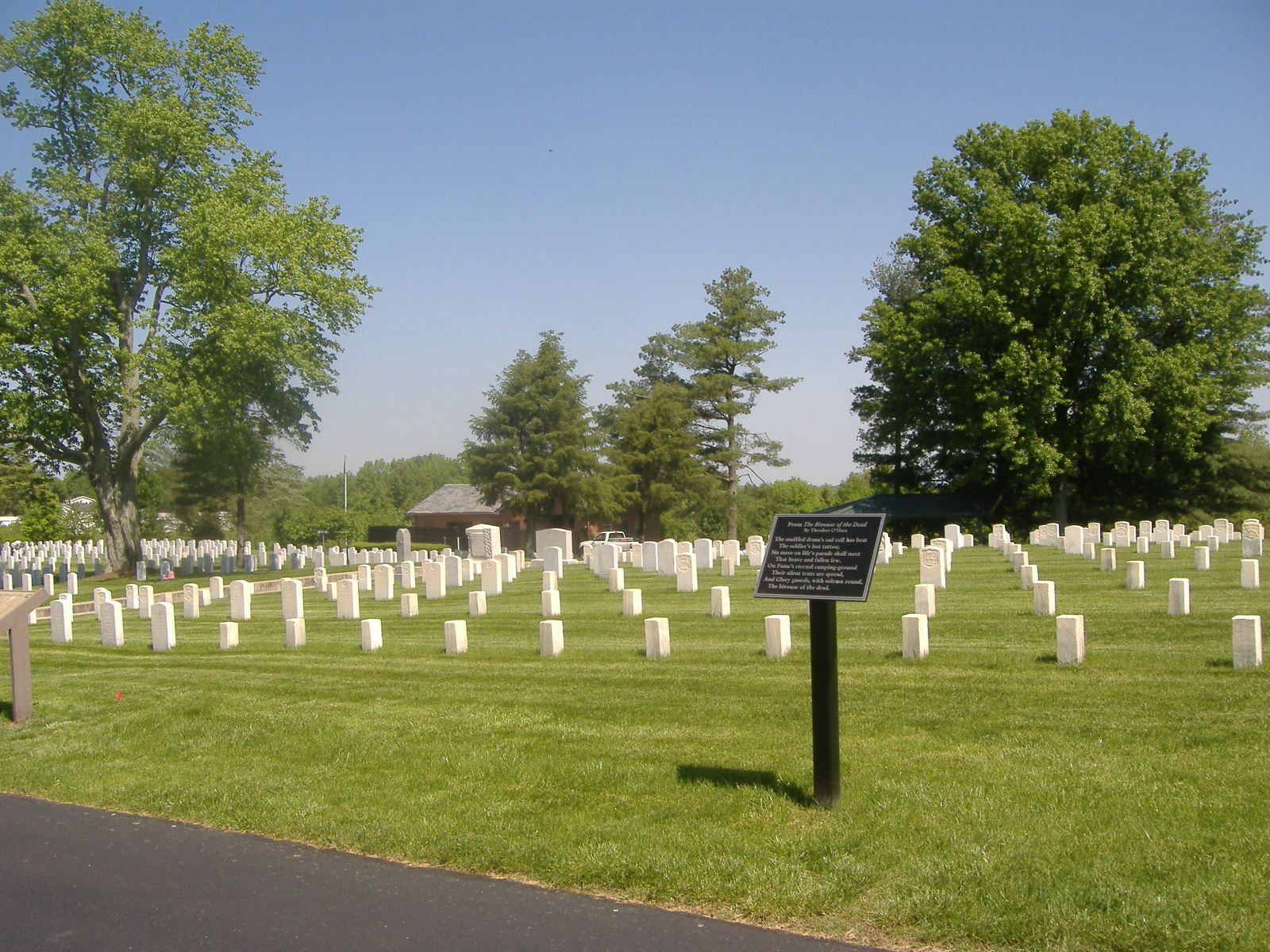
Plaque with Bivouac of the Dead

The site of Mill Springs National Cemetery was originally the battlefield cemetery of the Battle of Mill Springs, Sunday 19 January 1862, initially designated Logan's Cross Roads Cemetery. Soldiers who fell in the battle were buried in large trenches. After the Civil War, it became an official National Cemetery and had its name changed. Many battlefield cemeteries in the region had their remains transferred to Mill Springs.

In 1867, additional land was donated to the federal government for the cemetery by William H. Logan; he and his wife were buried in the cemetery upon their deaths.

Mill Springs National Cemetery was on the list of the first National Cemeteries created. As small as it is, the cemetery still receives burials. It is one of the oldest National Cemeteries still in operation.

== Notable interments ==
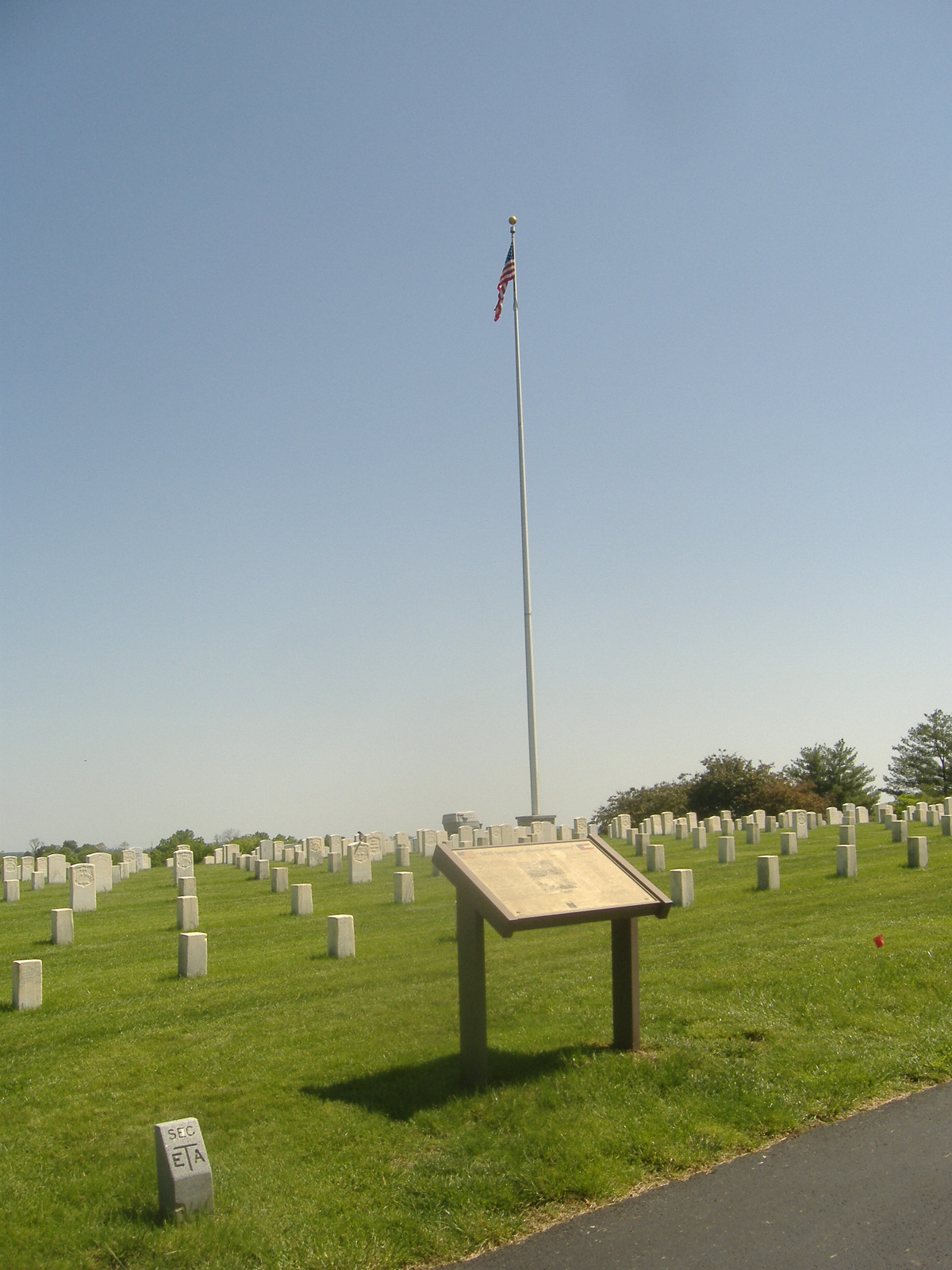
Graves

- Sergeant Brent Woods (1850–1906), Medal of Honor recipient for action in New Mexico Territory during the Indian Wars.
