= Nancy, Kentucky =

- Unincorporated community
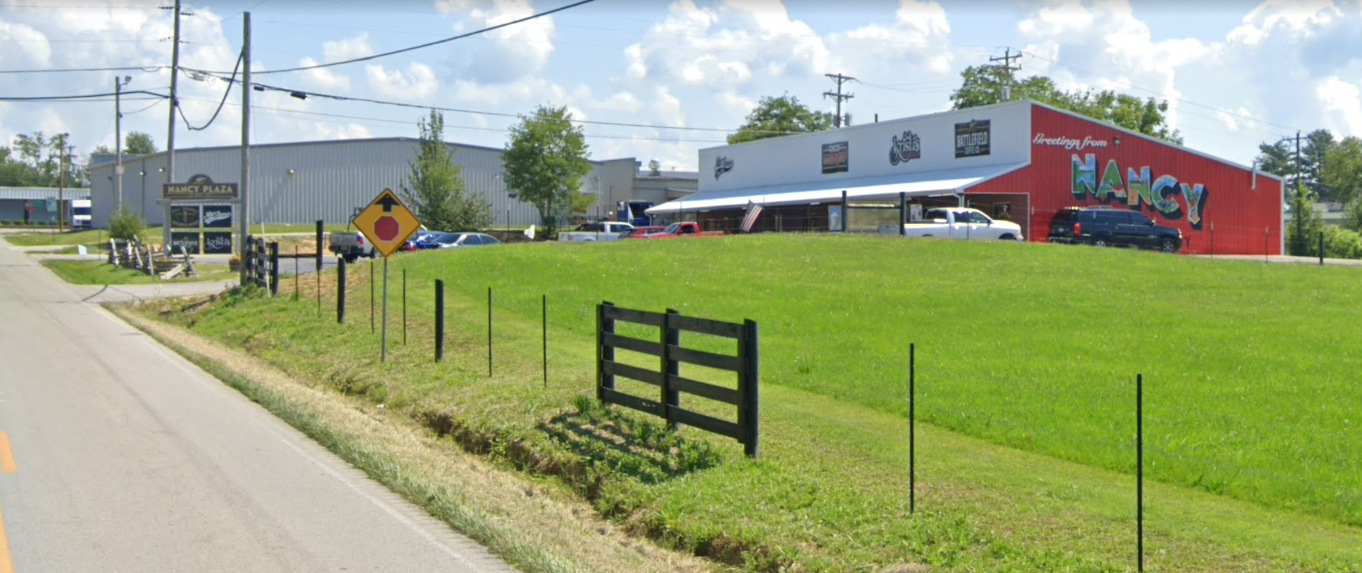
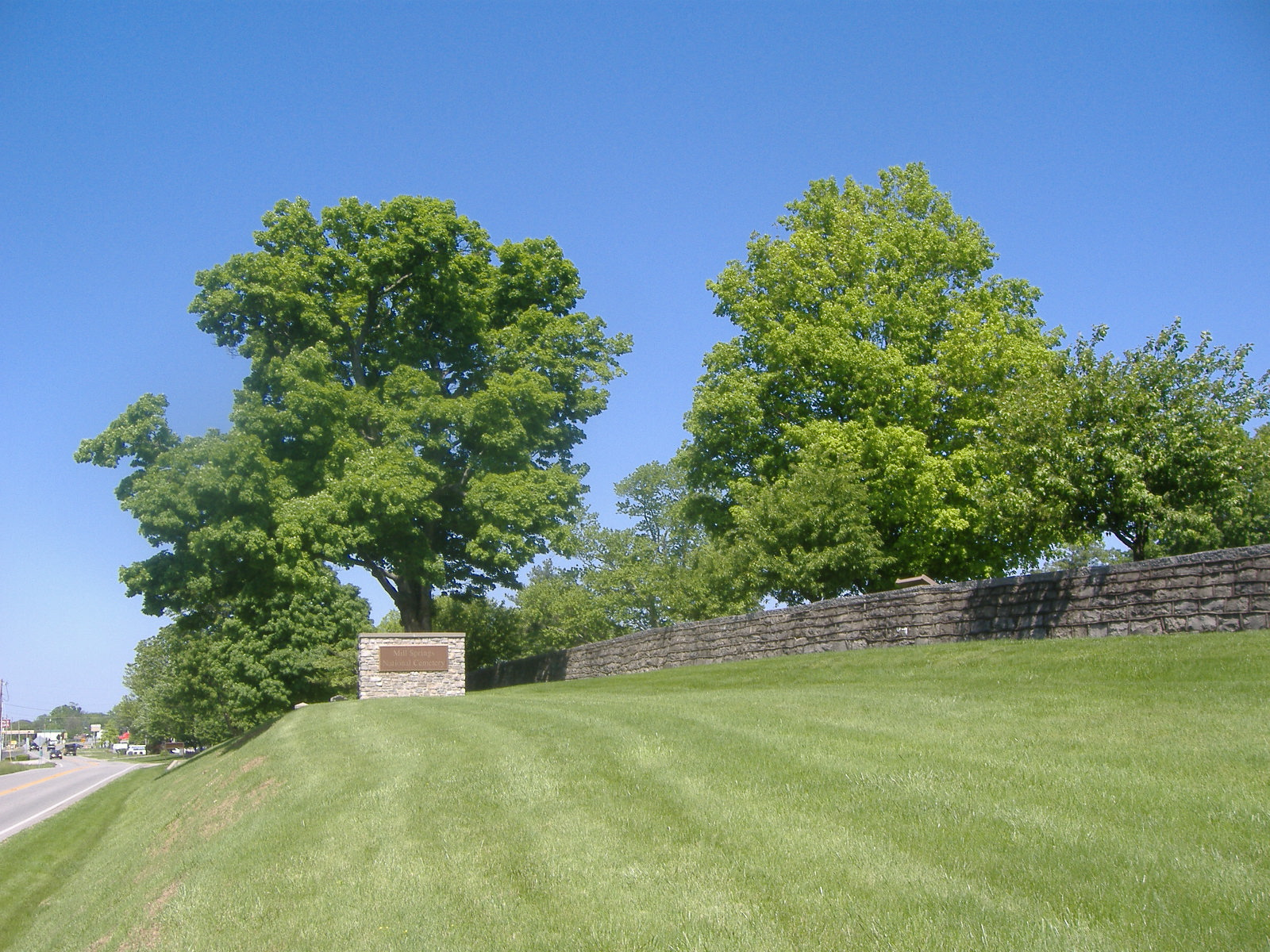
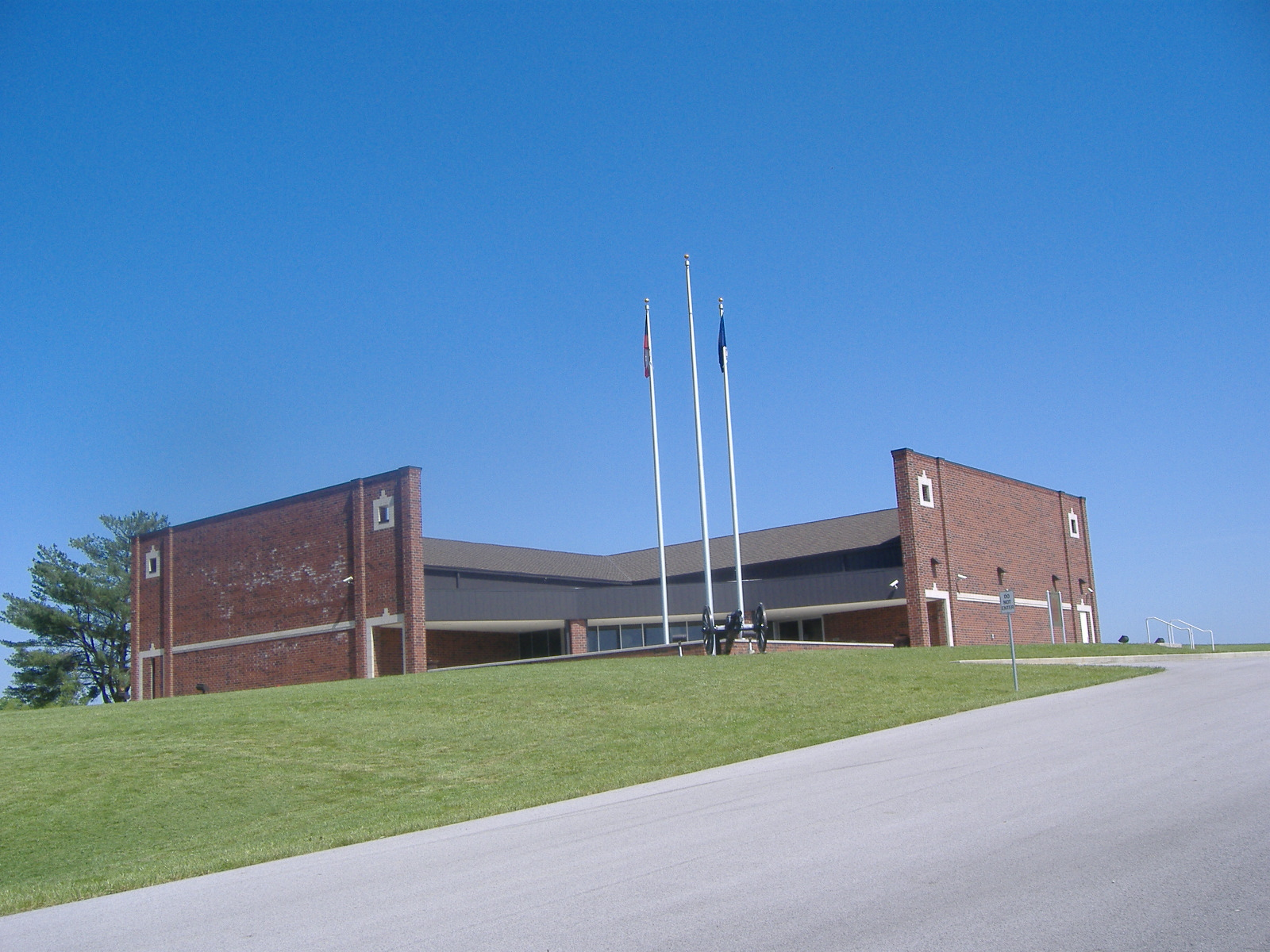
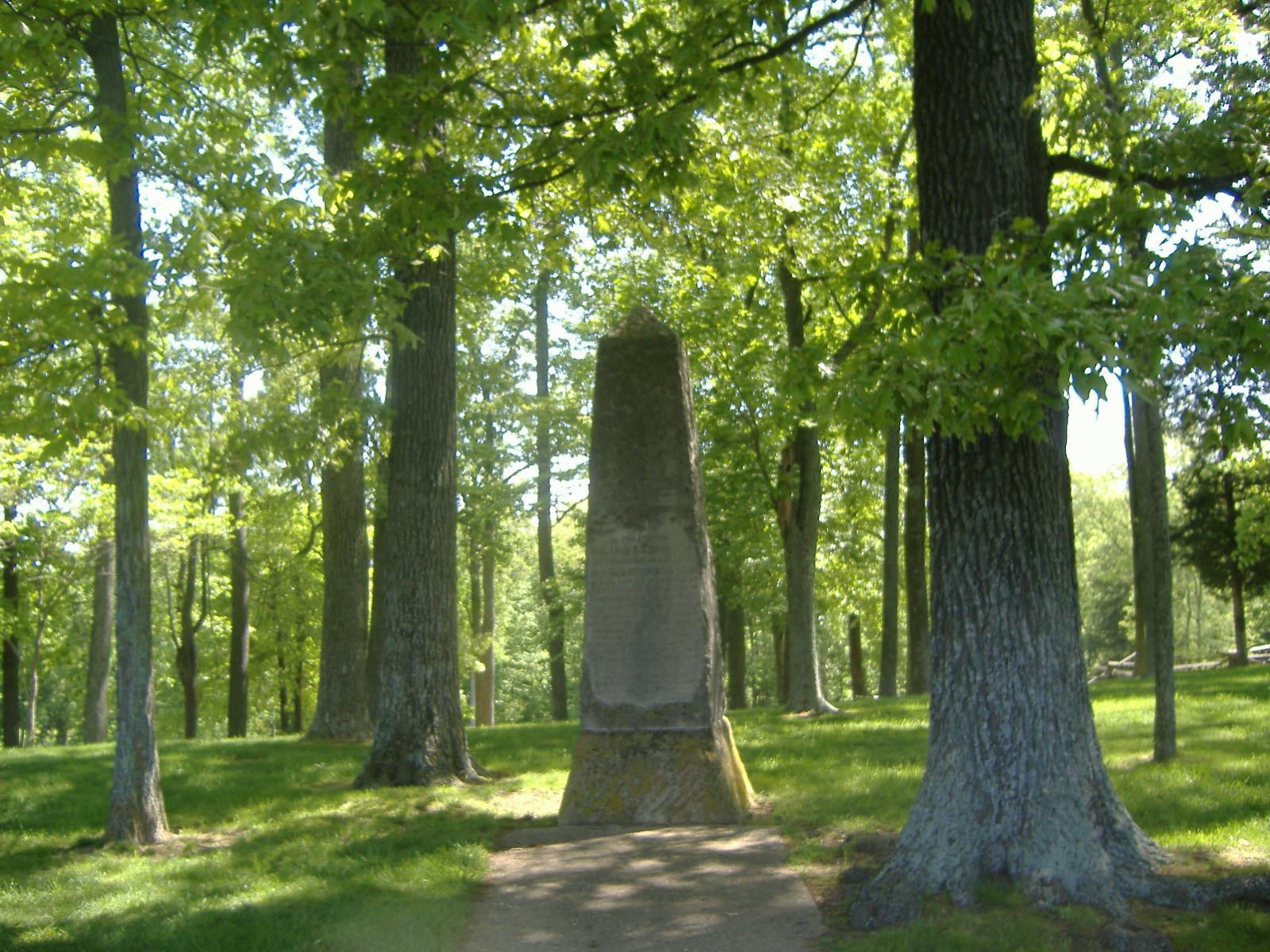
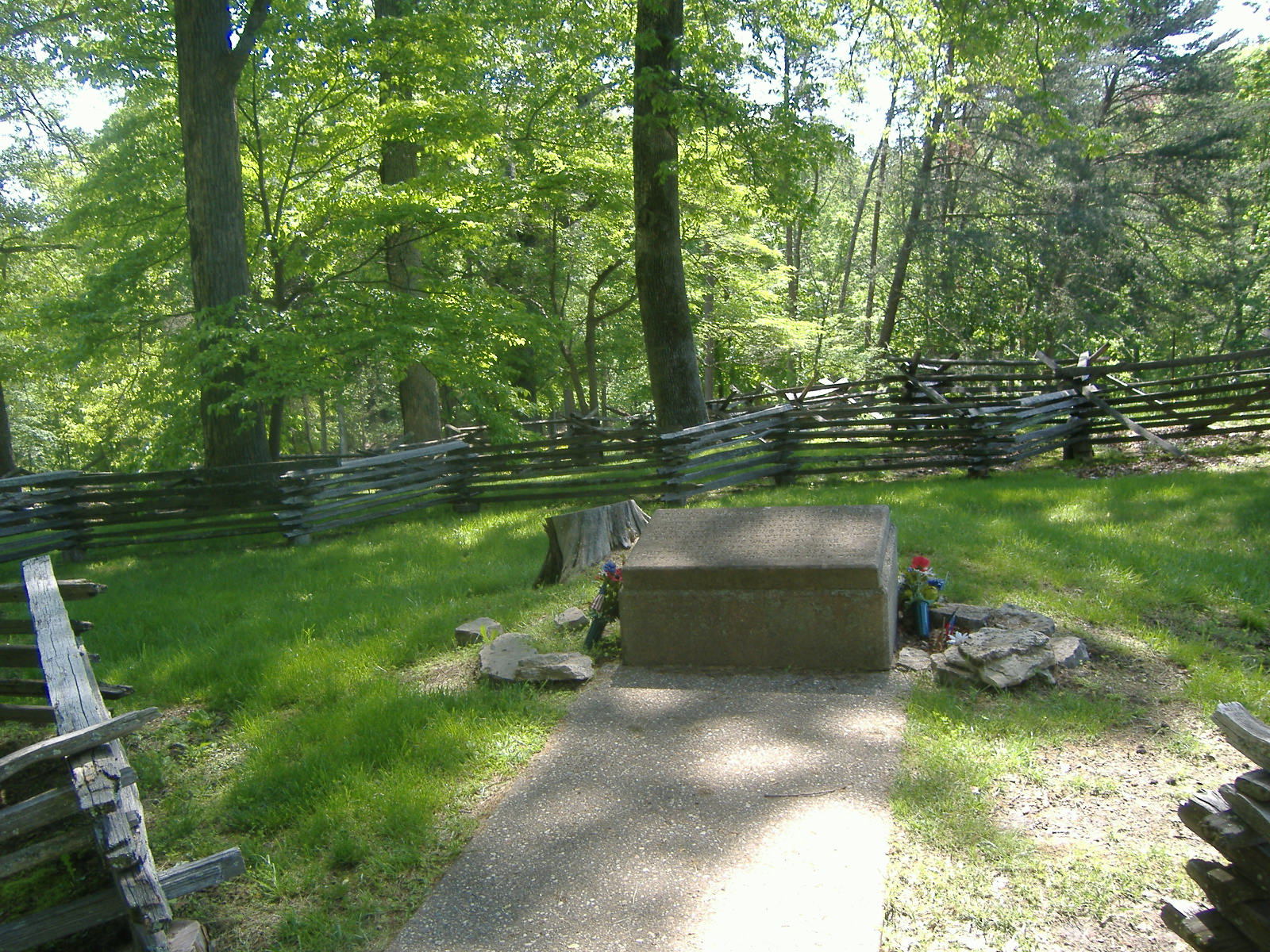
- 'Greeting's from Nancy' artwork at the Mill Springs Plaza Mill Springs National Cemetery entrance Mill Springs Battlefield Visitor Center General Felix K. Zollicoffer Monument Confederate Mass Grave Monument
- Interactive map of Nancy, Kentucky
- Coordinates: 37°4′18″N 84°44′52″W
- State: Kentucky
- County: Pulaski
- Country: United States
- Elevation: 330 m (1,080 ft)

Population
  - Total: 5,053
- Time zone: UTC-5
- Area code: 606

Nancy is an unincorporated community eight miles west of the city of Somerset in Pulaski County, Kentucky. The ZIP Code for Nancy is 42544. According to the 2020 census the total population is 5,053.

== History ==
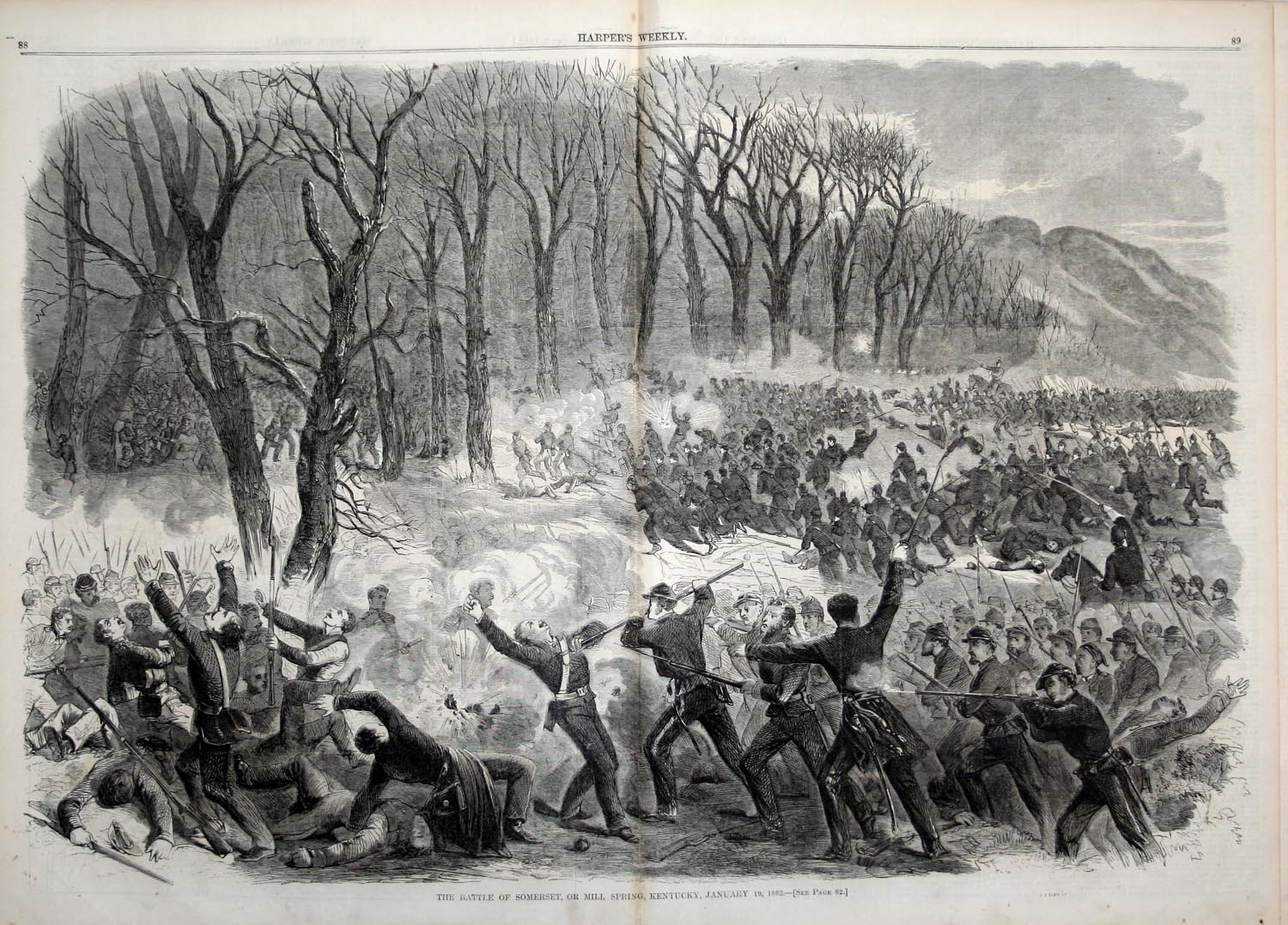
Illustration of the Battle of Mill Springs

On January 19, 1862, during the American Civil War, Union forces achieved their first significant victory, defeating the Confederates at the Battle of Mill Springs near Nancy. The Mill Springs National Cemetery today is administered by the United States Department of Veterans Affairs.

=== 2025 tornado ===
On the night of May 16, 2025, a long-track tornado passed through the Nancy and Faubush areas before intensifying into an EF4 storm further east near Somerset and London. Local emergency dispatchers received the first 911 call of the outbreak from Nancy at around 10:46 pm, after a falling tree trapped residents inside a home. Tracking just south of the community across KY 761 and KY 235 at EF1 to EF2 strength, the storm destroyed barns and outbuildings, tore roofs off homes, and snapped numerous trees.

== Education ==
Nancy Elementary School, also sometimes initialized as NES, is a public elementary school in the community. It is under the administration of Pulaski County Schools. The school provides education to grades 1–5. After attending NES, students attend Southern Middle School, then attend Southwestern High School.

Nancy has a lending library, a branch of the Pulaski County Public Library.

== Notable people ==
- Shane Baker - politician
