= Battle of Mill Springs =

Part of the American Civil War

Coordinates: 37.0562°N 84.7383°W

- Part of the American Civil War
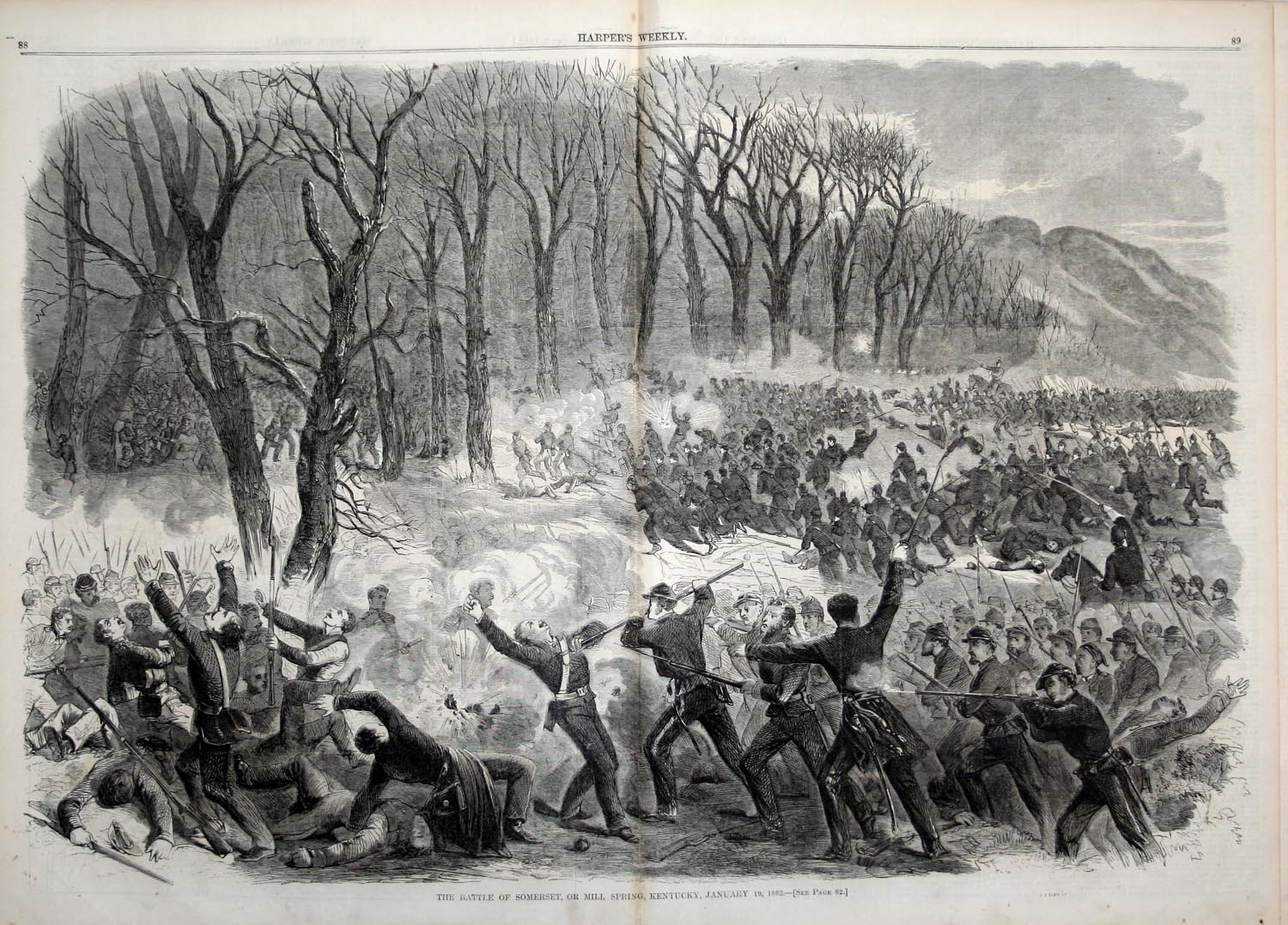
- Battle of Somerset, or Mill Spring; Harper's Weekly, February 8 1862
Date	January 19, 1862
Location	Pulaski County and Wayne County, Kentucky
Result	Union victory

Belligerents
United States (Union)	(Confederate States of America) CSA (Confederacy)

Commanders and leaders
George H. Thomas	George B. Crittenden; Felix Kirk Zollicoffer †

Units involved
Kentucky, Indiana, Ohio, Minnesota and Tennessee infantry, cavalry and artillery regiments	Mississippi, Tennessee, Kentucky and Alabama infantry, cavalry and artillery regiments

Strength
4,400	5,900

Casualties and losses
39 killed 207 wounded	125 killed 404 wounded/missing

The Battle of Mill Springs, also known as the Battle of Fishing Creek in the Confederacy, and the Battle of Logan's Cross Roads or Battle of Somerset in the Union, was fought in Wayne and Pulaski counties, near the current unincorporated community of Nancy, Kentucky, on January 19, 1862, as part of the American Civil War. The Union victory concluded an early Confederate offensive campaign in south central Kentucky.

In late 1861, Confederate Brig. Gen. Felix Zollicoffer guarded Cumberland Gap, the eastern end of a defensive line extending from Columbus, Kentucky. In November he advanced west into Kentucky to strengthen control in the area around Somerset and made Mill Springs his winter quarters, taking advantage of a strong defensive position. Union Brig. Gen. George H. Thomas, ordered to break up the army of Maj. Gen. George B. Crittenden (Zollicoffer's superior), sought to drive the Confederates across the Cumberland River. His force arrived at Logan's Crossroads on January 17, 1862, where he waited for Brig. Gen. Albin Schoepf's troops from Somerset to join him. The Confederate force under Crittenden attacked Thomas at Logan's Crossroads at dawn on January 19. Unbeknownst to the Confederates, some of Schoepf's troops had arrived as reinforcements. The Confederates achieved early success, but Union resistance rallied and Zollicoffer was killed. A second Confederate attack was repulsed. Union counterattacks on the Confederate right and left were successful, forcing them from the field in a retreat that ended in Murfreesboro, Tennessee.

Mill Springs was the first significant Union victory of the war, much celebrated in the popular press, but was soon eclipsed by Ulysses S. Grant's victories at Forts Henry and Donelson.

== Background ==
In 1861 the critical border state of Kentucky had declared neutrality in the fight to maintain the Union. This neutrality was first violated on September 3, when Confederate Brig. Gen. Gideon J. Pillow, acting on orders from Maj. Gen. Leonidas Polk, occupied Columbus, and two days later, Union Brig. Gen. Ulysses S. Grant seized Paducah. Henceforth, neither adversary respected the proclaimed neutrality of the state and the Confederate advantage was lost; the buffer zone that Kentucky provided was no longer available to assist in the defense of Tennessee.

By early 1862, a single Confederate general, Albert Sidney Johnston, commanded all forces from Arkansas to the Cumberland Gap. His forces were spread thinly over a wide defensive line. His left flank was Polk in Columbus with 12,000 men. The center consisted of two forts under the command of Brig. Gen. Lloyd Tilghman, with 4,000. Forts Henry and Donelson were the sole positions to defend the important Tennessee and Cumberland rivers, respectively. His right flank was in Kentucky, with Brig. Gen. Simon Bolivar Buckner's 4,000 men in Bowling Green, and about 4,000 in the Military District of East Tennessee under Maj. Gen. George B. Crittenden, which had the responsibility for guarding the Cumberland Gap, the gateway for entering pro-Unionist East Tennessee.

Crittenden's 1st Brigade was commanded by Brig. Gen. Felix Zollicoffer, whose main responsibility was to guard the Cumberland Gap. Assuming that the gap was fortified satisfactorily, in November 1861 he advanced west into Kentucky to move closer to the Confederate forces in Bowling Green and to strengthen control in the area around Somerset. The southern bank of the Cumberland River at Mill Springs was a bluff and a strong defensive position, whereas the northern bank was low and flat. Zollicoffer chose to move most of his men to the north bank where they would be closer to nearby Union troops, incorrectly assuming that it was more defensible. Both Crittenden and Albert Sidney Johnston ordered Zollicoffer to relocate south of the river, but he could not comply because he had insufficient boats to cross the unfordable river quickly and was afraid his brigade would be caught by the enemy halfway across.

Union Brig. Gen. George H. Thomas received orders to drive the Confederates across the Cumberland River and break up Crittenden's army. Thomas left Lebanon and slowly marched through rain-soaked country, arriving at Logan's Crossroads on January 17, where he waited for Brig. Gen. Albin F. Schoepf's troops from Somerset to join him. Crittenden, who until early January had remained in his headquarters in Knoxville, arrived at Mill Springs and realized that his inexperienced subordinate was in a dangerous situation. He devised a plan to attack the Union force before it could concentrate against him. One section of the Union Army, three brigades under Thomas, was located at Logan's Crossroads, while Schoepf's brigade was at Somerset, separated by rain-swollen Fishing Creek, which might be a sufficient barrier to prevent the forces from joining quickly. Crittenden ordered Zollicoffer to attack the Union camp at Logan's Crossroads at dawn on January 19.

== Battle ==
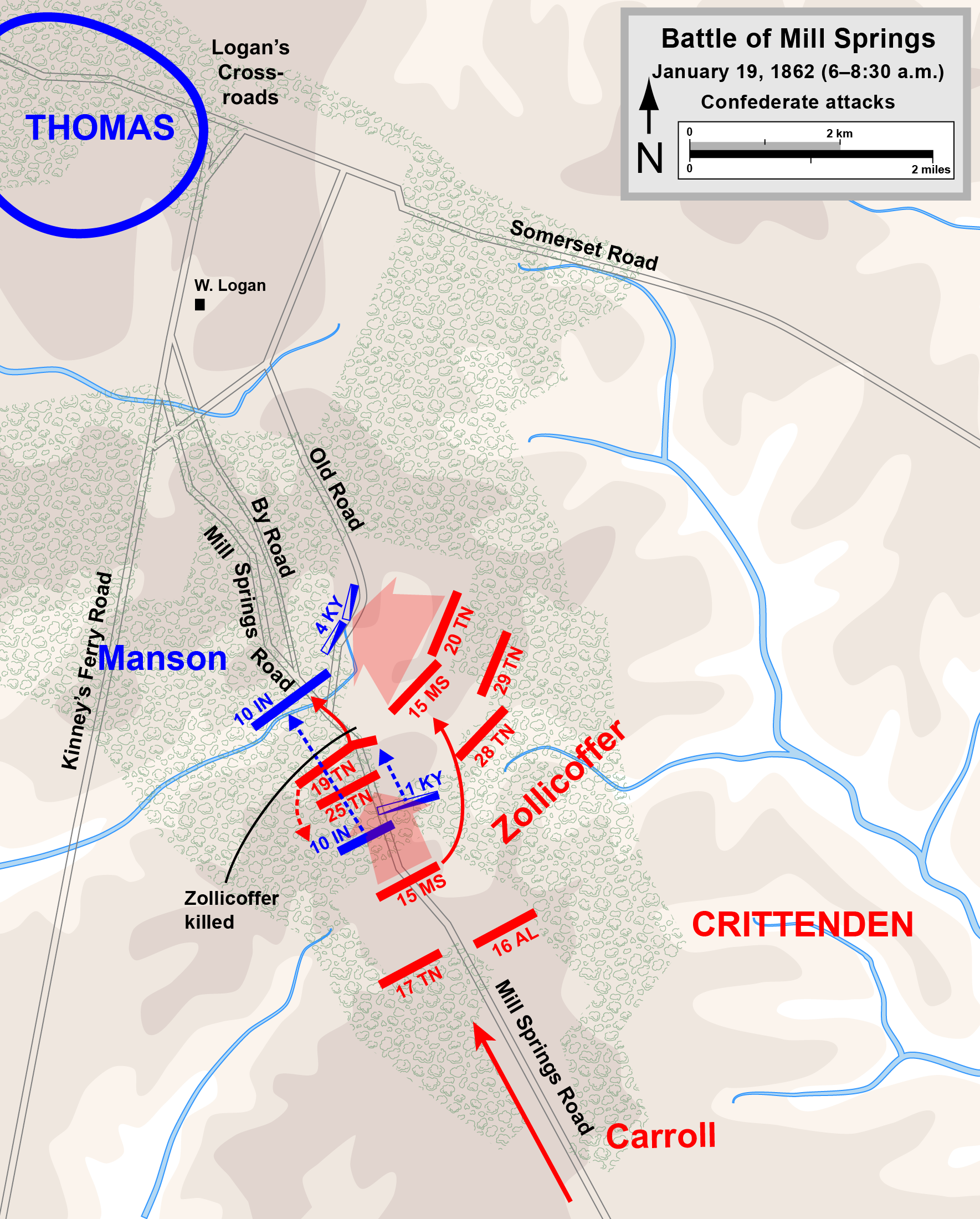
Battle of Mill Springs, Confederate attacks Confederate Union

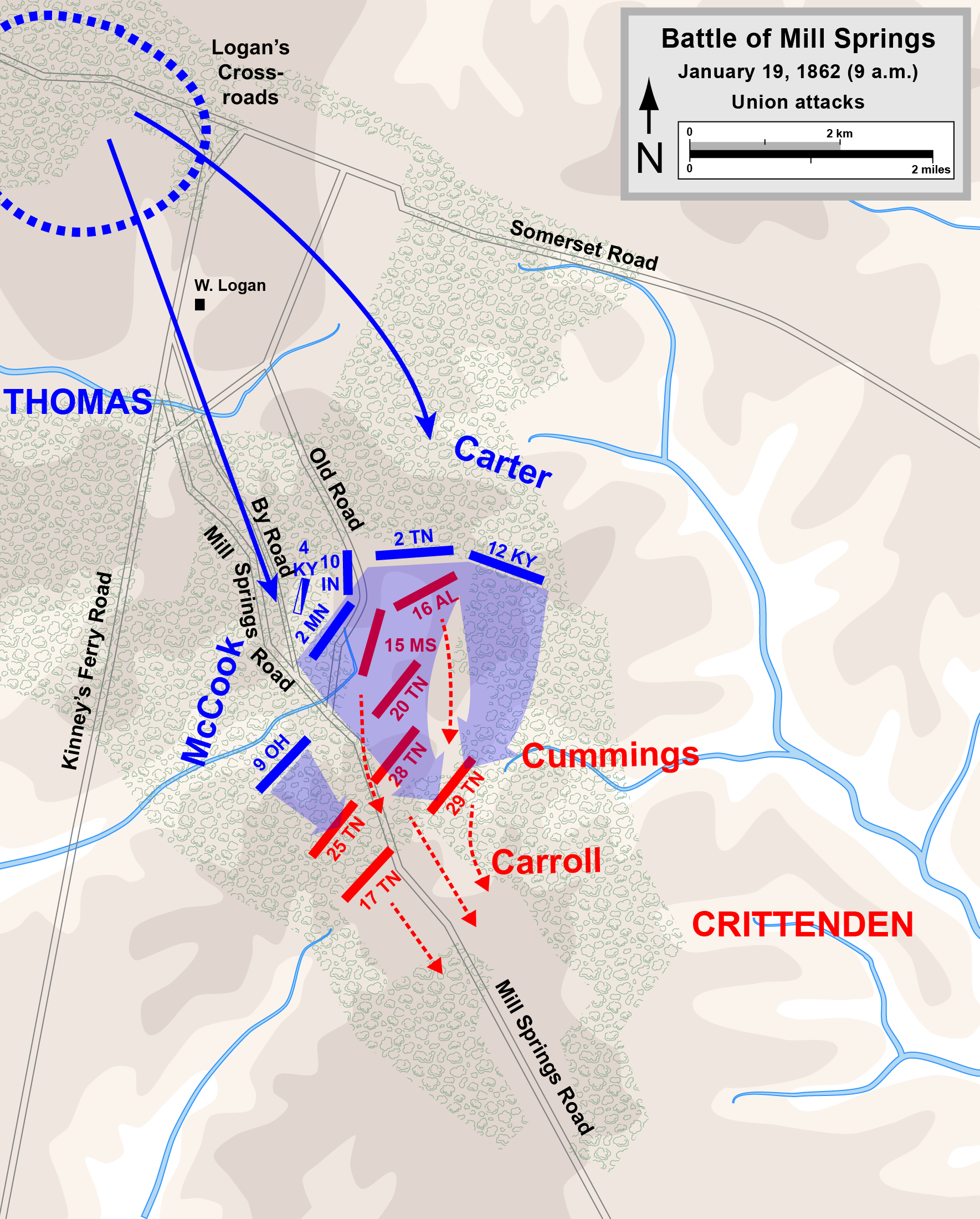
Battle of Mill Springs, Union attacks

The Confederate march through the night was hampered by rain and mud, and the troops arrived at Logan's Crossroads cold and miserable. Many of the men carried antique, Napoleonic-style flintlock muskets, which became almost useless in the wet weather. The slowness of the march had cost them the element of surprise.

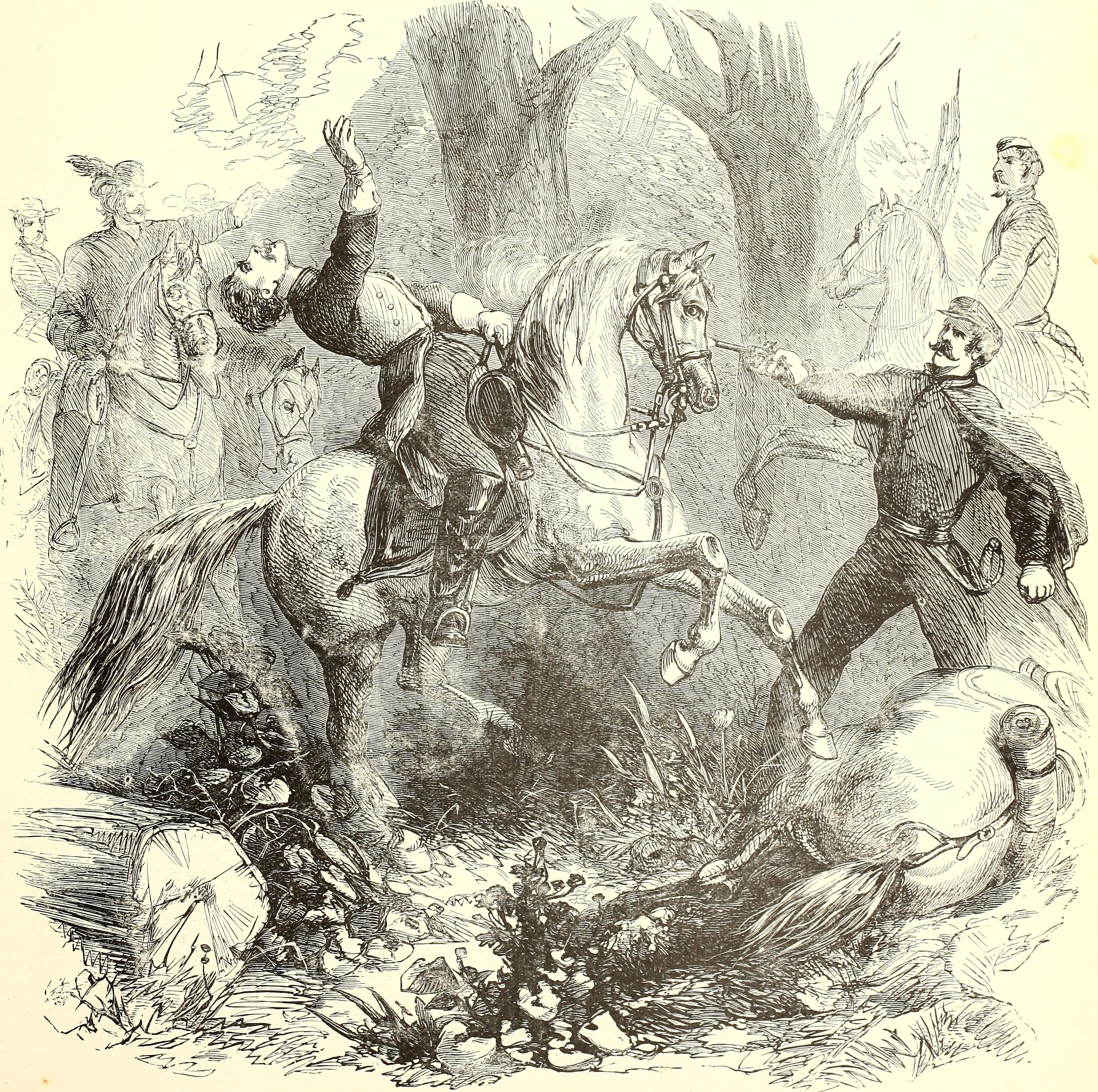
Shooting of Confederate general Zollicoffer by Colonel Fry

Nevertheless, they launched a spirited attack, led from the front by Zollicoffer, and achieved some initial success. The 15th Mississippi Infantry, 19th Tennessee Infantry, and 20th Tennessee Infantry pushed back companies of the (Union) 1st Kentucky Cavalry and the 10th Indiana Infantry.

In the poor visibility of the dark woods, clouded with gunsmoke, confusion reigned. Zollicoffer, who was conspicuous in front of his men with a white raincoat, mistakenly approached the Union 4th Kentucky Infantry under Col. Speed S. Fry, believing they were Confederates firing on their own men. Zollicoffer was shot and killed, allegedly by Col. Fry himself. The sudden death of their commander and heavy fire from Fry's regiment caused the center of the Confederate line to fall back momentarily in confusion. Crittenden rallied his men and ordered a general advance by Zollicoffer's brigade and the brigade of Brig. Gen. William H. Carroll.

At this point, Thomas arrived on the field and ordered the 9th Ohio Infantry to advance while the 2nd Minnesota Infantry maintained heavy fire from the front line. Col. Robert L. McCook, commanding Thomas's 3rd Brigade, wrote that the lines were so close that the "enemy and the Second Minnesota were poking their guns through the same fence." When the 9th Ohio turned the Confederate left flank, the battle was decided. The Confederate troops broke and ran back toward Mill Springs in a disorderly rout, and Crittenden, who was rumored to be drunk during the battle, was powerless to stop them. They frantically crossed to the south side of the Cumberland, abandoning twelve valuable artillery pieces, 150 wagons, more than 1,000 horses and mules, and all of their dead and wounded. The retreat continued all the way to Chestnut Mound, Tennessee, (near Carthage), about 50 miles (80 km) due east of Nashville.

== Aftermath ==
Casualties were relatively light. Union losses were 39 killed and 207 wounded, Confederate 125 killed and 404 wounded or missing. Crittenden's military career was also a casualty. Accused of drunkenness and treason, his army was disbanded and he was reassigned to be a corps commander under Buckner at Bowling Green. Within two months he was relieved of his command and arrested for a subsequent episode of drunkenness. In October 1862, after a court of inquiry ordered by General Braxton Bragg, Crittenden resigned as a general and served without rank on the staff of Brig. Gen. John S. Williams and other officers in western Virginia for the remainder of the war.

The Battle of Mill Springs, along with the Battle of Middle Creek on January 10, broke the main Confederate defensive line that was anchored in eastern Kentucky. Confederate fortunes in the state did not rise again until summer when Gen. Braxton Bragg and Maj. Gen. Kirby Smith launched their Kentucky Campaign, which culminated in the Battle of Perryville and Bragg's subsequent retreat. Mill Springs was the larger of the two Union Kentucky victories in January 1862. With these victories, the U.S. carried the war into Middle Tennessee in February.

== Battlefield today ==
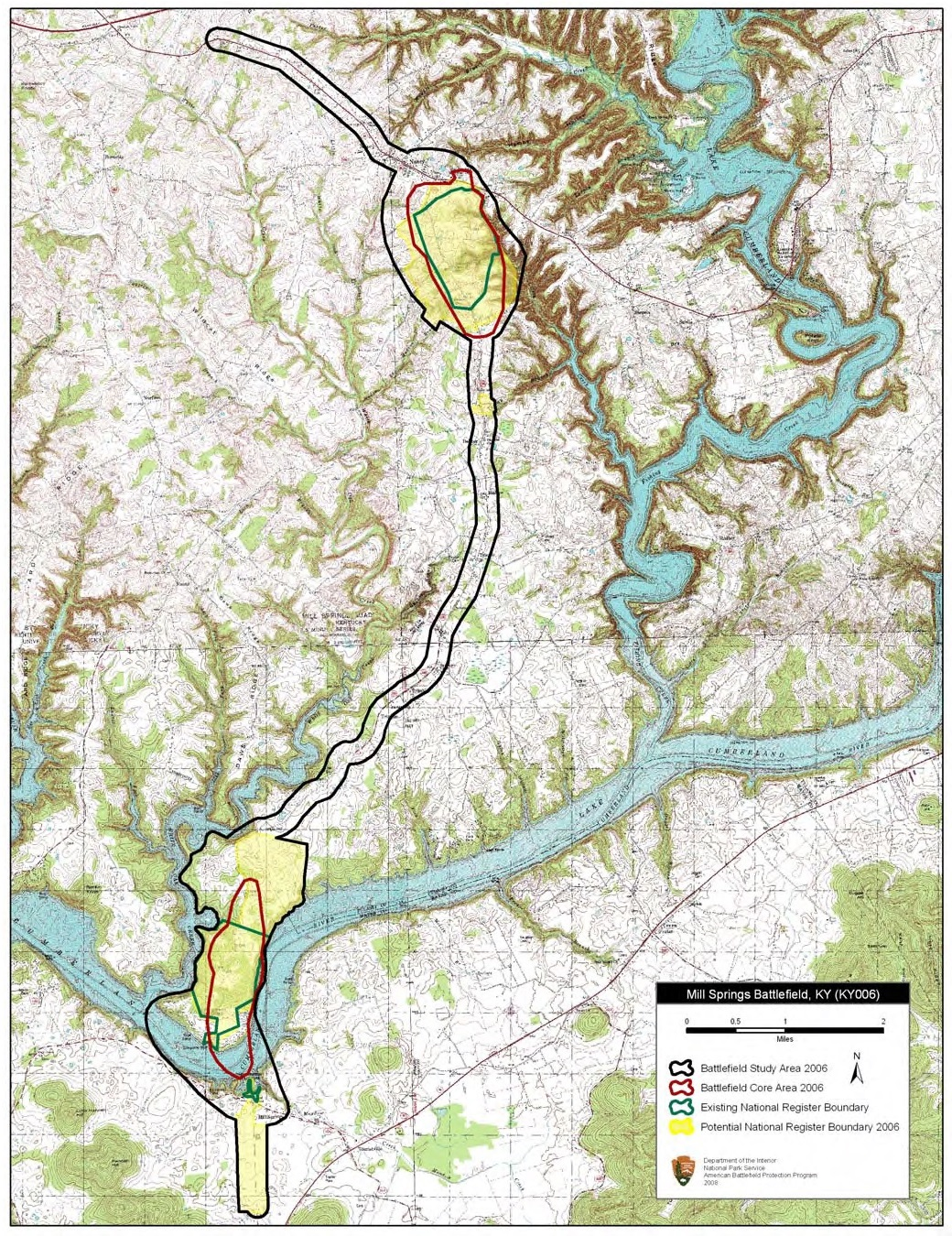
Map of Mill Springs Battlefield core and study areas by the American Battlefield Protection Program.

The Mill Springs battlefield is located in Pulaski County, not far from Nancy, Kentucky and also in Mill Springs in Wayne County across from the lake (the Cumberland River at the time of the battle). The historic town of Mill Springs, after which the battle was named, is actually across Lake Cumberland. This section of the battlefield, in Wayne County Kentucky, preserves the Brown-Lanier House and the West-Metcalfe House, two of the only remaining structures from the actual battle. Weekend guided tours are often available at the Brown-Lanier House in the summer months. To access this portion of the park on the south side of the lake one must travel via Highway 90 south towards Monticello and onto Highway 1275.

Portions of the battlefield in Pulaski county are preserved as a county park (named Zollicoffer Park in honor of the slain general). The Mill Springs Battlefield Association has protected portions of the battlefield by the acquisition of development rights to what is still a largely rural landscape, or by outright purchase. Zollicoffer Park contains the Confederate Cemetery, which consists of a mass grave. Nearby grave markers represent many of the fallen Confederate soldiers thought or confirmed to be in the mass grave itself. There is a corresponding Mill Springs National Cemetery in Nancy, where the Union dead were interred.

The battlefield, which covers about 105 acres (42 ha), was named by the United States Secretary of the Interior as one of the top twenty-five priority battlefields and is considered a historic landmark. The Zollie Tree was the tree attributed as the place Felix Zollicoffer fell; it no longer exists, the victim of a lightning strike, but the stump is marked. The American Battlefield Trust and its partners have acquired and preserved 769 acres at Mill Springs in 20 different land transactions from 1993 to 2023.

On November 4, 2006, the Mill Springs Battlefield Visitors Center and Museum was officially dedicated. Several commemorative ceremonies are held at the battlefield each year, including candlelight tours, living history presentations, and occasional re-enactments.

On January 15, 2013, Kentucky Representative Hal Rogers introduced the bill H.R. 298, officially titled "To direct the Secretary of the Interior to conduct a special resource study to evaluate the significance of the Mill Springs Battlefield located in Pulaski and Wayne Counties, Kentucky, and the feasibility of its inclusion in the National Park System, and for other purposes." Rogers said that "the Battle of Mill Springs is a source of great pride and interest to the people I serve." Rogers argued that the Battlefield was a "jewel" and would be "an excellent addition to the National Park Service." The John D. Dingell Jr. Conservation, Management, and Recreation Act, signed into law on March 12, 2019, established the site as Mill Springs Battlefield National Monument. After acquisition of property by the National Park Service the park was established as the 421st unit of the National Park System on September 22, 2020.

== See also ==
- List of battles fought in Kentucky
