= National Register of Historic Places listings in Pulaski County, Kentucky =

Location of Pulaski County in Kentucky

This is a list of the National Register of Historic Places listings in Pulaski County, Kentucky.

This is intended to be a complete list of the properties and districts on the National Register of Historic Places in Pulaski County, Kentucky, United States. The locations of National Register properties and districts for which the latitude and longitude coordinates are included below, may be seen in a map.

There are 43 properties and districts listed on the National Register in the county, 1 of which is a National Historic Landmark. Another property was once listed but has been removed.

This National Park Service list is complete through NPS recent listings posted July 11, 2025.

== Current listings ==
	Name on the Register	Image	Date listed	Location	City or town	Description
1	Battle of Dutton's Hill Monument	Battle of Dutton's Hill Monument	July 17, 1997 (#97000670)	Old Crab Orchard Rd., 1 mile north of the junction of Kentucky Routes 39 and 80; 37°07′03″N 84°36′14″W	Somerset	
2	Battle of Mill Springs Historic Areas	Battle of Mill Springs Historic Areas	February 18, 1993 (#93000001)	Three discontiguous areas: one south of Nancy, one in Mill Springs, and one to the north across the Cumberland River; 37°00′19″N 84°45′28″W	Nancy	
3	Beatty-Newell House	Beatty-Newell House	August 16, 1985 (#85001834)	Off Kentucky Route 90; 36°59′09″N 84°37′04″W	Bronston	
4	Boland House	Boland House	August 14, 1984 (#84001939)	Lakeshore Dr. 36°59′24″N 84°36′19″W	Burnside	
5	Buck-Mercer House		August 14, 1984 (#84001941)	Waynesburg Rd. 37°14′02″N 84°35′04″W	Somerset	
6	Burnside Historic District		August 14, 1984 (#84001944)	Lakeshore Dr. and French Ave. 36°59′12″N 84°36′11″W	Burnside	
7	Burnside Lodge	Burnside Lodge	August 14, 1984 (#84001946)	Off U.S. Route 27; 36°59′13″N 84°36′03″W	Burnside	A Masonic lodge building
8	Burnside Methodist Church	Burnside Methodist Church	August 16, 1985 (#85001836)	Off U.S. Route 27; 36°59′13″N 84°36′03″W	Burnside	
9	Confederate Mass Grave Monument in Nancy	Confederate Mass Grave Monument in Nancy	July 17, 1997 (#97000671)	Zollicoffer Park Cemetery, 0.3 miles south of the junction of Kentucky Routes 235 and 761; 37°03′20″N 84°44′22″W	Nancy	
10	Crawford House		August 14, 1984 (#84001952)	121 Maple St. 37°05′40″N 84°36′15″W	Somerset	Largest Victorian style house in the county, from c.1890; apparently moved or destroyed.
11	A. Jackson Crawford Building	A. Jackson Crawford Building	August 18, 1980 (#80001665)	207 S. Main St. 37°05′25″N 84°36′15″W	Somerset	
12	Dabney Post Office		August 14, 1984 (#84001954)	Kentucky Route 39; 37°10′57″N 84°33′00″W	Dabney	
13	Eubank Elementary School		April 17, 2025 (#100011666)	285 West Kentucky Highway 70; 37°16′33″N 84°38′56″W	Eubank	
14	Evans House		August 16, 1985 (#85001837)	Kentucky Route 461; 37°12′10″N 84°27′40″W	Shopville	
15	William Fox House	William Fox House	July 31, 1978 (#78001391)	206 W. Columbia St. 37°05′34″N 84°36′26″W	Somerset	
16	Gover-Hardin House	Gover-Hardin House	July 11, 2007 (#07000674)	307 W. Mt. Vernon St. 37°05′29″N 84°36′28″W	Somerset	
17	Harvey's Hill Historic District	Harvey's Hill Historic District	August 14, 1984 (#84001958)	401-527 N. Main St., and 402-526 N. Main St. 37°05′49″N 84°36′24″W	Somerset	
18	Hotel Beecher	Hotel Beecher	August 14, 1984 (#84001960)	203 S. Main St. 37°05′26″N 84°36′16″W	Somerset	
19	James-Hansford House		August 16, 1985 (#85001838)	On Kentucky Route 80; 37°09′29″N 84°28′40″W	Shopville	
20	James-Owens House		August 16, 1985 (#85001839)	Off Kentucky Route 80; 37°09′05″N 84°28′45″W	Shopville	
21	Mill Springs National Cemetery	Mill Springs National Cemetery	May 29, 1998 (#98000592)	9044 W. Kentucky Route 80; 37°04′06″N 84°44′14″W	Nancy	
22	Morrow House	Morrow House	August 14, 1984 (#84001962)	208 E. Oak St. 37°05′45″N 84°36′13″W	Somerset	
23	Nancy Elementary School		April 21, 2025 (#100011667)	240 Kentucky Highway 196; 37°04′20″N 84°45′18″W	Nancy	Historic Public Schools of Kentucky MPS
24	North Main Street Historic District	North Main Street Historic District	August 14, 1984 (#84001964)	N. Main and Columbia Sts. 37°05′26″N 84°36′16″W	Somerset	
25	Parker House	Parker House	August 14, 1984 (#84001970)	206 N. Vine St. 37°05′35″N 84°36′24″W	Somerset	
26	Payne House		August 16, 1985 (#85001840)	Off Kentucky Route 1247; 37°16′51″N 84°39′35″W	Eubank	
27	Payne Mill		August 14, 1984 (#84001968)	Off Kentucky Route 1247; 37°16′51″N 84°39′35″W	Eubank	
28	Dr. John Milton Perkins House	Dr. John Milton Perkins House	August 10, 1978 (#78001392)	109 N. Main St. 37°05′36″N 84°36′18″W	Somerset	
29	Pin Oak Site		November 13, 2023 (#100009538)	Address Restricted	Somerset vicinity	
30	Robinson Mill		August 14, 1984 (#84001971)	S. Main St. 37°04′55″N 84°36′41″W	Somerset	
31	Dill Scott House	Dill Scott House	August 14, 1984 (#84001972)	200 N. Main St. 37°05′40″N 84°36′21″W	Somerset	
32	Shopville Elementary School		April 21, 2025 (#100011689)	10 Shopville Road; 37°09′32″N 84°29′11″W	Somerset	Historic Public Schools of Kentucky MPS
33	Smith House	Smith House	August 14, 1984 (#84001974)	200 N. College St. 37°05′41″N 84°36′08″W	Somerset	
34	Beecher Smith House	Beecher Smith House	August 14, 1984 (#84001973)	405 College St. 37°05′53″N 84°36′10″W	Somerset	
35	Somerset Armory	Somerset Armory	September 6, 2002 (#02000926)	109 Grand Ave. 37°05′37″N 84°35′49″W	Somerset	
36	Somerset City School and Carnegie Library	Somerset City School and Carnegie Library	July 7, 1978 (#78001393)	300 College St. 37°05′45″N 84°36′06″W	Somerset	
37	Somerset Downtown Commercial District	Somerset Downtown Commercial District	August 27, 1982 (#82002742)	108-236 and 201-223 E. Mt. Vernon St. 37°05′32″N 84°36′15″W	Somerset	
38	South Courthouse Square Historic District	South Courthouse Square Historic District	August 14, 1984 (#84001975)	Public Sq., Zachary Way, W. Mt. Vernon, S. Main, and S. Maple Sts. 37°05′31″N 84°36′17″W	Somerset	
39	US Post Office-Bronston	US Post Office-Bronston	August 16, 1985 (#85001835)	Kentucky Route 790; 36°59′09″N 84°37′09″W	Bronston	
40	Waddle-Prather House	Waddle-Prather House	August 14, 1984 (#84001976)	311 N. College St. 37°05′50″N 84°36′09″W	Somerset	
41	West Columbia Street District	West Columbia Street District	August 14, 1984 (#84001977)	201-303 W. Columbia St. 37°05′32″N 84°36′24″W	Somerset	
42	Withers House		August 14, 1984 (#84001978)	116 Maple St. 37°05′37″N 84°36′15″W	Somerset	
43	Gen. Felix K. Zollicoffer Monument	Gen. Felix K. Zollicoffer Monument	July 17, 1997 (#97000672)	Zollicoffer Park Cemetery, 0.3 miles south of the junction of Kentucky Routes 235 and 761; 37°03′20″N 84°44′22″W	Nancy	

== Former listing ==
	Name on the Register	Image	Date listed	Date removed	Location	City or town	Description
1	City Hall		August 14, 1984 (#84001949)	July 25, 2012	400 E. Mt. Vernon St. 37°05′36″N 84°35′40″W	Somerset	Delisted due to extensive renovations.

== See also ==
- List of National Historic Landmarks in Kentucky
- National Register of Historic Places listings in Kentucky
