= Crawford House =

Crawford House may refer to:

== Canada ==
- Crawford House, Toronto, Ontario School house at the University of Toronto Schools

== United States ==
(by state then city)

- W.D. Crawford House, Cisco, Arkansas, listed on the National Register of Historic Places (NRHP) in Carroll County
- Crawford Hill Mansion, Denver, Colorado, listed on the NRHP in downtown Denver
- Crawford House (Manitou Springs, Colorado)
- Crawford House (Steamboat Springs, Colorado), NRHP-listed
- Crawford-Talmadge House, Hampton, Georgia, listed on the NRHP in Henry County
- Crawford-Shirley House, Lavonia, Georgia, listed on the NRHP in Georgia
- Crawford-Dorsey House and Cemetery, Lovejoy, Georgia, NRHP-listed
- Crawford-Whitehead-Ross House, Madison, Indiana, listed on the NRHP in Indiana
- Crawford House (Des Moines, Iowa), listed on the NRHP in Iowa
- Crawford House (Perryville, Kentucky), listed on the NRHP in Kentucky
- Crawford House (Somerset, Kentucky), listed on the NRHP in Kentucky
- Crawford House (Boston, Massachusetts), former hotel in Scollay Square
- Elias Crawford House, Worcester, Massachusetts, NRHP-listed
- Crawford House (Biloxi, Mississippi), a Mississippi Landmark
- Cahn-Crawford House, Meridian, Mississippi, NRHP-listed
- Crawford House (Crawford Notch, New Hampshire), a grand hotel in New Hampshire
- Crawford House Artist's Studio, Carroll, New Hampshire, NRHP-listed
- Crawford House (Toms River, New Jersey), listed on the NRHP in New Jersey
- John I Crawford Farm, Crawford, New York, NRHP-listed
- David Crawford House, Newburgh, New York, NRHP-listed
- Crawford House (Clinton, Oklahoma), listed on the NRHP in Oklahoma
- William Crawford House, Carmichaels, Pennsylvania, NRHP-listed
- John Minor Crawford House, Glassworks, Pennsylvania, NRHP-listed
- Crawford's Plantation House, Edisto Island, South Carolina, NRHP-listed
- Robert A. Crawford House, Chamberlain, South Dakota, listed on the NRHP in South Dakota
- Crawford-Pettyjohn House, Pierre, South Dakota, NRHP-listed
- Gideon Crawford House, Maryville, Tennessee, listed on the NRHP in Tennessee
- Theophilus Crawford House, Putney, Vermont, NRHP-listed
- Crawford-Gardner House, Charleston, West Virginia, NRHP-listed
