= Norfleet =

Norfleet may refer to:

== People with the surname ==
- Bobby Norfleet (born 1958), American race car driver
- Brett Norfleet (born 2004), American football player
- Celeste O. Norfleet (born 1959), American author
- Dennis Norfleet (born 1993), American football player
- Earl Norfleet Phillips (born 1940) American diplomat
- J. Frank Norfleet (1865–1967), American rancher and manhunter
- Julian Norfleet (born 1991), American basketball player
- Tia Norfleet (born 1986), American race car driver

== Places ==
- Norfleet, Kentucky, an unincorporated community
