= Evans House (Somerset, Kentucky) =

- U.S. National Register of Historic Places
- Location within Kentucky
- Nearest city: Shopville, Kentucky
- Coordinates: 37°12′10″N 84°27′40″W
- Area: 1 acre (0.40 ha)
- Built: c.1830
- Built by: Josiah Evans
- Architectural style: Gothic Revival
- MPS: Pulaski County MRA
- NRHP reference No.: 85001837
- Added to NRHP: August 16, 1985

The Evans House in Pulaski County, Kentucky near Shopville, Kentucky was built around 1830. It was listed on the National Register of Historic Places in 1985.

It is a one-and-a-half-story brick and frame house, with its main facade brick laid in Flemish bond, and other facades bricked with five-course common bond.

The house was burned in 1870 and then remodeled; in the remodeling triple Gothic Revival windows were added to the roof over the main facade, as "one of the few allusions to the Gothic Revival style in the county."

It is located on Kentucky Route 461.
