= Ringgold =

Ringgold may refer to:

== Places ==
=== United States ===
- Ringgold, Georgia, named after the soldier Samuel Ringgold
- Ringgold County, Iowa, named after the soldier Samuel Ringgold
- Ringgold, Kentucky, an unincorporated community
- Ringgold, Louisiana, named after the soldier Samuel Ringgold
- Ringgold, Maryland
- Ringgold, Nebraska
- Ringgold, Ohio
- Ringgold Township, Pennsylvania, named after the soldier Samuel Ringgold
- Ringgold, Pennsylvania
- New Ringgold, Pennsylvania
- Ringgold, Texas, named after the family of the founder's wife
- Ringgold, Virginia
- Ringgold, West Virginia
- Ringgold High School (Pennsylvania)
- Ringold Formation, Washington state geologic formation

=== Fiji ===
- Ringgold Isles

== People ==
- Cadwalader Ringgold (1802–1867), American naval officer, son of Samuel Ringgold, brother of the soldier Samuel Ringgold
- Faith Ringgold (1930–2024), African-American artist
- Issie Ringgold (1887–1952), American blues singer, vaudeville performer
- Samuel Ringgold (congressman) (1770–1829), Maryland congressman, soldier in the American Revolutionary War and War of 1812, father of Cadwalader Ringgold and the soldier Samuel Ringgold
- Samuel Ringgold (United States Army officer) (1796–1846), hero of Battle of Palo Alto in the Mexican–American War, after whom numerous communities are named; son of Samuel Ringgold, brother of Cadwalader Ringgold
- Samuel Ringgold Ward (1817–1866), American abolitionist, newspaper editor and Congregational church minister
- Tench Ringgold, 19th-century American businessman and political appointee
- Thomas Ringgold, (1715 – 1772) Maryland lawyer, slave trader and merchant

Also:

- Ring Lardner (1885–1933), full name Ringgold Wilmer Lardner, American writer

== Other uses ==
- Ringgold High School (Pennsylvania), Monongahela, Pennsylvania
- Ringgold identifier, a unique identifier for organisations in the publishing industry supply chain
- USS Ringgold (DD-89), named after Cadwalader Ringgold
- USS Ringgold (DD-500), named after Cadwalader Ringgold
- Battle of Ringgold Gap, in the American Civil War
