= Pisgah Presbyterian Church =

Pisgah Presbyterian Church may refer to:

- Pisgah Presbyterian Church (Somerset, Kentucky), listed on the National Register of Historic Places in Pulaski County, Kentucky
- Pisgah Presbyterian Church (Versailles, Kentucky), listed on the National Register of Historic Places in Woodford County, Kentucky
