= Crackers Neck, Kentucky =

Unincorporated community in Kentucky, United States

Crackers Neck
- Unincorporated community
- Location within the state of Kentucky Crackers Neck (the United States)
- Coordinates: 37°2′59″N 84°42′23″W
- Country: United States
- State: Kentucky
- County: Pulaski
- Elevation: 1,001 ft (305 m)
- Time zone: UTC-6 (Central (CST))
  - Summer (DST): UTC-5 (CST)
- GNIS feature ID: 2725852

Crackers Neck was an unincorporated community in Pulaski County, Kentucky, United States.
