= Goochtown, Kentucky =

Unincorporated community in Kentucky, United States

Goochtown
- Unincorporated community
- Location within the state of Kentucky Goochtown (the United States)
- Coordinates: 37°19′18″N 84°35′13″W
- Country: United States
- State: Kentucky
- County: Pulaski
- Elevation: 1,171 ft (357 m)
- Time zone: UTC-5 (Eastern (EST))
  - Summer (DST): UTC-4 (EST)
- GNIS feature ID: 508110

Goochtown is an unincorporated community in Pulaski County, Kentucky, United States.
