= Alcalde, Kentucky =

Unincorporated community in Kentucky, United States

- Unincorporated community
- Location within Kentucky
- Coordinates: 37°03′18″N 84°33′05″W
- Country: United States
- State: Kentucky
- County: Pulaski
- Elevation: 846 ft (258 m)
- Time zone: UTC-5 (Eastern (EST))
  - Summer (DST): UTC-4 (EDT)
- Area code: 606
- GNIS feature ID: 507382

Alcalde is an unincorporated community in Pulaski County, Kentucky, United States. Alcalde is located on Kentucky Route 769 at Pitman Creek, 4 miles (6.4 km) southeast of Somerset.
