= Tateville, Kentucky =

Unincorporated community in Kentucky, United States

- Unincorporated community
- Location within Kentucky
- Coordinates: 36°57′52″N 84°34′53″W
- Country: United States
- State: Kentucky
- County: Pulaski
- Elevation: 860 ft (260 m)
- Time zone: UTC-5 (Eastern (EST))
  - Summer (DST): UTC-4 (EDT)
- ZIP code: 42558
- Area code: 606
- GNIS feature ID: 515876

Tateville is an unincorporated community in Pulaski County, Kentucky, United States. Tateville is located along U.S. Route 27 and Kentucky Route 90 9 miles (14 km) south of Somerset. Tateville has a post office with ZIP code 42558.
