= Coin, Kentucky =

Unincorporated community in Kentucky, United States

Coin
- Unincorporated community
- Location within the state of Kentucky Coin (the United States)
- Coordinates: 37°10′30″N 84°30′37″W
- Country: United States
- State: Kentucky
- County: Pulaski
- Elevation: 945 ft (288 m)
- Time zone: UTC-6 (Central (CST))
  - Summer (DST): UTC-5 (CST)
- GNIS feature ID: 507726

Coin is an unincorporated community in Pulaski County, Kentucky, United States. The Coin Post Office closed in December 1934.
