= Delmer, Kentucky =

Unincorporated community in Kentucky, United States

Delmer
- Unincorporated community
- Location within the state of Kentucky Delmer (the United States)
- Coordinates: 37°1′44″N 84°44′5″W
- Country: United States
- State: Kentucky
- County: Pulaski
- Elevation: 978 ft (298 m)
- Time zone: UTC-5 (Eastern (EST))
  - Summer (DST): UTC-4 (EST)
- GNIS feature ID: 507840

Delmer is an unincorporated community in Pulaski County, Kentucky, United States.

== History ==
A post office, now closed, was established in 1903 and named for the first postmaster's infant son, Delmer.
