= Pointer, Kentucky =

Unincorporated community in Kentucky, United States

Coordinates: 37°07′58″N 84°46′02″W

Pointer is an unincorporated community in Pulaski County, Kentucky.

== History ==
A post office called Pointer was established in 1891, and remained in operation until 1985. The community was named after Pointer Creek. A variant name was "Hickory Nut".
