= Burnside Historic District =

Historic district in Kentucky, United States

- U.S. National Register of Historic Places
- Location within Kentucky Location within the United States
- Location: Lakeshore Dr. and French Ave., Burnside, Kentucky
- Coordinates: 36°59′12″N 84°36′11″W
- Area: 2.7 acres (1.1 ha)
- Architectural style: Queen Anne
- MPS: Pulaski County MRA
- NRHP reference No.: 84001944
- Added to NRHP: August 14, 1984

The Burnside Historic District, in Burnside, Kentucky, is a 2.7 acres (1.1 ha) historic district containing four contributing buildings which was listed on the National Register of Historic Places in 1984.

It includes Queen Anne architecture and is located around the intersection of Lakeshore Dr. and French Ave. in Burnside. They are also located along a ridge above Lake Cumberland. The historic homes are also located among modern homes built after the original Burnside was flooded. These 4 homes were the only homes to survive when the Wolf Creek Dam was built flooding the old town in 1951.

== General Information ==
The district consists of four frame homes surviving on Lakeshore Drive above the original location of Burnside. Its National Register nomination stated " The four homes in the district represent the most intact grouping of buildings associated with the historic residential area of Burnside. These homes are significant for their degree of architectural integrity and original setting and location. Adjacent to the houses are modern homes and older structures which have been altered. The four homes in the district were constructed in the late 19th and early 20th century on large residential lots. Together they give an indication of the original historical and architectural character of Burnside before the majority of the community was destroyed in 1951." The reason for building the Wolf Creek Dam and flooding the original town was to create a power station and to allow for recreational areas along Lake Cumberland.

== History of Old Burnside ==
The original town of Burnside, KY was located along the Cumberland River and was a prospering town for lumber and train stations. With the river it was very easy to transport lumber, so there were many lumber mills that were in the valley along the river. There were many large bridges that went over the river that the many trains would travel on 24/7. However, there was a need for more power and people wanted recreation areas, so the state decided to build the Wolf Creek Dam this would cause the Cumberland River to back up and form the Lake Cumberland. With the construction of this new dam the residents of Old Burnside knew that they would have to leave their homes and businesses and either move to another town or move to the new Burnside which was built on a nearby bluff (which is where the 4 historical homes are located). Many residents left because they were paid money to leave, but some didn't want to leave and didn't want the money the state was giving to them, but they were eventually pushed out.

Before the dam was fully completed, the homes, businesses, and bridges were demolished. However, even today there are remnants of the tunnels and roads that were once part of this town. When they demolished the bridges, and the lake was formed there was no way for the residents of Burnside to get to the other side of lake without getting on a boat that was very small and was not ideal for the waves that Lake Cumberland produced. They finally built many bridges over the lake for trains and cars to travel on instead of forcing people to go around the lake.

== The Architecture ==
- French House (c.1890), 508 Lakeshore Drive, a two-story frame Queen Anne style house, former home of Alonzo French who established the Burnside Manufacturing Company.
- Barton House (1889), 510 Lakeshore Drive, a two-story frame house in T-form plan with a porch with Tuscan columns.
- Riser House (c.1880), 512 Lakeshore Drive, a two-story weatherboarded house whose core is an early log house, built by Dr. L. B. Cook, operator of the first drugstore in Burnside.
- Jumonville House (c.1900), 514 Lakeshore Drive, a one-and-a-half-story frame house with a jerkinhead and an inset balcony on its main facade, and jerkinheads on other facades too.

== The Homes Today ==
Today these four homes are still standing and are a part of the new town of Burnside. They are located near the "downtown" of the town and are close to the Burnside Marina. The homes are privately owned by families and are not open to the public.
