= Etna, Kentucky =

Unincorporated community in Kentucky, United States

Coordinates: 37°13′33″N 84°34′49″W

Etna is an unincorporated community in Pulaski County, Kentucky, United States. It lies at an elevation of 1083 feet (330 m).
