= Bee Lick, Kentucky =

Unincorporated community in Kentucky, United States

Bee Lick
- Unincorporated community
- Location within the state of Kentucky Bee Lick (the United States)
- Coordinates: 37°19′43″N 84°30′10″W
- Country: United States
- State: Kentucky
- County: Pulaski
- Elevation: 1,076 ft (328 m)
- Time zone: UTC-5 (Eastern (EST))
  - Summer (DST): UTC-5 (EST)
- GNIS feature ID: 507474

Bee Lick is an unincorporated community in Pulaski County, Kentucky, United States. Their post office closed in 1910.
