= Jack Daws =

American artist

Jack Daws (born June 9, 1970) is a Seattle-based American artist. Working with assisted readymades, mixed media sculpture, and photography, his work addresses a range of socio-political and cultural issues.

== Early life and education ==
Daws was born in 1970 in Pulaski County, Kentucky, where he lived until 1991. At age twenty he accepted a scholarship to attend the Atlanta College of Art, but dropped out before completing the first semester.

== Art practice ==
Much of Daws's work reflects his interest in socio-political issues, particularly those of racial and cultural identity. Some of his most controversial works play on stereotypes of African American, Native American, and Mexican American culture. Seattle Post-Intelligencer art critic, Regina Hackett writes: "In Seattle, no white artist has pushed the edge of racial outrage as clearly as Jack Daws, who is hardwired to go over the line... He's not expressing hatred or taking a fast ride on any one hot button. All hot buttons are dear to him."

Other works have addressed the September 11 attacks (Two Towers, 2003), the Florida election recount in the 2000 U.S. presidential race (Serfs Up!, 2004), police brutality (Better You Than Me, 2007), the war on drugs (Misdemeanor Sculpture, 2001, Anywhere But Here, 2002, Ceci N'est Pas Une Bong, 2004), and Israel–United States relations (King of Israel, 2007). To date however, the work Daws is perhaps best known for is his piece entitled Counterfeit Penny, 2006.

== Counterfeit Penny, 2006 ==
In 2006, Daws hired metalsmiths to make a mold of a 1970 U.S. penny and cast it in 18-karat gold. He then hired another metalsmith to copper plate it. Wanting to see how it would age, he carried the sculpture in his pocket for six months, during which time it developed a brown patina just like an ordinary penny. On March 28, 2007, Daws intentionally put the 'penny' in circulation at Los Angeles International Airport. It was discovered in Brooklyn two and a half years later by Jessica Reed, a graphic designer and coin collector. Reed noticed it while paying for groceries at a Greenpoint C-Town. It seems that either the copper plating had begun to wear off, revealing the gold underneath, or it had oxidized in such a way as to give it a golden tint. Either way, it caught Reed's eye and she held on to it.

Reed carried the 'coin' in a change purse for months before doing a quick Internet search for "gold penny 1970." Within minutes she was directed to the website of Daws's Seattle art dealer, the Greg Kucera Gallery. There she read a copy of a 2007 press release that described the sculpture as being a little smaller than a real penny, and almost twice as heavy. Reed measured it and weighed it. In disbelief, she contacted the Kucera Gallery, and was put in touch with Daws. After a brief telephone conversation Daws confirmed that she had discovered the Counterfeit Penny sculpture. Jennifer 8. Lee of the New York Times wrote: "Most counterfeiting takes something that is nearly worthless and turns it into something perceived to have value. Mr. Daws did just the opposite. He took value – approximately $100 worth of gold – and turned it into something perceived as nearly worthless, one cent."

== Awards/collections ==
Daws received the Betty Bowen Award from the Seattle Art Museum in 2015, an Artist Trust/Washington State Arts Commission Fellowship in 2008, and a Pollock-Krasner Foundation Grant in 2006. He was a finalist for a 2013 Neddy at Cornish Award and received a 2013 Special Recognition Betty Bowen Award from the Seattle Art Museum.

His work is in the permanent collections of the Seattle Art Museum, the University of Washington's Henry Art Gallery, Tacoma Art Museum, and Western Bridge (William and Ruth True Collection).

His work was also included in the 2013 book Wild Art, published by Phaidon Press.
