= Burnside Methodist Church =

Historic church in Kentucky, United States

- Burnside United Methodist Church
- U.S. National Register of Historic Places
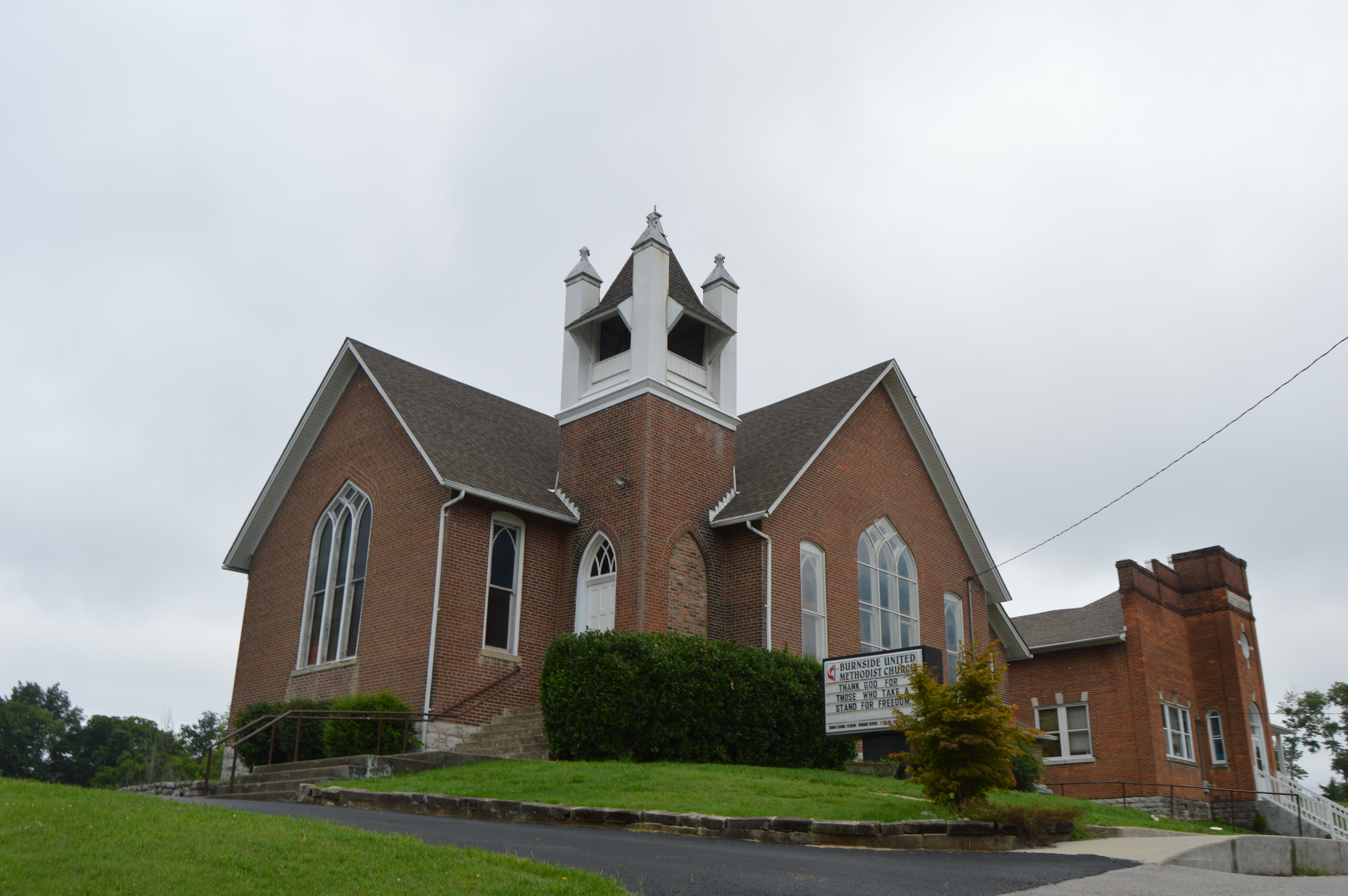
- Front (right) and southern side, with the Masonic Lodge behind

- Location within Kentucky Location within the United States
- Location: Off U.S. Route 27, Burnside, Kentucky
- Coordinates: 36°59′12″N 84°36′03″W
- Area: 2 acres (0.81 ha)
- Built: 1907 (church); 1902 (parsonage)
- Architectural style: Gothic
- MPS: Pulaski County MRA
- NRHP reference No.: 85001836
- Added to NRHP: August 16, 1985

The Burnside Methodist Church is a historic church off U.S. 27 in Burnside, Kentucky. It was built in 1907 and added to the National Register in 1985.

It is a cruciform-plan Victorian Gothic brick building on a rusticated limestone foundation.

The listing includes a church parsonage built in 1902 at cost of $900.00.
