= Wabd, Kentucky =

Unincorporated community in Kentucky, United States

Wabd
- Unincorporated community
- Location within the state of Kentucky Wabd (the United States)
- Coordinates: 37°18′48″N 84°23′23″W
- Country: United States
- State: Kentucky
- County: Rockcastle
- Elevation: 1,122 ft (342 m)
- Time zone: UTC-5 (Eastern (EST))
  - Summer (DST): UTC-4 (EST)
- GNIS feature ID: 509297

Wabd, is an unincorporated community in Rockcastle County, Kentucky, United States. It was also called Green Yard. The name refers to the post office founder William A. B. Davis.

It is located on Kentucky Route 1250 just north of its terminus on Kentucky Route 461.
