= Tia Norfleet =

American stock car racing and dragster driver

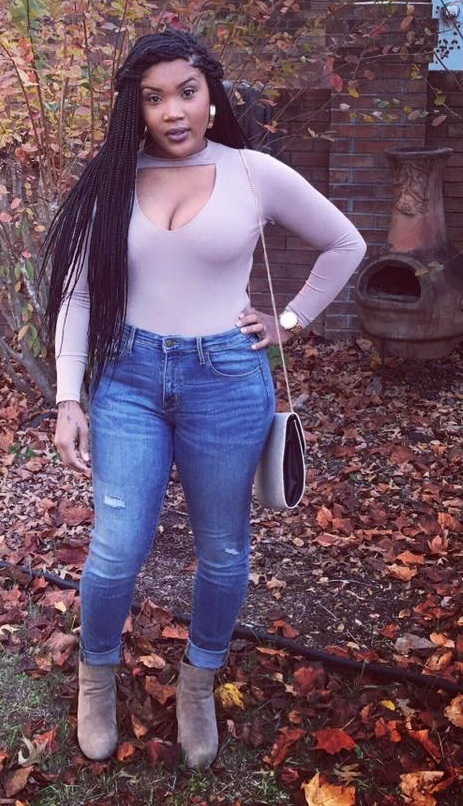
- Norfleet in 2017
- Born: Shauntia Latrice Norfleet; May 1, 1986 (age 40) Suffolk, Virginia, U.S.

Shauntia Latrice Norfleet (born May 1, 1986) is the first African American woman to hold a NASCAR driver’s license. The daughter of NASCAR driver Bobby Norfleet, she has completed 1 lap in a late model.

== Personal life ==
Born in Suffolk, Virginia in 1986, Norfleet's interest in racing began at age 7, when her father, NASCAR driver Bobby Norfleet, doubled the battery power of a Hot Wheels Barbie car to increase its speed. Norfleet claims her racing career began at age 14, when she began competing in kart racing events; she went on to attempt a career in drag racing at the local and regional level.

In 2000, Norfleet switched to entry level spec racing competing in Bandolero cars, then moving to late model stock car racing on short tracks starting with the 2004 racing season; she became the first female African-American driver to purchase a NASCAR Late Model Series racing license.

Norfleet attended local late model events at tracks near her Augusta, Georgia home, starting her Late Model career in 2004. She claimed to begin competing in NASCAR national touring series competition starting in the summer of 2012, and was operating a grassroots funding initiative, claiming it would finance her racing career; however she did not make it to the track in a major series in 2012.

== Controversy ==
In March 2013, a New York Times article reported that there were numerous inconsistencies in Norfleet's self-promotion efforts. They observe that she has only raced in one low level event, where she ran one lap before parking her car. She also has several criminal offenses on her record, and according to public records is actually 26 years old, not 24 as she has claimed; in addition, the NASCAR license that she has received was the first to be received by an African-American woman. After Norfleet publicly stated this, NASCAR's vice president for public affairs said, “I am uncomfortable with Tia representing herself in the way that she has.” Norfleet responded that the accusations were "a biased, smear campaign". Her father responded to the allegations by calling them a "witchhunt", by posting pictures of Tia's name on four separate licenses, although it's unclear why because she is the first African-American woman to retain such a license regardless of how many she has. He did stand by his daughter by refuting some of the allegations. Tia confirmed that she did indeed have a criminal record, and that her only NASCAR event was indeed a "start and park", but also stated that she had never claimed to be a Nationwide Series driver even though she was shown with a NNS patch on her firesuit, which could be purchased from several different sources.

== Charitable work ==
Norfleet supports the Safe Teen Georgia Driving Academy program, providing driving instruction at Atlanta Motor Speedway on behalf of the group; in addition she is an ambassador for Safe America Driving.
