= Kentucky Route 461 =

State highway in Kentucky, United States

Kentucky Route 461
- KY 461 highlighted in red

Route information
- Maintained by KYTC
- Length: 18.015 mi (28.992 km)

Major junctions
- South end: KY 80 in Shopville
- KY 934 near Level Green; US 150 west of Mount Vernon
- North end: US 25 in Mount Vernon

Location
- Country: United States
- State: Kentucky
- Counties: Pulaski, Rockcastle

Highway system
- Kentucky State Highway System; Interstate; US; State; Parkways
| ← US 460 | → KY 462 |

Kentucky Route 461 (KY 461) is a 18.015-mile-long (28.992 km) state highway in the U.S. state of Kentucky. The highway connects mostly rural areas of Pulaski and Rockcastle counties with Mount Vernon.

== Route description ==
=== Pulaski County ===
KY 461 begins at an interchange with KY 80 (Hal Rogers Parkway) southeast of Mark, within the central part of Pulaski County. It travels to the north-northwest and curves to the northeast. It crosses over Flat Lick Creek and then passes Bobbitt Cemetery. It intersects the western terminus of KY 1677 (Tommy Road). It then intersects the southern terminus of KY 3268 (Old Mt. Vernon Road) before traveling through Valley Oak. It crosses over Buck Creek and then crosses over Latham Branch twice. The highway curves to the north-northeast and intersects the eastern terminus of KY 934 before it enters Rockcastle County.

=== Rockcastle County ===
KY 461 has an intersection with both the western terminus of KY 1152 (Blue Springs Road) and the eastern terminus of KY 3273. It then curves to the northeast and crosses over Browne Fork and then the West Fork Skegg Creek. The highway curves to the north-northeast and intersects the southern terminus of KY 1250 (Sand Springs Road) and then the southern terminus of KY 2549 (White Rock Road). It curves to the northeast and intersecting U.S. Route 150 (US 150; New Brodhead Road / Crab Orchard Road). KY 461 then enters Mount Vernon. It intersects KY 1326 (Old Brodhead Road). The highway temporarily leaves the city limits and curves to the east-northeast. When it re-enters the city, it meets its northern terminus, an intersection with US 25 (Richmond Street).

== Major intersections ==
| County | Location | mi | km | Destinations | Notes |
|---|---|---|---|---|---|
| Pulaski | | 0.000 | 0.000 | KY 80 (Hal Rogers Parkway) to Cumberland Expressway – Lake Cumberland, Cedar Creek Vineyards | Interchange; southern terminus |
| Pulaski | | 1.746 | 2.810 | KY 1677 east (Tommy Road) | Western terminus of KY 1677 |
| Pulaski | | 2.546 | 4.097 | KY 3268 north (Old Mt. Vernon Road) | Southern terminus of KY 3268 |
| Pulaski | | 8.451 | 13.601 | KY 934 west | Eastern terminus of KY 934 |
| Rockcastle | | 9.233 | 14.859 | KY 1152 east (Blue Springs Road) / KY 3273 west – Hansford, Willailla | Western terminus of KY 1152; eastern terminus of KY 3273 |
| Rockcastle | | 12.824 | 20.638 | KY 1250 north – Wabd | Southern terminus of KY 1250 |
| Rockcastle | | 13.407 | 21.576 | KY 2549 north (White Rock Road) | Southern terminus of KY 2549 |
| Rockcastle | | 15.509 | 24.959 | US 150 (New Brodhead Road / Crab Orchard Road) to I-75 south – Stanford, Mt. Vernon | |
| Rockcastle | Mount Vernon | 16.584 | 26.689 | KY 1326 (Old Brodhead Road) – Brodhead | |
| Rockcastle | Mount Vernon | 18.015 | 28.992 | US 25 (Richmond Street) to I-75 – London, Berea | Eastern terminus |
1.000 mi = 1.609 km; 1.000 km = 0.621 mi
