= Blue John, Kentucky =

Unincorporated community in Kentucky, United States

Blue John
- Unincorporated community
- Location within the state of Kentucky Blue John (the United States)
- Coordinates: 36°55′47″N 84°28′59″W
- Country: United States
- State: Kentucky
- County: Pulaski
- Elevation: 1,168 ft (356 m)
- Time zone: UTC-6 (Central (CST))
  - Summer (DST): UTC-5 (CST)
- GNIS feature ID: 510803

Blue John is an unincorporated community in Pulaski County, Kentucky, United States. Blue John is geographically close to cities like Burnside, Elihu, and Ruth. The area is primarily residential, with scattered historical and genealogical records.
