= Oak Hill, Kentucky =

Unincorporated community in Kentucky, United States

Coordinates: 37.0581325°N 84.6463309°W

Oak Hill is an unincorporated community in Pulaski County, in the U.S. state of Kentucky.

Originally, Oak Hill takes its name from a Baptist church of the same name on a hill with oak trees.

== Education ==
Oak Hill Elementary School, also sometimes initialized as OES, is a public elementary school in the community. It is under the administration of Pulaski County Schools. The school provides education to grades 1–5. After attending OES, students attend Southern Middle School, then attend Southwestern High School.
