= Safe America Foundation =

American non-profit organization

The Safe America Foundation
- Company type: Nonprofit organization
- Industry: Emergency Preparedness & Safety
- Founded: 1994
- Headquarters: Marietta, GA, United States
- Key people: Len Pagano, President & CEO
- Revenue: 816,902 United States dollar (2017)
- Total assets: 184,773 United States dollar (2022)
- Website: safeamerica.org

The Safe America Foundation is a 501(c)(3) non-profit organization working nationally and headquartered in Marietta, Georgia. The organization was founded in 1994 and partners with corporate, government, public and private sector organizations and non-profit organization to improve the awareness of safety and preparedness in the United States. The Safe America Foundation operates an Emergency Preparedness program and Driver Education program.

== Emergency preparedness ==
=== 9/11 Drill Down for Safety ===
The 9/11 Drill Down for Safety Campaign–launched in 2009—promotes the planning and execution of preparedness drills. The overall goal of the campaign is to create a culture of preparedness. The campaign works with families, businesses, public institutions and non-governmental organizations to demonstrate preparedness through drills, exercises, text emergency alerts, building an emergency preparedness kit and other various activities.

In 2009, the Safe America Foundation focused on getting businesses—medium-sized to large-sized—to organize emergency drills leading up to the anniversary of September 11 attacks. Safe America created three scenarios where businesses had to practice an emergency drill. These scenarios included a power outage, a flood, and a pandemic. The Safe America Foundation also conducted a national drill during a meeting in January 2009 in Chicago, Illinois. The meeting was hosted by Federal Emergency Management Agency (FEMA) V Regional Administrator Edward Buikema. The organization also focused on creating the campaign around the FEMA's 10 regional hubs. Safe America's online Pledge to Drill form was also introduced in 2009. The online campaign was promoted through Facebook and Twitter, with the 30-day blitz beginning in mid August 2009. The campaign resulted in over 400,000 people participating in the program with support from over 20 firms.

The campaign ended in September 2009, and had accomplished the following:

1. A National Pledge to Drill Campaign that occurred during August
2. Test Drills organized in 10 national sites including: UPS Headquarters in Atlanta; Office Depot Headquarters in Boca Raton, Florida; CNA Insurance and Motorola in Chicago; Michigan State University in Lansing; Medical Reserve Corps in Phoenix; Dilworth Paxson and PATCO Speedline in Philadelphia; a UPS regional location in Richmond; 16 high schools in San Diego; a Federal Building in San Francisco; and the suburban community of Lindon, Utah.
3. Online Training - A total of six webinars and online training events were held for small and medium size businesses. Topics included: Drills: Why and How to Plan for an Emergency, Creating Business and Community Drills, Personal Emergency Planning and Preparation, Protecting Employees: Legal Responsibilities, Critical Messages: How to Communicate, Creating Business Continuity Planning: Process and Program, Protecting Special Need Populations

In 2010, the Safe America Foundation kicked off its 9/11 Drill Down for Safety Campaign with leadership from Former First Lady of West Virginia Gayle Manchin and West Virginia Business Volunteer Co-Chair Sam Cipoletti. The 9/11 Drill Down for Safety campaign continued to work with businesses, communities and families to have an emergency preparedness drill practiced before or on the day of September 11, 2010.

==== Ex'pression College Contest ====
In 2010, Safe America held a contest at Ex'pression College for Digital Arts, located in San Francisco, California, for current students or recent alumni to produce the best Public Service Announcement on the use of texting in an emergency. The PSA was 30 seconds long, and it supported and promoted awareness of Safe America's Text First. Talk Second. drill, which was scheduled for September 11, 2010. The winner of the PSA contest won $1,000 in cash, a chance to fly to New York City for the winning PSA preview at NBC Headquarters and an opportunity to have their work critiques by top animation expert Fred Seibert.

==== Federal Signal Survey ====
Federal Signal's 2010 Public Safety, developed in partnership with the Safe America Foundation and Zogby International, revealed consumer attitudes and preferences in Emergency situations. Results to the survey were announced at the Safe America Foundation's 9/11 Drill Down for Safety briefing at USA Today Headquarters on December 1, 2010.

The survey announced that half of the respondents (47%) do not have an emergency plan, while 46% do. The survey also reported that Americans who live in the West and/or living in the rural areas are more likely to have family or household plans in place versus those who live in the East and/or those that live in larger cities. The survey also said that one if four Americas prefer to be notified of an emergency by telephone (26%) or by television (25%). 18% said they would like to be notified by text message and 15% would like to be notified by outdoor loud speakers. One in 10 Americans prefers that they be notified by radio.

==== First Spouses Campaign ====
The First Spouses Campaign was developed under the 9/11 Drill Down for Safety in 2010. Spearheaded by Former First Lady of West Virginia Gayle Manchin, the campaign was designed to involve spouses from governors in all states to encourage their citizens to take part in the Text First. Talk Second. drill.

==== Text First. Talk Second. ====
Text First. Talk Second. is Safe America's initiative to use texting communications rather than voice communications in the event of an emergency. Voice communication is often overwhelmed in an event of a disaster, and Safe America encourages individuals to use a new safety shorthand – 7865 (RUOK) and 4665 (IMOK) – to communicate with loved ones during an emergency.

==== March to 1 Million Campaign ====
Launched in late 2010, The March to 1 Million Campaign is a remembrance campaign for the 10th year anniversary of the September 11th attacks. The campaign will continue Safe America's Text First. Talk Second initiative, with the safety shorthand being practiced during a national preparedness drill day on Sunday, September 11, 2011 and the involvement with the First Spouses and a new partnership with the National Foundation for Women Legislators. New features of Safe America's 9/11 Drill Down for Safety: March to 1 Million Campaign includes:

1. A partnership with the National Foundation of Women Legislators (NFWL). The Safe America Foundation is asking more than 2,000 elected women to be trained to be community leaders by promoting Text First. Talk Second. Safe America will also hold a special workshop at the NFWL's annual conference in Des Moines, Iowa, and it will help elected officials model practice texting drills within their own families. Women will be advised on how to mobilize their own citizens during Town Hall Meeting and will be filmed for TV spots that will be distributed to NBC, Telemundo and other local broadcast media.
2. Providing classroom curriculum for schools, while holding town hall meetings where Safe America explores what Americans feel they can do to support a culture of being Prepared, Not Scared.
3. A new cell phone application that allows individuals to pre-load valuable information that can reduce the time taken for them to stay in touch with other in a post-emergency situation.

===== Goals =====
In 2011, Safe America has set a goal to engage 100 firms to pledge to:

1. Conduct texting drills
2. Teach employees to drill and take the concept home to educate their families during National Preparedness Month in September
3. Help fund ongoing activities of the 'Safe Team' coalition over the next five years.

== Teen Driving Academy ==
Safe America offers a Driver Education program that is licensed by the Georgia Department of Driver Services. Since the beginning, The Safe America Foundation has partnered with corporate foundations and state governments on initiatives such as the Baby Buckle Program, which provided discounted car seats in twenty states. The organization also works with companies and other groups to create meaningful educational initiatives, including media campaigns, that encourage adults and youth to modify harmful behaviors and ensure their lifelong wellness.

=== Safe Teen Georgia Driving Academy ===
The SafeTeen Georgia Driving Academy is an annual driving safety expo produced by the Safe America Foundation and held in May in metro Atlanta.

This expo allows teens 14 or older and their parents/guardians to learn the basics of safe driving through engaging interactive presentations and demonstrations taught by Safe America Foundation training staff, law enforcement, fire fighters, emergency medical personnel and judges.

Begun in 2002 as the Teen Driving Institute, the Driving Academy was initially a weekday driving safety event for metro-Atlanta high school students held in the parking lot of Lockheed Martin Marietta, Georgia facility. In an acknowledgement that parental involvement has a major impact on teen driving habits, the Foundation decided to move the event to the weekend. From 2005 to 2012, the Atlanta Motor Speedway served as the Driving Academy's home. In 2013, the event moved to Cobb Galleria Centre.

Since Driving Academy's inception it has provided more than 10,000 attendees tips and tools to make them safer drivers and is now regarded as one of the largest events of its kind in the Southeast.

=== Safe Communities ===
The Safe America Foundation is funded by the Governor's Office of Highway Safety with an overall goal to raise awareness of safe driving behaviors and prevent crashes, injuries and fatalities under Cobb Safe Communities. The program addresses various driving issues for middle and high school students, senior citizens and businesses. The program delivers:

1. Safe driving presentations to middle schools and high schools.
2. Seat belt checks at various high schools around the community.
3. Lunch and Learn programs at local businesses on traffic safety topics.
4. "Car Smarts" programs for senior citizens.

=== House Resolution 1863 ===
Representatives Smith of Georgia's 13th congressional district, Post 2, Cummings of the 19th Georgia District, and Lewis of Georgia District 12 signed House Resolution 1863 commending and recognizing Safe America's efforts to increase driver education.
