= Withers House (Somerset, Kentucky) =

- U.S. National Register of Historic Places
- Location within Kentucky
- Location: 116 Maple St., Somerset, Kentucky
- Coordinates: 37°05′37″N 84°36′15″W
- Area: 0.2 acres (0.081 ha)
- Built: c.1890
- Architectural style: Queen Anne
- MPS: Pulaski County MRA
- NRHP reference No.: 84001978
- Added to NRHP: August 14, 1984

The Withers House in Somerset, Kentucky, at 116 Maple St., was built in 1890. It was listed on the National Register of Historic Places in 1984.

It was described in 1984 as one of Somerset's "largest and best preserved Queen Anne style homes." It is or was a two-story brick house with a one-story frame porch having Tuscan columns upon brick piers, and having a corner octagonal tower.

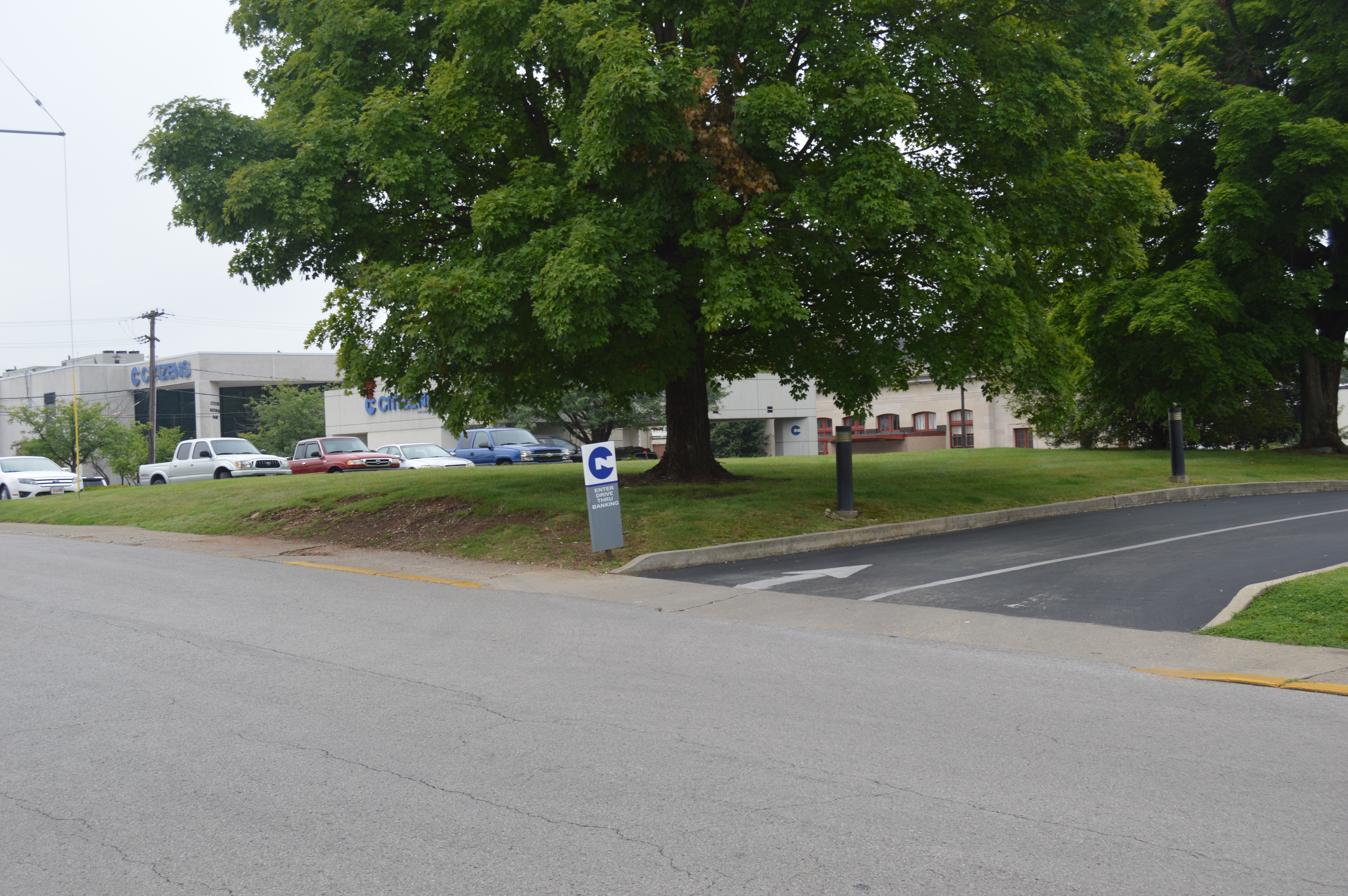
Photo of site

The house may have been moved or destroyed.
