= Bobby Norfleet =

American racing driver

- Born: July 7, 1958 (age 68); Philadelphia, Pennsylvania, U.S.

NASCAR FedEx Freight Truck Series career
- 1 race run over 1 year
- Best finish: 82nd (2000)
- First race: 2000 Line-X 225 (Portland)
Wins	Top tens	Poles
0	0	0

Robert Norfleet (born July 7, 1958) is an American former professional racing driver. He has raced motorcycles, drag cars, and in stock car racing, which included attempts in the NASCAR Craftsman Truck Series and the ARCA Re/Max Series.

== Racing career ==
=== NASCAR / 2000 controversy ===
In 2000, Norfleet announced he would field and drive his own team in the NASCAR Craftsman Truck Series, but was unable to come up with sponsorship. In an effort to help Norfleet, Brian France, who at the time was NASCAR Vice President, called a number of companies who were interested in sponsoring a NASCAR team, and even flew in some company executives, to see if they could work a deal and sponsor Norfleet so he could attempt races. Norfleet came up with sponsorship from 40 Street Records and So So Def Records. Norfleet failed to qualify for his first race at Martinsville Speedway.

Norfleet made his NASCAR debut at the Portland International Raceway road course. He competed against Bill Lester in that race. Norfleet qualified 11 miles per hour slower than the pole speed, but made the race after 33 cars qualified for 34 spots. He finished 32nd after he suffered handling problems. He was also black-flagged three times by NASCAR for not maintaining the required minimum speed. By comparison, Lester ran the full race and finished 24th.

In the next race at Pikes Peak International Raceway, Norfleet's entry was denied by NASCAR officials, as he was not licensed to run tracks larger than a mile. NASCAR requires drivers to either show proficiency on shorter tracks, or have some experience on one mile and larger tracks in a lower series before they are allowed to race on larger tracks. Norfleet claimed the decision was racially motivated, and people protested outside NASCAR's headquarters. After failing to qualify for his next race at Evergreen Speedway, he stopped running NASCAR; he stated he intended to file suit over the issue, though no suit was filed.

=== Post-racing career ===
Norfleet returned to NASCAR as a car owner in 2005. Bobby Norfleet Racing fielded the No. 24 Chevrolet Monte Carlo for Mike Harmon in a Busch Series race at Memphis Motorsports Park, but the entry failed to qualify. Norfleet had announced his team would compete in the Busch Series and the NEXTEL Cup Series in 2006, but did not field an entry.

== Personal life ==
Norfleet's daughter, Tia Norfleet, attempted to follow in her father's footsteps and reach NASCAR, but only competed in one race in the NASCAR Whelen All-American Series. Tia became the first African American female to obtain a NASCAR license.

Norfleet currently resides on an estate in central New Jersey where he coaches young athletes and teaches them the lessons he learned in his brief career.

== Motorsports career results ==
=== NASCAR ===
(key) (Bold – Pole position awarded by qualifying time. Italics – Pole position earned by points standings or practice time. * – Most laps led.)

==== Craftsman Truck Series ====
NASCAR Craftsman Truck Series results
Year	Team	No.	Make	1	2	3	4	5	6	7	8	9	10	11	12	13	14	15	16	17	18	19	20	21	22	23	24	NCTC	Pts	Ref
2000	Larry Norfleet	34	Chevy	DAY	HOM	PHO	MMR	MAR; DNQ	PIR; 32	GTY	MEM	PPR	EVG; DNQ	TEX	KEN	GLN	MLW	NHA	NZH	MCH	IRP	NSV	CIC	RCH	DOV	TEX	CAL	82nd	156	

=== ARCA Re/Max Series ===
(key) (Bold – Pole position awarded by qualifying time. Italics – Pole position earned by points standings or practice time. * – Most laps led.)

ARCA Re/Max Series results
Year	Team	No.	Make	1	2	3	4	5	6	7	8	9	10	11	12	13	14	15	16	17	18	19	20	21	22	23	ARMC	Pts	Ref
2007	James Hylton Motorsports with Carter 2 Motorsports	48	Dodge	DAY	USA	NSH	SLM	KAN	WIN	KEN	TOL	IOW	POC	MCH	BLN	KEN	POC	NSH	ISF	MIL	GTW	DSF	CHI	SLM	TAL; DNQ	TOL	N/A	-	

== Sources ==
- Bobby Norfleet Announces New Program
- Driver says NASCAR is keeping him parked because he is black
- Driving into history
