= Crawford-Whitehead-Ross House =

Historic house in Indiana, United States

- U.S. National Register of Historic Places
- U.S. Historic district – Contributing property
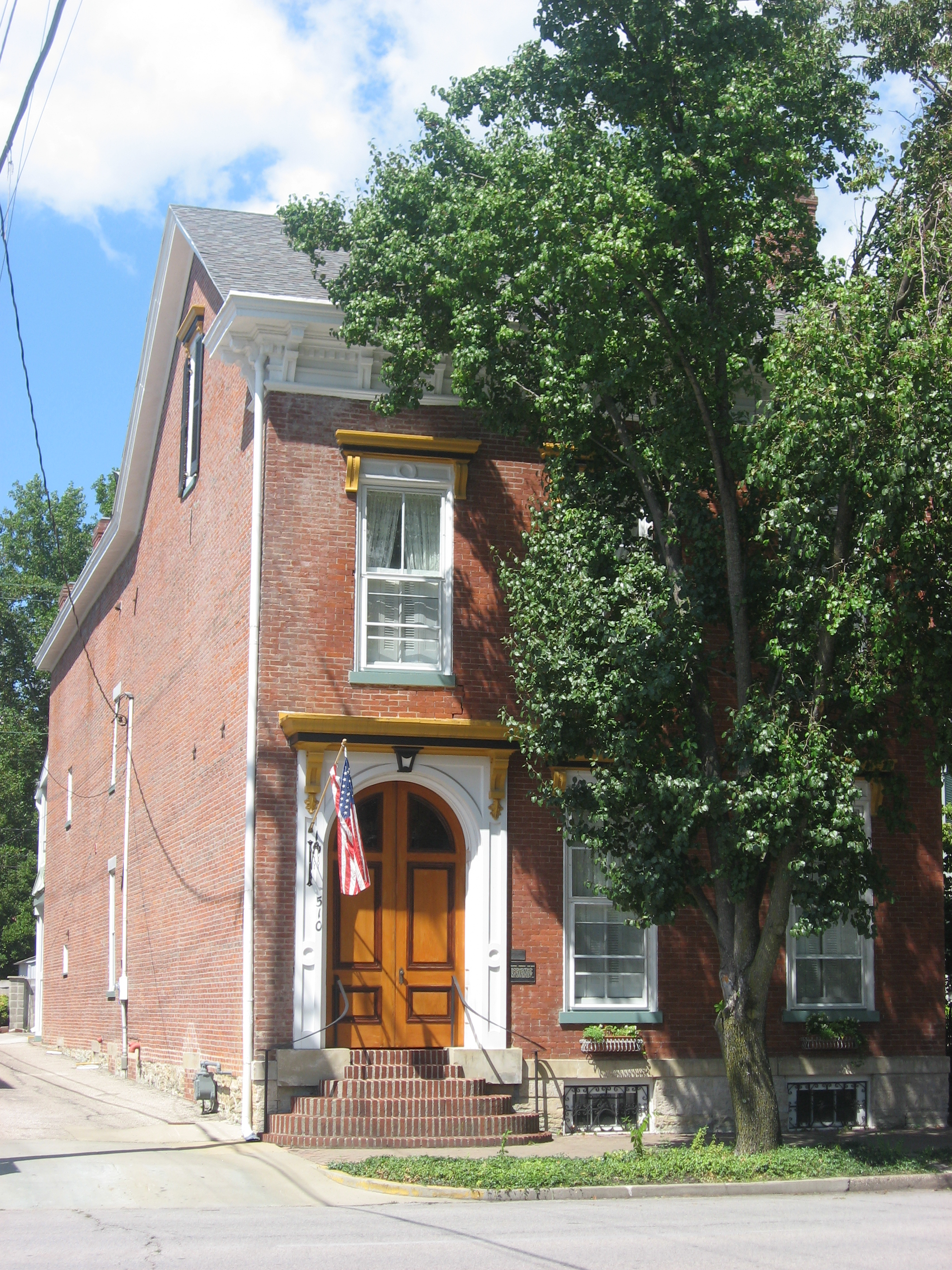
- Crawford-Whitehead-Ross House, July 2012

- Location within Indiana Location within the United States
- Location: 510 W. Main St., Madison, Indiana
- Coordinates: 38°44′14″N 85°23′7″W
- Area: less than one acre
- Built: c. 1833, c. 1852-1853, c. 1871
- Architectural style: Italianate, Federal
- NRHP reference No.: 92001648
- Added to NRHP: November 27, 1992

Crawford-Whitehead-Ross House is a historic home located at Madison, Indiana. It was built about 1833, and is a two-story, Federal style brick dwelling with a side hall plan. The house was enlarged about 1852-1853 modified about 1871 in the Italianate style with the addition of metal window detailing and an elaborate cornice.

It was listed on the National Register of Historic Places in 1992. It is located in the Madison Historic District.
