= Crawford–Pettyjohn House =

Historic house in South Dakota, United States

- U.S. National Register of Historic Places
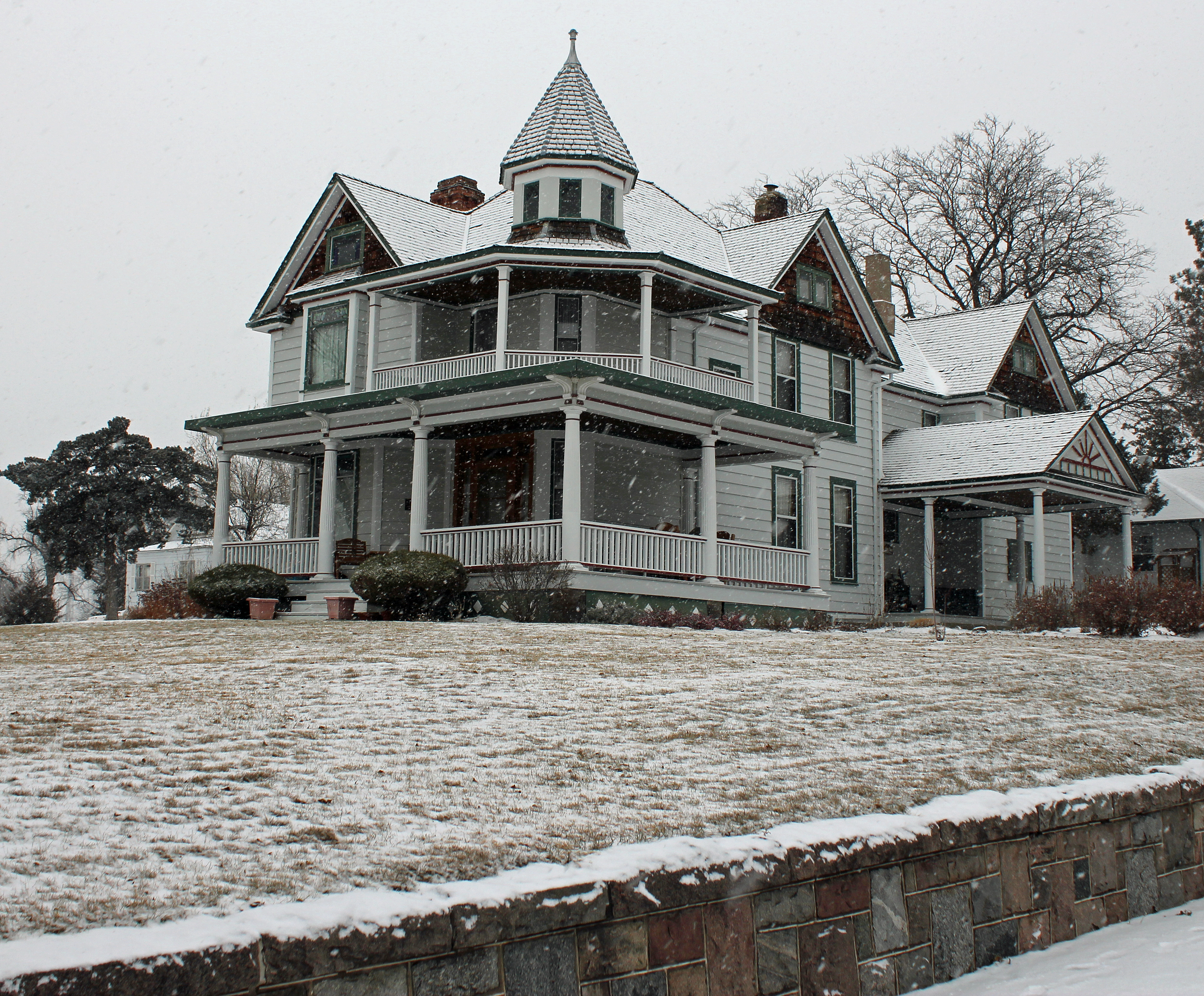

- Location within South Dakota Location within the United States
- Location: 129 S. Washington St., Pierre, South Dakota
- Coordinates: 44°21′49″N 100°20′9″W
- Area: less than one acre
- Built: 1885
- Architectural style: Queen Anne
- NRHP reference No.: 77001245
- Added to NRHP: September 22, 1977

The Crawford–Pettyjohn House is a historic house located at 129 S. Washington St. in Pierre, South Dakota. The Queen Anne style house was built in 1885. The house's design features a porch that wraps around the south and east sides, a hipped roof with cross gables, and a corner turret. Coe I. Crawford, who later became governor of South Dakota, was the house's first owner; Crawford lived in the house until 1896. Governor Robert S. Vessey may have also lived in the house during his time in office. In 1919, Frank Pettyjohn, who owned multiple local grain elevators, bought the house.

The house was added to the National Register of Historic Places on September 22, 1977.
