= Elias Crawford House =

Historic house in Massachusetts, United States

- U.S. National Register of Historic Places
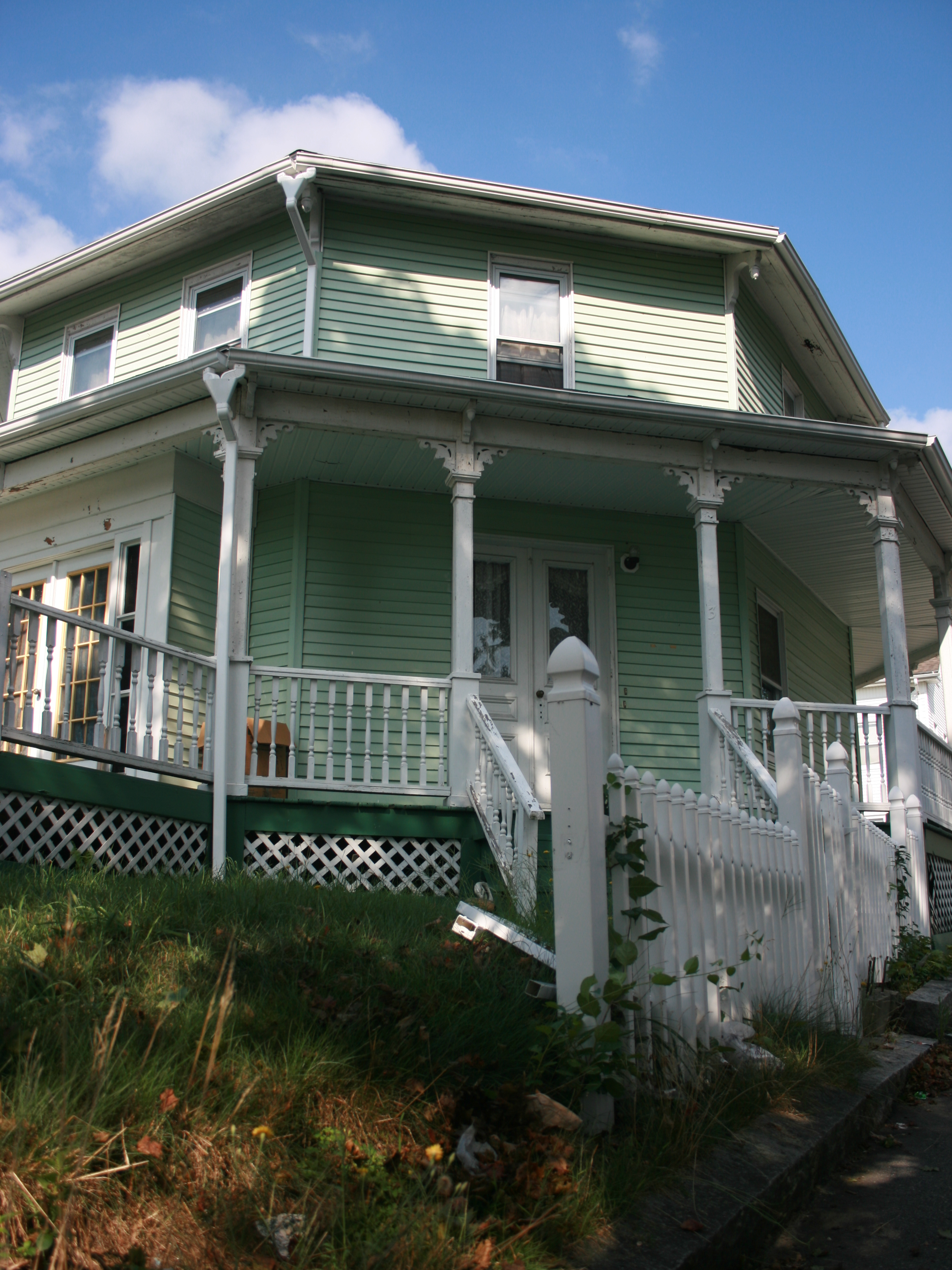

- Location within Massachusetts Location within the United States
- Location: 3 Norwood St., Worcester, Massachusetts
- Coordinates: 42°15′10″N 71°49′9″W
- Built: 1851
- Architectural style: Octagon Mode
- MPS: Worcester MRA
- NRHP reference No.: 80000552
- Added to NRHP: March 5, 1980

The Elias Crawford House is an historic octagon house located in Worcester, Massachusetts. It is one of two such houses in the city. The house was built sometime in the 1850s for an unknown owner; its first owner of record was Elias Crawford, a textile manufacturer, in 1870. It is a two-story frame house, with a wraparound porch, supported by chamfered posts, covering a portion of the first floor. A service wing was added to its rear (south and west sides) in the 19th century, and there is a stable on the property that appears to date to the time of the house.

The house was added to the National Register of Historic Places in 1980.

== See also ==
- National Register of Historic Places listings in southwestern Worcester, Massachusetts
- National Register of Historic Places listings in Worcester County, Massachusetts
