= Dabney Post Office =

- U.S. National Register of Historic Places
- Location within Kentucky Location within the United States
- Location: KY 39, Dabney, Kentucky
- Coordinates: 37°10′57″N 84°33′0″W
- Area: 0.1 acres (0.040 ha)
- Built: c. 1900
- Built by: Ped May
- MPS: Pulaski County MRA
- NRHP reference No.: 84001954
- Added to NRHP: August 14, 1984

The Dabney Post Office is a historic post office located on Kentucky Route 39 in Dabney, Kentucky. The one-story wood-frame building served as Dabney's community store and post office. Ped May built the post office around 1900; May ran both the store and the post office. The post office served as the social hub of Dabney, a common function of combination store and post office buildings in Pulaski County; the Dabney Post Office is one of the few surviving buildings of this type. The post office closed in the 1960s.

The post office was added to the National Register of Historic Places on August 14, 1984.

== See also ==
- List of United States post offices
