= Crawford-Gardner House =

Historic house in West Virginia, United States

- U.S. National Register of Historic Places
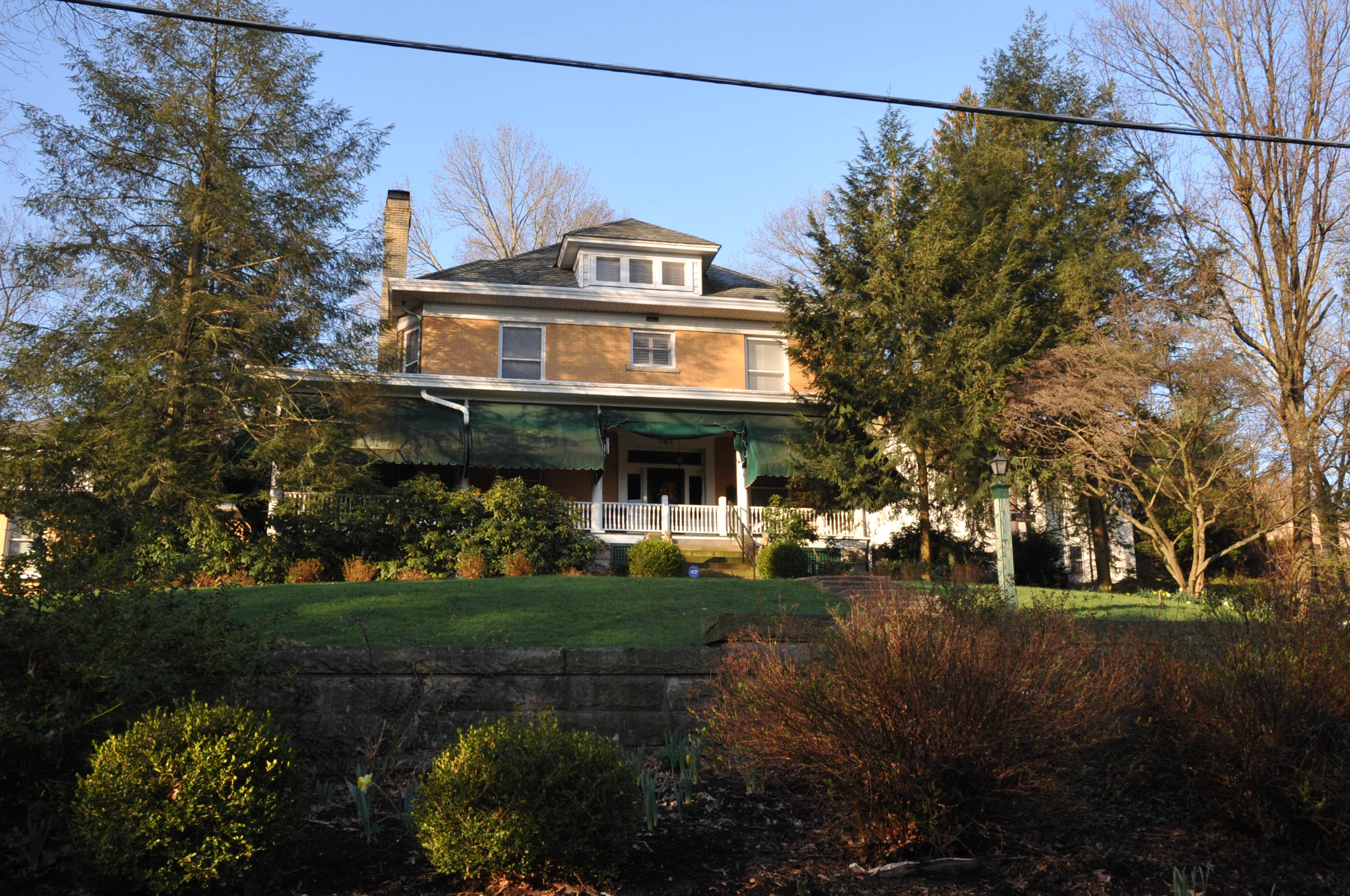

- Location within West Virginia Location within the United States
- Location: 743 Myrtle Rd., Charleston, West Virginia
- Coordinates: 38°20′43″N 81°38′34″W
- Area: 1 acre (0.40 ha)
- Built: 1904
- Architect: Calderwood, Andrew
- Architectural style: American Four Square
- MPS: South Hills MRA
- NRHP reference No.: 84000401
- Added to NRHP: October 26, 1984

Crawford-Gardner House is a historic home located at Charleston, West Virginia. Ellis Thayer Crawford was the senior member of Crawford and Ashby, a real estate firm dealing in coal and timber lands. He and his wife built this home around 1904. It is an American Foursquare-style house that features an intricately patterned wood floor.

It was listed on the National Register of Historic Places in 1984 as part of the South Hills Multiple Resource Area.
