= Ringgold, Kentucky =

Unincorporated community in Kentucky, United States

Coordinates: 37°06′29″N 84°39′13″W

Ringgold is an unincorporated community in Pulaski County, in the U.S. state of Kentucky.

== History ==
A post office called Ringgold was established in 1914, and remained in operation until 1934. The community was named in honor of Samuel Ringgold, hero of Battle of Palo Alto in the U.S.-Mexican War.
