= Burnside Masonic Lodge =

- Burnside Lodge
- U.S. National Register of Historic Places
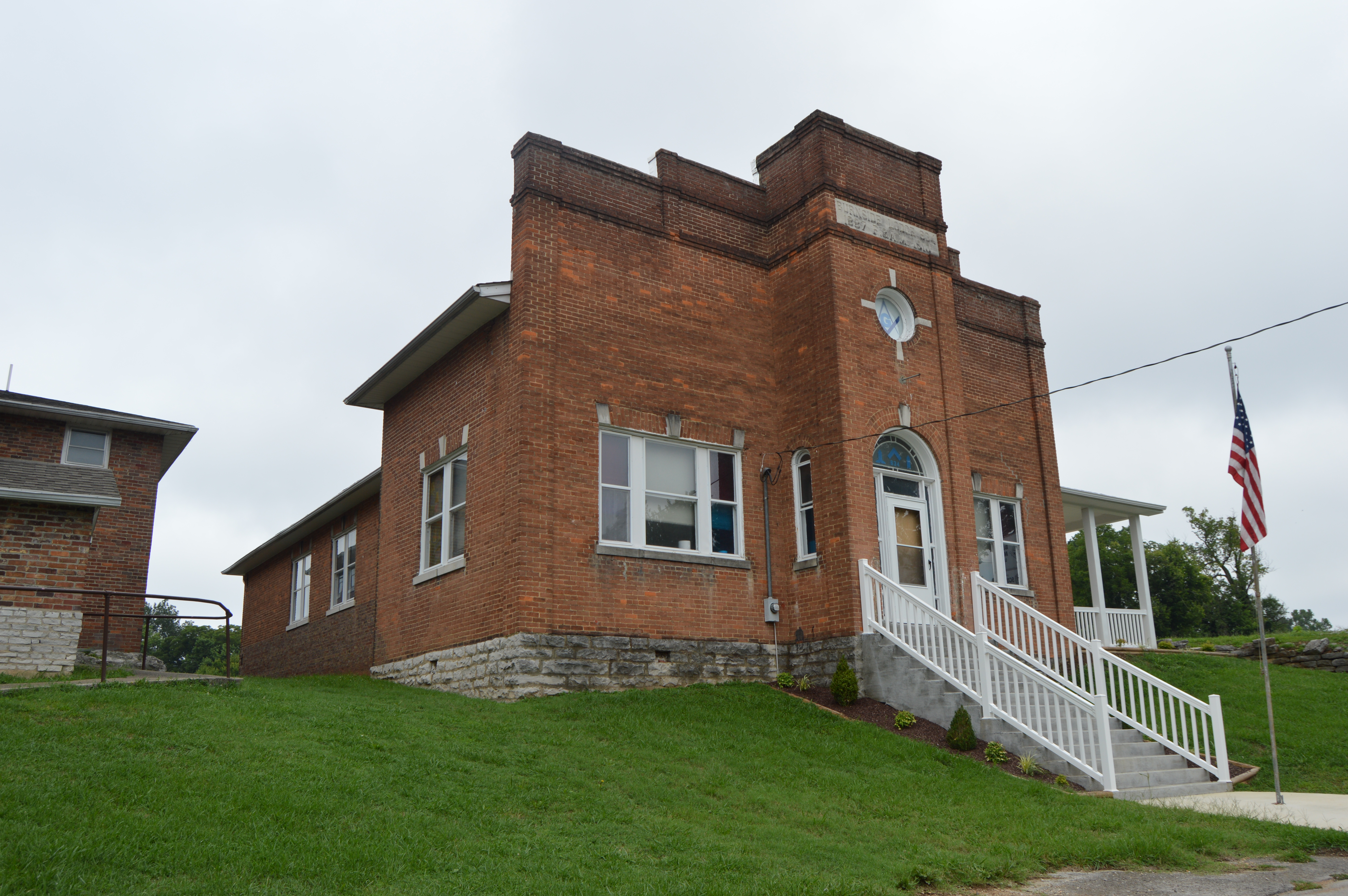

- Location within Kentucky
- Location: Off US 27, Burnside, Kentucky
- Coordinates: 36°59′13″N 84°36′03″W
- Area: 0.3 acres (0.12 ha)
- Built: 1910
- MPS: Pulaski County MRA
- NRHP reference No.: 84001946
- Added to NRHP: August 14, 1984

The Burnside Masonic Lodge, in Burnside, Kentucky, was built in 1910. It was listed on the National Register of Historic Places in 1984 as Burnside Lodge.

A Masonic lodge chapter was formed in Burnside in 1887 and had this building built in 1910. It is a one-story brick building, with brick laid in seven-course common bond.

It is located off U.S. Route 27.
