= Crawford House (Somerset, Kentucky) =

- U.S. National Register of Historic Places
- Location within Kentucky
- Location: 121 Maple St., Somerset, Kentucky
- Coordinates: 37°05′40″N 84°36′15″W
- Area: 0.4 acres (0.16 ha)
- Built: c.1890
- Architectural style: Late Victorian, Queen Anne
- MPS: Pulaski County MRA
- NRHP reference No.: 84001952
- Added to NRHP: August 14, 1984

The Crawford House in Somerset, Kentucky, at 121 Maple St., was built around 1890. It was listed on the National Register of Historic Places in 1984.

== Architecture ==
It was described as "an eclectic example of Victorian architecture which contains elements of the Queen Anne style. The main facade has the gable end facing the street and three intersecting bays extend to the south in a stepped pattern. An interesting feature of the main facade is the one-story porch which displays brick piers and hollow core concrete blocks. Beneath the eave of the porch are frame spindles and horizontal pendants. Windows on the structure are both two-over-two and one-over-one sash with stone ashlar lintels and rusticated stone sills. The roof has pressed metal shingles and beneath the eaves are brackets. The house has a two-story attached porte-cochiere with an open drive thru resting on brick piers. In the second story windows are twelve-over-one and diamond shaped windows. All original fixtures and woodwork of the house are intact on the interior."

It was deemed significant as "an interesting example of the Queen Anne style" with note of its "varied asymmetrical appearance", its original porte-cochiere, and its "unusual frame porch on the main facade." Including its additions, it was one of the largest Victorian homes in Pulaski County.

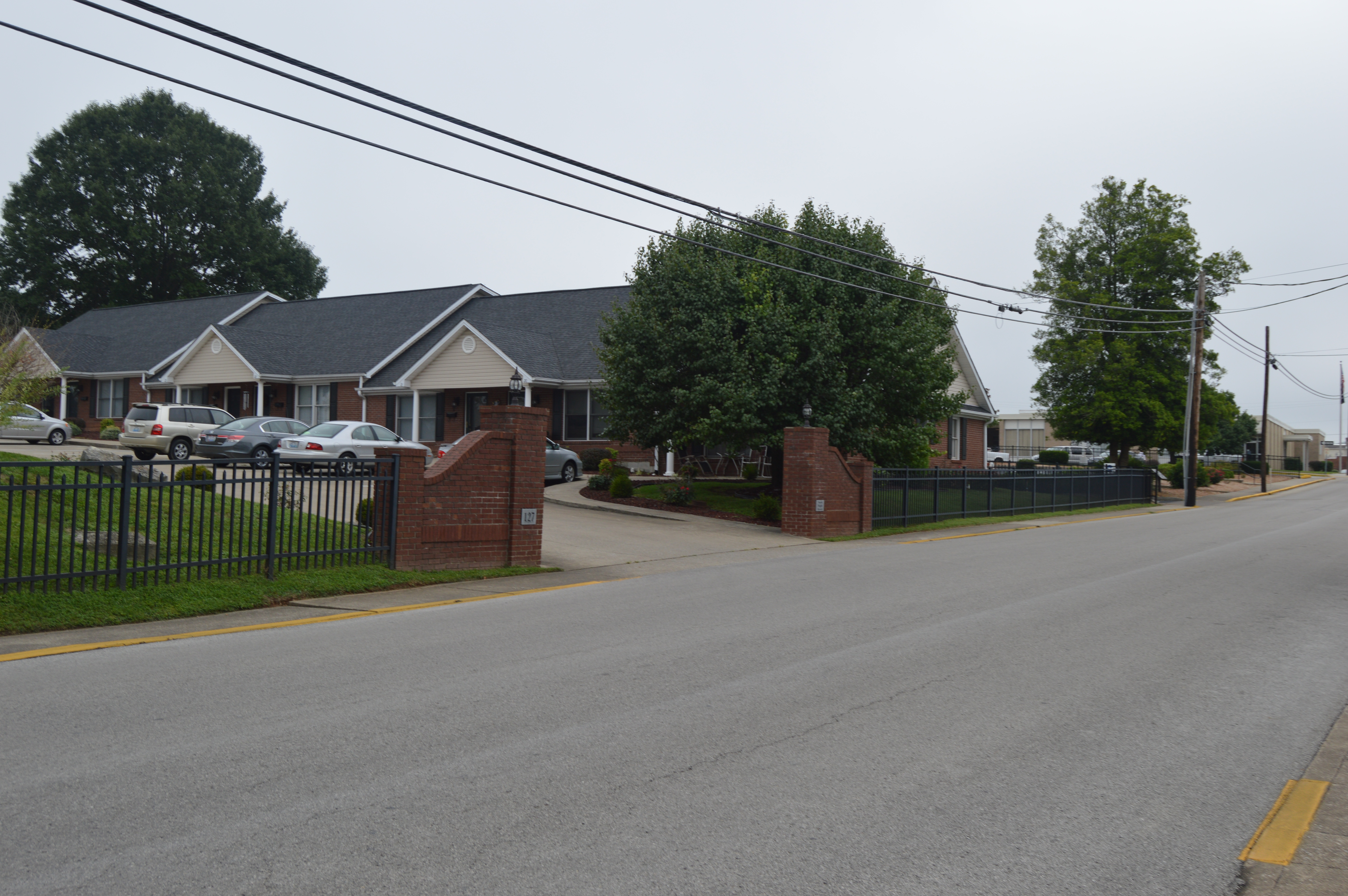
Site of house, photographed in 2014

The house has apparently been moved or destroyed.
