= Norfleet, Kentucky =

Unincorporated community in Kentucky, United States

Coordinates: 37°02′10″N 84°47′47″W

Norfleet is an unincorporated community in Pulaski County, in the U.S. state of Kentucky.

== History ==
A post office called Norfleet was established in 1906, and remained in operation until 1962. The community has the name of Wyatt Norfleet, a local merchant.
