= Issie Ringgold =

American blues singer

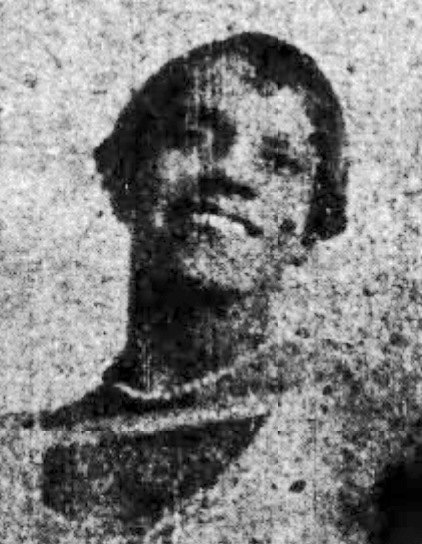
- Ringgold, from a 1926 newspaper
- Born: Isola Ringgold; March 1887; Philadelphia, Pennsylvania, U.S.
- Died: May 15, 1952 (aged 65); New York, New York, U.S.
- Other name: Izzy Ringgold
- Occupations: Blues singer, vaudeville performer
- Years active: 1910s to 1940s

Isola "Issie" Ringgold (March 1887 – May 15, 1952) was an American blues singer, known for suggestive songs she performed mostly on burlesque and vaudeville programs in the 1920s and 1930s.

== Early life ==
Ringgold was born in Philadelphia, the daughter of William A. Ringgold and Ella Chase Ringgold. Her father worked for the Atlantic City Highway Department. Her sisters Charlotte Ringgold and Muriel Ringgold were also entertainers.

== Career ==
Ringgold was dancing and singing in Chicago by 1911, and on the New York stage by 1913. She appeared in a 1917 act with Jesse A. Shipp, called "Down Home Ten". She was in a musical comedy in 1925, Moochin' Along, written by Jesse A. Shipp, Cecil Mack, and James Johnson.

In 1926, she joined the cast of "Rarin' to Go", and the act "Izzy Ringgold and the Dancing Maids" was part of the Connie's Inn Revue. It was labeled "the most indecent show ever shown in Harlem", and police tried to monitor the show. She headed "Flashes of 1928" in Washington, D.C. in 1928. She starred in another revue, "Sunflower South", in 1929, singing "That's My Weakness", "My Mother's Eyes", and "He's Funny That Way", and toured with her sisters Charlotte and Muriel, and a large cast of other vaudeville performers.

Ringgold toured on burlesque programs in the 1930s, billed as "the Female Furore". She sang suggestive songs, with titles including "My Handy Man" and "He's a Good Meat Cutter". In 1930 she was in The Joy Boat, a touring revue with Moms Mabley, Jimmie Baskett, Dusty Fletcher, Johnny Hudgins, and others. In 1939 she headlined "Lucky Sambo's Harlem Revue", a touring production with 70 performers. She continued performing into the 1940s.

== Recordings ==
Ringgold made two recordings for the Columbia Records label in 1930, "He's a Good Meat Cutter" and "Be On Your Merry Way". Those recordings have been anthologized several times, including on Blue Ladies Vol. 2 (1968), Big Mamas (1982), The Blues 1923 to 1933 (1987, BBC Records), Jazz Classic Masterpieces III (1989), Female Blues Singers (1991), Blue Girls (1996), and Heartbreakers (2000).
