= Dabney, Kentucky =

Unincorporated community in Kentucky, United States

- Unincorporated community
- Location within Kentucky
- Coordinates: 37°11′02″N 84°33′00″W
- Country: United States
- State: Kentucky
- County: Pulaski
- Elevation: 1,070 ft (330 m)
- Time zone: UTC-5 (Eastern (EST))
  - Summer (DST): UTC-4 (EDT)
- Area code: 606
- GNIS feature ID: 507805

Dabney is an unincorporated community in Pulaski County, Kentucky, United States. Dabney is located on Kentucky Route 39 7 miles (11 km) north-northeast of Somerset.

The Dabney Post Office, which closed in the 1960s, is listed on the National Register of Historic Places.
