= Crawford-Dorsey House and Cemetery =

Historic site in Clayton County, Georgia, US

- U.S. National Register of Historic Places
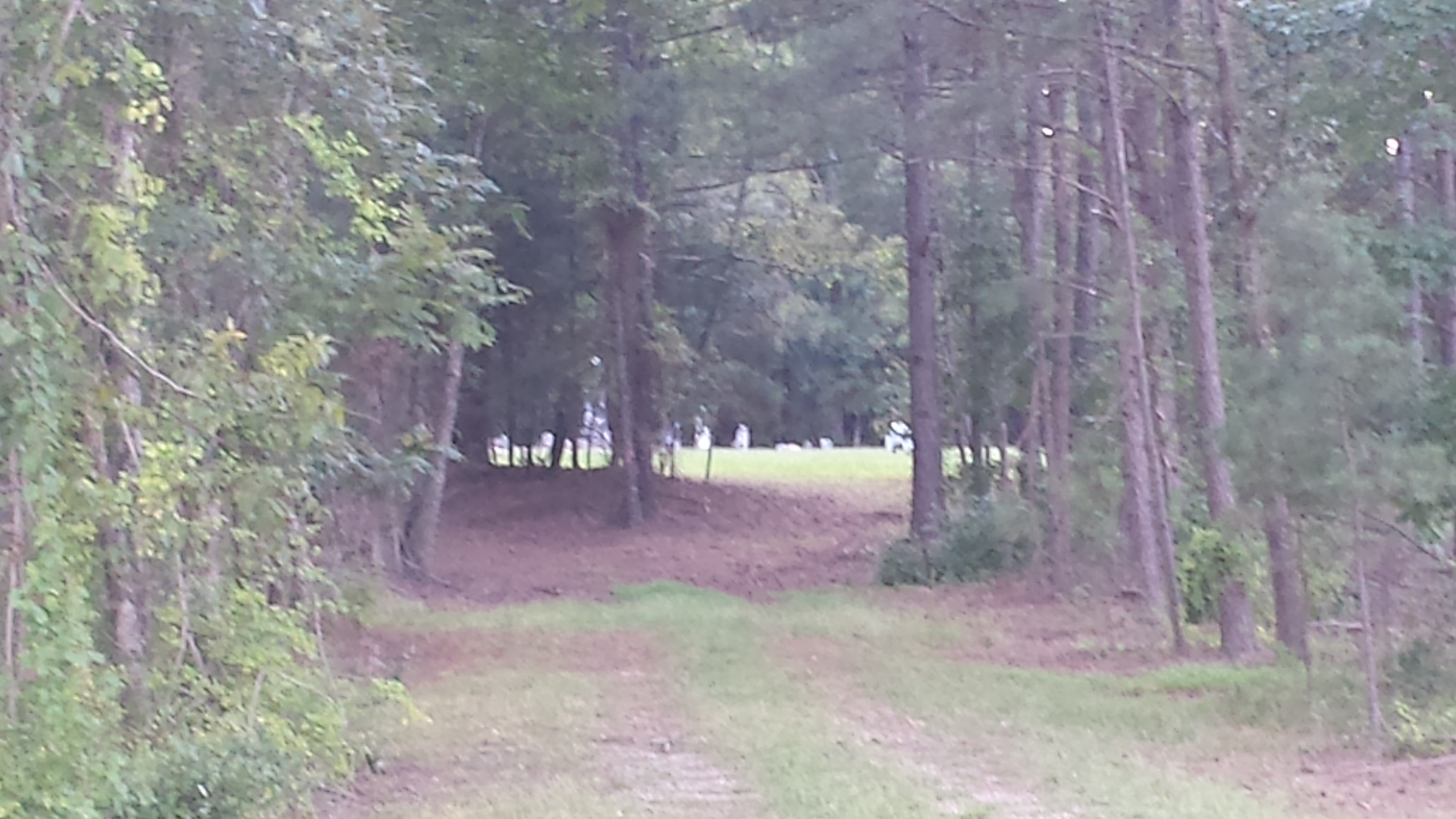
- The Crawford-Dorsey Cemetery

- Location within Metro Atlanta Location within Georgia Location within the United States
- Nearest city: Lovejoy, Georgia
- Coordinates: 33°27′11″N 84°18′45″W
- Area: 14.2 acres (5.7 ha)
- Built: 1820
- NRHP reference No.: 84000972
- Added to NRHP: July 05, 1984

The Crawford-Dorsey House in Lovejoy, Georgia was first begun by William Crawford in circa 1820. The area was then Henry County. Then in the mid-1850s Mr. Stephen Dorsey bought the home. He then moved his home on log rollers to the site of the Crawford home and connected the two homes together to form one residence. In 1858, this part of Henry County became Clayton County. Mr. Dorsey also became a Judge for the county. He was married to Lucinda McConnell.

By the time of the Civil War in 1861, he had amassed 2,400 acres of land in Clayton County and 500 acres in Henry County. He also possessed 41 slaves which made him one of the largest land and slave owners of Clayton County. The Civil War came to his home on July 28, 1864, during the McCook-Stoneman Raid. Judge Dorsey was hidden for fear of capture by the Union soldiers. Then the next incursion to his property was on August 20, 1864, during the Kilpatrick Raid to Lovejoy Station. The fighting began at Lovejoy and spread across Judge Dorsey's land on into Henry County. Then the Union Soldiers returned when General Hardee of the CSA lost at Jonesboro on August 31-September 1, 1864. Then General Hood CSA also abandoned Atlanta to move into Lovejoy where he stayed for approximately two weeks. Then the last time the Union forces came to Lovejoy and Mr. Dorsey's land was when General Kilpatrick came through on the March to the Sea and drove General Iverson CSA to Griffin.

After the Civil War, in 1867 a group of women from Griffin brought a train of flat cars to Lovejoy and recovered approximately 700 skeletons to take to Griffin to start the Confederate Cemetery. Lovejoy and the Dorsey property would not change much. Mr. Dorsey filed for reparations from damages done during the war, but by 1881 he had gotten nowhere. By the time the 20th century would come around the Hastings Seed Company would come to the area to grow flowers, shrubs, and trees to be shipped everywhere. Even the Dorsey family had gotten in on the Nursery business and they still to this day have a tree farm in Henry County.

The old Crawford-Dorsey House and family cemetery were placed on the National Register of Historic Places on July 5, 1984. The Clayton County Historical Society was thinking of restoring the old home for an attraction when it mysteriously burned in December 1984. From 1979 to 1984 there was extensive archaeological and artifact recovery done and shipped to the Atlanta Historical Society. The property had become part of the Clayton County Water Authority to be used as a spray field. The cemetery remains as well as the earthworks from the Civil War out behind where the old house once stood.
