= Burnside, Kentucky =

- City
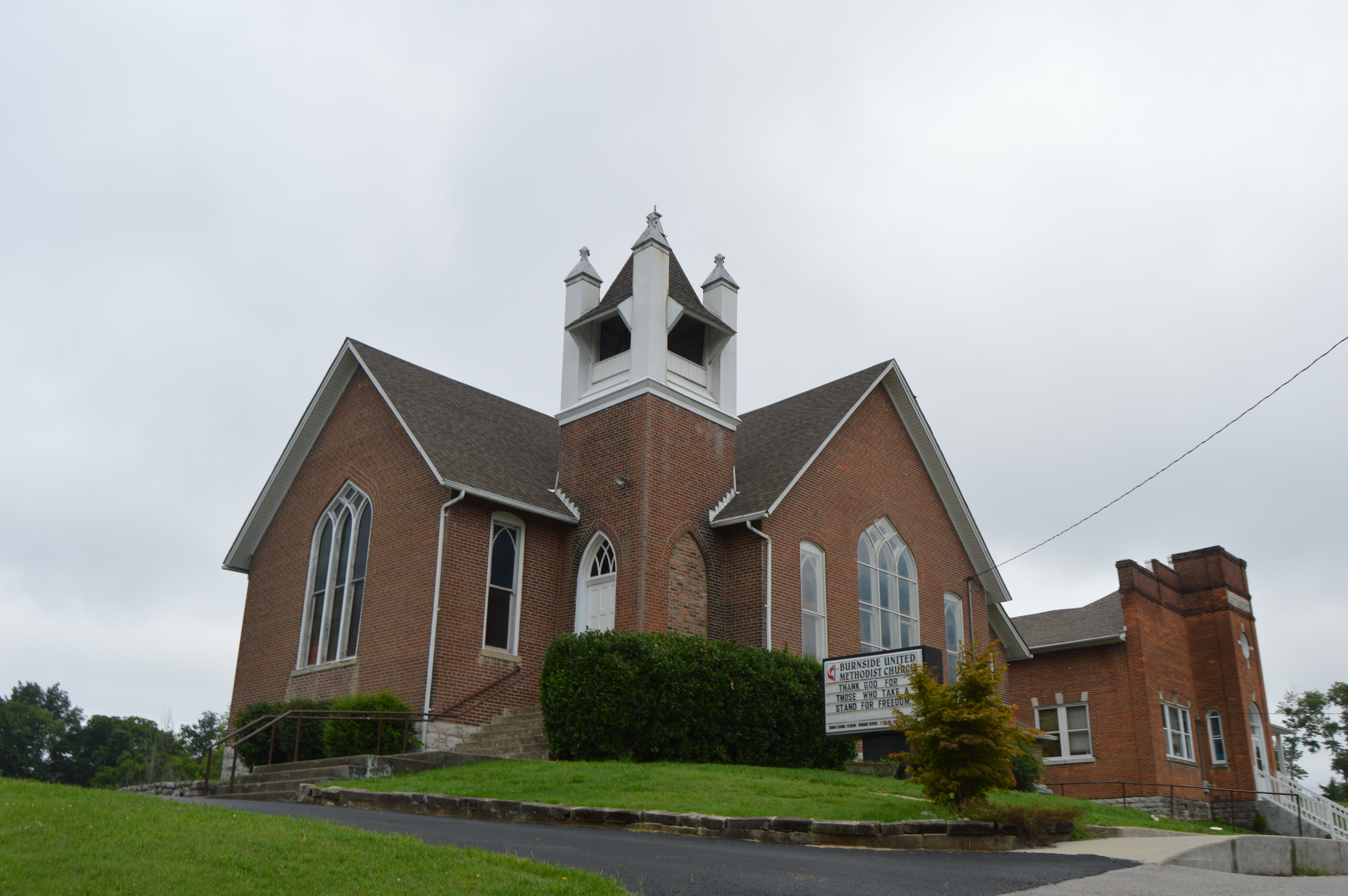
- Burnside Methodist Church

- Location of Burnside in Pulaski County, Kentucky.
- Coordinates: 36°59′12″N 84°36′12″W
- Country: United States
- State: Kentucky
- County: Pulaski

Area
  - Total: 9.00 sq mi (23.30 km^{2})
  - Land: 3.79 sq mi (9.82 km^{2})
  - Water: 5.20 sq mi (13.48 km^{2})
- Elevation: 722 ft (220 m)

Population (2020)
  - Total: 694
  - Density: 183.1/sq mi (70.69/km^{2})
- Time zone: UTC-5 (Eastern (EST))
  - Summer (DST): UTC-4 (EDT)
- ZIP code: 42519
- Area code: 606
- FIPS code: 21-11278
- GNIS feature ID: 2403957
- Website: www.cityofburnsideky.com

Burnside is a home rule-class city in Pulaski County, Kentucky, United States. As of the 2020 census, Burnside had a population of 694. In 2004, Burnside became the only town in Pulaski County or any adjoining county to allow the sale of alcoholic beverages in qualified establishments. Since then, Burnside has annexed about eight miles of shoreline along Lake Cumberland in order to include Lee's Ford Marina on Fishing Creek, allowing it to sell alcohol.

On August 28, 2007, Burnside voters again approved the sale of alcoholic beverages in restaurants that seat at least 100 people and derive at least 70% of their gross receipts from the sale of food, by a vote of 227–104. The petition for the election was started by two Pulaski County clergymen in an attempt to reverse Burnside's "moist" status.

On October 15, 2013, the City of Burnside voted to go fully "wet" by a count of 123–39.

== History ==
The community was originally settled at the juncture of the Cumberland River and its South Fork. It was called Point Isabel, allegedly for a woman who jumped off a nearby cliff after breaking off a relationship. In 1890, the town was renamed for Civil War General Ambrose Burnside, who established a camp there during the war.

Burnside was a center for shipping by rail and steamboat packet. Its lumber mills sent products around the world. The town boasted retail stores, saloons, a post office, restaurants, churches, a bank, hotels, and even Burnside Academy – the first Wesleyan preparatory school in the state.

In the early 1950s, the entire town was relocated to higher ground due to the impounding of Lake Cumberland. The town had once been a thriving community. American author Harriette Simpson Arnow who was known for her book The Dollmaker lived in Burnside as a child.

Burnside is one of several places that lay claim to be home to the first Boy Scout troop in the United States. In 1908, two years before the Boy Scouts of America was officially organized, Mrs. Myra Greeno Bass organized a local troop of 15 boys, using official Boy Scout materials she had acquired from England. A sign at the edge of town declares Burnside "Birthplace of Boy Scouts in America", and an official state historical society marker commemorates the troop.

== Geography ==
According to the United States Census Bureau, the city has a total area of 2.1 square miles (5.4 km^{2}), of which, 1.7 square miles (4.4 km^{2}) of it is land and 0.4 square miles (1.0 km^{2}) of it (18.75%) is water.

=== Climate ===
The climate in this area is characterized by hot, humid summers and generally mild to cool winters. According to the Köppen Climate Classification system, Burnside has a humid subtropical climate, abbreviated "Cfa" on climate maps.

== Demographics ==
Historical population
Census	Pop.	Note	%±
1910	1,117		—
1920	1,078		−3.5%
1930	914		−15.2%
1940	880		−3.7%
1950	615		−30.1%
1960	575		−6.5%
1970	586		1.9%
1980	775		32.3%
1990	695		−10.3%
2000	637		−8.3%
2010	611		−4.1%
2020	694		13.6%
U.S. Decennial Census

As of the census of 2000, there were 637 people, 287 households, and 200 families residing in the city. The population density was 378.3 inhabitants per square mile (146.1/km^{2}). There were 348 housing units at an average density of 206.7 per square mile (79.8/km^{2}). The racial makeup of the city was 99.37% White, 0.16% Native American, and 0.47% from two or more races. Hispanic or Latino of any race were 0.31% of the population.

There were 287 households, out of which 23.3% had children under the age of 18 living with them, 59.2% were married couples living together, 8.4% had a female householder with no husband present, and 30.0% were non-families. 25.4% of all households were made up of individuals, and 10.5% had someone living alone who was 65 years of age or older. The average household size was 2.22 and the average family size was 2.64.

In the city the population was spread out, with 17.3% under the age of 18, 6.0% from 18 to 24, 22.8% from 25 to 44, 37.0% from 45 to 64, and 17.0% who were 65 years of age or older. The median age was 47 years. For every 100 females, there were 94.2 males. For every 100 females age 18 and over, there were 91.6 males.

The median income for a household in the city was $30,781, and the median income for a family was $34,583. Males had a median income of $25,556 versus $19,375 for females. The per capita income for the city was $20,339. About 11.7% of families and 13.8% of the population were below the poverty line, including 18.4% of those under age 18 and 11.5% of those age 65 or over.

== Arts and culture ==
Burnside has a lending library, a branch of the Pulaski County Public Library.

== Education ==
Burnside Elementary School, also sometimes initialized as BES, is a public elementary school in the community. It is under the administration of Pulaski County Schools. The school provides education to grades 1–5. After attending BES, students attend Southern Middle School, then attend Southwestern High School.

== Notable people ==
- David E. Davis, Jr., automotive writer
