= Shopville, Kentucky =

Unincorporated community in Kentucky, United States

Shopville
- Unincorporated community
- Location within the state of Kentucky Shopville (the United States)
- Coordinates: 37°9′31″N 84°28′48″W
- Country: United States
- State: Kentucky
- County: Pulaski
- Elevation: 876 ft (267 m)
- Time zone: UTC-5 (Central (EST))
  - Summer (DST): UTC-4 (EST)
- GNIS feature ID: 515373

Shopville is an unincorporated community in Pulaski County, Kentucky, United States.

Shopville briefly gained national attention following the April 13, 2002 assassination of Pulaski County Sheriff Sam Catron at a political rally held by the town's fire department.

Shopville has a lending library, a branch of the Pulaski County Public Library.

== Education ==
Shopville Elementary School, also sometimes initialized as SHES, is a public elementary school in the community. It is under the administration of Pulaski County Schools. The school provides education to grades 1–5. After attending SHES, students attend Northern Middle School, then attend Pulaski County High School.
