= Pulaski County, Kentucky =

County in Kentucky, United States

- County
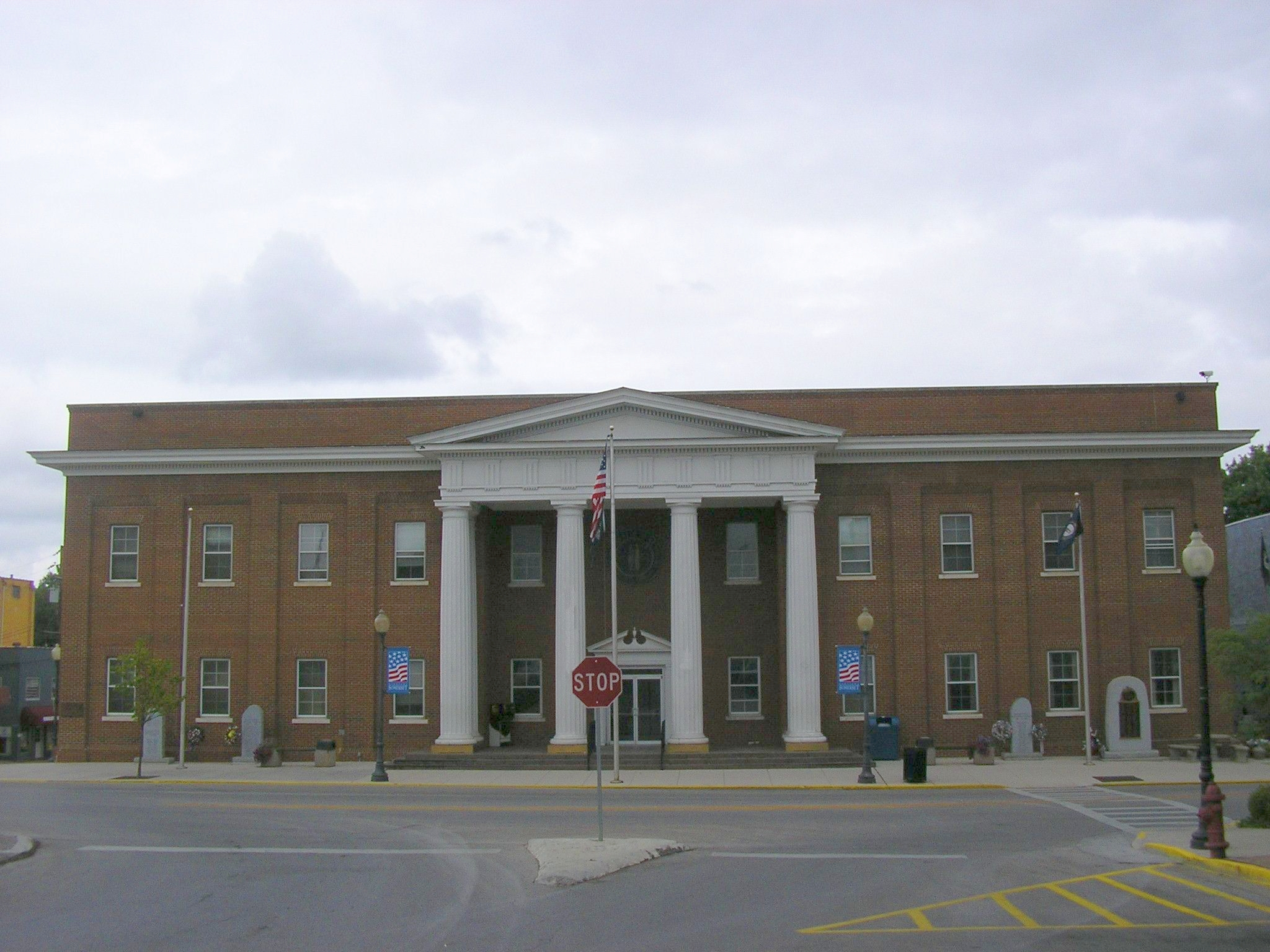
- Pulaski County Courthouse

- Location within the U.S. state of Kentucky
- Coordinates: 37°06′N 84°35′W
- Country: United States
- State: Kentucky
- Founded: 1798
- Named for: Casimir Pulaski
- Seat: Somerset
- Largest city: Somerset

Government
  - Judge/Executive: Marshall Todd (R)

Area
  - Total: 677 sq mi (1,750 km^{2})
  - Land: 658 sq mi (1,700 km^{2})
  - Water: 19 sq mi (49 km^{2}) 2.8%

Population (2020)
  - Total: 65,034
  - Estimate (2025): 67,384 ▲
  - Density: 98.8/sq mi (38.2/km^{2})
- Time zone: UTC−5 (Eastern)
  - Summer (DST): UTC−4 (EDT)
- Congressional district: 5th
- Website: pulaskigov.com

Pulaski County is a county in the U.S. Commonwealth of Kentucky. As of the 2020 census, the population was 65,034. Its county seat is Somerset. The county was founded in December 1798 from land given by Lincoln and Green Counties and named for Polish patriot Count Casimir Pulaski. Pulaski County comprises the Somerset, KY Micropolitan Statistical Area. Somerset's population is just over 12,000, but the Micropolitan Area for Somerset/Pulaski County is over 65,000.

== Geography ==
According to the United States Census Bureau, the county has a total area of 677 square miles (1,750 km^{2}), of which 658 square miles (1,700 km^{2}) is land and 19 square miles (49 km^{2}) (2.8%) is water. It is the third-largest county by area in Kentucky.

=== Adjacent counties ===
- Lincoln County (north)
- Rockcastle County (northeast)
- Laurel County (east)
- McCreary County (southeast)
- Wayne County (southwest)
- Russell County (west/CST Border)
- Casey County (northwest)

== Demographics ==
Historical population
Census	Pop.	Note	%±
1800	3,161		—
1810	6,897		118.2%
1820	7,597		10.1%
1830	9,500		25.0%
1840	9,620		1.3%
1850	14,195		47.6%
1860	17,201		21.2%
1870	17,670		2.7%
1880	21,318		20.6%
1890	25,731		20.7%
1900	31,293		21.6%
1910	35,986		15.0%
1920	34,010		−5.5%
1930	35,640		4.8%
1940	39,863		11.8%
1950	38,452		−3.5%
1960	34,403		−10.5%
1970	35,234		2.4%
1980	45,803		30.0%
1990	49,489		8.0%
2000	56,217		13.6%
2010	63,063		12.2%
2020	65,034		3.1%
2025 (est.)	67,384	▲	3.6%
U.S. Decennial Census; 1790–1960 1900–1990; 1990–2000 2010–2020

=== 2020 census ===
As of the 2020 census, the county had a population of 65,034. The median age was 42.9 years. 22.1% of residents were under the age of 18 and 20.2% of residents were 65 years of age or older. For every 100 females there were 95.7 males, and for every 100 females age 18 and over there were 92.5 males age 18 and over.

The racial makeup of the county was 92.4% White, 1.1% Black or African American, 0.3% American Indian and Alaska Native, 0.7% Asian, 0.0% Native Hawaiian and Pacific Islander, 1.2% from some other race, and 4.2% from two or more races. Hispanic or Latino residents of any race comprised 2.9% of the population.

47.4% of residents lived in urban areas, while 52.6% lived in rural areas.

There were 26,405 households in the county, of which 29.2% had children under the age of 18 living with them and 27.3% had a female householder with no spouse or partner present. About 28.3% of all households were made up of individuals and 13.5% had someone living alone who was 65 years of age or older.

There were 31,552 housing units, of which 16.3% were vacant. Among occupied housing units, 69.4% were owner-occupied and 30.6% were renter-occupied. The homeowner vacancy rate was 1.7% and the rental vacancy rate was 7.9%.

=== 2000 census ===
As of the census of 2000, there were 56,217 people, 22,719 households, and 16,334 families residing in the county. The population density was 85 per square mile (33/km^{2}). There were 27,181 housing units at an average density of 41 per square mile (16/km^{2}). The racial makeup of the county was 97.48% White, 1.07% Black or African American, 0.22% Native American, 0.37% Asian, 0.02% Pacific Islander, 0.17% from other races, and 0.67% from two or more races. 0.81% of the population were Hispanic or Latino of any race.

There were 22,719 households, out of which 31.20% had children under the age of 18 living with them, 58.50% were married couples living together, 10.10% had a female householder with no husband present, and 28.10% were non-families. 24.90% of all households were made up of individuals, and 10.80% had someone living alone who was 65 years of age or older. The average household size was 2.42 and the average family size was 2.87.

In the county, the population was spread out, with 23.40% under the age of 18, 8.00% from 18 to 24, 28.60% from 25 to 44, 24.90% from 45 to 64, and 15.10% who were 65 years of age or older. The median age was 38 years. For every 100 females there were 95.60 males. For every 100 females age 18 and over, there were 91.90 males.

The median income for a household in the county was $27,370, and the median income for a family was $32,350. Males had a median income of $27,398 versus $19,236 for females. The per capita income for the county was $15,352. About 14.80% of families and 19.10% of the population were below the poverty line, including 26.90% of those under age 18 and 16.60% of those age 65 or over.

== Politics ==
United States presidential election results for Pulaski County, Kentucky
Year	Republican		Democratic		Third party(ies)	
Year	No.	%	No.	%	No.	%
1912	1,731	31.01%	1,980	35.47%	1,871	33.52%
1916	4,136	61.35%	2,531	37.54%	75	1.11%
1920	7,262	65.67%	3,749	33.90%	48	0.43%
1924	6,435	62.66%	3,158	30.75%	676	6.58%
1928	9,348	78.84%	2,494	21.03%	15	0.13%
1932	6,905	58.22%	4,931	41.57%	25	0.21%
1936	7,570	61.51%	4,711	38.28%	25	0.20%
1940	8,533	63.36%	4,896	36.35%	39	0.29%
1944	8,318	67.47%	3,934	31.91%	76	0.62%
1948	7,549	64.93%	3,844	33.06%	234	2.01%
1952	9,651	70.41%	4,032	29.42%	24	0.18%
1956	10,636	72.99%	3,899	26.76%	37	0.25%
1960	11,899	79.35%	3,097	20.65%	0	0.00%
1964	7,383	55.60%	5,840	43.98%	55	0.41%
1968	8,290	64.26%	2,823	21.88%	1,788	13.86%
1972	10,602	76.99%	3,080	22.37%	88	0.64%
1976	9,226	61.17%	5,752	38.14%	105	0.70%
1980	12,970	65.11%	6,570	32.98%	379	1.90%
1984	14,434	76.40%	4,384	23.20%	75	0.40%
1988	13,482	73.50%	4,788	26.10%	72	0.39%
1992	11,423	58.84%	5,465	28.15%	2,526	13.01%
1996	11,945	63.44%	5,340	28.36%	1,544	8.20%
2000	15,845	73.56%	5,415	25.14%	281	1.30%
2004	19,535	76.56%	5,829	22.84%	152	0.60%
2008	19,862	77.09%	5,590	21.70%	314	1.22%
2012	20,714	79.66%	4,976	19.14%	313	1.20%
2016	22,902	81.67%	4,208	15.01%	931	3.32%
2020	25,442	80.62%	5,666	17.95%	449	1.42%
2024	26,051	82.09%	5,351	16.86%	333	1.05%

As is typical of the Unionist bloc of south-central Kentucky comprising the eastern Pennyroyal Plateau and the western part of the Eastern Coalfield, Pulaski County has been deep red Republican ever since the Civil War. The solitary Democrat to carry Pulaski County since that time has been Woodrow Wilson in 1912 — and Wilson did so only when the Republican Party was deadlocked between the conservative incumbent Taft and the progressive Theodore Roosevelt— Wilson took just 34.68 percent of the county's vote and won Pulaski only by 195 votes over Roosevelt and 249 over Taft.

With the exception of the cities of Burnside and Somerset, Pulaski County is a dry county.

=== Elected officials ===
Elected officials as of January 3, 2025
U.S. House	Hal Rogers (R)	KY 5
Ky. Senate	Rick Girdler (R)	15
Ky. House	Ken Upchurch (R)	52
Ky. House	Josh Bray (R)	71
Ky. House	David Meade (R)	80
Ky. House	Josh Branscum (R)	83
Ky. House	Shane Baker (R)	85

== Education ==
=== K-12 ===
Three public school districts serve the county:

- Pulaski County School District
  - The largest of the three districts, it serves the county outside the independent school districts of Somerset and Science Hill, with numerous elementary schools (Pulaski Elementary, Northern Elementary, Shopville Elementary, Eubank Elementary, Southern Elementary, Burnside Elementary, Nancy Elementary, Oak Hill Elementary) and middle schools (Northern Middle, Southern Middle) feeding into Pulaski County High School and Southwestern High School.
- Somerset Independent School District
  - Serves the city of Somerset with an elementary school (Hopkins Elementary), a middle school (Meece Middle) and a high school (Somerset High).
- Science Hill Independent School District
  - Serves the city of Science Hill, with a single K-8 school. Students graduating from Science Hill can choose to attend either Pulaski County, Southwestern or Somerset High School.

There are also several private schools in the county, including Somerset Christian School, Saline Christian Academy, & Jordan Christian Academy.

=== Colleges and universities ===
Campbellsville University-Somerset, Noe Education Center is a regional center for Campbellsville University located in Campbellsville, KY.

Somerset Community College is one of 16 two-year, open-admissions colleges of the Kentucky Community and Technical College System. The college offers academic, general education, and technical curricula leading to certificates, diplomas, and associate degrees. The college's Somerset Campus is located on Monticello Street in Somerset, across the street from the Center for Rural Development.

== Transportation ==
U.S. Highway South 27 runs through Pulaski County from north to south and Highway 80 runs East to West. Through the city limits of Somerset, Highway 27 stems into a three-lane road with a u-turn and left turn options at each stoplight. Many food chains, local businesses and commerce centers are strewn along the highway, due to accessibility and consistent traffic throughout the area. Outside the Somerset city limits, the highway becomes a four-lane road until it becomes a two-lane highway through downtown Burnside just south of Somerset.

Intersecting these highways are many junctions and bypasses that have been paved in order to allow quick and easy traffic flow through the county, revolving around the circumscribed Kentucky Route 914 around the outskirts of Somerset, in which transporters can enter through or exit from the city from any direction easily. These series of roads mimic the infrastructure of larger cities such as Interstate 465 in Indianapolis, Indiana and New Circle Road in Lexington, Kentucky. Many of these roads were paved in the 2000s. Despite the grand area of the county, the accessibility from one end to the other is smooth and expedited.

The eastern end of Louie B. Nunn Cumberland Expressway is towards the northern part of Somerset, on Highway 27. In the future, there are plans to expand the expressway to the 80/461 interchange near Shopville. Cumberland Expressway is also designated Future I-365.

Lake Cumberland Regional Airport is located in Pulaski County, on the southern end of Somerset's US 27 business district. The airport is owned by the city of Somerset and Pulaski County. It also serves the area around Lake Cumberland. It is mostly used for general aviation, and from late 2008 until February 2010, was served by one commercial airline, Locair. Currently, the $3 million federally funded passenger terminal is not in use.

The airport was renamed in 2008; it was formerly known as Somerset-Pulaski County Airport or J.T. Wilson Field.[3]

== Communities ==
=== Cities ===
- Burnside
- Eubank
- Ferguson
- Science Hill
- Somerset (county seat)

=== Unincorporated places ===
- Acorn
- Alcalde
- Antioch
- Bandy
- Barnesburg
- Bee Lick
- Blue John
- Bronston
- Burnetta
- Cains Store
- Clarence
- Coin
- Dabney
- Delmer
- Elihu
- Estesburg
- Etna
- Faubush
- Goochtown
- Hargis
- Haynes Knob
- Ingle
- Jacksonville
- Keno
- King Bee
- Mangum
- Meece
- Mount Victory
- Nancy
- Norfleet
- Norwood
- Oak Hill
- Omega
- Pointer
- Public
- Pulaski
- Ringgold
- Shafter
- Shopville
- Slate Branch
- Sloans Valley
- Squib
- Stab
- Tateville
- Valley Oak
- Welborn
- White Lilly
- Woodstock

== Notable residents ==
- Harriette Simpson Arnow (1908–1986), author of Eastern Kentucky novels and histories. She and her husband Harold Arnow farmed near Burnside in the late 1930s and early 1940s.
- Silas Adams, (1839–1896), born in Pulaski County, lawyer and member of the United States House of Representatives
- John Sherman Cooper, (1901–1991), born in Pulaski County. Lawyer, member Kentucky House of Representatives, Pulaski County Judge, United Nations delegate, member United States Senate, U.S. Ambassador to India and Nepal, first U.S. Ambassador to the German Democratic Republic (i.e. East Germany), member Warren Commission.
- Jack Daws, (1970–), born in Pulaski County. Conceptual artist.
- Daniel Dutton, (1959–), born in Pulaski County. Contemporary artist, musician, and story teller.
- Vermont Garrison, (1915–1994), career United States Air Force officer and "triple ace"
- Jack I. Gregory, (1931–) is a former general in the United States Air Force and the former commander in chief of the Pacific Air Forces.
- Reggie Hanson, (1968–), former NBA player for the Boston Celtics
- Free Frank McWorter, (1777–1854), enslaved resident of Pulaski country, managed a saltpeter mine so effectively that he bought freedom for himself and his family, and emigrated to Illinois.
- Rose Will Monroe, or Rosie the Riveter, (1920–1997) born in Pulaski County and moved to Michigan during World War II, where she helped build B-24s and B-29s for the war effort.
- Edwin P. Morrow, (1877–1935), Kentucky Governor, 1919–1923.
- Venus Ramey, (1924–2017), Miss America, 1944
- Lloyd B. Ramsey, (1918–2016), Major General United States Army, Commander 23rd Infantry Division (United States) (1969–1970), United States Army Provost Marshal General (1970–1974)
- Hal Rogers, (1937–), U.S. Congressman from Kentucky
- Brent Woods, (1855–1906), Sergeant, United States Army, Medal of Honor recipient.

== See also ==
- National Register of Historic Places listings in Pulaski County, Kentucky
